= 2023–24 Persepolis F.C. season =

Persepolis
2023–24 season
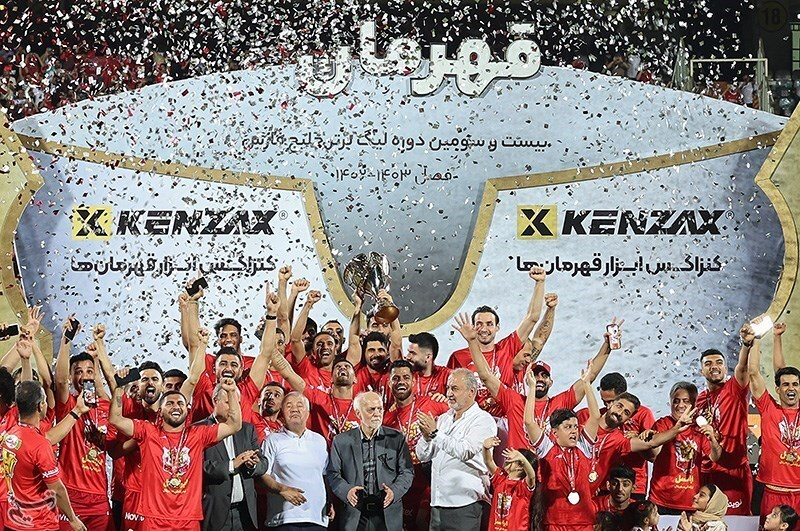
- President: Reza Darvish
- Head coach: Yahya Golmohammadi (until Jan. 1, 2024); Osmar Loss (from Jan. 27, 2024)
- Stadium: Azadi Stadium
- Persian Gulf Pro League: Winners
- Hazfi Cup: Round of 16
- Iranian Super Cup: Winners
- AFC Champions League: Group stage
- Top goalscorer: League: Issa Alekasir (7); All: Issa Alekasir (10)

The 2023–24 season is the Persepolis's 23nd season in the Persian Gulf Pro League, and their 41st consecutive season in the top division of Iranian Football. In addition to the domestic league, Persepolis will also participate in this season's Hazfi Cup competitions.

== Squad ==
No.	Name	Age	Nationality	Position (s)	Since	App	Goals	Assist	Ends	Signed from	Transfer fee	Notes
1	Alireza Beiranvand	31	(Iran)	GK	2022	153	0	0	2025	(Belgium) Royal Antwerp	Free	3rd Captain
22	Amir Reza Rafiei	21	(Iran)	GK	2022	0	0	0	2025	Nassaji	Free	U-23
44	Mehrshad Asadi	22	(Iran)	GK	2022	0	0	0	2027	Academy	Free	U-23
Defenders
3	Farshad Faraji	29	(Iran)	DF	2021	53	1	0	2023	Padideh	Free	
4	Ali Nemati	28	(Iran)	DF	2021	50	5	3	2024	Padideh	Free	
6	Hossein Kanaanizadegan	29	(Iran)	DF	2023	69	3	1	2025	(Qatar) Al Ahli	Free	
11	Danial Esmaeilifar	30	(Iran)	DF	2022	30	3	6	2024	Sepahan	Free	
30	Giorgi Gvelesiani	32	(Georgia (country))	DF	2022	29	6	0	2024	Sepahan	Free	
33	Abdelkarim Hassan	30	(Qatar)	DF	2024	0	0	0	2025	(Kuwait) Al-Jahra	Free	
37	Alireza Babaei	20	(Iran)	DF	2023	1	0	0	2026	Academy	Free	U-21
66	Vakhdat Khanonov	23	(Tajikistan)	DF	2021	19	1	1	2024	(Tajikistan) Istiklol	€150,000	
Midfielders
2	Omid Alishah	31	(Iran)	MF	2013	215	18	41	2025	Rah Ahan	Free	Captain
5	Masoud Rigi	32	(Iran)	MF	2023	0	0	0	2025	Sepahan	Free	
7	Soroush Rafiei	33	(Iran)	MF	2022	63	6	5	2024	Sepahan	Free	
9	Mehdi Torabi	29	(Iran)	MF	2018	127	30	38	2024	(Qatar) Al Arabi	Free	
17	Mohammad Mehdi Ahmadi	22	(Iran)	MF	2022	1	0	0	2025	Naft MIS	Free	U-23
19	Vahid Amiri	35	(Iran)	MF	2016	193	20	31	2024	(Turkey) Trabzonspor	Free	2nd Captain
21	Saeid Sadeghi	29	(Iran)	MF	2022	24	6	3	2025	Gol Gohar	Free	
27	Mohammad Khodabandelou	24	(Iran)	MF	2024	0	0	0	2025	Mes Rafsanjan	€160,000	
35	Alireza Enayatzadeh	19	(Iran)	MF	2023	0	0	0	2028	Academy	Free	U-21
48	Mohammad Milad Sourgi	21	(Iran)	MF	2023	0	0	0	2028	Academy	Free	U-23
70	Oston Urunov	23	(Uzbekistan)	MF	2024	0	0	0	2025	(Uzbekistan) Navbahor	Free	
88	Sina Asadbeigi	26	(Iran)	MF	2022	26	2	1	2025	Zob Ahan	Free	
Forwards
18	Abolfazl Babaei	20	(Iran)	FW	2023	0	0	0	2026	Fajr Sepasi	Free	U-21
29	Alireza Khodadadi	21	(Iran)	FW	2022	1	0	0	2027	Academy	Free	U-21
32	Omid Fahmi	21	(Iran)	FW	2023	0	0	0	2026	Academy	Free	U-21
72	Issa Alekasir	33	(Iran)	FW	2024	51	14	0	2025	Sepahan	Free	

Last updated: 24 January 2024.

== New Contracts ==
No	P	Nat.	Name	Age	Contract length	Contract ends	Source
2	MF	(Iran)	Omid Alishah	31	2 season	2025	
30	DF	(Georgia (country))	Giorgi Gvelesiani	32	1 season	2024	
1	GK	(Iran)	Alireza Beiranvand	31	2 season	2025	
21	MF	(Iran)	Saeid Sadeghi	29	2 season	2025	
10	MF	(Iran)	Milad Sarlak	28	1 season	2024	

== Transfers ==
=== In ===
Row	No	P	Nat.	Name	Age	Moving from	Ends	Transfer fee	Type	Transfer window	Quota	Source
1	17	DF	(Iran)	Mohammad Mehdi Ahmadi	22	Naft MIS	2025		Loan Return	Summer		
2	20	FW	(Iran)	Shahab Zahedi	27	(Ukraine) Zorya	2024		Loan	Summer		
3	5	MF	(Iran)	Masoud Rigi	32	Sepahan	2025		Transfer	Summer	PL	
4	6	DF	(Iran)	Hossein Kanaanizadegan	29	(Qatar) Al Ahli	2025		Transfer	Summer		
5	80	MF	(Iran)	Yasin Salmani	21	Sepahan	2025		Transfer	Summer	PL	
6	14	FW	(Sweden)	Nabil Bahoui	32	Qatar SC	2024		Transfer	Summer		
7	33	DF	(Qatar)	Abdelkarim Hassan	30	(Kuwait) Al-Jahra	2025		Transfer	Winter		
8	72	FW	(Iran)	Issa Alekasir	33	Sepahan	2025		Transfer	Winter		
9	70	MF	(Uzbekistan)	Oston Urunov	23	(Uzbekistan) Navbahor	2025		Transfer	Winter		
10	27	MF	(Iran)	Mohammad Khodabandelou	24	Mes Rafsanjan	2025	€160,000	Transfer	Winter		
Transfer From Youth
11	35	FW	(Iran)	Alireza Enayatzadeh	19	Academy	2028		Transfer	Summer	-	
12	34	MF	(Iran)	Mohammad Sourgi	21	Academy	2028		Transfer	Summer	-	
13	32	FW	(Iran)	Omid Fahimi	20	Academy	2028		Transfer	Summer	-	
14	40	FW	(Iran)	Mobin Ranjbari	20	Oghab Tehran	2026		Transfer	Winter	-	
15	28	MF	(Iran)	Nima Marouf Beigi	21	Oghab Tehran	2026		Transfer	Winter	-	
16	18	FW	(Iran)	Abolfazl Babaei	20	Fajr Sepasi	2026		Transfer	Winter	-	
17		DF	(Iran)	Samir Hoboobati	18	Academy	2026		Transfer	Winter	-	

=== Out ===
Row	No	P	Nat.	Name	Age	Moving to	Transfer fee	Type	Transfer window	Source
1	25	FW	(Mali)	Cheick Diabaté	35			Transfer	Summer	
2	88	MF	(Iran)	Siamak Nemati	28	Tractor		Transfer	Summer	
3	38	DF	(Iran)	Ali Joudaki	22	Pars Jonoubi		Transfer	Summer	
4	15	DF	(Iran)	Abolfazl Soleimani	22	Aluminium Arak		Loan	Summer	
5	11	MF	(Iran)	Kamal Kamyabinia	34	Zob Ahan		Transfer	Summer	
6	91	FW	(Brazil)	Leandro Pereira	31	(Japan) Tochigi		Transfer	Summer	
7	99	GK	(Iran)	Ahmad Gohari	27	Aluminium Arak		Loan	Summer	
8	72	FW	(Iran)	Issa Alekasir	33	Sepahan		Transfer	Summer	
9	16	FW	(Iran)	Mehdi Abdi	24	Tractor		Loan	Summer	
10	77	MF	(Iran)	Mohammad Omri	23	Malavan		Loan	Winter	
11	10	MF	(Iran)	Milad Sarlak	28	Malavan		Loan	Winter	
12	20	FW	(Iran)	Shahab Zahedi	28	(Ukraine) Zorya		Transfer	Winter	
13	14	FW	(Sweden)	Nabil Bahoui	32			Transfer	Winter	
due to injury
14	8	DF	(Iran)	Morteza Pouraliganji	31				Winter	
15	80	MF	(Iran)	Yasin Salmani	21				Winter	

== Technical staff ==
Position	Staff
Head coach	(Brazil) Osmar Loss
First-team coach	(Brazil) Rafael Toledo
Assistant coaches	(Iran) Jalal Hosseini
Goalkeeping coach	(Brazil) Jorcey Anísio
Fitness Coach	(Spain) Jose Augusto Losada Benítez
Assistant Fitness Coach	(Iran) Saman Eskandari
Analyzers	(Iran) Mehrdad Khanban (Iran) Mohammad Asgari
Doctor	(Iran) Dr. Alireza Haghighat
Physiotherapist	(Iran) Ali Aazam
Team Manager	(Iran) Afshin Peyrovani
Media Officer	(Iran) Alireza Ashraf

Position	Staff
Under-23 team coach	(Iran) Mahmoud Ansari
Youth team coach	(Iran) Mehdi Ataloo
Under-17 coach	(Iran) Farzad Ashoubi
Under-14 coach	(Iran) Hassan Khanmohammadi

== Pre-season and friendlies ==
=== Pre-season ===
Win Draw Loss Fixtures

11 July 2023 Friendly	Persepolis	7–0	Shams Azar	Tehran
	Abdi 5', 14', 26', 33'; Alishah 21' (pen.); Gvelesiani 50' (pen.); Omri 61'	Report		Stadium: Shahid Kazemi Stadium

16 July 2023 Friendly	Persepolis	1–0	Esteghlal Khuzestan	Tehran
	Kanaanizadegan 26'	Report		Stadium: Shahid Kazemi Stadium

17 July 2023 Friendly	Persepolis	2–0	Paykan	Tehran
	6' (o.g.); Khodadadi 62'	Report		Stadium: Shahid Dastgerdi Stadium

21 July 2023 Friendly	Persepolis	2–0	Sanat Naft	Tehran
	Faraji 53'; Kanaanizadegan 65'	Report		Stadium: Shahid Kazemi Stadium

29 July 2023 Friendly	Persepolis	3–1	Mes Rafsanjan	Tehran
	Sadeghi 35'; Amiri 45'; Khodadadi 85'	Report	Mohebi 20'	Stadium: Shahid Kazemi Stadium

3 August 2023 Friendly	Persepolis	2–2	Nassaji	Tehran
	Nemati 25'; Zahedi 70'	Report	Gholamalibeygi 35'; Azadi 75'	Stadium: Shahid Kazemi Stadium

4 August 2023 Friendly	Persepolis	1–3	Fajr Sepasi	Tehran
	Gvelesiani (pen.)	Report		Stadium: Shahid Kazemi Stadium

=== Friendlies ===
10 August 2023 Friendly	Persepolis	3–0	Chadormalou Ardakan	Tehran
	Alishah 31'; Omri 58'; Abdi 80'	Report		Stadium: Shahid Kazemi Stadium

18 August 2023 Friendly	Persepolis	0–0	Ario Bam Eslamshahr	Tehran
		Report		Stadium: Shahid Kazemi Stadium

7 September 2023 Friendly	Persepolis	3–1	Sepidrood Rasht	Tehran
		Report		Stadium: Shahid Kazemi Stadium

== Competitions ==
=== Overview ===
Competition	First match	Last match	Starting round	Final position	Record							
Competition	First match	Last match	Starting round	Final position	Pld	W	D	L	GF	GA	GD	Win %
PGPL	9 August 2023	1 June 2024	Matchday 1	Winners	30	20	8	2	45	18	+27	66.67
Hazfi Cup	4 March 2024	26 April 2024	Round of 32	Round of 8	2	1	1	0	7	4	+3	50.00
Super Cup	-		Final	Winners	0	0	0	0	0	0	+0	—
ACL	19 September 2023	11 December 2023	Group stage	Group stage	6	2	2	2	5	5	+0	33.33
Total					38	23	11	4	57	27	+30	60.53

Last updated: 1 June 2024
Source: Competitions

=== Persian Gulf Pro League ===
==== Results summary ====
Overall								Home						Away					
Pld	W	D	L	GF	GA	GD	Pts	W	D	L	GF	GA	GD	W	D	L	GF	GA	GD
30	20	8	2	45	18	+27	68	11	4	0	24	10	+14	9	4	2	21	8	+13

Last updated: 1 June 2024.
Source: Ipl Stats

==== Results by round ====
Round	1	2	3	4	5	6	7	8	9	10	11	12	13	14	15	16	17	18	19	20	21	22	23	24	25	26	27	28	29	30
Ground	H	A	H	A	H	A	H	A	H	A	H	H	A	H	A	A	H	A	H	A	H	A	H	A	H	A	A	H	A	H
Result	W	W	D	W	D	W	W	D	D	L	W	W	D	W	D	L	W	W	W	D	W	W	W	W	D	W	W	W	W	W
Position	5	3	3	2	3	3	2	3	3	4	3	3	3	3	3	3	2	2	2	2	2	2	2	2	2	2	2	1	1	1
Points	3	6	7	10	11	14	17	18	19	19	22	25	26	29	30	30	33	36	39	40	43	46	49	52	53	56	59	62	65	68

Updated to match(es) played on 1 June 2024. Source: "iranleague".
A = Away; H = Home; W = Win; D = Draw; L = Loss

==== League table ====
Pos	Team	Pld	W	D	L	GF	GA	GD	Pts	Qualification or relegation
1	Persepolis (C)	30	20	8	2	45	18	+27	68	Qualification for the 2024–25 AFC Champions League Elite phase
2	Esteghlal	30	19	10	1	40	15	+25	67	Qualification for the 2024–25 AFC Champions League Elite phase
3	Sepahan	30	17	6	7	53	26	+27	57	Qualification for the 2024–25 AFC Champions League Elite qualifying play-offs (Note: Qualified as the 2023–24 Hazfi Cup winners.)
4	Tractor	30	16	6	8	42	22	+20	54	Qualification for the 2024–25 AFC Champions League Two group stage
5	Zob Ahan	30	11	9	10	30	29	+1	42	

Source: Iran Football League Organization - League Full Table, Iplstats
Rules for classification: 1) Points; 2) Head-to-head points; 3) Head-to-head goal difference; 4) Total goal difference; 5) Total goals scored; 6) Play-off at neutral venue.
(Note: Head-to-head record is used only after all the matches between the teams in question have been played).
(C) Champions

==== Matches ====
Win Draw Loss Postponed

9 August 2023 1	Persepolis	1–0	Aluminium	Tehran
19:30 IRST (UTC+03:30)	Nemati 38'		Fakhreddini (yellow card) 8'; Naghizadeh (yellow card) 45+4'	Stadium: Azadi Stadium; Attendance: 0 Referee: Amir Saman Soltani; Man of the Match: Ali Nemati (Persepolis)

16 August 2023 2	Tractor	0–1	Persepolis	Tabriz
19:00 IRST (UTC+03:30)			Sadeghi 42'	Stadium: Yadegar-e Emam Stadium; Attendance: 50,000; Referee: Amir Arab Baraghi; Man of the Match: Morteza Pouraliganji (Persepolis)

24 August 2023 3	Persepolis	1–1	Zob Ahan	Tehran
17:00 IRST (UTC+03:30)	Esmaeilifar (yellow card) 10'; Pouraliganji (yellow card) 44'; Gvelesiani 84'		Eslami (yellow card) 5'; Rafiei 44' (o.g.); Far Abbasi (yellow card) 66'; Mokhtari (yellow card) 80'	Stadium: Azadi Stadium; Attendance: 0 Referee: Reza Adel; Man of the Match: Vahid Amiri (Persepolis)

30 August 2023 4	Foolad	0–2	Persepolis	Ahvaz
17:00 IRST (UTC+03:30)	Moridi (yellow card) 50'		Pouraliganji (yellow card) 50', (goal) 66'; Kanaanizadegan (yellow card) 88'; Salmani 90+4'	Stadium: Foolad Arena; Attendance: 25,000; Referee: Hassan Akrami; Man of the Match: Morteza Pouraliganji (Persepolis)

14 December 2023 5	Persepolis	1–1	Esteghlal	Tehran
16:15 IRST (UTC+03:30)	Sadeghi (yellow card) 54' Alishah 77' (yellow card) 78'		Hamedifar (yellow card) 50' Cheshmi (yellow card) 53' Yamga 90+7' (pen.) Hardani (yellow card) 90+8'	Stadium: Azadi Stadium; Attendance: 64,000; Referee: Mouood Bonyadifar; Man of the Match: Arthur Yamga (Esteghlal)

19 October 2023 6	Paykan	1–3	Persepolis	Qazvin
16:50 IRST (UTC+03:30)	Pakdel 46'		Zahedi 13', 72', 80' (pen.); Faraji (yellow card) 23'; Asadbeigi (yellow card) 90+3'	Stadium: Sardar Azadegan; Attendance: 15,000; Referee: Ahmad Mohammadi; Man of the Match: Shahab Zahedi (Persepolis)

8 October 2023 7	Persepolis	1–0	Gol Gohar	Tehran
17:00 IRST (UTC+03:30)	Rafiei (yellow card) 29'; Zahedi 41'; Beiranvand (yellow card) 67'; Esmaeilifar (yellow card) 90+2'		Forouzan (yellow card) 46'	Stadium: Azadi Stadium; Attendance: 30,000; Referee: Payam Heidari; Man of the Match: Danial Esmaeilifar (Persepolis)

29 October 2023 8	Malavan	0–0	Persepolis	Bandar-e Anzali
16:00 IRST (UTC+03:30)	Fadakar (yellow card) 28' Akvan (yellow card) 88' Ghazipour (yellow card) 90+5'			Stadium: Sirous Ghayeghran Stadium; Attendance: 5,000; Referee: Vahid Kazemi; Man of the Match: Pouria Pourali (Malavan)

2 November 2023 9	Persepolis	2–2	Sanat Naft	Tehran
18:00 IRST (UTC+03:30)	Omri 57' Alishah (yellow card) 73' Gvelesiani 75' (pen.)		Yousif 14' Alboghobeysh (yellow card) 22' Sangargir (yellow card) 25' (yellow-red card) 45+1' Panahi (yellow card) 70' Mirdouraghi (yellow card) 73' Esmaeilifar 90+5' (o.g.)	Stadium: Azadi Stadium; Attendance: 15,000; Referee: Ali Safaei; Man of the Match: Ali Yousif (Sanat Naft Abadan)

12 November 2023 10	Sepahan	1–0	Persepolis	Esfahan
16:30 IRST (UTC+03:30)	Asadi 70' (yellow card) 90+1' Ghorbani (yellow card) 85' Rezaeian (yellow card) 90+6'		Zahedi (yellow card) 67' (yellow-red card) 90+7' Sarlak (yellow card) 86'	Stadium: Naghsh-e Jahan; Attendance: 50,000; Referee: Mouood Bonyadifar; Man of the Match: Reza Asadi (Sepahan)

28 December 2023 11	Persepolis	1–0	Nassaji	Tehran
IRST (UTC+03:30)	Zahedi 31' Gvelesiani (yellow card) 60' Beiranvand (yellow card) 90+5'		Zamehran (yellow card) 87'	Stadium: Azadi Stadium; Attendance: 20,000; Referee: Seyed Reza Mahdavi; Man of the Match: Mehdi Torabi (Persepolis)

9 December 2023 12	Persepolis	1–0	Havadar	Tehran
15:30 IRST (UTC+03:30)	Mohebi 21' (.o.g) Nemati (yellow card) 68' Beiranvand (yellow card) 79' Rafiei (yellow card) 90+3'		Mohebi (yellow card) 41' Mansouri (yellow card) 85' Zavoshi (yellow card) 90+6'	Stadium: Azadi Stadium; Attendance: 7,000; Referee: Ashkan Khorshidi; Man of the Match: Danial Esmaeilifar (Persepolis)

19 December 2023 13	Esteghlal Khuzestan	2–2	Persepolis	Ahvaz
15:00 IRST (UTC+03:30)	Aghaeipour 6' 49' Saki (yellow card) 32' Ahmadi (yellow card) 70'		Kanaanizadegan 39' (pen.) (yellow card) 72' Bahoui 68'	Stadium: Ghadir Stadium; Attendance: 6,000; Referee: Amir Arab Baraghi; Man of the Match: Javad Aghaeipour (Esteghlal Khuzestan)

24 December 2023 14	Persepolis	2–1	Shams Azar	Tehran
17:30 IRST (UTC+03:30)	Giorgi Gvelesiani 45+2' 81' (pen.) Nemati (yellow card) 47' (yellow-red card) 62' Alishah (yellow card) 87'		Rezaei (yellow card) 39' Sarabadani (penalty missed) Goudarzi 47'	Stadium: Azadi Stadium; Attendance: 12,000; Referee: Kopal Nazemi; Man of the Match: Giorgi Gvelesiani (Persepolis)

1 January 2024 15	Mes Rafsanjan	1–1	Persepolis	Rafsanjan
17:30 IRST (UTC+03:30)	Bagheri (yellow card) 40' Entezari (yellow card) 41' Chimba 52' (pen.)		Ahmadi (yellow card) 20' Sadeghi (yellow card) 41' Zahedi 42' Alishah (yellow card) 67'	Stadium: Shohadaye Mes Rafsanjan Stadium; Attendance: 5*000; Referee: Vahid Kazemi; Man of the Match: Mohammad Mehdi Mohebi (Mes Rafsanjan)

15 February 2024 16	Aluminium	1–0	Persepolis	Arak
17:15 IRST (UTC+03:30)	Amir Noori 75'		Zahedi (yellow card) 46' Kanaanizadegan (yellow card) 90+5'	Stadium: Imam Khomeini Stadium; Attendance: 10,000; Referee: Bijan Heidari; Man of the Match: Amir Nouri (Aluminium)

21 February 2024 17	Persepolis	2–0	Tractor	Tehran
17:15 IRST (UTC+03:30)	Rafiei (yellow card) 25' Alekasir 57' Torabi 59' Beiranvand (yellow card) 90+5'		Khalilzadeh (yellow card) 32' Nemati (yellow card) 78'	Stadium: Azadi Stadium; Attendance: 0 Referee: Vahid Kazemi; Man of the Match: Mehdi Torabi (Persepolis)

28 February 2024 18	Zob Ahan	0–1	Persepolis	Esfahan
17:15 IRST (UTC+03:30)	Rezaei (yellow card) 44' Yousefi (yellow card) 45' Azarbad (red card) 53' Eslami (yellow card) 70' Kamyabinia (yellow card) 90+5' Mosleh (yellow card) 90+7'		Gvelesiani 9' (pen.) Nemati (yellow card) 50' Hassan (yellow card) 90+6'	Stadium: Foolad Shahr Stadium; Attendance: 3,000; Referee: Ali Safaei; Man of the Match: Mohsen Forouzan (Zob Ahan)

8 March 2024 19	Persepolis	4–2	Foolad	Tehran
17:30 IRST (UTC+03:30)	Urunov 35' Kanaanizadegan (yellow card) 44' (goal) 68' (pen.) Alekasir 54' Torabi 74'		Colibaly 11' Abdelkarim 42' (o.g.) Bou Hamdan (yellow card) 63' Najjarian (red card) 65'	Stadium: Azadi Stadium; Attendance: 25,000; Referee: Seyed Reza Mahdavi; Man of the Match: Mehdi Torabi (Persepolis)

13 March 2024 20	Esteghlal	0–0	Persepolis	Tehran
20:00 IRST (UTC+03:30)	Rezavand (yellow card) 40' Hamedifar (yellow card) 50'		Rafiei (yellow card) 45+5'	Stadium: Azadi Stadium; Attendance: 55,000; Referee: Vahid Kazemi; Man of the Match: Ali Nemati (Persepolis)

17 March 2024 21	Persepolis	2–0	Paykan	Tehran
18:45 IRST (UTC+03:30)	Kanaanizadegan (yellow card) 21' (goal) 38' (pen.), 53'			Stadium: Azadi Stadium; Referee: Kopal Nazemi

7 April 2024 22	Gol Gohar	0–1	Persepolis	Sirjan
19:00 IRST (UTC+03:30)	Fallah (yellow card) 85'		Urunov 28'	Stadium: Shahid Soleimani; Referee: Mouood Bonyadifar

12 April 2024 23	Persepolis	1–0	Malavan	Tehran
20:00 IRST (UTC+03:30)	Alekasir 49' Rafiei (yellow card) 90+4'			Stadium: Azadi Stadium; Referee: Payam Heidari

18 April 2024 24	Sanat Naft	0–3	Persepolis	Abadan
19:00 IRST (UTC+03:30)			Esmaeilifar 8' Gvelesiani (yellow card) 46' Alekasir 66' Kanaanizadegan 71' (pen.)	Stadium: Takhti Abadan; Referee: AliAsghar Momeni

1 May 2024 25	Persepolis	0–0	Sepahan	Tehran
19:30 IRST (UTC+03:30)	Alekasir (yellow card) 63'; Alishah (red card) 82'		Ahmadzadeh (yellow card) 58'	Stadium: Azadi Stadium; Attendance: 60,000; Referee: Bijan Heidari

6 May 2024 26	Nassaji	1–2	Persepolis	Qaem Shahr
18:15 IRST (UTC+03:30)	Samdaliri (yellow card) 18'; Zamehran (yellow card) 48'; Houshmand 59'; Hardani (yellow card) 68'; Mohammadzadeh (yellow card) 90+4'		Urunov 6', 69'; Rafiei (yellow card) 10' (yellow-red card) 50'; Kanaanizadegan (yellow card) 90+2'	Stadium: Vatani Stadium; Attendance: 15,000; Referee: Mouood Bonyadifar

11 May 2024 27	Havadar	0–2	Persepolis	Tehran
18:20 IRST (UTC+03:30)	Mansouri (yellow card) 45+1'		Alekasir 14', 74'; Alishah (yellow card) 78'	Stadium: Dastgerdi; Attendance: 0 Referee: Hassan Akrami

24 May 2024 28	Persepolis	4–3	Esteghlal Khuzestan	Tehran
IRST (UTC+03:30)	Beiranvand (yellow card) 45+5'; Nemati (yellow card) 52'; Alekasir (yellow card) 59' (goal) 86'; Kanaanizadegan 76' (pen.); Esmaeilifar 78'; Urunov 90+6' (yellow card) 90+7'		Kazemi 4', 45+3'; Roberto (yellow card) 16' (yellow-red card) 57'; Rostam 41'; Motlaghzadeh (yellow card) 73'	Stadium: Azadi Stadium; Attendance: 50,000; Referee: Kopal Nazemi

28 May 2024 29	Shams Azar	1–3	Persepolis	Qazvin
20:00 IRST (UTC+03:30)	Emamali (yellow card) 15'; Papi 51'; Rezaei (yellow card) 71'		Urunov 19'; Rigi 60'; Jafarpour 90' (.o.g)	Stadium: Sardar Azadegan; Attendance: 15,000; Referee: Mouood Bonyadifar

1 June 2024 30	Persepolis	1–0	Mes Rafsanjan	Tehran
19:00 IRST (UTC+03:30)	Torabi (yellow card) 3'; Rafiei (yellow card) 51'; Alekasir (yellow card) 63'; Gvelesiani 86'		Bagheri (yellow card) 6'; Lak (yellow card) 77'; Alimohammadi (yellow card) 90'	Stadium: Azadi Stadium; Attendance: 50,000; Referee: Amir Arab Baraghi

==== Score overview ====
Win Draw Loss

Opposition	Home score	Away score	Aggregate score
Aluminium	1–0	0–1	1–1
Esteghlal	1–1	0–0	1–1
Esteghlal Khuzestan	4–3	2–2	6–5
Foolad	4–2	0–2	6–2
Gol Gohar	1–0	0–1	2–0
Havadar	1–0	0–2	3–0
Malavan	1–0	0–0	1–0
Mes Rafsanjan	1–0	1–1	2–1
Nassaji	1–0	1–2	3–1
Paykan	2–0	1–3	5–1
Sanat Naft	2–2	0–3	5–2
Sepahan	0–0	0–1	0–1
Shams Azar	2–1	1–3	5–2
Tractor	2–0	0–1	3–0
Zob Ahan	1–1	0–1	2–1

=== Hazfi Cup ===
Win Draw Loss Postponed

4 March 2023 Round of 32	Persepolis	3 – 0	Naft va Gaz Gachsaran	Tehran
20:00 IRST (UTC+03:30)	Torabi 38'; Esmaeilifar 47'; Alekasir 55'		Jafarikia (yellow card) 74'; Monsef (yellow card) 76'; Tajik (yellow card) 83'	Stadium: Azadi; Referee: Keivan Alimohammadi

26 April 2024 Round of 16	Aluminium	4 – 4 (a.e.t.) (6–5 p)	Persepolis	Arak
18:15 IRST (UTC+03:30)	Haji Eydi (yellow card) 17'; Jahan Kohan (yellow card) 66'; Badragheh (yellow card) 73'; Limouchi 85' (yellow card) 120'; Bozorg 90+5', 111'; Ghahhari (yellow card) 98'; Noori (yellow card) 103'; Naghizadeh 120+1'		Urunov 11'; Alekasir 25', 108'; Rafiei (yellow card) 17'; Khodabandelou (yellow card) 27'; Asadbeigi (yellow card) 77' (goal) 94'; Kanaanizadegan (yellow card) 94'	Stadium: Imam Khomeini; Referee: Amir Arab Baraghi
	Penalties
	Noori (penalty missed); Mousavi (penalty scored); Limouchi (penalty scored); Haji Eydi (penalty scored); Jabireh (penalty scored); Vatan Doust (penalty scored); Naghizadeh (penalty scored)		Kanaanizadegan (penalty scored); Nemati (penalty scored); Esmaeilifar (penalty missed); Asadbeigi (penalty scored); Gvelesiani (penalty scored); Faraji (penalty scored); Amiri (penalty missed)

=== 2023–24 AFC Champions League ===
==== Group stage ====
Pos	Team	Pld	W	D	L	GF	GA	GD	Pts	Qualification	NSR	PRS	DUH	IST
1	(Saudi Arabia) Al Nassr	6	4	2	0	13	7	+6	14	Advance to round of 16	—	0–0	4–3	3–1
2	(Iran) Persepolis	6	2	2	2	5	5	0	8		0–2	—	1–2	2–0
3	(Qatar) Al-Duhail	6	2	1	3	9	9	0	7		2–3	0–1	—	2–0
4	(Tajikistan) Istiklol	6	0	3	3	3	9	−6	3		1–1	1–1	0–0	—

Source: AFC
Rules for classification: Tiebreakers

===== Matches =====
Win Draw Loss Postponed

19 September 2023 1	Persepolis	0 – 2	(Saudi Arabia) Al Nassr	Tehran
	Sarlak (yellow card) 18' (yellow-red card) 52'; Rigi (yellow card) 55'		Brozović (yellow card) 45+2'; Esmaeilifar 62' (o.g.); Qassem 72'	Stadium: Azadi Stadium; Attendance: 0 Referee: Ilgiz Tantashev (Uzbekistan); Man of the Match: Mohammad Qassem (Al Nassr)

3 October 2023 2	Al-Duhail (Qatar)	0 – 1	Persepolis	Doha
	Almoez Ali (yellow card) 78'; Aymen (yellow card) 90+1'		Alishah 63'	Stadium: Abdullah bin Khalifa Stadium; Attendance: 5,000; Referee: Hiroyuki Kimura (Japan); Man of the Match: Omid Alishah (Persepolis)

24 October 2023 3	Persepolis	2 – 0	(Tajikistan) Istiklol	Tehran
	Sadeghi 44', 73' Rafiei (yellow card) 45' Gvelesiani (yellow card) 63'		Sebai (penalty missed)	Stadium: Azadi Stadium; Attendance: 36,450; Referee: Mohannad Ghasem; Man of the Match: Saeid Sadeghi (Persepolis)

6 November 2023 4	Istiklol (Tajikistan)	1 – 1	Persepolis	Dushanbe
	Dzhalilov (yellow card) 18' Kurbonov (yellow card) 43' Davlatmir (yellow card) 65' Sebai 74'		Gvelesiani (yellow card) 8' Torabi 29'	Stadium: Pamir Stadium; Referee: Ahmed Al Ali; Man of the Match: Alireza Beiranvand (Persepolis)

27 November 2023 5	(Saudi Arabia) Al Nassr	0 – 0	Persepolis	Riyadh
	Lajami (red card) 17' Brozovic (yellow card) 59'		Zahedi (yellow card) 43' Alishah (yellow card) 44' Rafiei (yellow card) 45+4'	Stadium: KSU Stadium; Referee: Ma Ning

11 December 2023 6	Persepolis	1 – 2	(Qatar) Al-Duhail	Tehran
	Zahedi 7' Sarlak (yellow card) 26' Gvelesiani (penalty missed) (yellow card) 90+6'		Muntari 9' Mohammad (yellow card) 43' Musa (yellow card) 48' Aymen (yellow card) 82' Olunga 83' Zakaria (yellow card) 88'	Stadium: Azadi Stadium; Attendance: 60,000; Referee: Kimura Hiroyuki

== Statistics ==
=== Goal scorers ===
Player left the club during the season.

Place	Position	Nation	Number	Name	PGPL	Hazfi Cup	ACL	Total
1	FW	(Iran)	72	Issa Alekasir	7	3	0	10
2	FW	(Iran)	20	Shahab Zahedi	6	0	1	7
2	MF	(Uzbekistan)	70	Oston Urunov	6	1	0	7
3	DF	(Iran)	6	Hossein Kanaanizadegan	6	0	0	6
3	DF	(Georgia (country))	30	Giorgi Gvelesiani	6	0	0	6
4	MF	(Iran)	9	Mehdi Torabi	2	1	1	4
5	MF	(Iran)	21	Saeid Sadeghi	1	0	2	3
5	MF	(Iran)	11	Danial Esmaeilifar	2	1	0	3
6	MF	(Iran)	2	Omid Alishah	1	0	1	2
7	DF	(Iran)	4	Ali Nemati	1	0	0	1
7	DF	(Iran)	8	Morteza Pouraliganji	1	0	0	1
7	MF	(Iran)	88	Sina Asadbeigi	0	1	0	1
7	MF	(Iran)	80	Yasin Salmani	1	0	0	1
7	MF	(Iran)	77	Mohammad Omri	1	0	0	1
7	FW	(Sweden)	14	Nabil Bahoui	1	0	0	1
7	MF	(Iran)	5	Masoud Rigi	1	0	0	1
7	Own goal				2	0	0	2
Total					45	7	5	57
Last updated: 1 June 2024

=== Assists ===
Player left the club during the season.

Place	Position	Nation	Number	Name	PGPL	Hazfi Cup	ACL	Total
1	MF	(Iran)	9	Mehdi Torabi	6	1	0	7
2	DF	(Iran)	11	Danial Esmaeilifar	6	0	0	6
2	MF	(Iran)	2	Omid Alishah	6	0	0	6
3	MF	(Iran)	7	Soroush Rafiei	3	0	1	4
3	MF	(Iran)	19	Vahid Amiri	4	0	0	4
4	MF	(Iran)	5	Masoud Rigi	1	0	1	2
4	FW	(Iran)	20	Shahab Zahedi	1	0	1	2
4	MF	(Iran)	88	Sina Asadbeigi	1	1	0	2
4	DF	(Iran)	6	Hossein Kanaanizadegan	2	0	0	2
5	DF	(Qatar)	33	Abdelkarim Hassan	0	1	0	1
5	MF	(Uzbekistan)	70	Oston Urunov	0	1	0	1
5	MF	(Iran)	48	Mohammad Milad Sourgi	0	1	0	1
5	FW	(Iran)	72	Issa Alekasir	1	0	0	1
Total					31	5	3	39
Last updated: 1 June 2024

=== Goalkeeping ===
				PGPL			Hazfi Cup			ACL			Total		
Rank	No	N	Name	M	GA	CS	M	GA	CS	M	GA	CS	M	GA	CS
1	1	(Iran)	Alireza Beiranvand	26	18	13	1	0	1	6	5	3	33	23	17
2	22	(Iran)	Amir Reza Rafiei	4	0	4	1	4	0	0	0	0	5	4	4
Total				30	18	17	2	4	1	6	5	3	38	27	21
Last updated: 1 June 2024

== Injury records ==
=== Injuries During The Season ===
Number	Position	Nation	Name	Injuri	From	Until	Days
29	FW	(Iran)	Alireza Khodadadi	Cruciate Ligament Injury	Aug 4, 2023	Nov 4, 2023	92
35	MF	(Iran)	Alireza Enayatzadeh	Cruciate Ligament Rupture	Aug 14, 2023	Feb 14, 2024	184
1	GK	(Iran)	Alireza Beiranvand	Leg Injury	Sep 7, 2023	Sep 18, 2023	11
14	FW	(Sweden)	Nabil Bahoui	Cold	Sep 15, 2023	Sep 30, 2023	15
9	MF	(Iran)	Mehdi Torabi	Foot Injury	Sep 19, 2023	Oct 3, 2023	14
19	MF	(Iran)	Vahid Amiri	Leg Injury	Sep 19, 2023	Oct 10, 2023	21
Last updated: 22 September 2023

== Club ==
=== Kit ===
Supplier: (Iran) Merooj

=== Sponsorship ===
sponsors: Irancell
