= 2024–25 Persepolis F.C. season =

Persepolis
2024–25 season
- President: Reza Darvish
- Head coach: Juan Carlos Garrido (until Dec. 22, 2024); Karim Bagheri (interim, from dec.22 until jan.23,2025); Ismail Kartal (from 25 jan,2025)
- Stadium: Azadi Stadium & Shahr-e Qods Martyrs Stadium
- Persian Gulf Pro League: 3rd
- Hazfi Cup: Round of 8th
- Iranian Super Cup: Runners-up
- AFC Champions League Elite: League stage
- Top goalscorer: League: Ali Alipour (12); All: Ali Alipour (15)
Home colours	Away colours	Third colours

The 2024–25 season was the Persepolis's 24th season in the Persian Gulf Pro League, and their 42nd consecutive season in the top division of Iranian Football. In addition to the domestic league, Persepolis also participated in this season's Hazfi Cup, Iranian Super Cup, and the AFC Champions League Elite.

== Squad ==
No.	Name	Age	Nationality	Position (s)	Since	App	Goals	Assist	Ends	Signed from	Transfer fee	Notes
1	Alexis Guendouz	28	(Algeria)	GK	2024	0	0	0	2027	(Algeria) CR Belouizdad	Free	
22	Amir Reza Rafiei	22	(Iran)	GK	2022	0	0	0	2025	Nassaji	Free	U-23
44	Mehrshad Asadi	23	(Iran)	GK	2022	0	0	0	2027	Academy	Free	U-23
Defenders
3	Farshad Faraji	30	(Iran)	DF	2021	53	1	0	2025	Padideh	Free	
4	Milad Mohammadi	31	(Iran)	DF	2024	0	0	0	2026	(Turkey) Adana Demirspor	Free	
6	Hossein Kanaanizadegan	30	(Iran)	DF	2023	69	3	1	2025	(Qatar) Al Ahli	Free	
8	Morteza Pouraliganji	32	(Iran)	DF	2022	40	3	1	2025	(China) Shenzhen	Free	
20	Ayoub El Amloud	30	(Morocco)	DF	2022	0	0	0	2025	(Morocco) Wydad AC	Free	
30	Giorgi Gvelesiani	33	(Georgia (country))	DF	2022	29	6	0	2025	Sepahan	Free	
37	Yaghoub Barage	18	(Iran)	DF	2024	1	0	0	2028	Academy	Free	U-19
76	Soheil Sahraei	21	(Iran)	DF	2023	6	0	0	2028	Academy	Free	U-23
Midfielders
2	Omid Alishah	32	(Iran)	MF	2013	215	18	41	2025	Rah Ahan	Free	Captain
5	Masoud Rigi	33	(Iran)	MF	2023	0	0	0	2025	Sepahan	Free	
7	Soroush Rafiei	34	(Iran)	MF	2022	63	6	5	2024	Sepahan	Free	
11	Farshad Ahmadzadeh	32	(Iran)	MF	2024	156	14	15	2026	Sepahan	Free	
14	Alireza Enayatzadeh	20	(Iran)	MF	2023	0	0	0	2028	Academy	Free	U-21
19	Vahid Amiri	36	(Iran)	MF	2016	193	20	31	2024	(Turkey) Trabzonspor	Free	2nd Captain
21	Saeid Sadeghi	30	(Iran)	MF	2022	24	6	3	2025	Gol Gohar	Free	
23	Milad Sarlak	30	(Iran)	MF	2020	133	6	5	2027	Shahr Khodro	Free	
27	Saeid Mehri	26	(Iran)	MF	2024	23	0	0	2026	APOEL	Free	
70	Oston Urunov	24	(Uzbekistan)	MF	2024	0	0	0	2025	(Uzbekistan) Navbahor	Free	
77	Mohammad Khodabandelou	25	(Iran)	MF	2024	0	0	0	2025	Mes Rafsanjan	€160,000	
80	Yasin Salmani	22	(Iran)	MF	2023	18	1	0	2027	Sepahan	Free	U-23
Forwards
9	Ali Alipour	29	(Iran)	FW	2024	198	67	30	2026	(Portugal) Gil Vicente	Free	
10	Issa Alekasir	34	(Iran)	FW	2024	51	14	0	2025	Sepahan	Free	
18	Abolfazl Babaei	21	(Iran)	FW	2023	0	0	0	2026	Fajr Sepasi	Free	U-21
29	Alireza Khodadadi	22	(Iran)	FW	2022	1	0	0	2027	Academy	Free	U-21
32	Omid Fahmi	22	(Iran)	FW	2023	0	0	0	2026	Academy	Free	U-21
91	Serdar Dursun	33	(Turkey)	FW	2025	12	5	0	2026	Alanyaspor	Free	
Players left the club during the season
88	Sina Asadbeigi	27	(Iran)	MF	2022	26	2	1	2025	Transfer to Foolad		
31	Lucas João	31	(Angola)	FW	2024	7	0	0	2025	Transfer to Ümraniyespor		

Last updated: 24 January 2024.

== Transfers ==
=== In ===
Row	No	P	Nat.	Name	Age	Moving from	Ends	Transfer fee	Type	Transfer window	Quota	Source
1	9	FW	(Iran)	Ali Alipour	28	(Portugal) Gil Vicente	2026	free	Transfer	Summer		
2	20	DF	(Morocco)	Ayoub El Amloud	30	(Morocco) Wydad	2025	free	Transfer	Summer		
3	11	FW	(Iran)	Farshad Ahmadzadeh	28	Sepahan	2025	free	Transfer	Summer	PL	
4	1	GK	(Algeria)	Alexis Guendouz	28	(Algeria) Belouizdad	2027	200k US$	Transfer	Summer		
5	4	DF	(Iran)	Milad Mohammadi	30	(Turkey) Adana Demirspor	2026	free	Transfer	Summer		

=== Out ===
Row	No	P	Nat.	Name	Age	Moving to	Transfer fee	Type	Transfer window	Source
1	66	DF	(Tajikistan)	Vahdat Hanonov	23	Sepahan	free	Transfer	Summer	
2	15	DF	(Iran)	Abolfazl Soleimani	23	Aluminium Arak	free	Transfer	Summer	
3	1	GK	(Iran)	Alireza Beiranvand	32	Tractor	free	Transfer	Summer	
4	11	DF	(Iran)	Danial Esmaeilifar	31	Tractor	free	Transfer	Summer	
5	9	MF	(Iran)	Mehdi Torabi	29	Tractor	free	Transfer	Summer	
6	33	MF	(Qatar)	Abdelkarim Hassan	30	(Qatar) Al-Wakrah	1.3 million US$	Transfer	Summer	
7	11	DF	(Iran)	Ali Nemati	28	Foolad	free	Transfer	Summer	

== Technical staff ==
=== Kartal staff ===
Position	Staff
Head coach	(Turkey) İsmail Kartal
First-team coach	(Turkey) Sercan Terzioğlu
Assistant coaches	(Iran) Karim Bagheri
Goalkeeping coach	(Turkey) Haluk Kaplan
Assistant Goalkeeping coach	(Iran) Javad Bagheri
Fitness and Athletic Coach	(Turkey) Cengiz Sirkan
Assistant Fitness Coach	(Iran) Saman Eskandari
Analyzers	(Iran) Mehrdad Khanban (Turkey) Kerem Güneş (Iran) Siamak Tehrani
Doctor	(Iran) DR Alireza Ghalyayi
Head of the medical committee	(Iran) DR Farid Zarineh
Physiotherapist	(Iran) Ali Aazam
Team Manager	(Iran) Afshin Peyrovani
Media Officer	(Iran) Alireza Ashraf

=== Garrido staff ===
Position	Staff
Head coach	(Spain) Juan Carlos Garrido
First-team coach	(Spain) Xavi Oliva (Iran) Karim Bagheri
Assistant coaches	(Iran) Jalal Hosseini
Goalkeeping coach	(Brazil) Jorcey Anísio
Assistant Goalkeeping coach	(Iran) Javad Bagheri
Fitness Coach	(Morocco) Idriss Saissi
Assistant Fitness Coach	(Iran) Saman Eskandari
Analyzers	(Iran) Mehrdad Khanban (Iran) Siamak Tehrani
Doctor	(Iran) DR Alireza Ghalyayi
Head of the medical committee	(Iran) DR Farid Zarineh
Physiotherapist	(Iran) Ali Aazam
Team Manager	(Iran) Afshin Peyrovani
Media Officer	(Iran) Alireza Ashraf

Position	Staff
Under-23 team coach	(Iran) Mahmoud Ansari
Youth team coach	(Iran) Mehdi Ataloo
Under-17 coach	(Iran) Farzad Ashoubi
Under-14 coach	(Iran) Hassan Khanmohammadi

== Pre-season and friendlies ==
=== Pre-season ===
Win Draw Loss Fixtures

== Competitions ==
=== Overview ===
Competition	First match	Last match	Starting round	Final position	Record							
Competition	First match	Last match	Starting round	Final position	Pld	W	D	L	GF	GA	GD	Win %
PGPL	15 August 2024	15 May 2025	Matchday 1	3rd	30	18	6	6	42	20	+22	60.00
Hazfi Cup	21 November 2024	12 February 2025	Round of 32	Round of 8	2	1	0	1	5	3	+2	50.00
Super Cup	17 January 2025		Final	Runner-up	1	0	0	1	0	1	−1	0.00
ACLE	16 September 2024	17 February 2025	Group stage	Group stage	8	1	4	3	6	10	−4	12.50
Total					41	20	10	11	53	34	+19	48.78

Last updated: 15 May 2025
Source: Competitions

=== Persian Gulf Pro League ===
==== League table ====
Pos	Team	Pld	W	D	L	GF	GA	GD	Pts	Qualification or relegation
1	Tractor (C)	30	21	5	4	57	19	+38	68	Qualification for the 2025–26 AFC Champions League Elite phase
2	Sepahan	30	16	12	2	48	21	+27	60 (Note: Sepahan finished ahead of Persepolis on head-to-head points: Sepahan 6, Persepolis 0)	Qualification for the 2025–26 AFC Champions League Elite qualifying play-offs
3	Persepolis	30	18	6	6	42	20	+22	60	
4	Foolad	30	15	8	7	36	30	+6	53	
5	Gol Gohar	30	12	11	7	23	16	+7	47	

Source: Iran Football League Organization - League Full Table, Iplstats
Rules for classification: 1) Points; 2) Head-to-head points; 3) Head-to-head goal difference; 4) Total goal difference; 5) Total goals scored; 6) Fair-play points.
(Note: Head-to-head record is used only after all the matches between the teams in question have been played).
(C) Champions

==== Results summary ====
Overall								Home						Away					
Pld	W	D	L	GF	GA	GD	Pts	W	D	L	GF	GA	GD	W	D	L	GF	GA	GD
30	18	6	6	42	20	+22	60	10	2	3	20	9	+11	8	4	3	22	11	+11

Last updated: 15 May 2025.
Source: سازمان لیگ ورزش ۳

==== Results by round ====
Round	1	2	3	4	5	6	7	8	9	10	11	12	13	14	15	16	17	18	19	20	21	22	23	24	25	26	27	28	29	30
Ground	H	A	H	A	H	A	H	A	H	A	H	A	H	H	A	A	H	A	H	A	H	A	H	A	H	A	H	A	A	H
Result	D	D	W	W	W	W	W	W	W	L	L	L	L	W	W	D	W	D	W	D	W	W	W	L	D	W	L	W	W	W
Position	7	8	5	2	4	4	2	3	1	4	3	4	4	3	3	4	4	4	3	3	3	3	2	3	3	3	3	3	3	3
Points	1	2	5	20	8	11	14	23	17	17	20	23	23	26	29	30	33	34	37	38	41	43	47	47	48	51	51	54	57	60

Updated to match(es) played on 15 May 2025. Source: "iranleague".
A = Away; H = Home; W = Win; D = Draw; L = Loss

==== Matches ====
Win Draw Loss Postponed

15 August 2024 1	Persepolis	1–1	Zob Ahan	Arak
19:30 IRST (UTC+03:30)	Sadeghi 45+2'	Report	Aliyari 1'	Stadium: Imam Khomeini Stadium; Referee: Bijan Heidari
Note: This game was played in this stadium because Azadi Stadium was under construction.

22 August 2024 2	Tractor	1–1	Persepolis	Tabriz
19:45 IRST (UTC+03:30)	Khalilzadeh 60'	Report	El Amloud 89'	Stadium: Yadegar-e Emam Stadium; Attendance: 90,000; Referee: Vahid Kazemi
Note: Game was started with 12 minite late.

30 August 2024 3	Persepolis	2–0	Foolad	Qazvin
19:30 IRST (UTC+03:30)	Urunov 65'; Amiri 82'	Report		Stadium: Sardar Azadegan Stadium; Referee: Payam Heidari
Note: This game played in this stadium because Azadi Stadium was under construction and started with 12 minutes late.

9 November 2024 4	Gol Gohar	0–1	Persepolis	Sirjan
16:15 IRST (UTC+03:30)		Report	Amiri 52'	Stadium: Shahid Soleimani Stadium; Referee: Amir Arab Baraghi

20 September 2024 5	Persepolis	2–0	Aluminium	Shahr-e Qods
20:00 IRST (UTC+03:30)	Kanaanizadegan 5' (pen.); Alipour 70'	Report		Stadium: Shahr-e Qods Martyrs Stadium; Referee: Mohammad Hosein Zahedifard
Note: This game played in this Staduim because Azadi Stadium was Under construction.

25 September 2024 6	Esteghlal	0–1	Persepolis	Arak
19:00 IRST (UTC+03:30)		Report	Kanaanizadegan 90+3' (pen.)	Stadium: Imam Khomeini Stadium; Attendance: 10,000; Referee: Bijan Heidari
Note: This game played in this Staduim because Azadi Stadium was Under construction.

5 October 2024 7	Persepolis	1–0	Chadormalou	Tehran
17:00 IRST (UTC+03:30)	Gvelesiani 90+6'	Report		Stadium: Takhti Stadium; Referee: Ahmad Mohammadi
Note: This game played in this Staduim because Azadi Stadium was Under construction.

11 December 2024 8	Malavan	1–2	Persepolis	Bandar-e Anzali
16:15 IRST (UTC+03:30)	Eslamikhah 59'	Report	Rafiei 64'; Faraji 74'	Stadium: Sirous Ghayeghran Stadium; Referee: Ahmad Mohammadi

26 October 2024 9	Persepolis	2–0	Shams Azar	Shahr-e Qods
19:15 IRST (UTC+03:30)	Alipour 11'; Amiri 90+1'	Report		Stadium: Shahr-e Qods Martyrs Stadium; Referee: Mouood Bonyadifar
Note: This game played in this Staduim because Azadi Stadium was Under construction.

30 October 2024 10	Esteghlal Khuzestan	1–0	Persepolis	Ahvaz
18:00 IRST (UTC+03:30)	Motlaghzadeh 6'	Report		Stadium: Ghadir Stadium; Referee: Hassan Akrami

7 December 2024 11	Persepolis	0–1	Nassaji	Shahr-e Qods
16:15 IRST (UTC+03:30)		Report	Yamga 25'	Stadium: Shahr-e Qods Martyrs Stadium; Referee: Bijan Heidari
Note: This game played in this Staduim because Azadi Stadium was Under construction.

16 December 2024 12	Sepahan	2–1	Persepolis	Esfahan
15:15 IRST (UTC+03:30)	Hazbavi 16'; Limouchi 71'	Report	Khodabandelou 25'	Stadium: Naghsh-e Jahan; Referee: Vahid Kazemi

21 December 2024 13	Persepolis	1–3	Mes Rafsanjan	Shahr-e Qods
17:30 IRST (UTC+03:30)	Alipour 78' (pen.)	Report	Joulani 4'; Schulz 34'; Alinejad 90+11'	Stadium: Shahr-e Qods Martyrs Stadium; Referee: Mohammad Hosein Zahedifard
Note: This game played in this Staduim because Azadi Stadium was Under construction.

27 December 2024 14	Persepolis	2–1	Kheybar	Shahr-e Qods
17:30 IRST (UTC+03:30)	Alipour 53'; Alekasir 84'	Report	Rostami 22'	Stadium: Shahr-e Qods Martyrs Stadium; Referee: Mouood Bonyadifar
Note: This game played in this Staduim because Azadi Stadium was Under construction.

1 January 2025 15	Havadar	0–5	Persepolis	Shahr-e Qods
17:30 IRST (UTC+03:30)		Report	Alipour 17', 52', 79'; Alekasir 67'; Urunov 85'	Stadium: Shahr-e Qods Martyrs Stadium; Referee: Ali Safaei

21 January 2025 16	Zob Ahan	0–0	Persepolis	Fuladshahr
16:45 IRST (UTC+03:30)		Report		Stadium: Foolad Shahr Stadium; Referee: Vahid Zamani

26 January 2025 17	Persepolis	2–0	Tractor	Tehran
15:00 IRST (UTC+03:30)	Rafiei 11'; Gvelesiani 73'	Report		Stadium: Azadi Stadium; Attendance: 52,000; Referee: Bijan Heidari
Note: Game was started with 12 minite late.

31 January 2025 18	Foolad	1–1	Persepolis	Ahvaz
16:00 IRST (UTC+03:30)	Zadeh Attar 78'	Report	Alekasir 39'	Stadium: Foolad Arena; Referee: Amir Arab Baraghi

8 February 2025 19	Persepolis	1–0	Gol Gohar	Shahr-e Qods
17:00 IRST (UTC+03:30)	Dursun 73'	Report		Stadium: Shahr-e Qods Martyrs Stadium; Referee: Vahid Kazemi
Note: This game played in this Staduim because Azadi Stadium was Under construction.

22 February 2025 20	Aluminium	1–1	Persepolis	Arak
16:15 IRST (UTC+03:30)	Haji Eydi 67'	Report	Alipour 88'	Stadium: Imam Khomeini Stadium; Referee: Ahmad Mohammadi

27 February 2025 21	Persepolis	2–1	Esteghlal	Tehran
17:15 IRST (UTC+03:30)	Kanaanizadegan 45+4' (pen.); Alipour 71'	Report	Koushki 55'	Stadium: Azadi Stadium; Referee: Payam Heidari

7 March 2025 22	Chadormalou	0–1	Persepolis	Yazd
19:00 IRST (UTC+03:30)		Report	Dursun 15'	Stadium: Shahid Nasiri Stadium; Attendance: 15,000; Referee: Amir Arab Baraghi

14 March 2025 23	Persepolis	2–0	Malavan	Tehran
17:15 IRST (UTC+03:30)	Alipour 16'; Dursun 67'	Report		Stadium: Azadi Stadium; Referee: Hassan Akrami

30 March 2025 24	Shams Azar	3–2	Persepolis	Qazvin
19:15 IRST (UTC+03:30)	Fakhrian 12'; Koumar 55'; Azadeh 79'	Report	Dursun 25'; Sarlak 88'	Stadium: Sardar Azadegan Stadium; Referee: Reza Mahdavi

5 April 2025 25	Persepolis	0–0	Esteghlal Khuzestan	Tehran
18:00 IRST (UTC+03:30)		Report		Stadium: Azadi Stadium; Referee: Vahid Kazemi

11 April 2025 26	Nassaji	0–1	Persepolis	Qaem Shahr
18:00 IRST (UTC+03:30)	Yamga (penalty missed)	Report	Enayatzadeh 65'	Stadium: Vatani Stadium; Referee: Kopal Nazemi

18 April 2025 27	Persepolis	0–2	Sepahan	Tehran
18:00 IRST (UTC+03:30)		Report	Mohebi 2'; Gvelesiani 12' (o.g.)	Stadium: Azadi Stadium; Referee: Mouood Bonyadifar

1 May 2025 28	Mes Rafsanjan	0–3	Persepolis	Rafsanjan
19:15 IRST (UTC+03:30)		Report	Alipour 5', 45+2'; Dursun 44'	Stadium: Shohadaye Mes Rafsanjan Stadium; Referee: Ahmad Mohammadi

8 May 2025 29	Kheybar	1–2	Persepolis	Khorramabad
19:30 IRST (UTC+03:30)	Amiri 25'	Report	Ahmadzadeh 65'; Urunov 90+1'	Stadium: Takhti Stadium; Referee: Payam Heidari

15 May 2025 30	Persepolis	2–0	Havadar	Tehran
19:30 IRST (UTC+03:30)	Urunov 82'; Barage 90+8'	Report		Stadium: Azadi Stadium; Referee: Bijan Heidari

==== Score overview ====
Win Draw Loss

Opposition	Home score	Away score	Aggregate score
Aluminium	2–0	1–1	3–1
Chadormalou	1–0	0–1	2–0
Esteghlal	2–1	0–1	3–1
Esteghlal Khuzestan	0–0	1–0	0–1
Foolad	2–0	1–1	3–1
Gol Gohar	1–0	0–1	2–0
Havadar	2–0	0–5	0–7
Kheybar	2–1	1–2	4–2
Malavan	2–0	1–2	4–1
Mes Rafsanjan	1–3	0–3	4–3
Nassaji	0–1	0–1	1–1
Sepahan	0–2	2–1	1–4
Shams Azar	2–0	3–2	4–3
Tractor	2–0	1–1	3–1
Zob Ahan	1–1	0–0	1–1

=== Hazfi Cup ===
Win Draw Loss Postponed

21 November 2024 Round of 32	Persepolis	3–0	Mes Sungun	Shahr-e Qods
16:15 IRST (UTC+03:30)	Alipour 27'; João 61'; Rigi 87'	Report		Stadium: Shahr-e Qods Martyrs Stadium; Referee: Mohammadreza Tarokh
Note: This game played in this Staduim because Azadi Stadium was Under construction.

12 February 2025 Round of 16	Sepahan	3–2	Persepolis	Esfahan
17:00 IRST (UTC+03:30)	Mohebi 14'; Daneshgar 88'; Zakipour 93'	Report	Alipour 40'; Ahmadzadeh 72'	Stadium: Naghsh-e Jahan; Referee: Bijan Heidari

=== Super Cup ===
Win Draw Loss Postponed

17 January 2025 Super Cup	Persepolis	0–1	Sepahan	Arak
15:00 IRST (UTC+03:30)		Report	Nzonzi; 2'	Stadium: Imam Khomeini Stadium; Referee: Payam Heidari

=== 2024–25 AFC Champions League ===
==== League stage ====
Pos	Team	Pld	W	D	L	GF	GA	GD	Pts	Qualification
1	(Saudi Arabia) Al-Hilal	8	7	1	0	26	7	+19	22	Advance to round of 16
2	(Saudi Arabia) Al-Ahli	8	7	1	0	21	8	+13	22	Advance to round of 16
3	(Saudi Arabia) Al-Nassr	8	5	2	1	17	6	+11	17	Advance to round of 16
4	(Qatar) Al-Sadd	8	3	3	2	10	9	+1	12	Advance to round of 16
5	(United Arab Emirates) Al Wasl	8	3	2	3	8	12	−4	11	Advance to round of 16
6	(Iran) Esteghlal	8	2	3	3	8	9	−1	9	Advance to round of 16
7	(Qatar) Al-Rayyan	8	2	2	4	8	12	−4	8	Advance to round of 16
8	(Uzbekistan) Pakhtakor	8	1	4	3	4	6	−2	7	Advance to round of 16
9	(Iran) Persepolis	8	1	4	3	6	10	−4	7	
10	(Qatar) Al-Gharafa	8	2	1	5	10	18	−8	7	
11	(Iraq) Al-Shorta	8	1	3	4	7	17	−10	6	
12	(United Arab Emirates) Al Ain	8	0	2	6	11	22	−11	2	

Source: Asian Football Confederation
Rules for classification: 1) points; 2) goal difference; 3) number of goals scored; 4) number of matches won; 5) penalty shoot-out if only two teams remain tied and played each other on the final matchday 6) fair play ranking; 7) drawing of lots

===== Matches =====
Win Draw Loss Postponed

16 September 2024 1	Al-Ahli (Saudi Arabia)	1–0	Persepolis	Jeddah
21:30 UTC+3	Kessié 2'; Mahrez (penalty missed)	Report		Stadium: Prince Abdullah Al-Faisal Stadium; Attendance: 15,170; Referee: Adham Makhadmeh (Jordan)

30 September 2024 2	Persepolis	1–1	(Uzbekistan) Pakhtakor	Shahr-e Qods
19:30 IRST (UTC+03:30)	Alipour 1'	Report	Ćeran 59'	Stadium: Shahr-e Qods Martyrs Stadium; Attendance: 6,942; Referee: Abdullah Jamali (Kuwait)
Note: This game played in this Staduim because Azadi Stadium was Under construction.

21 October 2024 3	Al-Sadd (Qatar)	1–0	Persepolis	Doha
19:00 UTC+3	Uribe 45+2'	Report		Stadium: Jassim bin Hamad Stadium; Attendance: 4,071; Referee: Yusuke Araki (Japan)

4 November 2024 4	Persepolis	1–1	(Qatar) Al-Gharafa	Dubai
19:30 IRST (UTC+03:30)	Faraji 53'	Report	Al Ganehi 56'	Stadium: Al Maktoum Stadium; Attendance: 3,941; Referee: Kim Hee-gon (South Korea)
Note: Iranian clubs are required to play their home matches at neutral venues due to security concerns relating to the October 2024 Israeli strikes on Iran.

25 November 2024 5	Al-Rayyan (Qatar)	1–1	Persepolis	Al Rayyan
21:30 IRST (UTC+03:30)	Bencharki 57'	Report	Faraji 17'	Stadium: Ahmad bin Ali Stadium; Attendance: 5,136; Referee: Fo Ming (China)

2 December 2024 6	Persepolis	2–1	(Iraq) Al-Shorta	Doha
17:30 IRST (UTC+03:30)	Urunov 89'; Gvelesiani 90+13'	گزارش خلاصه بازی	M.ali 19'	Stadium: Hamad bin Khalifa Stadium; Attendance: 530; Referee: Kim Dae-yong (South Korea)
Note: Iranian clubs are required to play their home matches at neutral venues due to security concerns relating to the October 2024 Israeli strikes on Iran.

4 February 2025 7	Al-Hilal (Saudi Arabia)	4–1	Persepolis	Riyadh
21:30 IRST (UTC+03:30)	Malvom 10'; Cancelo 25'; Al-Dawsari 38', 45+1'	Report	Gvelesiani 90'	Stadium: Kingdom Arena; Attendance: 24,460; Referee: Ma Ning (China)

17 February 2025 8	Persepolis	0–0	(Saudi Arabia) Al-Nassr	Tehran
17:30 IRST (UTC+03:30)		Report		Stadium: Azadi Stadium; Attendance: 70,350; Referee: Rustam Lutfullin (Uzbekistan)

== Statistics ==
=== Goal scorers ===
Player left the club during the season.

Place	Number	Nation	Position	Name	PGPL	Hazfi Cup	Super Cup	ACLE	Total
1	9	(Iran)	FW	Ali Alipour	12	2		1	15
2	91	(Turkey)	FW	Serdar Dursun	5				5
2	70	(Uzbekistan)	MF	Oston Urunov	4			1	5
3	30	(Georgia (country))	DF	Giorgi Gvelesiani	2			2	4
4	19	(Iran)	MF	Vahid Amiri	3				3
4	10	(Iran)	FW	Issa Alekasir	3				3
4	6	(Iran)	DF	Hossein Kanaanizadegan	3				3
4	3	(Iran)	DF	Farshad Faraji	1			2	3
5	7	(Iran)	MF	Soroush Rafiei	2				2
5	11	(Iran)	MF	Farshad Ahmadzadeh	1	1			2
6	21	(Iran)	MF	Saeid Sadeghi	1				1
6	20	(Morocco)	DF	Ayoub El Amloud	1				1
6	77	(Iran)	MF	Mohammad Khodabandelou	1				1
6	23	(Iran)	MF	Milad Sarlak	1				1
6	14	(Iran)	MF	Alireza Enayatzadeh	1				1
6	37	(Iran)	DF	Yaghoub Barage	1				1
6	31	(Angola)	FW	Lucas João		1			1
6	5	(Iran)	MF	Masoud Rigi		1			1
Total					42	5		6	53
Last updated: 15 May 2025

=== Assists ===
Place	Number	Nation	Position	Name	PGPL	Hazfi Cup	Super Cup	ACLE	Total
1	7	(Iran)	MF	Soroush Rafiei	7				7
2	4	(Iran)	DF	Milad Mohammadi	4	1			5
3	2	(Iran)	MF	Omid Alishah	3	1			4
3	19	(Iran)	MF	Vahid Amiri	2			2	4
4	21	(Iran)	MF	Saeid Sadeghi	3				3
4	9	(Iran)	FW	Ali Alipour	2			1	3
5	31	(Angola)	FW	Lucas João	1	1			2
5	3	(Iran)	DF	Farshad Faraji	1	1			2
5	11	(Iran)	MF	Farshad Ahmadzadeh	2				2
5	77	(Iran)	MF	Mohammad Khodabandelou	2				2
6	6	(Iran)	DF	Hossein Kanaanizadegan	1				1
6	10	(Iran)	FW	Issa Alekasir	1				1
6	76	(Iran)	DF	Sohail Sahraei	1				1
6	70	(Uzbekistan)	MF	Oston Urunov	1				1
6	18	(Iran)	FW	Abolfazl Babaei	1				1
6	37	(Iran)	DF	Yaghoub Barage		1			1
Total					32	5		3	40
Last updated: 15 May 2025

=== Hatricks ===
Place	Player	vs	score	date	Competition
1	Ali Alipour	Havadar	0–5	1 January 2025	PGPL
Last updated: 19 March 2025

=== Clean sheets ===
Rank	No.	Nat.	Player	PGPL	Hazfi Cup	Super Cup	ACLE	Total
1	1	(Algeria)	Alexis Guendouz	14	—	—	1	15
2	22	(Iran)	Amir Reza Rafiei	3	1	—	—	4
3	44	(Iran)	Mehrshad Asadi	—	—	—	—	0
Totals				17	1	0	1	19

== Club ==
=== Kit ===
Supplier: (Iran) Merooj

=== Sponsorship ===
sponsors: Saba Battrey
