= Giorgi Gvelesiani =

Georgian footballer (born 1991)

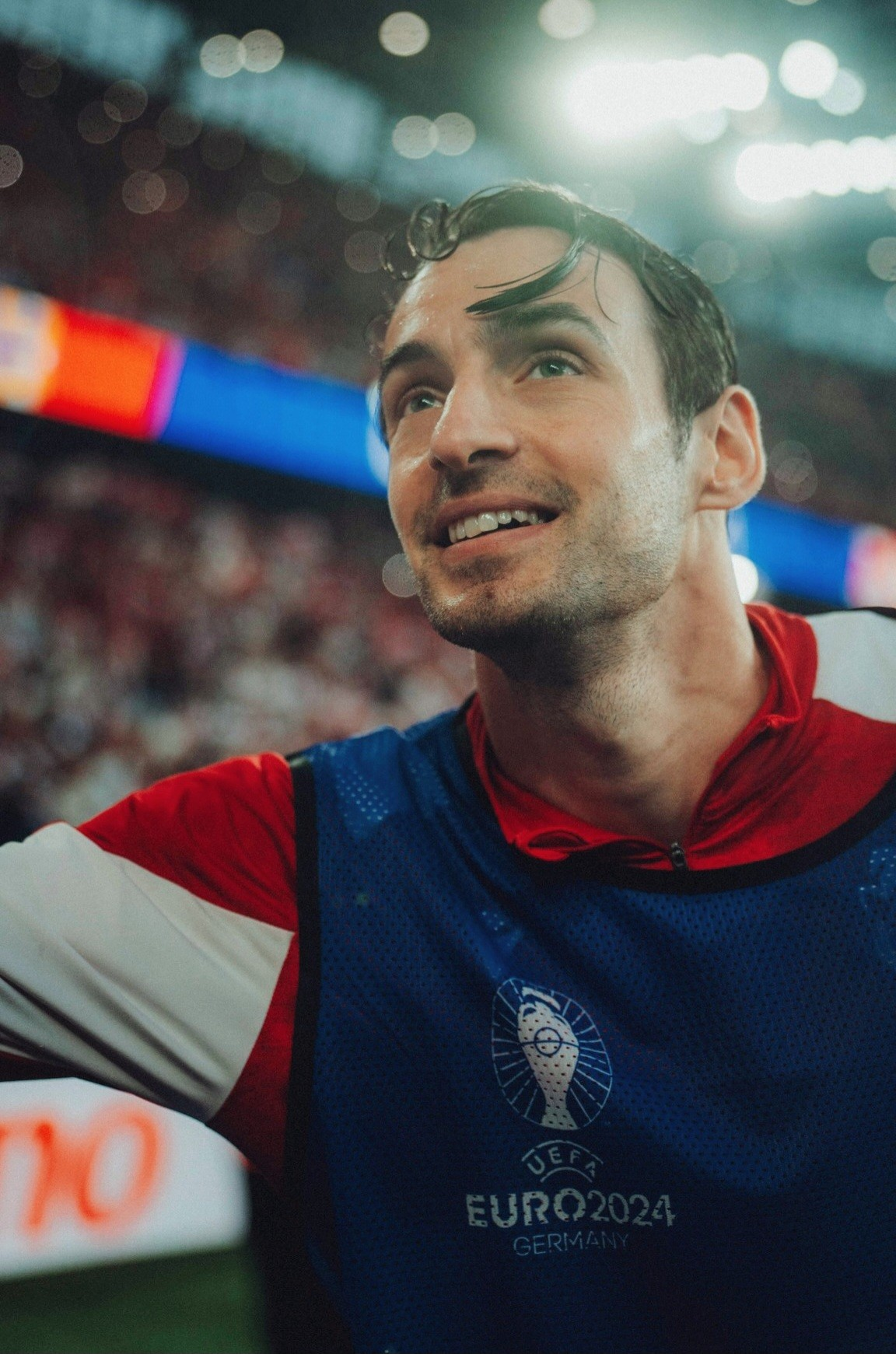
- Gvelesiani with Georgia at the UEFA Euro 2024

Personal information
- Date of birth: 5 May 1991 (age 35)
- Place of birth: Tbilisi, Georgian SSR, Soviet Union
- Height: 1.93 m (6 ft 4 in)
- Positions: Centre-back; defensive midfielder

Youth career
- –2010: Dinamo Tbilisi

Senior career*
Years	Team	Apps	(Gls)
2010–2017	Dinamo Tbilisi	81	(7)
2012–2013	Dinamo-2 Tbilisi	3	(0)
2017–2018	Zob Ahan	20	(0)
2018–2019	Nassaji Mazandaran	22	(5)
2019–2022	Sepahan	62	(9)
2022–2025	Persepolis	81	(14)
2025–2026	Sepahan	1	(0)

International career^{‡}
	Georgia U19	3	(0)
2024–	Georgia	10	(0)
- * Club domestic league appearances and goals as of 15 May 2025 ‡ National team caps and goals as of 8 June 2025

Giorgi Gvelesiani Order of Honor (Georgian: გიორგი გველესიანი; born 5 May 1991) is a Georgian former footballer who played as a centre-back for the Georgia national team.

== Club career ==
=== Dinamo Tbilisi ===
Ending his contract with Dinamo Tbilisi in June 2016, Gvelesiani trained with Ukrainian team Volyn Lutsk soon after. However, his stint there proved transitory as registration problems prevented them from legally letting him play, resulting in him leaving the club in August.

=== Zob Ahan ===
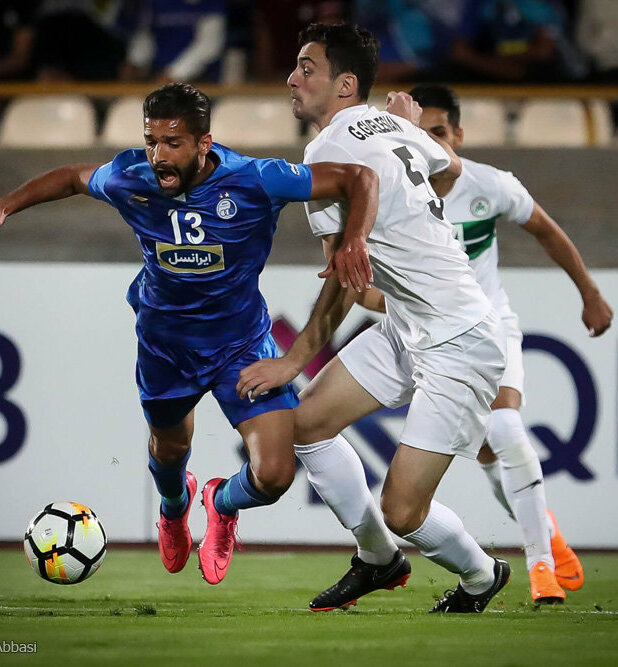
Gvelesiani (right) playing for Zob Ahan against Esteghlal in 2018

Early into summer 2017, the Iranian media spread rumors that a transfer to Persian Gulf Pro League outfit Zob Ahan was imminent for Gvelesiani; he eventually signed for them a few days later. Given a red card for his reckless actions on his debut, the Georgian defender settled well in to the club, forming a good relationship with his teammates and staff.

=== Nassaji Mazandaran ===
On 28 July 2018, Gvelesiani joined Iranian club Nassaji Mazandaran on a one-year deal.

=== Sepahan ===
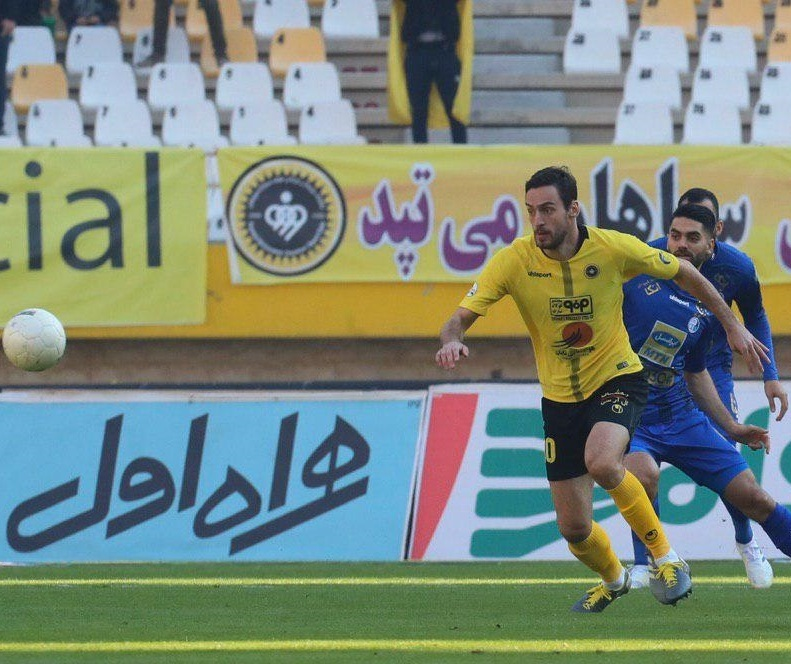
Gvelesiani playing for Sepahan against Esteghlal in 2019

On 12 June 2019, Gvelesiani joined Sepahan S.C. on a two-year deal.

=== Persepolis ===
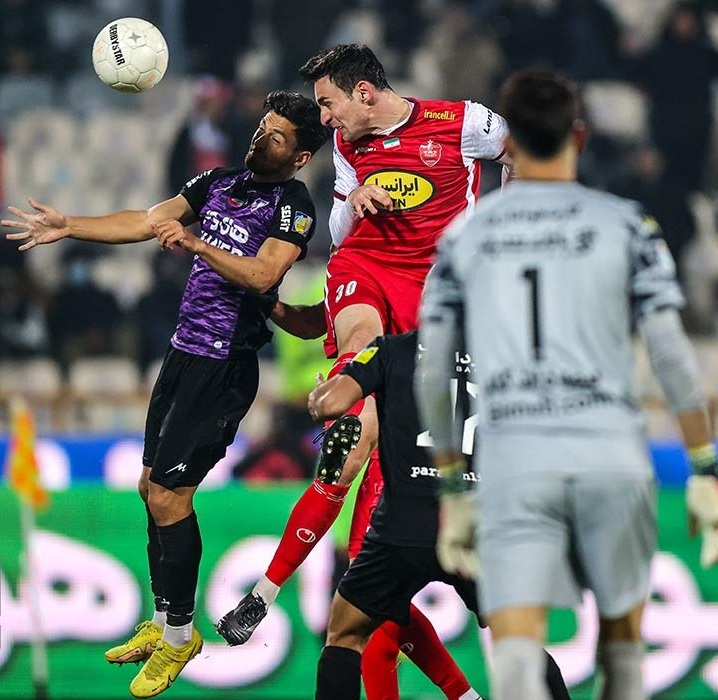
Gvelesiani with Persepolis against Havadar in 2023

On 19 June 2022, Gvelesiani joined Persian Gulf Pro League side Persepolis on a new two-year deal. In December 2022, Gvelesiani gave Persepolis the lead in the 16th minute of Tehran derby against Esteghlal with a header in the box. In the second half, He once again scored with a header in the 89th minute.

He became the first defender in the history of capital derby to score two goals in one game. After his performance in the Tehran derby, he became more popular among Persepolis fans.

He also has become the first choice penalty kick taker at Persepolis. Even in the presence of the team's forwards, he would take penalties. Iranian media wrote about his ability to score penalties.

Among the foreign players in the history of Persepolis club, he is one of the foreign defenders with a significant number of goals. He has usually performed well in important matches for Persepolis, Especially against Esteghlal and Sepahan.

On June 1, 2024, Persepolis played against Mes Rafsanjan on the final game of the season. They had a one-point lead over Esteghlal going into the game, needing to win to guarantee the league title. With the score at 0–0 in the 86th minute and Esteghlal winning 2–0, Gvelesiani scored a header to win the game and secure the title.

== International career ==
Gvelesiani was called up to the Georgia national team for the first time in 2015, and made his debut in a friendly match against Montenegro in June 2024.

Gvelesiani was a member of the squad taking part in Georgia's first major tournament. He played in three of the four matches, including against Spain in the knock-out stage.

== Style of play ==
Gvelesiani has a good ability to score goals and helps the team when scoring becomes difficult for the forwards.

== Personal life ==
He has mentioned that his sleep time varies and sometimes he stays up late. He added: "I am not super professional and sometimes I sleep at 2 or 3, eat whatever I want and wake up whenever I want. I don't think football has anything to do with this. Football depends on your personality and that is the most important issue. I try to keep the middle; I am not a fully professional guy and I live a normal life. The secret of success is that I try to give 100% of my game on the field and even in training I always try to win; This is the secret of my personality".

== Career statistics ==
=== Club ===
As of match played 21 November 2025

Appearances and goals by club, season and competition
Club	Season	League			National cup (Note: Includes Georgian Cup, Hazfi Cup)		Continental		Other		Total	
Club	Season	Division	Apps	Goals	Apps	Goals	Apps	Goals	Apps	Goals	Apps	Goals
Dinamo Tbilisi	2010–11	Umaglesi Liga	2	0	0	0	0	0	0	0	2	0
Dinamo Tbilisi	2011–12	Umaglesi Liga	6	0	2	0	2 (Note: Appearances in UEFA Europa League)	0	0	0	10	0
Dinamo Tbilisi	2012–13	Umaglesi Liga	5	0	2	0	—		—		7	0
Dinamo Tbilisi	2013–14	Umaglesi Liga	16	3	4	1	2 (Note: Appearances in UEFA Champions League)	0	1 (Note: Appearance in Georgian Super Cup)	0	23	4
Dinamo Tbilisi	2014–15	Umaglesi Liga	15	1	3	0	2	0	1	0	21	1
Dinamo Tbilisi	2016	Umaglesi Liga	21	2	3	0	1	0	1	0	26	2
Dinamo Tbilisi	2017	Umaglesi Liga	16	1	1	0	—		—		16	1
Dinamo Tbilisi	Total		81	7	15	1	7	0	3	0	106	8
Zob Ahan	2017–18	Persian Gulf Pro League	20	0	1	0	9 (Note: Appearances in AFC Champions League)	1	—		30	1
Nassaji	2018–19	Persian Gulf Pro League	22	5	1	0	—		—		23	5
Sepahan	2019–20	Persian Gulf Pro League	16	4	2	0	3	0	—		21	4
Sepahan	2020–21	Persian Gulf Pro League	22	1	3	1	—		—		25	2
Sepahan	2021–22	Persian Gulf Pro League	26	4	1	0	6	0	—		33	4
Sepahan	2025–26	Persian Gulf Pro League	0	0	1	0	1	0	—		2	0
Sepahan	Total		64	9	7	1	10	0	—		81	10
Persepolis	2022–23	Persian Gulf Pro League	29	6	4	4	—		—		33	10
Persepolis	2023–24	Persian Gulf Pro League	25	6	1	0	5	0	—		31	6
Persepolis	2024–25	Persian Gulf Pro League	27	2	1	0	7 (Note: Appearances in AFC Champions League Elite)	2	1 (Note: Appearance in Iranian Super Cup)	0	36	4
Persepolis	Total		81	14	6	4	12	2	1	0	100	20
Career total			268	35	30	6	38	3	4	0	340	44

=== International ===
As of match played on 8 June 2025

Appearances and goals by national team and year
National team	Year	Apps	Goals
Georgia	2015	0	0
Georgia	2023	0	0
Georgia	2024	8	0
Georgia	2025	2	0
Total		10	0

== Honours ==
Dinamo Tbilisi

- Umaglesi Liga: 2012–13, 2013–14, 2015–16
- Georgian Cup: 2012–13, 2013–14, 2014–15, 2015–16
- Georgian Super Cup: 2014, 2015

Persepolis

- Persian Gulf Pro League: 2022–23, 2023–24
- Hazfi Cup: 2022–23
- Iranian Super Cup: 2023
