= Lucas João =

Angolan footballer (born 1993)

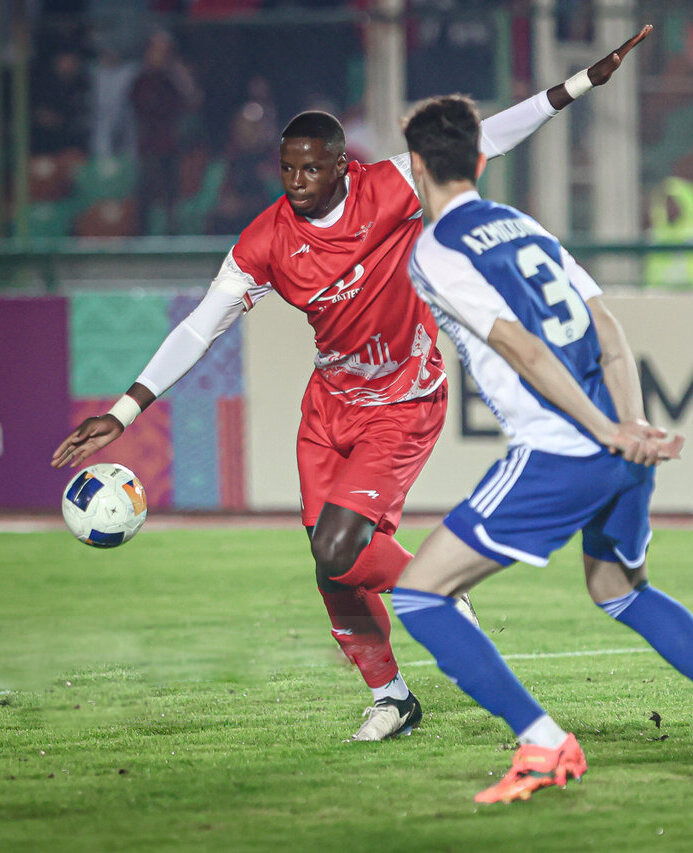
- Lucas João with Persepolis in 2024

Personal information
- Full name: Lucas Eduardo dos Santos João
- Date of birth: 4 September 1993 (age 33)
- Place of birth: Lisbon, Portugal
- Height: 1.92 m (6 ft 4 in)
- Position: Forward

Team information
- Current team: Petro Atlético
- Number: 9

Youth career
- 2007–2011: Beira Mar Almada
- 2011–2012: Nacional

Senior career*
Years	Team	Apps	(Gls)
2012–2015	Nacional	46	(6)
2012–2013	→ Mirandela (loan)	27	(12)
2015–2019	Sheffield Wednesday	112	(26)
2017	→ Blackburn Rovers (loan)	13	(3)
2019–2023	Reading	116	(42)
2023	Shanghai Port	9	(3)
2024	Umm Salal	10	(3)
2024–2025	Persepolis	7	(0)
2025	Ümraniyespor	9	(1)
2025–2026	Nacional	19	(0)
2026–	Petro Atlético		

International career^{‡}
2013	Portugal U20	2	(0)
2013	Portugal U21	3	(2)
2016	Portugal U23	1	(0)
2015	Portugal	2	(0)
2022–	Angola	5	(1)
- * Club domestic league appearances and goals as of 21:04, 18 May 2026 (UTC) ‡ National team caps and goals as of 18:48, 4 February 2025 (UTC)

Lucas Eduardo dos Santos João (born 4 September 1993), known as Lucas João, is a professional footballer who plays as a forward for Girabola club Petro Atlético and the Angola national team.

After starting out at Nacional, he went on to spend the vast majority of his career in the English Championship, with Sheffield Wednesday, Blackburn Rovers and Reading.

Lucas João made his full debut for Portugal in 2015, before changing his allegiance to Angola in 2022.

== Club career ==
=== Nacional ===
Born in Lisbon of Angolan descent, Lucas João started playing football with amateurs Beira Mar Atlético Clube Almada. In 2011 he signed with Nacional, where he spent his last year as a junior.

Lucas João made his senior debut with lowly Mirandela, on loan. He returned to the Madeirans for the 2013–14 season, making his Primeira Liga debut on 15 September 2013 against Arouca after coming on as a 78th-minute substitute, in a 0–1 home loss.

Lucas João scored his first goal(s) in the top flight on 11 January 2015, his brace helping to defeat Boavista 2–1 at home. He netted a further six – seven overall – during the campaign, as his team finished in seventh position.

=== Sheffield Wednesday ===
On 31 July 2015, Lucas João joined former teammate Marco Matias at English club Sheffield Wednesday, agreeing to a four-year contract for an undisclosed fee. He made his debut in the Football League Championship on 8 August, replacing Atdhe Nuhiu for the last 13 minutes of a 2–0 win against Bristol City. He scored his first goal three days later, in a 4–1 victory over Mansfield Town in the League Cup, also at Hillsborough.

Lucas João was one of three players on target on 27 October 2015 as Wednesday defeated Arsenal 3–0 at home to reach the fifth round of the League Cup. On 30 January 2017, he moved to fellow second-tier team Blackburn Rovers on loan until the end of the season.

=== Reading ===
Lucas João joined Reading on 6 August 2019, on a four-year deal for an undisclosed fee three days after scoring against them at the service of Sheffield Wednesday. The first goal for his new club came on his second Championship appearance, but in a 2–1 away loss to Hull City.

On 5 September 2020, Lucas João scored a hat-trick in a 3–1 win against Colchester United in the EFL Cup. He ended the league season as the fifth highest goalscorer with 19, as the Royals missed the playoffs by one place.

On 17 May 2023, after refusing to travel with the squad for their last away fixture of the campaign after relegation was confirmed, Reading announced that Lucas João would leave the Madejski Stadium at the end of his contract.

=== Later career ===
Lucas João signed for Chinese Super League club Shanghai Port on 28 July 2023. In February 2024, having been crowned champion, he moved to the Qatar Stars League with Umm Salal on a short-term contract.

On 9 September 2024, Lucas João joined Persian Gulf Pro League champions Persepolis on a one-year deal. The 31-year-old returned to Nacional in July 2025, signing a two-year contract from Turkey's Ümraniyespor one decade after leaving.

Lucas João moved to the Angolan Girabola with Petro Atlético on 27 June 2026.

== International career ==
=== Portugal ===
Lucas João won five caps for Portugal at youth level, including three for the under-21s. He was first called up to the full side on 6 November 2015, with manager Fernando Santos picking him ahead of friendlies against Russia and Luxembourg. He made his debut in the former match, featuring 18 minutes in the 1–0 loss in Krasnodar.

=== Angola ===
In March 2022, Lucas João was selected by Angola for friendlies with Guinea Bissau and Equatorial Guinea to be held later that month.

== Career statistics ==
=== Club ===
As of match played 11 May 2026

Club	Season	League			National cup (Note: Includes Taça de Portugal, FA Cup, Emir Cup, Hazfi Cup)		League cup (Note: Includes Taça da Liga, EFL Cup)		Continental		Other		Total	
Club	Season	Division	Apps	Goals	Apps	Goals	Apps	Goals	Apps	Goals	Apps	Goals	Apps	Goals
Nacional	2012–13	Primeira Liga	0	0	0	0	0	0	—		—		0	0
Nacional	2013–14	Primeira Liga	16	0	0	0	3	1	—		—		19	1
Nacional	2014–15	Primeira Liga	30	6	4	1	3	0	1 (Note: Appearance in UEFA Europa League)	0	—		38	7
Nacional	Total		46	6	4	1	6	1	1	0	—		57	8
Mirandela (loan)	2012–13	Segunda Divisão	27	12	1	0	—		—		—		28	12
Sheffield Wednesday	2015–16	Championship	40	6	2	0	4	2	—		2 (Note: Appearances in Championship play-offs)	0	48	8
Sheffield Wednesday	2016–17	Championship	10	0	1	0	1	1	—		—		12	1
Sheffield Wednesday	2017–18	Championship	30	9	3	0	1	0	—		—		34	9
Sheffield Wednesday	2018–19	Championship	31	10	1	0	0	0	—		—		32	10
Sheffield Wednesday	2019–20	Championship	1	1	0	0	0	0	—		—		1	1
Sheffield Wednesday	Total		112	26	7	0	6	3	—		2	0	127	29
Blackburn Rovers (loan)	2016–17	Championship	13	3	—		—		—		—		13	3
Reading	2019–20	Championship	19	6	0	0	0	0	—		—		19	6
Reading	2020–21	Championship	39	19	0	0	1	3	—		—		40	22
Reading	2021–22	Championship	24	10	0	0	0	0	—		—		24	10
Reading	2022–23	Championship	34	7	2	0	0	0	—		—		36	7
Reading	Total		116	42	2	0	1	3	—		—		119	45
Shanghai Port	2023	Chinese Super League	9	3	0	0	—		1 (Note: Appearance(s) in AFC Champions League Elite)	0	—		10	3
Umm Salal	2023–24	Qatar Stars League	10	3	2	2	0	0	—		—		12	5
Persepolis	2024–25	Persian Gulf Pro League	7	0	1	1	—		6	0	1 (Note: Appearance in Iranian Super Cup)	0	15	1
Ümraniyespor	2024–25	TFF 1. Lig	9	1	0	0	—		—		—		9	1
Nacional	2025–26	Primeira Liga	19	0	1	0	—		—		—		20	0
Career Total			368	96	18	4	13	7	8	0	3	0	410	107

=== International ===
As of match played 11 June 2024

National team	Year	Apps	Goals
Portugal	2015	2	0
Angola	2022	1	0
Angola	2023	3	1
Angola	2024	1	0
Total		7	1

Scores and results list Angola's goal tally first, score column indicates score after each Lucas João goal.

No.	Date	Venue	Opponent	Score	Result	Competition
1.	27 March 2023	Estádio 11 de Novembro, Luanda, Angola	Ghana	1–0	1–1	2023 Africa Cup of Nations qualification

== Honours ==
Shanghai Port

- Chinese Super League: 2023

Petro Atlético

- Supertaça de Angola: 2026

Individual

- EFL Championship Player of the Month: February 2022
