= Oston Urunov =

Uzbekistani footballer (born 2000)

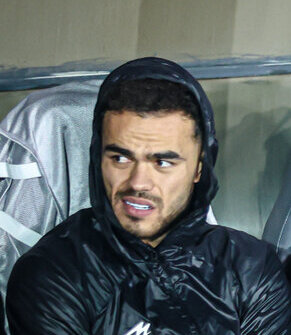
- Urunov with Persepolis in 2024

Personal information
- Full name: Oston Rustam oʻgʻli Urunov
- Date of birth: 19 December 2000 (age 25)
- Place of birth: Navoiy, Uzbekistan
- Height: 1.81 m (5 ft 11 in)
- Positions: Midfielder; winger

Team information
- Current team: Persepolis
- Number: 70

Youth career
- 2010–2011: Navoi
- 2011–2017: Pakhtakor

Senior career*
Years	Team	Apps	(Gls)
2017	Pakhtakor	0	(0)
2017	→ Navbahor Namangan (loan)	9	(1)
2018–2019	Navbahor Namangan	42	(2)
2019–2020	Lokomotiv Tashkent	13	(1)
2020	Ufa	10	(0)
2020–2022	Spartak Moscow	8	(0)
2021–2022	→ Ufa (loan)	24	(0)
2022	Ural Yekaterinburg	2	(0)
2023–2024	Navbahor Namangan	25	(9)
2024–	Persepolis	62	(14)

International career^{‡}
2018–2020	Uzbekistan U23	4	(0)
2024	Uzbekistan Olympic (O.P.)	3	(0)
2019–	Uzbekistan	46	(10)
Medal record
Representing Uzbekistan
CAFA Nations Cup
Runner-up	2023 Kyrgyzstan–Uzbekistan	Team
Winner	2025 Tajikistan–Uzbekistan	Team
- * Club domestic league appearances and goals as of 6 November 2026 ‡ National team caps and goals as of 28 June 2026

Oston Rustam oʻgʻli Urunov (born 19 December 2000) is an Uzbek professional footballer who plays as an attacking midfielder for Persian Gulf Pro League club Persepolis and the Uzbekistan national team.

== Club career ==
Oston Urunov played in Uzbekistan for Navbahor and PFC Lokomotiv Tashkent. In total, he played 55 matches in the Uzbekistan Super League.

On 10 February 2020, Urunov signed a long-term contract with Russian Premier League club Ufa. On 5 August 2020, Spartak Moscow announced the signing of Urunov to a long-term contract from Ufa. On 20 February 2021, he returned to Ufa on loan with an option to purchase.

Upon his return from loan at Ufa, he was moved by Spartak to their second squad in the Russian Football National League, FC Spartak-2 Moscow.

On 19 August 2021, he returned to Ufa on another season-long loan, with an option to purchase.

On 2 September 2022, Urunov's contract with Spartak was terminated by mutual consent. On the same day, Urunov signed with Ural Yekaterinburg. On 25 October 2022, Ural terminated the contract with Urunov by mutual consent.

=== Persepolis ===
On 7 February 2024, Urunov joined Persian Gulf Pro League champions Persepolis on a 18-month deal.

He scored his first goal for Persepolis in a 4–2 victory over Foolad on 8 March 2024.

== International career ==
Urunov made his international debut for Uzbekistan in a friendly 2–0 defeat to Turkey on 2 June 2019.

He scored his first international goal on 11 June 2022 against Maldives at the Namangan Markaziy Stadium during the 2023 AFC Asian Cup qualification.

On 2 June 2026, he was included in the 26-man squad selected by head coach Fabio Cannavaro for the 2026 FIFA World Cup, marking the country's first-ever appearance in the tournament.

== Career statistics ==
=== Club ===
As of match played 6 November 2026

Appearances and goals by club, season and competition
Club	Season	League			National cup (Note: Includes Uzbekistan Cup, Russian Cup, Hazfi Cup)		Continental		Other		Total	
Club	Season	Division	Apps	Goals	Apps	Goals	Apps	Goals	Apps	Goals	Apps	Goals
Pakhtakor Tashkent	2017	Uzbek League	0	0	0	0	—		—		0	0
Navbahor Namangan (loan)	2017	Uzbek League	9	1	0	0	—		—		9	1
Navbahor Namangan	2018	Uzbekistan Super League	30	0	0	0	—		—		30	0
Navbahor Namangan	2019	Uzbekistan Super League	12	2	0	0	—		—		12	2
Navbahor Namangan	Total		51	2	0	0	—		—		51	2
Lokomotiv Tashkent	2019	Uzbekistan Super League	13	1	1	0	—		—		14	1
Ufa	2019–20	Russian Premier League	10	0	0	0	—		—		10	0
Spartak Moscow	2020–21	Russian Premier League	8	0	1	1	—		—		9	1
Ufa (loan)	2020–21	Russian Premier League	8	0	2	0	—		—		10	0
Ufa (loan)	2021–22	Russian Premier League	16	0	0	0	—		1 (Note: Appearance in Russian Premier League relegation play-offs)	0	17	0
Ufa (loan)	Total		34	0	2	1	—		1	0	37	0
Ural Yekaterinburg	2022–23	Russian Premier League	2	0	1	0	—		—		3	0
Navbahor	2023	Uzbekistan Super League	25	9	5	2	5 (Note: Appearances in AFC Champions League)	3	—		35	14
Persepolis	2023–24	Persian Gulf Pro League	13	6	2	1	—		—		15	7
Persepolis	2024–25	Persian Gulf Pro League	20	4	0	0	4 (Note: Appearances in AFC Champions League Elite)	1	1 (Note: Appearance in Iranian Super Cup)	0	25	5
Persepolis	2025–26	Persian Gulf Pro League	20	3	1	0	—		—		21	3
Persepolis	2026–27	Persian Gulf Pro League	9	1	0	0	—		—		9	1
Persepolis	Total		62	14	3	1	4	1	1	0	70	16
Career total			195	26	13	4	9	4	1	0	218	34

=== International ===
As of match played 27 June 2026

Appearances and goals by national team and year
National team	Year	Apps	Goals
Uzbekistan
Uzbekistan	2019	4	0
Uzbekistan	2020	0	0
Uzbekistan	2021	1	0
Uzbekistan	2022	4	2
Uzbekistan	2023	12	3
Uzbekistan	2024	11	3
Uzbekistan	2025	8	2
Uzbekistan	2026	6	0
Total		46	10

As of match played 17 June 2026
Uzbekistan score listed first, score column indicates score after each Urunov goal

List of international goals scored by Oston Urunov
No.	Date	Venue	Cap	Opponent	Score	Result	Competition	Ref.
1	11 June 2022	Markaziy Stadium, Namangan, Uzbekistan	5	Maldives	4–0	4–0	2023 AFC Asian Cup qualification	
2	23 September 2022	Goyang Stadium, Goyang, South Korea	7	Cameroon	2–0	2–0	Friendly	
3	17 June 2023	Milliy Stadium, Tashkent, Uzbekistan	13	Tajikistan	5–1	5–1	2023 CAFA Nations Cup	
4	13 October 2023	Dalian Pro Academy Base Stadium, Dalian, China	17	Vietnam	1–0	2–0	Friendly	
5	21 November 2023	Milliy Stadium, Tashkent, Uzbekistan	20	Iran	1–2	2–2	2026 FIFA World Cup qualification	
6	26 March 2024	Milliy Stadium, Tashkent, Uzbekistan	26	Hong Kong	3–0	3–0	2026 FIFA World Cup qualification	
7	6 June 2024	Milliy Stadium, Tashkent, Uzbekistan	27	Turkmenistan	2–1	3–1	2026 FIFA World Cup qualification	
8	10 September 2024	Dolen Omurzakov Stadium, Bishkek, Kyrgyzstan	31	Kyrgyzstan	3–2	3–2	2026 FIFA World Cup qualification	
9	14 November 2025	Hazza bin Zayed Stadium, Al Ain, UAE	39	Egypt	1–0	2–0	2025 Al Ain International Cup	
10	14 November 2025	Hazza bin Zayed Stadium, Al Ain, UAE	39	Egypt	2–0	2–0	2025 Al Ain International Cup	

== Honours ==
Persepolis

- Persian Gulf Pro League: 2023–24
