= Javad Aghaeipour =

Iranian footballer (born 1999)

Personal information
- Date of birth: 6 December 1999 (age 26)
- Place of birth: Rasht, Iran
- Height: 1.81 m (5 ft 11 in)
- Position: Forward

Team information
- Current team: Nassaji Mazandaran
- Number: 9

Youth career
- Sepidrood

Senior career*
Years	Team	Apps	(Gls)
2017–2020	Sepidrood	31	(4)
2020–2021	Nassaji Mazandaran		
2021–2022	Shahrdari Astara	32	(4)
2022–2024	Esteghlal Khuzestan	49	(20)
2024–2026	Sepahan	29	(3)
2026	Aluminium Arak	5	(1)
2026–	Nassaji Mazandaran	12	(4)

International career^{‡}
2024–	Iran	1	(0)
- * Club domestic league appearances and goals as of 1 June 2024 ‡ National team caps and goals as of 6 June 2024

Javad Aghaeipour (Persian: جواد آقایی پور; born 6 December 1999) is an Iranian footballer who plays as a centre-forward for Nassaji Mazandaran and the Iran national team.

== International career ==
Aghaeipour made his debut for the Iran national team on 6 June 2024 in a World Cup qualifier against Hong Kong. He substituted Mehdi Taremi in added time as Iran won 4–2.

== Career statistics ==
=== International ===
As of match played 6 June 2024

Appearances and goals by national team and year
National team	Year	Apps	Goals
Iran	2024	1	0
Total		1	0
