= Alireza Kazemi (footballer) =

Iranian footballer

Personal information
- Date of birth: 27 May 1999 (age 27)
- Place of birth: Andimeshk, Iran
- Height: 1.83 m (6 ft 0 in)
- Position: Winger

Team information
- Current team: Zob Ahan
- Number: 77

Senior career*
Years	Team	Apps	(Gls)
2018–2019	Shahbaz Nozhan		
2019–2020	Setaregan Simorgh		
2020–2022	Shohadaye Razakan		
2022–2023	Khooshe Talaee	19	(6)
2023–2024	Esteghlal Khuzestan	27	(3)
2024–2026	Gol Gohar	16	(1)
2026–	Zob Ahan	9	(0)
- * Club domestic league appearances and goals as of 2 May 2025

Alireza Kazemi (Persian: علیرضا کاظمی; born 27 May 1999) is an Iranian footballer who plays as a winger for Persian Gulf Pro League side Zob Ahan.

== Club career ==
Kazemi joined Gol Gohar in 2024 and Mehdi Tartar confirmed him to be in the main team.
