= Mohammad Milad Sourgi =

Iranian football player

Mohammadmilad Soorgi
Personal information
- Full name: Mohammadmilad Soorgi
- Date of birth: 11 February 2002 (age 24)
- Place of birth: Birjand, Iran
- Position: Attacking midfielder

Team information
- Current team: Shams Azar
- Number: 48

Youth career
- 2022–2023: Persepolis

Senior career*
Years	Team	Apps	(Gls)
2023–2024	Persepolis	10	(0)
2024–	Shams Azar	51	(4)
- * Club domestic league appearances and goals as of 7 April 2024

Mohammadmilad Soorgi (Persian: محمدمیلاد سورگی ; born 11 February 2002) is an Iranian professional footballer who plays as an attacking midfielder for Persian Gulf Pro League club Shams Azar

== Club career ==
=== Persepolis ===
Mohammad Milad Sourgi In July 2022, he joined the Club Academy and was added to the Persepolisin the 2023–24 season.

Mohammad Milad Sourgi's first game was against the Tractor football team in week 2 of the Persian Gulf Pro League and he entered the field in the last 5 minutes of the game.

== Career statistics ==
As of 26 April 2024

Club	Division	Season	League		Hazfi Cup		Asia		Other		Total	
Club	Division	Season	Apps	Goals	Apps	Goals	Apps	Goals	Apps	Goals	Apps	Goals
Persepolis	Pro League	2023–24	10	0	1	0	5	0	0	0	16	0
Persepolis	Total		10	0	1	0	5	0	0	0	16	0
Career totals			10	0	1	0	5	0	0	0	16	0
