= Saeid Sadeghi =

Iranian footballer (born 1994)

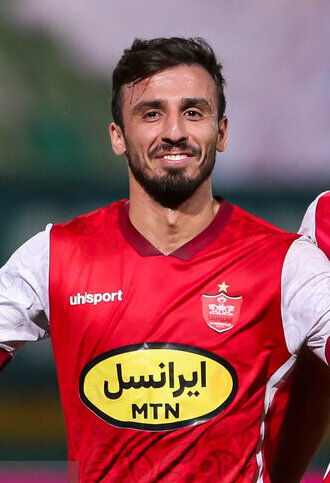
- Sadeghi with Persepolis in September 2022

Personal information
- Date of birth: April 25, 1994 (age 32)
- Place of birth: Sari, Iran
- Height: 1.80 m (5 ft 11 in)
- Position: Winger

Team information
- Current team: Aluminium Arak
- Number: 21

Youth career
- Sanat Sari

Senior career*
Years	Team	Apps	(Gls)
2012–2013	Saba Qom	4	(0)
2013–2015	Niroye Zamini	31	(6)
2015–2016	Mes Kerman	30	(2)
2016–2017	Khoneh Be Khoneh	29	(0)
2017	Paykan	4	(0)
2018–2020	Shahr Khodro	65	(5)
2020–2022	Gol Gohar	58	(12)
2022–2025	Persepolis	59	(8)
2025–2026	Foolad	4	(0)
2026–	Aluminium Arak	11	(0)
- * Club domestic league appearances and goals as of 31 January 2025

Saeid Sadeghi (Persian: سعید صادقی, born April 25, 1994) is an Iranian professional footballer who plays as a winger for Persian Gulf Pro League club Aluminium Arak.

== Club career ==
=== Persepolis ===
On 25 June 2022, Sadeghi joined Persian Gulf Pro League side Persepolis on a one-year deal.

== Club career statistics ==
As of 31 January 2025

Club	Division	Season	League		Hazfi Cup		Asia		Other		Total	
Club	Division	Season	Apps	Goals	Apps	Goals	Apps	Goals	Apps	Goals	Apps	Goals
Saba Qom	Pro League	2012–13	4	0	0	0	—		—		4	0
Saba Qom	Total		4	0	0	0	—		—		4	0
Nirooye Zamini	Azadegan League	2013–14	7	0	0	0	—		—		7	0
Nirooye Zamini	Azadegan League	2014–15	24	6	1	0	—		—		25	6
Nirooye Zamini	Total		31	6	1	0	—		—		32	6
Mes Kerman	Azadegan League	2015–16	30	2	3	2	—		—		34	4
Mes Kerman	Total		30	2	3	2	—		—		33	4
Khoneh Be Khoneh	Azadegan League	2016–17	29	0	3	1	—		—		32	1
Khoneh Be Khoneh	Total		29	0	3	1	—		—		32	1
Paykan	Pro League	2017–18	4	0	0	0	—		—		4	0
Paykan	Total		4	0	0	0	—		—		4	0
Shahr Khodro	Pro League	2017–18	10	0	0	0	—		—		10	0
Shahr Khodro	Pro League	2018–19	27	0	1	0	—		—		28	0
Shahr Khodro	Pro League	2019–20	28	5	2	0	6	0	—		34	5
Shahr Khodro	Total		65	5	3	0	6	0	—		74	5
Gol Gohar	Pro League	2020–21	28	5	4	0	—		—		32	3
Gol Gohar	Pro League	2021–22	30	7	2	0	—		—		32	7
Gol Gohar	Total		58	12	6	0	—		—		64	10
Persepolis	Pro League	2022–23	24	6	3	0	—		—		27	6
Persepolis	Pro League	2023–24	26	1	1	0	6	2	—		33	3
Persepolis	Pro League	2024–25	9	1	1	0	4	0	0	0	14	1
Persepolis	Total		59	8	5	0	10	2	0	0	74	10
Foolad	Pro League	2025–26	0	0	0	0	—		—		0	0
Foolad	Total		0	0	0	0	0	0	0	0	0	0
Career Total			280	33	21	3	16	2	0	0	317	36

== Honours ==
Persepolis

- Persian Gulf Pro League: (2) 2022–23, 2023–24
- Hazfi Cup: 2022–23
- Iranian Super Cup: 2023
