= Imam Khomeini Stadium =

Sports stadium in Arak, Iran

Imam Khomeini
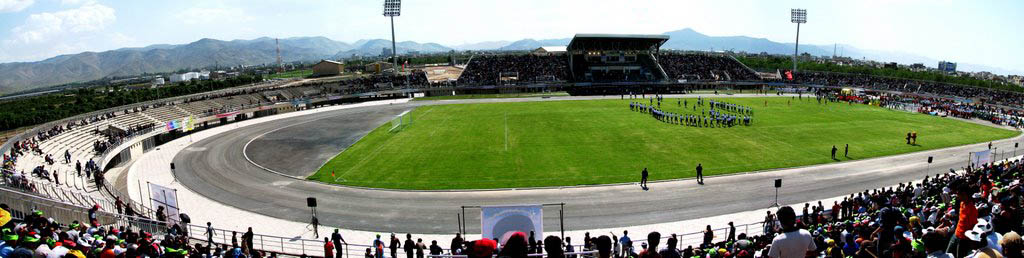
- Full name: Imam Khomeini Stadium
- Location: Arak, Iran
- Owner: Iran Physical Education Organization
- Operator: Aluminium Arak; Shahrdari Arak
- Capacity: 15,000
- Surface: Grass
- Field size: 105 × 68 m

Construction
- Groundbreaking: 2007
- Opened: 2007

Tenants
- Aluminium Arak (2007–present); Shahrdari Arak (2015–present)

The Imam Khomeini Stadium (Persian: ورزشگاه امام خمینی, Vârzeshgah-e Emam-e Xemini) is a multi-use stadium in Arak, Markazi, Iran, with a 15,000 seating capacity. The stadium was opened in 2007 and is owned by the Iran Physical Education Organization. It is the home stadium of Aluminium Arak and Shahrdari Arak.
