= Abolfazl Babaei Yekta =

Iranian football player (born 2003)

Abolfazl Babaei
Personal information
- Full name: Abolfazl Babaei Yekta
- Date of birth: 22 October 2003 (age 23)
- Place of birth: Iran
- Position: Striker

Team information
- Current team: Persepolis
- Number: 18

Youth career
- 2018–2020: Moghavemat Tehran
- 2020–2021: Baadraan

Senior career*
Years	Team	Apps	(Gls)
2021	Baadraan	1	(1)
2021–2024	Fajr Sepasi	43	(6)
2024–2026	Persepolis	10	(0)
- * Club domestic league appearances and goals as of 18 April 2025

Abolfazl Babaei (Persian: ابوالفضل بابایی; born 22 October 2003) is an Iranian professional footballer who plays as a striker for Persian Gulf Pro League club Persepolis.

== Club career ==
=== Baadraan ===
In the 2021 season, Babaei joined Azadegan League side Baadraan.

=== Fajr Sepasi ===
In the 2021–222 season, Babaei joined Azadegan League side Fajr Sepasi. He played in 43 matches for Fajr Sepasi.

=== Persepolis ===
On 7 February 2024, Babaei joined Persian Gulf Pro League side Persepolis on a two-year deal.

Abolfazl Babaei's first game was against the Naft va Gaz football team in of the Iranian Hazfi Cup and he entered the field in the last 13 minutes of the game.

== Career statistics ==
As of 22 April 2025

Club	Division	Season	League		Hazfi Cup		Asia		Other		Total	
Club	Division	Season	Apps	Goals	Apps	Goals	Apps	Goals	Apps	Goals	Apps	Goals
Persepolis	Pro League	2023–24	3	0	1	0	0	0	0	0	4	0
Persepolis	Pro League	2024–25	7	0	0	0	0	0	0	0	7	0
Persepolis	Pro League	2025–26	0	0	0	0	—		—		0	0
Persepolis	Total		10	0	1	0	0	0	0	0	11	0
