= Mohammad Khodabandelou =

Iranian footballer

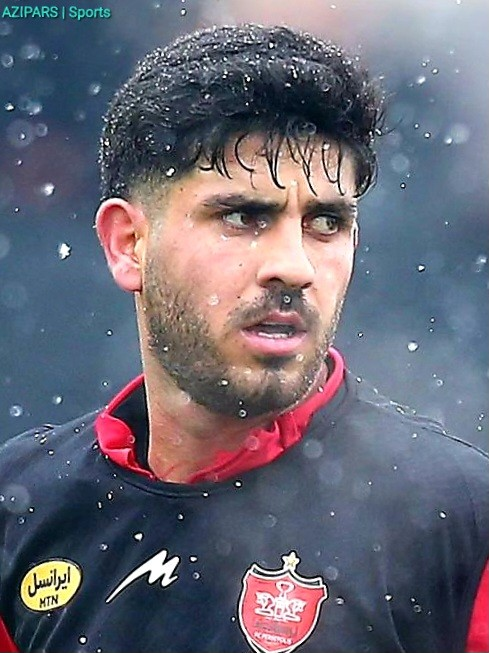
- Khodabandelou in Persepolis training in 2024

Personal information
- Full name: Mohammad Khodabandelou
- Date of birth: 7 September 1999 (age 27)
- Place of birth: Tehran, Iran
- Height: 1.80 m (5 ft 11 in)
- Position: Midfielder

Team information
- Current team: Persepolis
- Number: 77

Youth career
- 2014–2017: Paykan

Senior career*
Years	Team	Apps	(Gls)
2017–2021	Paykan	47	(2)
2021–2022	Zob Ahan	27	(2)
2022–2023	Gol Gohar	28	(3)
2023–2024	Mes Rafsanjan	15	(1)
2024–	Persepolis	61	(2)

International career^{‡}
2018–2023	Iran U23	20	(0)
2025	Iran	1	(0)
Medal record
Representing Iran
CAFA Nations Cup
Runner-up	2025 Tajikistan–Uzbekistan	Team
- * Club domestic league appearances and goals as of 20 November 2026 ‡ National team caps and goals as of 29 August 2025

Mohammad Khodabandelou (Persian: محمد خدابنده‌لو; born 7 September 1999) is an Iranian footballer who plays as a midfielder for Persian Gulf Pro League club Persepolis and the Iran national team.

== Honours ==
Persepolis

- Persian Gulf Pro League (1): 2023–24

== Club career ==
=== Paykan ===
He was able to show his football quality in the academy of the Paykan football team and was later called by Hossein Faraki for the main team, but later the peak of his football was where he was included in the main team by Mehdi Tartar and attracted attentions.

=== Mes Rafsanjan ===
On 28 June 2023, He joined Persian Gulf Pro League side Mes Rafsanjan. He was one of the team key players and helped Mes in 15 league matches.

=== Persepolis ===
On 24 February 2024, Khodabandelou signed a 2.5-year contract with Persian Gulf Pro League champions Persepolis.

== Career statistics ==
=== Club ===
As of 20 November 2026.

Club	Season	League			Cup		Continental		Other		Total	
Club	Season	Division	Apps	Goals	Apps	Goals	Apps	Goals	Apps	Goals	Apps	Goals
Paykan	2017–18	Pro League	5	0	0	0	—		—		5	0
Paykan	2018–19	Pro League	4	0	0	0	—		—		4	0
Paykan	2019–20	Pro League	16	0	1	0	—		—		17	0
Paykan	2020–21	Pro League	22	2	1	0	—		—		23	2
Paykan	Total		47	2	2	0	—		—		49	2
Zob Ahan	2021–22	Pro League	27	2	2	1	—		—		29	3
Zob Ahan	Total		27	2	2	1	—		—		29	3
Gol Gohar	2022–23	Pro League	28	3	2	0	—		—		30	3
Gol Gohar	Total		28	3	2	0	—		—		30	3
Mes Rafsanjan	2023–24	Pro League	15	1	0	0	—		—		15	1
Mes Rafsanjan	Total		15	1	0	0	—		—		15	1
Persepolis	2023–24	Pro League	12	0	2	0	—		—		14	0
Persepolis	2024–25	Pro League	21	1	2	0	6	0	1	0	30	1
Persepolis	2025–26	Pro League	17	0	1	0	—		1	0	19	0
Persepolis	2026–27	Pro League	11	1	0	0	—		—		11	1
Persepolis	Total		61	2	5	0	6	0	2	0	74	2
Career total			178	10	11	1	6	0	2	0	197	11

== International career ==
He made his Debut against Afghanistan on 29 August 2025 in CAFA Championship.

=== International ===
As of match played 29 August 2025

Appearances and goals by national team and year
National team	Year	Apps	Goals
Iran
Iran	2025	1	0
Total		1	0
