= Jorcey Anísio =

Brazilian footballer (born 1972)

Personal information
- Full name: Jorcey Anísio Garcia Santos
- Date of birth: October 24, 1972 (age 54)
- Place of birth: Rio de Janeiro, Brazil
- Height: 1.91 m (6 ft 3 in)
- Position: Goalkeeper

Team information
- Current team: Persepolis F.C.

Youth career
- Flamengo

Senior career*
Years	Team	Apps	(Gls)
1992–1995	Flamengo		
1992–1993	→ Desportiva (loan)		
1994	→ Olaria (loan)		
1995–1996	Boavista F.C.		
1996–1997	União da Madeira		
1998–2000	CFZ-RJ		
2000	Londrina		
2000	União Barbarense		
2001–2002	Juventus-SP		
2002	CFZ-DF		

International career
1988–1989	Brazil U17		

Managerial career
- 2003–2007: Olaria (goalkeepers trainer)
- 2007–2011: CFZ-DF (goalkeepers trainer)
- 2010–2011: Al Shabab FC (Riyadh) (goalkeepers trainer)
- 2010–2011: Saudi Arabia (goalkeepers trainer)
- 2011–2012: Avaí (goalkeepers trainer)
- 2013: São Cristóvão (goalkeepers trainer)
- 2015: Botafogo (goalkeepers trainer)
- 2021–2024: Sport Recife (goalkeepers trainer)
- 2024–: Persepolis (goalkeepers trainer)
- * Club domestic league appearances and goals as of 13 March 2024

Jorcey Anísio Garcia Santos (born 24 October 1972, Rio de Janeiro) is a Brazilian former football player, who played as a goalkeeper, and currently a goalkeeper trainer for Persepolis.

== Playing career ==
Jorcey played for the Brazil national under-17 football team in 1988 and 1989.

== Honours ==
Desportiva

- Campeonato Capixaba: 1992
