= Farshad Faraji =

Iranian footballer

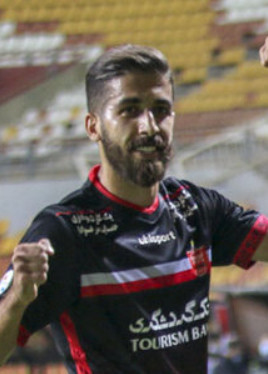
- Faraji with Persepolis in 2021

Personal information
- Full name: Farshad Faraji Khonakdari
- Date of birth: 7 April 1994 (age 32)
- Place of birth: Qaem Shahr, Iran
- Height: 1.80 m (5 ft 11 in)
- Positions: Centre-back; right-back

Team information
- Current team: Tractor
- Number: 33

Youth career
- –2014: Persepolis QaemShahr
- 2014–2015: Rah Ahan

Senior career*
Years	Team	Apps	(Gls)
2014–2016	Rah Ahan	26	(2)
2016–2017	Sanat Naft	13	(0)
2017	Saipa	11	(0)
2017–2018	Khooneh be Khooneh	27	(1)
2018–2019	Nassaji Mazandaran	26	(1)
2019–2021	Shahr Khodrou	42	(2)
2021–2025	Persepolis	87	(2)
2025–	Tractor	3	(0)
- * Club domestic league appearances and goals as of 8 May 2025

Farshad Faraji (Persian: فرشاد فرجی; born 7 April 1994) is an Iranian professional footballer who plays as Centr-back for Persian Gulf Pro League club Tractor and Iran national team.

== Club career ==
=== Rah Ahan ===
Faraji joined Rah Ahan in summer 2014 with a contract until 2017. He made his professional debut for Rah Ahan on 30 January 2015, in 2–0 loss against Foolad as a substitute for Mohsen Mirabi.

=== Persepolis ===
On 15 March 2021, Faraji signed a 2.5-year contract with Persian Gulf Pro League champions Persepolis.

== Career statistics ==
As of 8 May 2025

Club	Division	Season	League		Hazfi Cup		Asia		Other		Total	
Club	Division	Season	Apps	Goals	Apps	Goals	Apps	Goals	Apps	Goals	Apps	Goals
Rah Ahan	Pro League	2014–15	1	0	0	0	—		_		1	0
Rah Ahan	Pro League	2015–16	25	2	2	0	—		_		27	2
Rah Ahan	Total		26	2	2	0	—		_		28	2
Sanat Naft	Pro League	2016–17	13	0	1	0	—		_		14	0
Sanat Naft	Total		13	0	1	0	—		_		14	0
Saipa	Pro League	2016–17	11	0	0	0	—		_		11	0
Saipa	Total		11	0	0	0	—		_		11	0
Khooneh be Khooneh	Azadegan League	2017–18	27	1	5	0	—		_		32	1
Khooneh be Khooneh	Total		27	1	5	0	—		_		32	1
Nassaji	Pro League	2018–19	26	1	2	0	—		_		28	1
Nassaji	Total		26	1	2	0	—		_		28	1
Shahr Khodrou	Pro League	2019–20	27	2	3	0	4	0	_		34	2
Shahr Khodrou	Pro League	2020–21	15	0	2	0	4	0	_		21	0
Shahr Khodrou	Total		42	2	5	0	8	0	_		55	2
Persepolis	Pro League	2020–21	8	0	2	0	1	0	0	0	11	0
Persepolis	Pro League	2021–22	23	1	3	0	2	0	1	0	29	1
Persepolis	Pro League	2022–23	18	0	3	0	—		0	0	21	0
Persepolis	Pro League	2023–24	16	0	2	0	0	0	0	0	18	0
Persepolis	Pro League	2024–25	22	1	2	0	5	2	1	0	30	3
Persepolis	Total		87	2	12	0	8	2	2	0	109	4
Career totals			232	8	27	0	16	2	2	0	277	10

== Honours ==
Persepolis

- Persian Gulf Pro League (3): 2020–21, 2022–23, 2023–24
- Hazfi Cup (1): 2022–23
- Iranian Super Cup (2): 2020, 2023

Tractor

- Iranian Super Cup: 2025
