= Mahmoud Motlaghzadeh =

Iranian footballer

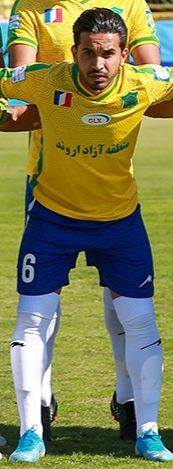

Personal information
- Date of birth: 11 May 1994 (age 32)
- Place of birth: Ahvaz, Iran
- Height: 1.74 m (5 ft 9 in)
- Position: Midfielder

Team information
- Current team: Aluminium Arak
- Number: 6

Youth career
- 2009–2015: Foolad

Senior career*
Years	Team	Apps	(Gls)
2015–2017	Foolad	41	(1)
2017	Gol Reyhan	3	(1)
2017–2018	Mes Kerman	12	(1)
2018–2019	Khooneh Be Khooneh	26	(4)
2019–2022	Sanat Naft	55	(5)
2022–2023	Malavan	26	(0)
2023–2025	Esteghlal Khuzestan	51	(4)
2025–2026	Fajr Sepasi	21	(1)
2026–	Aluminium Arak	10	(0)
- * Club domestic league appearances and goals as of 21 September 2024 @ 09:21(AEST)

Mahmoud Motlaghzadeh (Persian: محمود مطلق‌زاده; born 11 May 1994) is an Iranian football midfielder who plays for Aluminium Arak in the Persian Gulf Pro League.

== Club career ==
=== Foolad ===
He started his career with Foolad from youth levels. In summer 2015 he joined to the first team by Dragan Skočić and signed a three-year contract which kept him at Foolad until 2018. He made his debut for Foolad in fixture XI of the 2015–16 Iran Pro League against Malavan as a substitute for Esmaeil Sharifat.

== Club career statistics ==
As of 31 October 2015

Club	Division	Season	League		Hazfi Cup		Asia		Total	
Club	Division	Season	Apps	Goals	Apps	Goals	Apps	Goals	Apps	Goals
Foolad	Pro League	2015–16	1	0	0	0	–	–	1	0
Career Totals			1	0	0	0	0	0	1	0
