= Amirreza Rafiei =

Iranian footballer

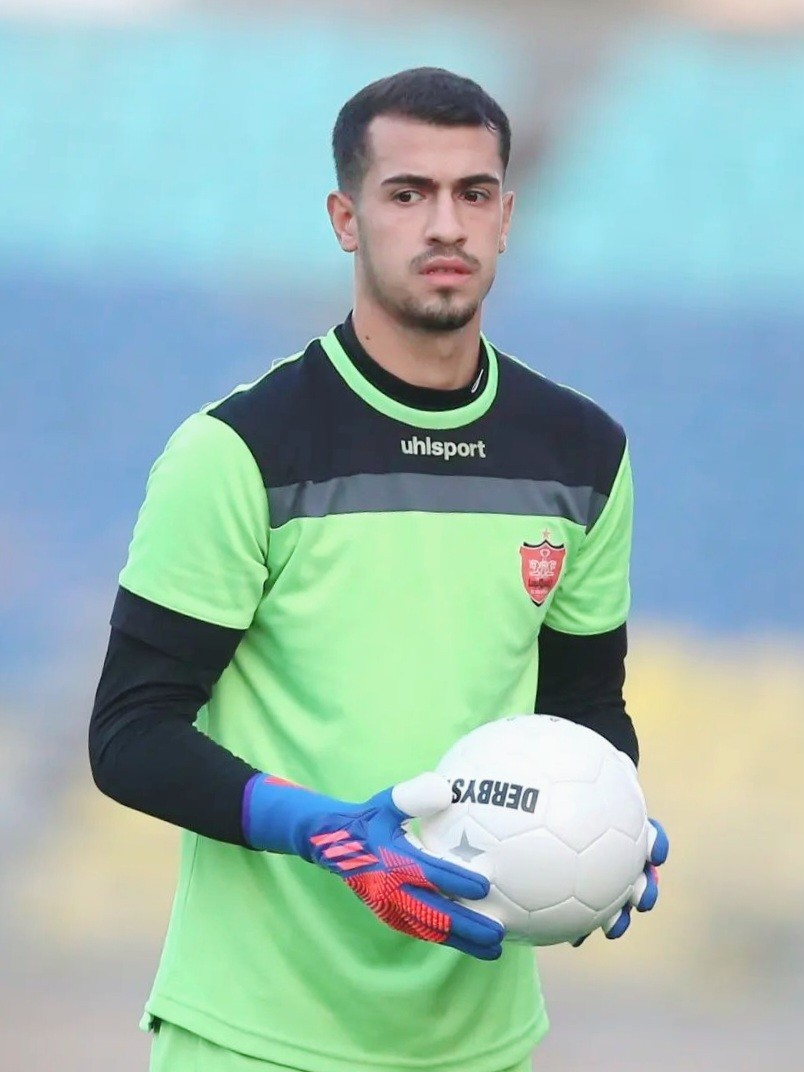

Personal information
- Date of birth: 11 April 2002 (age 24)
- Place of birth: Tehran, Iran
- Height: 1.89 m (6 ft 2 in)
- Position: Goalkeeper

Team information
- Current team: Persepolis
- Number: 22

Youth career
- 2020–2021: Saipa

Senior career*
Years	Team	Apps	(Gls)
2021–2022	Nassaji	0	(0)
2022–	Persepolis	9	(0)
- * Club domestic league appearances and goals as of 18 August 2025 ‡ National team caps and goals as of 24 December 2021

Amirreza Rafiei (Persian: امیر رضا رفیعی; born 11 April 2002) is an Iranian footballer who plays as a goalkeeper for Persepolis in the Persian Gulf Pro League.

== Club career ==
=== Persepolis ===
Rafiei joined Persepolis in 2022 and Yahya Golmohammadi confirmed him to be in the main team.

== Career statistics ==
As of 26 June 2026

Club	Division	Season	League		Cup		Asia		Other		Total	
Club	Division	Season	Apps	Goals	Apps	Goals	Apps	Goals	Apps	Goals	Apps	Goals
Persepolis	Pro League	2023–24	4	0	1	0	0	0	—		5	0
Persepolis	Pro League	2024–25	4	0	1	0	0	0	0	0	5	0
Persepolis	Pro League	2025–26	1	0	0	0	—		1	0	2	0
Persepolis	Total		9	0	2	0	0	0	1	0	12	0
Career totals			9	0	2	0	0	0	1	0	12	0
