= Alireza Khodadadi =

Iranian footballer (born 2002)

Personal information
- Date of birth: 20 October 2002 (age 24)
- Place of birth: babol, Iran
- Height: 1.83 m (6 ft 0 in)
- Position: Forward

Youth career
- 2022–2023: Persepolis B

Senior career*
Years	Team	Apps	(Gls)
2022–2025	Persepolis	2	(0)
2025–2026	Paykan	4	(1)
- * Club domestic league appearances and goals as of 21 January 2025

Alireza Khodadadi (Persian: علیرضا خدادادی; born 20 October 2002) is an Iranian professional footballer who plays as a forward for Persian Gulf Pro League club Paykan

== Career ==
=== Persepolis ===
Alireza Khodadadi In July 2022, he joined the Club Academy and was added to the Persepolis|.

Alireza Babaei's first game was against the Gol Gohar football team in of the Persian Gulf Pro League and he entered the field in the last 7 minutes of the game.

== Career statistics ==
As of 21 January 2025

Club	Division	Season	League		Hazfi Cup		Asia		Other		Total	
Club	Division	Season	Apps	Goals	Apps	Goals	Apps	Goals	Apps	Goals	Apps	Goals
Persepolis	Pro League	2022–23	1	0	0	0	0	0	0	0	1	0
Persepolis	Pro League	2023–24	0	0	0	0	0	0	0	0	0	0
Persepolis	Pro League	2024–25	1	0	0	0	0	0	0	0	1	0
Total			2	0	0	0	0	0	0	0	2	0

== Honours ==
Persepolis

- Persian Gulf Pro League: 2022–23
- Hazfi Cup: 2022–23
- Iranian Super Cup: 2023
