= Aref Haji Eydi =

Iranian footballer

Personal information
- Date of birth: 6 April 1999 (age 27)
- Place of birth: Bandar-e Gaz, Iran
- Height: 1.86 m (6 ft 1 in)
- Position: Defensive midfielder

Team information
- Current team: Sepahan
- Number: 6

Youth career
- 2018–: Saipa

Senior career*
Years	Team	Apps	(Gls)
2019–2023	Saipa	54	(6)
2022	→ Rayka Babol (loan)	13	(1)
2023–2025	Aluminium Arak	56	(8)
2025–	Sepahan	29	(0)

International career^{‡}
2026–	Iran	1	(0)
- * Club domestic league appearances and goals as of 6 September 2026 ‡ National team caps and goals as of 29 September 2026

Aref Haji Eydi (Persian: عارف حاجی‌عیدی; born 6 April 1999) is an Iranian footballer who plays as a defender for Persian Gulf Pro League club Sepahan and the Iran national team.

== Club career ==
=== Saipa ===
He made his debut for Saipa in 7th fixtures of 2019–20 Iran Pro League against Esteghlal.

== International Career ==
He made his debut on 29th September 2026 against Russia in a Friendly.

=== International ===
As of match played 29 September 2026

Appearances and goals by national team and year
National team	Year	Apps	Goals
Iran
Iran	2026	1	0
Total		1	0
