= Reza Darvish =

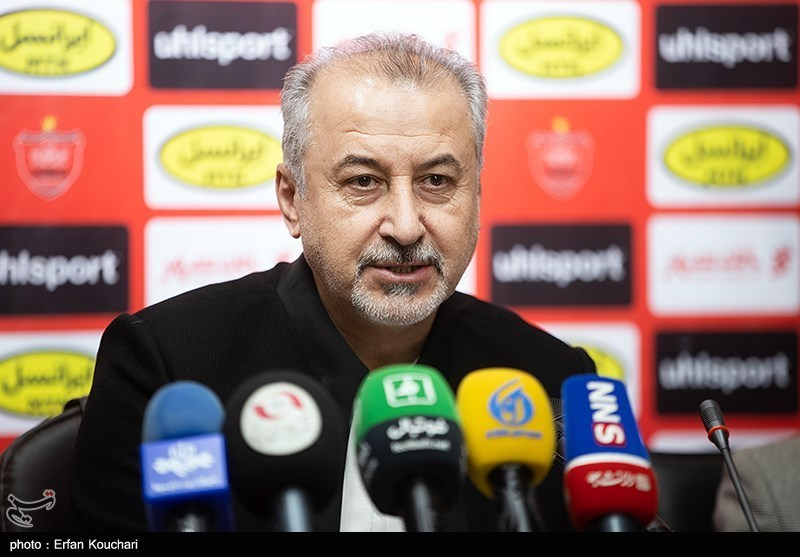
- Born: 14 July 1961 (age 64); Tehran, Iran
- Occupation: Sport management

Reza Darvish (Persian: رضا درویش) is an Iranian sports manager. He was the manager of Persepolis Football Club and was formerly involved with the Saipa Football Club.

== Executive background ==
- Management of Persepolis Football Club

== Management of Persepolis ==
On January 13, 2022, Reza Darvish, after being selected as the Manager of Persepolis Club, announced in an interview with a Fars News Agency reporter:

"Our goal and that of all Persepolisians is to join hands to somehow solve the club's problems."

He added:

"My most important goal is the vitality of the team and the fans."

=== Margins ===
His selection as the manager of Persepolis Club provoked criticism from the Iranian sports media and some Persepolis veterans. In an example, Hossein Kalani told Mehr News Agency:

"I think his dependence on Mr. Sajjadi (Minister of Sports) led him to reach a very large and important club football seat in the country"

He also added that:

Persepolis has fallen from "pit" to "well".

At a time when the Persepolis club needed to build infrastructure and professional organization and strengthen the senior team, ISNA wrote about the selection of Darwish as the manager of Persepolis:

"There is a good relationship between him and some of the club's veterans"

This was later considered an irrelevant advantage to professional club management issues.

Shortly after his selection as manager of Persepolis, he openly announced his desire to recruit "only" a free agent; During this period, quality players were not free, and such a statement by him was criticized by the sports media. His announcement came as Iranian rivals of Persepolis, like Esteghlal, bought national team players under contracts from other teams. He also used the condition of "possibility of recruitment" to hire the players and stated that he is not responsible for talking to the players.
