= Alireza Enayatzadeh =

Iranian footballer (born 2004)

Personal information
- Full name: Alireza Enayatzadeh Bora
- Date of birth: 5 April 2004 (age 22)
- Place of birth: Babol, Iran
- Height: 1.88 m (6 ft 2 in)
- Position: Defensive midfielder

Team information
- Current team: Mes Shahr-e Babak (on loan from Persepolis)
- Number: 5

Youth career
- 2014–2016: Kia Academy
- 2016–2019: Persepolis

Senior career*
Years	Team	Apps	(Gls)
2023–	Persepolis	10	(1)
2026–	→ Mes Shahr-e Babak (loan)	8	(0)

International career
2022–2023	Iran U-20	4	(1)
2023–2024	Iran U-23	3	(0)
- * Club domestic league appearances and goals as of 23 January 2026

Alireza Enayatzadeh (Persian: علیرضا عنایت‌زاده; born 5 April 2004) is an Iranian professional footballer who plays as a defensive midfielder for Mes Shahr-e Babak in the Persian Gulf Pro League, on loan from Persepolis.

He began his football career at Kia Academy before joining the Persepolis Academy. He made his debut for Persepolis' senior team on 23 February 2025 against Aluminium Arak, coming on as a substitute.

On 17 August 2026, Enayatzadeh joined Mes Shahr-e Babak on a season-long loan.

== Career statistics ==
As of 26 June 2026

Appearances and goals by club, season and competition
Club	Season	League			Hazfi Cup		Asia		Other		Total	
Club	Season	Division	Apps	Goals	Apps	Goals	Apps	Goals	Apps	Goals	Apps	Goals
Persepolis	2024–25	Persian Gulf Pro League	7	1	0	0	0	0	0	0	7	1
Persepolis	2025–26	Persian Gulf Pro League	3	0	0	0	–		1	0	4	0
Career total			10	1	0	0	0	0	1	0	11	1
