= Masoud Rigi =

Iranian footballer

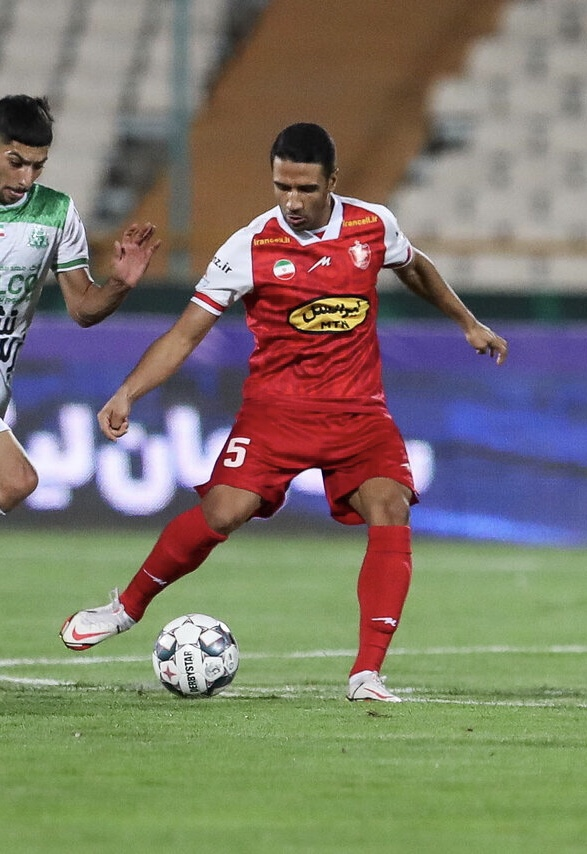
- Rigi playing for Persepolis in 2023

Personal information
- Date of birth: February 22, 1991 (age 35)
- Place of birth: Shiraz, Iran
- Height: 1.75 m (5 ft 9 in)
- Position: Defensive midfielder

Team information
- Current team: Fajr Sepasi
- Number: 6

Youth career
- 2008–2010: Fajr Sepasi

Senior career*
Years	Team	Apps	(Gls)
2011–	Fajr Sepasi	104	(2)
2016–2018	Baadraan Tehran	58	(7)
2018–2019	Padideh	30	(1)
2019–2021	Esteghlal	52	(1)
2021–2023	Sepahan	51	(1)
2023–2025	Persepolis	46	(1)
2025–	Fajr Sepasi	33	(1)

International career
2010–2013	Iran U23	1	(0)
- * Club domestic league appearances and goals as of 27 February 2026

Masoud Rigi is an Iranian professional footballer who plays as a defensive midfielder for Persian Gulf Pro League club Fajr Sepasi.

He started his career at Fajr Sepasi in 2008.

== Club career ==
=== Fajr Sepasi ===
Rigi started his career at Fajr Sepasi in 2008 and played for the main team from 2011.

=== Sepahan ===
On 28 August 2021, Rigi signed a two-year contract with Persian Gulf Pro League side Sepahan.

=== Persepolis ===
On 6 July 2023, Rigi signed a two-year contract with Persian Gulf Pro League champions Persepolis.

== Club career statistics ==
As of 27 February 2026

Club performance			League		Cup		Continental		Total	
Season	Club	League	Apps	Goals	Apps	Goals	Apps	Goals	Apps	Goals
Iran			League		Hazfi Cup		Asia		Total	
2011–12	Fajr Sepasi	Persian Gulf Pro League	3	0	2	0	–	–	5	0
2012–13	Fajr Sepasi	Persian Gulf Pro League	7	0	1	0	–	–	8	0
2013–14	Fajr Sepasi	Persian Gulf Pro League	19	1	1	0	–	–	20	1
2014–15	Fajr Sepasi	Division 1	18	0	0	0	–	–	18	0
2015–16	Fajr Sepasi	Division 1	34	1	0	0	–	–	34	1
Total			81	2	4	0	0	0	85	2
2016–17	Baadraan Tehran	Azadegan League	26	3	0	0	–	–	26	3
2017–18	Baadraan Tehran	Azadegan League	32	4	3	1	–	–	35	5
Total			58	7	3	1	0	0	61	8
2018–19	Padideh	Pro League	30	1	2	0	–	–	32	1
2019–20	Esteghlal	Persian Gulf Pro League	26	1	5	0	7	0	38	1
2020–21	Esteghlal	Persian Gulf Pro League	26	0	5	0	6	0	37	0
Total			52	1	10	0	13	0	75	1
2021–22	Sepahan	Persian Gulf Pro League	23	0	1	0	3	0	27	0
2022–23	Sepahan	Persian Gulf Pro League	28	1	2	0	0	0	30	1
Total			51	1	3	0	3	0	57	1
2023–24	Perspolis	Persian Gulf Pro League	30	1	2	0	6	0	38	1
2024–25	Perspolis	Persian Gulf Pro League	16	0	2	1	8	0	26	1
Total			46	1	4	1	14	0	64	2
2025–26	Fajr Sepasi	Persian Gulf Pro League	23	0	1	0	–	–	24	0
Career total			341	13	27	2	30	0	398	15

== International ==
In 2012, Rigi was called up by Carlos Queiroz to participate in an Iran national under-23 football team training camp in preparation for the Asian Cup world qualifiers beginning in June of that year.

== Honours ==
=== Club ===
Esteghlal Tehran

- Persian Gulf Pro League runner-up: 2019–20
- Hazfi Cup runner-up (2): 2020, 2021

Sepahan

- Persian Gulf Pro League runner-up: 2022–23

Persepolis

- Persian Gulf Pro League (1): 2023–24
