= Ali Nemati =

Iranian association football player

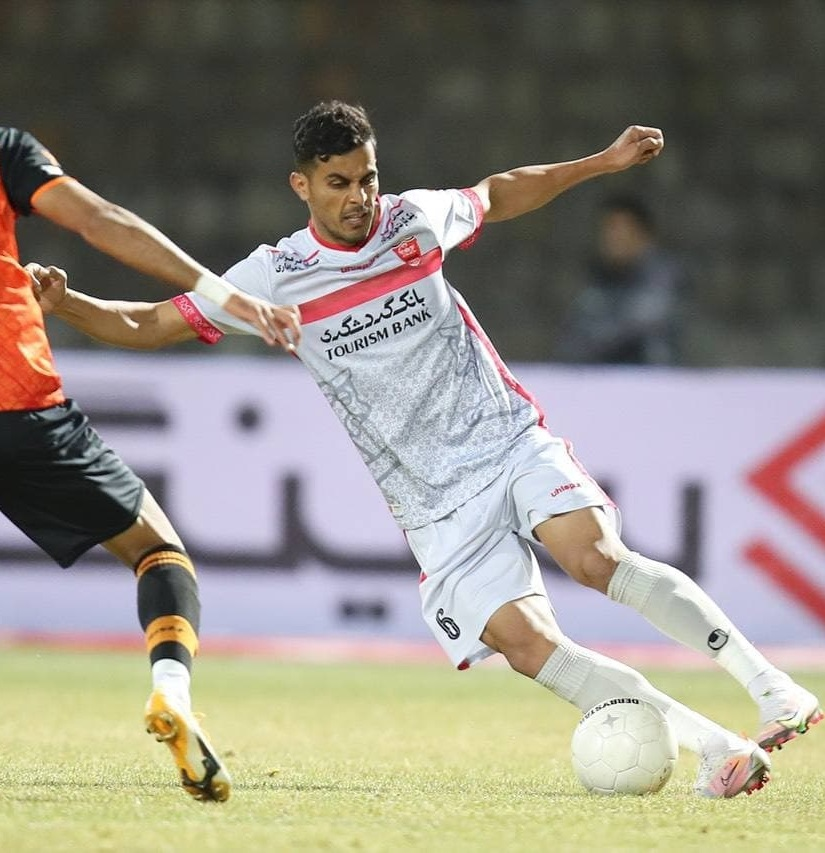
- Nemati with Persepolis in 2021

Personal information
- Date of birth: 8 February 1996 (age 30)
- Place of birth: Neyshabur, Iran
- Height: 1.82 m (6 ft 0 in)
- Positions: Centre-back; left-back

Team information
- Current team: Lusail
- Number: 66

Youth career
- 2014–2017: Padideh

Senior career*
Years	Team	Apps	(Gls)
2017–2021	Padideh	91	(0)
2021–2024	Persepolis	70	(6)
2024–2026	Foolad	48	(2)
2026–	Lusail	1	(0)

International career^{‡}
2024–	Iran	25	(0)
Medal record
Representing Iran
CAFA Nations Cup
Runner-up	2025 Tajikistan–Uzbekistan	Team
- * Club domestic league appearances and goals as of 27 February 2026 ‡ National team caps and goals as of 17 November 2026

Ali Nemati (Persian: علی نعمتی, born 8 February 1996) is an Iranian professional footballer who plays as a Defender for Qatar Stars League club Lusail and the Iran national team.

== Club career ==
=== Persepolis ===
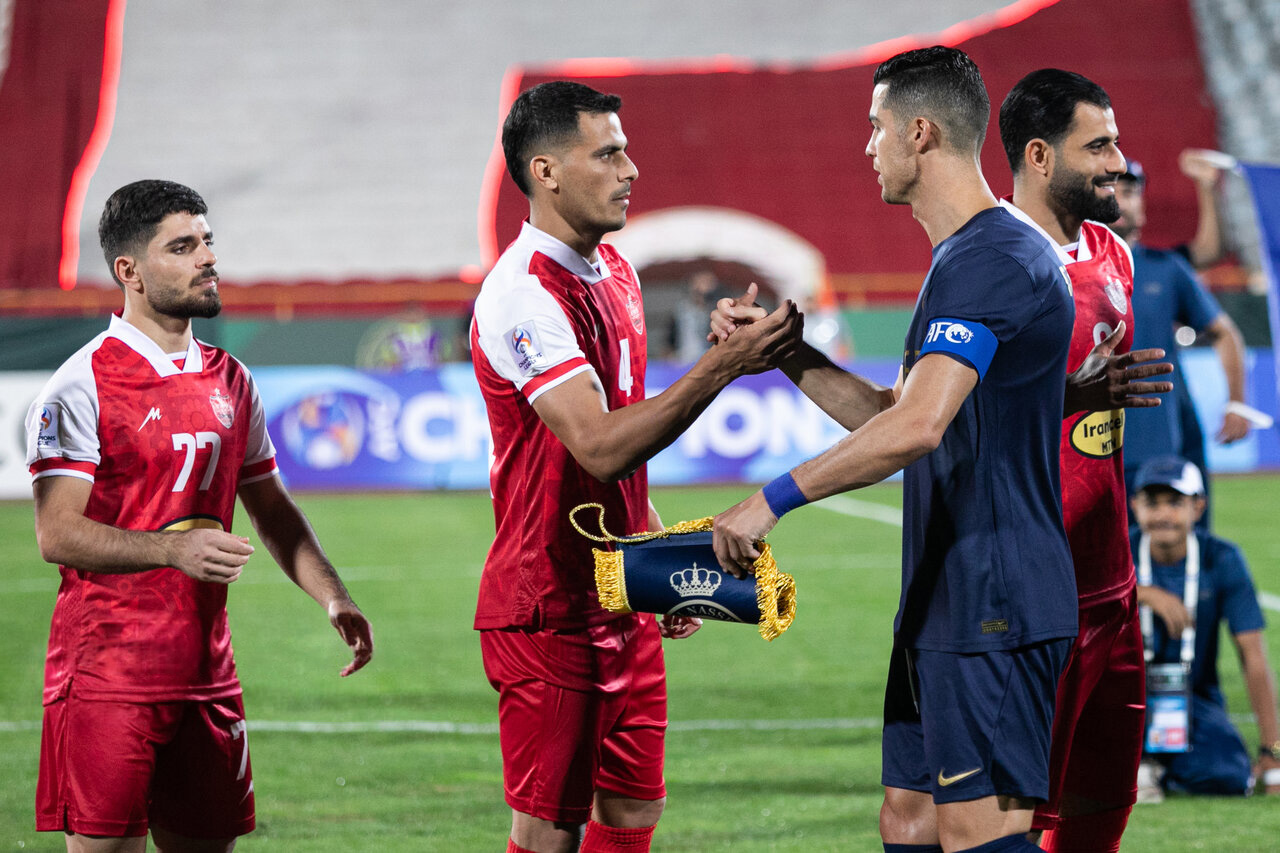
Nemati and Cristiano Ronaldo before an AFC Champions League match in 2023

On 24 August 2021, Nemati signed a three-year contract with Persian Gulf Pro League champions Persepolis.

== International career ==
Nemati made his debut for the Iran national team on 10 October 2024 in a World Cup qualifier against Uzbekistan at the Milliy Stadium. He played the full game in a 0–0 draw.

On 1 June 2026, he was named in the 26-man squad for the 2026 FIFA World Cup.

== Style of play ==
A header defender with hard-working, aggressive, disciplined and hard-tackling style of play, Nemati had a powerful debut. While playing for Persepolis, after scoring 4 goals for the team, he is mentioned as "a good header with impressive ability to play in the left-back."

== Career statistics ==
As of 27 February 2026

Club	Division	Season	League		Hazfi Cup		Asia		Other		Total	
Club	Division	Season	Apps	Goals	Apps	Goals	Apps	Goals	Apps	Goals	Apps	Goals
Padideh	Pro League	2017–18	7	0	0	0	—		—		7	0
Padideh	Pro League	2018–19	29	0	3	0	—		—		32	0
Padideh	Pro League	2019–20	28	0	2	0	7	0	—		37	0
Padideh	Pro League	2020–21	27	0	0	0	—		—		27	0
Padideh	Total		91	0	5	0	7	0	—		103	0
Persepolis	Pro League	2021–22	23	4	3	0	—		1	0	27	4
Persepolis	Pro League	2022–23	25	1	4	0	—		0	0	29	1
Persepolis	Pro League	2023–24	22	1	1	0	6	0	—		29	1
Persepolis	Total		70	6	8	0	6	0	1	0	85	6
Foolad	Pro League	2024–25	28	2	2	0	—		—		30	2
Foolad	Pro League	2025–26	20	0	2	0	—		—		22	0
Foolad	Total		48	2	4	0	0	0	0	0	52	2
Career totals			209	8	17	0	13	0	1	0	240	8

=== International ===
As of match played on 17 November 2026

Appearances and goals by national team and year
National team	Year	Apps	Goals
Iran	2024	4	0
Iran	2025	10	0
Iran	2026	11	0
Total		25	0

== Honours ==
Perspolis

- Persian Gulf Pro League: (2) 2022–23, 2023–24 Runner-up 2021–22
- Hazfi Cup (1): 2022–23
- Iranian Super Cup: 2023 Runner-up: 2021
