= 2022–23 Persepolis F.C. season =

Persepolis
2022–23 season
- Chairman: Reza Darvish
- Manager: Yahya Golmohammadi
- Stadium: Azadi Stadium
- Persian Gulf Pro League: Winners
- Hazfi Cup: Winners
- Top goalscorer: League: Mehdi Torabi (7); All: Giorgi Gvelesiani (10)
- Biggest win: 5-1 vs Nassaji; 4-0 vs Gol Gohar; 4-0 vs Nassaji
- Biggest defeat: 0-1 vs Tractor; 0-1 vs Foolad; 0-1 vs Havadar; 0-1 vs Sepahan

The 2022–23 season is the Persepolis's 22nd season in the Persian Gulf Pro League, and their 40th consecutive season in the top division of Iranian Football. In addition to the domestic league, Persepolis will also participate in this season's Hazfi Cup competitions.

== Squad ==
No.	Name	Age	Nationality	Position (s)	Since	App	Goals	Assist	Ends	Signed from	Transfer fee	Notes
1	Alireza Beiranvand	30	(Iran)	GK	2022	132	0	0	2025	(Belgium) Royal Antwerp	Free	5th Captain
22	Amir Reza Rafiei	20	(Iran)	GK	2022	0	0	0	2025	Nassaji	Free	U-23
44	Mehrshad Asadi	21	(Iran)	GK	2022	0	0	0	2027	Academy	Free	U-23
99	Ahmad Gohari	26	(Iran)	GK	2022	5	0	0	2025	Sanat Naft	Free	
Defenders
3	Farshad Faraji	28	(Iran)	DF	2021	31	1	0	2023	Padideh	Free	
5	Danial Esmaeilifar	29	(Iran)	DF	2022	6	0	0	2024	Sepahan	Free	
6	Ali Nemati	27	(Iran)	DF	2021	24	4	2	2024	Padideh	Free	
8	Morteza Pouraliganji	30	(Iran)	DF	2022	3	0	0	2024	(China) Shenzhen	Free	
15	Abolfazl Soleimani	21	(Iran)	DF	2022	0	0	0	2027	Academy	Free	U-23
30	Giorgi Gvelesiani	31	(Georgia (country))	DF	2022	6	0	0	2024	Sepahan	Free	
38	Ali Joudaki	22	(Iran)	DF	2021	0	0	0	2024	Academy	Free	U-23
66	Vakhdat Khanonov	22	(Tajikistan)	DF	2021	7	0	0	2024	(Tajikistan) Istiklol	€150,000	U-23
Midfielders
2	Omid Alishah	30	(Iran)	MF	2013	192	17	38	2023	Rah Ahan	Free	Captain
7	Soroush Rafiei	32	(Iran)	MF	2022	38	5	3	2024	Sepahan	Free	
9	Mehdi Torabi	28	(Iran)	MF	2018	97	23	30	2024	(Qatar) Al Arabi	Free	
10	Milad Sarlak	27	(Iran)	MF	2020	71	3	3	2023	Padideh	Free	
11	Kamal Kamyabinia	33	(Iran)	MF	2015	196	22	9	2024	Naft Tehran	Free	Vice Captain
17	Mohammad Mehdi Ahmadi	21	(Iran)	MF	2022	2	0	0	2025	Naft MIS	Free	U-23
18	Sina Asadbeigi	25	(Iran)	MF	2022	5	0	0	2025	Zob Ahan	Free	
19	Vahid Amiri	34	(Iran)	MF	2016	166	20	29	2024	(Turkey) Trabzonspor	Free	3rd Captain
21	Saeid Sadeghi	28	(Iran)	MF	2022	6	2	0	2023	Gol Gohar	Free	
80	Mohammad Omri	22	(Iran)	MF	2021	9	0	0	2027	Academy	Free	U-23
88	Siamak Nemati	27	(Iran)	MF	2017	141	15	0	2024	Paykan	Free	4th Captain
Forwards
16	Mehdi Abdi	24	(Iran)	FW	2017	80	23	0	2025	Academy	Free	U-25
25	Cheick Diabaté	34	(Mali)	FW	2022	0	0	0	2023	(Qatar) Al-Gharafa	Free	
31	Alireza Khodadadi	20	(Iran)	FW	2022	0	0	0	2027	Academy	Free	U-23
32	Omid Fahimi	20	(Iran)	FW	2022	0	0	0	2027	Academy	Free	U-23
72	Issa Alekasir	32	(Iran)	FW	2020	26	10	0	2024	Sanat Naft Abadan	Free	
91	Leandro Pereira	31	(Brazil)	FW	2023	0	0	0	2025	(Japan) Gamba Osaka	Free	
Players left the club during the season
4	Jurgen Locadia	29	(Netherlands)	FW	2022	9	6	0	2023	(Germany) VfL Bochum	Free	
40	Hamed Pakdel	31	(Iran)	FW	2022	19	5	0	2023	Aluminium Arak	Free	
70	Sherzod Temirov	24	(Uzbekistan)	FW	2022	11	1	1	2023	(Uzbekistan) Pakhtakor	€227,000	U-25

== New Contracts ==
No	P	Name	Age	Contract length	Contract ends	Source
9	MF	Mehdi Torabi	27	2 season	2024	
10	MF	Milad Sarlak	27	1 season	2023	
88	DF	Siamak Nemati	28	2 season	2024	
99	GK	Ahmad Gohari	26	2 season	2025	
80	MF	Mohammad Omri	22	5 season	2027	

== Transfers ==
=== In ===
Row	No	P	Nationality	Name	Age	Moving from	Ends	Transfer fee	Type	Transfer window	Quota	Source
1	1	GK	(Iran)	Alireza Beiranvand	29	(Belgium) Royal Antwerp	2025		Transfer	Summer		
2	8	DF	(Iran)	Morteza Pouraliganji	30	(China) Shenzhen	2024		Transfer	Summer		
3	5	DF	(Iran)	Danial Esmaeilifar	29	(Iran) Sepahan	2024		Transfer	Summer	PL	
4		DF	(Iran)	Alireza Khodaei	20	(Iran) Saipa	2026		Loan Return	Summer		
5	17	DF	(Iran)	Mohammad Mehdi Ahmadi	21	(Iran) Naft MIS	2025		Transfer	Summer	PL	
6	7	MF	(Iran)	Soroush Rafiei	32	(Iran) Sepahan	2024		Transfer	Summer	PL	
7	30	DF	(Georgia (country))	Giorgi Gvelesiani	31	(Iran) Sepahan	2024		Transfer	Summer	PL	
8	21	MF	(Iran)	Saeid Sadeghi	28	(Iran) Gol Gohar	2023		Transfer	Summer	PL	
9	15	DF	(Iran)	Abolfazl Soleimani	21	(Iran) Academy	2027		Promoted	Summer		
10	81	GK	(Iran)	Amirreza Rafiei	20	(Iran) Nassaji	2025		Transfer	Summer		
11	22	GK	(Iran)	Mehrshad Asadi	20	(Iran) Academy	2027		Promoted	Summer		
12	18	MF	(Iran)	Sina Asadbeigi	25	(Iran) Zob Ahan	2025		Transfer	Summer	PL	
13	31	FW	(Iran)	Alireza Khodadadi	19	(Iran) Academy	2027		Transfer	Summer		
14	32	FW	(Iran)	Omid Fahimi	19	(Iran) Academy	2027		Transfer	Summer		
15	4	FW	(Netherlands)	Jürgen Locadia	28	(Germany) VfL Bochum	2023		Transfer	Summer		
16	25	FW	(Mali)	Cheick Diabaté	34	(Qatar) Al-Gharafa	2023		Transfer	Summer		
17	72	FW	(Iran)	Issa Alekasir	32	Free agent	2024		Transfer	Winter		
18	91	FW	(Brazil)	Leandro Pereira	31	(Japan) Gamba Osaka	2024		Transfer	Winter		
19	37	DF	(Iran)	Alireza Babaei	19	(Iran) Academy	2026		Transfer	Winter		

=== Out ===
Row	No	P	Nat.	Name	Age	Moving to	Transfer fee	Type	Transfer window	Source
1	81	GK	(Iran)	Hamed Lak	31	(Iran) Mes Rafsanjan		Transfer	Summer	
2	77	MF	(Iran)	Saeid Aghaei	27	(Iran) Foolad		Transfer	Summer	
3	27	DF	(Iran)	Ramin Rezaeian	32	(Iran) Sepahan		Transfer	Summer	
4	23	MF	(Iran)	Ali Shojaei	25	(Iran) Nassaji		Transfer	Summer	
5	21	FW	(Iran)	Mehdi Mehdikhani	24	(Iran) Havadar		Transfer	Summer	
6	18	MF	(Iran)	Mohammad Sharifi	22	(Iran) Nassaji		Transfer	Summer	
7	14	MF	(Iran)	Ehsan Pahlavan	28	(Iran) Foolad		Transfer	Summer	
8	4	DF	(Iran)	Jalal Hosseini	40	Retired				
9	32	DF	(Iran)	Ehsan Hosseini	23	(Iran) Aluminium		Transfer	Summer	
10	37	DF	(Iran)	Amir Mohammad Kharkesh	19	(Iran) Havadar		Transfer	Summer	
11	8	MF	(Iran)	Reza Asadi	26	(Iran) Tractor		Transfer	Summer	
12	5	DF	(Iran)	Alireza Ebrahimi	32	(Iran) Nassaji		Transfer	Summer	
13	55	DF	(Tajikistan)	Manuchekhr Safarov	21	(Uzbekistan) Lokomotiv Tashkent		Transfer	Summer	
14		MF	(Iran)	Mohammad Hosseini	22	(Iran) Havadar		Transfer	Summer	
15	72	FW	(Iran)	Issa Alekasir	32			Transfer	Summer	
16	34	GK	(Iran)	Amir Mohammad Yousefi	22	(Iran) Fajr Sepasi		Loan	Summer	
17		DF	(Iran)	Alireza Khodaei	22	(Iran) Naft MIS		Loan	Summer	
18	70	FW	(Uzbekistan)	Sherzod Temirov	23	(Iran) Paykan		Transfer	Summer	
19	40	FW	(Iran)	Hamed Pakdel	31	(Iran) Tractor		Transfer	Winter	
20	4	FW	(Netherlands)	Jürgen Locadia	29	(China) Cangzhou Mighty Lions		Transfer	Winter	

== Technical staff ==
Persepolis Head coach in 2022–23 Persian Gulf Pro League
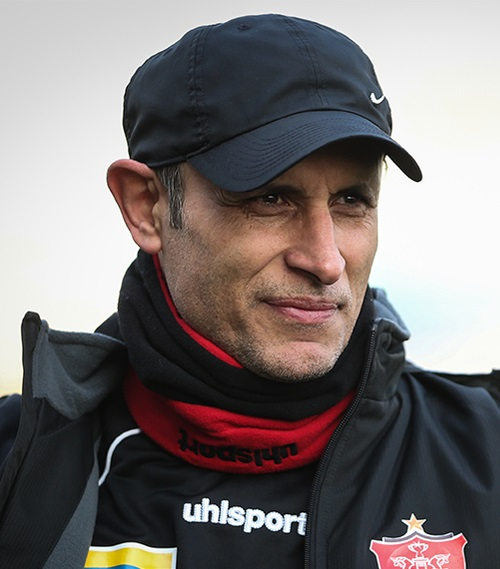

Position	Staff
Head coach	(Iran) Yahya Golmohammadi
First-team coach	(Brazil) Osmar Loss
Assistant coaches	(Iran) Karim Bagheri (Iran) Jalal Hosseini
Goalkeeping coach	(Brazil) Welesley Neneca
Assistant Goalkeeping coach	(Iran) Javad Bagheri
Fitness Coach	(Spain) Jose Augusto Losada Benítez
Assistant Fitness Coach	(Iran) Hassan Tashakorikia
Analyzers	(Iran) Mehrdad Khanban (Iran) Mohammad Asgari
Doctor	(Iran) Dr. Alireza Haghighat
Physiotherapist	(Iran) Ali Aazam
Team Manager	(Iran) Afshin Peyrovani
Media Officer	(Iran) Alireza Ashraf

Position	Staff
Under-23 team coach	(Iran) Mahmoud Ansari
Youth team coach	(Iran) Mehdi Ataloo
Under-17 coach	(Iran) Farzad Ashoubi
Under-14 coach	(Iran) Hassan Khanmohammadi

== Pre-season and friendlies ==
=== Pre-season ===
Win Draw Loss Fixtures

7 July 2022 Friendly	Persepolis	3–1	Persepolis U23	Tehran
	Pakdel 24'; Torabi 50' (pen.), 90'	Report		Stadium: Shahid Kazemi Stadium

13 July 2022 Friendly	Persepolis	2–0	Paykan	Tehran
	Temirov 12'; Pouraliganji 61'	Report		Stadium: Shahid Kazemi Stadium

19 July 2022 Friendly	Persepolis	3–3	Nassaji	Tehran
	Abdi; Temirov; Alishah	Report		Stadium: Shahid Kazemi Stadium

25 July 2022 Friendly	Persepolis	1–1	Mes Kerman	Tehran
	Alishah	Report

31 July 2022 Friendly	Persepolis	4–2	Iran U23	Tehran
	Sadeghi 5', 61'; Abdi 9'; Temirov 63'	Report	Eslami 72', 76'	Stadium: Shahid Kazemi Stadium

6 August 2022 Friendly	Persepolis	2–1	Saipa	Tehran
	Torabi 60'; Abdi 75'	Report	Mamashli 30'	Stadium: Shahid Kazemi Stadium

7 August 2022 Friendly	Persepolis	0–0	Kheybar Khorramabad	Tehran
		Report		Stadium: Shahid Kazemi Stadium

=== Friendlies ===
14 August 2022 Friendly	Persepolis	1–0	Van Pars	Tehran
	Temirov 35'	Report		Stadium: Shahid Kazemi Stadium

20 August 2022 Friendly	Persepolis	2–1	Fajr Sepasi	Tehran
	Locadia 8'; Omri 27'	Report		Stadium: Shahid Kazemi Stadium

20 September 2022 Friendly	Persepolis	0–1	Foolad	Tehran
		Report		Stadium: Shahid Kazemi Stadium

25 September 2022 Friendly	Persepolis	1–0	Gol Gohar	Tehran
	Omri 75'	Report		Stadium: Azadi Stadium

8 October 2022 Friendly	Persepolis	1–1	Havadar	Tehran
	Soleimani 75'	Report		Stadium: Shahid Kazemi Stadium

14 October 2022 Friendly	Persepolis	0–0	Paykan	Tehran
		Report		Stadium: Shahid Kazemi Stadium

21 October 2022 Friendly	Persepolis	3–1	Sardar Zarand	Tehran
	Alishah 75'; A.M Amiri 61'; Abdi 70'	Report		Stadium: Shahid Kazemi Stadium

22 November 2022 Friendly	Persepolis	0–2	Mes Kerman	Tehran
		Report		Stadium: Shahid Kazemi Stadium

3 December 2022 Friendly	Persepolis	2–2	Shams Azar	Tehran
	Nouri; Khodadadi	Report		Stadium: Shahid Kazemi Stadium

4 December 2022 Friendly	Persepolis	2–1	Fajr Sepasi	Tehran
	Alishah 20', 27'	Report		Stadium: Shahid Kazemi Stadium

13 December 2022 Friendly	Persepolis	2–2	Sepahan	Tehran
	Nemati; Pakdel	Report		Stadium: Azadi Stadium

26 December 2022 Friendly	Persepolis	2–2	Chadormalu	Tehran
	Abdi; Pakdel (pen.)	Report		Stadium: Iran National Football Camp

6 January 2023 Friendly	Persepolis	2–1	Gandom Kesht	Tehran
	Abdi; Pakdel (pen.)	Report		Stadium: Iran National Football Camp

21 January 2023 Friendly	Persepolis	1–0	Shohada Aghasht	Tehran
	Makhtoom	Report		Stadium: Iran National Football Camp

14 February 2023 Friendly	Persepolis	6–1	Vista Turbine	Tehran
	Hanonov 12'; Abdi 23', 70'; Pereira 48', 55'; Makhtoom 85'	Report		Stadium: Shahid Kazemi Stadium

26 March 2023 Friendly	Persepolis	2–1	Paykan	Tehran
	Abdi 15'; Sadeghi 23' (pen.)	Report		Stadium: Shahid Kazemi Stadium

8 April 2023 Friendly	Persepolis	3–0	Havadar	Tehran
	Nemati 30'; Pereira 55'; Mahmoudi 85'	Report		Stadium: Shahid Kazemi Stadium

16 April 2023 Friendly	Persepolis	1–0	Saipa	Tehran
	Diabaté 55'	Report		Stadium: Shahid Kazemi Stadium

25 April 2023 Friendly	Persepolis	4–1	Iran U17	Tehran
	Asadbeigi 3'; Pereira 25'; Pereira; Diabaté	Report		Stadium: Shahid Kazemi Stadium

7 May 2023 Friendly	Persepolis	3–0	Shohada Razakan	Tehran
	Omri 10'; Diabaté 72'; Mahmoudi 80'	Report		Stadium: Shahid Kazemi Stadium

== Competitions ==
=== Overview ===
Competition	First match	Last match	Starting round	Final position	Record							
Competition	First match	Last match	Starting round	Final position	Pld	W	D	L	GF	GA	GD	Win %
PGPL	13 August 2022	18 May 2023	Matchday 1	Winners	30	20	6	4	46	13	+33	66.67
Hazfi Cup	10 January 2023	31 May 2023	Round of 32	Winners	5	4	1	0	13	7	+6	80.00
Total					35	24	7	4	59	20	+39	68.57

Last updated: 31 May 2023
Source: Competitions

=== Persian Gulf Pro League ===
==== Results summary ====
Overall								Home						Away					
Pld	W	D	L	GF	GA	GD	Pts	W	D	L	GF	GA	GD	W	D	L	GF	GA	GD
30	20	6	4	46	13	+33	66	9	3	3	21	4	+17	11	3	1	25	9	+16

Last updated: 18 May 2023.
Source: Ipl Stats

==== Results by round ====
Round	1	2	3	4	5	6	7	8	9	10	11	12	13	14	15	16	17	18	19	20	21	22	23	24	25	26	27	28	29	30
Ground	A	H	A	H	A	A	H	A	H	A	H	A	H	A	H	H	A	H	A	H	H	A	H	A	H	A	H	A	H	A
Result	D	D	W	W	W	W	L	D	W	W	W	D	D	W	W	W	L	D	W	L	W	W	L	W	W	W	W	W	W	W
Position	10	12	6	1	1	1	1	2	1	1	1	1	1	1	1	1	1	2	2	2	2	2	3	3	3	3	1	1	1	1
Points	1	2	5	8	11	14	14	15	18	21	24	25	26	29	32	35	35	36	39	39	42	45	45	48	51	54	57	60	63	66

Source: "iranleague".
A = Away; H = Home; W = Win; D = Draw; L = Loss; U = Unfinished

==== League table ====
Pos	Team	Pld	W	D	L	GF	GA	GD	Pts	Qualification or relegation
1	Persepolis (C)	30	20	6	4	46	13	+33	66	Qualification for 2023–24 AFC Champions League group stage
2	Sepahan	30	19	8	3	49	17	+32	65	Qualification for 2023–24 AFC Champions League group stage
3	Esteghlal (Note: Esteghlal did not pay its debts on time and did not obtain an AFC license. They were therefore unable to participate in AFC competitions.)	30	18	8	4	52	22	+30	62	
4	Tractor	30	15	7	8	42	34	+8	52	Qualification for 2023–24 AFC Champions League qualifying play-offs
5	Mes Rafsanjan	30	11	14	5	30	15	+15	47	

Source: Iran Football League Organization - League Full Table, Iplstats
Rules for classification: 1) Points; 2) Head-to-head points; 3) Head-to-head goal difference; 4) Total goal difference; 5) Total goals scored; 6) Play-off at neutral venue.

==== Matches ====
Win Draw Loss Postponed

Date Round	Home	Score	Away	Location

13 August 2022 1	Zob Ahan	0 – 0	Persepolis	Fooladshahr
19:00 IRDT (UTC+04:30)	Sadeghi (yellow card) 27'; Mohammadi (yellow card) 34' (yellow-red card) 53'; Ghasemi (yellow card) 59'; Bagherpasand (yellow card) 65'	Report	Gvelesiani (yellow card) 75'; Rafiei (yellow card) 86'; Sadeghi (yellow card) 88'	Stadium: Foolad Shahr Stadium; Attendance: 0 Referee: Mooud Bonyadifar; Man of the Match: Habib Far Abbasi (Zob Ahan)

19 August 2022 2	Persepolis	0 – 0	Foolad	Tehran
20:30 IRDT (UTC+04:30)	Nemati (yellow card) 16'; Torabi (yellow card) 46'	Report	Abshak (yellow card) 21'; Aghasi (yellow card) 46'; Koushki (red card) 90+7'	Stadium: Azadi Stadium; Attendance: 40,000; Referee: Payam Heidari; Man of the Match: Mehdi Shiri (Foolad)

26 August 2022 3	Aluminium Arak	0 – 1	Persepolis	Arak
19:00 IRDT (UTC+04:30)		Report	Sarlak 42'; Beiranvand (yellow card) 63'	Stadium: Imam Khomeini Stadium; Attendance: 0 Referee: Amir Arab Baraghi; Man of the Match: Milad Sarlak (Persepolis)

31 August 2022 4	Persepolis	2 – 0	Sanat Naft	Tehran
18:30 IRDT (UTC+04:30)	Locadia 27'; Tohidast 80' (o.g.); Omri (yellow card) 89'	Report	Tohidast (yellow card) 45'; Saki (yellow card) 72'	Stadium: Azadi Stadium; Attendance: 30,000; Referee: Amir Saman Soltani; Man of the Match: Jürgen Locadia (Persepolis)

5 September 2022 5	Havadar	1 – 3	Persepolis	Tehran
19:00 IRDT (UTC+04:30)	Rouzitalab (yellow card) 20'; Pourmohammad (red card) 90'	Report	Locadia 13'; Nemati (yellow card) 30'; Sadeghi 36', 63'; Torabi (yellow card) 47'; Rafiei (yellow card) 68'; Gvelesiani (yellow card) 78'	Stadium: Shahid Dastgerdi Stadium; Attendance: 0 Referee: Bijan Heydari; Man of the Match: Saeid Sadeghi (Persepolis)

10 September 2022 6	Naft MIS	1 – 2	Persepolis	Masjed Soleyman
20:00 IRDT (UTC+04:30)	Shenani (yellow card) 15'; Bagheri (yellow card) 45' (yellow-red card) 53'; Kaabi (yellow card) 90+4'	Report	Rafiei (yellow card) 15'; Locadia 54' (pen.), 69'; Pouraliganji (yellow card) 65'; Omri (yellow card) 86'; Pakdel (yellow card) 93'	Stadium: Behnam Mohammadi Stadium; Attendance: 6,000; Referee: Reza Mahdavi; Man of the Match: Jürgen Locadia (Persepolis)

2 October 2022 7	Persepolis	0 – 1	Tractor	Tehran
17:30 IRST (UTC+03:30)	Nemati (yellow card) 2'; Beiranvand (yellow card) 66'; Torabi (penalty missed)	Report	Razzaghpour (yellow card) 57'; Mohammadi (yellow card) 66'; Abbaszadeh 75'; Alves (yellow card) 80'; Akhbari (yellow card) 84'	Stadium: Azadi Stadium; Attendance: 0 Referee: Mooud Bonyadifar

7 October 2022 8	Sepahan	0 – 0	Persepolis	Isfahan
20:00 IRST (UTC+03:30)		Report	Omri (yellow card) 68'	Stadium: Naghsh-e Jahan Stadium; Attendance: 0 Referee: Amir Arab Baraghi

13 October 2022 9	Persepolis	1 – 0	Mes Rafsanjan	Tehran
17:00 IRST (UTC+03:30)	Locadia 19' (pen.); Amiri (yellow card) 29'	Report	Bagheri (yellow card) 16'; Lak (yellow card) 27'; Bahia (yellow card) 79'	Stadium: Azadi Stadium; Attendance: 0 Referee: Koupal Nazemi

20 October 2022 10	Malavan	0 – 1	Persepolis	Anzali
17:00 IRST (UTC+03:30)	Jahani (yellow card) 32'; Sadeghi (yellow card) 84'	Report	Amiri (yellow card) 29'; Locadia 79'; Beiranvand (yellow card) 29'	Stadium: Sirous Ghayeghran Stadium; Attendance: 0 Referee: Ali Safaei

27 October 2022 11	Persepolis	1 – 0	Mes Kerman	Tehran
17:00 IRST (UTC+03:30)	Diabaté 73'; S. Nemati (yellow card) 89'	Report	Tahami (yellow card) 35'; Khodaei Asl (yellow card) 62'	Stadium: Azadi Stadium; Attendance: 0 Referee: Abbas Raki; Man of the Match: Soroush Rafiei (Persepolis)

Mid-season break for 2022 FIFA World Cup

20 December 2022 12	Esteghlal	2 – 2	Persepolis	Tehran
17:30 IRST (UTC+03:30)	Mehri (yellow card) 18'; Cheshmi 30'; Motahari 50'; Rezavand (yellow card) 65'	Report	Gvelesiani 16', 89'	Stadium: Azadi Stadium; Referee: Mohammed Hossein Zahedi Fard; Man of the Match: Giorgi Gvelesiani (Persepolis)

25 December 2022 13	Persepolis	0 – 0	Paykan	Tehran
15:30 IRST (UTC+03:30)	Gvelesiani (yellow card) 33'	Report	Taraji (yellow card) 82'; Majd (yellow card) 90'; Azadeh (yellow card) 90+2'	Stadium: Azadi Stadium; Referee: Morteza Mansourian; Man of the Match: Alireza Beiranvand (Persepolis)

31 December 2022 14	Gol Gohar	0 – 2	Persepolis	Sirjan
16:00 IRST (UTC+03:30)	Shekari (yellow card) 14'; Mosleh (yellow card) 36'; Ghaseminejad (yellow card) 60'; Alizadeh (yellow card) 67'	Report	Omri 49'; Asadbeigi (yellow card) 26' (goal) 79'	Stadium: Gol Gohar Sport Complex; Referee: Amir Saman Soltani; Man of the Match: Alireza Beiranvand (Persepolis)

5 January 2023 15	Persepolis	5 – 1	Nassaji	Tehran
16:00 IRST (UTC+03:30)	Gvelesiani 7' (p.); Omri 21' 33'; Sarlak (yellow card) 32'; Esmaeilifar 51' 54'; Torabi (yellow card) 60' (red card) 61'; Hanonov (yellow card) 88'	Report	Kalantari 10' (yellow card) 34'; Mousavi (yellow card) 58'; Shiri (yellow card) 85'	Stadium: Azadi Stadium; Referee: Ali Safaei; Man of the Match: Danial Esmaeilifar (Persepolis)

16 January 2023 16	Persepolis	1 – 0	Zob Ahan	Tehran
16:30 IRST (UTC+03:30)	Pouraliganji (yellow card) 26'; Hanonov (yellow card) 60'; Alishah 69'; Rafiei (yellow card) 88'	Report	Far Abbasi (yellow card) 66'	Stadium: Azadi Stadium; Referee: Vahid Kazemi; Man of the Match: Omid Alishah (Persepolis)

27 January 2023 17	Foolad	1 – 0	Persepolis	Ahvaz
17:15 IRST (UTC+03:30)	Torres 22'; Hazbavi (yellow card) 63'; Ghobeishavi (yellow card) 84'	Report	Amiri (yellow card) 66'; Kamyabinia (yellow card) 81'	Stadium: Foolad Arena; Referee: Mooud Bonyadifar; Man of the Match: Roberto Torres (Foolad)

1 February 2023 18	Persepolis	0 – 0	Aluminium Arak	Tehran
15:45 IRST (UTC+03:30)	Sarlak (yellow card) 35'; Beiranvand (red card) 43'	Report	Zapata (yellow card) 31'; Mousavi (yellow card) 53'	Stadium: Azadi Stadium; Attendance: 5,000; Referee: Morteza Mansourian; Man of the Match: Hossein Pour Hamidi (Aluminium Arak)

8 February 2023 19	Sanat Naft	1 – 2	Persepolis	Abadan
18:00 IRST (UTC+03:30)	Yousefi 8' (yellow card) 67'; Vakia (yellow card) 16'; Nassari (yellow card) 23'; Mamizadeh (yellow card) 45+1'; Ferydoon (yellow card) 63'; Piriz (yellow card) 83'	Report	Diabaté 19' 47'	Stadium: Takhti Stadium; Attendance: 2,000; Referee: Payam Heidari; Man of the Match: Cheick Diabaté (Persepolis)

13 February 2023 20	Persepolis	0 – 1	Havadar	Tehran
16:30 IRST (UTC+03:30)	Asadbeigi (yellow card) 35'; Rafiei (yellow card) 90+1'	Report	Shojaei (yellow card) 71'; Mohammadi 86'	Stadium: Azadi Stadium; Attendance: 5,000; Referee: Hassan Akrami; Man of the Match: Mohammad Javad Mohammadi (Havadar)

27 February 2023 21	Persepolis	3 – 0	Naft MIS	Tehran
16:45 IRST (UTC+03:30)	Asadbeigi 21'; Torabi 45+5'; Hanonov (yellow card) 46'; Abdi 89'; Kamyabinia (yellow card) 90+1'	Report	Miri (penalty missed); Zabihi (yellow card) 45+1'; Abdollahi (yellow card) 83'; Barzegar (yellow card) 90+1'	Stadium: Azadi Stadium; Attendance: 7,000; Referee: Koupal Nazemi; Man of the Match: Vahid Amiri (Persepolis)

5 March 2023 22	Tractor	2 – 3	Persepolis	Tabriz
16:00 IRST (UTC+03:30)	Hosseini (yellow card) 65'; Abbaszadeh 67' 84' (pen.)	Report	Omri 18'; Torabi 31'; Alishah (yellow card) 75'; Hanonov 90+5'	Stadium: Shahid Qasem Soleimani Stadium; Attendance: 0 Referee: Vahid Kazemi; Man of the Match: Mohammad Abbaszadeh (Tractor)

11 March 2023 23	Persepolis	0 – 1	Sepahan	Tehran
16:45 IRST (UTC+03:30)	Pereira (yellow card) 39' (red card) 45+2'	Report	Rezaeian (yellow card) 50'; Rigi (yellow card) 70'; Daneshgar (yellow card) 90+1'; Karimi 90+4'	Stadium: Azadi Stadium; Attendance: 40,000; Referee: Payam Heidari; Man of the Match: Mohammad Karimi (Sepahan)

31 March 2023 24	Mes Rafsanjan	0 – 1	Persepolis	Rafsanjan
21:30 IRDT (UTC+04:30)	Abdi (yellow card) 6'; Sarlak (yellow card) 28'; Gvelesiani 30' (pen.); Rafiei (yellow card) 79'	Report	Soleimanzadeh (red card) 25'; Lak (yellow card) 27'; Rezaei (yellow card) 28'	Stadium: Shohadaye Mes Rafsanjan Stadium; Attendance: 7,000; Referee: Amir Arab Baraghi; Man of the Match: Giorgi Gvelesiani (Persepolis)

6 April 2023 25	Persepolis	3 – 0	Malavan	Tehran
19:30 IRDT (UTC+04:30)	Torabi 36'; Sadeghi 40'; Asadbeigi (yellow card) 65'; Pereira 82'; Esmaeilifar (yellow card) 90+3'	Report	Khoshkafa (yellow card) 28'; Naeijpour (yellow card) 55'	Stadium: Azadi Stadium; Attendance: 10,000; Referee: Bijan Heydari; Man of the Match: Mehdi Torabi (Persepolis)

14 April 2023 26	Mes Kerman	1 – 3	Persepolis	Kerman
19:30 IRDT (UTC+04:30)	Pouraliganji 63' (o.g.)		Sadeghi 22'; Pouraliganji (yellow card) 64'; Gvelesiani 26' (pen.) 85' (pen.)	Stadium: Shahid Bahonar Stadium; Attendance: 15,000; Referee: Koupal Nazemi; Man of the Match: Saeid Sadeghi (Persepolis)

23 April 2023 27	Persepolis	1 – 0	Esteghlal	Tehran
16:00 IRDT (UTC+04:30)	Sarlak (yellow card) 29'; Alekasir 50' (yellow card) 50'		Gholami (yellow card) 19'; Mohebi (yellow card) 90+4'	Stadium: Azadi Stadium; Attendance: 40,000; Referee: Payam Heidari; Man of the Match: Ali Nemati (Persepolis)

6 May 2023 28	Paykan	0 – 1	Persepolis	Tehran
18:00 IRDT (UTC+04:30)	Bagheri (yellow card) 83'; Hosseini (yellow card) 85'		Torabi 80' (pen.); Pereira (yellow card) 87'	Stadium: Azadi Stadium; Attendance: 15,000; Referee: Mooud Bonyadifar; Man of the Match: Mehdi Torabi (Persepolis)

12 May 2023 29	Persepolis	4 – 0	Gol Gohar	Tehran
18:00 IRDT (UTC+04:30)	Torabi 23' 33' 49'; Sadeghi 45'; Pereira (yellow card) 90+3'		Ashouri (yellow card) 13'; Khodabandelou (yellow card) 33'	Stadium: Azadi Stadium; Attendance: 40,000; Referee: Mohammad Hossein Zahedi Fard; Man of the Match: Mehdi Torabi (Persepolis)

18 May 2023 30	Nassaji	0 – 4	Persepolis	Qaem Shahr
18:00 IRDT (UTC+04:30)	Abdi (yellow card) 1' (red card) 15'; Shojaei (yellow card) 9'; Zamehran (yellow card) 81' (red card) 82'	Report	Nemati 2'; Sadeghi 28'; Rafiei (yellow card) 5' (goal) 75'; Sarlak 78'; Gvelesiani (yellow card) 87'	Stadium: Vatani Stadium; Attendance: 10,000; Referee: Bijan Heydari; Man of the Match: Milad Sarlak (Persepolis)

==== Score overview ====
Win Draw Loss

Opposition	Home score	Away score	Aggregate score
Aluminium	0–0	0–1	1–0
Esteghlal	1–0	2–2	3–2
Foolad	0–0	1–0	0–1
Gol Gohar	4–0	0–2	6–0
Havadar	0–1	1–3	3–2
Malavan	3–0	0–1	4–0
Mes Rafsanjan	1–0	0–1	2–0
Naft MIS	3–0	1–2	5–1
Nassaji	5–1	0–4	9–1
Paykan	0–0	0–1	1–0
Mes Kerman	1–0	1–3	4–1
Sanat Naft	2–0	1–2	4–1
Sepahan	0–1	0–0	0–1
Tractor	0–1	2–3	3–3
Zob Ahan	1–0	0–0	1–0

=== Hazfi Cup ===
10 January 2023 Round of 32	Persepolis	2 – 2 (a.e.t.) (4–1 p)	Van Pars	Tehran
15:00 IRST (UTC+03:30)	Gvelesiani 60' (pen.); Pouraliganji 77'; Sarlak (penalty missed)	Report	Kiani 10' (pen.); Safarzadeh 66'	Stadium: Azadi Stadium; Attendance: 0 Referee: Sa'ad Vafapisheh; Man of the Match: Ahmad Mehrabi (Van Pars)
	Penalties
	Torabi (penalty scored); Pouraliganji (penalty scored); Faraji (penalty scored); Omri (penalty scored)		(penalty missed) Kiani; (penalty scored) Azadmanesh; (penalty missed) Shouryabi

22 February 2023 Round of 16	Sepahan	2 – 4 (a.e.t.)	Persepolis	Isfahan
15:00 IRST (UTC+03:30)	Yazdani (yellow card) 11' (yellow-red card) 99'; Daneshgar (yellow card) 21'; Esmaeilifar 41' (o.g.); Rigi (yellow card) 55'; Ahmadzadeh 74'; Noorafkan (yellow card) 78'; Rezaeian (yellow card) 95'	Report	Gvelesiani 12' (pen.) 100' (pen.); Alekasir 58'; Asadbeigi (yellow card) 65'; Beiranvand (yellow card) 75'; Sarlak (yellow card) 75'; Nemati 94'	Stadium: Naghsh-e Jahan Stadium; Attendance: 38/000; Referee: Bijan Heydari; Man of the Match: Giorgi Gvelesiani (Persepolis)

30 April 2023 Quarter Final	Persepolis	2 – 1	Gol Gohar	Tehran
17:30 IRDT (UTC+04:30)	Torabi 31' (pen.) (yellow card) 58'; Alekasir 45+1' (yellow card) 56'; Esmaeilifar (yellow card) 64'; Rafiei (yellow card) 75'; Pouraliganji (yellow card) 85'		Shekari 52'; Zahedi (yellow card) 55'; Barzay (yellow card) 90+3'	Stadium: Azadi Stadium; Attendance: 15/000; Referee: Vahid Kazemi; Man of the Match: Mehdi Torabi (Persepolis)

25 May 2023 Semi-Final	Havadar	1 – 3	Perspolis	Tehran
18:30 IRDT (UTC+04:30)	Entezari (yellow card) 10'; Shojaei (penalty missed); Moradi 61' (pen.); Miri (yellow card) 90+6'		Gvelesiani 4' (pen.); Amiri 9'; Alekasir 72'	Stadium: Shahid Dastgerdi Stadium; Attendance: 0 Referee: Ali Safaei; Man of the Match: Vahid Amiri (Persepolis)

31 May 2023 Final	Esteghlal	1 – 2 (a.e.t.)	Persepolis	Tehran
19:45 IRST (UTC+03:30)	Babaei (yellow card) 46'; Cheshmi (yellow card) 69'; Moradmand 90+11'		Torabi 30' (yellow card) 69'; Rafiei (yellow card) 55'; Esmaeilifar (yellow card) 65'; Nemati (yellow card) 69'; Alekasir (yellow card) 90+6'; Alishah 115'; Abdi (yellow card) 120+2'	Stadium: Azadi Stadium; Attendance: 60/000; Referee: Ashkan Khorshidi; Man of the Match: Mehdi Torabi (Persepolis)

== Statistics ==
=== Goal scorers ===
Player left the club during the season.

Place	Position	Nation	Number	Name	PGPL	Hazfi Cup	Total
1	DF	(Georgia (country))	30	Giorgi Gvelesiani	6	4	10
2	MF	(Iran)	9	Mehdi Torabi	7	2	9
3	FW	(Netherlands)	4	Jürgen Locadia	6	0	6
3	MF	(Iran)	21	Saeid Sadeghi	6	0	6
4	FW	(Iran)	72	Issa Alekasir	1	3	4
4	MF	(Iran)	80	Mohammad Omri	4	0	4
5	FW	(Mali)	25	Cheick Diabaté	3	0	3
6	DF	(Iran)	5	Danial Esmaeilifar	2	0	2
6	MF	(Iran)	10	Milad Sarlak	2	0	2
6	MF	(Iran)	18	Sina Asadbeigi	2	0	2
6	MF	(Iran)	2	Omid Alishah	1	1	2
7	DF	(Iran)	6	Ali Nemati	1	0	1
7	MF	(Iran)	7	Soroush Rafiei	1	0	1
7	FW	(Iran)	16	Mehdi Abdi	1	0	1
7	DF	(Tajikistan)	66	Vahdat Hanonov	1	0	1
7	FW	(Brazil)	91	Leandro Pereira	1	0	1
7	DF	(Iran)	8	Morteza Pouraliganji	0	1	1
7	MF	(Iran)	19	Vahid Amiri	0	1	1
7	MF	(Iran)	88	Siamak Nemati	0	1	1
Own goal					1	0	1
Total					46	13	59
Last updated: 31 May 2023

=== Assists ===
Place	Position	Nation	Number	Name	PGPL	Hazfi Cup	Total
1	MF	(Iran)	9	Mehdi Torabi	8	1	9
2	DF	(Iran)	5	Danial Esmaeilifar	6	0	6
3	MF	(Iran)	19	Vahid Amiri	2	1	3
3	MF	(Iran)	21	Saeid Sadeghi	2	1	3
4	DF	(Iran)	6	Ali Nemati	2	0	2
4	MF	(Iran)	7	Soroush Rafiei	2	0	2
4	FW	(Iran)	72	Issa Alekasir	2	0	2
4	DF	(Iran)	8	Morteza Pouraliganji	1	1	2
5	MF	(Iran)	2	Omid Alishah	1	0	1
5	MF	(Iran)	10	Milad Sarlak	1	0	1
5	FW	(Iran)	16	Mehdi Abdi	1	0	1
5	MF	(Iran)	80	Mohammad Omri	1	0	1
Total					29	4	33
Last updated: 31 May 2023

=== Goalkeeping ===
				PGPL			Hazfi Cup			Total		
Rank	No	N	Name	M	GA	CS	M	GA	CS	M	GA	CS
1	1	(Iran)	Alireza Beiranvand	29	12	18	5	5	1	34	17	19
2	99	(Iran)	Ahmad Gohari	3	1	2	1	2	0	4	3	2
3	22	(Iran)	Amirreza Rafiei	0	0	0	0	0	0	0	0	0
4	44	(Iran)	Mehrshad Asadi	0	0	0	0	0	0	0	0	0
Total				32	13	20	6	7	1	38	20	21
Last updated: 31 May 2023

=== Playing statistics ===
No.	Pos	Nat	Player	Total		PGPL		Hazfi Cup	
No.	Pos	Nat	Player	Apps	Goals	Apps	Goals	Apps	Goals
Goalkeeper
1	GK	(Iran)	Alireza Beiranvand	34	0	29	0	5	0
99	DF	(Iran)	Ahmad Gohari	4	0	3	0	1	0
Defenders
3	DF	(Iran)	Farshad Faraji	21	0	18	0	3	0
5	DF	(Iran)	Danial Esmaeilifar	35	2	30	2	5	0
6	DF	(Iran)	Ali Nemati	29	1	25	1	4	0
8	DF	(Iran)	Morteza Pouraliganji	30	1	25	0	5	1
30	DF	(Georgia (country))	Giorgi Gvelesiani	33	10	29	6	4	4
37	DF	(Iran)	Alireza Babaei	1	0	1	0	0	0
66	DF	(Tajikistan)	Vakhdat Khanonov	15	1	10	1	5	0
Midfielders
2	MF	(Iran)	Omid Alishah	25	2	21	1	4	1
7	MF	(Iran)	Soroush Rafiei	30	1	25	1	5	0
9	MF	(Iran)	Mehdi Torabi	34	9	29	7	5	2
10	MF	(Iran)	Milad Sarlak	31	2	26	2	5	0
11	MF	(Iran)	Kamal Kamyabinia	22	0	20	0	2	0
17	MF	(Iran)	Mohammad Mehdi Ahmadi	1	0	1	0	0	0
18	MF	(Iran)	Sina Asadbeigi	31	2	26	2	5	0
19	MF	(Iran)	Vahid Amiri	29	1	24	0	5	1
21	MF	(Iran)	Saeid Sadeghi	27	6	24	6	3	0
80	MF	(Iran)	Mohammad Omri	30	4	26	4	4	0
88	DF	(Iran)	Siamak Nemati	15	1	13	0	2	1
Forwards
4	FW	(Netherlands)	Jürgen Locadia	9	6	9	6	0	0
16	FW	(Iran)	Mehdi Abdi	19	1	16	1	3	0
25	FW	(Mali)	Cheick Diabaté	9	3	9	3	0	0
40	FW	(Iran)	Hamed Pakdel	8	0	8	0	0	0
72	FW	(Iran)	Issa Alekasir	16	4	12	1	4	3
91	FW	(Brazil)	Leandro Pereira	11	1	9	1	2	0
Last updated: 31 May 2023

=== Disciplinary record ===
Includes all competitive matches. Players with 1 card or more are included only.

Player left the club during the season.

				PGPL			Hazfi Cup			Total		
No	P	N	Name	Yellow card	Double yellow card	Red card	Yellow card	Double yellow card	Red card	Yellow card	Double yellow card	Red card
1	GK	(Iran)	Alireza Beiranvand	3	0	1	1	0	0	4	0	1
2	MF	(Iran)	Omid Alishah	1	0	0	0	0	0	1	0	0
3	DF	(Iran)	Farshad Faraji	0	0	0	0	0	0	0	0	0
4	FW	(Netherlands)	Jürgen Locadia	0	0	0	0	0	0	0	0	0
5	DF	(Iran)	Danial Esmaeilifar	1	0	0	2	0	0	3	0	0
6	DF	(Iran)	Ali Nemati	3	0	0	1	0	0	4	0	0
7	MF	(Iran)	Soroush Rafiei	7	0	0	2	0	0	9	0	0
8	DF	(Iran)	Morteza Pouraliganji	3	0	0	1	0	0	4	0	0
9	MF	(Iran)	Mehdi Torabi	3	1	0	2	0	0	5	1	0
10	MF	(Iran)	Milad Sarlak	4	0	0	1	0	0	5	0	0
11	MF	(Iran)	Kamal Kamyabinia	2	0	0	0	0	0	2	0	0
15	DF	(Iran)	Abolfazl Soleimani	0	0	0	0	0	0	0	0	0
16	FW	(Iran)	Mehdi Abdi	1	0	0	1	0	0	2	0	0
17	DF	(Iran)	Mohammad Mehdi Ahmadi	0	0	0	0	0	0	0	0	0
18	MF	(Iran)	Sina Asadbeigi	3	0	0	1	0	0	4	0	0
19	MF	(Iran)	Vahid Amiri	3	0	0	0	0	0	3	0	0
21	MF	(Iran)	Saeid Sadeghi	1	0	0	0	0	0	1	0	0
22	GK	(Iran)	Amirreza Rafiei	0	0	0	0	0	0	0	0	0
25	FW	(Mali)	Cheick Diabaté	0	0	0	0	0	0	0	0	0
30	DF	(Georgia (country))	Giorgi Gvelesiani	4	0	0	0	0	0	4	0	0
38	FW	(Iran)	Ali Joudaki	0	0	0	0	0	0	0	0	0
40	FW	(Iran)	Hamed Pakdel	1	0	0	0	0	0	1	0	0
44	GK	(Iran)	Mehrshad Asadi	0	0	0	0	0	0	0	0	0
66	DF	(Tajikistan)	Vahdat Hanonov	3	0	0	0	0	0	3	0	0
72	DF	(Iran)	Issa Alekasir	1	0	0	2	0	0	3	0	0
80	MF	(Iran)	Mohammad Omri	3	0	0	0	0	0	3	0	0
88	DF	(Iran)	Siamak Nemati	1	0	0	0	0	0	1	0	0
91	FW	(Brazil)	Leandro Pereira	3	1	0	0	0	0	3	1	0
99	GK	(Iran)	Ahmad Gohari	0	0	0	0	0	0	0	0	0
Total				51	2	1	14	0	0	65	2	1

Last updated: 31 May 2023.
Source: Competitive matches

== The best of week ==
=== Man of the Match ===
Player left the club during the season.

Place	Position	Nation	Number	Name	weeks	PGPL	Hazfi Cup	Total
1	MF	(Iran)	9	Mehdi Torabi	25,28,29	3	2	5
2	DF	(Georgia (country))	30	Giorgi Gvelesiani	12,24	2	1	3
3	FW	(Netherlands)	4	Jürgen Locadia	4,6	2	0	2
3	GK	(Iran)	1	Alireza Beiranvand	13,14	2	0	2
3	MF	(Iran)	21	Saeid Sadeghi	5,26	2	0	2
3	MF	(Iran)	10	Milad Sarlak	3,30	2	0	2
3	MF	(Iran)	19	Vahid Amiri	21	1	1	2
4	MF	(Iran)	7	Soroush Rafiei	11	1	0	1
4	DF	(Iran)	5	Danial Esmaeilifar	15	1	0	1
4	MF	(Iran)	2	Omid Alishah	16	1	0	1
4	FW	(Mali)	25	Cheick Diabaté	19	1	0	1
4	DF	(Iran)	6	Ali Nemati	27	1	0	1
Total						19	4	23
Last updated: 31 May 2023

=== Player of the Week ===
Weeks	Player of the Week		References
Weeks	Player	Point	References
Week 5	(Iran) Saeid Sadeghi	8.94	
Week 6	(Netherlands) Jürgen Locadia	8.75	
Week 12	(Georgia (country)) Giorgi Gvelesiani	8.57	
Week 15	(Iran) Danial Esmaeilifar	9.08	
Week 25	(Iran) Mehdi Torabi	8.85	
Week 29	(Iran) Mehdi Torabi	9.53	

=== Team of the Week ===
Weeks	Team of the Week		References
Weeks	Team	Point	References
Week 5	Persepolis	7.6	

Last updated: 13 september 2022.

== Club ==
=== Kit ===
Supplier: (Germany) Uhlsport
