= 2023 Hazfi Cup final =

- Event: 2022–23 Hazfi Cup
Esteghlal	Persepolis
1	2
- Date: 31 May 2023
- Venue: Azadi Stadium, Tehran
- Referee: Ashkan Khorshidi
- Attendance: 60,000

2023 Hazfi Cup final was the final match of the 36th edition of Hazfi Cup that was held between Esteghlal Tehran and Persepolis at Azadi Stadium in Tehran on 31 May 2023.

Originally, the final was planned to be held at Shohadaye Mes Kerman Stadium in Kerman accourding to quarter-final stage draw but later, due to pitch issues, the second priority was selected, Yadegar-e Emam Stadium in Tabriz. However, the opposition of East Azerbaijan Football Board, didn't let Tabriz to be host of the final match. Finally, such as previous season, Azadi Stadium in Tehran chose as the host stadium.

This was the 6th Tehran derby match in Hazfi Cup and 2nd derby in final. The previous results between Esteghlal and Perspolis in Hazfi Cup are as follows:

Derby No.	Season	Date (dd-mm-yyyy)	Home team	Score	Away team	Home goal scorers	Away goal scorers	Round	Winner
31	1988–89	10-03-1989	Esteghlal	0–0 (2–4 p.)	Persepolis	–	–	Quarter-final	Persepolis in penalties
47	1998–99	11-07-1999	Persepolis	2–1	Esteghlal	Hasheminasab 12' (pen.), Peyrovani 85'	Bakhtiarizadeh 50'	Final	Persepolis
74	2011–12	09-12-2011	Persepolis	0–3 (a.e.t)	Esteghlal	–	M. Jabbari 95', 99' (pen.), Sharifat 107'	Quarter-final	Esteghlal at extra time
93	2019–20	26-08-2020	Persepolis	2–2 (1–4 p.)	Esteghlal	Resan 48', Alipour 89'	Ghayedi 4', Daneshgar 90+3'	Semi-final	Esteghlal in penalties
96	2020–21	15-07-2021	Persepolis	0–0 (3–4 p.)	Esteghlal	–	–	Quarter-final	Esteghlal in penalties

== Teams ==
Team	City	Previous finals appearances
Esteghlal	Tehran	13 (1977, 1991, 1996, 1999, 2000, 2002, 2004, 2008, 2012, 2016, 2018, 2020, 2021)
Persepolis	Tehran	8 (1987, 1992, 1999, 2006, 2010, 2011, 2013, 2019)

== Route to the final ==
=== Esteghlal Tehran ===
Round	Opposition	Score
Round of 32	Tractor (H)	2-1 (a.e.t.)
Round of 16	Malavan (H)	2-0
Quarter Final	Pars Jonoubi Jam (A)	1-0 (a.e.t.)
Semi-Final	Nassaji Mazandaran (H)	4-0
Key: (H) = Home venue; (A) = Away venue; (N) = Neutral venue

As a Persian Gulf Pro League, Esteghlal entered the competition from Round of 32.

They beat Tractor at home in the fourth round.

They beat Malavan at home in the fifth round.

They beat Pars Jonoubi Jam at Jam in the quarter-final.

They beat the defending champion, Nassaji Mazandaran at home in the semi-final.

They played 3 of their 4 matches at home before final and the final match also will be play at their home stadium.

=== Perspolis ===
Round	Opposition	Score
Round of 32	Van Pars Naghse Jahan (H)	2-2 (a.e.t.) (4-1 p)
Round of 16	Sepahan (A)	4-2 (a.e.t.)
Quarter Final	Gol Gohar (H)	2-1
Semi-Final	Havadar (A)	3-1
Key: (H) = Home venue; (A) = Away venue; (N) = Neutral venue

As a Persian Gulf Pro League, Perspolis entered the competition from Round of 32.

They beat Van Pars Naghse Jahan at home in the fourth round.

They beat Sepahan at Naghsh-e Jahan Stadium in the fifth round.

They beat Gol Gohar at home in the quarter-final.

They beat Havadar at PAS Ghvamin Stadium in the semi-final.

== Details ==
31 May 2023
19:45
Final

Esteghlal	1-2 (a.e.t.)	Persepolis
Mohammad Hossein Moradmand 90'+11	Report	Mehdi Torabi 30'; Omid Alishah 115'

Azadi Stadium, Tehran
Attendance: 60000
Referee: Ashkan Khorshidi

Esteghlal	Perspolis

Esteghlal: 4-4-2
GK	1	(Iran) Hossein Hosseini (c)
DF	3	(Iran) Mohammad Hossein Moradmand	90+11'
DF	55	(Brazil) Raphael Silva
DF	17	(Iran) Jafar Salmani		(substituted off) 67'
DF	2	(Iran) Saleh Hardani
MF	4	(Iran) Rouzbeh Cheshmi	(yellow card) 69'	(substituted off) 85'
MF	88	(Iran) Arash Rezavand		(substituted off) 85'
MF	50	(Iran) Saeid Mehri
MF	12	(Iran) Mehdi Ghayedi		(substituted off) 115'
FW	72	(Iran) Amir Arsalan Motahari		(substituted off) 32'
FW	77	(Iran) Mohammad Mohebi		(substituted off) 85'
Substitutes:
GK	90	(Iran) Sina Saeidifar
MF	55	(Iran) Aref Gholami		(substituted on) 99'
MF	33	(Iran) Abolfazl Jalali		(substituted on) 67'
FF	14	(Iran) Zobeir Niknafs		(substituted on) 85'
FF	23	(Iran) Arman Ramezani		(substituted on) 85'
FF	10	(Iran) Sajjad Shahbazzadeh		(substituted on) 85'
FF	18	(Iran) Peyman Babaei	(yellow card) 46'	(substituted on) 32'
Manager:
(Portugal) Ricardo Sá Pinto

Porspolis: 4-2-3-1
GK	1	(Iran) Alireza Beiranvand
DF	30	(Georgia (country)) Giorgi Gvelesiani
DF	8	(Iran) Morteza Pouraliganji
DF	5	(Iran) Danial Esmaeilifar	(yellow card) 65'	(substituted off) 70'
DF	6	(Iran) Ali Nemati	(yellow card) 69'
MF	7	(Iran) Soroush Rafiei	(yellow card) 55'	(substituted off) 89'
MF	9	(Iran) Mehdi Torabi	30'	(yellow card) 69'
MF	10	(Iran) Milad Sarlak
MF	19	(Iran) Vahid Amiri (c)
MF	21	(Iran) Saeid Sadeghi		(substituted off) 89'
FW	72	(Iran) Issa Alekasir	(yellow card) 90+6'	(substituted off) 90+10'
Substitutes:
GK	99	(Iran) Ahmad Gohari
MF	3	(Iran) Farshad Faraji		(substituted on) 70'
MF	18	(Iran) Sina Asadbeigi		(substituted on) 89'
MF	2	(Iran) Omid Alishah	115'	(substituted on) 89'
FW	16	(Iran) Mehdi Abdi	(yellow card) 120+2'	(substituted on) 90+10'
DF	66	(Tajikistan) Vakhdat Khanonov
MF	11	(Iran) Kamal Kamyabinia
MF	80	(Iran) Mohammad Omri
FW	25	(Mali) Cheick Diabaté (footballer, born 1988)
Manager:
(Iran) Yahya Golmohammadi

Referee:
(Iran) Ashkan Khorshidi
Assistant Referees:
(Iran) Alireza Ilderom
(Iran) Hasan Zahiri
Additional AR:
(Iran) Mohammad Hossein Zahedifard
(Iran) Seyed Ali Asghar Momeni
Fourth official:
(Iran) Mohammad Hossein Torabian

Match rules:

- 90 minutes
- 30 minutes of extra-time if necessary
- Penalty shoot-out if scores still level
- Nine named substitutes
- Maximum of five substitutions in normal time and another substitution in extra time

== See also ==
- 2022–23 Persian Gulf Pro League
- 2022–23 Azadegan League
- 2022–23 Hazfi Cup
