= Welesley Neneca =

Brazilian footballer

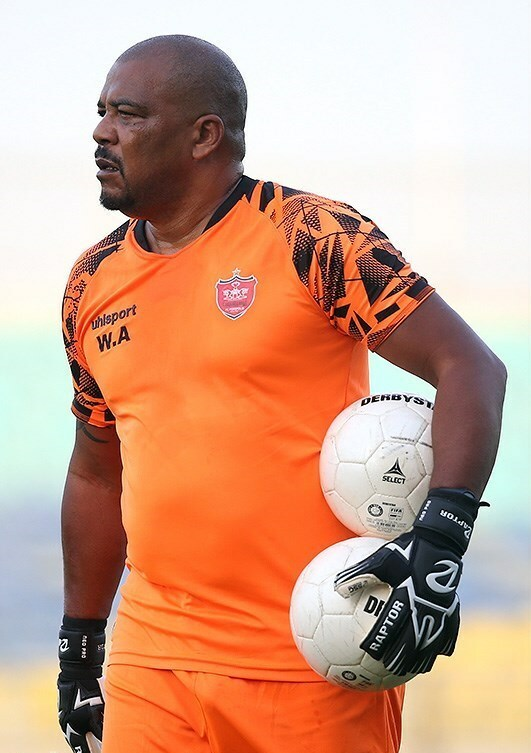

Personal information
- Full name: Welesley Antonio Simplicio
- Date of birth: 4 March 1967 (age 59)
- Place of birth: Goiânia, Brazil

Team information
- Current team: Persepolis(goalkeeping coach)

Youth career
- 1985–86: Flamengo

Senior career*
Years	Team	Apps	(Gls)
1989	Americano	15	(0)
1990–91	Flamengo	14	(0)
1991	América	15	(0)
1992	Madureira	20	(0)
1993	Guarani	8	(0)
1994–97	América SP	82	(0)
1995	→Portuguesa (loan)	25	(0)
1997	Sãocarlense	9	(0)
1998–99	Pelotas	20	(0)
1999	Bragantino	19	(0)
2000–01	Noroeste	18	(0)

Managerial career
- 2002: Santos (goalkeeping coach)
- 2002: Goiatuba (goalkeeping coach)
- 2002: Caldas CF (goalkeeping coach)
- 2003–2012: Al-Arabi (goalkeeping coach)
- 2013–2015: Al-Rayyan (goalkeeping coach)
- 2016: Qatar (goalkeeping coach)
- 2016–2022: Al-Rayyan (goalkeeping coach)
- 2022–2024: Persepolis (goalkeeping coach)
- 2024–: Al-Rayyan (goalkeeping coach)
- * Club domestic league appearances and goals

Welesley Antonio Simplicio known as Neneca (born March 4, 1967) is a retired Brazilian football goalkeeper who is currently goalkeeping manager the Persian Gulf Pro League club Persepolis.

== Managerial career ==
=== Persepolis ===
In June 2022, Neneca named as goalkeeping coach of Iranian giants Persepolis. He replaced Davoud Fanaei in the team.

== Honours ==
=== Player ===
Flamengo

- Copa Rio Sub-20: 1985
- Campeonato Carioca de Futebol Sub-20: 1985, 1986
- Taça Belo Horizonte de Juniores: 1986
- Copa do Brasil: 1990
- Copa Rio: 1991
- Campeonato Carioca: 1991

=== Manager ===
Persepolis

- Persian Gulf Pro League: 2022–23
- Hazfi Cup: 2022–23
- Iranian Super Cup: 2023
