= Mohammad Mehdi Ahmadi =

Iranian footballer

Personal information
- Full name: Mohammad Mehdi Ahmadi
- Date of birth: January 10, 2001 (age 25)
- Place of birth: Azandarian, Malayer, Iran
- Height: 1.80 m (5 ft 11 in)
- Positions: Left back; left winger

Team information
- Current team: Esteghlal Khuzestan
- Number: 77

Youth career
- 2018–2019: Iran Mehr academy
- 2019: Persian Iranian
- 2019–2020: Ehsan Kivaj

Senior career*
| Years | Team | Apps | (Gls) |
| 2019–2020 | Shohadaye Kivaj | | |
| 2020–2022 | Naft Masjed Soleyman | 52 | (0) |
| 2022–2024 | Persepolis | 4 | (0) |
| 2023 | → Naft MIS (loan) | 11 | (0) |
| 2024–2025 | Chadormalou | 19 | (0) |
| 2025– | Esteghlal Khuzestan | 34 | (0) |

International career^{‡}
- Iran U20
| 2022– | Iran U23 | 5 | (0) |
- * Club domestic league appearances and goals as of 1 January 2024 ‡ National team caps and goals as of 30 June 2023

Mohammad Mehdi Ahmadi (Persian: محمدمهدی احمدی) is an Iranian football left back who currently plays for Esteghlal Khuzestan in the Persian Gulf Pro League.

== Club career ==
=== Persepolis ===
On June 12, 2022; Ahmadi joined Persepolis with a 3-year contract.

== Club career statistics ==
As of 26 April 2024

| Club | Division | Season | League | | Hazfi Cup | | Asia | | Other | | Total | |
| Club | Division | Season | Apps | Goals | Apps | Goals | Apps | Goals | Apps | Goals | Apps | Goals |
|---|---|---|---|---|---|---|---|---|---|---|---|---|
| Shohadaye Kivaj | ? | 2019–20 | Unknown | | Unknown | | – | | — | | Unknown | |
| Shohadaye Kivaj | Total | | ? | ? | ? | ? | ? | ? | — | | ? | ? |
| Naft MIS | Pro League | 2020–21 | 27 | 0 | 1 | 0 | — | | — | | 28 | 0 |
| Naft MIS | Pro League | 2021–22 | 24 | 0 | 1 | 0 | — | | — | | 25 | 0 |
| Naft MIS | Total | | 51 | 0 | 2 | 0 | — | | — | | 53 | 0 |
| Persepolis | Pro League | 2022–23 | 1 | 0 | 0 | 0 | — | | — | | 1 | 0 |
| Persepolis | Pro League | 2023–24 | 3 | 0 | 1 | 0 | 1 | 0 | — | | 5 | 0 |
| Persepolis | Total | | 4 | 0 | 1 | 0 | 1 | 0 | 0 | 0 | 6 | 0 |
| Naft MIS (loan) | Pro League | 2022–23 | 11 | 0 | 0 | 0 | — | | — | | 11 | 0 |
| Naft MIS (loan) | Total | | 11 | 0 | 0 | 0 | — | | — | | 11 | 0 |
| Career Total | | | 66 | 0 | 3 | 0 | 1 | 0 | 0 | 0 | 70 | 0 |
