= Shahid Kazemi Stadium =

Football stadium in Tehran, Iran

Coordinates: 35.61211°N 51.357638°E

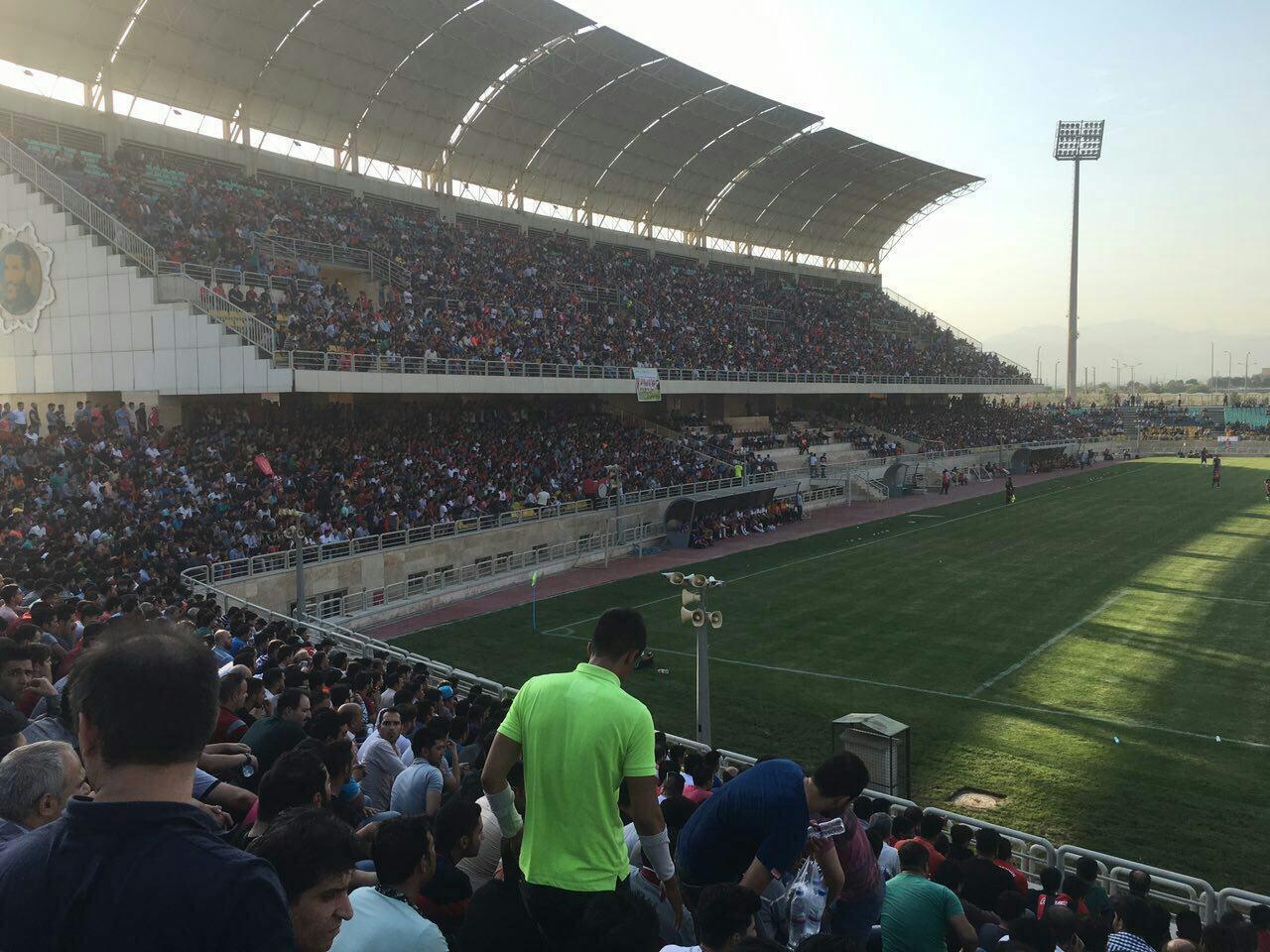
- Interactive map of Shahid Kazemi Stadium
- Full name: Shahid Kazemi Sport Complex
- Address: Azadegan Expressway, Kazemi Expressway Intersection
- Location: South Tehran; District 19; Tehran
- Owner: Persepolis AC Club
- Operator: Persepolis AC Club
- Capacity: 15,000
- Surface: Natural grass
- Record attendance: 12,000; Persepolis vs. Khooneh Be Khooneh (Friendly, 19 July 2016)

Construction
- Opened: 2013

Tenants
- Persepolis; Persepolis (Women)

Shahid Kazemi Stadium (Persian: ورزشگاه شهید کاظمی) is a football stadium in Tehran, Iran. It is the home stadium of Persepolis F.C. The stadium, which holds 15,000 people, was opened in 2013. Inside the complex, there are training areas. There are also a sauna, steam and weight rooms, a restaurant, conference rooms and offices.

== Record of Results ==
=== Persepolis ===
Persepolis's complete competitive record at Kazemi Stadium is as follows:

| Competition | P | W | D | L | F | A | Win % |
|---|---|---|---|---|---|---|---|
| League | 0 | 0 | 0 | 0 | 0 | 0 | 0% |
| Hazfi Cup | 0 | 0 | 0 | 0 | 0 | 0 | 0% |
| Asia | 0 | 0 | 0 | 0 | 0 | 0 | 0% |
| Total | 0 | 0 | 0 | 0 | 0 | 0 | 0% |

== See also ==
- Persepolis F.C.
- Derafshifar Stadium
