= Takhti Stadium (Jam) =

Sports venue in Jam, Iran

Coordinates: 27.82091°N 52.33676°E

Takhti Jam
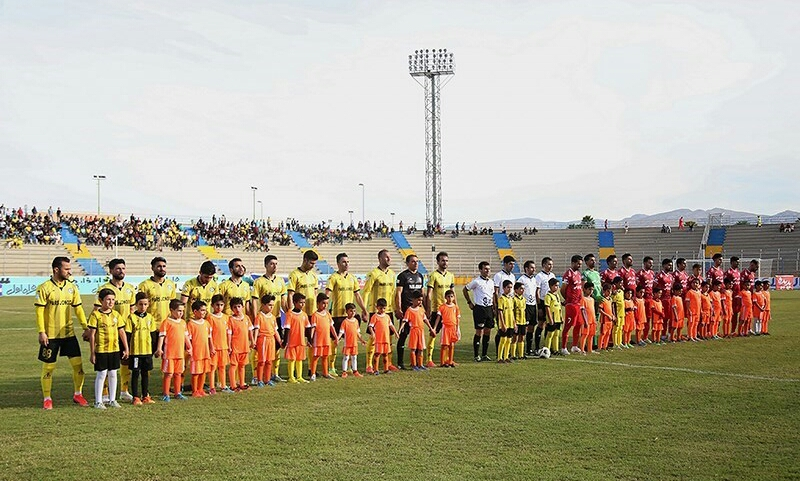
- Interactive map of Takhti Jam
- Full name: Takhti Jam Stadium
- Location: Jam, Iran
- Owner: PSEEZ
- Operator: PSEEZ
- Capacity: 15,000
- Field size: 105 m × 68 m (344 ft × 223 ft)

Tenant
- Pars Jonoubi Jam (2010–present)

Takhti Jam is a multi-purpose stadium, located in Jam, Iran. It is used mostly for football matches. The stadium can accommodate 15,000 spectators. Takhti Jam is the home stadium of Pars Jonoubi Jam. It is owned by the PSEEZ (Pars Special Energy Economic Zone).
