= Morteza Pouraliganji =

Iranian footballer (born 1992)

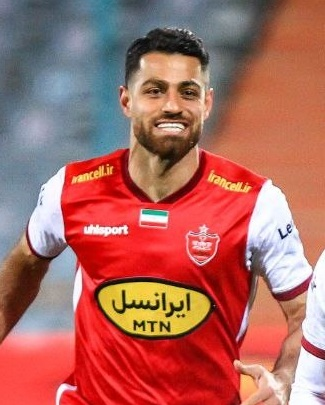
- Pouraliganji with Persepolis in 2023

Personal information
- Full name: Morteza Pouraliganji
- Date of birth: 19 April 1992 (age 34)
- Place of birth: Babol, Iran
- Height: 1.85 m (6 ft 1 in)
- Position: Centre-back

Team information
- Current team: Pakhtakor
- Number: 5

Youth career
- 2005–2007: Paykan Babol
- 2007–2008: Pas Tehran
- 2008–2010: Eshan Rey
- 2010–2013: Naft Tehran

Senior career*
Years	Team	Apps	(Gls)
2010–2015	Naft Tehran	74	(2)
2015	Tianjin Teda	26	(2)
2016–2018	Al Sadd	48	(9)
2018–2019	Eupen	6	(2)
2019–2020	Al-Arabi	22	(2)
2020–2022	Shenzhen FC	13	(1)
2022–2026	Persepolis	65	(1)
2026–	Pakhtakor	4	(0)

International career^{‡}
2009	Iran U17	4	(0)
2010	Iran U20	2	(0)
2012–2014	Iran U23	14	(2)
2015–2023	Iran	54	(3)
Medal record
Representing Iran
CAFA Nations Cup
Winner	2023 Kyrgyzstan – Uzbekistan	Team
- * Club domestic league appearances and goals as of 20 February 2026 ‡ National team caps and goals as of 17 October 2023

Morteza Pouraliganji (Persian: مرتضی پورعلی‌گنجی; born 19 April 1992) is an Iranian professional footballer who plays as a centre-back for Uzbekistan Super League club Pakhtakor and Iran national team.

He represented Iran at the 2015 AFC Asian Cup, 2018 FIFA World Cup and the 2019 AFC Asian Cup.

== Early life ==
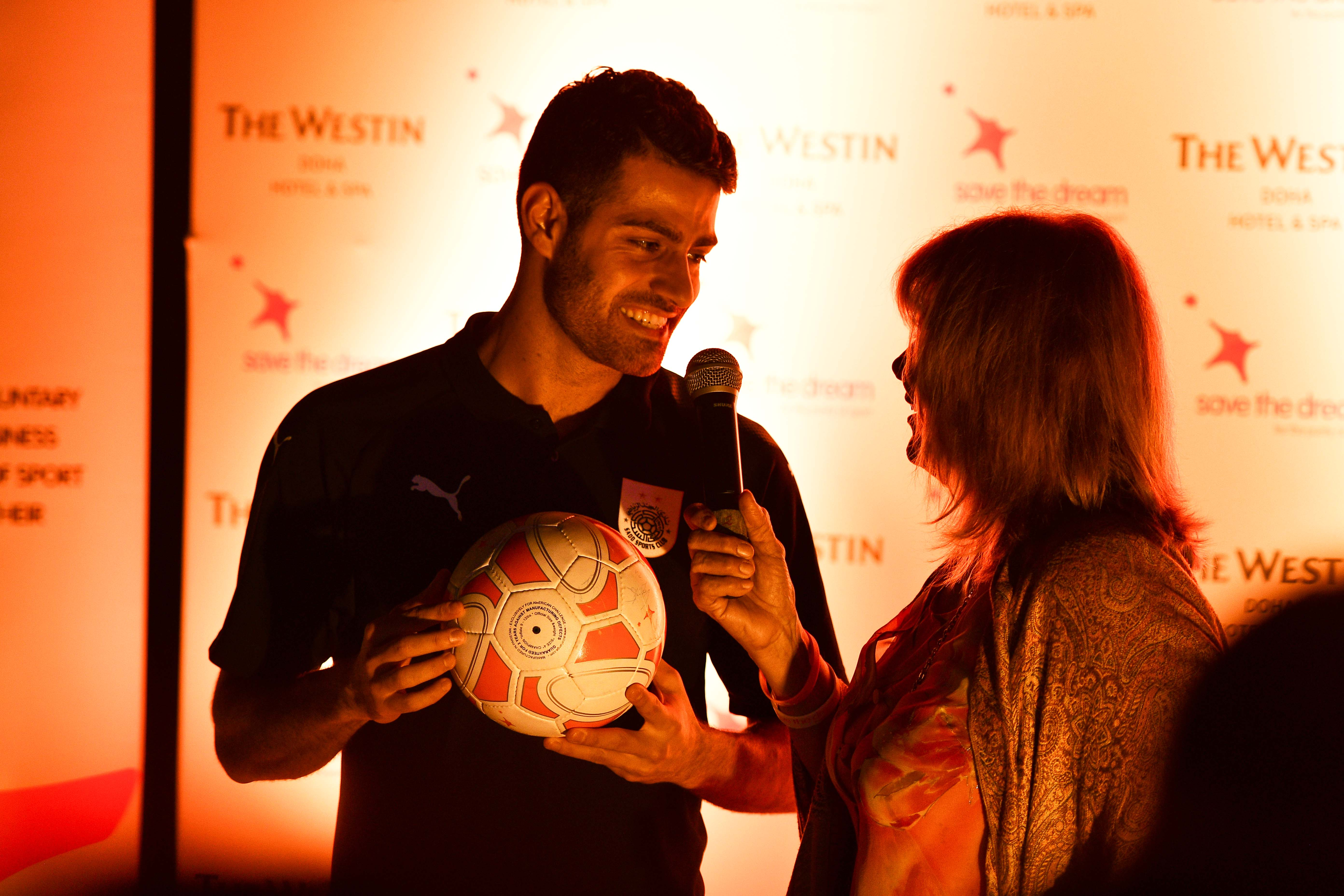
Pouraliganji at Universal Children's Day 2017

Pouraliganji was born in Pain Ganj Afruz, a village in Babol County.

== Club career ==
=== Naft Tehran ===
Pouraliganji started his senior career with Naft Tehran in 2010. He scored his first professional goal in 2011 in a 4–1 win against Paykan.

=== Tianjin Teda ===
He joined Chinese Super League club Tianjin Teda on 25 February 2015 with a one–year contract. He made his first appearance for the club on 8 April 2015 in a match against Henan Jianye. On 4 June 2015 Pouraliganji scored his first goal for Tianjin in a 2–2 draw against Guangzhou Evergrande. He left the club at the end of the season after he decided not to renew his contract.

=== Al Sadd ===
On 8 January 2016 Pouraliganji rejected several offers from European and Chinese teams and accepted an offer from Qatar Stars League club Al Sadd. He said that playing with Xavi was one of the main reasons he accepted this offer. He signed a four-month contract on 20 January 2016 until the end of the season. He scored his first goal for his new club in February 2016 in a 3–1 victory against Al Arabi.

Pouralingaji decided to remain with Al Sadd for another season and he scored his first league goal of the 2016–17 season on 12 December 2016 in an 8–0 win against Umm Salal. He scored again in the following match day on 16 December 2016 in a 3–1 victory against Al-Sailiya SC.

=== Persepolis ===
On 6 June 2022, Pouraliganji joined Persian Gulf Pro League side Persepolis on a two-year deal.

== International career ==
=== Youth ===
Pouraliganji represented Iran U-17 in the 2009 FIFA U-17 World Cup.

In 2012, he broke in to coach Ali Reza Mansourian's squad and has been a regular feature ever since. He was named in the Iran U23 final list for Incheon 2014.

=== Senior ===
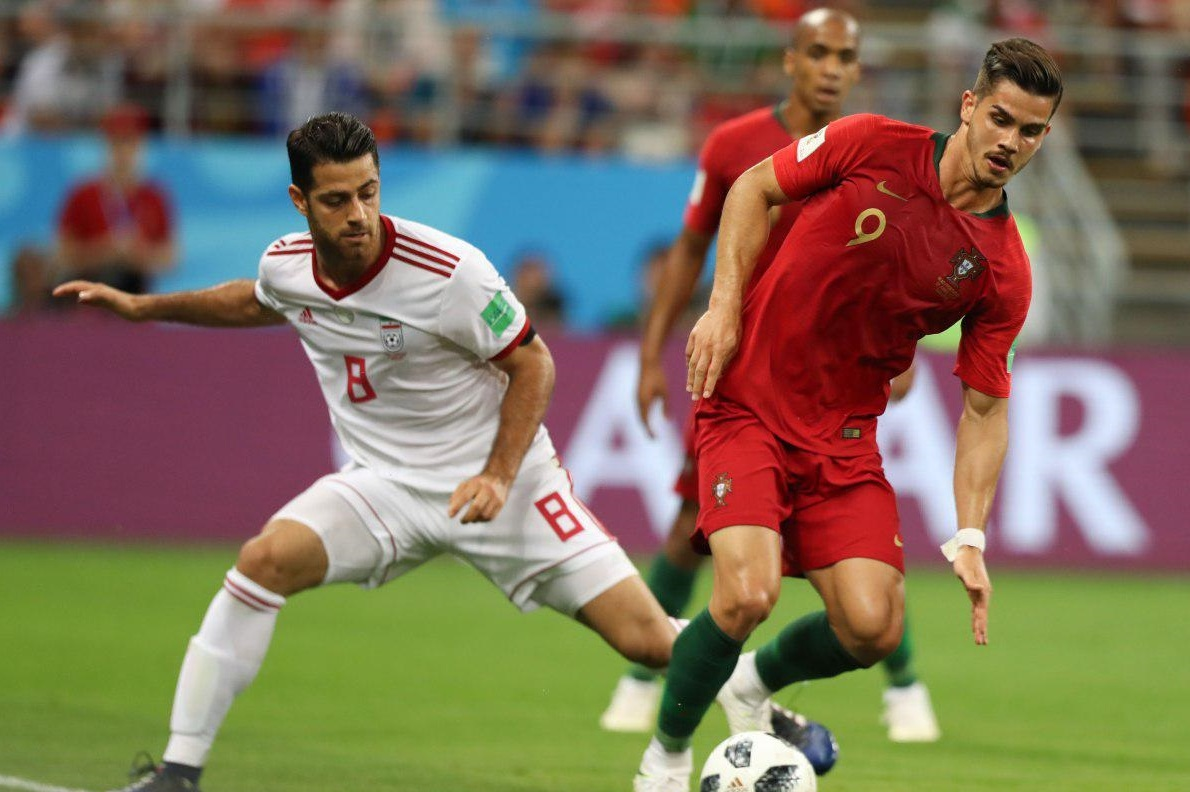
Pouraliganji playing for Iran against Portugal in the 2018 FIFA World Cup

After his performance in Asian Games in October 2014, Carlos Queiroz called Pouraliganji up for a training camp in Portugal. He played a friendly fixtures against Estroli and Benfica and was later called up for an international friendly against South Korea on 18 November 2014. He was called into Iran's 2015 AFC Asian Cup squad on 30 December 2014, making his debut in a friendly match against Iraq on 4 January 2015 which Iran won 1–0.

Pouraliganji was selected to start in Iran's opening match at the 2015 AFC Asian Cup, a 2–0 win over Bahrain. His good performance in Iran's second match against Qatar earned him a place in the AFC Best 11 of Round 2. In the quarter-final match against Iraq, Pouraliganji scored his first goal for Iran as they drew 3–3 at Canberra Stadium and were eventually defeated 7–6 on a penalty shootout.

In May 2018 he was named in Iran's preliminary squad for the 2018 FIFA World Cup in Russia.

== Career statistics ==
=== Club ===
As of 14 September 2026

Club	Season	Division	League		National Cup		Continental		Other		Total	
Club	Season	Division	Apps	Goals	Apps	Goals	Apps	Goals	Apps	Goals	Apps	Goals
Naft Tehran	2010–11	Pro League	12	2	0	0	–		–		12	2
Naft Tehran	2011–12	Pro League	16	0	1	0	–		–		17	0
Naft Tehran	2012–13	Pro League	11	0	0	0	–		–		11	0
Naft Tehran	2013–14	Pro League	21	0	1	0	–		–		22	0
Naft Tehran	2014–15	Pro League	14	0	2	1	1	0	–		17	1
Naft Tehran	Total		74	2	4	1	1	0	0	0	79	3
Tianjin Teda	2015	CSL	26	2	1	0	–		–		27	2
Al Sadd	2015–16	QSL	8	2	0	0	1	0	0	0	9	2
Al Sadd	2016–17	QSL	23	4	0	0	1	0	0	0	24	4
Al Sadd	2017–18	QSL	17	3	0	0	6	0	2 (Note: Appearances in Qatar Cup)	0	25	3
Al Sadd	Total		48	9	0	0	8	0	2	0	59	9
K.A.S. Eupen	2018–19	Belgian First Division A	6	2	1	0	–		–		7	2
Al-Arabi	2018–19	QSL	7	1	0	0	–		0	0	7	1
Al-Arabi	2019–20	QSL	15	1	0	0	–		0	0	15	1
Al-Arabi	Total		22	2	0	0	0	0	0	0	22	2
Shenzhen FC	2020	CSL	6	1	0	0	–		–		6	1
Shenzhen FC	2021	CSL	7	0	0	0	–		–		7	0
Shenzhen FC	Total		13	1	0	0	0	0	0	0	13	1
Persepolis	2022–23	Pro League	25	0	5	1	—		—		30	1
Persepolis	2023–24	Pro League	5	1	0	0	2	0	—		7	1
Persepolis	2024–25	Pro League	22	0	2	0	4	0	0	0	28	0
Persepolis	2025–26	Pro League	13	0	1	0	—		1	0	15	0
Persepolis	Total		65	1	8	1	6	0	1	0	80	2
Pakhtakor	2026	USL	2	0	0	0	1	0	—		3	0
Career total			256	19	14	2	16	0	3	0	289	21

=== International ===
Statistics accurate as of match played 17 October 2023 .

Iran
Year	Apps	Goals
2015	10	2
2016	6	0
2017	9	0
2018	7	0
2019	9	0
2020	1	0
2021	2	1
2022	5	0
2023	5	0
Total	54	3

=== International goals ===
Scores and results list Iran's goal tally first.

=== Iran U23 ===
No.	Date	Venue	Opponent	Score	Result	Competition
1.	18 September 2014	Munhak Stadium, Incheon, South Korea	Kyrgyzstan	1–0	1–1	2014 Asian Games

=== Iran ===
#	Date	Venue	Opponent	Score	Result	Competition
1.	23 January 2015	Canberra Stadium, Canberra, Australia	Iraq	2–2	3–3	2015 AFC Asian Cup
2.	12 November 2015	Azadi Stadium, Tehran, Iran	Turkmenistan	1–0	3–1	2018 FIFA World Cup qualification
3.	11 June 2021	Bahrain National Stadium, Riffa, Bahrain	Cambodia	6–0	10–0	2022 FIFA World Cup qualification

== Honours ==
=== Club ===
Al-Sadd

- Qatar Crown Prince Cup: 2017
- Qatar Emir Cup: 2017
- Sheikh Jassim Cup: 2017

Persepolis

- Persian Gulf Pro League: (2) 2022–23, 2023–24
- Hazfi Cup: 2022–23
- Iranian Super Cup: 2023
