= Mohammad Omri =

Iranian football player

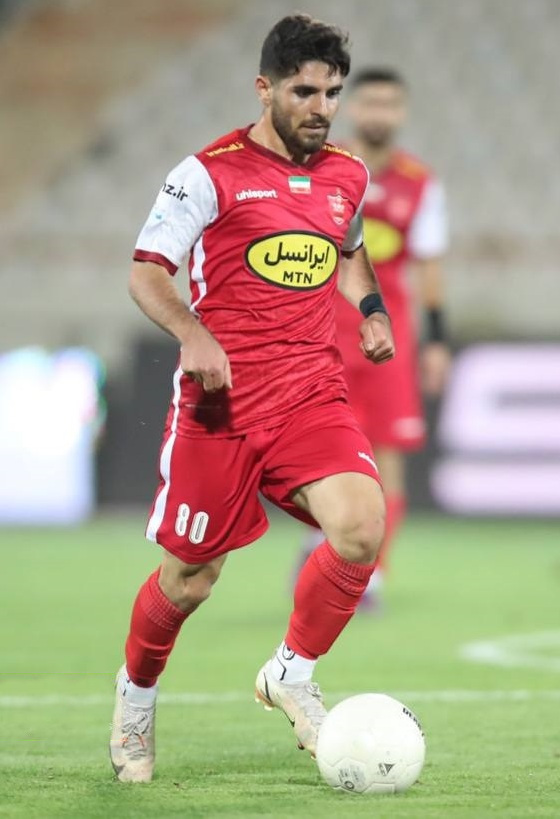
- Omri playing for Persepolis in 2022

Personal information
- Date of birth: 11 March 2000 (age 26)
- Place of birth: Urmia, Iran
- Height: 1.73 m (5 ft 8 in)
- Position: Winger

Team information
- Current team: Persepolis
- Number: 7

Youth career
- 2018–2021: Persepolis

Senior career*
Years	Team	Apps	(Gls)
2021–	Persepolis	62	(7)
2024–2025	→ Malavan (loan)	37	(3)

International career
2023	Iran U23	2	(1)
- * Club domestic league appearances and goals as of 20 November 2026

Mohammad Omri (Persian: محمد عمری; born 11 March 2000) is an Iranian professional footballer who plays as a winger for Persian Gulf Pro League club Persepolis.

== Early life ==
Mohammad Omri was born on 11 March 2000 in Urmia, West Azerbaijan Province, Iran. He's a Kurdish. Omri grew up in a football-loving family and began playing the sport at a young age in local teams in Urmia. His early exposure to football in his hometown laid the foundation for his professional career. As of the latest reports, Omri is unmarried and keeps his personal life private, focusing primarily on his football career. In interviews, he has expressed admiration for his family's support and his ambition to represent Iran on the international stage while pursuing opportunities in European leagues.

== Club career ==
=== Persepolis ===
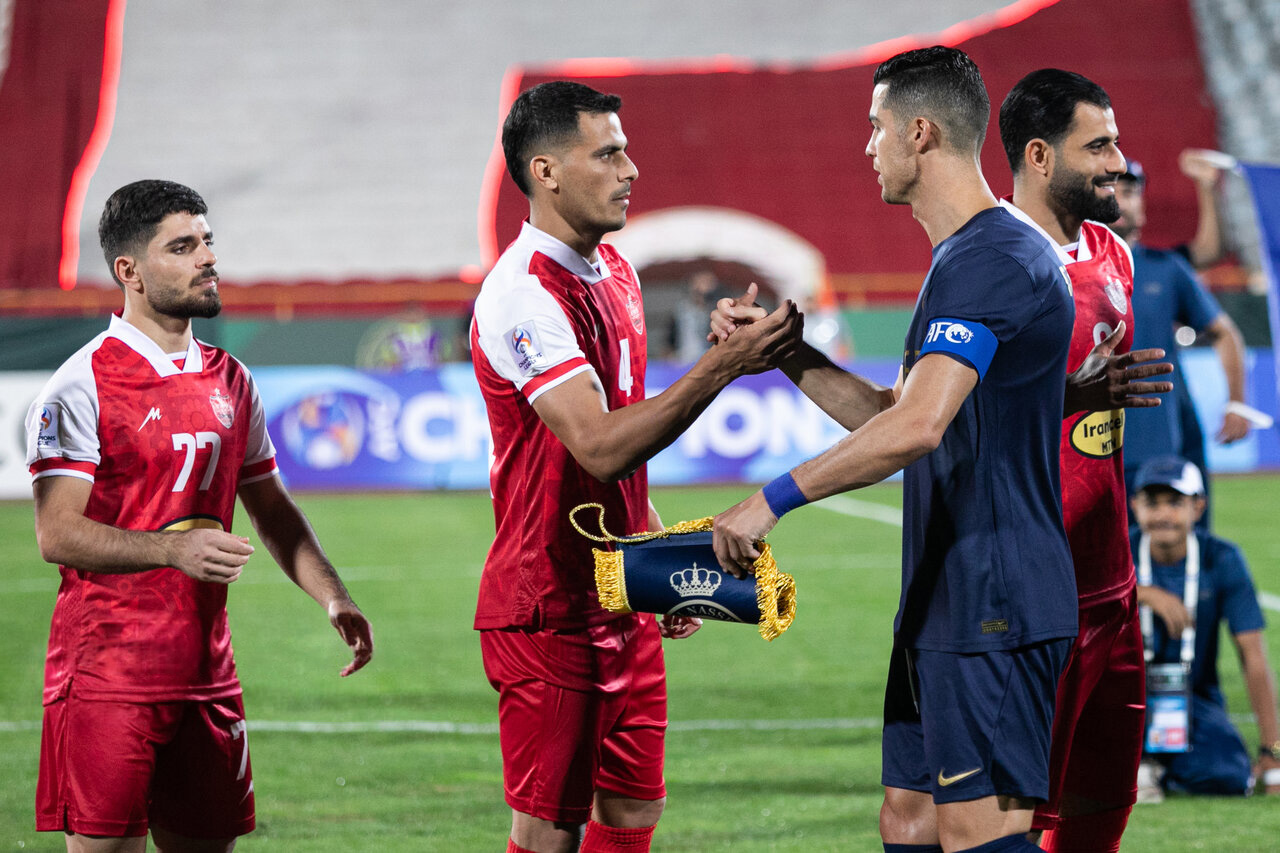
Omri (left) before a match against Al Nassr in 2023

Mohammad Omri was born in Urmia . He started his football career at Persepolis Club Academy.

In 2021, with the opinion of head coach Yahya Golmohammadi, Omri was added to the training sessions of the Persepolis adult team due to his brilliance in the Persepolis B team and being in the Top goalscorer Premier Youth League's course.

On January 13, 2022; He made his senior debut in a 1–0 home win over Fajrspasi in the league. Where in the 81st minute, he played as a substitute instead of Siamak Nemati.

On February 21, 2022; due to the satisfaction of the Coaching staff with his performance, with the official announcement of the Persepolis club website, his contract with the club was extended for 5 years until 2027.

=== Malavan (loan) ===
On 7 February 2024, Omri signed a contract with Persian Gulf Pro League side Malavan Anzali. He helped the team in many important matches and was one of the key players of the club.

== Player profile ==
=== Style of play ===
Mohammad Omri is known for his versatility and dynamic presence on the pitch, primarily operating as a winger but capable of playing as a false nine or attacking midfielder. A right-footed player, he combines technical finesse with explosive pace, making him a constant threat in attacking transitions. His dribbling ability allows him to navigate tight spaces and take on defenders, often creating scoring opportunities for himself or his teammates. Omri's high work rate and relentless pressing are notable, contributing to both offensive and defensive phases of play.

His vision and precise passing enable him to deliver key passes and link up effectively with forwards, while his knack for positioning allows him to exploit gaps in opposition defenses. During his time at Persepolis and later at Malavan, Omri demonstrated a flair for long-range shots and clinical finishing, as evidenced by his standout performances, including a memorable goal against Gol Gohar in the 2022–23 Persian Gulf Pro League season. While he draws inspiration from players like Lionel Messi and Neymar, Omri has expressed a desire to carve out a unique playing style, blending creativity with tactical discipline.

== Career statistics ==
As of 20 November 2026

Club	Division	Season	League		Cup		Asia		Other		Total	
Club	Division	Season	Apps	Goals	Apps	Goals	Apps	Goals	Apps	Goals	Apps	Goals
Persepolis	Pro League	2021–22	3	0	1	0	—		—		4	0
Persepolis	Pro League	2022–23	26	4	4	0	—		—		30	4
Persepolis	Pro League	2023–24	14	1	0	0	5	0	—		19	1
Persepolis	Pro League	2025–26	10	1	1	0	—		1	0	12	1
Persepolis	Pro League	2026–27	9	1	0	0	—		—		9	1
Persepolis	Total		62	7	6	0	5	0	1	0	74	7
Malavan (loan)	Pro League	2023–24	14	1	3	1	—		—		17	2
Malavan (loan)	Pro League	2024–25	23	2	5	2	—		—		28	4
Malavan (loan)	Total		37	3	8	3	—		—		45	6
Career totals			99	10	14	3	5	0	1	0	119	13

== Honours ==
Persepolis

- Persian Gulf Pro League (2): 2022–23, 2023–24
- Hazfi Cup (1): 2022–23
- Iranian Super Cup (1): 2023
