= Mostafa Naeijpour =

Iranian footballer (born 1993)

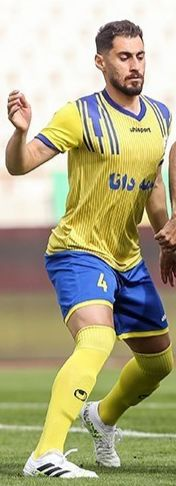

Personal information
- Full name: Mostafa Naeijpour
- Date of birth: March 23, 1993 (age 33)
- Place of birth: Nowshahr, Iran
- Position: Defender

Team information
- Current team: Naft Masjed Soleyman
- Number: 4

Youth career
- –2017: Saipa

Senior career*
Years	Team	Apps	(Gls)
2017–2020	Saipa	18	(0)
2020–	Naft Masjed Soleyman	22	(1)
- * Club domestic league appearances and goals

Mostafa Naeijpour (Persian: مصطفي نائيج‌پور; born March 23, 1993) is an Iranian footballer who plays as a defender who currently plays for Iranian club Naft Masjed Soleyman in the Persian Gulf Pro League.

== Club career ==
=== Saipa ===
He made his debut for Saipa in 12th fixtures of 2017–18 Iran Pro League against Naft Tehran while he substituted in for Mohammad Abbaszadeh.
