= Iran National Football Camp =

Football training facility

Camp of Iran national football teams
- Iran National Football Camp
- Interactive map of Camp of Iran national football teams
- Address: Azadi Sport Complex
- Location: Tehran, Iran
- Coordinates: 35°43′33″N 51°15′52″E
- Operator: Iranian Football Federation
- Type: training facility
- Surface: Artificial grass
- Field size: 195 m × 80 m (640 ft × 262 ft)

Construction
- Opened: 2000

Tenants
- Iran national football team Iran B national football team Iran women's national football team Iran national under-23 football team Iran national under-20 football team Iran national under-17 football team

Iran National Football Camp (Persian: کمپ تیم‌های ملی فوتبال ایران), also known as Performance Elite Center (PEC), is an association football training facility in Tehran, Iran. Located in west of Azadi Sport Complex and operated by Iranian Football Federation, the camp is mostly used by Iran national football team.

The camp has a number of football fields, an indoor futsal pitch, a bodybuilding gym, classrooms, medical clinic, restaurant and dormitory. The main building of "Iran Football Academy", which operates Iran youth football teams is located inside the complex.
