= Sina Asadbeigi =

Iranian footballer

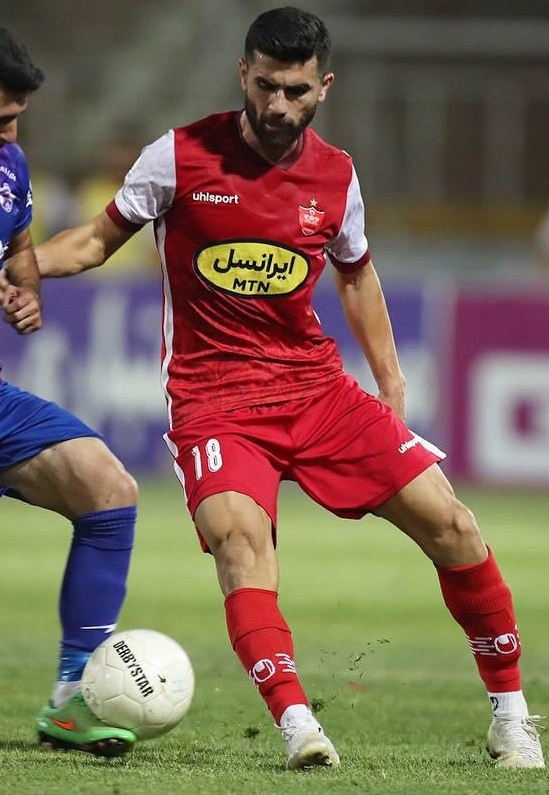
- Asadbeigi with Persepolis in 2022

Personal information
- Date of birth: 17 July 1997 (age 29)
- Place of birth: Sarpol-e Zahab, Iran
- Height: 1.82 m (6 ft 0 in)
- Position: Defensive midfielder

Team information
- Current team: Duhok
- Number: 88

Youth career
- –2015: Toohid Tehran
- 2015–2016: Persepolis
- 2016–2018: Paykan

Senior career*
Years	Team	Apps	(Gls)
2018–2019	Paykan	0	(0)
2019–2021	Havadar	14	(0)
2021–2022	Zob Ahan	35	(3)
2022–2024	Persepolis	46	(2)
2024–2026	Foolad	47	(1)
2026–	Duhok	5	(0)
- * Club domestic league appearances and goals as of 18 April 2025

Sina Asadbeigi (Persian: سینا اسدبیگی; born 17 July 1997) is an Iranian professional footballer who plays as a defensive midfielder for Duhok in the Iraqi Stars League.

== Career ==
=== Paykan ===
In the 2017–18 season, Asadbeigi joined Persian Gulf Pro League side Paykan.

=== Havadar ===
In the 2019–20 season, Asadbeigi joined Azadegan League side Havadar. He played in 14 matches for Havadar.

=== Zob Ahan ===
He made his debut for Zob Ahan in 18th fixtures of 2020–21 Persian Gulf Pro League against Paykan while he substituted in for Ghasem Haddadifar.

=== Persepolis ===
On 27 July 2022, Asadbeigi joined Persian Gulf Pro League side Persepolis on a three-year deal.

== Career statistics ==
As of 15 May 2025

Appearances and goals by club, season and competition
Club	Season	League			Hazfi Cup		Asia		Other		Total	
Club	Season	Division	Apps	Goals	Apps	Goals	Apps	Goals	Apps	Goals	Apps	Goals
Paykan	2018–19	Persian Gulf Pro League	0	0	0	0	–		–		0	0
Havadar	2019–20	Azadegan League	1	0	0	0	—		—		1	0
Havadar	2020–21	Azadegan League	13	0	1	0	—		—		14	0
Havadar	Total		14	0	1	0	0	0	0	0	15	0
Zob Ahan	2020–21	Persian Gulf Pro League	6	0	0	0	—		—		6	0
Zob Ahan	2021–22	Persian Gulf Pro League	29	3	3	0	—		—		32	3
Zob Ahan	Total		35	3	3	0	0	0	0	0	38	3
Persepolis	2022–23	Persian Gulf Pro League	26	2	5	0	–		–		31	2
Persepolis	2023–24	Persian Gulf Pro League	18	0	2	1	4	0	0	0	24	1
Persepolis	2024–25	Persian Gulf Pro League	2	0	0	0	0	0	0	0	2	0
Persepolis	Total		46	2	7	1	4	0	0	0	57	3
Foolad	2024–25	Persian Gulf Pro League	28	1	1	0	–		–		29	1
Foolad	2025–26	Persian Gulf Pro League	0	0	0	0	—		—		0	0
Foolad	Total		28	1	1	0	0	0	0	0	29	1
Career total			123	6	12	1	4	0	0	0	139	7

== Honours ==
Persepolis

- Persian Gulf Pro League: 2022–23, 2023–24
- Hazfi Cup: 2022–23
- Iranian Super Cup: 2023
