= Alireza Babaei =

Iranian football player

Personal information
- Date of birth: 12 June 2003 (age 23)
- Place of birth: Iran
- Position: Centre-back

Team information
- Current team: Persepolis
- Number: 37

Youth career
- 2022–2023: Persepolis B

Senior career*
| Years | Team | Apps | (Gls) |
| 2023– | Persepolis | 3 | (0) |
- * Club domestic league appearances and goals as of 1 January 2024

Alireza Babaei (Persian: علیرضا بابایی;born on June 22, 2003) is an Iranian professional footballer who plays as a defender for Persian Gulf Pro League club Persepolis

== Club career ==
=== Persepolis ===
Alireza Babaei In July 2022, he joined the Club Academy and was added to the Persepolis senior team in the mid-season transfer.

Alireza Babaei's first game was against the Foolad football team in week 17 of the Persian Gulf Pro League and he entered the field in the last 15 minutes of the game.

== Career statistics ==
As of 01 January 2024

| Club performance | | | League | | Cup | | Continental | | Total | |
| Season | Club | League | Apps | Goals | Apps | Goals | Apps | Goals | Apps | Goals |
| Iran | | | League | | Hazfi Cup | | Asia | | Total | |
|---|---|---|---|---|---|---|---|---|---|---|
| 2022–23 | Persepolis | Pro League | 1 | 0 | 0 | 0 | — | | 1 | 0 |
| 2023–24 | Persepolis | Pro League | 2 | 0 | 0 | 0 | 0 | 0 | 2 | 0 |
| Career total | | | 3 | 0 | 0 | 0 | 0 | 0 | 3 | 0 |

== Honours ==
Persepolis

- Persian Gulf Pro League: (2) 2022–23, 2023–24
- Hazfi Cup: 2022–23
- Iranian Super Cup: 2023
