= Jam, Iran =

City in Bushehr province, Iran

Jam Persian: جم
- City
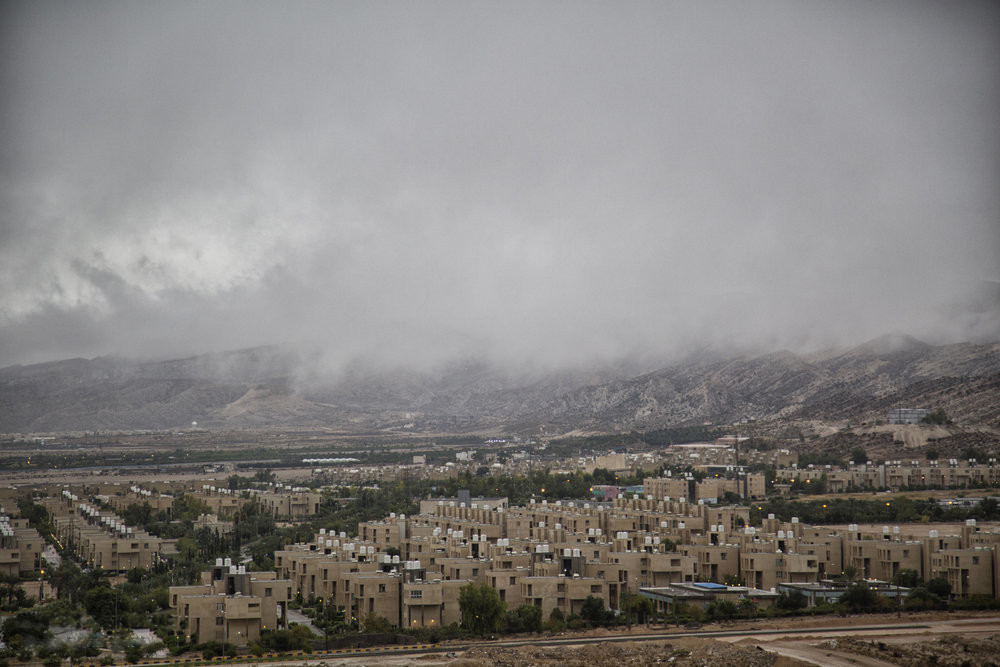
- The city of Jam

- Location within Iran
- Coordinates: 27°49′16″N 52°19′50″E
- Country: Iran
- Province: Bushehr
- County: Jam
- District: Central
- Established as a city: 1996

Population (2016)
  - Total: 31,436
- Time zone: UTC+3:30 (IRST)

Jam (Persian: جم) (Note: Also romanized as Jamm; also known as Jām-e Jam; formerly the village of Velayat (ولایت)) is a city in the Central District of Jam County, Bushehr province, Iran, serving as capital of both the county and the district. It is also the administrative center for Jam Rural District. The village of Velayat was converted to a city in 1996 and renamed Jam in 1999.

== Demographics ==
=== Population ===
At the time of the 2006 National Census, the city's population was 10,809 in 2,734 households. The 2011 census counted 16,313 people in 4,632 households. The 2016 census measured the population of the city as 31,436 people in 9,356 households.

== Neighborhoods ==
The city of Jam is formed from the former villages of Khvajeh Ahmadi (خواجه احمدي), Malecheh (مالچه), Qaleh-ye Kohneh (قلعه کهنه), and Velayat (ولایت).

== Climate ==
Climate data for Jam (1989-2005)
Month	Jan	Feb	Mar	Apr	May	Jun	Jul	Aug	Sep	Oct	Nov	Dec	Year
Mean daily maximum °C (°F)	16.9 (62.4)	19.4 (66.9)	23.3 (73.9)	30.2 (86.4)	36.8 (98.2)	40.3 (104.5)	40.3 (104.5)	39.4 (102.9)	36.7 (98.1)	32.7 (90.9)	25.5 (77.9)	20.0 (68.0)	30.1 (86.2)
Daily mean °C (°F)	12.0 (53.6)	13.8 (56.8)	17.1 (62.8)	23.2 (73.8)	29.4 (84.9)	32.6 (90.7)	33.6 (92.5)	32.8 (91.0)	29.7 (85.5)	25.6 (78.1)	19.1 (66.4)	14.6 (58.3)	23.6 (74.5)
Mean daily minimum °C (°F)	7.0 (44.6)	8.2 (46.8)	10.8 (51.4)	16.2 (61.2)	21.9 (71.4)	24.9 (76.8)	26.8 (80.2)	26.2 (79.2)	22.7 (72.9)	18.4 (65.1)	12.8 (55.0)	9.2 (48.6)	17.1 (62.8)
Average precipitation mm (inches)	148.3 (5.84)	41.6 (1.64)	43.9 (1.73)	7.1 (0.28)	1.7 (0.07)	0.0 (0.0)	0.1 (0.00)	0.1 (0.00)	1.6 (0.06)	2.3 (0.09)	26.1 (1.03)	124.3 (4.89)	397.1 (15.63)
Average precipitation days (≥ 0)	8.9	6.7	6.5	3.0	0.6	0	0.3	0.1	0.3	0.4	3.4	6.6	36.8
Average relative humidity (%)	68	59	50	36	25	24	32	38	39	38	49	63	43
Mean monthly sunshine hours	212.4	214.6	241.3	273.1	336.0	361.3	344.3	339.6	314.9	308.6	249.6	217.8	3,413.5
Source: IRIMO

== Sports ==
Jam's main sport team is Pars Jonubi Jam football club who used to play in the Azadegan League and now in Persian Gulf Pro League, Iranian Premier League.

== See also ==
Media related to Jam, Iran at Wikimedia Commons
