= Mahdi Torabi =

Iranian footballer (born 1994)

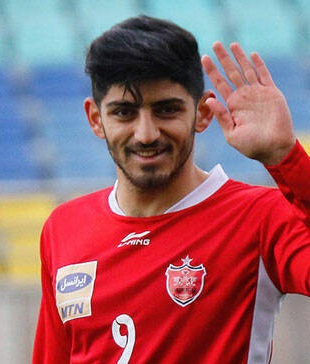

Personal information
- Date of birth: 10 September 1994 (age 32)
- Place of birth: Karaj, Alborz province, Iran
- Height: 1.80 m (5 ft 11 in)
- Position: Winger

Team information
- Current team: Tractor
- Number: 9

Youth career
- 2012–2015: Saipa

Senior career*
Years	Team	Apps	(Gls)
2012–2019	Saipa	118	(17)
2019–2020	Persepolis	40	(12)
2020–2021	Al-Arabi	9	(2)
2021–2024	Persepolis	97	(16)
2024–	Tractor	47	(3)

International career^{‡}
2015–2016	Iran U23	6	(1)
2015–	Iran	53	(7)
Medal record
Representing Iran
CAFA Nations Cup
Winner	2023 Kyrgyzstan – Uzbekistan	Team
- * Club domestic league appearances and goals as of 26 February 2026 ‡ National team caps and goals as of 21 June 2026

Mahdi Torabi (Note: Persian: مهدی ترابی) (born 10 September 1994) is an Iranian professional footballer who plays as a winger for Persian Gulf Pro League club Tractor and the Iran national team.

He began his career at Saipa, and then played for Persepolis between 2019 and 2020. He played for Qatari side Al-Arabi between 2020 and 2021, later rejoining Persepolis. He joined Tractor in 2024 and has been regarded as the club's fan favorite.

Torabi made his first senior appearance in 2015, and represented Iran at the FIFA World Cup in 2018 and 2022 and the AFC Asian Cup in 2019 and 2023.

== Early life and family ==
Mahdi Torabi was born on 10 September 1994 in Karaj, Alborz province, Iran into a religious Shia Muslim family. His father reportedly served as the commander of the Imam Sajjad base of the Basij in Alborz province.

Torabi studied business management from the Payame Noor University Eshtehard.

== Club career ==
=== Saipa ===
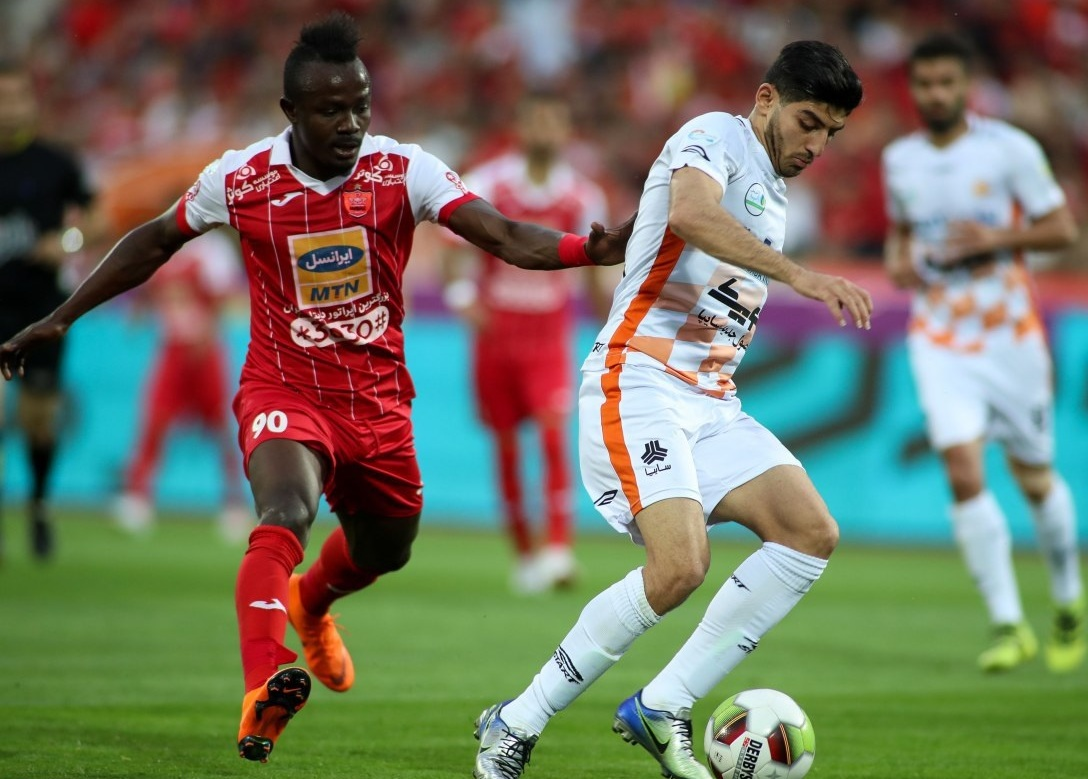
Torabi playing for Saipa against Persepolis in 2018

Torabi's career began with the Saipa youth squad. He was promoted to the first team by Mojtaba Taghavi in the summer of 2012. He made his debut in the 2013–14 Persian Gulf Cup season against Mes Kerman as a substitute for Kaveh Rezaei.

=== Persepolis ===
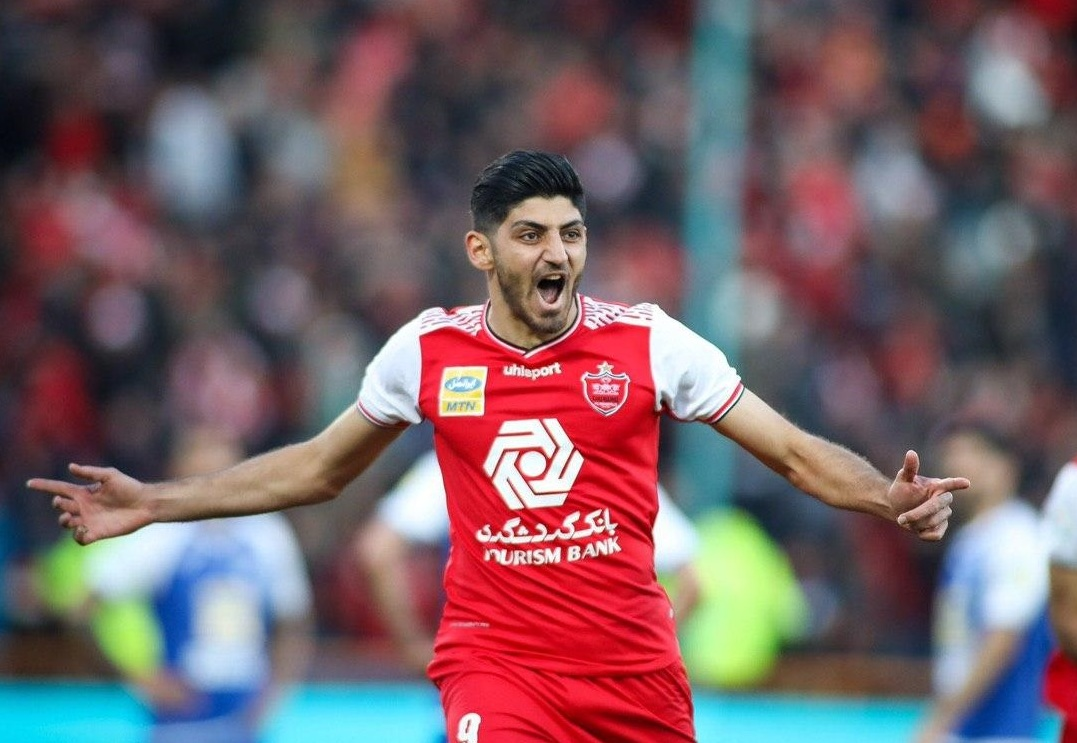
Torabi with Persepolis in 2020

On 1 July 2018, Torabi signed a three-year deal with Persepolis. He was sent on back on loan to Saipa for the first half of the season until Persepolis had served their transfer ban. On 16 December 2018, Torabi officially joined Persepolis' squad and was assigned the number 9.

Torabi scored his first goal for Persepolis in a 3–2 victory over Saipa on 13 April 2019.

=== Al-Arabi ===
In October 2020, Torabi joined Al-Arabi and played in the Qatar Stars League.

=== Return to Persepolis ===
In February 2021, he rejoined Persepolis to play in the Persian Gulf Pro League.

=== Tractor ===
In the summer of 2024, it was announced that he wanted to transfer to another team for more income but he himself said that he changed his team to improve his mental condition, not to earn money.

On 10 July 2024, Torabi joined Persian Gulf Pro League side Tractor.

== International career ==
=== Youth level ===
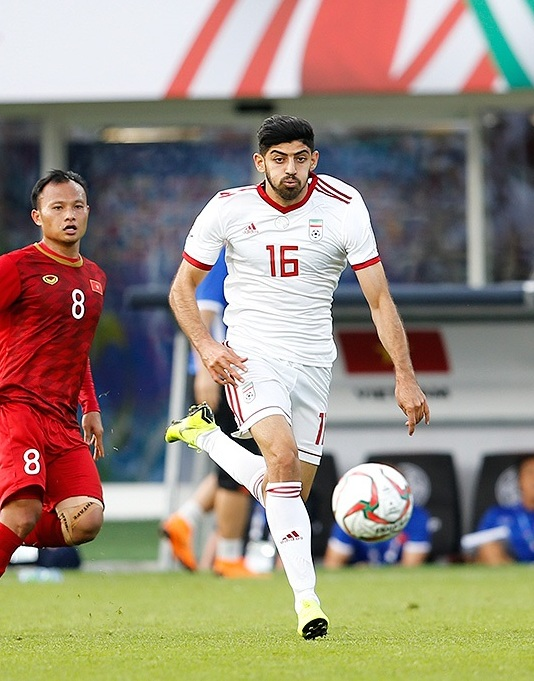
Torabi in the match between Vietnam and Iran at the 2019 AFC Asian Cup

He was invited to Iran U23 preliminary camp by Nelo Vingada. Torabi was included in the squad for the 2016 AFC U-23 Championship by coach Mohammad Khakpour and he scored his first goal of the tournament in the last group match against China from a 30-yard free kick.

=== Senior level ===
He made his debut against Uzbekistan in a friendly on 11 June 2015 where he scored the lone goal of the match. On 3 September 2015, Torabi came off the bench to score in a 6–0 victory against Guam. In May 2018 he was named in Iran's squad for the 2018 FIFA World Cup in Russia. In November 2022, Torabi was listed in Iran's squad for the 2022 FIFA World Cup. In May 2026, he was listed in Iran's squad for the 2026 FIFA World Cup. Following Iran's first match against New Zealand, Torabi's single-entry visa expired and generated considerable controversy. FFIRI subsequently negotiated with FIFA and a multi-entry visa was issued for Torabi.

== Personal life ==
=== Political views ===
Torabi is an ardent supporter of the government of the Islamic Republic of Iran and is known to have links with the Islamic Revolutionary Guards Corps (IRGC). In 2019, Torabi lifted his shirt up with a message of support to the government during the 2019–2020 Iranian protests as well. The literal translation of his message was "The only path to salvation of country is to follow orders of the leader". In 2022, Torabi wore a shirt in support of Supreme Leader Ali Khamenei and desired to offer him a football as a gift in the course of the Mahsa Amini protests.

During the 2026 Iran war, Torabi consistently made appearances on pro-government rallies in Tehran's Valiasr Square and described the assassinated Ali Khamenei as "love" and "martyred guide". He also stated that he would stand behind the leadership of Mojtaba Khamenei.

== Career statistics ==
=== Club ===
As of 14 April 2026

Club	Division	Season	League		Hazfi Cup		Asia		Other		Total	
Club	Division	Season	Apps	Goals	Apps	Goals	Apps	Goals	Apps	Goals	Apps	Goals
Saipa	Pro League	2012–13	1	0	0	0	–		–		1	0
Saipa	Pro League	2013–14	3	0	0	0	–		–		3	0
Saipa	Pro League	2014–15	23	1	1	0	–		–		24	1
Saipa	Pro League	2015–16	27	1	2	0	–		–		29	1
Saipa	Pro League	2016–17	19	4	2	0	–		–		21	4
Saipa	Pro League	2017–18	27	10	1	0	–		–		28	10
Saipa	Pro League	2018–19	14	1	2	3	–		–		16	4
Saipa	Total		114	17	8	3	—		—		122	20
Persepolis	Pro League	2018–19	14	1	3	0	6	1	—		23	2
Persepolis	Pro League	2019–20	26	11	4	1	2	0	—		32	12
Persepolis	Total		40	12	7	1	8	1	—		55	14
Al-Arabi	QSL	2020–21	9	2	2	0	—		1	0	12	2
Al-Arabi	Total		9	2	2	0	—		1	0	12	2
Persepolis	Pro League	2020–21	14	4	3	1	6	2	1	0	24	7
Persepolis	Pro League	2021–22	26	3	2	1	2	1	0	0	30	5
Persepolis	Pro League	2022–23	29	7	5	2	—		—		34	9
Persepolis	Pro League	2023–24	28	2	2	1	5	1	—		35	4
Persepolis	Total		97	16	12	5	13	4	1	0	123	25
Tractor	Pro League	2024–25	29	3	1	0	8	2	0	0	38	5
Tractor	Pro League	2025–26	18	0	1	1	6	1	1	0	26	2
Tractor	Total		47	3	2	1	14	3	1	0	64	7
Career totals			307	50	31	10	35	8	3	0	376	68

=== International ===
Statistics accurate as of match played 21 June 2026.

Iran
Year	Apps	Goals
2015	7	3
2016	4	1
2017	2	0
2018	10	2
2019	7	0
2021	3	0
2022	6	1
2023	6	0
2024	6	0
2026	2	0
Total	53	7

=== International goals ===
As of match played 30 May 2026. Iran score listed first, score column indicates score after each Torabi goal.

International goals by date, venue, cap, opponent, score, result and competition
No.	Date	Venue	Cap	Opponent	Score	Result	Competition
1.	11 June 2015	Bunyodkor Stadium, Tashkent, Uzbekistan	1	Uzbekistan	1–0	1–0	Friendly
2.	3 September 2015	Azadi Stadium, Tehran, Iran	3	Guam	6–0	6–0	2018 FIFA World Cup qualification
3.	13 October 2015	Azadi Stadium, Tehran, Iran	5	Japan	1–0	1–1	Friendly
4.	7 June 2016	Azadi Stadium, Tehran, Iran	10	Kyrgyzstan	3–0	6–0	Friendly
5.	11 September 2018	Bunyodkor Stadium, Tashkent, Uzbekistan	18	Uzbekistan	1–0	1–0	Friendly
6.	16 October 2018	Azadi Stadium, Tehran, Iran	19	Bolivia	2–1	2–1	Friendly
7.	10 November 2022	Azadi Stadium, Tehran, Iran	36	Nicaragua	1–0	1–0	Friendly

== Honours ==
=== Club ===
Persepolis

- Persian Gulf Pro League (5): 2018–19, 2019–20, 2020–21, 2022–23, 2023–24
- Hazfi Cup (2): 2018–19, 2022–23
- Iranian Super Cup (2): 2019, 2020

Tractor

- Persian Gulf Pro League: 2024–25
- Iranian Super Cup: 2025

=== Individual ===
- Iranian Young Player of the Year: 2016
- Persian Gulf Pro League Team of the Year: 2015–16
- Navad Player of the Month: April 2018, May 2018
