= Ahmad Gohari =

Iranian association football player

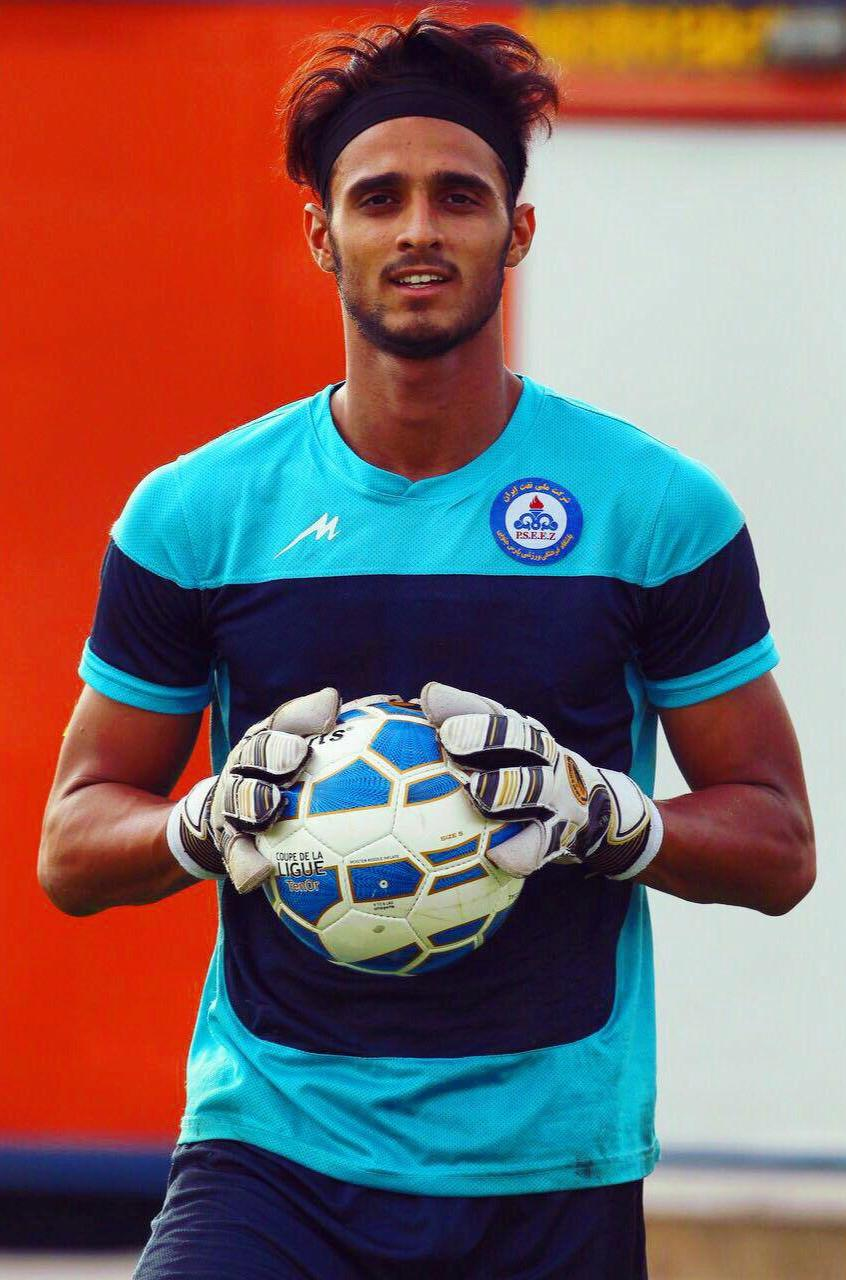
- Gohari in Pars Jonoubi Jam training 2017

Personal information
- Date of birth: 12 January 1996 (age 30)
- Place of birth: Kabudarahang, Iran
- Height: 1.88 m (6 ft 2 in)
- Position: Goalkeeper

Team information
- Current team: Sanat Naft Abadan
- Number: 1

Youth career
- –2014: Parseh Tehran
- 2014: Naft Novin

Senior career*
| Years | Team | Apps | (Gls) |
| 2014–2016 | Naft Tehran | 2 | (0) |
| 2016–2017 | Saipa | 0 | (0) |
| 2017–2019 | Pars Jonoubi | 32 | (0) |
| 2019–2020 | Saipa | 11 | (0) |
| 2020–2021 | Naft MIS | 19 | (0) |
| 2021–2022 | Sanat Naft | 12 | (0) |
| 2022–2024 | Persepolis | 8 | (0) |
| 2023–2024 | → Aluminium Arak (loan) | 27 | (0) |
| 2024–2025 | Esteghlal Khuzestan | 27 | (0) |
| 2025–2026 | Paykan | 10 | (0) |
| 2026– | Sanat Naft | 10 | (0) |

International career
| 2013 | Iran U17 | 0 | (0) |
| 2014 | Iran U19 | 0 | (0) |
Medal record
Representing Iran
CAFA Nations Cup
| Runner-up | 2025 Tajikistan–Uzbekistan | Team |
- * Club domestic league appearances and goals as of 1 June 2024

Ahmad Gohari (Persian: احمد گوهری; born 12 January 1996) is an Iranian professional footballer who plays as a Goalkeeper for Persian Gulf Pro League club Sanat Naft.

== Club career ==
=== Pars Jonoubi Jam ===
He made his debut for Pars Jonoubi Jam in 29th fixtures of 2017–18 Iran Pro League against Naft Tehran.

=== Persepolis ===
On 2 February 2022, Gohari signed a 18-month contract with Persian Gulf Pro League champions Persepolis. Gohari has joined Persepolis as replacement of Božidar Radošević.

== Club career statistics ==
As of 15 June 2024

| Club | Division | Season | League | | Hazfi Cup | | Asia | | Other | | Total | |
| Club | Division | Season | Apps | Goals | Apps | Goals | Apps | Goals | Apps | Goals | Apps | Goals |
|---|---|---|---|---|---|---|---|---|---|---|---|---|
| Naft Tehran | Pro League | 2014–15 | 0 | 0 | 0 | 0 | 0 | 0 | — | | 0 | 0 |
| Naft Tehran | Pro League | 2015–16 | 0 | 0 | 0 | 0 | 0 | 0 | — | | 0 | 0 |
| Naft Tehran | Total | | 0 | 0 | 0 | 0 | 0 | 0 | — | | 0 | 0 |
| Saipa | Pro League | 2016–17 | 0 | 0 | 0 | 0 | — | | — | | 0 | 0 |
| Saipa | Total | | 0 | 0 | 0 | 0 | — | | — | | 0 | 0 |
| Pars Jonoubi | Pro League | 2017–18 | 2 | 0 | 0 | 0 | — | | — | | 2 | 0 |
| Pars Jonoubi | Pro League | 2018–19 | 14 | 0 | 1 | 0 | — | | — | | 15 | 0 |
| Pars Jonoubi | Total | | 16 | 0 | 1 | 0 | — | | — | | 17 | 0 |
| Saipa | Pro League | 2019–20 | 3 | 0 | 2 | 0 | — | | — | | 5 | 0 |
| Saipa | Total | | 3 | 0 | 2 | 0 | — | | — | | 5 | 0 |
| Naft MIS | Pro League | 2020–21 | 11 | 0 | 1 | 0 | — | | — | | 12 | 0 |
| Naft MIS | Total | | 11 | 0 | 1 | 0 | — | | — | | 12 | 0 |
| Sanat Naft | Pro League | 2021–22 | 12 | 0 | 0 | 0 | — | | — | | 12 | 0 |
| Sanat Naft | Total | | 12 | 0 | 0 | 0 | — | | — | | 12 | 0 |
| Persepolis | Pro League | 2021–22 | 5 | 0 | 1 | 0 | — | | — | | 6 | 0 |
| Persepolis | Pro League | 2022–23 | 3 | 0 | 1 | 0 | — | | — | | 4 | 0 |
| Persepolis | Total | | 8 | 0 | 2 | 0 | 0 | 0 | 0 | 0 | 10 | 0 |
| Aluminium Arak (loan) | Pro League | 2023–24 | 27 | 0 | 4 | 0 | — | | — | | 31 | 0 |
| Aluminium Arak (loan) | Total | | 27 | 0 | 4 | 0 | — | | — | | 31 | 0 |
| Career Total | | | 77 | 0 | 10 | 0 | 0 | 0 | 0 | 0 | 87 | 0 |

== International career ==
=== Iran Youth ===
In 2013, he participated in the Iranian U-17 national team in the U-17 World Cup. Gohari also in the Iranian U-19 national team in the 2014 Asian U-19 Championship.

== Honours ==
Persepolis

- Persian Gulf Pro League: 2022–23
