= 2022–23 Hazfi Cup =

Iranian Football tournament season

Iranian Knockout Cup
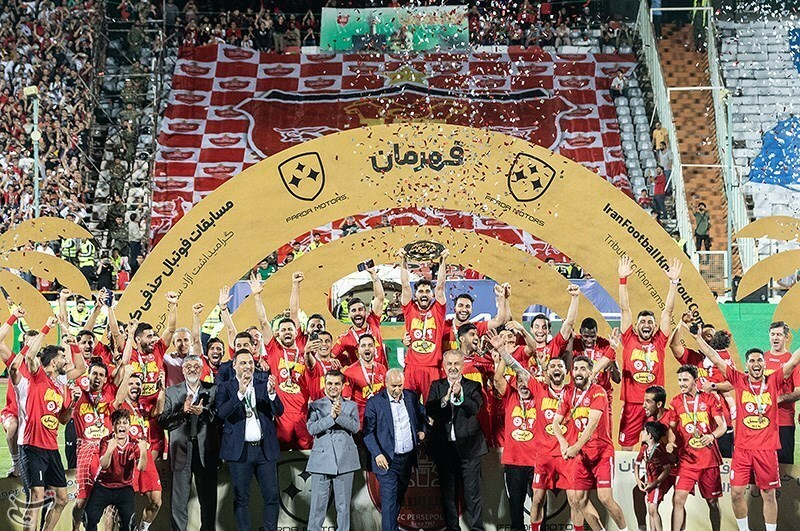

Tournament details
- Country: Iran
- Dates: 9 October 2022 – 31 May 2023
- Teams: 88

Final positions
- Champions: Persepolis
- Runners-up: Esteghlal

Tournament statistics
- Matches played: 64
- Goals scored: 165 (2.58 per match)
- Top goal scorer: Giorgi Gvelesiani (4 Goals)
- All statistics correct as of 31 May 2022.

The 2022–23 Hazfi Cup was the 36th season of the Iranian football knockout competition.

Persepolis became the champion of Iranian Hazfi Cup after defeating Esteghlal in the final. As the champion of this competition, they got the license to participate in the Super Cup and the AFC Champions League next season.

== Participating teams ==
A total of 88 teams (out of a possible total of 96 eligible teams) participated. The teams were divided into four main groups.

- 16 teams of the Persian Gulf Pro League: entering at the Round of 32.
- 18 teams of the Azadegan League: entering at the third round.
- 28 teams from the 2nd Division: entering at the second round.
- 26 teams (out of a possible total of 34 (Note: Kish, Khoramshahr and Tehran have extra representatives) teams) from Provincial Leagues: entering from first round.

== Schedule ==
The schedule of the competition is as follows.

Stage	Round	Draw date	Matches dates
First stage	Round 1	24 September 2022	9,10 October 2022
First stage	Round 2	19 October 2022	9,10 November 2022
First stage	Round 3	16 November 2022	11,12 December 2022
Second Stage	Round of 32	24 December 2022	10–12 January 2023
Second Stage	Round of 16	23 January 2023	20–22 February 2023 17 March 2023
Second Stage	Quarter-finals	7 March 2023	29–30 April 2023
Second Stage	Semi-finals	30 April 2023	24, 25 May 2023
Second Stage	Final	30 April 2023	31 May 2023

== First stage ==
=== First round ===
Number of teams per tier entering this round
Pro League (1)	1. division (2)	2. division (3)	Provincial Leagues (4)	Total
16 / 16	18 / 18	28 / 28	26 / 34	88 / 96

9 October 2022 1	Pars Bandar Kiashahr (4)	w/o	Sorkhpooshan Pakdasht (4)	Kiashahr
14:30				Stadium: Shahid Esmaeilian

10 October 2022 1	Kia Shahrood (4)	v	Gostaresh Khoy (4)	Shahrood
14:00				Stadium: Takhti

10 October 2022 1	Setaregan Sivan Ilam (4)	1–2	Setaregan Kermanshah (4)	Ilam
14:30				Stadium: Takhti

10 October 2022 1	Oxygen Marand (4)	1–2	Poshtibani Shomal Shargh Mashhad (4)	Marand
14:30				Stadium: Takhti

10 October 2022 1	Qiam Abhar (4)	v	Kordestan's Representative (4)	Abhar
14:30				Stadium: Daneshgah

9 October 2022 1	Ghafari Takestan (4)	5–1	Ra'd Mahalat (4)	Takestan
14:00				Stadium: 15 Khordad

10 October 2022 1	Mi'ad Moghan (4)	0–1	Damash Tehran (4)	Parsabad Moghan
14:00				Stadium: Shahid Kalantari

10 October 2022 1	Vahdat Aghasht (4)	v	Ku Amacity Qom (4)	Karaj
14:30				Stadium: Shahid Shariati

10 October 2022 1	Padide San'at Mobarakeh (4)	3–2	Etehad Sefin Kish (4)	Mobarakeh
14:30				Stadium: 22 Bahman

10 October 2022 1	Koorosh Kabir Zabol (4)	0–0 (a.e.t.) (7–8 p)	Poolad Oxin Izeh (4)	Zabol
14:00				Stadium: Shahid Hosseini Tabatabayi

10 October 2022 1	Payam Shargh Qaen (4)	v	Pouyandegan Talash Marvdasht (4)	Qaen
14:00				Stadium: Aminzadeh

9 October 2022 1	Harang Javan Bastak (4)	4–0	Shahid Ansari Barez Lordegan (4)	Bastak
14:30				Stadium: Takhti

9 October 2022 1	Zagros Basht (4)	0–1	Abouzar Kangan (4)	Basht
14:30				Stadium: Takhti

Notes

=== Second round ===
Number of teams per tier entering this round
Pro League (1)	1. division (2)	2. division (3)	Provincial Leagues (4)	Total
16 / 16	18 / 18	15 / 28	13 / 34	62 / 96

10 November 2022 2	Damash Tehran (4)	3–0	Poolad Oxin Izeh (4)	Baghershahr
14:00				Stadium: Atre Sib

9 November 2022 2	Iman Sabz Shiraz (3)	3–0	Qiam Abhar (4)	Shiraz
14:00				Stadium: Be'sat

9 November 2022 2	Abouzar Kangan (4)	2–0	Pars Bandar Kiashahr (4)	Kangan
14:30				Stadium: Shohadaye Varzeshkar

9 November 2022 2	Damashian Rasht (3)	1–0	Foolad Hormozgan (3)	Rasht
14:30				Stadium: Sardar Jangal

10 November 2022 2	Shahid Oraki Eslamshahr (3)	6–0	Kia Shahrood (4)	Eslamshahr
14:00				Stadium: Imam Khomeini

9 November 2022 2	Panik Talesh (3)	w/o	Payam Shargh Qaen (4)	Talesh
14:30				Stadium: Pooriaye Vali

9 November 2022 2	Nirooye Zamini (3)	0–0 (a.e.t.) (3–4 p)	Harang Javan Bastak (4)	Tehran
14:00				Stadium: Ghadie

10 November 2022 2	Be'sat Kermanshah (3)	2–1	Shahid Ghandi Yazd (3)	Kermanshah
14:00				Stadium: Azadi

9 November 2022 2	Ario Bam Eslamshahr (3)	1–0	Vahdat Aghasht (4)	Eslamshahr
14:00				Stadium: Imam Khomeini

10 November 2022 2	Shohadaye Babolsar (3)	3–3 (a.e.t.) (7–6 p)	Vista Turbin Tehran (3)	Babolsar
14:00				Stadium: Shahid Alizadeh

10 November 2022 2	Navad Urmia (3)	1–0	Padide San'at Mobarakeh (4)	Urumia
14:30				Stadium: Takhti

9 November 2022 2	Poshtibani Shomal Shargh Mashhad (4)	3–1	Mes Novin Kerman (3)	Mashhad
14:00				Stadium: Samen-al-Aemeh

9 November 2022 2	Setaregan Kermanshah (4)	w/o	Shahin Taban Bushehr (3)	Kermanshah
14:00				Stadium: Azadi

9 November 2022 2	PAS Hamedan (3)	2–0	Ghafari Takestan (4)	Hamedan
14:15				Stadium: Haji Babayi

Notes

=== Third round ===
Omid Vahdat Mashhad were unable to participate due to their disqualification from the Azadegan League.

Number of teams per tier entering this round
Pro League (1)	1. division (2)	2. division (3)	Provincial Leagues (4)	Total
16 / 16	17 / 18	9 / 28	5 / 34	47 / 96

12 December 2022 3	Shahid Oraki Eslamshahr (3)	0–1	Ario Bam Eslamshahr (3)	Eslamshahr
14:00				Stadium: Emam khomeini

11 December 2022 3	Fajr Sepasi Shiraz (2)	1–0	Poshtibani Shomal Shargh Mashhad (4)	Shiraz
14:00				Stadium: Hafezieh Stadium

12 December 2022 3	Iman Sabz Shiraz (3)	4–0	Abouzar Kangan (4)	Shiraz
14:00				Stadium: Be'sat Shiraz

11 December 2022 3	Khooshe Talaei (2)	w/o	Shahrdari Astara (2)	Kashan
14:00				Stadium: Amir Kabir

11 December 2022 3	Esteghlal Mollasani (2)	2–0	Panik Talesh (3)	Ahvaz
14:15				Stadium: Ghadir Stadium

11 December 2022 3	Mes Shahr-e Babak (2)	w/o	Kheybar Khorramabad (2)	Shahr-e-Babak
14:00				Stadium: Sardar soleimani

12 December 2022 3	Arman Gohar Sirjan (2)	2–0	Damash Tehran (4)	sirjan
14:00				Stadium: Emam Ali

12 December 2022 3	Harang Javan Bastak (4)	0–0 (a.e.t.) (4–5 p)	Shahrdari Hamedan (2)	Bandar Abbas
14:15				Stadium: Khalij Fars

11 December 2022 3	Chooka Talesh (2)	1–4	Be'sat Kermanshah (3)	Talesh
14:00				Stadium: Poorya Vali

11 December 2022 3	Chadormalu Ardakan (2)	2–0	Khalij Fars Mahshahr (2)	Yazd
14:00				Stadium: Nasiri Stadium

12 December 2022 3	Van Pars Naghse Jahan (2)	7–0	Setaregan Kermanshah (4)	Isfahan
14:00				Stadium: Foolad Shahr Stadium

12 December 2022 3	Esteghlal Khuzestan (2)	w/o	Damashian Rasht (3)	Ahvaz
14:15				Stadium: Ghadir Stadium

11 December 2022 3	Pars Jonoubi Jam (2)	2–1	Shams Azar (2)	Jam
14:00				Stadium: Takhti

12 December 2022 3	Darya Babol (2)	2–1	Shohadaye Babolsar (3)	Babol
14:00				Stadium: Haftom tir

12 December 2022 3	Saipa (2)	2–1	PAS Hamedan (3)	Tehran
14:00				Stadium: Shahid Dastgerdi Stadium

Notes

- Bye to fourth round: Navad Urmia (3).

== Second stage ==
=== Bracket ===
Fourth round (round of 32); 10–12 January 2023
Shahrdari Hamedan	1 (7)
Darya Babol	1 (8)
Pars Jonoubi Jam	1
Iman Sabz Shiraz	0
Esteghlal	2
Tractor	1
Malavan	3
Naft Masjed Soleyman	0
Ario Bam Eslamshahr	2
Aluminium Arak	3
Nassaji	2
Fajr Sepasi	1
Be'sat Kermanshah	1 (6)
Navad Urmia	1 (7)
Paykan	1
Esteghlal Khuzestan	0
Arman Gohar	1
Esteghlal Mollasani	3
Mes Kerman	2
Sanat Naft	0
Havadar	1
Chadormalu Ardakan	0
Mes Rafsanjan	1
Zob Ahan	0
Persepolis	2 (4)
Van Pars Naghse Jahan	2 (1)
Sepahan	3
Saipa	0
Gol Gohar	2
Mes Shahr-e Babak	1
Foolad	2
Khooshe Talaei	0

Fifth round (round of 16); 19–22 February 2023; 17 March 2023
Darya Babol	0 (3)
Pars Jonoubi Jam	0 (4)
Esteghlal	2
Malavan	0
Aluminium Arak	0 (5)
Nassaji	0 (6)
Navad Urmia	0
Paykan	2
Esteghlal Mollasani	3
Mes Kerman	1
Havadar	0 (5)
Mes Rafsanjan	0 (4)
Persepolis	4
Sepahan	2
Gol Gohar	1
Foolad	0

Sixth round (quarter-final); 29–30 April 2023
Pars Jonoubi Jam	0
Esteghlal	1
Nassaji	3
Paykan	0
Esteghlal Mollasani	1
Havadar	2
Persepolis	2
Gol Gohar	1

Semi-final; 24–25 May 2023
Esteghlal	4
Nassaji	0
Havadar	1
Persepolis	3

Final; 31 May 2023
Esteghlal	1
Persepolis	2

=== Round of 32 (4th Round) ===
Number of teams per tier entering this round
Pro League (1)	1. division (2)	2. division (3)	Provincial Leagues (4)	Total
16 / 16	12 / 18	4 / 28	0 / 34	32 / 96

10 January 2023 4	Havadar (1)	1–0	Chadormalu Ardakan (2)	Tehran
14:00				Stadium: Pas Ghavamin

12 January 2023 4	Esteghlal (1)	2–1 (a.e.t.)	Tractor (1)	Tehran
15:00				Stadium: Azadi

10 January 2023 4	Foolad (1)	2–0	Khooshe Talaei (2)	Ahvaz
16:00				Stadium: Shohadaye Foolad

11 January 2023 4	Arman Gohar Sirjan (2)	1–3	Esteghlal Mollasani (2)	Sirjan
14:00				Stadium: Imam Ali

10 January 2023 4	Gol Gohar (1)	2–1 (a.e.t.)	Mes Shahr-e Babak (2)	Sirjan
14:00				Stadium: Shahid Soleymani

11 January 2023 4	Malavan (1)	3–0	Naft MasjedSoleyman (1)	Bandar-e Anzali
14:00				Stadium: Takhti
Note: match awarded to Malavan

10 January 2023 4	Be'sat Kermanshah (3)	1–1 (a.e.t.) (6–7 p)	Navad Urmia (3)	Kermanshah
14:00				Stadium: Azadi

11 January 2023 4	Pars Jonoubi Jam (2)	1–0 (a.e.t.)	Iman Sabz Shiraz (3)	Jam
14:00				Stadium: Takhti

11 January 2023 4	Mes Rafsanjan (1)	1–0	Zob Ahan (1)	Rafsanjan
14:00				Stadium: Shohadaye Mes

11 January 2023 4	Paykan (1)	1–0	Esteghlal Khuzestan (2)	Karaj
14:00				Stadium: Enghelab

12 January 2023 4	Mes Kerman (1)	2–0	Sanat Naft (1)	Kerman
14:00				Stadium: Imam Ali

11 January 2023 4	Nassaji Mazandaran (1)	2–1	Fajr Sepasi Shiraz (2)	Qaem Shahr
14:00				Stadium: Vatani

11 January 2023 4	Sepahan (1)	3–0	Saipa (2)	Isfahan
14:00				Stadium: Naghsh-e Jahan

11 January 2023 4	Shahrdari Hamedan (2)	1–1 (a.e.t.) (7–8 p)	Darya Babol (2)	Hamedan
14:00				Stadium: Haji Babayi

10 January 2023 4	Persepolis (1)	2–2 (a.e.t.) (4–1 p)	Van Pars Naghse Jahan (2)	Tehran
15:00				Stadium: Azadi

10 January 2023 4	Ario Bam Eslamshahr (3)	2–3 (a.e.t.)	Aluminium (1)	Eslamshahr
13:30				Stadium: Imam Khomeini

=== Round of 16 (5th Round) ===
Number of teams per tier entering this round
Pro League (1)	1. division (2)	2. division (3)	Provincial Leagues (4)	Total
12 / 16	3 / 18	1 / 28	0 / 34	16 / 96

20 February 2023 5	Esteghlal (1)	2–0	Malavan (1)	Tehran
17:30				Stadium: Azadi

22 February 2023 5	Sepahan (1)	2–4 (a.e.t.)	Persepolis (1)	Isfahan
17:00				Stadium: Naghsh-e Jahan

21 February 2023 5	Aluminium (1)	0–0 (a.e.t.) (5–6 p)	Nassaji Mazandaran (1)	Arak
15:00				Stadium: Imam Khomeini

21 February 2023 5	Esteghlal Mollasani (2)	3–1 (a.e.t.)	Mes Kerman (1)	Ahvaz
14:00				Stadium: Ghadir Stadium

17 March 2023 5	Gol Gohar (1)	1–0	Foolad (1)	Sirjan
16:30				Stadium: Shahid Soleimani

20 February 2023 5	Navad Urmia (3)	0–2	Paykan (1)	Urmia
14:00				Stadium: Takhti

19 February 2023 5	Darya Babol (2)	0–0 (a.e.t.) (3–4 p)	Pars Jonoubi Jam (2)	Babol
14:00				Stadium: Haftom tir

20 February 2023 5	Havadar (1)	0–0 (a.e.t.) (5–4 p)	Mes Rafsanjan (1)	Tehran
15:00				Stadium: Pas Ghavamin

=== Quarter Final (6th Round) ===
Number of teams per tier entering this round
Pro League (1)	1. division (2)	2. division (3)	Provincial Leagues (4)	Total
6 / 16	2 / 18	0 / 28	0 / 34	8 / 96

29 April 2023 6	Esteghlal Mollasani (2)	1–2	Havadar (1)	Ahvaz
18:00				Stadium: Ghadir Stadium

29 April 2023 6	Pars Jonoubi Jam (2)	0–1 (a.e.t.)	Esteghlal (1)	Jam
17:30				Stadium: Takhti

30 April 2023 6	Nassaji Mazandaran (1)	3–0	Paykan (1)	Qaem Shahr
17:00				Stadium: Vatani

30 April 2023 6	Persepolis (1)	2–1	Gol Gohar (1)	Tehran
18:15				Stadium: Azadi

=== Semi-Final (7th Round) ===
Number of teams per tier entering this round
Pro League (1)	1. division (2)	2. division (3)	Provincial Leagues (4)	Total
4 / 16	0 / 18	0 / 28	0 / 34	4 / 96

24 May 2023 7	Esteghlal (1)	4–0	Nassaji Mazandaran (1)	Tehran
18:30	Arash Rezavand 25'; Alireza Ebrahimi (OG) 34'; Mohammad Mohebi 57', 89'			Stadium: Azadi; Referee: Hasan Akrami

25 May 2023 7	Havadar (1)	1–3	Persepolis (1)	Tehran
18:30	Babak Moradi (P) 61'		Giorgi Gvelesiani (P) 4'; Vahid Amiri 9'; Issa Alekasir 72'	Stadium: Pas Ghavamin; Referee: Ali Safayi

=== Final ===
Number of teams per tier entering this round
Pro League (1)	1. division (2)	2. division (3)	Provincial Leagues (4)	Total
2 / 16	0 / 18	0 / 28	0 / 34	2 / 96

31 May 2023 8	Esteghlal (1)	1–2 (a.e.t.)	Persepolis (1)	Tehran
19:45	Mohammad Hossein Moradmand 90'+11		Mehdi Torabi 30'; Omid Alishah 115'	Stadium: Azadi; Referee: Ashkan Khorshidi

== See also ==
- 2022–23 Persian Gulf Pro League
- 2022–23 Azadegan League
- 2022–23 2nd Division
- 2022–23 3rd Division
- 2022 Iranian Super Cup
