= 2020–21 Esteghlal F.C. season =

Esteghlal F.C.
2020–21 season
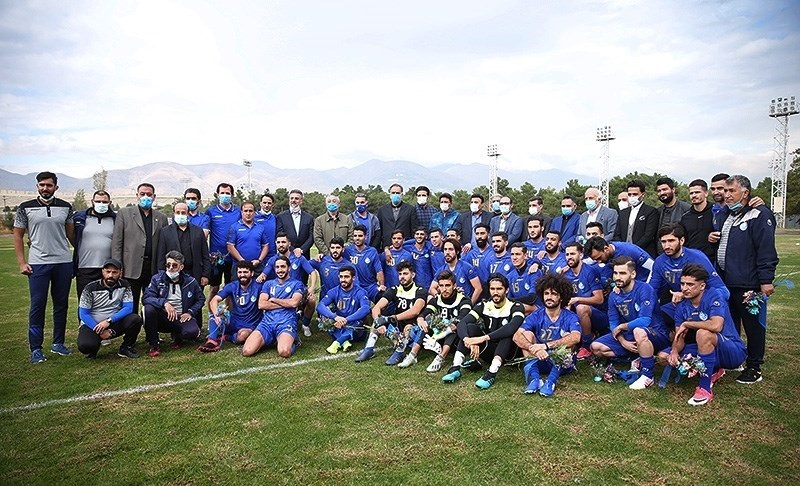
- President: Ahmad Madadi
- Head coach: Mahmoud Fekri (until 2 March 2021); Farhad Majidi (from 3 March 2021)
- Stadium: Azadi Stadium
- Pro League: 3rd
- Hazfi Cup: Runner-up
- AFC Champions League: Round of 16
- Top goalscorer: League: Amir Arsalan Motahari (7); All: Mehdi Ghayedi (9)
- Average home league attendance: 0 (Note: All matches were played behind closed doors.)
Home colours	Away colours	Third colours

The 2020–21 Esteghlal Football Club season is the club's 75th season in existence and the 27th consecutive season in the top flight of Iranian football. In addition to the domestic league, Esteghlal participates in this season's editions of the Hazfi Cup, and the AFC Champions League.

== Players ==
=== First team squad ===
Last updated: 28 February 2021

No.	Name	Nat	Position	Date of birth (age)	Since	End	Signed from
Goalkeepers
1	Hossein Hosseini	(Iran)	GK	30 June 1992 (aged 28)	2012	2021	(Iran) Youth Sector
12	Mohammad Rashid Mazaheri	(Iran)	GK	18 May 1989 (aged 31)	2020	2022	(Iran) Tractor
90	Sina Saeidifar	(Iran)	GK	12 April 2001 (aged 19)	2020	2024	(Iran) Youth Sector
Defenders
2	Mohammad Naderi	(Iran)	LB / CB	5 October 1996 (aged 24)	2020	2021	(Belgium) Kortrijk
3	Mohammad Hossein Moradmand	(Iran)	CB	22 June 1993 (aged 27)	2020	2022	(Iran) Shahr Khodro
4	Siavash Yazdani	(Iran)	CB	2 March 1992 (aged 28)	2019	2021	(Iran) Sepahan
5	Aref Gholami	(Iran)	CB / RB	19 April 1997 (aged 23)	2019	2022	(Iran) Foolad
20	Ahmad Mousavi	(Iran)	RB / RW	4 February 1992 (aged 28)	2020	2022	(Iran) Gol Gohar
21	Vouria Ghafouri	(Iran)	RB / RW	20 September 1987 (aged 33)	2016	2022	(Iran) Sepahan
27	Matin Karimzadeh	(Iran)	LB / LM	1 July 1998 (aged 22)	2020	2023	(Iran) Pars Jonoubi
33	Hrvoje Milić	(Croatia)	LB / LM	10 May 1989 (aged 31)	2019	2021	(Italy) Crotone
70	Mohammad Daneshgar	(Iran)	CB / RB	20 January 1994 (aged 26)	2018	2022	(Iran) Saipa
Midfielders
6	Masoud Rigi	(Iran)	DM / CM	22 February 1991 (aged 29)	2019	2021	(Iran) Shahr Khodro
8	Farshid Esmaeili	(Iran)	AM / LW / RW	23 February 1994 (aged 26)	2015	2021	(Iran) Fajr Sepasi
9	Mehdi Mehdipour	(Iran)	CM / DM	18 February 1994 (aged 26)	2020	2023	(Iran) Zob Ahan
11	Dariush Shojaeian	(Iran)	AM / RW / LW	7 April 1992 (aged 28)	2017	2021	(Iran) Gostaresh Foulad
15	Sina Khadempour	(Iran)	DM / CB	9 January 1997 (aged 23)	2017	2023	(Iran) Naft Tehran
22	Babak Moradi	(Iran)	LW / LB	29 July 1993 (aged 27)	2020	2022	(Iran) Machine Sazi
66	Saeid Mehri	(Iran)	CM / DM	16 September 1995 (aged 25)	2021	2023	(Iran) Tractor
79	Sobhan Khaghani	(Iran)	RW / RB	27 January 2000 (aged 20)	2020	2025	(Iran) Tractor
88	Arash Rezavand	(Iran)	AM / CM / RW	5 October 1993 (aged 27)	2019	2021	(Iran) Saipa
Forwards
7	Cheick Diabaté	(Mali)	CF	25 April 1988 (aged 32)	2019	2021	(Turkey) Osmanlıspor
10	Mehdi Ghayedi	(Iran)	CF / SS / LW	5 December 1998 (aged 22)	2017	2023	(Iran) Iranjavan
17	Arman Ramezani	(Iran)	CF	22 June 1992 (aged 28)	2021	2022	(Iran) Persepolis
72	Arsalan Motahari	(Iran)	CF / RW	10 March 1993 (aged 27)	2020	2021	(Iran) Zob Ahan
Players transferred during the season
14	Farshid Bagheri	(Iran)	DM / CM	5 June 1992 (aged 28)	2016	2021	(Iran) Saba Qom

== Transfers ==
=== In ===
No.	Pos.	Nat.	Name	Age	Moving from	Type	Transfer window	Ends	Source
40	AM	(Iran)	Amir Hossein Khodamoradi	19	Esteghlal Academy	Promoted	Summer	2023	
41	RB	(Iran)	Arash Dajliri	21	Esteghlal Academy	Promoted	Summer	2023	
42	LW	(Iran)	Fardin Rabet	18	Esteghlal Academy	Promoted	Summer	2025	
43	CF	(Iran)	Mohammad Abedi	21	Esteghlal Academy	Promoted	Summer	2024	
74	CB	(Iran)	Erfan Rohani	19	Esteghlal Academy	Promoted	Summer	2024	
—	GK	(Iran)	Amir Mohammad Bahrehmand	18	Esteghlal Academy	Promoted	Summer	2022	
99	CF	(Iran)	Sajjad Aghaei	21	Zob Ahan	End of loan	Summer	2022	
12	GK	(Iran)	Mohammad Rashid Mazaheri	31	Tractor	Transfer	Summer	2022	
27	LB	(Iran)	Matin Karimzadeh	22	Pars Jonoubi	Transfer	Summer	2023	
22	LW	(Iran)	Babak Moradi	27	Machine Sazi	Transfer	Summer	2022	
20	RB	(Iran)	Ahmad Mousavi	28	Gol Gohar	Transfer	Summer	2022	
3	CB	(Iran)	Mohammad Hossein Moradmand	27	Shahr Khodro	Transfer	Summer	2022	
9	CM	(Iran)	Mehdi Mehdipour	26	Zob Ahan	Transfer	Summer	2023	
2	LB	(Iran)	Mohammad Naderi	24	(Belgium) Kortrijk	Transfer	Summer	2021	
—	CB	(Iran)	Mikaeil Sheikhi	18	Karun Ramhormoz	Transfer	Summer	2025	
—	RW	(Iran)	Alireza Khodabakhshi	18	Esteghlal Academy	Promoted	Summer	2025	
71	CF	(Iran)	Mohammad Hossein Fallah	20	Nirooye Zamini	Transfer	Summer	2025	
79	RW	(Iran)	Sobhan Khaghani	20	Tractor	Transfer	Summer	2025	
44	CB	(Iran)	Mohammad Javad Behafarin	21	Esteghlal Academy	Promoted	Summer	2025	
55	CF	(Iran)	Erfan Golmohammadi	23	Nassaji	Loan	Winter	2021	
66	CM	(Iran)	Saeid Mehri	25	Tractor	Transfer	Winter	2023	
63	GK	(Iran)	Amirhossein Bayat	22	Persepolis	Transfer	Winter		
23	CF	(Iran)	Arman Ramezani	28	Persepolis	Transfer	Winter	2022	

=== Out ===
No.	Pos.	Nat.	Name	Age	Moving to	Type	Transfer window	Source
20	CB	(Bulgaria)	Nikolay Bodurov	33	(Bulgaria) Pirin Blagoevgrad	Transfer	Summer	
30	CB	(Iran)	Azim Gök	24	Mes Kerman	Transfer	Summer	
28	LW	(Iran)	Mohsen Karimi	26	Gol Gohar	Transfer	Summer	
4	CB	(Iran)	Roozbeh Cheshmi	27	(Qatar) Umm Salal	Transfer	Summer	
—	CM	(Iran)	Aref Gholampour	20	Foolad	Transfer	Summer	
9	RW	(Iran)	Ali Dashti	26	Zob Ahan	Transfer	Summer	
80	LW	(Iran)	Mohammad Bolboli	22	Naft MIS	Loan	Summer	
6	CM	(Iran)	Ali Karimi	25	Qatar	Transfer	Summer	
43	CF	(Iran)	Mohammad Abedi	21	Badran Tehran	Transfer	Summer	
3	LB	(Iran)	Milad Zakipour	24	Gol Gohar	Transfer	Summer	
—	LM	(Iran)	Mohammad Eslami	20	Tractor	Transfer	Summer	
32	RB	(Iran)	Amirhossein Kargar	21	Gol Gohar	Transfer	Summer	
19	GK	(Iran)	Hossein Pour Hamidi	22	Aluminium Arak	Loan	Summer	
17	RW	(Iran)	Zakaria Moradi	22	Malavan	Loan	Summer	
57	CB	(Iran)	Shahin Taherkhani	23	Paykan	Transfer	Summer	
38	CM	(Iran)	Ali Tari	20	(Azerbaijan) Sabail	Transfer	Summer	
11	CF	(Iran)	Morteza Tabrizi	30	Gol Gohar	Transfer	Winter	
99	CF	(Iran)	Sajjad Aghaei	21	Nassaji	Loan	Winter	
77	CM	(Iran)	Reza Azari	23	Machine Sazi	Loan	Winter	
42	LW	(Iran)	Fardin Rabet	19	Naft MIS	Loan	Winter	
44	CB	(Iran)	Mohammadjavad Behafarin	21	Chooka Talesh	Loan	Winter	
71	CF	(Iran)	Mohammad Hossein Fallah	21	Machine Sazi	Loan	Winter	
14	DM	(Iran)	Farshid Bagheri	28	Gol Gohar	Transfer	Winter	

== Pre-season and friendlies ==
19 October 2020 1	Esteghlal	2 – 1	Naft MIS	Tehran
14:50 IRST (UTC+03:30)	Rigi 28'; Rezavand 34'	Report	Niyayesh-Pour 73'	Stadium: Azadi Stadium

24 October 2020 2	Esteghlal	1 – 0	Havadar	Tehran
15:00 IRST (UTC+03:30)	Rezavand 41'	Report		Stadium: Azadi Stadium

27 October 2020 3	Esteghlal	1 – 1	Shahrdari Astara	Tehran
14:50 IRST (UTC+03:30)	Ghafouri 80' (pen.)	Report	Rezapour 88' (pen.)	Stadium: Azadi Stadium

30 October 2020 4	Esteghlal	3 – 0	Chooka Talesh	Tehran
14:50 IRST (UTC+03:30)	Yazdani 57'; Esmaeili 62'; Rezavand 67'	Report		Stadium: Azadi Stadium

== Competitions ==
=== Overview ===
Competition	First match	Last match	Starting round	Final position	Record							
Competition	First match	Last match	Starting round	Final position	Pld	W	D	L	GF	GA	GD	Win %
Pro League	7 November 2020	30 July 2021	—	3rd	30	16	8	6	36	19	+17	53.33
Hazfi Cup	11 March 2021	8 August 2021	Round of 32	Runners-up	5	3	2	0	6	3	+3	60.00
AFC Champions League	15 April 2021	30 April 2021	Group stage	Round of 16	6	3	2	1	14	8	+6	50.00
Total					41	22	12	7	56	30	+26	53.66

Last updated: 10 August 2021.
Source: Competitions

=== Persian Gulf Pro League ===
==== Standings ====
Pos	Team	Pld	W	D	L	GF	GA	GD	Pts	Qualification or relegation
1	Persepolis (Note: Persepolis and Esteghlal did not obtain an AFC license. Therefore, even if they earn the right to play in Asian competitions based on league position, they will not be able to participate.) (C)	30	19	10	1	47	14	+33	67	
2	Sepahan	30	19	8	3	53	24	+29	65	Qualification for 2022 AFC Champions League group stage
3	Esteghlal	30	16	8	6	36	19	+17	56	
4	Tractor	30	12	9	9	35	29	+6	45	
5	Gol Gohar	30	13	6	11	33	32	+1	45	

Updated to match(es) played on 30 July 2021. Source: IPL Table, Soccerway
Rules for classification: 1) Points; 2) Goal difference; 3) Goals scored.
(C) Champions

==== Results summary ====
Overall								Home						Away					
Pld	W	D	L	GF	GA	GD	Pts	W	D	L	GF	GA	GD	W	D	L	GF	GA	GD
30	16	8	6	36	19	+17	56	9	3	3	18	9	+9	7	5	3	18	10	+8

Last updated: 31 July 2021.
Source: Ipl Stats

==== Results by round ====
Round	1	2	3	4	5	6	7	8	9	10	11	12	13	14	15	16	17	18	19	20	21	22	23	24	25	26	27	28	29	30
Ground	H	A	H	A	H	A	A	H	A	H	A	H	A	H	A	A	H	A	H	A	H	H	A	H	A	H	A	H	A	H
Result	W	L	W	D	D	W	D	D	W	W	W	L	D	W	L	D	W	W	D	W	W	L	L	W	D	W	W	W	W	L
Position	4	6	2	5	4	1	2	4	1	1	1	1	2	2	3	3	3	3	3	3	3	3	3	3	3	3	3	3	3	3

Updated to match(es) played on 31 July 2021. Source: "Ipl".
A = Away; H = Home; W = Win; D = Draw; L = Loss

==== Matches ====
7 November 2020 1	Esteghlal	2–0	Mes Rafsanjan	Tehran
16:30 IRST (UTC+03:30)	Bagheri (yellow card) 40'; Ghafouri 58' (yellow card) 79'; Esmaeili (yellow card) 65'; Motahari 66'; Rezavand (yellow card) 83'	Report	Eslamikhah (yellow card) 17'; Aghajanpour (yellow card) 55'; Zahedi (yellow card) 60'	Stadium: Azadi Stadium; Attendance: 0 (Note: The match was played behind closed doors due to the COVID-19 pandemic in Iran.); Referee: Reza Jafari

20 November 2020 2	Foolad	2–1	Esteghlal	Ahvaz
16:40 IRST (UTC+03:30)	Ahmadzadeh (yellow card) 66' (goal) 72'; Coulibaly (yellow card) 79'; Abshak (yellow card) 83'; Derakhshan-Mehr (yellow card) 84'; Pereira 90' (pen.)	Report	Ghafouri 63' (pen.); Rigi (yellow card) 86'; Gholami (yellow card) 86'; Moradmand (yellow card) 89'	Stadium: Foolad Arena; Attendance: 0 Referee: Mohammad Hossein Zahedifar

25 November 2020 3	Esteghlal	1–0	Machine Sazi	Tehran
16:15 IRST (UTC+03:30)	Milić 57'	Report	Sadeghi (yellow card) 84'	Stadium: Azadi Stadium; Attendance: 0 Referee: Ali Bye

1 December 2020 4	Paykan	0–0	Esteghlal	Shahr-e Qods
16:15 IRST (UTC+03:30)	Abdi (yellow card) 41'; Salehi (yellow card) 47'	Report	Rezavand (yellow card) 17'	Stadium: Shahre Qods Stadium; Attendance: 0 Referee: Seyyed Mehdi Seyyad Ali

7 December 2020 5	Esteghlal	1–1	Sanat Naft	Tehran
16:15 IRST (UTC+03:30)	Shojaeian (yellow card) 45'; Mousavi 50'; Ghayedi (yellow card) 63'; Moradmand (yellow card) 90+1'	Report	Tayyebi 82'; Alekasir (yellow card) 90+1'	Stadium: Azadi Stadium; Attendance: 0 Referee: Hassan Akrami

13 December 2020 6	Shahr Khodro	0–2	Esteghlal	Mashhad
15:45 IRST (UTC+03:30)	Masoumi (red card) 25'; Faramarzi (yellow card) 74'	Report	Shojaeian (yellow card) 32'; Daneshgar 45'; Rezavand (yellow card) 72'	Stadium: Imam Reza Stadium; Attendance: 0 Referee: Kopal Nazemi

18 December 2020 7	Zob Ahan	0–0	Esteghlal	Isfahan
15:45 IRST (UTC+03:30)	Jahani (yellow card) 44'; Hosseini (yellow card) 43'; Pourafzar (yellow card) 60'	Report	Mehdipour (yellow card) 64'	Stadium: Foolad Shahr Stadium; Attendance: 0 Referee: Morteza Mansourian

11 January 2021 8	Esteghlal	2–2	Persepolis	Tehran
16:35 IRST (UTC+03:30)	Motahari 2'; Mousavi (yellow card) 41'; Gholami (yellow card) 55'; Ghayedi 90+3'	Report	Abdi 51'; Amiri 66'; Kanaanizadegan (yellow card) 76'; Sarlak (yellow card) 81'	Stadium: Azadi Stadium; Attendance: 0 Referee: Reza Kermanshahi

30 December 2020 9	Gol Gohar	1–2	Esteghlal	Sirjan
16:20 IRST (UTC+03:30)	Haghighi (yellow card) 6'; Ebrahimi (yellow card) 45'; Zendeh-Rouh 78' (pen.) (yellow card) 86'; Alizadeh (yellow card) 90+3'	Report	Ghafouri 8' (pen.) (penalty missed) 30'; Ghayedi 14'; Daneshgar (yellow card) 15'; Mazaheri (yellow card) 83'	Stadium: Imam Ali Stadium; Attendance: 0 Referee: Mohammadreza Akbarian

4 January 2021 10	Esteghlal	2–0	Aluminium Arak	Tehran
16:30 IRST (UTC+03:30)	Motahari 38'; Ghayedi 73'	Report	Ahmadi (yellow card) 18'	Stadium: Azadi Stadium; Attendance: 0 Referee: Aliasghar Momeni

18 January 2021 11	Tractor	1–3	Esteghlal	Tabriz
14:30 IRST (UTC+03:30)	Mehri (yellow card) 53'; Fakhreddini (yellow card) 63'; Abbaszadeh 80'	Report	Naderi (yellow card) 18'; Rigi (yellow card) 35'; Shojaeian (yellow card) 36'; Diabaté 38', 65'; Ghayedi 60'	Stadium: Yadegar-e Emam Stadium; Attendance: 0 Referee: Bijan Heydari

23 January 2021 12	Esteghlal	0–1	Saipa	Tehran
16:45IRST (UTC+03:30)	Daneshgar (yellow card) 45'; Mehdipour (yellow card) 54'; Naderi (yellow card) 80'	Report	Monadi (yellow card) 43'; Maleki 49'; Jafari (yellow card) 76'; Jalali (yellow card) 83'; Heydari (yellow card) 86'; Mahini (yellow card) 88'	Stadium: Azadi Stadium; Attendance: 0 Referee: Yaser Hamrang

29 January 2021 13	Naft MIS	1–1	Esteghlal	Masjed Soleyman
15:00 IRST (UTC+03:30)	Bolboli (yellow card) 22'; Hosseini 32' (o.g.); Entezari (yellow card) 83'	Report	Rezavand (yellow card) 55'; Ghafouri 70'	Stadium: Behnam Mohammadi Stadium; Attendance: 0 Referee: Payam Heydari

5 February 2021 14	Esteghlal	1–0	Nassaji	Tehran
17:00 IRST (UTC+03:30)	Daneshgar (yellow card) 41'; Moradi (yellow card) 59'; Naderi (yellow card) 69'; Ghafouri (yellow card) 72'; Esmaeili 86'; Ghayedi (penalty missed) 90'	Report	M. Bayrami (yellow card) 60'; A. Davaran (yellow card) 77'	Stadium: Azadi Stadium; Attendance: 0 Referee: Moud Bonyadifar

13 February 2021 15	Sepahan	2–0	Esteghlal	Isfahan
17:10 IRST (UTC+03:30)	Shahbazzadeh 14'; Karimi (yellow card) 32'; Rafiei 35'; Noorafkan (yellow card) 42'	Report	A. Rezavand (yellow card) 34'	Stadium: Naghsh-e-Jahan; Attendance: 0 Referee: Seyyed Vahid Kazemi

1 March 2021 16	Mes Rafsanjan	1–1	Esteghlal	Rafsanjan
14:30 IRST (UTC+03:30)	Zahedi 15'; Eslamikhah (yellow card) 38'; Tarhani (yellow card) 56'	Report	H. Noormohammadi 52' (o.g.); A. Rezavand (yellow card) 90+5'	Stadium: Shohadaye Mes Rafsanjan Stadium; Attendance: 0 Referee: Saeid Rahimi Moghaddam

6 March 2021 17	Esteghlal	1–0	Foolad	Tehran
17:30 IRST (UTC+03:30)	Ghayedi (yellow card) 32'; Daneshgar (yellow card) 45'; Motahari 82' (pen.); Mazaheri (yellow card) 90+5'	Report		Stadium: Azadi Stadium; Attendance: 0 Referee: Komeil Gholami

17 March 2021 18	Machine Sazi	0–2	Esteghlal	Tabriz
16:00 IRST (UTC+03:30)	Gordani (yellow card) 73'	Report	Naderi 19' (yellow card) 53'; Motahari 42'	Stadium: Bonyan Diesel Stadium; Attendance: 0 Referee: Ashkan Khorshidi

3 April 2021 19	Esteghlal	0–0	Paykan	Tehran
18:50 IRDT (UTC+04:30)	Diabaté (yellow card) 30'; Shojaeian (yellow card) 66'; Moradmand (yellow card) 78'	Report	Pour Amini (yellow card) 28'; Mohammadi 31'	Stadium: Azadi Stadium; Attendance: 0 Referee: Reza Kermanshahi

24 May 2021 20	Sanat Naft	0–1	Esteghlal	Abadan
21:30 IRDT (UTC+04:30)	Baghlani (red card) 52'	Report	Ghayedi (yellow card) 36'; Ramezani 90+5'	Stadium: Takhti Stadium; Attendance: 0 Referee: Hamid Hajmalek

21 June 2021 21	Esteghlal	2–0	Shahr Khodro	Tehran
19:15 IRDT (UTC+04:30)	Ramezani 48'; Rigi (yellow card) 71'; Naderi (yellow card) 72'; Ghayedi 90+15'	Report	Masoumi (yellow card) 42'; Mohammadzadeh (yellow card) 90+13'	Stadium: Azadi Stadium; Attendance: 0 Referee: Komeil Gholami

9 May 2021 22	Esteghlal	0–2	Zob Ahan	Tehran
22:15 IRDT (UTC+04:30)	Rezavand (yellow card) 24'	Report	Mohammadzadeh 7'; Mahmoud-Abadi (yellow card) 15'; Ranjbari (yellow card) 45'; Kazemi (yellow card) 51'; Jahani 60'; Soltani-Mehr (yellow card) 70'	Stadium: Azadi Stadium; Attendance: 0 Referee: Reza Adel

14 May 2021 23	Persepolis	1–0	Esteghlal	Tehran
20:30 IRDT (UTC+04:30)	Moghanlou (yellow card) 30'; Amiri (yellow card) 51'; Alekasir 55' (yellow card) 81'; Lak (yellow card) 65'; Faraji (red card) 90+7'	Report	Naderi (yellow card) 90+7'	Stadium: Azadi Stadium; Attendance: 0 Referee: Mohammad Reza Akbarian

25 June 2021 24	Esteghlal	2–0	Gol Gohar	Tehran
21:50 IRDT (UTC+04:30)	Moradmand 12'; Mehdipour 19'; Esmaeili (yellow card) 87'	Report	Mensha (yellow card) 24'; Alizadeh (yellow card) 70'; Sohrabian (yellow card) 90'	Stadium: Azadi Stadium; Attendance: 0 Referee: Mohammad Hossein Zahedifard

1 July 2021 25	Aluminium Arak	0–0	Esteghlal	Arak
19:50 IRDT (UTC+04:30)	Ahmadi (yellow card) 80'	Report	Esmaeili (yellow card) 80'	Stadium: Imam Khomeini Stadium; Attendance: 0 Referee: Seyyed Mehdi Seyyad Ali

6 July 2021 26	Esteghlal	2–1	Tractor	Tehran
19:15 IRDT (UTC+04:30)	Naderi (yellow card) 45'; Mohammadi 55' (o.g.); Ghayedi 59'; Gholami (yellow card) 73'	Report	Abbaszadeh (yellow card) 37'; Akhbari (yellow card) 55'; Ghaderi (yellow card) 90'; Salami (yellow card) 90+1'; Asadi 90+5'	Stadium: Azadi Stadium; Attendance: 0 Referee: Payam Heydari

10 July 2021 27	Saipa	0–2	Esteghlal	Tehran
19:50 IRDT (UTC+04:30)	Nikkhoui (yellow card) 45'; Aliyari (yellow card) 54'	Report	Motahari 79' (pen.), 87'	Stadium: Shahid Dastgerdi Stadium; Attendance: 0 Referee: Morteza Mansourian

20 July 2021 28	Esteghlal	1–0	Naft MIS	Tehran
21:15 IRDT (UTC+04:30)	Khaghani 7'	Report	Mirjavan (yellow card) 64'; Hosseini (yellow card) 73'	Stadium: Azadi Stadium; Attendance: 0 Referee: Mohammad Hossein Torabian

25 July 2021 29	Nassaji	1–3	Esteghlal	Qaem Shahr
21:15 IRDT (UTC+04:30)	Eslami 17'; Kalantari (yellow card) 23'; Janmaleki (yellow card) 38'	Report	Ghafouri 45' (pen.), 51'; Karimzadeh 83'; Khadempour (yellow card) 61'; Mazaheri (yellow card) 71'; Moradi (red card) 71'	Stadium: Vatani Stadium; Attendance: 0 Referee: Bijan Heydari

30 July 2021 30	Esteghlal	1–2	Sepahan	Tehran
21:15 IRDT (UTC+04:30)	Ghafouri (yellow card) 69'; Moradmand (yellow card) 72'; Mehdipour 90+1'	Report	Mohebi (yellow card) 44'; Gvelesiani (yellow card) 45'; Salmani 54'; Esmaeilifar (yellow card) 65'; Shahbazzadeh 85'; Karimi (yellow card) 81' (yellow-red card) 90+1'	Stadium: Azadi Stadium; Attendance: 0 Referee: Payam Heydari

==== Score overview ====
Win Draw Loss

Opposition	Home score	Away score	Double
Aluminium Arak	2–0	0–0	2–0
Foolad	1–0	1–2	2–2
Gol Gohar	2–0	2–1	4–1
Machine Sazi	1–0	2–0	3–0
Mes Rafsanjan	2–0	1–1	3–1
Naft MIS	1–0	1–1	2–1
Nassaji	1–0	3–1	4–1
Paykan	0–0	0–0	0-0
Persepolis	2–2	0–1	2–3
Saipa	0–1	2–0	2–1
Sanat Naft	1–1	1–0	2–1
Sepahan	1–2	0–2	1–4
Shahr Khodro	2–0	2–0	4–0
Tractor	2–1	3–1	5–2
Zob Ahan	0–2	0–0	0–2

=== Hazfi Cup ===
11 March 2021 Round of 32	Paykan	1–2	Esteghlal	Shahre Qods
17:30 IRST (UTC+03:30)	Roustaei (yellow card) 10'; Eidi (yellow card) 14'; Salehi 58'; Mohammadi (yellow card) 60'	Report	Diabaté 16' (pen.); Daneshgar (yellow card) 34' (goal) 38'	Stadium: Shahr-e Qods Stadium; Attendance: 0 Referee: Hamid Hajmalek

19 May 2021 Round of 16	Esteghlal	2–1	Zob Ahan	Tehran
19:35 IRDT (UTC+04:30)	Esmaeili 55', 66'	Report	Gordan (yellow card) 55'; Bjedov 63'	Stadium: Azadi Stadium; Attendance: 0 Referee: Moud Bonyadifar

15 July 2021 Quarter-final	Persepolis	0–0 (a.e.t.) (3–4 p)	Esteghlal	Tehran
19:45 IRDT (UTC+04:30)	Moghanlou (yellow card) 23'; Nemati (yellow card) 79'	Report	Moradmand (yellow card) 2'	Stadium: Azadi Stadium; Attendance: 0 Referee: Alireza Faghani; Man of the Match: Siavash Yazdani
	Penalties
	Torabi (penalty scored); Kanaanizadegan (penalty scored); Aghaei (penalty scored); Alekasir (penalty missed); Abdi (penalty missed)		(penalty scored) Ghafouri; (penalty scored) Esmaeili; (penalty scored) Moradi; (penalty scored) Motahari; (penalty missed) Ghayedi

4 August 2021 Semi-final	Esteghlal	2–1	Gol Gohar	Tehran
19:30 IRDT (UTC+04:30)	Daneshgar (yellow card) 45'; Ghafouri 74' (pen.), 82' (pen.); Hosseini (yellow card) 90+4'	Report	Alizadeh (yellow card) 1'; Aghajanpour (yellow card) 45'; Pourali 45'; Zakipour (yellow card) 79'	Stadium: Azadi Stadium; Attendance: 0 Referee: Seyyed Vahid Kazemi

8 August 2021 Final	Foolad	0–0 (a.e.t.) (4–2 p)	Esteghlal	Isfahan
20:30 IRDT	Abshak (yellow card) 81'; Niknafs (yellow card) 96'	Report	Rigi (yellow card) 5'; Yazdani (yellow card) 85'; Moradmand (yellow card) 94'	Stadium: Naghsh-e Jahan Stadium; Attendance: 0 Referee: Bijan Heydari
	Penalties
	(penalty scored) Mousavi; (penalty scored) Niknafs; (penalty scored) Ansari; (penalty scored) Abdollahzadeh		(penalty scored) Ghafouri; (penalty missed) Esmaeili; (penalty scored) Mehdipour; (penalty missed) Shojaeian

=== AFC Champions League ===
==== Group stage ====
Pos	Team	Pld	W	D	L	GF	GA	GD	Pts	Qualification	EST	DUH	AHL	SHO
1	(Iran) Esteghlal	6	3	2	1	14	8	+6	11	Advance to Round of 16	—	2–2	5–2	1–0
2	(Qatar) Al-Duhail	6	2	3	1	11	9	+2	9		4–3	—	1–1	2–0
3	(Saudi Arabia) Al-Ahli (H)	6	2	3	1	9	8	+1	9		0–0	1–1	—	2–1
4	(Iraq) Al-Shorta	6	1	0	5	3	12	−9	3		0–3	2–1	0–3	—

Source: AFC
Rules for classification: Tiebreakers
(H) Hosts

15 April 2021 1	Esteghlal (Iran)	5–2	(Saudi Arabia) Al-Ahli	Jeddah, Saudi Arabia
01:45 UTC+4:30 IRDT	Esmaeili 5'; Naderi 54'; Ghayedi 67', 86'; Diabaté 89'	Report	Al Somah 27', 79'	Stadium: Sports Hall; Referee: Ahmed Al-Ali (Jordan)

18 April 2021 2	Al-Shorta (Iraq)	0–3	(Iran) Esteghlal	Jeddah, Saudi Arabia
23:15 UTC+3	Naderi 44'; Esmaeili 55'; Diabaté 65'	Report		Stadium: Sports Hall; Referee: Nivon Robesh Gamini (Sri Lanka)

21 April 2021 3	Al-Duhail (Qatar)	4–3	(Iran) Esteghlal	Jeddah, Saudi Arabia
20:45 UTC+3	Olunga 10', 27', 85'; Al-Ahrak 43'	Report	Motahari 4'; Diabaté 34'; Esmaeili 74'	Stadium: Sports Hall; Referee: Ahmed Al-Ali (Jordan)

24 April 2021 4	Esteghlal (Iran)	2–2	(Qatar) Al-Duhail	Jeddah, Saudi Arabia
23:15 UTC+3	Diabaté 27' (pen.); Ghayedi 61'	Report	Olunga 45+3' (pen.), 59'	Stadium: Sports Hall; Referee: Muhammad Taqi (Singapore)

27 April 2021 5	Al-Ahli (Saudi Arabia)	0–0	(Iran) Esteghlal	Jeddah, Saudi Arabia
23:15 UTC+3		Report		Stadium: Sports Hall; Referee: Ryuji Sato (Japan)

30 April 2021 6	Esteghlal (Iran)	1–0	(Iraq) Al-Shorta	Jeddah, Saudi Arabia
20:45 UTC+3	Diabaté 14' (pen.)	Report		Stadium: Sports Hall; Referee: Sivakorn Pu-udom (Thailand)

== Statistics ==
=== Squad statistics ===
No.	Pos	Nat	Player	Total		Pro League		Hazfi Cup		Champions League	
No.	Pos	Nat	Player	Apps	Goals	Apps	Goals	Apps	Goals	Apps	Goals
1	GK	(Iran)	Hossein Hosseini	14	0	11	0	3	0	0	0
2	DF	(Iran)	Mohammad Naderi	32	3	23	1	5	0	4	2
3	DF	(Iran)	Mohammad Hossein Moradmand	32	1	24	1	4	0	4	0
4	DF	(Iran)	Siavash Yazdani	28	0	18	0	5	0	5	0
5	DF	(Iran)	Aref Gholami	28	0	20	0	3	0	5	0
6	MF	(Iran)	Masoud Rigi	36	0	25	0	5	0	6	0
7	FW	(Mali)	Cheick Diabaté	20	8	13	2	1	1	6	5
8	MF	(Iran)	Farshid Esmaeili	32	6	22	1	5	2	5	3
9	MF	(Iran)	Mehdi Mehdipour	33	2	23	2	5	0	5	0
10	FW	(Iran)	Mehdi Ghayedi	40	9	29	6	5	0	6	3
11	MF	(Iran)	Dariush Shojaeian	22	0	17	0	1	0	4	0
12	GK	(Iran)	Mohammad Rashid Mazaheri	27	0	19	0	2	0	6	0
15	MF	(Iran)	Sina Khadempour	2	0	2	0	0	0	0	0
17	FW	(Iran)	Arman Ramezani	16	2	12	2	1	0	3	0
20	DF	(Iran)	Ahmad Mousavi	24	1	19	1	1	0	4	0
21	DF	(Iran)	Vouria Ghafouri	33	8	22	6	5	2	6	0
22	MF	(Iran)	Babak Moradi	17	0	11	0	4	0	2	0
27	DF	(Iran)	Matin Karimzadeh	16	1	15	1	1	0	0	0
33	DF	(Croatia)	Hrvoje Milic	18	1	12	1	1	0	5	0
41	DF	(Iran)	Arash Dajliri	2	0	2	0	0	0	0	0
66	MF	(Iran)	Saeid Mehri	10	0	6	0	0	0	4	0
70	DF	(Iran)	Mohammad Daneshgar	28	2	25	1	3	1	0	0
72	FW	(Iran)	Arsalan Motahari	38	8	29	7	5	0	4	1
79	MF	(Iran)	Sobhan Khaghani	15	2	11	2	2	0	2	0
88	MF	(Iran)	Arash Rezavand	38	0	27	0	5	0	6	0
Players transferred/loaned out during the season
14	MF	(Iran)	Farshid Bagheri	10	1	10	1	0	0	0	0
42	MF	(Iran)	Fardin Rabet	3	0	3	0	0	0	0	0
71	FW	(Iran)	Mohammad Hossein Fallah	3	0	3	0	0	0	0	0
99	FW	(Iran)	Sajjad Aghaei	1	0	1	0	0	0	0	0

Last updated: 10 August 2021
Source: Competitions

=== Goals ===
The list is sorted by shirt number when total goals are equal.

Rank	Player	Pro League	Hazfi Cup	Champions League	Total
1	(Iran) Mehdi Ghayedi	6	0	3	9
2	(Mali) Cheick Diabaté	2	1	5	8
2	(Iran) Vouria Ghafouri	6	2	0	8
2	(Iran) Arsalan Motahari	7	0	1	8
4	(Iran) Farshid Esmaeili	1	2	3	6
6	(Iran) Mohammad Naderi	1	0	2	3
7	(Iran) Arman Ramezani	2	0	0	2
7	(Iran) Mohammad Daneshgar	1	1	0	2
7	(Iran) Mehdi Mehdipour	2	0	0	2
7	(Iran) Sobhan Khaghani	2	0	0	2
11	(Iran) Mohammad Hossein Moradmand	1	0	0	1
11	(Iran) Ahmad Mousavi	1	0	0	1
11	(Croatia) Hrvoje Milić	1	0	0	1
11	(Iran) Matin Karimzadeh	1	0	0	1
Own goals		2	0	0	2
Total		36	6	14	56

Last updated: 10 August 2021.
Source: Competitive matches

=== Clean sheets ===
Rank	Player	Pro League	Hazfi Cup	Champions League	Total
1	(Iran) Mohammad Rashid Mazaheri	10	1	3	14
2	(Iran) Hossein Hosseini	6	1	0	7
Total		16	2	3	21

Last updated: 9 August 2021.
Source: Competitive matches

=== Disciplinary record ===
Includes all competitive matches. Players with 1 card or more are included only.

N	P	Nat.	Name	Pro League			Hazfi Cup			Champions League			Total			Notes
N	P	Nat.	Name	Yellow card	Second yellow card	Red card	Yellow card	Second yellow card	Red card	Yellow card	Second yellow card	Red card	Yellow card	Second yellow card	Red card	Notes
1	GK	(Iran)	Hossein Hosseini				1						1			
2	DF	(Iran)	Mohammad Naderi	7									7			
3	DF	(Iran)	Mohammad Hossein Moradmand	3			2			1			6			
4	DF	(Iran)	Siavash Yazdani				1						1			
5	DF	(Iran)	Aref Gholami	3									3			
6	MF	(Iran)	Masoud Rigi	3			1						4			
7	FW	(Iran)	Cheick Diabaté	1						1			2			
8	MF	(Iran)	Farshid Esmaeili	3									3			
9	MF	(Iran)	Mehdi Mehdipour	2									2			
10	FW	(Iran)	Mehdi Ghayedi	3						1			4			
11	MF	(Iran)	Dariush Shojaeian	4						1			5			
12	GK	(Iran)	Mohammad Rashid Mazaheri	3									3			
14	DF	(Iran)	Farshid Bagheri	1									1			
15	DF	(Iran)	Sina Khadempour	1									1			
20	DF	(Iran)	Ahmad Mousavi	1									1			
21	DF	(Iran)	Vouria Ghafouri	2									2			
22	MF	(Iran)	Babak Moradi	1		1							1		1	
70	DF	(Iran)	Mohammad Daneshgar	4			2						6			
79	MF	(Iran)	Sobhan Khaghani							1			1			
88	MF	(Iran)	Arash Rezavand	7									7			

Last updated: 10 August 2021
Source: Scoreway
Only competitive matches
(yellow card) = Number of bookings; (second yellow card) = Number of sending offs after a second yellow card; (red card) = Number of sending offs by a direct red card.

== See also ==
- 2020–21 Persian Gulf Pro League
- 2020–21 Hazfi Cup
- 2021 AFC Champions League
