= 2021 Hazfi Cup final =

- Event: 2020–21 Hazfi Cup
Foolad	Esteghlal
0	0
- Foolad won 4-2 on penalties
- Date: 8 August 2021
- Venue: Naghsh-e Jahan Stadium, Isfahan
- Attendance: 0

2021 Hazfi Cup final was the final match of the 34th edition of Hazfi Cup that held between Esteghlal and Foolad F.C. at Naghsh-e Jahan Stadium in Isfahan.

Originally, the final was planned to be held at Imam Ali Stadium in Kerman on 9 August. On 26 July, after the draw of semi-finals, Iran Football League Organisation announced that the final match will be held one day earlier on 8 August due to beginning of Muharram. On 1 August 2021, the final venue was also changed due to problems with the field, scoreboard and seats in Imam Ali stadium. The match also played behind closed doors due to the COVID-19 pandemic in Iran.

== Teams ==
Team	City	Previous finals appearances (bold indicates winners)
Foolad	Ahvaz	Debut
Esteghlal	Tehran	12 (**1977**, 1991, **1996**, 1999, **2000**, **2002**, 2004, **2008**, **2012**, 2016, **2018**, 2020)

== Route to the final ==
Foolad			Round	Esteghlal
Opponents	Results	Stadium	Second Stage	Opponents	Results	Stadium
Mashin Sazi	3-0	Shahid Qasem Soleimani Stadium (Away)	Round of 32	Paykan	2-1	Shohadaye Shahr-e Qods Stadium (Away)
Qashqai	2-1	Pars Stadium (Away)	Round of 16	ZobAhan	2-1	Azadi Stadium (Home)
Sepahan	1-1 (a.e.t.) (5-4 p)	Foolad Arena (Home)	Quarter-final	Persepolis	0-0 (a.e.t.) (4–3 p)	Azadi Stadium (Away)
Malavan	2-0	Foolad Arena (Home)	Semi-Final	Gol Gohar	2-1	Azadi Stadium (Home)

=== Foolad ===
Round	Opposition	Score
Round of 32	Mashin Sazi (A)	3-0
Round of 16	Qashqai (A)	2-1
Quarter-final	Sepahan (H)	1-1 (a.e.t.) (5-4 p)
Semi-Final	Malavan (H)	2-0
Key: (H) = Home venue; (A) = Away venue; (N) = Neutral venue

Foolad, as an Iran Pro League club, started in the Round of 32 against another Pro League side Mashin Sazi and won 3–0 with a hattrick from Luciano Pereira Mendes at Shahid Qasem Soleimani Stadium, Tabriz. In the next round, they won an Azadegan League side, Qashqai at Pars Shiraz Stadium 2–1 with both goals from Shervin Bozorg. In the quarter-final round they drew 1–1 against a Pro League club Sepahan at their home stadium, Foolad Arena with a goal from Saleh Hardani in extra times and they won 5–4 in penalty shoot-outs. Mehran Mousavi, Moussa Coulibaly, Hossein Ebrahimi, Chimba and Mohammad Miri scored and Vahid Heydarieh missed their penalties while Mohsen Forouzan saved two penalties as the goalkeeper. In the semi-final they hosted against Malavan, an Azadegan League team, at Foolad Arena with a goals from Vahid Heydarieh and Ayanda Patosi.

=== Esteghlal ===
Round	Opposition	Score
Round of 32	Paykan (A)	2-1
Round of 16	ZobAhan (H)	2-1
Quarter-final	Persepolis (A)	0-0 (a.e.t.) (4-3 p)
Semi-Final	Gol Gohar (H)	2-1
Key: (H) = Home venue; (A) = Away venue; (N) = Neutral venue

Esteghlal, as a Iran Pro League club, started in the Round of 32 against another Pro League side Paykan and won 2–1 with goals from Cheick Diabaté from penalty mark and Mohammad Daneshgar at Shohadaye Shahr-e Qods Stadium. In the next round, they faced another Pro League team ZobAhan at Azadi Stadium and they won 2–1 with goals from Farshid Esmaeili. In the quarter-final round they were drawn with Persepolis to play the 96th Tehran Derby. Like previous season, Esteghlal won this derby match at Azadi Stadium 4–3 in penalty shoot-outs after the 0–0 draw during 120 minutes. Vouria Ghafouri, Farshid Esmaeili, Babak Moradi and Amir Arsalan Motahari scored and Mehdi Ghayedi missed their penalties, while Hossein Hosseini saved one penalty as the goalkeeper. In the semi-final at Azadi Stadium, Esteghlal played with Gol Gohar. Esteghlal won semi-final match 2-1 and Voria Ghafouri scored both goals from penalty mark.
Esteghlal played all of the matches before final against the teams from Iran Pro League. Except the quarter-final match, which tied 0-0, they won all other matches with 2–1 score. Also, after the first match in round of 32, which was played at Shohadaye Shahr-e Qods Stadium, Esteghlal played their matches at Azadi Stadium. This means Esteghlal did not exit from Tehran Province before the Final.

== Details ==
8 August 2021
20:30

Foolad	0-0 (a.e.t.)	Esteghlal
Penalties
Goalkeeper: Mohsen Forouzan; Mehran Mousavi (penalty scored); Zobeir Niknafs (penalty scored); Sasan Ansari (penalty scored); Ahmad Abdollahzadeh (penalty scored)	4-2	Goalkeeper: Mohammad Rashid Mazaheri; (penalty scored) Voria Ghafouri; (penalty missed) Farshid Esmaeili; (penalty scored) Mehdi Mehdipour; (penalty missed) Dariush Shojaeian

Naghsh-e Jahan Stadium, Isfahan
Attendance: 0
Referee: Bijan Heydari

**Foolad**	**Esteghlal**

**Foolad: 4-4-2**
GK	1	(Iran) Ehsan Moradian		(substituted off) 120'
DF	6	(Iran) Zobeir Niknafs	(yellow card) 96'
DF	2	(Iran) Saleh Hardani
DF	13	(Iran) Mohammad Abshak	(yellow card) 81'	(substituted off) 117'
DF	5	(Mali) Moussa Coulibaly		(substituted off) 120'
MF	34	(Iran) Sina Shahabbasi
MF	29	(Brazil) Luciano Pereira Mendes
MF	50	(Iran) Vahid Heydarieh
MF	12	(South Africa) Ayanda Patosi		(substituted off) 115'
FW	10	(Iran) Farshad Ahmadzadeh
FW	30	(Iran) Sasan Ansari
Substitutes:
GK	68	(Iran) Mohsen Forouzan		(substituted on) 120'
MF	91	(Iran) Mohammad Miri		(substituted on) 115'
MF	11	(Iran) Ahmad Abdollahzadeh		(substituted on) 117'
FF	15	(Iran) Mehran Mousavi		(substituted on) 120'
Manager:
(Iran) Javad Nekounam

**Esteghlal: 3-2-4-1**
GK	12	(Iran) Mohammad Rashid Mazaheri
DF	21	(Iran) Voria Ghafouri (c)
DF	4	(Iran) Siavash Yazdani
DF	3	(Iran) Mohammad Hossein Moradmand	(yellow card) 94'
DF	2	(Iran) Mohammad Naderi
DF	27	(Iran) Matin Karimzadeh		(substituted off) 67'
MF	88	(Iran) Arash Rezavand		(substituted off) 91'
MF	79	(Iran) Sobhan Khaghani		(substituted off) 46'
MF	6	(Iran) Masoud Rigi	(yellow card) 5'	(substituted off) 120+2'
MF	8	(Iran) Farshid Esmaeili
FW	10	(Iran) Mehdi Ghayedi
Substitutes:
GK		(Iran) Sina Saeedi Far
MF	9	(Iran) Mehdi Mehdipour		(substituted on) 91'
MF	11	(Iran) Dariush Shojaeian		(substituted on) 120+2'
MF	15	(Iran) Sina Khadempour
DF	20	(Iran) Ahmad Mousavi
MF	22	(Iran) Babak Moradi		(substituted on) 67'
FW	23	(Iran) Arman Ramezani
MF	66	(Iran) Saeid Mehri
FW	72	(Iran) Amir Arsalan Motahari		(substituted on) 46'
Manager:
(Iran) Farhad Majidi

Referee:
(Iran) Bijan Heydari
Assistant Referees:
(Iran) Mohammad Reza Mansouri
(Iran) Hasan Yousefi
Additional AR:
(Iran) Mohammad Rahi
Fourth official:
(Iran) Seyed Reza Mahdavi

Match rules:

- 90 minutes
- 30 minutes of extra-time if necessary
- Penalty shoot-out if scores still level
- Eleven named substitutes
- Maximum of five substitutions in normal time and another substitution in extra time

== See also ==
- 2020–21 Persian Gulf Pro League
- 2020–21 Azadegan League
- 2020–21 Iran Football's 2nd Division
- 2020–21 Iran Football's 3rd Division
- 2021 Hazfi Cup
- Iranian Super Cup
