= Esteghlal F.C. 7–1 Tractor S.C. =

Football match

Esteghlal 7–1 Tractor
- Event: 2022–23 Persian Gulf Pro League
Esteghlal F.C.	Tractor S.C.
7	1
- Date: 18 May 2023
- Venue: Azadi Stadium, Tehran, Iran
- Man of the Match: Mehdi Ghayedi (Esteghlal)
- Referee: Reza Adel
- Attendance: 35,000
- Weather: Clear weather 30 °C (86 °F)

Esteghlal 7–1 Tractor was a football match played on 18 May 2023 at Azadi Stadium in Tehran, Iran, in the final round of the 2022–23 Persian Gulf Pro League. Esteghlal F.C. won 7–1, with Mehdi Ghayedi scoring a hat-trick, and finished third in the league table.

The result remains Tractor's heaviest defeat since the club's establishment in 1970 and was the highest-scoring match of the Persian Gulf Pro League during the period from the league's inception in 2007 until 2025. The match was managed by Ricardo Sá Pinto for Esteghlal and Paco Jémez for Tractor.

Before this match, Tractor's heaviest defeats against Esteghlal had been by four-goal margins. The first occurred in the 1998–99 Azadegan League, when Esteghlal won 5–1 at Azadi Stadium, with Alireza Akbarpour scoring four goals. The second came in the 2000–01 Azadegan League, another 5–1 victory for Esteghlal, with Ali Samereh scoring twice. The third was a 4–0 defeat in the 2001–02 Iran Pro League, also at Azadi Stadium.

The match received widespread coverage in Iranian sports media because of the record margin of victory and its significance in the history of meetings between the two clubs.

== Match details ==
2022–23 Persian Gulf Pro League
18 May 2023
18:00 IRST

Tractor	1–7	Esteghlal
Mohammad Ghanbari 59'	Match report	Mehdi Ghayedi 17' (pen.); Mehdi Ghayedi 43'; Abolfazl Jalali 45+1'; Mehdi Ghayedi 61'; Mohammad Hossein Moradmand 75'; Arash Rezavand 78'; Jafar Salmani 87'

Azadi Stadium, Tehran, Iran
Attendance: 35,000
Referee: Reza Adel
