= Erfan Golmohammadi =

Association football player

Personal information
- Date of birth: 4 April 1999 (age 27)
- Place of birth: Bandar Abbas, Iran
- Height: 1.80 m (5 ft 11 in)
- Position: Forward

Team information
- Current team: Palayesh Naft
- Number: 19

Youth career
- –2018: Albadr

Senior career*
Years	Team	Apps	(Gls)
2018–2020	Shahrdari Bandar Abbas		
2020–2023	Nassaji	20	(0)
2021	→ Esteghlal (loan)	0	(0)
2023–2024	Shahin Bandar Ameri	4	(0)
2024–	Palayesh Naft	16	(3)
- * Club domestic league appearances and goals as of 22 April 2025

Erfan Golmohammadi (Persian: عرفان گل‌محمدی; born 4 April 1999) is an Iranian footballer who plays as a forward for Palayesh Naft in the Azadegan League.

== Club career ==
=== Nassaji Mazandaran ===
He made his debut in Iran Pro League for Nassaji in 5th fixtures of 2020–21 Iran Pro League against Persepolis while he substituted in for Karim Eslami.
