= 2021 Hazfi Cup =

Tournament details
- Country: Iran
- Dates: 19 January 2021 – 8 August 2021
- Teams: 71

Final positions
- Champions: Foolad (1st title)
- Runners-up: Esteghlal

Tournament statistics
- Matches played: 70
- Goals scored: 154 (2.2 per match)

The 2021 Hazfi Cup was the 34th season of the Iranian football knockout competition.

The competition began in January 2021 and the final was played on August 8, 2021. Foolad won their first title after defeating Esteghlal in the final.

== Participating teams ==
A total of 71 teams (out of a possible total of 96 eligible teams) participated. The teams were divided into four main groups.

- 16 teams of the Persian Gulf Pro League: entering at the Round of 32.
- 13 teams (out of a possible total of 18 teams) of the Azadegan League: entering at the third round.
- 17 teams (out of a possible total of 28 teams) from the 2nd Division: entering at the second round.
- 25 teams (out of a possible total of 34 teams) from Provincial Leagues: entering from first round.

== Schedule ==
The schedule of the competition is as follows.

Stage	Round	Draw date	Matches dates
First stage	Preliminary round	12 January 2021	19 January 2021
First stage	Round 1	12 January 2021	23–28 January 2021
First stage	Round 2	26 January 2021	6–9 February 2021
First stage	Round 3	9 February 2021	23–25 February 2021
Second Stage	Round of 32	26 February 2021	11–13 March 2021
Second Stage	Round of 16	6 April 2021	29 April 2021; 18–19 May 2021
Second Stage	Quarter-finals	13 June 2021	15, 24 July 2021
Second Stage	Semi-finals	26 July 2021	4 August 2021
Second Stage	Final	26 July 2021	8 August 2021

== First stage ==
=== Preliminary round ===
Number of teams per tier entering this round
Pro League (1)	1. division (2)	2. division (3)	Provincial Leagues (4)	Total
16 / 16	18 / 18	28 / 28	25 / 34	87 / 96

19 January 2021 Preliminary	Zagros Neshinan Bakhtiyari (4)	0–2	Shahrdari Dokooheh Andimeshk (4)	Shahrekord
14:00			Mehdi Derikvandi; Mohammad Jahangiri	Stadium: Enghelab

19 January 2021 Preliminary	Payam Khorasan Jonoobi (4)	3–0	Aboozar Kangan Booshehr (4)	Birjand
14:00				Stadium: Azadi
Note: Aboozar Kangan Booshehr withdrew.

23 January 2021 Preliminary	Heyat Football Baneh (4)	1–2	Foolad Hormozgan (4)	Baneh
14:00				Stadium: Shahid Safari

Notes

=== First round ===
Number of teams per tier entering this round
Pro League (1)	1. division (2)	2. division (3)	Provincial Leagues (4)	Total
16 / 16	18 / 18	28 / 28	22 / 34	84 / 96

23 January 2021 1	Setaregan Azhand Azarbaijan (4)	2–1	Aboozar Basht (4)	Tabriz
14:00				Stadium: Marzdaran

23 January 2021 1	Sorkhpooshan Sari (4)	1–1 (4–3 p)	Kanyav Oshnouyeh (4)	Sari
14:00				Stadium: Shohada

23 January 2021 1	Damash Parseh Tehran (4)	1–0	Vahdat Aghasht (4)	Tehran
14:00				Stadium: Atre Sib

23 January 2021 1	Shahrdari Bardeskan (4)	3–0	Shahin Tehran (4)	Bardeskan
14:00				Stadium: Shahid Esmaeili
Note: Shahin Tehran withdrew.

24 January 2021 1	Mi’ad Pars Moghan (4)	0–0 (4–3 p)	Padideh Malekshahi Ilam (4)	Pars Abad
14:00				Stadium: Shahid Kalantari

24 January 2021 1	Sohan Mohammad Qom (4)	3–0	Armak Kish (4)	Qom
14:00	Alireza Ostovari (9', 11', 64')			Stadium: Yadegar Emam

24 January 2021 1	Padma Yadak Iranian Isfahan (4)	2–2 (7–6 p)	Siman Shahrood (4)	Khomeini Shahr
14:00				Stadium: Daneshgah Azad

25 January 2021 1	Helal Ahmar Gerash (4)	3–0	Ettehad Ravansar (4)	Gerash
14:00				Stadium: Takhti
Note: Ettehad Ravansar withdrew.

25 January 2021 1	Darayi Khoramdareh (4)	0–3	Esteghlal Raveh Delijan (4)	Khorramdareh
14:00				Stadium: Shahid Khorrami
Note: Darayi Khoramdareh withdrew.

26 January 2021 1	Shahrdari Dokooheh Andimeshk (4)	3–0	Payam Khorasan Jonoobi (4)
14:00	Mehdi Bagri; Mohsen Kazemi; Mohammad Jahangiri

28 January 2021 1	Shahrdari Bandar Anzali (4)	0–3	Foolad Hormozgan (4)
14:00
Note: Shahrdari Bandar Anzali withdrew.

Notes

=== Second round ===
17 teams from the Second Division entered this round.

Number of teams per tier entering this round
Pro League (1)	1. division (2)	2. division (3)	Provincial Leagues (4)	Total
16 / 16	18 / 18	17 / 28	11 / 34	62 / 96

7 February 2021 2	Shahin Bandar Ameri (3)	3–0	Nirooye Zamini (3)	Tangestan
14:00				Stadium: Shohadaye Ahrom
Note: Nirooye Zamini withdrew.

6 February 2021 2	Avalan Kamyaran (3)	2–0	Sorkhpooshan Sari (4)	Kamyaran
14:00				Stadium: Azadi

7 February 2021 2	Shahid Ghandi Yazd (3)	5–0	Padma Yadak Iranian Isfahan (4)	Yazd
14:00				Stadium: Shahid Nasiri

7 February 2021 2	Oghab Tehran (3)	0–1	Shahrdari Mahshahr (3)	Baghershahr
14:00				Stadium: Atre Sib

7 February 2021 2	Esteghlal Raveh Delijan (4)	0–2	Shahrdari Bardeskan (4)	Arak
14:00				Stadium: 5th Mordad

7 February 2021 2	Espad Tehran (3)	0–1	Milad Mehr Iranian (3)	Tehran
14:00				Stadium: Keshvari

7 February 2021 2	PAS Hamedan (3)	4–1	Mi’ad Pars Moghan (4)	Hamedan
14:00				Stadium: Haji Babayi

7 February 2021 2	Sardar Bookan (3)	3–1	Helal Ahmar Gerash (4)	Bookan
14:00				Stadium: Khatam-al-Anbiya

7 February 2021 2	Foolad Novin Ahvaz (3)	0–0 (7–6 p)	Mes Shahre Babak (3)	Ahvaz
14:00				Stadium: Foolad Arena

6 February 2021 2	Shahrdari Bam (3)	3–0	Setaregan Azhand Azarbaijan (4)	Bam
14:00				Stadium: Aege Jadid

6 February 2021 2	Sohan Mohammad Qom (4)	1–2	Damash Parseh Tehran (4)	Qom
14:00				Stadium: Yadegar Imam

8 February 2021 2	Mes Novin Kerman (3)	2–0	Shams Azar Qazvin (3)	Kerman
14:00				Stadium: Imam Ali

7 February 2021 2	Vista Toorbin (3)	1–0	Foolad Hormozgan (4)	Tehran
14:00				Stadium: Ghadir

7 February 2021 2	Shohadaye Babolsar (3)	1–2	Shahrdari Dokooheh Andimeshk (4)
14:00

Notes

=== Third round ===
18 teams from the Azadegan League entered this round.

Number of teams per tier entering this round
Pro League (1)	1. division (2)	2. division (3)	Provincial Leagues (4)	Total
16 / 16	13 / 18	11 / 28	3 / 34	43 / 96

25 February 2021 3	Esteghlal Molasani (2)	1–0	Baadraan Tehran (2)	Ahvaz
14:00				Stadium: Takhti

24 February 2021 3	Kheybar Khorramabad (2)	0–0 (4–2 p)	Shahid Ghandi Yazd (3)	Khorramabad
14:00				Stadium: Takhti

23 February 2021 3	Milad Mehr Iranian (3)	0–2	Avalan Kamyaran (3)	Eslamshahr
14:00				Stadium: Shohada

25 February 2021 3	Gol Reyhan (2)	0–1	Mes Novin Kerman (3)	Karaj
14:00				Stadium: Enghelab

25 February 2021 3	Qashqai Shiraz (2)	1–0	Foolad Novin Ahvaz (3)	Shiraz
14:00				Stadium: Pars

25 February 2021 3	Mes Kerman (2)	0–0 (4–2 p)	Chooka Talesh (2)	Kerman
14:00				Stadium: Imam Ali

25 February 2021 3	Navad Urmia (2)	0–1	Pars Jonoubi Jam (2)	Urumia
14:00				Stadium: Takhti

25 February 2021 3	Malavan (2)	3–1	Rayka Babol (2)	Bandar Anzali
14:00				Stadium: Takhti

23 February 2021 3	PAS Hamedan (3)	3–0	Shahrdari Bam (3)	Hamedan
14:00				Stadium: Haji Babayi

23 February 2021 3	Shahrdari Mahshahr (3)	1–0	Shahrdari Dokooheh Andimeshk (4)	Mahshahr
14:00				Stadium: Shohada

24 February 2021 3	Damash Parseh Tehran (4)	2–1	Sardar Bookan (3)	Tehran
14:00				Stadium: Atr Sib

Notes

- Byes to the fourth round: Havadar Pakdasht (2), Khooshe Talaei Saveh (2), Shahin Bandar Ameri (3), Shahrdari Bardeskan (4) and Vista Toorbin (3).

== Second stage ==
=== Bracket ===
Fourth round (round of 32); 11–13 March 2021
Mashin Sazi	0
Foolad	3
Avalan Kamyaran	0 (9)
Qashqai	0 (10)
Sepahan	2
Mes Rafsanjan	1
Shahrdari Bardeskan	0
Khooshe Talaei	3
Malavan	2
Vista Toorbin	1
Nassaji	0 (8)
Saipa	0 (7)
Naft Masjed Soleyman	0 (3)
Kheybar	0 (4)
Sanat Naft	4
Damash Parseh Tehran	0
Mes Novin Kerman	0
Persepolis	3
Esteghlal Mollasani	0 (3)
Shahin Bandar Ameri	0 (4)
Paykan	1
Esteghlal	2
ZobAhan	2
Padideh	1
Pars Jonoubi	3
PAS	0
Gol Gohar (a.e.t.)	2
Mes Kerman	1
Aluminium	0 (5)
Havadar	0 (4)
Tractor	3
Shahrdari Mahshahr	0

Fifth round (round of 16); 29 April 2021; 18–19 May 2021
Qashqai	1
Foolad	2
Khooshe Talaei	0
Sepahan (a.e.t.)	2
Nassaji	0
Malavan	1
Kheybar	1
Sanat Naft	0
Shahin Bandar Ameri	1
Persepolis	4
Esteghlal	2
ZobAhan	1
Gol Gohar	3
Pars Jonoubi	0
Aluminium	2
Tractor	0

Sixth round (quarter-final); 15 July 2021; 24 July 2021
Foolad	1 (5)
Sepahan	1 (4)
Malavan	0 (4)
Kheybar	0 (3)
Persepolis	0 (3)
Esteghlal	0 (4)
Gol Gohar	3
Aluminium	1

Semi-final; 4 August 2021
Foolad	2
Malavan	0
Esteghlal	2
Gol Gohar	1

Final; 8 August 2021
Foolad	0 (4)
Esteghlal	0 (2)

=== Fourth round (round of 32) ===
The 16 teams from Iran Pro League entered the competition from the second stage.

Number of teams per tier entering this round
Pro League (1)	1. division (2)	2. division (3)	Provincial Leagues (4)	Total
16 / 16	8 / 18	6 / 28	2 / 34	32 / 96

12 March 2021 4	Aluminium Arak (1)	0–0 (a.e.t.) (5–4 p)	Havadar Tehran (2)	Arak
15:00		Report		Stadium: Imam Khomeini Stadium; Referee: Amir Ayar

11 March 2021 4	Zob Ahan (1)	2–1	Shahr Khodro (1)	Isfahan
15:00	M. Haghdoust 8'; M. Jahani 86'	Report	V. Mohammadzadeh; 89' (o.g.)	Stadium: Foolad Shahr Stadium; Referee: Javad Rahimzadeh

13 March 2021 4	Sanat Naft (1)	4–0	Damash Parseh Tehran (4)	Abadan
15:30		Report		Stadium: Takhti Stadium; Referee: Masood Haghighi

11 March 2021 4	Nassaji (1)	0–0 (a.e.t.) (8–7 p)	Saipa (1)	Qaemshahr
15:15		Report		Stadium: Vatani Stadium; Referee: Hossein Zamani
	Penalties
	Goalkeeper: Saeid Jalali Rad; Hamed Shiri (penalty scored); Hassan Najafi (penalty scored); Sajjad Aghaei (penalty scored); Ali Al Kasir (penalty missed); Akbar Sadeghi (penalty missed); Saeid Beigi (penalty scored); Mojtaba Bijan (penalty missed); Ali Davaran (penalty scored); Ali Zarei (penalty scored); Reza Dehghani (penalty scored); Saeid Jalali Rad (penalty scored)		Goalkeeper: Kourosh Maleki; (penalty scored) Mehrdad Abdi; (penalty missed) Mohammad Sadegh Barani; (penalty missed) Hossein Maleki; (penalty scored) Hossein Mahini; (penalty scored) Majid Aliyari; (penalty scored) Kamal Al Din Nikkhouy; (penalty missed) Reza Jafari; (penalty scored) Mahyar Jabbari; (penalty scored) Amir Ali Sadeghi; (penalty scored) Reza Aliyari; (penalty missed) Kourosh Maleki

12 March 2021 4	Malavan (2)	2–1	Vista Toorbin (3)	Bandar Anzali
15:00		Report		Stadium: Takhti Stadium; Referee: Mehdi Najjar

11 March 2021 4	Peykan (1)	1–2	Esteghlal (1)	Shahre Qods
17:30	E. Salehi 58'	Report	Ch. Diabaté 16' (pen.); M. Daneshgar 38'	Stadium: Shahr-e Qods Stadium; Referee: Hamid Haj Malek

12 March 2021 4	Sepahan (1)	2–1	Mes Rafsanjan (1)	Isfahan
17:30		Report		Stadium: Naghsh-e Jahan Stadium; Referee: Meysam Heidari

12 March 2021 4	Esteghlal Molasani (2)	0–0 (a.e.t.) (3–4 p)	Shahin Bandar Ameri (3)	Ahvaz
15:00		Report		Stadium: Takhti Stadium; Referee: Ali Sam

12 March 2021 4	Naft Masjed Soleyman (1)	0–0 (a.e.t.) (3–4 p)	Kheybar Khorramabad (2)	Masjed Soleyman
16:45		Report		Stadium: Behnam Mohammadi Stadium; Referee: Mostafa Binesh

11 March 2021 4	Gol Gohar (1)	2–1 (a.e.t.)	Mes Kerman (2)	Sirjan
15:00	A. Ashouri 23'; A. Ebrahimi 112'	Report	M. Safia 90+4'	Stadium: Shahid Soleymani; Referee: Seyed Reza Mahdavi

12 March 2021 4	Tractor (1)	3–0	Shahrdari Mahshahr (3)	Tabriz
15:30		Report		Stadium: Yadegar-e Emam Stadium; Referee: Saeid Vafapisheh
Note: Shahdari Mahshahr were unable to travel to Tabriz, therefore Tractor progressed to the next round.

12 March 2021 4	Shahrdari Bardeskan (4)	0–3	Khooshe Talaei Saveh (2)	Mashhad
14:30		Report		Stadium: Samen Al-Aeme Stadium; Referee: Farzin Tamizi

12 March 2021 4	Mes Novin Kerman (3)	0–3	Persepolis (1)	Kerman
15:00		Report	Kamyabinia 38' Alishah 58', 64'	Stadium: Shahid Bahonar Stadium; Referee: Abbas Raaki

12 March 2021 4	Pars Jonoubi Jam (2)	3–0	PAS Hamedan (3)	Jam
15:00		Report		Stadium: Takhti Stadium; Referee: Peyman Farrokhi Mehr
Note: PAS Hamedan withdrew.

12 March 2021 4	Avalan Kamyaran (3)	0–0 (a.e.t.) (9–10 p)	Qashqai Shiraz (2)	Kamyaran
15:00		Report		Stadium: Azadi; Referee: Farhad Ghasemi

11 March 2021 4	Mashin Sazi (1)	0–3	Foolad (1)	Tabriz
15:15		Report	L. Pereira 64' (pen.), 80', 90'	Stadium: Shahid Qasem Soleimani Stadium; Referee: Seyed Ali Asghar Momeni

=== Fifth round (round of 16) ===
Number of teams per tier entering this round
Pro League (1)	1. division (2)	2. division (3)	Provincial Leagues (4)	Total
10 / 16	5 / 18	1 / 28	0 / 34	16 / 96

19 May 2021 5	Esteghlal (1)	2–1	Zob Ahan (1)	Tehran
19:35	Farshid Esmaeili 55', 66'	Report	Darko Bjedov 63'	Stadium: Azadi Stadium; Referee: Moud Bonyadifar

29 April 2021 5	Gol Gohar (1)	3–0	Pars Jonoubi Jam (2)	Sirjan
20:30	Godwin Mensha 30'; Younes Shakeri 70'; Amin Pourali 88'	Report		Stadium: Imam Ali Stadium; Referee: Alireza Heydarpanah

19 May 2021 5	Qashqai Shiraz (2)	1–2	Foolad (1)	Shiraz
19:15	Mohammad Khademi 19'	Report	Shervin Bozorg 52', 76'	Stadium: Pars Stadium; Referee: Ahmad Mohammadi

19 May 2021 5	Aluminium Arak (1)	2–0	Tractor (1)	Arak
18:00	Amir Hooshmand 24'; Meysam Majidi (P) 81'	Report		Stadium: Imam Khomeini Stadium; Referee: Yaser Hamrang

18 May 2021 5	Shahin Bandar Ameri (3)	1–4	Persepolis (1)	Booshehr
20:30	Milad Daryanavardi 34'	Report	Mehdi Abdi 7'; Ahmad Nourollahi 61'; Mehdi Torabi (P) 80'; Mehdi Abdi 86'	Stadium: Shahid Mahdavi; Referee: Roohollah Sharifi

29 April 2021 5	Khooshe Talaei Saveh (2)	0–2 (a.e.t.)	Sepahan (1)	Saveh
20:45		Report	Mohammad Mohebi 116'; Sajjad Shahbazzadeh 120'	Stadium: Chamran Stadium; Referee: Vahid Zamani

29 April 2021 5	Nassaji (1)	0–1	Malavan (2)	Qaem Shahr
21:00		Report	Zakaria Moradi 36'	Stadium: Vatani Stadium; Referee: Keyvan Alimohammadi

29 April 2021 5	Kheybar Khorramabad (2)	1–0	Sanat Naft Abadan (1)	Khorramabad
21:00	Bahram Ahmadi 47'	Report		Stadium: Takhti Stadium; Referee: Vahid Salehi

=== Sixth round (quarter-finals) ===
Number of teams per tier entering this round
Pro League (1)	1. division (2)	2. division (3)	Provincial Leagues (4)	Total
6 / 16	2 / 18	0 / 28	0 / 34	8 / 96

15 July 2021 6	Persepolis (1)	0–0 (a.e.t.) (3–4 p)	Esteghlal (1)	Tehran
19:45				Stadium: Azadi Stadium; Referee: Alireza Faghani
	Penalties
	Goalkeeper: Hamed Lak; Mehdi Torabi (penalty scored); Hossein Kanaanizadegan (penalty scored); Saeid Aghaei (penalty scored); Issa Alekasir (penalty missed); Mehdi Abdi (penalty missed)		Goalkeeper: Hossein Hosseini; (penalty scored) Voria Ghafouri; (penalty scored) Farshid Esmaeili; (penalty scored) Babak Moradi; (penalty scored) Amir Arsalan Motahari; (penalty missed) Mehdi Ghayedi

15 July 2021 6	Foolad (1)	1–1 (a.e.t.) (5–4 p)	Sepahan (1)	Ahvaz
21:30	Saleh Hardani 93'		Rouhollah Bagheri 107'	Stadium: Foolad Arena; Referee: Bijan Heydari
	Penalties
	Goalkeeper: Mohsen Forouzan; Mehran Mousavi (penalty scored); Moussa Coulibaly (penalty scored); Vahid Heydarieh (penalty missed); Hossein Ebrahimi (penalty scored); Luciano Pereira Mendes (Chimba) (penalty scored); Mohammad Miri (penalty scored)		Goalkeeper: Payam Niazmand; (penalty scored) Giorgi Gvelesiani; (penalty scored) Danial Esmaeilifar; (penalty missed) Mohammad Mohebi; (penalty scored) Yasin Salmani; (penalty scored) Ehsan Hajsafi; (penalty missed) Jalaleddin Alimohammadi

24 July 2021 6	Malavan (2)	0–0 (a.e.t.) (4–3 p)	Kheybar (2)	Bandar-e Anzali
20:00				Stadium: Takhti Stadium; Referee: Reza Adel
	Penalties
	Goalkeeper: Reza Heidari; Mahyar Zahmatkesh (penalty scored); Sobhan Pasandide (penalty missed); Rasoul Naserbakht (penalty scored); Zebarjad (penalty scored); Sajjad Bazgir (penalty scored)		Goalkeeper: Mahmoud Ziayi; (penalty missed) Aref Rostami (penalty scored) (penalty scored); (penalty scored) Hossein Madadi; (penalty missed) Ahmad Nasiri

15 July 2021 6	Gol Gohar (1)	3–1	Aluminium Arak (1)	Sirjan
20:30	Reza Shekari 72'; Ahmad Reza Zendehrouh (P) 85'; Saeid Sadeghi 90+3'		Moein Abbasian 10'	Stadium: Imam Ali Stadium; Referee: Moud Bonyadifar

=== Seventh round (semi-finals) ===
Number of teams per tier entering this round
Pro League (1)	1. division (2)	2. division (3)	Provincial Leagues (4)	Total
3 / 16	1 / 18	0 / 28	0 / 34	4 / 96

4 August 2021 7	Esteghlal (1)	2–1	Gol Gohar (1)	Tehran
19:30	Voria Ghafouri 74' (P), 82' (P)		Amin Pourali 45'	Stadium: Azadi Stadium; Referee: Vahid Kazemi

4 August 2021 7	Foolad (1)	2–0	Malavan (2)	Ahvaz
21:00	Vahid Heydarieh 37'; Ayanda Patosi 44'			Stadium: Foolad Arena; Referee: Koopal Nazemi

=== Eighth round (final) ===
Number of teams per tier entering this round
Pro League (1)	1. division (2)	2. division (3)	Provincial Leagues (4)	Total
2 / 16	0 / 18	0 / 28	0 / 34	2 / 96

8 August 2021 8	Foolad (1)	0–0 (a.e.t.) (4–2 p)	Esteghlal (1)	Isfahan
20:30				Stadium: Naghsh-e Jahan Stadium; Referee: Bijan Heydari
	Penalties
	Goalkeeper: Mohsen Forouzan; Mehran Mousavi (penalty scored); Zobeir Niknafs (penalty scored); Sasan Ansari (penalty scored); Ahmad Abdollahzadeh (penalty scored)		Goalkeeper: Mohammad Rashid Mazaheri; (penalty scored) Voria Ghafouri; (penalty missed) Farshid Esmaeili; (penalty scored) Mehdi Mehdipour; (penalty missed) Dariush Shojaeian

== See also ==
- Iran Pro League 2020–21
- Azadegan League 2020–21
- Iran Football's 2nd Division 2020–21
- Iran Football's 3rd Division 2020–21
- Iranian Super Cup
