= Sobhan Khaghani =

Iranian footballer (born 2000)

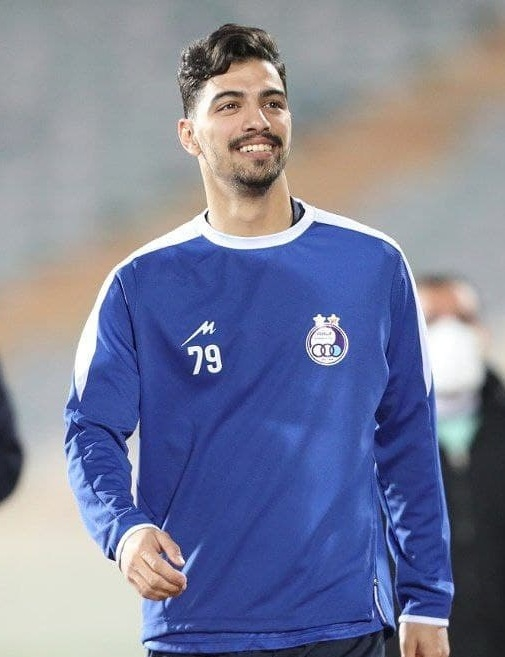
- Khaghani in 2022

Personal information
- Date of birth: 27 January 2000 (age 26)
- Place of birth: Mashhad, Iran
- Height: 1.81 m (5 ft 11 in)
- Position: Winger

Team information
- Current team: Zob Ahan
- Number: 79

Youth career
- Meshki Pooshan

Senior career*
Years	Team	Apps	(Gls)
2017–2018	Meshki Pooshan	6	(0)
2018–2020	Tractor	2	(0)
2020–2023	Esteghlal	25	(2)
2023–	Zob Ahan	21	(1)

International career
2017–2018	Iran U17	1	(0)
2021	Iran U23	2	(0)
- * Club domestic league appearances and goals as of 7 March 2025

Sobhan Khaghani (born 27 January 2000) is an Iranian professional footballer who plays for Iranian club Zob Ahan as a winger.

== Club career ==
Khaghani joined Esteghlal in the summer of 2020. He scored his first goal for the club on his first start against Shahr Khodro on 13 December 2020. On 20 July 2021 he scored his second goal for the club against Naft Masjed Soleyman F.C. This goal is 900th goal in the Esteghlal history.

== International career ==
Khaghani represented Iran U17 at the 2017 FIFA U-17 World Cup in India.

== Personal life ==
Khaghani was born with only one kidney, but he doesn't have a problem to play.

== Career statistics ==
As of 12 November 2023

Appearances and goals by club, season and competition
Club	Season	League			Hazfi Cup		ACL		Total	
Club	Season	League	Apps	Goals	Apps	Goals	Apps	Goals	Apps	Goals
Siah Jamegan	2017–18	Persian Gulf Pro League	6	0	0	0	–		6	0
Tractor	2019–20	Persian Gulf Pro League	2	0	0	0	–		2	0
Esteghlal	2020–21	Persian Gulf Pro League	10	2	2	0	3	0	15	2
Esteghlal	2021–22	Persian Gulf Pro League	13	0	3	0	–		16	0
Esteghlal	2022–23	Persian Gulf Pro League	0	0	0	0	–		0	0
Esteghlal	2023–24	Persian Gulf Pro League	2	0	0	0	–		2	0
Esteghlal	total		25	2	5	0	3	0	31	2
Zob Ahan	2023–24	Persian Gulf Pro League	6	0	0	0	–		6	0
Career total			39	2	5	0	3	0	47	2

== Honours ==
Esteghlal

- Iran Pro League: 2021–22
- Hazfi Cup runner-up: 2020–21, 2022–23
- Iranian Super Cup: 2022
