= Mohammad Hossein Moradmand =

Iranian footballer (born 1993)

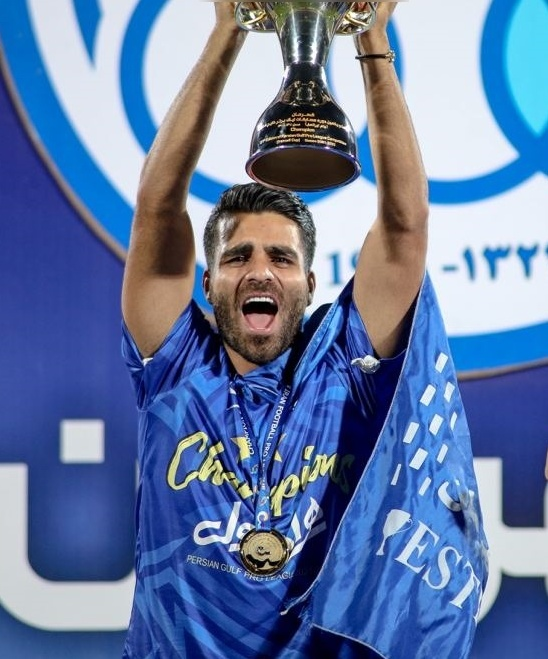

Personal information
- Full name: Mohammad Hossein Moradmand Khorzuqi
- Date of birth: 22 June 1993 (age 33)
- Place of birth: Isfahan, Iran
- Height: 1.85 m (6 ft 1 in)
- Position: Centre back

Team information
- Current team: Sanat Naft Abadan

Youth career
- 2009–2012: Sepahan

Senior career*
Years	Team	Apps	(Gls)
2012–2015	Sepahan	16	(1)
2015–2020	Shahr Khodro	119	(6)
2020–2025	Esteghlal	80	(5)
2022	→ Malavan (loan)	0	(0)
2026	Fajr Sepasi	4	(0)
2026–	Sanat Naft	0	(0)

International career^{‡}
2010–2012	Iran U20	13	(0)
2014–2016	Iran U23	5	(2)
2023	Iran	1	(0)
- * Club domestic league appearances and goals as of 16 April 2025 ‡ National team caps and goals as of 12 September 2023

Mohammad Hossein Moradmand (Persian: محمد حسین مرادمند, born 22 June 1993) is an Iranian professional footballer who plays as a center back for Persian Gulf Pro League club Sanat Naft Abadan and the Iran national team.

== Club career ==
=== Sepahan ===
He joined Sepahan in the summer of 2012. From 2009 to 2012 he was a member of Sepahan under-21 football team.

=== Shahr Khodro(Padideh) ===
He joined Padideh (current Shahr Khodro) team in the season 2015–16 and scored in the first game for this team, which was accompanied by his 90-minute presence against Foolad.

=== Esteghlal ===
His brilliance in the Shahr Khodro team attracted the attention of Esteghlal Club, and finally Moradmand signed a contract with this team on 11 September 2016 and joined Esteghlal.

=== Malavan ===
He joined the Malavan on loan from Esteghlal to perform his military service.

== Club career statistics ==
As of 16 April 2025

Club performance			League		Cup		Continental		Total	
Club	League	Season	Apps	Goals	Apps	Goals	Apps	Goals	Apps	Goals
Iran			League		Hazfi Cup		Asia		Total	
Sepahan	Iran Pro League	2012–13	2	0	0	0	0	0	2	0
Sepahan	Iran Pro League	2013–14	7	0	0	0	0	0	7	0
Sepahan	Iran Pro League	2014–15	7	1	0	0	0	0	7	1
Sepahan	total		16	1	0	0	0	0	16	1
Shahre Khodro	Persian Gulf Pro League	2015–16	28	1	1	0	0	0	29	1
Shahre Khodro	Persian Gulf Pro League	2016–2017	24	1	1	0	0	0	25	1
Shahre Khodro	Persian Gulf Pro League	2017–18	19	1	1	0	0	0	20	1
Shahre Khodro	Persian Gulf Pro League	2018–19	21	0	3	0	0	0	24	0
Shahre Khodro	Persian Gulf Pro League	2019–20	26	3	1	0	3	0	30	3
Shahre Khodro	total		118	6	7	0	3	0	128	6
Esteghlal	Persian Gulf Pro League	2020–21	24	1	4	0	5	0	33	1
Esteghlal	Persian Gulf Pro League	2021–22	15	0	1	0	1	0	17	0
Esteghlal	Persian Gulf Pro League	2022–23	8	2	2	1	0	0	10	3
Esteghlal	Persian Gulf Pro League	2023–24	16	2	1	0	0	0	17	2
Esteghlal	Persian Gulf Pro League	2024–25	17	0	1	0	3	0	21	0
Esteghlal	total		80	5	9	1	9	0	98	6
Career total			214	12	16	1	12	0	242	13

== International career ==
=== U20 ===
He was part of Iran U–20 during 2012 AFC U-19 Championship qualification, 2012 CIS Cup, 2012 AFF U-19 Youth Championship and 2012 AFC U-19 Championship.

=== U23 ===
He invited to Iran U-23 training camp by Nelo Vingada to preparation for Incheon 2014 and 2016 AFC U-22 Championship (Summer Olympic qualification).

=== Senior ===
He made his debut on 12 September 2023 against Angola.

== Honours ==
Sepahan

- Persian Gulf Pro League (1): 2014–15
- Hazfi Cup (1): 2012–13

Esteghlal

- Hazfi Cup Runner-up (1): 2020–21
- Hazfi Cup (1): 2024–25
- Iranian Super Cup (1): 2022
