= Mohammad Hossein Fallah =

Iranian footballer

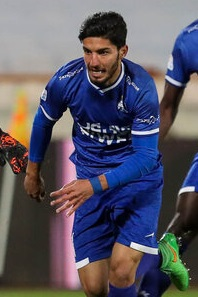

Personal information
- Date of birth: 7 March 2000 (age 26)
- Place of birth: Amol, Mazandaran, Iran
- Height: 1.78 m (5 ft 10 in)
- Position: Winger

Team information
- Current team: Sanat Naft Abadan
- Number: 77

Youth career
- 2017–2018: Paykan
- 2018–2020: Nirooye Zamini
- 2020–2021: Esteghlal

Senior career*
Years	Team	Apps	(Gls)
2020–2021	Esteghlal	3	(0)
2021–2024	Paykan	60	(6)
2024–2026	Chadormalou	19	(1)
2026–	Sanat Naft	8	(1)
- * Club domestic league appearances and goals as of 17 April 2025

Mohammad Hossein Fallah (Persian: محمدحسین فلاح; born 7 March 2000) is an Iranian footballer who plays as a Winger for Sanat Naft Abadan in the Persian Gulf Pro League.

== Club career ==
=== Esteghlal Tehran ===
He made his debut in Iran Pro League for Esteghlal in 12th fixtures of 2020–21 Iran Pro League against Saipa while he substituted in for Dariush Shojaeian.
