= Erfan Pourafraz =

Iranian footballer

Personal information
- Date of birth: 5 April 1991 (age 35)
- Place of birth: Tehran, Iran
- Height: 1.78 m (5 ft 10 in)
- Position: Striker

Team information
- Current team: Be'sat Kermanshah
- Number: 88

Youth career
- 2010–2012: Esteghlal
- 2012–2014: Paykan

Senior career*
Years	Team	Apps	(Gls)
2013–2016	Paykan	16	(1)
2016–2017	Naft Masjed Soleyman	13	(2)
2017–2018	Malavan	11	(1)
2018–2019	Navad Urmia	22	(3)
2019–2020	Baadraan	3	(2)
2020–2021	Zob Ahan	10	(0)
2021	Havadar	3	(6)
2021–2022	Khooshe Talaei	20	(7)
2022–2023	Pars Jonoubi Jam	8	(0)
2023–2024	Fajr Sepasi Shiraz	10	(6)
2024–2025	Pars Jonoubi Jam	10	(2)
2025–	Be'sat Kermanshah	7	(1)
- * Club domestic league appearances and goals as of 11 April 2025

Erfan Pourafraz (Persian: عرفان پورافراز; born 3 September 1991) is an Iranian footballer who plays for Be'sat Kermanshah in the Azadegan League.

== Club career ==
=== Paykan ===
Pourafraz joined Paykan in summer 2013. He made his debut for Paykan on 10 November 2013 against Iranjavan as a starter. He scored his first goal for Paykan in his 2nd appearance for them against Badr Bandar Kong.

== Club career statistics ==
As of 7 August 2014.

Club	Division	Season	League		Hazfi Cup		Asia		Total	
Club	Division	Season	Apps	Goals	Apps	Goals	Apps	Goals	Apps	Goals
Paykan	Pro League	2014–15	0	0	0	0	–	–	0	0
Paykan	Division 1	2015–16	12	1	0	0	–	–	12	1
Career Totals			12	1	0	0	0	0	12	1
