= Mohammad Miri =

Iranian footballer

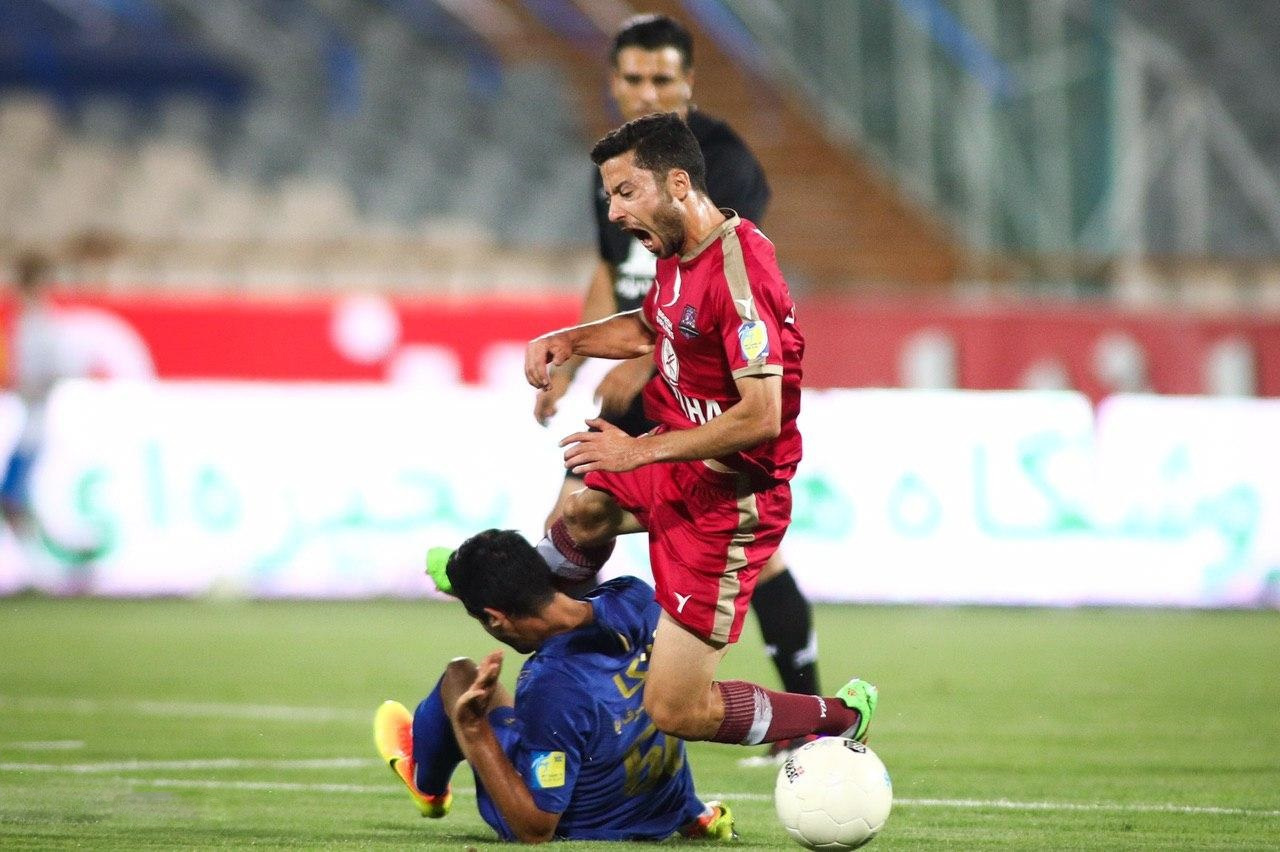
- Mohammad Miri (2020)

Personal information
- Full name: Seyedmohammad Mirilichahi
- Date of birth: 5 March 1990 (age 36)
- Place of birth: Rasht, Iran
- Height: 1.81 m (5 ft 11 in)
- Position: Midfielder

Team information
- Current team: Havadar S.C.
- Number: 91

Senior career*
Years	Team	Apps	(Gls)
–2013	Shahrdari Langaroud		
2013–2014	Mes Songoun		
2014–2015	Khalkhal Dasht		
2015–2017	Sepidrood Rasht		
2017–2018	Khooneh be Khooneh		
2018–2020	Nassaji Mazandaran	52	(4)
2020–2021	Foolad	16	(0)
2021-	Havadar S.C.	53	
- * Club domestic league appearances and goals as of 16 February 2018

Seyedmohammad Mirilichahi (Persian محمد میری; born 5 March 1990) is an Iranian professional football player who plays as a midfielder for Havadar S.C. in the Persian Gulf Pro League.

== Honours ==
Foolad

- Hazfi Cup: 2020–21
