= Ahmad Mousavi =

Iranian footballer (born 1992)

seyed Ahmad Mousavi
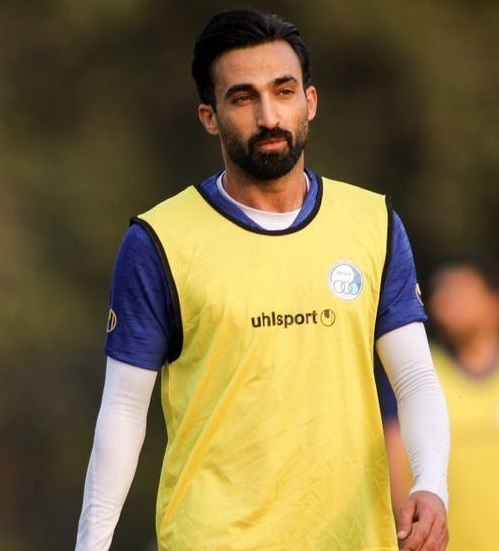
- Mousavi in 2020

Personal information
- Full name: seyed Ahmad Mousavi
- Date of birth: February 4, 1992 (age 34)
- Place of birth: Dorood, Iran
- Height: 1.79 m (5 ft 10 in)
- Position: Right back

Team information
- Current team: Gol Gohar

Senior career*
Years	Team	Apps	(Gls)
2013–2014	Pas Hamedan	15	(0)
2014–2015	Rah Ahan	12	(0)
2015–2017	Khoneh Be Khoneh	38	(3)
2017–2018	Gostaresh Foulad	19	(1)
2018	Machine Sazi	10	(0)
2019–2020	Tractor	10	(0)
2020	Gol Gohar	11	(2)
2020–2021	Esteghlal	19	(1)
2021–	Gol Gohar	0	(0)
- * Club domestic league appearances and goals as of 9 May 2021

Seyed Ahmad Mousavi (Persian: سید احمد موسوی) is an Iranian footballer who plays right back.

== Club career ==
=== Pas Hamedan ===
Mousavi started his career with Pas Hamedan and made 15 appearances for them in 2013–14 Azadegan League.

=== Rah Ahan ===
He joined Rah Ahan in summer 2014 and made his debut for them in first fixture of 2014–15 Iran Pro League against Esteghlal.

== Club career statistics ==
As of 15 August 2014

Club	Division	Season	League		Hazfi Cup		Asia		Total	
Club	Division	Season	Apps	Goals	Apps	Goals	Apps	Goals	Apps	Goals
Pas Hamedan	Division 1	2013–14	15	0	0	0	–	–	15	0
Rah Ahan	Pro League	2014–15	3	0	0	0	–	–	3	0
Career Totals			18	0	0	0	0	0	18	0
