= Matin Karimzadeh =

Iranian footballer (born 1998)

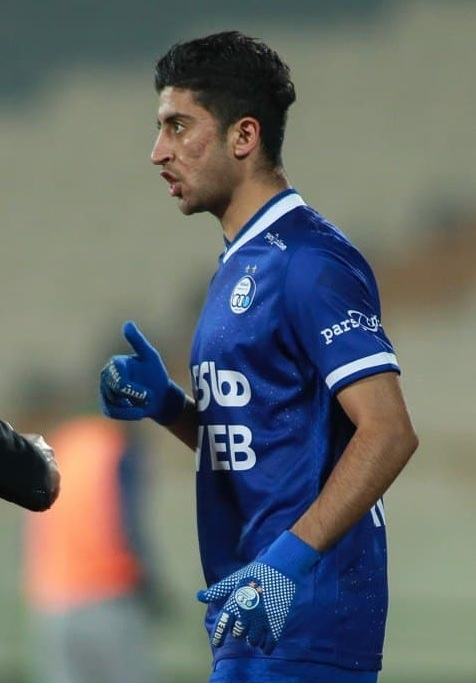
- Karimzadeh with Esteghlal in 2020

Personal information
- Date of birth: 30 June 1998 (age 28)
- Place of birth: Bushehr, Iran
- Height: 1.80 m (5 ft 11 in)
- Positions: Left back; left winger

Team information
- Current team: Sanat Naft Abadan
- Number: 78

Youth career
- 2016–2017: Shahin Bushehr

Senior career*
| Years | Team | Apps | (Gls) |
| 2017–2018 | Shahin Bushehr | 2 | (0) |
| 2018–2020 | Pars Jam | 22 | (1) |
| 2020–2022 | Esteghlal | 16 | (1) |
| 2022 | → Nassaji Mazandaran (loan) | 11 | (1) |
| 2022–2024 | Nassaji Mazandaran | 13 | (0) |
| 2023–2024 | → Esteghlal Khuzestan (loan) | 14 | (0) |
| 2024–2025 | Sanat Naft | 29 | (0) |
| 2025–2026 | Nassaji Mazandaran | 31 | (1) |
| 2026– | Sanat Naft | 9 | (1) |

International career^{‡}
| 2019–2020 | Iran U23 | 4 | (0) |
- * Club domestic league appearances and goals as of 24 November 2021 ‡ National team caps and goals as of 15 January 2020

Matin Karimzadeh (Persian: متین کریم‌زاده; born 30 June 1998) is an Iranian professional footballer who plays as a left-back for Iranian language club Sanat Naft Abadan in the Persian Gulf Pro League.
