= Cheick Diabaté (footballer, born 1988) =

Malian footballer (born 1988)

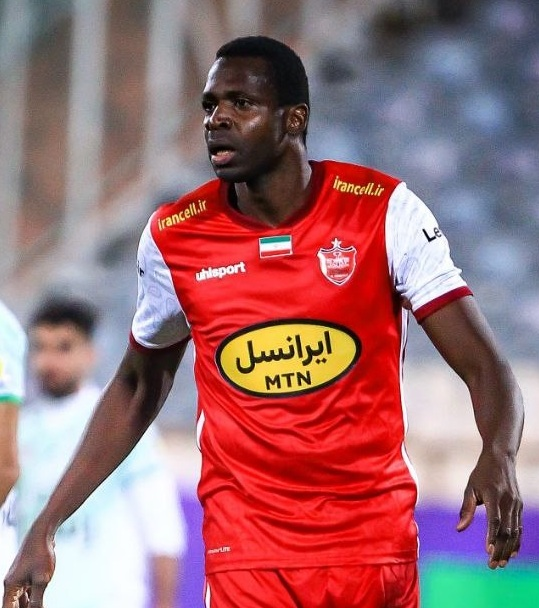
- Diabaté with Persepolis in 2023

Personal information
- Full name: Cheick Tidiane Diabaté
- Date of birth: 25 April 1988 (age 38)
- Place of birth: Bamako, Mali
- Height: 1.94 m (6 ft 4 in)
- Position: Forward

Youth career
- 2000–2006: Centre Salif Keita
- 2006–2008: Bordeaux

Senior career*
Years	Team	Apps	(Gls)
2008–2016	Bordeaux	127	(50)
2008–2009	→ Ajaccio (loan)	30	(14)
2009–2010	→ Nancy (loan)	2	(0)
2016–2018	Osmanlıspor	8	(0)
2017	→ Metz (loan)	14	(8)
2018	→ Benevento (loan)	11	(8)
2018–2019	Emirates	19	(10)
2019–2021	Esteghlal	33	(17)
2021–2022	Al-Gharafa	16	(10)
2022–2023	Persepolis	9	(3)
Total		269	(120)

International career
2005	Mali U-17	3	(3)
2005–2016	Mali	39	(15)
Medal record
Men's football
Representing Mali
Africa Cup of Nations
Third place	2012 Equatorial Guinea-Gabon
Third place	2013 South Africa
- * Club domestic league appearances and goals as of 31 March 2023

Cheick Tidiane Diabaté (born 25 April 1988) is a Malian professional footballer. From 2005 to 2016, he played for the Mali national team internationally.

== Club career ==
=== Bordeaux ===
Diabaté was promoted to the senior squad of Girondins de Bordeaux for the 2008–09 season following a successful season in the CFA, where he made 35 appearances and scored 18 goals. As Bordeaux preferred to field more experienced strikers, manager Laurent Blanc loaned Diabaté out to the Corsica-based and Ligue 2 club AC Ajaccio to enable him to get more playing time.

==== Ajaccio (loan) ====
Diabaté made his debut for AC Ajaccio in their opening match of the 2008–09 Ligue 2 season, in a loss to Châteauroux, playing the full 90 minutes. In the second match, he scored a brace in their 3–1 away win over Stade de Reims. Three weeks later, he scored another brace, this time in a 4–0 home thrashing of Vannes. He scored one goal in each of the following three Ligue 2 matches with Ajaccio earning wins over Brest and Clermont and drawing with Nîmes.

Diabaté's positive play continued throughout the season scoring important match-winning goals in Ligue 2 matches against Guingamp, Lens, Angers, and Boulogne. He also scored a goal in the Derby Corse against SC Bastia, in a 1–1 home Ligue 2 draw. Diabaté finished the season with 14 Ligue 2 goals, which made him the club's top scorer and placed him 4th among the top Ligue 2 scorers of the season; Ajaccio managed to stave off relegation only on the final day of the season.

While on loan to AC Ajaccio, Diabaté had his contract with Bordeaux extended until June 2013.

==== Nancy (loan) ====
Diabaté returned to Bordeaux on 1 July 2009. On 20 July, he was loaned out again, this time to fellow Ligue 1 club Nancy. The striker spent most of the season playing for the reserve team, playing only three matches (two matches in Ligue 1 and one match in the Coupe de la Ligue) for the first team.

==== Return to Bordeaux ====
Diabaté scored two goals in the final of the 2013 Coupe de France to help Bordeaux defeat Evian TG 3–2.

Diabaté had an excellent 2013–14 Ligue 1 season with Bordeaux, registering 12 goals in 25 Ligue 1 matches and scoring in a 1–1 away draw against Toulouse FC, one goal in each of the two rounds of matches against FC Lorient, and a second-half brace in a 4–1 home win against FC Sochaux-Montbéliard.

=== Osmanlıspor ===
On 27 May 2016, Diabaté joined Osmanlıspor on a three-year contract. Having returned from his loan to Metz in the summer, it was reported in mid-August 2017 that he had agreed to the termination of his contract.

==== Metz (loan) ====
On 30 December 2016, the Süper Lig club Osmanlıspor announced that Diabaté had been loaned to Ligue 1 club Metz until the end of the 2016–17 season, with Metz having an option to purchase him. Diabaté helped Metz avoid relegation scoring eight goals in 14 matches and the club expressed interest in signing him permanently in June 2017.

==== Benevento (loan) ====
In January 2018, Diabaté joined Serie A side Benevento on loan for the rest of the 2017–18 season. He scored his first goal in his first match for the Campanian team in a 3–2 win against Crotone. Diabate also scored two goals a piece against Hellas Verona, Juventus, and Sassuolo. His goal scoring form was such that with six goals in three games he equaled a long-standing Serie A record held since 2001 by Dario Hubner. He finished the season with eight goals in 11 games, having the best goal ratio among the players with more than one appearance in Serie A in 2010s, ahead of likes of Edinson Cavani, Romelu Lukaku, Cristiano Ronaldo and Zlatan Ibrahimović.

=== Emirates Club ===
On 18 September 2018, Diabaté joined Emirates Club on a one-year contract.

=== Esteghlal ===
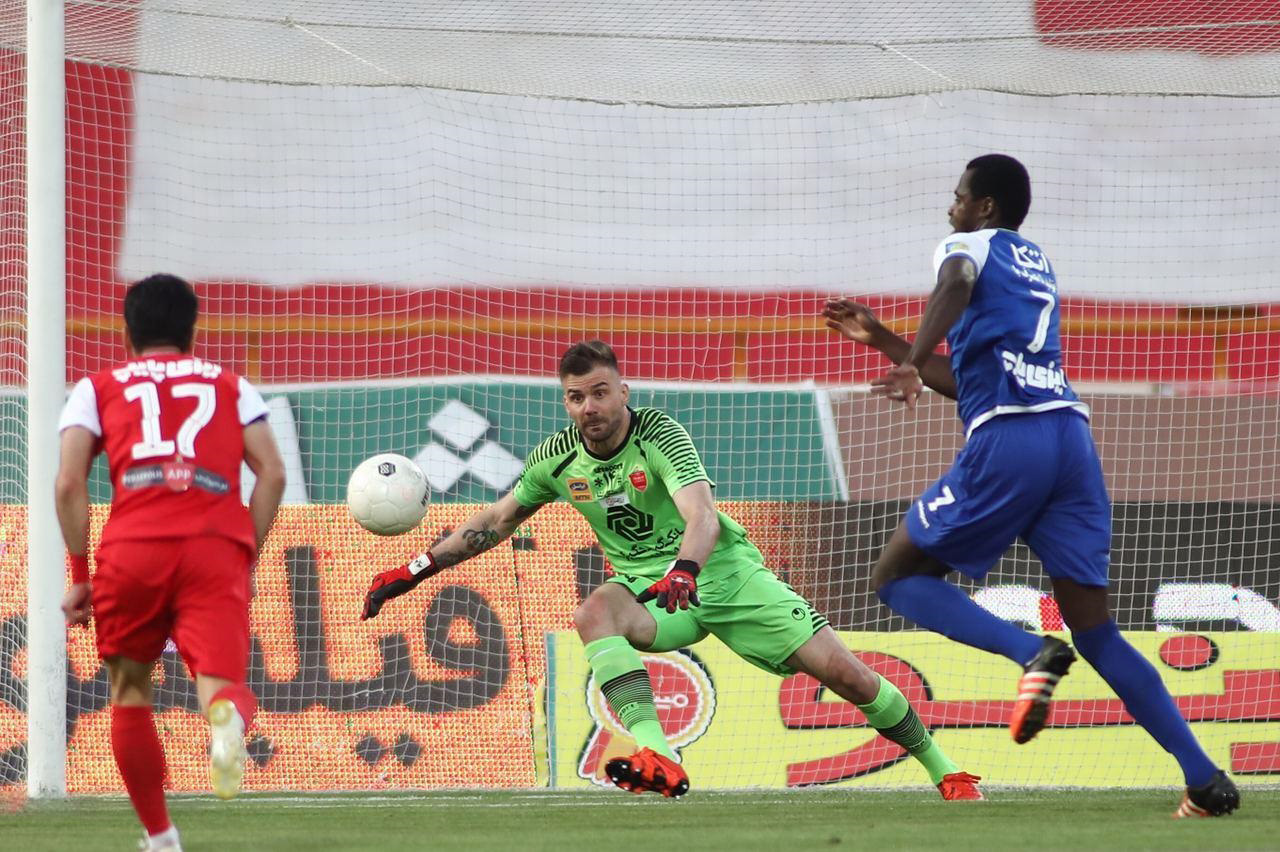
Diabaté (right) playing for Esteghlal in Tehran Derby (August 2020)

On 9 July 2019, Diabaté signed for Iranian club Esteghlal on a two-year contract. He was handed the number 7 shirt. He debuted for the club on 23 August, coming on as 67th-minute substitute for Farshid Esmaeili in a league match against Machine Sazi. Six days later, he made his first start in his first appearance at Azadi Stadium in a 1–1 draw against Foolad. On 1 November, he scored his first goals for Esteghlal, netting a hat-trick in a 4–2 away win against Tractor. He scored a brace in his AFC Champions League debut against Kuwait SC in a 3–0 victory. He ended the season with a tally of 18 goals in all competitions of which his 13 goals in the league made him the top scorer for that season.

=== Al-Gharafa ===
On 17 September 2021, Diabaté joined Qatari club Al-Gharafa.

=== Persepolis ===
On 2 September 2022, Diabaté joined Persian Gulf Pro League side Persepolis on a one-year deal. He received the squad number 25 shirt. Diabaté debuted for the club on 13 October, coming on as 85th-minute substitute for Jürgen Locadia in a league match against Mes Rafsanjan.

== International career ==
Diabaté started out with Mali's national under-17 team where they participated in the 2005 African U-17 Championship. He scored a goal in each of their group stage matches but Mali failed to advance to the knock-out stage. Less than a month after that tournament, he made his senior debut against Liberia in a 2006 World Cup qualifier 5 June 2005, coming on as an 85th-minute substitute for Dramane Coulibaly; Mali won the match 4–1. Diabaté was a member of the Mali side that earned third place at the 2012 Africa Cup of Nations. He finished the tournament as one of the top scorers, having netted three goals in total, including two in the third place play-off against Ghana on 11 February 2012, which Mali won 2–0.

== Career statistics ==
=== Club ===
As of 31 March 2023

Appearances and goals by club, season and competition
Club	Season	League			National cup (Note: Includes Coupe de France, Turkish Cup, Coppa Italia, UAE League Cup and Iranian Hazfi Cup.)		League cup (Note: Includes Coupe de la Ligue.)		Continental (Note: Includes UEFA Europa League and AFC Champions League.)		Total	
Club	Season	Division	Apps	Goals	Apps	Goals	Apps	Goals	Apps	Goals	Apps	Goals
Bordeaux	2010–11	Ligue 1	16	4	2	2	—		—		18	6
Bordeaux	2011–12	Ligue 1	26	8	—		—		—		26	8
Bordeaux	2012–13	Ligue 1	23	8	4	6	—		8	4	35	18
Bordeaux	2013–14	Ligue 1	25	12	—		1	0	2	0	28	12
Bordeaux	2014–15	Ligue 1	15	8	—		2	1	0	0	17	9
Bordeaux	2015–16	Ligue 1	22	10	1	2	1	0	4	1	28	13
Bordeaux	Total		127	50	7	10	4	1	14	5	152	66
Ajaccio (loan)	2008–09	Ligue 2	30	14	—		—		—		30	14
Nancy (loan)	2009–10	Ligue 1	2	0	—		1	0	—		3	0
Osmanlıspor	2016–17	Süper Lig	8	0	3	5	—		5	1	16	6
Metz (loan)	2016–17	Ligue 1	14	8	—		—		—		14	8
Benevento (loan)	2017–18	Serie A	11	8	—		—		—		11	8
Emirates	2018–19	UAE Pro-League	19	10	3	4	—		—		22	14
Esteghlal	2019–20	Persian Gulf Pro League	21	15	2	1	—		5	4	28	20
Esteghlal	2020–21	Persian Gulf Pro League	12	2	1	1	—		6	5	19	8
Esteghlal	Total		33	17	3	2	—		11	9	47	28
Al-Gharafa	2021–22	Qatar Stars League	16	10	4	2	—		2	1	22	13
Persepolis	2022–23	Persian Gulf Pro League	9	3	0	0	—		—		9	3
Career total			269	120	20	23	5	1	32	16	326	160

=== International ===
Scores and results list Mali's goal tally first, score column indicates score after each Diabaté goal.

List of international goals scored by Cheick Diabaté
No.	Date	Venue	Opponent	Score	Result	Competition
1	18 November 2008	Stade Robert Diochon, Rouen, France	Algeria	1–0	1–1	Friendly
2	26 March 2011	Stade du 26 Mars, Bamako, Mali	Zimbabwe	1–0	1–0	2012 Africa Cup of Nations qualification
3	10 August 2011	Stade Mustapha Ben Jannet, Monastir, Tunisia	Tunisia	4–2	4–2	Friendly
4	3 September 2011	Stade du 26 Mars, Bamako, Mali	Cape Verde	1–0	3–0	2012 Africa Cup of Nations qualification
5	3 September 2011	Stade du 26 Mars, Bamako, Mali	Cape Verde	2–0	3–0	2012 Africa Cup of Nations qualification
6	8 October 2011	Samuel Kanyon Doe Sports Complex, Monrovia, Liberia	Liberia	1–1	2–2	2012 Africa Cup of Nations qualification
7	5 February 2012	Stade d'Angondjé, Libreville, Gabon	Gabon	1–1	1–1	2012 Africa Cup of Nations
8	11 February 2012	Estadio de Malabo, Malabo, Equatorial Guinea	Ghana	1–0	2–0	2012 Africa Cup of Nations
9	11 February 2012	Estadio de Malabo, Malabo, Equatorial Guinea	Ghana	2–0	2–0	2012 Africa Cup of Nations
10	8 October 2012	Stade du 26 Mars, Bamako, Mali	Botswana	1–0	3–0	2013 Africa Cup of Nations qualification
11	13 October 2012	Lobatse Stadium, Lobatse, Botswana	Botswana	1–0	4–1	2013 Africa Cup of Nations qualification
12	13 June 2013	Stade du 26 Mars, Bamako, Mali	Benin	2–2	2–2	2014 FIFA World Cup qualification
13	5 March 2014	Stade Municipal Saint-Leu.-la-Forêt, Saint-Leu-la-Forêt, France	Senegal	1–1	1–1	Friendly
14	7 September 2014	Stade du 26 Mars, Bamako, Mali	Malawi	2–0	2–0	2015 Africa Cup of Nations qualification
15	11 November 2015	Stade du 26 Mars, Bamako, Mali	Botswana	1–0	2–0	2018 FIFA World Cup qualification

== Honours ==
Bordeaux

- Coupe de France: 2012–13

Esteghlal

- Hazfi Cup runner-up: 2019–20, 2020–21

Persepolis

- Persian Gulf Pro League: 2022–23
- Hazfi Cup: 2022–23
- Iranian Super Cup: 2023

Mali

- Africa Cup of Nations third place: 2012, 2013

Individual

- Africa Cup of Nations top scorer: 2012 (three goals)
- Coupe de France top scorer: 2012–13 (six goals)
- Persian Gulf Pro League top scorer: 2019–20 (15 goals)
