= Mehran Mousavi =

Iranian footballer (born 1991)

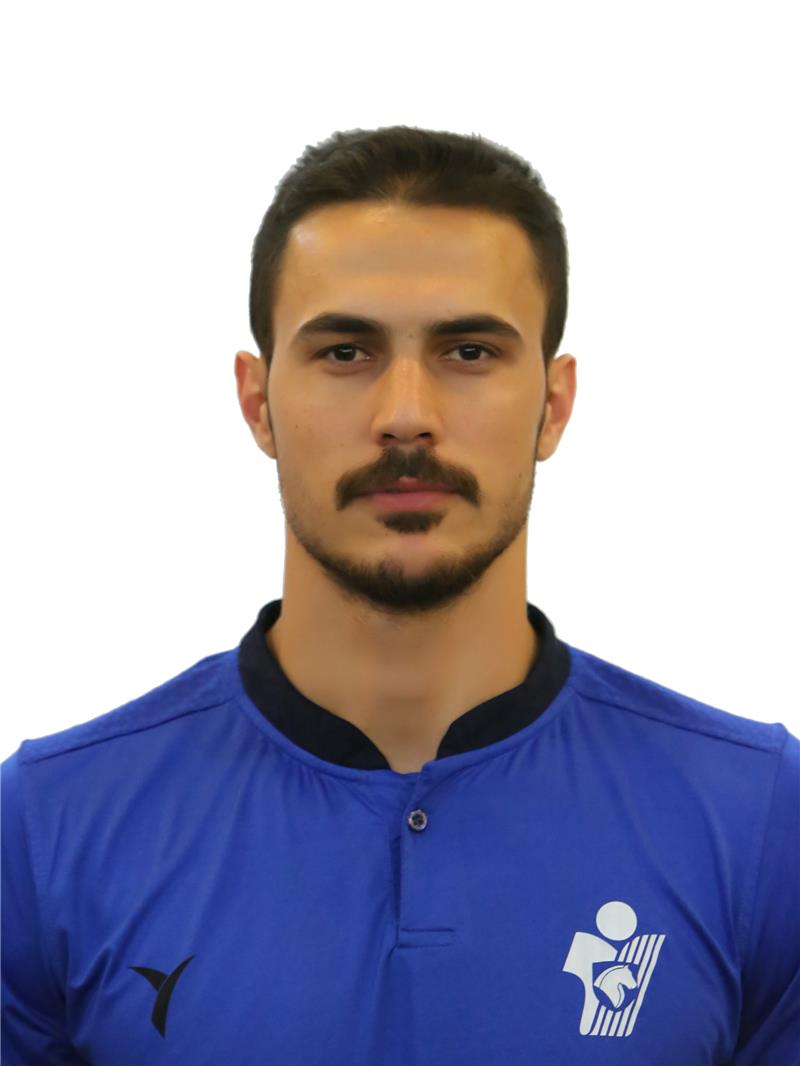

Personal information
- Full name: Seyed Mehran Mousavi
- Date of birth: 20 April 1991 (age 35)
- Place of birth: Karaj, Iran
- Height: 1.90 m (6 ft 3 in)
- Position: Center back

Team information
- Current team: Aluminium Arak
- Number: 15

Youth career
- Paykan

Senior career*
Years	Team	Apps	(Gls)
2011–2015	Shahrdari Tabriz	16	(2)
2015	Shahrdari Ardabil	18	(2)
2015–2016	Rah Ahan	16	(1)
2017–2020	Paykan	52	(3)
2020–2022	Foolad	25	(0)
2022–2025	Aluminium Arak	79	(4)
2025–2026	Fajr Sepasi	21	(1)
2026–	Aluminium Arak	12	(0)
- * Club domestic league appearances and goals as of 1 November 2024

Seyed Mehran Mousavi (Persian: سید مهران موسوی, born 20 April 1991) is an Iranian professional footballer who plays as a centre-back for Persian Gulf Pro League club Aluminium Arak.

== Honours ==
Foolad

- Hazfi Cup: 2020–21
- Iranian Super Cup: 2021
