= Mohammad Daneshgar =

Iranian footballer (born 1994)

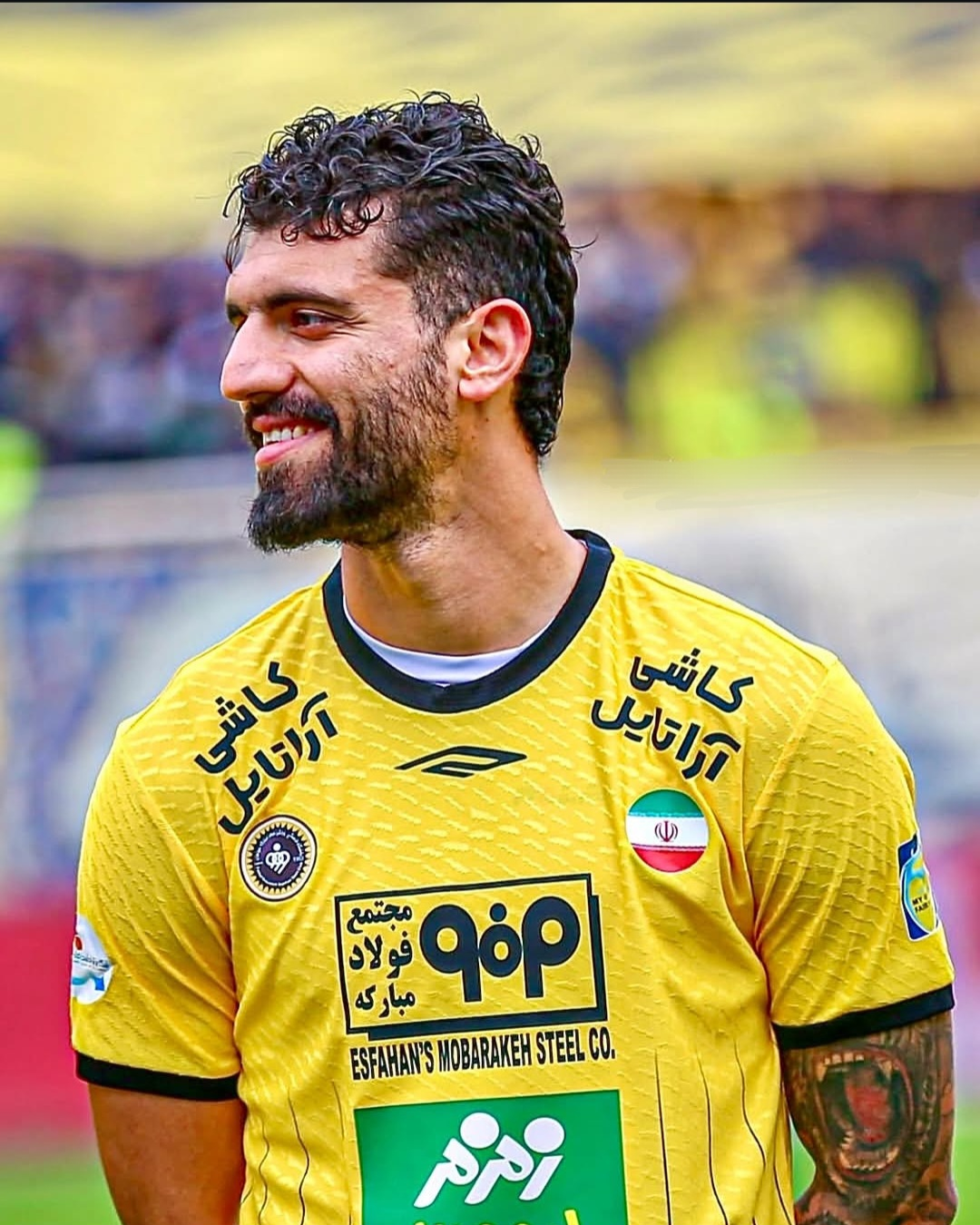
- Daneshgar at Sepahan in 2024

Personal information
- Full name: Mohammad Daneshgar
- Date of birth: 20 January 1994 (age 32)
- Place of birth: Borazjan, Iran
- Height: 1.86 m (6 ft 1 in)
- Positions: Centre-back; defensive midfielder; right back

Team information
- Current team: Tractor
- Number: 58

Youth career
- 2002–2003: Bahman Borazjan
- 2003–2004: Iranjavan
- 2004: Afshin Peyrovani Academy
- 2004–2011: Vali Asr Shiraz Academy
- 2009: → Iranjavan (loan)
- 2010–2011: → Fajr Sepasi (loan)
- 2011–2015: Fajr Sepasi

Senior career*
Years	Team	Apps	(Gls)
2012–2015	Fajr Sepasi	18	(1)
2015–2017	Naft Tehran	39	(2)
2017–2018	Saipa	29	(1)
2018–2022	Esteghlal	93	(9)
2022–2026	Sepahan	95	(4)
2026–	Tractor	8	(0)

International career^{‡}
2008–2011	Iran U17		
2011–2012	Iran U20	12	(1)
2014–2016	Iran U23	11	(2)
2023–	Iran	2	(0)
- * Club domestic league appearances and goals as of 1 January 2024 ‡ National team caps and goals as of 12 September 2023

Mohammad Daneshgar (Persian: محمد دانشگر سنجوانمره; born 20 January 1994) is an Iranian footballer who plays as a defender.

== Club career ==
=== Fajr Sepasi ===
After shining in the 2012 AFC U-19 Championship he was promoted to the first team by Mahmoud Yavari. He made his debut for Fajr Sepasi in a match against Sepahan in the 2013–14 Iran Pro League as a starter.

=== Naft Tehran ===
Daneshgar joined Naft Tehran with a three-year contract on 27 June 2015.

=== Esteghlal ===
On 2 June 2018, Daneshgar signed for Esteghlal.

== Club career statistics ==
As of 1 January 2024

Club	Division	Season	League		Hazfi Cup		Asia		Total	
Club	Division	Season	Apps	Goals	Apps	Goals	Apps	Goals	Apps	Goals
Fajr Sepasi	Pro League	2012–13	6	0	0	0	–	–	6	0
Fajr Sepasi	Pro League	2013–14	12	0	0	0	–	–	12	0
Fajr Sepasi	Division 1	2014–15	6	1	0	0	–	–	6	1
Fajr Sepasi	Total		24	1	0	0	0	0	24	1
Naft Tehran	Pro League	2015–16	17	2	2	0	–	–	19	2
Naft Tehran	Pro League	2016–17	22	0	2	0	–	–	24	0
Naft Tehran	Total		39	2	4	0	-	-	43	2
Saipa	Pro League	2017–18	26	1	1	0	–	–	27	1
Esteghlal	Pro League	2018–19	22	2	1	0	5	1	28	3
Esteghlal	Pro League	2019–20	23	4	5	1	7	0	35	5
Esteghlal	Pro League	2020–21	24	1	3	1	0	0	27	2
Esteghlal	Pro League	2021–2022	23	2	2	0	0	0	25	2
Esteghlal	Total		92	9	11	2	12	1	115	12
Sepahan	Pro League	2022–23	25	1	2	0	0	0	27	1
Sepahan	Pro League	2023–24	12	1	0	0	5	1	17	2
Sepahan	Total		37	2	2	0	5	1	44	3
Career totals			218	15	18	2	17	2	253	19

== International career ==
=== U20 ===
He was part of Iran U-20 during 2012 AFC U-19 Championship qualification, 2012 CIS Cup, 2012 AFF U-19 Youth Championship and 2012 AFC U-19 Championship.

=== U23 ===
He was invited to the Iran U-23 training camp by Nelo Vingada to prepare for Incheon 2014 and 2016 AFC U-22 Championship (Summer Olympic qualification). He was named in Iran's final squad for Incheon 2014.

=== Senior ===
He made his debut for Team Melli against Bulgaria on 7 September 2023.

== Honours ==
Naft Tehran

- Hazfi Cup: 2016–17

Esteghlal

- Persian Gulf Pro League: 2021–22
- Hazfi Cup runner-up: 2019–20, 2020–21

Sepahan

- Hazfi Cup: 2023–24
- Iranian Super Cup: 2024
