= Amin Pourali =

Association football player

Personal information
- Full name: Amin Pourali Roudbaneh
- Date of birth: 12 April 1988 (age 38)
- Place of birth: Gilan, Iran
- Height: 1.88 m (6 ft 2 in)
- Position: Defensive midfielder

Youth career
- –2009: Malavan

Senior career*
Years	Team	Apps	(Gls)
2009–2010	Malavan		
2012–2015	Rahian Kermanshah		
2015–2016	Pas Hamedan	34	(5)
2016–2017	Aluminium Arak	30	(2)
2017–2023	Gol Gohar	145	(12)
2023–2024	Malavan	10	(0)
2024	Havadar	14	(1)
- * Club domestic league appearances and goals as of 1 June 2024

Amin Pourali Roudbaneh (Persian: امین پورعلی رودبنه; born 12 April 1988) is an Iranian professional footballer who plays as a defensive midfielder.
