= Babak Moradi =

Iranian footballer

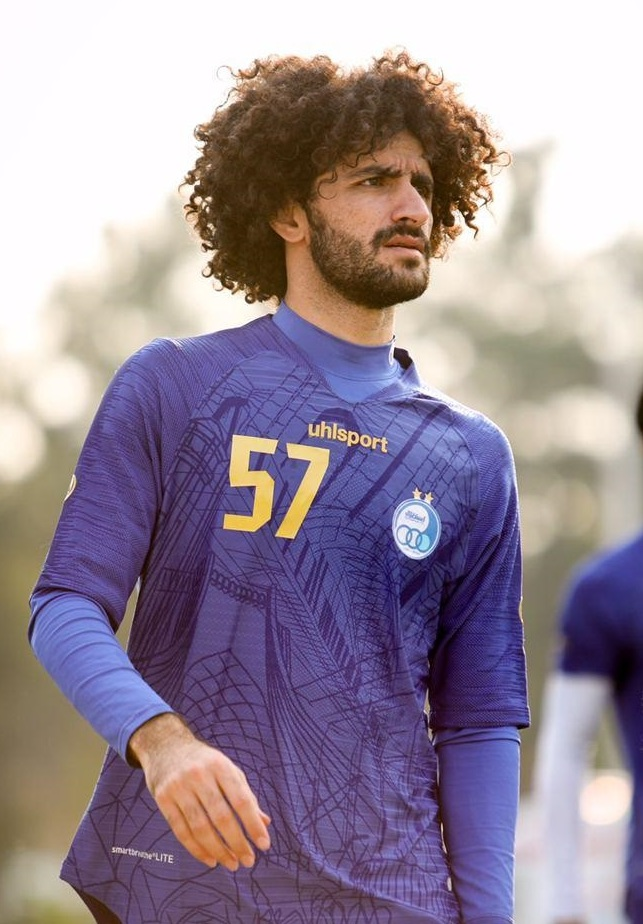

Personal information
- Date of birth: 29 July 1993 (age 33)
- Place of birth: Yasuj, Iran
- Height: 1.77 m (5 ft 10 in)
- Position: Winger

Team information
- Current team: Navad Urmia
- Number: 15

Youth career
- –2011: Fajr Sepasi

Senior career*
Years	Team	Apps	(Gls)
2013–2015	Parseh Tehran	28	(3)
2015–2016	Foolad Yazd	20	(2)
2016–2017	Rah Ahan	25	(3)
2017–2018	Malavan	27	(11)
2018–2019	Foolad	9	(0)
2019–2020	Machine Sazi	25	(9)
2020–2022	Esteghlal	15	(0)
2022–2024	Havadar	66	(7)
2024–2025	Sanat Naft	11	(1)
2025	Naft MIS	8	(0)
2026–	Navad Urmia	2	(0)
- * Club domestic league appearances and goals as of 17 February 2026

Babak Moradi (Persian: بابک مرادی ; born 29 July 1993) is an Iranian professional footballer who plays as a winger for Naft M.I.S in the Azadegan League.

== Career statistics ==
Appearances and goals by club, season and competition
Club	Season	League			Hazfi Cup		ACL		Other		Total	
Club	Season	Division	Apps	Goals	Apps	Goals	Apps	Goals	Apps	Goals	Apps	Goals
Foolad Yazd F.C.	2013–14	Azadegan League	3	1	0	0	0	0	0	0	3	1
Shahrdari Tabriz F.C.	2014–15	Azadegan League	5	0	0	0	0	0	0	0	5	0
Aluminium	2015–16	Azadegan League	8	1	0	0	0	0	0	0	8	1
Siah Jamegan	2015–16	Azadegan League	1	0	1	0	0	0	0	0	2	0
Rah Ahan	2016–17	Azadegan League	23	3	0	0	0	0	0	0	23	3
Malavan	2017–18	Azadegan League	28	11	2	1	0	0	0	0	30	12
Malavan	2018–19	Azadegan League	8	0	1	0	0	0	0	0	9	0
Malavan	Total		36	11	3	1	0	0	0	0	39	12
Foolad	2018–19	Persian Gulf Pro League	9	0	0	0	0	0	0	0	9	0
Machine Sazi	2019–20	Persian Gulf Pro League	25	3	1	0	0	0	0	0	26	3
Esteghlal	2020–21	Persian Gulf Pro League	11	0	4	0	3	0	0	0	18	0
Esteghlal	2021–22	Persian Gulf Pro League	1	0	1	0	0	0	0	0	2	0
Esteghlal	Total		12	0	5	0	3	0	0	0	20	0
Havadar	2021–22	Persian Gulf Pro League	9	0	0	0	0	0	0	0	9	0
Havadar	2022–23	Persian Gulf Pro League	29	1	3	1	0	0	0	0	32	2
Havadar	2023–24	Persian Gulf Pro League	8	2	0	0	0	0	0	0	8	2
Havadar	Total		46	3	3	1	0	0	0	0	49	4
Career total			168	22	13	2	3	0	0	0	184	24
