= Arash Rezavand =

Iranian footballer

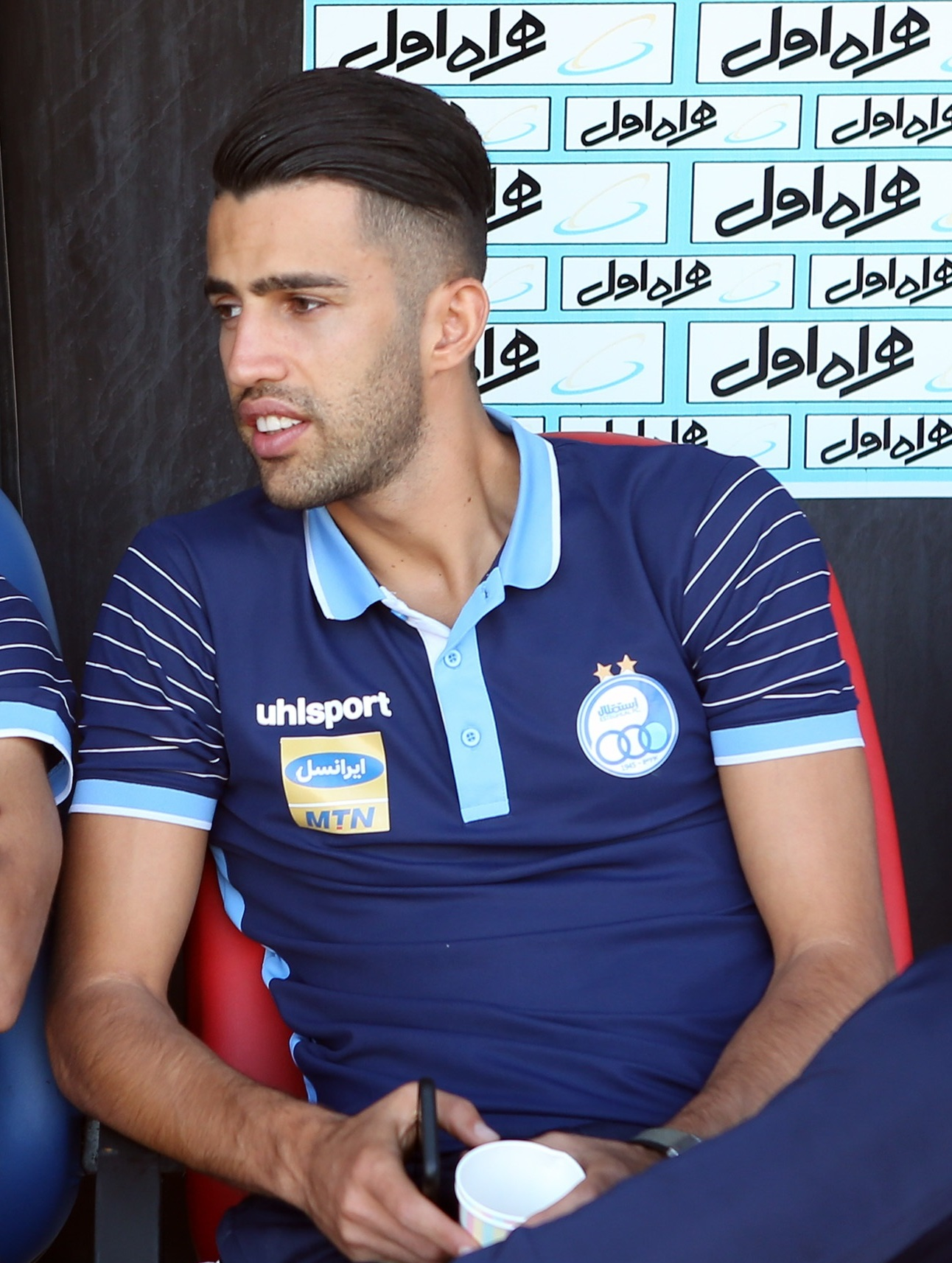
- Rezavand in 2019

Personal information
- Full name: Arash Rezavand
- Date of birth: October 5, 1993 (age 33)
- Place of birth: Tehran, Iran
- Height: 1.85 m (6 ft 1 in)
- Position: Midfielder

Team information
- Current team: Sepahan
- Number: 88

Youth career
- 2007–2009: Ettehad Pakdasht
- 2009–2011: Damash Tehran
- 2011–2014: Esteghlal
- 2013–2014: → Naft Tehran (loan)

Senior career*
Years	Team	Apps	(Gls)
2014–2017	Naft Tehran	59	(2)
2017–2019	Saipa	57	(1)
2019–2025	Esteghlal	143	(5)
2022	→ Foolad (loan)	14	(4)
2025–	Sepahan	30	(5)

International career
2014–2016	Iran U23	2	(1)
- * Club domestic league appearances and goals as of 8 May 2025

Arash Rezavand (Persian: آرش رضاوند; born October 5, 1993) is an Iranian football midfielder who plays for Sepahan in the Persian Gulf Pro League.

== International career ==
He was first called up to the national team in 2019 by Mark Wilmots and made his national debut.

== Career ==
Arash Rezavand started his professional career with Naft Tehran on loan from Esteghlal in 2013–14 Iran Pro League. Later he joined Naft Tehran permanently with a 3 years contract until end of 2016−17 Iran Pro League. He later joined Saipa football team and after brilliant games for this team, he joined Esteghlal Tehran

== Club career statistics ==
As of 29 May 2025

Club	Division	Season	League		Hazfi Cup		Asia		Other		Total	
Club	Division	Season	Apps	Goals	Apps	Goals	Apps	Goals	Apps	Goals	Apps	Goals
Naft Tehran	Pro League	2013–14	7	0	0	0	–	–	0	0	7	0
Naft Tehran	Pro League	2014–15	10	0	3	0	1	0	0	0	14	0
Naft Tehran	Pro League	2015–16	22	0	2	0	4	0	0	0	28	0
Naft Tehran	Pro League	2016–17	26	1	5	0	–	–	0	0	31	1
Naft Tehran	Total		65	1	10	0	5	0	0	0	80	1
Saipa	Persian Gulf Pro League	2017–18	29	0	1	0	–	–	0	0	30	0
Saipa	Persian Gulf Pro League	2018–19	28	1	4	0	2	0	0	0	34	3
Saipa	Total		57	1	5	0	2	2	0	0	64	3
Esteghlal	Persian Gulf Pro League	2019–20	27	1	5	0	6	0	0	0	38	1
Esteghlal	Persian Gulf Pro League	2020–21	27	0	5	0	7	0	0	0	39	0
Esteghlal	Persian Gulf Pro League	2021–22	11	0	1	0	0	0	0	0	12	0
Esteghlal	Total		65	1	11	0	13	0	0	0	89	1
Foolad	Persian Gulf Pro League	2021–22	14	4	0	0	5	0	1	0	20	4
Esteghlal	Persian Gulf Pro League	2022–23	26	3	4	1	0	0	1	0	31	4
Esteghlal	Persian Gulf Pro League	2023–24	29	1	1	0	0	0	0	0	30	1
Esteghlal	Persian Gulf Pro League	2024–25	23	0	4	0	8	1	0	0	35	1
Esteghlal	total		78	4	9	1	8	1	1	0	96	6
Career Total			279	11	35	1	33	3	2	0	349	15

== International career ==
=== Under-23 career ===
He invited to Iran U-23 training camp by Nelo Vingada to preparation for Incheon 2014 and 2016 AFC U-22 Championship (Summer Olympic qualification). He made his debut in a friendly match against Jordan and scored the first goal in 2–2 draw. He named in Iran U23 final list for Incheon 2014.

=== International goals ===
==== U23 ====
Scores and results list Iran's goal tally first.

#	Date	Venue	Opponent	Score	Result	Competition
1	22 July 2014	King Abdullah Stadium, Amman, Jordan	Jordan	1–0	2–2	Friendly

== Honours ==
Foolad

- Iranian Super Cup: 2021

Esteghlal

- Iranian Hazfi Cup: 2024–25
- Iranian Super Cup: 2022
