= Mehdi Ghayedi =

Iranian footballer (born 1998)

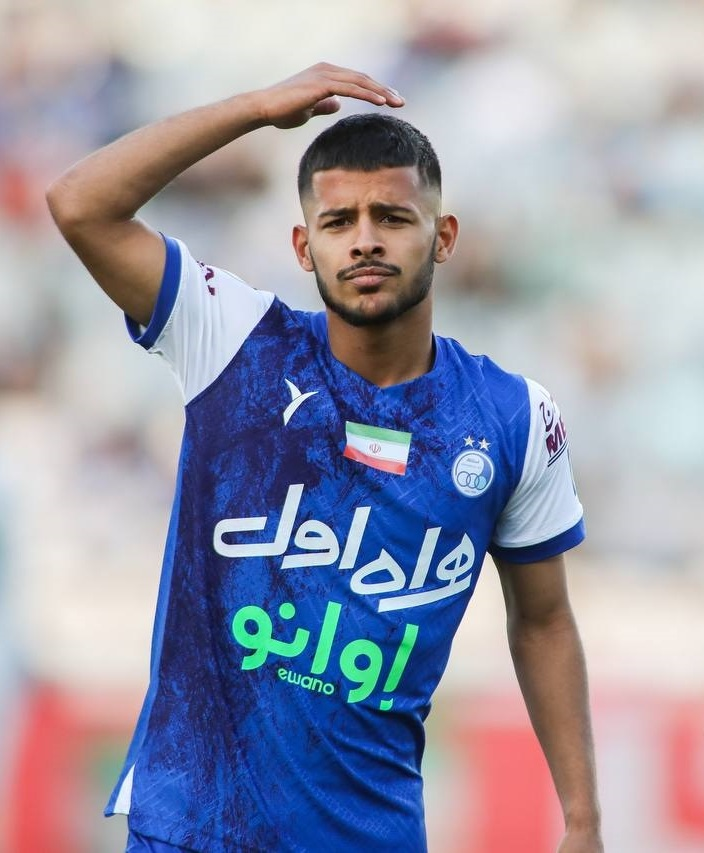
- Ghayedi with Esteghlal in 2023

Personal information
- Full name: Mehdi Ghayedi
- Date of birth: 5 December 1998 (age 27)
- Place of birth: Bushehr, Iran
- Height: 1.66 m (5 ft 5 in)
- Positions: Winger; second striker

Team information
- Current team: Al-Nasr
- Number: 10

Youth career
- 2011–2012: Iranjavan
- 2012–2013: Esteghlal Bushehr
- 2013–2016: Shahin Bushehr
- 2016: Iranjavan

Senior career*
Years	Team	Apps	(Gls)
2016–2017	Iranjavan	29	(10)
2017–2021	Esteghlal	81	(19)
2021–2025	Shabab Al Ahli	22	(4)
2022–2023	→ Esteghlal (loan)	29	(12)
2023–2025	→ Kalba (loan)	48	(28)
2025–	Al-Nasr	20	(4)

International career^{‡}
2017	Iran U20	2	(1)
2018–2020	Iran U23	8	(2)
2020–	Iran	31	(10)
- * Club domestic league appearances and goals as of 15 May 2026 ‡ National team caps and goals as of 16 June 2026

Mehdi Ghayedi (Persian: مهدی قایدی; born 5 December 1998) is an Iranian professional footballer who plays as a winger or second striker for UAE Pro League club Al-Nasr and the Iran national team.

== Club career ==
=== Iranjavan Bushehr ===
Ghayedi was born in Bushehr and began his career at the youth level with local side Iranjavan Bushehr. After his promotion to the senior squad, he was named the 2016–17 Azadegan League Young Player of the Season for scoring 10 league goals.

=== Esteghlal ===
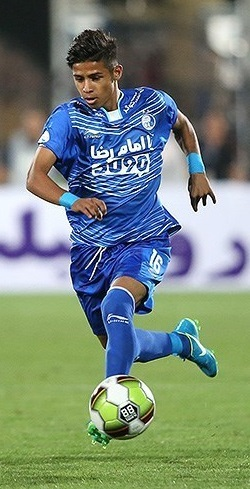
Ghayedi playing for Esteghlal in 2017

On 8 June 2017, Ghayedi signed a three-year contract with Esteghlal. Upon signing, he was given the number 16.

At the start of the 2017–18 season, the FFIRI barred Ghayedi from playing for Esteghlal, along with club teammates Majid Hosseini and Omid Noorafkan, as the three were expected to join the Iran under-23 training camp. However, the order was cancelled on 29 July 2017, with Ghayedi missing only the first week of the new season. He made his debut for Esteghlal as a substitute on 4 August 2017 in a 0–0 draw against Esteghlal Khuzestan, becoming the youngest league player to ever play for the club. Despite limited minutes, Ghayedi was praised on his debut for his skills and effort.

Ghayedi made his first start for the club in a 3–0 victory over Sepahan on 6 December 2017. On 25 January 2018, he was named man of the match for his performance in a 4–0 victory against Pars Jonoubi Jam, during which he provided an assist and won a penalty kick.

On 29 January 2018, Ghayedi was involved in a serious car crash in his hometown of Bushehr, along with friends and a cousin, who died a few days later. As a result of the accident, Ghayedi required surgery on his spleen and was ruled out for the rest of the season. A day later, Esteghlal beat Sanat Naft in Hazfi Cup, and Ghayedi's teammates dedicated the victory to him.

=== Shabab Al Ahli ===
During the summer of 2021, Ghayedi was heavily linked with a move to Qatari side Al-Gharafa. However, on 23 August 2021, he signed for Emerati side Shabab Al Ahli on a five-year contract.

== International career ==
=== Youth ===
Ghayedi was selected by manager Amir Hossein Peiravani to join the Iran under-20 team for the 2017 FIFA U-20 World Cup. After sitting on the bench for Iran's opening match against Costa Rica, Ghayedi made his tournament debut against Zambia, playing for 18 minutes in Iran's 4–2 defeat. He also played for a few minutes against Portugal as Iran lost the match and was knocked out of the competition.

=== Senior ===
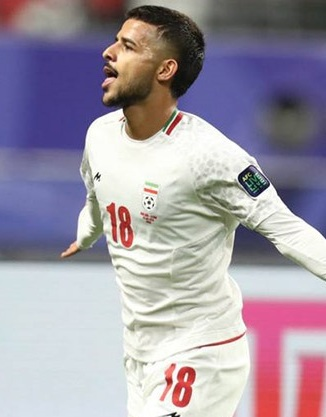
Ghayedi with Iran at the 2023 AFC Asian Cup

On 8 October 2020, Ghayedi made his senior international debut in a friendly against Uzbekistan.

On 1 June 2026, he was named in the 26-man squad for the 2026 FIFA World Cup.

== Style of play ==
Ghayedi often uses nutmeg skill for dribbling in one-on-one situations. He is also known for his use of long range shots.

== Personal life ==
=== Political views ===
On 24 January 2026, Ghayedi shared on Instagram a poem by the 11th-century Persian poet Ferdowsi, "Surely, come to mourn with us... from the sight of the blood that has fallen to the earth." He did so in reaction to a video from the 2025–2026 Iranian protests showing a father in Kahrizak searching for the body of his son, who was killed by regime forces. On 31 January, rumors began circulating that Ghayedi would withdraw from the national team in response to the government's suppression of the protests; however, the FFIRI dismissed the claims as false.

== Career statistics ==
=== Club ===
As of match played 15 May 2026

Appearances and goals by club, season and competition
Club	Season	League			National cup (Note: Includes Hazfi Cup, UAE League Cup and UAE President's Cup)		Continental		Other		Total	
Club	Season	Division	Apps	Goals	Apps	Goals	Apps	Goals	Apps	Goals	Apps	goals
Iranjavan	2016–17	Azadegan League	29	10	1	0	–		–		30	10
Esteghlal	2017–18	Persian Gulf Pro League	12	0	2	0	1 (Note: Appearance(s) in AFC Champions League)	0	–		15	0
Esteghlal	2018–19	Persian Gulf Pro League	10	3	2	0	3	0	–		15	3
Esteghlal	2019–20	Persian Gulf Pro League	30	10	5	2	6	3	–		41	15
Esteghlal	2020–21	Persian Gulf Pro League	29	6	5	0	6	3	–		40	9
Esteghlal	Total		81	19	14	2	16	6	–		111	27
Shabab Al Ahli	2021–22	UAE Pro League	22	4	3	1	1	0	0	0	26	5
Esteghlal (loan)	2022–23	Persian Gulf Pro League	29	12	5	0	–		1 (Note: Appearance in Iranian Super Cup)	0	35	12
Kalba FC (loan)	2023–24	UAE Pro League	25	12	3	3	0	0	6	1	34	16
Kalba FC (loan)	2024–25	UAE Pro League	23	16	2	2	0	0	1	0	26	19
Kalba FC (loan)	Total		48	28	5	5	0	0	7	1	60	34
Al-Nasr	2025–26	UAE Pro League	20	4	0	0	0	0	5	2	25	6
Career total			229	77	28	8	17	6	13	3	287	94

=== International ===
As of match played 16 June 2026

Appearances and goals by national team and year
National team	Year	Apps	Goals
Iran	2020	2	1
Iran	2021	6	1
Iran	2023	2	0
Iran	2024	15	7
Iran	2025	2	0
Iran	2026	4	1
Total		31	10

Scores and results list Iran's goal tally first, score column indicates score after each Ghayedi goal.

List of international goals scored by Mehdi Ghayedi
No.	Date	Venue	Opponent	Score	Result	Competition
1	12 November 2020	Koševo City Stadium, Sarajevo, Bosnia and Herzegovina	Bosnia and Herzegovina	2–0	2–0	Friendly
2	11 June 2021	Bahrain National Stadium, Riffa, Bahrain	Cambodia	9–0	10–0	2022 FIFA World Cup qualification
3	9 January 2024	Al Rayyan Training, Al Rayyan, Qatar	Indonesia	4–0	5–0	Friendly
4	9 January 2024	Al Rayyan Training, Al Rayyan, Qatar	Indonesia	5–0	5–0	Friendly
5	14 January 2024	Education City Stadium, Al Rayyan, Qatar	Palestine	3–0	4–1	2023 AFC Asian Cup
6	19 January 2024	Khalifa International Stadium, Al Rayyan, Qatar	Hong Kong	1–0	1–0	2023 AFC Asian Cup
7	26 March 2024	Ashgabat Stadium, Ashgabat, Turkmenistan	Turkmenistan	1–0	1–0	2026 FIFA World Cup qualification
8	10 September 2024	Hazza bin Zayed Stadium, Al-Ain, United Arab Emirates	United Arab Emirates	1–0	1–0	2026 FIFA World Cup qualification
9	14 November 2024	New Laos National Stadium, Vientiane, Laos	North Korea	1–0	3–2	2026 FIFA World Cup qualification
10	31 March 2026	Corendon Airlines Park, Antalya, Turkey	Costa Rica	5–0	5–0	2026 Jordan International Tournament

== Honours ==
Esteghlal

- Hazfi Cup: 2017–18
- Iranian Super Cup: 2022

Individual

- Persian Gulf Pro League most assists: 2019–20
- AFC Best Young Player of the Year: 2020
- AFC Asian Cup Team of the Tournament: 2023
