= List of Iranian football transfers summer 2023 =

This is a list of Iranian football transfers for the 2023 summer transfer window. Only moves from Persian Gulf Pro League are listed. The summer transfer window will begin on 10 June 2023 and closes at midnight on 1 September 2023. Players without a club may join at any time. This list includes transfers featuring at least one Iran Football League club which were completed after the end of the winter 2022–23 transfer window on 26 January 2023 and before the end of the 2023 summer window.

== Rules and regulations ==
According to Iran Football Federation rules for 2023–24 Persian Gulf Pro League, each Football Club is allowed to take up to maximum 7 new Iranian player from the other clubs who already played in the 2022–23 Persian Gulf Pro League season. In addition to these seven new players, each club is allowed to take up to 3 players from Free agent (who did not play in 2022–23 Persian Gulf Pro League season or doesn't list in any 2022–23 League after season's start) during the season.

=== Players limits ===
The Iranian Football Clubs who participate in 2023–24 Iranian football different levels are allowed to have up to maximum 37 players in their player lists, which will be categorized in the following groups:

- Up to maximum 19 adult (without any age limit) players
- Up to maximum 7 under-23 players (i.e. the player whose birth is after 1 January 2001).
- Up to maximum 7 under-21 players (i.e. the player whose birth is after 1 January 2003).
- Up to maximum 6 Special (without any age limit) players (including Soldier, On-loan, B-team and Academy players)

== Persian Gulf Pro League ==
=== Aluminium Arak ===
In:

No.	Pos.	Nation	Player
—	DF	IRN	Milad Badragheh (From Paykan)
—	DF	IRN	Behrouz Norouzifard (From Paykan)
—	MF	IRN	Mohammadmehdi Lotfi (From Paykan)
—	MF	IRN	Mehdi Limouchi (From Paykan)
—	GK	IRN	Ahmad Gohari (Loan From Persepolis)
—	DF	IRN	Abolfazl Soleimani (From Persepolis)
—	DF	IRN	Ehsan Ghahari (From Nassaji)
—	DF	IRN	Morteza Tabrizi (From Gol Gohar)

Out:

No.	Pos.	Nation	Player
—	GK	IRN	Hossein Pour Hamidi (Loan return to Tractor)
—	DF	IRN	Vahid Mohammadzadeh (to Nassaji)
—	FW	IRN	Mahmoud Ghaed Rahmati (to Nassaji)
—	FW	IRN	Mohammad Reza Azadi (to Nassaji)
—	DF	IRN	Amir Mohammad Houshmand (to Nassaji)
—	DF	IRN	Ehsan Hosseini (to Nassaji)
—	MF	IRN	Mostafa Ahmadi (to Shams Azar)
—	FW	IRN	Emad Mirjavan (to Mes Kerman)
—	MF	IRN	Hossein Madadi (to Pars Jonoubi Jam)
—	DF	IRN	Amirhossein Nemati (to Saipa)
—	MF	COL	Hansel Zapata (to (Kuwait) Al-Nasr)

=== Esteghlal ===
In:

No.	Pos.	Nation	Player
7	FW	IRN	Mehrdad Mohammadi (from (Qatar) Al Sailiya)
5	DF	IRN	Armin Sohrabian (from Gol Gohar)
6	DF	IRN	Iman Salimi (from Mes Rafsanjan)
20	FW	IRN	Aria Barzegar (from Naft Masjed Soleyman)
12	GK	IRN	Mohammad Reza Khaledabadi (from Havadar)
—	MF	IRQ	Muntadher Mohammed (from (Iraq) Al-Naft)
—	DF	IRN	Saman Touranian (from Mes Kerman)

Out:

No.	Pos.	Nation	Player
20	FW	IRN	Mehdi Ghayedi (Loan return to (United Arab Emirates) Shabab Al Ahli)
77	FW	IRN	Mohammad Mohebi (Loan return to (Portugal) Santa Clara)
55	DF	BRA	Raphael Silva (Unattached)
5	DF	IRN	Aref Gholami (Unattached)
11	FW	IRN	Sajjad Shahbazzadeh (to Mes Rafsanjan)
—	GK	IRN	Arsha Shakouri (to Havadar)
6	MF	IRQ	Muntadher Mohammed (On loan to Mes Rafsanjan)
90	GK	IRN	Sina Saeidifar (to Shams Azar)
20	FW	IRN	Aria Barzegar (to Nassaji Mazandaran)
79	MF	IRN	Sobhan Khaghani (to Zob Ahan)
26	DF	IRN	Omid Hamedifar
98	GK	IRN	Alireza Rezaei

=== Esteghlal Khuzestan ===
In:

No.	Pos.	Nation	Player

Out:

No.	Pos.	Nation	Player

=== Foolad ===
In:

No.	Pos.	Nation	Player

Out:

No.	Pos.	Nation	Player

=== Gol Gohar ===
In:

No.	Pos.	Nation	Player

Out:

No.	Pos.	Nation	Player
—	DF	IRN	Armin Sohrabian (to Esteghlal)

=== Havadar ===
In:

No.	Pos.	Nation	Player

Out:

No.	Pos.	Nation	Player

=== Malavan ===
In:

No.	Pos.	Nation	Player

Out:

No.	Pos.	Nation	Player

=== Mes Rafsanjan ===
In:

No.	Pos.	Nation	Player
—	FW	IRN	Sajjad Shahbazzadeh (from Esteghlal)
—	MF	IRQ	Muntadher Mohammed (On loan from Esteghlal)

Out:

No.	Pos.	Nation	Player
—	DF	IRN	Iman Salimi (to Esteghlal)

=== Nassaji ===
In:

No.	Pos.	Nation	Player
—	GK	IRN	Rashid Mazaheri (from Paykan)
—	DF	IRN	Amir Mohammad Houshmand (from Aluminium)
—	DF	IRN	Vahid Mohammadzadeh (from Aluminium)
—	DF	IRN	Ehsan Hosseini (from Aluminium)
—	MF	IRN	Mahmoud Ghaed Rahmati (from Aluminium)
—	FW	IRN	Mohammad Reza Azadi (from Aluminium)
—	FW	IRN	Mohammadreza Abbasi (from Tractor)
—	MF	IRN	Farshid Esmaeili (from Foolad)
—	FW	IRQ	Alaa Abbas (from (Iraq) Al-Zawraa)
—	MF	IRN	Esmail Babaei (from Naft MIS)
—	FW	IRN	Aria Barzegar (from Esteghlal)

Out:

No.	Pos.	Nation	Player
2	DF	IRN	Ehsan Ghahari (to Aluminium Arak)
1	GK	IRN	Alireza Haghighi (to Havadar)
10	MF	IRN	Ali Shojaei (to Tractor)
8	MF	IRN	Ayoub Kalantari (to Havadar)
70	MF	IRN	Reza Jafari (to Malavan)
99	FW	IRN	Karim Eslami (to Havadar)
18	DF	IRN	Hamed Shiri (retired)
55	DF	IRN	Alireza Ebrahimi (to Mes Kerman)
15	MF	IRN	Ahmad Abdollahzadeh (to Esteghlal Khuzestan)
5	MF	IRN	Akbar Sadeghi
26	FW	MLI	Adama Niane
6	DF	IRN	Shahin Taherkhani
19	FW	IRN	Erfan Golmohammadi
20	MF	IRN	Mohsen Karimi
88	MF	IRN	Mohammad Sharifi
9	FW	IRN	Mehdi Nazari
23	DF	IRN	Mostafa Javadian
22	GK	IRN	Mohammad Mehdi Hamidi

=== Paykan ===
In:

No.	Pos.	Nation	Player

Out:

No.	Pos.	Nation	Player

=== Persepolis ===
In:

No.	Pos.	Nation	Player

Out:

No.	Pos.	Nation	Player

=== Sanat Naft ===
In:

No.	Pos.	Nation	Player

Out:

No.	Pos.	Nation	Player

=== Sepahan ===
In:

No.	Pos.	Nation	Player
1	GK	IRN	Payam Niazmand (from (Portugal) Portimonense, previously on loan)
77	MF	IRN	Ali Ahmadi ^{U21} (from Sepahan U19)
81	MF	IRN	Reza Shekari (from Gol Gohar)
11	FW	IRN	Kaveh Rezaei (from Tractor)
5	MF	IRN	Reza Asadi (from Tractor)
90	MF	IRN	Ehsan Pahlavan (from Foolad)
7	FW	IRN	Issa Alekasir (from Persepolis)
2	DF	IRN	Hadi Mohammadi (from Tractor)
6	MF	BFA	Bryan Dabo (from (Greece) Aris)

Out:

No.	Pos.	Nation	Player
41	FW	BDI	Elvis Kamsoba (Unattached)
11	MF	BRA	Ygor Catatau (Unattached)
15	MF	POR	Manuel Fernandes (Unattached)
25	FW	IRN	Reza Bakhtiarizadeh ^{U21} (to Sepahan U21)
8	MF	IRN	Yasin Salmani ^{U23} (to Persepolis)
23	DF	IRN	Sobhan Pasandideh (Loan return from Malavan / to Havadar)
6	MF	IRN	Masoud Rigi (to Persepolis)
26	MF	IRN	Amir Mohammad Mohkamkar ^{U21} (Loan return from Saipa / to Esteghlal Khuzestan)
27	MF	IRN	Hassan Shoushtari (Loan return from Saipa / to Esteghlal Khuzestan)
20	FW	IRN	Isa Moradi (On loan to Shams Azar)
12	GK	IRN	Ali Keykhosravi (Unattached)
17	MF	IRN	Jalaleddin Alimohammadi (to Mes Rafsanjan)
81	MF	IRN	Mohammad Alinejad (On loan to Foolad)
7	MF	IRN	Mohammad Reza Hosseini (Loan return from Gol Gohar / to Unattached)
26	DF	IRN	Mohammad Hossein Rouholamin (On loan to Chadormalou Ardakan)

=== Shams Azar ===
In:

No.	Pos.	Nation	Player

Out:

No.	Pos.	Nation	Player

=== Tractor ===
In:

No.	Pos.	Nation	Player
1	GK	IRN	Hossein Pour Hamidi (Loan return from Aluminium Arak)
12	GK	IRN	Adib Zarei (from Shahin Bushehr)
3	DF	IRN	Shojae Khalilzadeh (from (Qatar) Al Ahli)
77	DF	IRN	Saeid Aghaei (from Foolad)
2	DF	IRN	Mehdi Shiri (from Foolad)
20	MF	IRN	Mehdi Hosseini (from Mes Rafsanjan)
21	DF	IRN	Aref Aghasi (from Foolad)
8	MF	ESP	Álvaro Jiménez (On loan from (Spain) Cádiz)
16	MF	IRN	Siamak Nemati (from Persepolis)
29	FW	IRN	Aref Rostami (from Mes Kerman)
22	DF	IRN	Mohammad Naderi (from (Turkey) Altay)
99	MF	IRN	Amirhossein Hosseinzadeh (from (Belgium) Charleroi)
80	MF	IRN	Mohammadreza Shakibkhou (from Aluminium Arak)
16	FW	IRN	Mehdi Abdi (On loan from Persepolis)

Out:

No.	Pos.	Nation	Player
1	GK	IRN	Mohammad Reza Akhbari (to Gol Gohar)
2	DF	IRN	Abolfazl Razzaghpour (to Gol Gohar)
33	FW	IRN	Mohammad Abbaszadeh (to Foolad)
99	FW	IRN	Kaveh Rezaei (to Sepahan)
17	DF	IRN	Pouria Aria Kia (to Zob Ahan)
9	MF	IRN	Reza Asadi (to Sepahan)
8	MF	IRN	Shahin Saghebi (to Paykan)
96	FW	IRN	Mohammadreza Abbasi (to Nassaji Mazandaran)
6	MF	IRN	Mehdi Kiani (to Kheybar Khorramabad)
30	GK	IRN	Mehdi Haghighat (to Mes Sungun)
4	DF	IRN	Hadi Mohammadi (to Sepahan)
19	FW	IRN	Hamed Pakdel (to Paykan)
19	DF	IRN	Arash Ghaderi (to Zob Ahan)
23	DF	IRN	Sajjad Danaei (to Kheybar Khorramabad)
40	GK	IRN	Reza Kakhsaz (to Naft MIS)
69	GK	IRN	Reza Seyf Ahmadi (Unattached)
77	MF	ESP	Jaime Romero (Unattached)

=== Zob Ahan ===
In:

No.	Pos.	Nation	Player

Out:

No.	Pos.	Nation	Player
