= 2021–22 Persepolis F.C. season =

Persepolis
2021–22 season
- Chairman: Majid Sadri (until January 13, 2022); Reza Darvish (from January 13, 2022)
- Manager: Yahya Golmohammadi
- Stadium: Azadi Stadium
- Persian Gulf Pro League: 2nd
- Hazfi Cup: Quarter finals
- Iranian Super Cup: Runners-up
- 2021 AFC Champions League: Quarter finals
- 2022 AFC Champions League: Disqualified
- Top goalscorer: League: Mehdi Abdi (7); All: Mehdi Abdi (9)
- Biggest win: 4–0 vs Vista Toorbin
- Biggest defeat: 0–3 vs Al-Hilal
Home colours	Away colours	Third colours

The 2021–22 season was the Persepolis's 21st season in the Pro League, and their 39th consecutive season in the top division of Iranian Football. They also competed in the Hazfi Cup, Super Cup and AFC Champions League.

== Squad ==
No.	Name	Age	Nationality	Position (s)	Since	App	Goals	Assist	Ends	Signed from	Transfer fee	Notes
Goalkeepers
34	Amir Mohammad Yousefi	21	(Iran)	GK	2020	0	0	0	2023	Academy	Free	U-21
81	Hamed Lak	31	(Iran)	GK	2020	43	0	0	2022	Machine Sazi	Free	
99	Ahmad Gohari	25	(Iran)	GK	2022	0	0	0	2023	Sanat Naft	Free	
Defenders
3	Farshad Faraji	27	(Iran)	DF	2021	11	0	0	2023	Padideh	Free	
4	Jalal Hosseini	39	(Iran)	DF	2016	166	6	4	2022	Naft Tehran	Free	Captain
5	Alireza Ebrahimi	32	(Iran)	DF	2021	0	0	0	2023	Gol Gohar	Free	
6	Ali Nemati	25	(Iran)	DF	2021	0	0	0	2024	Padideh	Free	
27	Ramin Rezaeian	31	(Iran)	DF	2022	40	9	7	2022	(Qatar) Al-Duhail	€190,000	
32	Ali Joudaki	21	(Iran)	DF	2021	0	0	0	2023	Academy	Free	
55	Manuchehr Safarov	20	(Tajikistan)	DF	2021	0	0	0	2024	(Tajikistan) Istiklol	€175,000	
66	Vahdat Hanonov	21	(Tajikistan)	DF	2021	0	0	0	2024	(Tajikistan) Istiklol	€150,000	
77	Saeid Aghaei	26	(Iran)	DF	2020	33	0	4	2022	Sepahan	Free	
88	Siamak Nemati	27	(Iran)	DF	2017	133	12	6	2023	Paykan	Free	
	Amir Mohammad Kharkesh	18	(Iran)	DF	2020	0	0	0	2023	Academy	Free	U-21
Midfielders
2	Omid Alishah	29	(Iran)	MF	2013	185	19	26	2023	Rah Ahan	Free	Vice Captain
8	Reza Asadi	25	(Iran)	MF	2021	1	0	1	2022	(Austria) St. Pölten	Free	
9	Mehdi Torabi	27	(Iran)	MF	2018	77	22	13	2023	(Qatar) Al Arabi	Free	
10	Milad Sarlak	26	(Iran)	MF	2020	43	2	1	2022	Padideh	Free	
11	Kamal Kamyabinia	32	(Iran)	MF	2015	186	20	4	2024	Naft Tehran	Free	
14	Ehsan Pahlavan	28	(Iran)	MF	2020	42	1	2	2022	Zob Ahan	Free	
18	Mohammad Sharifi	21	(Iran)	MF	2020	8	0	0	2022	Saipa	Free	U-21
19	Vahid Amiri	33	(Iran)	MF	2016	151	20	22	2024	(Turkey) Trabzonspor	Free	
23	Ali Shojaei	24	(Iran)	MF	2020	19	0	1	2022	Nassaji	Free	
80	Mohammad Omri	19	(Iran)	MF	2020	1	0	0	2023	Academy	Free	U-21
Forwards
16	Mehdi Abdi	23	(Iran)	FW	2017	56	18	0	2025	Academy	Free	U-23
30	Mehdi Mehdikhani	24	(Iran)	FW	2020	18	0	0	2022	(Croatia) Varaždin	Free	
40	Hamed Pakdel	30	(Iran)	FW	2021	1	0	0	2023	Aluminium Arak	Free	
70	Sherzod Temirov	23	(Uzbekistan)	FW	2022	0	0	0	2023	(Uzbekistan) Pakhtakor	Free	U-23
72	Issa Alekasir	31	(Iran)	FW	2020	26	10	0	2022	Sanat Naft Abadan	Free	
Players away on loan
25	Alireza Khodaei	19	(Iran)	FW	2020	1	0	0	2023	Academy	Free	U-21
Players left the club during the season
20	Reza Dehghani	23	(Iran)	MF	2021	0	0	0	2023	Transfer to Tractor		
44	Božidar Radošević	32	(Croatia)	GK	2016	41	0	0	2023	Release		
17	Mehdi Shiri	30	(Iran)	DF	2018	85	1	3	2023	Transfer to Foolad		

== New Contracts ==
No	P	Name	Age	Contract length	Contract ends	Source
19	MF	Vahid Amiri	33	3 season	2024	
17	DF	Mehdi Shiri	30	2 season	2023	
2	MF	Omid Alishah	29	2 season	2023	
11	MF	Kamal Kamyabinia	32	3 season	2024	

== Transfers ==
=== In ===
No	P	Name	Age	Moving from	Ends	Transfer fee	Type	Transfer window	Quota	Source
20	FW	Amir Roustaei	24	Paykan			Loan Return	Summer		
26	AM	Saeid Hosseinpour	22	Machine Sazi			Loan Return	Summer		
25	AM	Aria Barzegar	19	Fajr Sepasi			Loan Return	Summer		
5	CB	Alireza Ebrahimi	31	Gol Gohar	2023		Transfer	Summer	PL	
20	LW	Reza Dehghani	23	Sepahan	2023		Transfer	Summer	PL	
6	DF	Ali Nemati	25	Padideh	2024		Transfer	Summer	PL	
8	MF	Reza Asadi	25	(Austria) St. Pölten	2022		Transfer	Summer		
40	MF	Hamed Pakdel	29	Aluminium Arak	2023		Transfer	Summer	PL	
32	LB	Ali Joudaki	21	Academy			Promoted	Summer		
66	DF	(Tajikistan) Vahdat Hanonov	21	(Tajikistan) Istiklol	2024	€150,000	Transfer	Summer		
55	DF	(Tajikistan) Manuchehr Safarov	20	(Tajikistan) Istiklol	2024	€175,000	Transfer	Summer		
99	GK	Ahmad Gohari	26	Sanat Naft	2023		Transfer	Winter		
27	DF	Ramin Rezaeian	31	(Qatar) Al-Duhail	2022	€190,000	Transfer	Winter		
70	FW	(Uzbekistan) Sherzod Temirov	23	(Uzbekistan) Pakhtakor	2023	€277,000	Transfer	Winter		

=== Out ===
No	P	Name	Age	Moving to	Transfer fee	Type	Transfer window	Source
6	CB	Hossein Kanaanizadegan	27	(Qatar) Al Ahli		Transfer	Summer	
70	FW	Shahriyar Moghanlou	26	(Portugal) Santa Clara		Loan Return	Summer	
8	CM	Ahmad Nourollahi	28	(United Arab Emirates) Shabab Al Ahli		Transfer	Summer	
26	CM	Saeid Hosseinpour	22	(Greece) Kavala		Release	Summer	
20	FW	Amir Roostaei	23	Naft Masjed Soleyman		Transfer	Summer	
	FW	Aria Barzegar	18	Fajr Sepasi		Loan	Summer	
25	FW	Alireza Khodaei	19	Saipa		Loan	Summer	
20	MF	Reza Dehghani	23	Tractor		Transfer	Summer	
44	GK	Božidar Radošević	32			Release	Winter	
17	DF	Mehdi Shiri	31	Foolad		Transfer	Winter	

== Technical staff ==
Persepolis Head coach in 2021–22 Persian Gulf Pro League
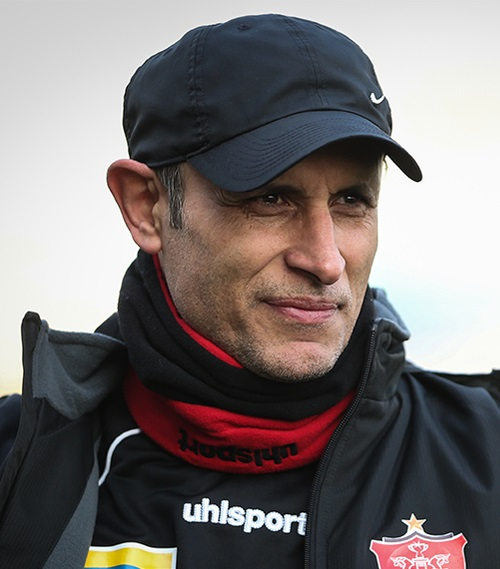

Position	Staff
Head coach	(Iran) Yahya Golmohammadi
Assistant coach	(Iran) Hamid Motahari
First-team coach	(Iran) Karim Bagheri
Goalkeeping coach	(Iran) Davoud Fanaei
Physical fitness trainer	(Iran) Dr. Mazaher Rahimpour
Analyzer	(Iran) Mohammad Asgari
Doctor	(Iran) Dr. Alireza Haghighat
Physiotherapist	(Iran) Ali Aazam
Team Manager	(Iran) Afshin Peyrovani
Media Officer	(Iran) Alireza Ashraf

== Pre-season and friendlies ==
Win Draw Loss Fixtures

8 September 2021 Friendly	Persepolis	1–2	Gol Gohar	Tehran
18:35 DST +04:30	Shakeri; Hosseini	Report	Abdi 61'	Stadium: Shahid Kazemi Stadium

25 September 2021 Friendly	Persepolis	1–1	Paykan	Tehran
	Pakdel 46'		salehi 80'	Stadium: Shahid Kazemi Stadium

1 October 2021 Friendly	Persepolis	3–0	Shahrdari Astara	Tehran
16:30 DST +04:30	Asadi, Alishah			Stadium: Shahid Kazemi Stadium

8 October 2021 Friendly	Persepolis	3–1	Sepahan	Tehran
16:30 DST +04:30	Alekasir; J. Hosseini 48'; Pakdel		M.R. Hosseini	Stadium: Azadi Stadium

== Competitions ==
=== Overview ===
Competition	First match	Last match	Starting round	Final position	Record							
Competition	First match	Last match	Starting round	Final position	Pld	W	D	L	GF	GA	GD	Win %
PGPL	22 October 2021	2 June 2022	Matchday 1	Runner-up	30	18	9	3	44	21	+23	60.00
Hazfi Cup	20 December 2021	10 April 2022	Round of 32	Quarter-finals	3	2	0	1	9	3	+6	66.67
Super Cup	7 February 2022		Final	Runners-up	1	0	0	1	0	1	−1	0.00
2021 ACL	14 September 2021	16 October 2021	Round of 16	Quarter-finals	2	1	0	1	1	3	−2	50.00
2022 ACL	-	-	Disqualified	Disqualified	0	0	0	0	0	0	+0	—
Total					36	21	9	6	54	28	+26	58.33

Last updated: 2 June 2022
Source: Competitions

=== Persian Gulf Pro League ===
==== Results summary ====
Overall								Home						Away					
Pld	W	D	L	GF	GA	GD	Pts	W	D	L	GF	GA	GD	W	D	L	GF	GA	GD
30	18	9	3	44	21	+23	63	11	3	1	24	10	+14	7	6	2	20	11	+9

Last updated: 2 June 2022.
Source: Ipl Stats

==== Results by round ====
Round	1	2	3	4	5	6	7	8	9	10	11	12	13	14	15	16	17	18	19	20	21	22	23	24	25	26	27	28	29	30
Ground	A	H	A	H	A	H	H	A	H	A	H	A	H	A	H	H	A	H	A	H	A	A	H	A	H	A	H	A	H	A
Result	W	W	L	D	D	W	W	D	D	W	W	W	W	D	W	W	W	W	D	W	L	W	D	D	W	D	L	W	W	W
Position	2	3	6	6	7	4	4	5	5	4	3	2	2	2	2	2	2	2	2	2	2	2	2	2	2	2	3	3	2	2

Updated to match(es) played on 2 June 2022. Source: "iranleague". Archived from the original on 2018-01-26.
A = Away; H = Home; W = Win; D = Draw; L = Loss; U = Unfinished

==== League table ====
Pos	Team	Pld	W	D	L	GF	GA	GD	Pts
1	Esteghlal (Note: Esteghlal could not pay its debts on time and did not obtain an AFC license. Therefore, even if they earn the right to play in Asian competitions based on league position, they will not be able to participate. According to FFIRI special rules for ACL slots, the next best-ranked team of 2022–23 Persian Gulf Pro League will replace Esteghlal in ACL.) (C)	30	19	11	0	39	10	+29	68
2	Persepolis (Note: Persepolis qualified to AFC Champions League group stage directly by winning the 2022–23 Persian Gulf Pro League.)	30	18	9	3	44	21	+23	63
3	Sepahan (Note: Sepahan qualified to AFC Champions League group stage directly by being the runner-up in 2022–23 Persian Gulf Pro League.)	30	16	8	6	43	21	+22	56
4	Gol Gohar	30	13	12	5	37	28	+9	51
5	Foolad	30	13	10	7	30	22	+8	49

Updated to match(es) played on 2 June 2022. Source: Soccerway, IPL Table
Rules for classification: 1) Points; 2) Head-to-head points; 3) Head-to-head goal difference; 4) Head-to-head goals scored; 5) Goal difference; 6) Goals scored; 7) Play-off at neutral venue.
(Note: Head-to-head record is used only after all the matches between the teams in question have been played).
(C) Champions

==== Matches ====
Win Draw Loss Unfinished

22 October 2021 1	Foolad	1–3	Persepolis	Ahvaz
18:00 IRST +03:30	Hardani (yellow card) 71'; Pereira 77' (pen.)	Report	Asadi 61'; Pakdel 72'; Alekasir 84'	Stadium: Foolad Arena; Referee: Mohammad Hossein Torabian; Man of the Match: Reza Asadi (Persepolis)
Note: Due to the COVID-19 pandemic in Iran, the match was played behind closed doors.

27 October 2021 2	Persepolis	2–1	Nassaji	Tehran
18:00 IRST +03:30	Abdi 42', 63'; Alekasir (yellow card) 79'; Torabi (yellow card) 85'	Report	Kalantari (yellow card) 17'; Shojaei (yellow card) 68'	Stadium: Azadi Stadium; Referee: Amir Arab Baraghi; Man of the Match: Mehdi Abdi (Persepolis)
Note: Due to the COVID-19 pandemic in Iran, the match was played behind closed doors.

1 November 2021 3	Aluminium Arak	1–0	Persepolis	Arak
16:00 IRST +03:30	Ahmadi (yellow card) 20'; Naghizadeh 65'; Pour Hamidi (yellow card) 90+4'	Report	Hosseini (yellow card) 16'; S. Nemati (yellow card) 62'	Stadium: Imam Khomeini Stadium; Referee: Abdolnabi Pourkhalaf; Man of the Match: Alireza Naghizadeh (Aluminium Arak)
Note: Due to the COVID-19 pandemic in Iran, the match was played behind closed doors.

6 November 2021 4	Persepolis	1–1	Gol Gohar	Tehran
18:00 IRST +03:30	Alekasir 53'; Faraji (yellow card) 87'	Report	Sohrabian (yellow card) 28', (goal) 45+2'; Pourali (yellow card) 55'; Shekari (yellow card) 58'	Stadium: Azadi Stadium; Referee: Bijan Heydari; Man of the Match: Armin Sohrabian (Gol Gohar)
Note: Due to the COVID-19 pandemic in Iran, the match was played behind closed doors.

19 November 2021 5	Mes Rafsanjan	1–1	Persepolis	Sarcheshmeh
16:00 IRST +03:30	Kaabi 67'	Report	Torabi 71' (pen.); Sarlak (yellow card) 83'	Stadium: Shahid Zeinali Stadium; Referee: Hassan Akrami; Man of the Match: Jalal Hosseini (Persepolis)
Note: Due to the COVID-19 pandemic in Iran, the match was played behind closed doors.

24 November 2021 6	Persepolis	1–0	Sanat Naft	Tehran
18:00 IRST +03:30	Torabi (yellow card) 30'; Sarlak 72'		Gohari (yellow card) 38'; Reykani (yellow card) 85'	Stadium: Azadi Stadium; Attendance: 5,000; Referee: Ali Asghar Momeni; Man of the Match: Milad Sarlak (Persepolis)

29 November 2021 7	Persepolis	1–0	Naft Masjed Soleyman	Tehran
18:30 IRST +03:30	Abdi 50'	Report	Amiri (yellow card) 68'; Eydi (yellow card) 90'	Stadium: Azadi Stadium; Referee: Koupal Nazemi; Man of the Match: Mehdi Torabi (Persepolis)
Note: Due to the COVID-19 pandemic in Iran, the match was played behind closed doors.

4 December 2021 8	Esteghlal	0–0	Persepolis	Tehran
16:15 IRST +03:30	Yamga (yellow card) 68'; Rezavand (yellow card) 77'; Moradmand (yellow card) 90+3'	Report	Kamyabinia (yellow card) 24'; Torabi (yellow card) 63'; Alishah (yellow card) 72'; Aghaei (yellow card) 90+2'	Stadium: Azadi Stadium; Referee: Mooud Bonyadifar; Man of the Match: Hamed Lak (Persepolis)
Note: Due to the COVID-19 pandemic in Iran, the match was played behind closed doors.

9 December 2021 9	Persepolis	2–2	Havadar	Tehran
18:00 IRST +03:30	Faraji 41'; S. Nemati 90+1'	Report	Hosseini 39'; Mohammadi 54' (yellow card) 55'; Bashagerdi (yellow card) 69'; Kordestani (yellow card) 83'; Abbasian (yellow card) 90+4'	Stadium: Azadi Stadium; Referee: Ali Safaei; Man of the Match: Omid Alishah (Persepolis)
Note: Due to the COVID-19 pandemic in Iran, the match was played behind closed doors.

15 December 2021 10	Paykan	1–3	Persepolis	Tehran
16:00 IRST +03:30	Azadeh (yellow card) 21'; Koushki 82' (pen.)		Abdi 18'; Aghaei (yellow card) 24'; Alekasir 64'; Alishah (yellow card) 79'; Lak (yellow card) 80'; Shojaei 90+4'	Stadium: Shahid Dastgerdi Stadium; Referee: Reza Mahdavi; Man of the Match: Vahid Amiri (Persepolis)
Note: Due to the COVID-19 pandemic in Iran, the match was played behind closed doors.

24 December 2021 11	Persepolis	2–0	Zob Ahan	Tehran
17:00 IRST +03:30	Sharifi (yellow card) 38'; Jafari 60' (o.g.); Hosseini (yellow card) 66'; Torabi 88' (pen.)	Report	Khodadadi (yellow card) 75'; Ghoreishi (yellow card) 86'	Stadium: Azadi Stadium; Referee: Mahdi Seyed Ali; Man of the Match: Omid Alishah (Persepolis)
Note: Due to the COVID-19 pandemic in Iran, the match was played behind closed doors.

29 December 2021 12	Sepahan	0–1	Persepolis	Arak
16:00 IRST +03:30	Ahmadzadeh (yellow card) 19'; Rafiei (yellow card) 41'; Gvelesiani (yellow card) 45'	Report	Kamyabinia 33'; A. Nemati (yellow card) 42'; Sarlak (yellow card) 45'; S. Nemati (yellow card) 79'; Shojaei (yellow card) 90+2'	Stadium: Imam Khomeini Stadium; Referee: Vahid Kazemi; Man of the Match: Kamal Kamyabinia (Persepolis)
Note: Due to the COVID-19 pandemic in Iran, the match was played behind closed doors.

3 January 2022 13	Persepolis	2–1	Tractor	Tehran
17:00 IRST +03:30	Shojaei (yellow card) 8'; Alekasir 10'; S. Nemati 55'; Torabi (penalty missed) 66'; Lak (yellow card) 80'; Faraji (yellow card) 87'	Report	Babaei 24'; Hosseini (yellow card) 40'; Najafi (yellow card) 58'; Ghaderi (yellow card) 64'	Stadium: Azadi Stadium; Referee: Payam Heidari; Man of the Match: Siamak Nemati (Persepolis)
Note: Due to the COVID-19 pandemic in Iran, the match was played behind closed doors.

8 January 2022 14	Padideh	1–1	Persepolis	Mashhad
15:00 IRST +03:30	Jafari (yellow card) 33'; Amiri 45' (o.g.); Bayrami (yellow card) 57'; Jalali Rad (yellow card) 86'; Zaer Kazemi (yellow card) 88' (yellow-red card) 90+1'; Hosseini (yellow card) 90+4'	Report	Zaer Kazemi 31' (o.g.); Aghaei (yellow card) 90'	Stadium: Samen Stadium; Referee: Mohammad Hossein Zahedifard; Man of the Match: Mojtaba Bijan (Padideh)
Note: Due to the COVID-19 pandemic in Iran, the match was played behind closed doors.

13 January 2022 15	Persepolis	1–0	Fajr Sepasi	Tehran
17:30 IRST +03:30	Torabi 69'; Abdi (yellow card) 89'; Pahlavan (yellow card) 90+4'	Report	Zarei (yellow card) 32'	Stadium: Azadi Stadium; Referee: Morteza Mansourian; Man of the Match: Mehdi Torabi (Persepolis)
Note: Due to the COVID-19 pandemic in Iran, the match was played behind closed doors.

22 January 2022 16	Persepolis	1–0	Foolad	Tehran
18:00 IRST +03:30	Abdi 49'; Safarov (yellow card) 55'; Sarlak (yellow card) 88'			Stadium: Azadi Stadium; Referee: Hassan Akrami; Man of the Match: Mehdi Abdi (Persepolis)
Note: Due to the COVID-19 pandemic in Iran, the match was played behind closed doors.

13 February 2022 17	Nassaji	1–3	Persepolis	Mashhad
17:00 IRST +03:30	Eslami 16'; Kalantari (yellow card) 28' (yellow-red card) 78'; Shojaei (yellow card) 48'; Eslami (yellow card) 90+7'		Kamyabinia 2'; Amiri 7'; Pahlavan (yellow card) 50'; Amiri (yellow card) 89'; Pakdel 90+1'; Hanonov (yellow card) 90+8'	Stadium: Imam Reza Stadium; Referee: Reza Mahdavi; Man of the Match: Vahid Amiri (Persepolis)
Note: Due to the COVID-19 pandemic in Iran, the match was played behind closed doors.

18 February 2022 18	Persepolis	2–0	Aluminium Arak	Tehran
19:30 IRST +03:30	Pakdel 76'; Amiri (yellow card) 87'; Asadi 90+4'	Report	Fakhreddini (yellow card) 45'	Stadium: Azadi Stadium; Referee: Payam Heidari; Man of the Match: Hamed Pakdel (Persepolis)
Note: Due to the COVID-19 pandemic in Iran, the match was played behind closed doors.

23 February 2022 19	Gol Gohar	1–1	Persepolis	Sirjan
17:00 IRST +03:30	Ashouri (yellow card) 14'; Sohrabian (yellow card) 22'; Kiros 33'; Barzay (yellow card) 49'; Khanzadeh (yellow card) 89'	Report	Pakdel 13'; Kamyabinia (yellow card) 30'; Asadi (yellow card) 71'	Stadium: Shahid Qasem Soleimani Stadium; Referee: Mohammad Hossein Torabian; Man of the Match: Kiros Stanlley (Gol Gohar)
Note: Due to the COVID-19 pandemic in Iran, the match was played behind closed doors.

28 February 2022 20	Persepolis	3–1	Mes Rafsanjan	Tehran
19:00 IRST +03:30	Abdi 19', 74'; Kamyabinia 34'; Aghaei (yellow card) 37'	Report	Aliyari 23'; Tavakoli (yellow card) 77'; Kaabi (yellow card) 90'	Stadium: Azadi Stadium; Referee: Ashkan Khorshidi; Man of the Match: Mehdi Abdi (Persepolis)
Note: Due to the COVID-19 pandemic in Iran, the match was played behind closed doors.

6 March 2022 21	Sanat Naft	2–0	Persepolis	Abadan
19:30 IRST +03:30	Ghobeishavi 7'; Beyt Saeed (yellow card) 21'; Ghobeishavi (yellow card) 60'; Motlaghzadeh 69'; Hamedifar (yellow card) 75'	Report	Pahlavan (yellow card) 80'	Stadium: Takhti Stadium; Referee: Mohammad Hossein Zahedifard; Man of the Match: Hassan Beyt Saeed (Sanat Naft)
Note: Due to the COVID-19 pandemic in Iran, the match was played behind closed doors.

11 March 2022 22	Naft Masjed Soleyman	1–2	Persepolis	Masjed Soleyman
18:00 IRST +03:30	Hasheminezhad (yellow card) 38'; Miri 77'; Eidi (yellow card) 87'	Report	Asadi 10', 20'; Asadi (yellow card) 26'	Stadium: Behnam Mohammadi Stadium; Referee: Ali Safaei; Man of the Match: Reza Asadi (Persepolis)
Note: Due to the COVID-19 pandemic in Iran, the match was played behind closed doors.

17 March 2022 23	Persepolis	1–1	Esteghlal	Tehran
19:00 IRST +03:30	Temirov (yellow card) 15'; Faraji (yellow card) 21'; A. Nemati 40'; Aghaei (yellow card) 66'; Rezaeian (yellow card) 68'	Report	Gestede 81'; Niknafs (yellow card) 87'; Hosseini (yellow card) 90+3'	Stadium: Azadi Stadium; Attendance: 20,000; Referee: Mahdi Seyed Ali; Man of the Match: Ali Nemati (Persepolis)

4 April 2022 24	Havadar	0–0	Persepolis	Tehran
20:45 IRST +03:30	Sattari (yellow card) 58'; Hosseini (yellow card) 83'	Report	Rezaeian (yellow card) 37'; Asadi (yellow card) 61'; Torabi (yellow card) 73'; Alishah (yellow card) 79'; Temirov (yellow card) 83'	Stadium: Shahid Dastgerdi Stadium; Attendance: NC; Referee: Hamid Haj Malek; Man of the Match: Moslem Haghshenas (Havadar)

4 May 2022 25	Persepolis	2–0	Paykan	Tehran
20:45 IRST +03:30	Pakdel 16'; Alishah (red card) 32'; A. Nemati 49'; A. Nemati (yellow card) 50'; Lak (yellow card) 85'	Report		Stadium: Azadi Stadium; Attendance: 17,000; Referee: Reza Adel; Man of the Match: Hamed Pakdel (Persepolis)

9 May 2022 26	Zob Ahan	1–1	Persepolis	Fooladshahr
18:30 IRST +03:30	Bagherpasand 2'; Bagherpasand (yellow card) 45+2'	Report	A. Nemati (yellow card) 12'; Temirov 57'; Temirov (yellow card) 57'; Amiri (yellow card) 86'	Stadium: Foolad Shahr Stadium; Attendance: 5,000; Referee: Payam Heidari; Man of the Match: Habib Far Abbasi (Zob Ahan)

14 May 2022 27	Persepolis	1–2	Sepahan	Sirjan
21:50 IRST +03:30	Kamyabinia (yellow card) 68'; A. Nemati 83'	Report	Alimohammadi (yellow card) 15'; Nejadmehdi 36'; Shahbazzadeh 48'; Esmaeilifar (yellow card) 82'	Stadium: Shahid Qasem Soleimani Stadium; Attendance: NA; Referee: Bijan Heydari; Man of the Match: Mohammad Nejadmehdi (Sepahan)

19 May 2022 28	Tractor	0–3	Persepolis	Tabriz
19:00 IRST +03:30				Stadium: Yadegar-e Emam Stadium; Attendance: 68,000; Referee: Reza Mahdavi
Note: Football Federation declared the match 3-0 in favor of Persepolis because of Tractor fans violence.

29 May 2022 29	Persepolis	2–1	Padideh	Tehran
20:00 IRST +03:30	A. Nemati 23'; Lak (yellow card) 50'; Torabi (yellow card) 56'; S. Nemati 59'; S. Nemati (yellow card) 62'	Report	Behzadi (yellow card) 19'; Rezazadeh 54'	Stadium: Azadi Stadium; Attendance: 2,000; Referee: Yasser Hamrang; Man of the Match: Siamak Nemati (Persepolis)

2 June 2022 30	Fajr Sepasi	0–1	Persepolis	Tehran
20:00 IRST +03:30	Zendehrouh (yellow card) 51'; Mansouri (yellow card) 80'	Report	Alishah 23'; Hosseini (yellow card) 90+3'	Stadium: Azadi Stadium; Attendance: NA; Referee: Rouhollah Sharifi; Man of the Match: Omid Alishah (Persepolis)

==== Score overview ====
Win Draw Loss

Opposition	Home score	Away score	Aggregate score
Aluminium Arak	2–0	1–0	2–1
Esteghlal	1–1	0–0	1–1
Foolad	1–0	1–3	4–1
Gol Gohar	1–1	1–1	2–2
Fajr Sepasi	1–0	0–1	2–0
Havadar	2–2	0–0	2–2
Mes Rafsanjan	3–1	1–1	4–2
Naft Masjed Soleyman	1–0	1–2	3–1
Nassaji	2–1	1–3	5–2
Padideh	2–1	1–1	3–2
Paykan	2–0	1–3	5–1
Sanat Naft	1–0	2–0	1–2
Sepahan	1–2	0–1	1–1
Tractor	2–1	0–3	5–1
Zob Ahan	2–0	1–1	3–2

=== Hazfi Cup ===
20 December 2021 Round of 32	Persepolis	4–0	Vista Toorbin	Tehran
17:30 IRST +03:30	Ebrahimi (yellow card) 30'; Sharifi 64'; S. Nemati 65'; Alekasir 80'; Shojaei 90+4'	Report		Stadium: Azadi Stadium; Referee: Rouhollah Sharifi; Man of the Match: Issa Alekasir (Persepolis)
Note: Due to the COVID-19 pandemic in Iran, the match was played behind closed doors.

17 January 2022 Round of 16	Zob Ahan	0–3	Persepolis	Fuladshahr
15:30 IRST +03:30	Pourali (yellow card) 29'; Khaleghifar (yellow card) 44'; Soltani Mehr (yellow card) 64'	Report	Amiri 35'; Abdi 62', 76'; Torabi (yellow card) 70'; Hosseini (yellow card) 73'	Stadium: Foolad Shahr Stadium; Referee: Mooud Bonyadifar; Man of the Match: Mehdi Abdi (Persepolis)
Note: Due to the COVID-19 pandemic in Iran, the match was played behind closed doors.

10 April 2022 Quarter Finals	Persepolis	2–3	Aluminium Arak	Tehran
20:30	Pahlavan 9'; Torabi 45+3' (pen.); Gohari (yellow card) 70'; Rezaeian (yellow card) 72'; Asadi (yellow card) 72'; Sarlak (yellow card) 90+2'; Pakdel (yellow card) 90+6'	Report	Ghaed Rahmati (yellow card) 5'; Azadi 20', 65'; Majidi (yellow card) 45'; Alinejad 52'; Azadi (penalty missed) 71'; Mohammadzadeh (yellow card) 72'	Stadium: Azadi Stadium; Attendance: 30,000; Referee: Vahid Kazemi; Man of the Match: Mohammad Alinejad (Aluminium Arak)

=== Super Cup ===
7 February 2022 Final	Foolad	1–0	Persepolis	Sirjan
17:15 IRST +03:30	Coulibaly 18'; Ansari (yellow card) 33'; Abshak (yellow card) 40'; Shahabbasi (yellow card) 50'; Bou Hamdan (yellow card) 66' (yellow-red card) 81'; Moradian (yellow card) 87'; Najjarian (yellow card) 90+1'	Report	Asadi (yellow card) 35'; Shiri (yellow card) 43' (yellow-red card) 63'	Stadium: Shahid Soleimani Stadium; Referee: Mohammad Reza Akbarian; Man of the Match: Moussa Coulibaly (Foolad)
Note: Due to the COVID-19 pandemic in Iran, the match was played behind closed doors.

=== AFC Champions League ===
==== 2021 ====
===== knockout stage =====
14 September 2021 Round of 16	Istiklol (Tajikistan)	0–1	Persepolis	Dushanbe, Tajikistan
19:30 UTC+4:30	Safarov (yellow card) 80'	Report	Faraji (yellow card) 19'; Sarlak (yellow card) 79'; Torabi 90'	Stadium: Pamir Stadium; Attendance: 17,200; Referee: Hiroyuki Kimura (Japan); Man of the Match: Mehdi Torabi (Persepolis)

16 October 2021 Quarter-final	Persepolis	0–3	(Saudi Arabia) Al-Hilal	Riyadh, Saudi Arabia
21:30 UTC+3:30	Asadi (yellow card) 19'; Aghaei (yellow card) 48'; Faraji (yellow card) 57'; Sharifi (yellow card) 80'	Report	Al-Dawsari 27'; Gomis 50', 70'; Marega (yellow card) 61'; Al-Bulaihi (yellow card) 72'	Stadium: Prince Faisal bin Fahd Stadium; Attendance: 14,877; Referee: Ryuji Sato (Japan); Man of the Match: Salem Al-Dawsari (Al-Hilal)
Note: Match played at the Prince Faisal bin Fahd Stadium in Riyadh, Saudi Arabia, instead of Persepolis' regular Azadi Stadium in Tehran.

==== 2022 ====
The AFC announced that Esteghlal and Persepolis had not satisfied the mandatory criteria of the AFC Club Licensing Regulations, and their licences were withdrawn by the AFC's independent Entry Control Body, and thus were declared ineligible to participate in the 2022 AFC Champions League.

== Statistics ==
=== Goal scorers ===
Place	Position	Nation	Number	Name	PGPL	Hazfi Cup	Super Cup	2021 ACL	Total
1	FW	(Iran)	16	Mehdi Abdi	7	2	0	0	9
2	FW	(Iran)	72	Issa Alekasir	4	1	0	0	5
2	MF	(Iran)	9	Mehdi Torabi	3	1	0	1	5
2	FW	(Iran)	40	Hamed Pakdel	5	0	0	0	5
5	MF	(Iran)	8	Reza Asadi	4	0	0	0	4
5	MF	(Iran)	88	Siamak Nemati	3	1	0	0	4
5	DF	(Iran)	6	Ali Nemati	4	0	0	0	4
8	MF	(Iran)	11	Kamal Kamyabinia	3	0	0	0	3
9	MF	(Iran)	23	Ali Shojaei	1	1	0	0	2
9	MF	(Iran)	19	Vahid Amiri	1	1	0	0	2
11	MF	(Iran)	10	Milad Sarlak	1	0	0	0	1
11	DF	(Iran)	3	Farshad Faraji	1	0	0	0	1
11	MF	(Iran)	18	Mohammad Sharifi	0	1	0	0	1
11	MF	(Iran)	14	Ehsan Pahlavan	0	1	0	0	1
11	FW	(Iran)	70	Sherzod Temirov	1	0	0	0	1
11	MF	(Iran)	2	Omid Alishah	1	0	0	0	1
Own goal					2	0	0	0	2
Other					3	0	0	0	3
Total					44	9	0	1	54
Last updated: 2 June 2022

=== Assists ===
Player left the club during the season.

Place	Position	Nation	Number	Name	PGPL	Hazfi Cup	Super Cup	2021 ACL	Total
1	MF	(Iran)	9	Mehdi Torabi	11	0	0	0	11
2	MF	(Iran)	2	Omid Alishah	4	1	0	0	5
2	DF	(Iran)	27	Ramin Rezaeian	5	0	0	0	5
4	MF	(Iran)	14	Ehsan Pahlavan	2	2	0	0	4
5	MF	(Iran)	8	Reza Asadi	2	0	0	1	3
5	MF	(Iran)	19	Vahid Amiri	3	0	0	0	3
7	FW	(Iran)	72	Issa Alekasir	0	2	0	0	2
7	MF	(Iran)	10	Milad Sarlak	1	1	0	0	2
7	FW	(Iran)	16	Mehdi Abdi	2	0	0	0	2
7	MF	(Iran)	23	Ali Shojaei	2	0	0	0	2
7	MF	(Iran)	88	Siamak Nemati	1	1	0	0	2
12	DF	(Iran)	17	Mehdi Shiri	1	0	0	0	1
12	DF	(Iran)	4	Jalal Hosseini	1	0	0	0	1
Total					35	7	0	1	43
Last updated: 2 June 2022

=== Goalkeeping ===
Player left the club during the season.

				PGPL			Hazfi Cup			2021 ACL			Super Cup			Total		
Rank	No	N	Name	M	GA	CS	M	GA	CS	M	GA	CS	M	GA	CS	M	GA	CS
1	81	(Iran)	Hamed Lak	22	16	9	2	0	2	2	3	1	1	1	0	27	20	12
2	99	(Iran)	Ahmad Gohari	5	3	2	1	3	0							6	6	2
3	44	(Croatia)	Božidar Radošević	2	2	0										2	2	0
4	34	(Iran)	Amir Mohammad Yousefi															
Total				29	21	11	3	3	2	2	3	1	1	1	0	35	28	14
Last updated: 2 June 2022

=== Man of the Match ===
Place	Position	Nation	Number	Name	PGPL	Hazfi Cup	Super Cup	2021 ACL	Total
1	FW	(Iran)	16	Mehdi Abdi	3	1	0	0	4
2	MF	(Iran)	9	Mehdi Torabi	2	0	0	1	3
2	MF	(Iran)	2	Omid Alishah	3	0	0	0	3
4	MF	(Iran)	19	Vahid Amiri	2	0	0	0	2
4	MF	(Iran)	8	Reza Asadi	2	0	0	0	2
4	FW	(Iran)	40	Hamed Pakdel	2	0	0	0	2
4	MF	(Iran)	88	Siamak Nemati	2	0	0	0	2
8	DF	(Iran)	4	Jalal Hosseini	1	0	0	0	1
8	MF	(Iran)	10	Milad Sarlak	1	0	0	0	1
8	GK	(Iran)	81	Hamed Lak	1	0	0	0	1
8	FW	(Iran)	72	Issa Alekasir	0	1	0	0	1
8	MF	(Iran)	11	Kamal Kamyabinia	1	0	0	0	1
Total					20	2	0	1	23
Last updated: 2 June 2022

=== Disciplinary record ===
Includes all competitive matches. Players with 1 card or more are included only.

Player left the club during the season.

				PGPL			Hazfi Cup			2021 ACL			Super Cup			Total		
No	P	N	Name	Yellow card	Double yellow card	Red card	Yellow card	Double yellow card	Red card	Yellow card	Double yellow card	Red card	Yellow card	Double yellow card	Red card	Yellow card	Double yellow card	Red card
2	MF	(Iran)	Omid Alishah	3	0	1	0	0	0	0	0	0	0	0	0	3	0	1
3	DF	(Iran)	Farshad Faraji	3	0	0	0	0	0	2	0	0	0	0	0	5	0	0
4	DF	(Iran)	Jalal Hosseini	3	0	0	1	0	0	0	0	0	0	0	0	4	0	0
5	DF	(Iran)	Alireza Ebrahimi	0	0	0	1	0	0	0	0	0	0	0	0	1	0	0
6	DF	(Iran)	Ali Nemati	3	0	0	0	0	0	0	0	0	0	0	0	3	0	0
8	MF	(Iran)	Reza Asadi	3	0	0	1	0	0	1	0	0	1	0	0	6	0	0
9	MF	(Iran)	Mehdi Torabi	5	0	0	1	0	0	0	0	0	0	0	0	6	0	0
10	MF	(Iran)	Milad Sarlak	1	0	0	1	0	0	1	0	0	0	0	0	3	0	0
11	MF	(Iran)	Kamal Kamyabinia	3	0	0	0	0	0	0	0	0	0	0	0	3	0	0
14	MF	(Iran)	Ehsan Pahlavan	2	0	0	0	0	0	0	0	0	0	0	0	2	0	0
16	FW	(Iran)	Mehdi Abdi	1	0	0	0	0	0	0	0	0	0	0	0	1	0	0
17	DF	(Iran)	Mehdi Shiri	0	0	0	0	0	0	0	0	0	0	1	0	0	1	0
18	MF	(Iran)	Mohammad Sharifi	0	0	0	0	0	0	1	0	0	0	0	0	1	0	0
19	MF	(Iran)	Vahid Amiri	3	0	0	0	0	0	0	0	0	0	0	0	3	0	0
23	MF	(Iran)	Ali Shojaei	2	0	0	0	0	0	0	0	0	0	0	0	2	0	0
27	DF	(Iran)	Ramin Rezaeian	2	0	0	1	0	0	0	0	0	0	0	0	3	0	0
55	DF	(Tajikistan)	Manuchehr Safarov	1	0	0	0	0	0	0	0	0	0	0	0	1	0	0
40	FW	(Iran)	Hamed Pakdel	0	0	0	1	0	0	0	0	0	0	0	0	1	0	0
66	DF	(Tajikistan)	Vahdat Hanonov	1	0	0	0	0	0	0	0	0	0	0	0	1	0	0
70	FW	(Uzbekistan)	Sherzod Temirov	2	0	0	0	0	0	0	0	0	0	0	0	2	0	0
72	FW	(Iran)	Issa Alekasir	1	0	0	0	0	0	0	0	0	0	0	0	1	0	0
77	DF	(Iran)	Saeid Aghaei	5	0	0	0	0	0	1	0	0	0	0	0	6	0	0
81	GK	(Iran)	Hamed Lak	4	0	0	0	0	0	0	0	0	0	0	0	4	0	0
88	MF	(Iran)	Siamak Nemati	3	0	0	0	0	0	0	0	0	0	0	0	3	0	0
99	GK	(Iran)	Ahmad Gohari	0	0	0	1	0	0	0	0	0	0	0	0	1	0	0
Total				51	0	1	8	0	0	6	0	0	1	1	0	66	1	1

Last updated: 2 June 2022.
Source: Competitive matches

== Club ==
=== Kit ===
Supplier: (Germany) Uhlsport

First half season and 2021 ACL

Home Kit	Away Kit	Third Kit
