= 2023–24 Tractor S.C. season =

Tractor
2023–24 season
- Chairman: Hooshang Nasirzadeh
- Manager: Paco Jémez
- Stadium: Sahand Stadium
- Pro League: 4th
- Hazfi Cup: Quarter-finals
- AFC Champions League: Qualifying play-offs
- Average home league attendance: 31,923
Home colours	Away colours

The 2023–24 season is the Tractor Sport Club's 16th season in the Pro League, and their 15th consecutive season in the top division of Iranian Football. They are also competing in the Hazfi Cup and AFC Champions League.

== Players ==
No.	Pos.	Nation	Player
1	GK	(Iran) IRN	Hossein Pour Hamidi
2	DF	(Iran) IRN	Mehdi Shiri
3	DF	(Iran) IRN	Shojae Khalilzadeh (captain)
4	DF	(Iran) IRN	Mohammad Aghajanpour
5	MF	(Iraq) IRQ	Safaa Hadi
6	MF	(Iran) IRN	Mehdi Hosseini
7	MF	(Brazil) BRA	Gustavo Vagenin
9	MF	(Iran) IRN	Amirhossein Hosseinzadeh
10	MF	(Portugal) POR	Ricardo Alves
14	DF	(Iran) IRN	Milad Kor^{U21}
16	FW	(Iran) IRN	Mehdi Abdi (on loan from Persepolis)
17	DF	(Iran) IRN	Saeid Karimazar^{U23}
19	FW	(Serbia) SRB	Milos Deletic
20	FW	(Iran) IRN	Mehdi Hashemnejad^{U23}
21	GK	(Iran) IRN	Ehsan Moradian

No.	Pos.	Nation	Player
22	DF	(Iran) IRN	Mohammad Naderi
33	DF	(Iran) IRN	Aref Aghasi
49	GK	(Iran) IRN	Adib Zarei^{U21}
66	MF	(Iran) IRN	Behzad Salami^{U23}
72	FW	(Iran) IRN	Arsalan Motahari
75	DF	(Iran) IRN	Mohammad Hosseini
78	FW	(Iran) IRN	Rahman Jafari
88	MF	(Iran) IRN	Siamak Nemati
90	FW	(Iran) IRN	Sajjad Ashouri
91	FW	(Iran) IRN	Amirreza Jeddi^{U21}
93	MF	(Iran) IRN	Mehdi Shabani^{U23}
95	DF	(Iran) IRN	Morteza Javaheri^{U23}
96	DF	(Iran) IRN	Abolfazl Rezaei^{U21}
97	FW	(Iran) IRN	Amirali Khorrami^{U21}
99	FW	(Iran) IRN	Amir Ebrahimzadeh^{U21}

== Transfers ==
=== Summer ===
In:

No.	Pos.	Nation	Player
1	GK	(Iran) IRN	Hossein Pour Hamidi (Loan return from Aluminium Arak)
12	GK	(Iran) IRN	Adib Zarei (from Shahin Bushehr)
3	DF	(Iran) IRN	Shojae Khalilzadeh (from (Qatar) Al Ahli)
77	DF	(Iran) IRN	Saeid Aghaei (from Foolad)
2	DF	(Iran) IRN	Mehdi Shiri (from Foolad)
20	MF	(Iran) IRN	Mehdi Hosseini (from Mes Rafsanjan)
21	DF	(Iran) IRN	Aref Aghasi (from Foolad)
8	MF	(Spain) ESP	Álvaro Jiménez (On loan from (Spain) Cádiz)
16	MF	(Iran) IRN	Siamak Nemati (from Persepolis)
29	FW	(Iran) IRN	Aref Rostami (from Mes Kerman)
22	DF	(Iran) IRN	Mohammad Naderi (from (Turkey) Altay)
99	MF	(Iran) IRN	Amirhossein Hosseinzadeh (from (Belgium) Charleroi)
80	MF	(Iran) IRN	Mohammadreza Shakibkhou (from Aluminium Arak)
16	FW	(Iran) IRN	Mehdi Abdi (On loan from Persepolis)

Out:

No.	Pos.	Nation	Player
1	GK	(Iran) IRN	Mohammad Reza Akhbari (to Gol Gohar)
2	DF	(Iran) IRN	Abolfazl Razzaghpour (to Gol Gohar)
33	FW	(Iran) IRN	Mohammad Abbaszadeh (to Foolad)
99	FW	(Iran) IRN	Kaveh Rezaei (to Sepahan)
17	DF	(Iran) IRN	Pouria Aria Kia (to Zob Ahan)
9	MF	(Iran) IRN	Reza Asadi (to Sepahan)
8	MF	(Iran) IRN	Shahin Saghebi (to Paykan)
96	FW	(Iran) IRN	Mohammadreza Abbasi (to Nassaji Mazandaran)
6	MF	(Iran) IRN	Mehdi Kiani (to Kheybar Khorramabad)
30	GK	(Iran) IRN	Mehdi Haghighat (to Mes Sungun)
4	DF	(Iran) IRN	Hadi Mohammadi (to Sepahan)
19	FW	(Iran) IRN	Hamed Pakdel (to Paykan)
19	DF	(Iran) IRN	Arash Ghaderi (to Zob Ahan)
23	DF	(Iran) IRN	Sajjad Danaei (to Kheybar Khorramabad)
40	GK	(Iran) IRN	Reza Kakhsaz (to Naft MIS)
69	GK	(Iran) IRN	Reza Seyf Ahmadi (Unattached)
77	MF	(Spain) ESP	Jaime Romero (Unattached)

== Competitions ==
=== Overview ===
Competition	Starting round	Record							
Competition	Starting round	Pld	W	D	L	GF	GA	GD	Win %
Pro League	Matchday 1	15	9	1	5	21	10	+11	60.00
Hazfi Cup	Round of 32	0	0	0	0	0	0	+0	—
AFC Champions League	Qualifying play-off	1	0	0	1	1	3	−2	0.00
Total		16	9	1	6	22	13	+9	56.25

Last updated: 30 December 2023.
Source: Competitions

=== Persian Gulf Pro League ===
==== Standings ====
Pos	Team	Pld	W	D	L	GF	GA	GD	Pts	Qualification or relegation
2	Esteghlal	30	19	10	1	40	15	+25	67	Qualification for the 2024–25 AFC Champions League Elite League stage
3	Sepahan	30	17	6	7	53	26	+27	57	Qualification for the 2024–25 AFC Champions League Elite qualifying play-offs (Note: Qualified as the 2023–24 Hazfi Cup winners.)
4	Tractor	30	16	6	8	42	22	+20	54	Qualification for the 2024–25 AFC Champions League Two group stage
5	Zob Ahan	30	11	9	10	30	29	+1	42	
6	Malavan	30	10	11	9	31	26	+5	41	

Source: Iran Football League Organization - League Full Table, Iplstats
Rules for classification: 1) Points; 2) Head-to-head points; 3) Head-to-head goal difference; 4) Total goal difference; 5) Total goals scored; 6) Play-off at neutral venue.
(Note: Head-to-head record is used only after all the matches between the teams in question have been played).

==== Results by round ====
Round	1	2	4	3	5	7	6	8	9	10	11	12	13	14	15	16	17	18	19	20	21	22	23	24	25	26	27	28	29	30
Ground	A	H	H	A	A	A	H	A	H	A	H	A	H	A	H	H	A	H	A	H	A	H	H	A	H	A	H	A	H	A
Result	L	L	W	W	W	W	L	L	W	L	W	W	W	D	W	D	L	W	D	W	W	D	L	L	D	W	W	D	W	W
Position	13	14	11	6	6	6	5	7	6	7	7	4	4	4	4	4	4	4	3	3	3	3	4	4	4	4	4	4	4	4
Points	0	0	3	6	9	12	12	12	15	15	18	21	24	25	28															

Updated to match(es) played on 13 July 2024. Source: "Ipl".
A = Away; H = Home; W = Win; D = Draw; L = Loss; P = Postponed

==== Matches ====
The league fixtures were announced on 9 August.

Win Draw Loss Fixtures

10 August 2023 1	Sepahan	3–1	Tractor	Isfahan
19:00 IRST (UTC+03:30)	Zakipour (yellow card) 6'; Moghanlou 11'; Shekari (yellow card) 12', (goal) 60'; Nilson (yellow card) 15' (yellow-red card) 79'; Asadi 25'; Ahmadzadeh (yellow card) 45+1'; Daneshgar (yellow card) 45+5'; Rezaei (yellow card) 90+7'	Report	Hadi (yellow card) 45+5' (yellow-red card) 86'; Karimazar 89', (yellow card) 90'; Aghajanpour (yellow card) 90+1'; Alves (yellow card) 90+6'; Khalilzadeh (yellow card) 90+7'	Stadium: Naghsh-e Jahan; Attendance: 35,000; Referee: Payam Heydari

16 August 2023 2	Tractor	0–1	Persepolis	Tabriz
19:00 IRST (UTC+03:30)		Report	Sadeghi 42'	Stadium: Yadegar-e Emam; Attendance: 80,000; Referee: Amir Arab Baraghi

28 August 2023 4	Tractor	1–0	Mes Rafsanjan	Tabriz
20:00 IRST (UTC+03:30)	Abdi 85'; Gustavo (yellow card) 86'; Karimazar (yellow card) 88'; Shiri (yellow card) 90+2'	Report	Adnan (yellow card) 57'; Khodabandelou (yellow card) 81'	Stadium: Yadegar-e Emam; Attendance: 20,000; Referee: Yaser Hamrang

2 September 2023 3	Esteghlal Khuzestan	0–1	Tractor	Ahvaz
21:30 IRST (UTC+03:30)	Shoushtari (yellow card) 35'; Motlaghzadeh (yellow card) 65'; Kazemi (yellow card) 85'; Karimzadeh (yellow card) 90+8'	Report	Khalilzadeh (yellow card) 45+3'; Gustavo (yellow card) 85', (goal) 90+2'; Hadi (yellow card) 90+8'	Stadium: Ghadir Stadium; Attendance: 6,000; Referee: Seyed Reza Mahdavi

20 September 2023 5	Havadar	0–1	Tractor	Tehran
18:00 IRST (UTC+03:30)	Eslamikhah (yellow card) 12'; Ghaseminejad (yellow card) 12'; Pasandideh (yellow card) 61'	Report	Aghasi 16'; Gustavo (yellow card) 28'; Shiri (yellow card) 56'; Pour Hamidi (yellow card) 70'; Khalilzadeh (yellow card) 83'; Ghanbari (yellow card) 90+2'	Stadium: Shahid Dastgerdi Stadium; Attendance: 0 Referee: Ali Baay

5 October 2023 7	Aluminium	0–4	Tractor	Arak
17:15 IRST (UTC+03:30)		Report	Khalilzadeh (yellow card) 25'; Abdi (yellow card) 26' , (goal) 77'; Nemati 41'; Jiménez (yellow card) 65'; Alves (yellow card) 67'; Rostami 87'; Hosseinzadeh 90+3'	Stadium: Imam Khomeini Stadium; Attendance: 3,000; Referee: Abbas Raki

21 October 2023 6	Tractor	2–3	Shams Azar	Tabriz
18:15 IRST (UTC+03:30)	Aghajanpour (yellow card) 16'; Abdi 70' (pen.); Alves 82'	Report	Sarabadani 17' (pen.); Rezaei 33' , (yellow card) 49'; Nesaei 46'; Moradi (yellow card) 90+2' Jafarpour (yellow card) 90+8' Emamali (yellow card) 90+10'	Stadium: Yadegar-e Emam; Attendance: 25,000; Referee: Rouhollah Sharifi

8	Zob Ahan	1–0	Tractor
		Report

9	Tractor	3–0	Nassaji Mazandaran
		Report

10	Esteghlal	2–0	Tractor
		Report

11	Tractor	2–0	Foolad
		Report

12	Gol Gohar	0–1	Tractor
		Report

13	Tractor	2–0	Paykan
		Report

14	Malavan	0–0	Tractor
		Report

15	Tractor	3–0	Sanat Naft
		Report

16	Tractor	0–0	Sepahan
		Report

17	Persepolis	2–0	Tractor
		Report

18	Tractor	2–0	Esteghlal Khuzestan
		Report

19	Mes Rafsanjan	1–1	Tractor
		Report

20	Tractor	4–2	Havadar
		Report

21	Shams Azar	0–2	Tractor
		Report

22	Tractor	1–1	Aluminium Arak
		Report

23	Tractor	1–4	Zob Ahan
		Report

24	Nassaji Mazandaran	1–0	Tractor
		Report

25	Tractor	0–0	Esteghlal
		Report

26	Foolad	0–2	Tractor
		Report

27	Tractor	2–0	Gol Gohar
		Report

28	Paykan	0–0	Tractor
		Report

29	Tractor	3–1	Malavan
		Report

30	Sanat Naft	0–3	Tractor
		Report

=== Hazfi Cup ===
8 February 2024 Round of 32	Chooka Talesh	0–3	Tractor
Note: Chooka Talesh withdrew.

26 April 2024 Round of 16	Tractor	1–1 (a.e.t.) (3–1 p)	Zob Ahan	Tabriz
18:30				Stadium: Yadegar-e Emam Stadium

16 May 2024 Quarter-final	Tractor	0–1 (a.e.t.)	Mes Rafsanjan	Tabriz
19:00			Mohammad Mehdi Mohebi 91'	Stadium: Yadegar-e Emam Stadium

=== AFC Champions League ===
22 August 2023 Play-off round	Tractor (Iran)	1–3	(United Arab Emirates) Sharjah	Yadegar-e Emam Stadium, Tabriz
19:30 UTC+3:30	Hashemnejad 86'	Report	Abdulrahman 25'; Camara 84'; Lucas 90'	Attendance: 69,594; Referee: Kim Jong-hyeok (South Korea)
