= 2023–24 F.C. Nassaji Mazandaran season =

Nassaji Mazandaran
2023–24 season
- Owner: Reza Haddadian
- Chairman: Sadegh Dorodgar
- Manager: Lucas Alcaraz
- Stadium: Vatani Stadium
- Persian Gulf Pro League: Pre-Season
- Hazfi Cup: Round of 32
- AFC Champions League: Group stage
Home colours	Away colours
- All statistics correct as of 30 June 2023.

The 2023–24 season is the 6th season of F.C. Nassaji in the Iranian Football Pro League. In addition to the domestic league, Nassaji also competes in this season's Hazfi Cup and AFC Champions League.

== Transfers ==
=== Summer ===
In:

No.	Pos.	Nation	Player
—	GK	IRI	Rashid Mazaheri (from Paykan)
—	DF	IRI	Amir Mohammad Houshmand (from Aluminium)
—	DF	IRI	Vahid Mohammadzadeh (from Aluminium)
—	DF	IRI	Ehsan Hosseini (from Aluminium)
—	MF	IRI	Mahmoud Ghaed Rahmati (from Aluminium)
—	FW	IRI	Mohammad Reza Azadi (from Aluminium)
—	FW	IRI	Mohammadreza Abbasi (from Tractor)
—	MF	IRI	Farshid Esmaeili (from Foolad)
—	FW	IRQ	Alaa Abbas (from (Iraq) Al-Zawraa)
—	MF	IRI	Esmail Babaei (from Naft MIS)
—	FW	IRI	Aria Barzegar (from Esteghlal)

Out:

No.	Pos.	Nation	Player
2	DF	IRI	Ehsan Ghahari (to Aluminium Arak)
1	GK	IRI	Alireza Haghighi (to Havadar)
10	MF	IRI	Ali Shojaei (to Tractor)
8	MF	IRI	Ayoub Kalantari (to Havadar)
70	MF	IRI	Reza Jafari (to Malavan)
99	FW	IRI	Karim Eslami (to Havadar)
18	DF	IRI	Hamed Shiri (retired)
55	DF	IRI	Alireza Ebrahimi (to Mes Kerman)
15	MF	IRI	Ahmad Abdollahzadeh (to Esteghlal Khuzestan)
5	MF	IRI	Akbar Sadeghi
26	FW	MLI	Adama Niane
6	DF	IRI	Shahin Taherkhani
19	FW	IRI	Erfan Golmohammadi
20	MF	IRI	Mohsen Karimi
88	MF	IRI	Mohammad Sharifi
9	FW	IRI	Mehdi Nazari
23	DF	IRI	Mostafa Javadian
22	GK	IRI	Mohammad Mehdi Hamidi

== Competitions ==
=== Overview ===
Competition	Starting round	Record							
Competition	Starting round	Pld	W	D	L	GF	GA	GD	Win %
Pro League	Matchday 1	1	0	1	0	1	1	+0	0.00
Hazfi Cup	Round of 32	0	0	0	0	0	0	+0	—
AFC Champions League	Group stage	0	0	0	0	0	0	+0	—
Total		1	0	1	0	1	1	+0	0.00

Last updated: 12 August 2023.
Source: Competitions

=== Persian Gulf Pro League ===
==== Standings ====
Pos	Team	Pld	W	D	L	GF	GA	GD	Pts
10	Mes Rafsanjan	30	8	11	11	32	37	−5	35
11	Foolad	30	7	8	15	20	40	−20	29 (Note: Foolad finished ahead of Nassaji Mazandaran and Havadar on head-to-head points: Foolad 10, Nassaji Mazandaran 4, Havadar 2)
12	Nassaji Mazandaran	30	7	8	15	27	36	−9	29
13	Havadar	30	6	11	13	31	48	−17	29
14	Esteghlal Khuzestan	30	6	10	14	31	42	−11	28

Source: Iran Football League Organization - League Full Table, Iplstats
Rules for classification: 1) Points; 2) Head-to-head points; 3) Head-to-head goal difference; 4) Total goal difference; 5) Total goals scored; 6) Play-off at neutral venue.
(Note: Head-to-head record is used only after all the matches between the teams in question have been played).

==== Results by round ====
Round	1	2	3	4	5	6	7	8	9	10	11	12	13	14	15	16	17	18	19	20	21	22	23	24	25	26	27	28	29	30
Ground	H	A																												
Result	D	D																												
Position	8	9																												

Updated to match(es) played on 18 August 2023. Source: "Ipl".
A = Away; H = Home; W = Win; D = Draw; L = Loss; P = Postponed

=== AFC Champions League ===
Sepahan will enter the tournament in the Group stage.
