= Mohammad Aghajanpour =

Iranian footballer

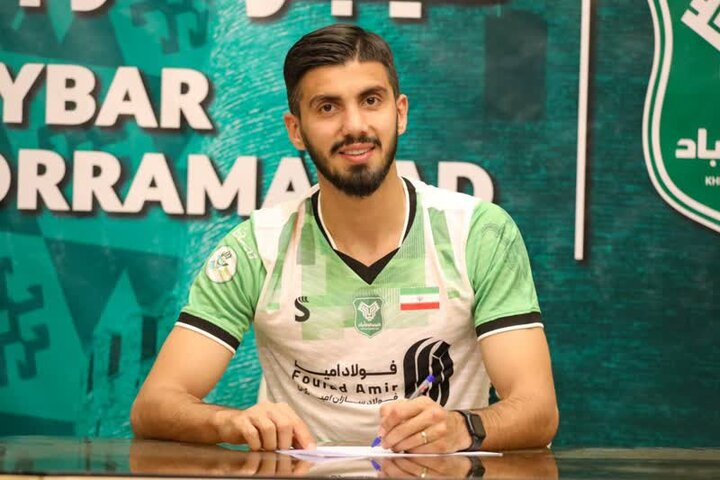

Personal information
- Full name: Mohammad Aghajanpour
- Date of birth: April 20, 1997 (age 29)
- Place of birth: Babol, Iran
- Height: 1.86 m (6 ft 1 in)
- Position: Defender

Team information
- Current team: Sanat Naft Abadan
- Number: 2

Youth career
- –2016: Paykan
- 2016: Saipa

Senior career*
Years	Team	Apps	(Gls)
2016–2017	Aluminium Arak	6	(1)
2017–2019	Padideh	16	(0)
2019–2020	Shahr Khodro	7	(0)
2020–2021	Mes Rafsanjan	12	(0)
2021–2022	Gol Gohar	16	(0)
2022–2025	Tractor	46	(4)
2025–2026	Kheybar Khorramabad	27	(0)
2026–	Sanat Naft	11	(0)

International career^{‡}
2016–	Iran U20	1	(1)
- * Club domestic league appearances and goals as of 12 May 2017 ‡ National team caps and goals as of 6 March 2017

Mohammad Aghajanpour (Persian: محمد آقاجان پور متی کلائی, born April 20, 1997) is an Iranian football defender who currently plays for Iranian club Sanat Naft Abadan in the Persian Gulf Pro League.

== Career statistics ==
=== Club ===
Club	Season	League			Cup		Continental		Total	
Club	Season	League	Apps	Goals	Apps	Goals	Apps	Goals	Apps	Goals
Aluminium	2016-17	Azadegan League	5	1	0	0	0	0	5	1
Shahr Khodro	2017-18	Persian Gulf Pro League	6	0	0	0	0	0	6	0
Shahr Khodro	2018-19	Persian Gulf Pro League	10	0	1	0	0	0	11	0
Shahr Khodro	2019-20	Persian Gulf Pro League	7	0	0	0	2	0	9	0
Shahr Khodro	Total		23	0	1	0	2	0	26	0
Mes	2020-21	Persian Gulf Pro League	13	0	0	0	0	0	13	0
Gol Gohar	2020-21	Persian Gulf Pro League	9	0	3	0	0	0	12	0
Gol Gohar	2021-22	Persian Gulf Pro League	5	0	1	0	0	0	6	0
Gol Gohar	Total		14	0	4	0	0	0	18	0
Tractor	2021-22	Persian Gulf Pro League	5	1	0	0	0	0	5	1
Tractor	2022-23	Persian Gulf Pro League	26	3	1	0	0	0	27	3
Tractor	2023-24	Persian Gulf Pro League	12	0	1	0	0	0	13	0
Tractor	Total		43	4	2	0	0	0	45	4
Career Total			85	5	7	0	2	0	94	5
