= Nono (footballer, born 1993) =

Spanish footballer (born 1993)

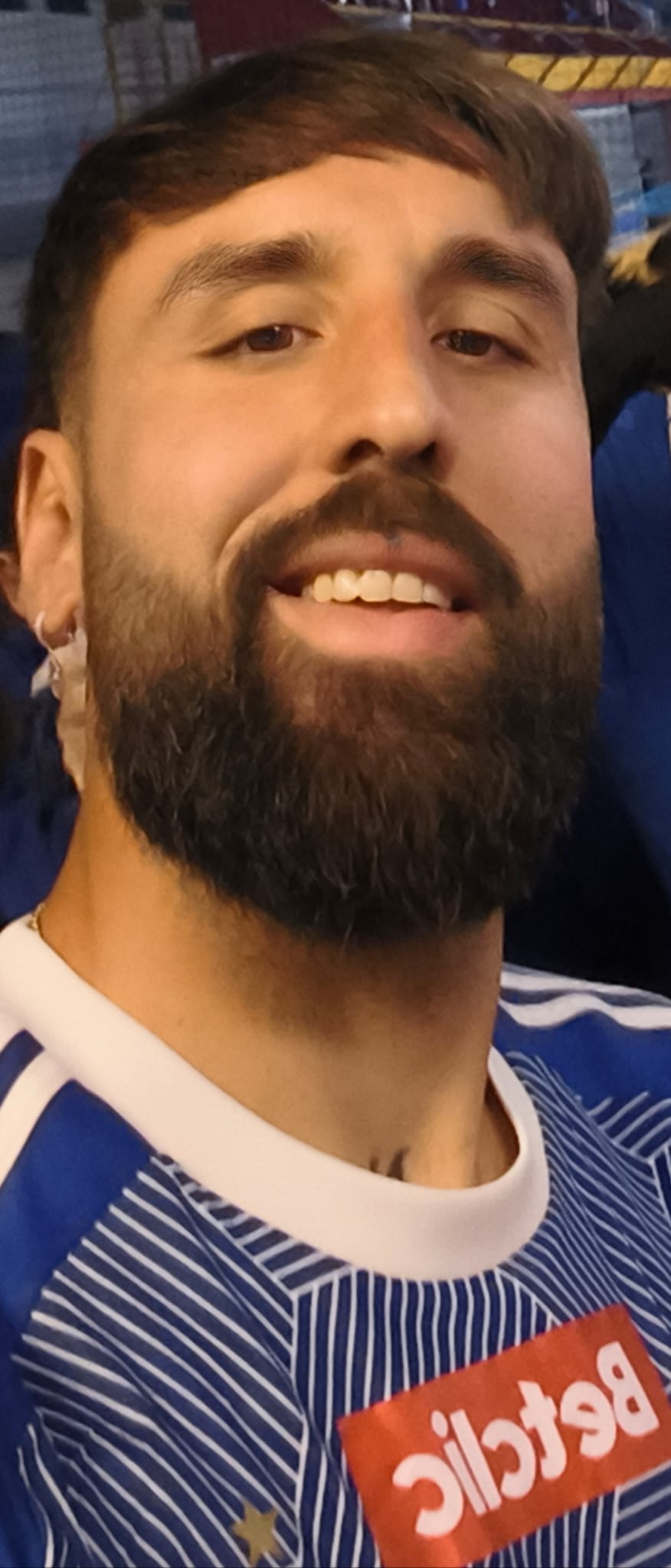
- Nono in 2026

Personal information
- Full name: José Antonio Delgado Villar
- Date of birth: 30 March 1993 (age 33)
- Place of birth: El Puerto de Santa María, Spain
- Height: 1.78 m (5 ft 10 in)
- Position: Midfielder

Youth career
- 2007–2008: Atlético Madrid
- 2008–2011: Betis

Senior career*
Years	Team	Apps	(Gls)
2011–2013	Betis B	46	(5)
2012–2015	Betis	43	(0)
2015	→ Sandhausen (loan)	0	(0)
2015–2016	Elche	9	(0)
2016	→ UCAM Murcia (loan)	13	(1)
2016–2017	Diósgyőri	40	(3)
2018–2021	Slovan Bratislava	71	(6)
2021	Slovan Bratislava B	1	(0)
2021–2022	Honvéd	16	(2)
2022–2023	Damac	33	(4)
2023–2024	Nassaji	9	(1)
2024–2026	Ruch Chorzów	15	(0)

International career
2012	Spain U19	6	(0)
2012	Spain U20	5	(1)
Medal record
Men's Football
Representing Spain
European Under-19 Championship
Winner	2012 Estonia
- * Club domestic league appearances and goals as of 12:47, 5 March 2026 (UTC)

José Antonio Delgado Villar (born 30 March 1993), known as Nono, is a Spanish professional footballer who plays as a central midfielder.

== Club career ==
=== Betis ===
Born in El Puerto de Santa María, Province of Cádiz, Nono joined Real Betis' youth system at the age of 15 after a brief spell with Atlético Madrid. In the 2011–12 season he made his debut as a senior, being a starter with the reserves in the Segunda División B.

Nono made his official debut with the Andalusians' first team on 5 May 2012, playing 74 minutes in a 2–1 La Liga away loss against Sporting de Gijón. He contributed 15 matches and 589 minutes of action in his first full campaign, helping the side finish seventh and qualify for the UEFA Europa League.

Nono subsequently helped Betis reach the Europa League's round of 16. He scored once in seven appearances, in the 2–0 away win over FC Rubin Kazan on 27 February 2014; in the next stage, however, he missed a penalty in the shootout against fellow Spaniards Sevilla FC, who went through 4–3.

=== Elche, UCAM and Hungary ===
On 2 February 2015, looking for more playing time, Nono was loaned to 2. Bundesliga's SV Sandhausen until June. On 17 July, after making no competitive appearances for the Germans, he terminated his contract with Betis and moved to Elche CF from Segunda División on 11 August.

On 1 February 2016, Nono returned to the third tier after being loaned to UCAM Murcia CF. In the ensuing summer, he moved abroad again and signed with Hungarian club Diósgyőri VTK, where he shared teams with compatriot Diego Vela.

=== Slovan Bratislava ===
In February 2018, Nono joined ŠK Slovan Bratislava on a four-and-a-half-year deal. During his spell in Slovakia, he won three Super Liga championships and as many domestic cups.

=== Later career ===
Nono started 2021–22 again in the Hungarian Nemzeti Bajnokság I, with Budapest Honvéd FC. On 31 January 2022 he switched countries again, agreeing to a one-and-a-half-year contract at Damac FC of the Saudi Professional League.

Nono continued competing abroad in the following seasons, with F.C. Nassaji Mazandaran (Persian Gulf Pro League) and Ruch Chorzów (Polish I liga).

== Career statistics ==
As of match played on 23 November 2025

Appearances and goals by club, season and competition
Club	Season	League			National cup (Note: Includes Copa del Rey, Magyar Kupa, Slovak Cup, King's Cup, Hazfi Cup, Polish Cup)		Other		Total	
Club	Season	Division	Apps	Goals	Apps	Goals	Apps	Goals	Apps	Goals
Betis B	2011–12	Segunda División B	33	2	—		—		33	2
Betis B	2012–13	Segunda División B	13	3	—		—		13	3
Betis B	Total		46	5	—		—		46	5
Betis	2011–12	La Liga	2	0	0	0	—		2	0
Betis	2012–13	La Liga	15	0	4	0	—		19	0
Betis	2013–14	La Liga	22	0	3	0	7 (Note: Appearances in UEFA Europa League)	1	32	1
Betis	2014–15	Segunda División	4	0	1	0	—		5	0
Betis	Total		43	0	8	0	7	1	58	1
Sandhausen (loan)	2014–15	2. Bundesliga	0	0	0	0	—		0	0
Elche	2015–16	Segunda División	9	0	1	1	—		10	1
UCAM Murcia (loan)	2015–16	Segunda División B	13	1	0	0	3 (Note: Appearances in Segunda División B play-offs)	0	16	1
Diósgyőri	2016–17	Nemzeti Bajnokság I	23	1	6	1	—		29	2
Diósgyőri	2017–18	Nemzeti Bajnokság I	17	2	1	0	—		18	2
Diósgyőri	Total		40	3	7	1	—		47	4
Slovan Bratislava	2017–18	Slovak Super Liga	10	0	4	0	—		14	0
Slovan Bratislava	2018–19	Slovak Super Liga	14	0	0	0	6	0	20	0
Slovan Bratislava	2019–20	Slovak Super Liga	21	4	7	3	5	1	33	8
Slovan Bratislava	2020–21	Slovak Super Liga	26	2	6	0	1	0	33	2
Slovan Bratislava	Total		71	6	17	3	12	1	100	10
Slovan Bratislava B	2020–21	2. Liga	1	0	—		—		1	0
Honvéd	2021–22	Nemzeti Bajnokság I	16	2	2	1	—		18	3
Damac	2021–22	Saudi Pro League	10	1	—		—		10	1
Damac	2022–23	Saudi Pro League	23	3	1	0	—		24	3
Damac	Total		33	4	1	0	—		34	4
Nassaji	2023–24	Persian Gulf Pro League	9	1	1	0	4 (Note: Appearances in AFC Champions League)	0	14	1
Ruch Chorzów	2024–25	I liga	12	0	2	0	—		14	0
Ruch Chorzów	2025–26	I liga	3	0	1	0	—		4	0
Ruch Chorzów	Total		15	0	3	0	—		18	0
Career total			296	22	40	6	26	2	362	30

== Honours ==
Betis

- Segunda División: 2014–15

UCAM Murcia

- Segunda División B: 2015–16

Slovan Bratislava

- Slovak Super Liga: 2018–19, 2019–20, 2020–21
- Slovak Cup: 2017–18, 2019–20, 2020–21

Spain U19

- UEFA European Under-19 Championship: 2012
