= Sajjad Ashouri =

Iranian Striker

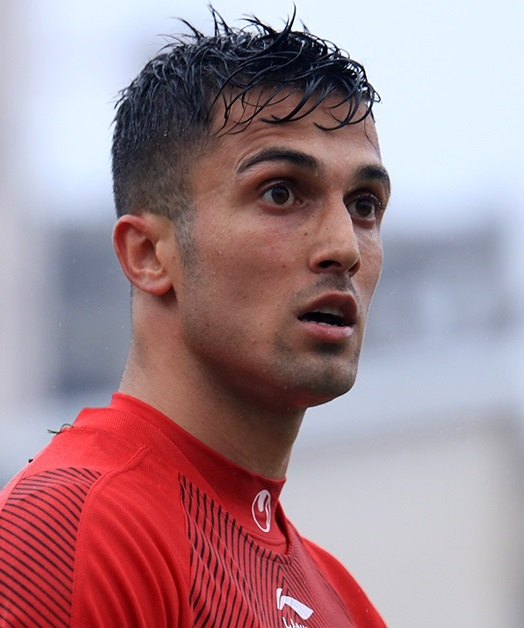

Personal information
- Full name: Sajjad Ashouri meidani
- Date of birth: 16 July 1992 (age 34)
- Place of birth: Qaem Shahr, Iran
- Height: 1.78 m (5 ft 10 in)
- Position: Winger

Team information
- Current team: Paykan
- Number: 90

Youth career
- –2013: Persepolis Qaemshahr

Senior career*
Years	Team	Apps	(Gls)
2013–2014	Nassaji Mazandaran	5	(0)
2014–2016	Parseh Tehran	42	(8)
2016–2017	Paykan	20	(1)
2017–2018	Khooneh be Khooneh	20	(5)
2018–2019	Nassaji Mazandaran	29	(3)
2019–2020	Gol Gohar	19	(1)
2020–2021	Mes Rafsanjan	25	(1)
2021–2022	Naft Masjed Soleyman	2	(0)
2022–2024	Zob Ahan	48	(3)
2024–2025	Tractor	25	(3)
2025–2026	Malavan	3	(0)
2026	Fajr Sepasi	5	(1)
2026–	Paykan	10	(0)
- * Club domestic league appearances and goals as of 18 April 2025

Sajad Ashouri meidani, known as Sajad Ashouri (Persian: سجاد آشوری میدانی; born 16 July 1992) is an Iranian professional footballer who plays as a central midfielder for Persian Gulf Pro League club Paykan.

== Career ==
=== Persepolis ===
He signed a three-years contract with Persepolis on 11 July 2013.

== Career statistics ==
=== Club ===
Club	Season	League			Cup		Continental		Total	
Club	Season	League	Apps	Goals	Apps	Goals	Apps	Goals	Apps	Goals
Nassaji	2013-14	Azadegan League	1	0	0	0	0	0	1	0
Parse	2014-15	Azadegan League	2	0	1	1	0	0	3	1
Parse	2015-16	Azadegan League	28	6	0	0	0	0	28	6
Parse	Total		30	6	1	1	0	0	31	7
Paykan	2016-17	Persian Gulf Pro League	20	1	2	0	0	0	22	1
Paykan	2017-18	Persian Gulf Pro League	2	0	0	0	0	0	2	0
Paykan	Total		22	1	2	0	0	0	24	1
Rayka	2017-18	Azadegan League	20	5	3	0	0	0	23	5
Nassaji	2018-19	Persian Gulf Pro League	29	3	2	0	0	0	31	3
Gol Gohar	2019-20	Persian Gulf Pro League	18	1	1	0	0	0	19	1
Mes Rafsanjan	2020-21	Persian Gulf Pro League	25	1	1	0	0	0	26	1
Naft MIS	2021-22	Persian Gulf Pro League	2	0	0	0	0	0	2	0
Zob Ahan	2021-22	Persian Gulf Pro League	14	0	0	0	0	0	14	0
Zob Ahan	2022-23	Persian Gulf Pro League	21	2	0	0	0	0	21	2
Zob Ahan	2023-24	Persian Gulf Pro League	13	0	0	0	0	0	13	0
Zob Ahan	Total		48	2	0	0	0	0	48	2
Tractor	2023-24	Persian Gulf Pro League	0	0	0	0	0	0	0	0
Career Total			195	19	10	1	0	0	205	20

== Honours ==
Tractor

- Persian Gulf Pro League: 2024–25
