= Ramtin Soleimanzadeh =

Iranian footballer

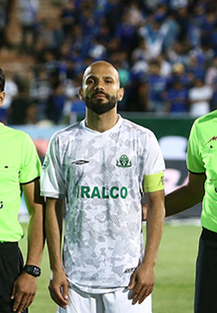
- Soleimanzadeh in 2022

Personal information
- Date of birth: 8 November 1988 (age 38)
- Place of birth: Tehran, Iran
- Height: 1.83 m (6 ft 0 in)
- Position: Centre-back

Team information
- Current team: Zob Ahan Esfahan
- Number: 5

Youth career
- –2012: Saipa

Senior career*
Years	Team	Apps	(Gls)
2012–2014	Esteghlal Khuzestan	21	(0)
2014–2015	Fajr Sepasi	54	(1)
2016	Paykan	17	(0)
2016–2017	Khoneh Be Khoneh	22	(0)
2017–2018	Mes Kerman	23	(1)
2018–2022	Aluminium Arak	114	(0)
2022–2024	Mes Rafsanjan	51	(0)
2024–	Zob Ahan Esfahan	25	(0)
- * Club domestic league appearances and goals as of 11 April 2025

Ramtin Soleimanzadeh (Persian: رامتین سلیمان زاده; born 8 November 1988) is an Iranian footballer who plays for Zob Ahan Esfahan in the Persian Gulf Pro League.
