= Younes Akbarpour =

Iranian football player

Personal information
- Date of birth: 16 March 2002 (age 24)
- Place of birth: Kazerun, Iran
- Height: 1.80 m (5 ft 11 in)
- Positions: Left back; left winger

Team information
- Current team: Aluminium Arak
- Number: 16

Youth career
- –2020: Saipa

Senior career*
Years	Team	Apps	(Gls)
2020–2021	Pars Jonoubi Jam	8	(0)
2021–2022	Mes Rafsanjan	4	(0)
2022–	Aluminium Arak	33	(0)
2024–2026	→ Malavan (loan)	8	(0)

International career^{‡}
2021	Iran U23	2	(0)
- * Club domestic league appearances and goals as of 2 May 2025 ‡ National team caps and goals as of 31 October 2021

Youes Akbarpour (Persian: یونس اکبرپور; born 16 March 2002) is an Iranian footballer who plays for Malavan in the Persian Gulf Pro League.

== Club career ==
In 2019_2020, he started playing professional football in F.C. Pars Jonoubi Jam football team In the 2021 season, he joined Mes Rafsanjan football team and after one season, he joined Aluminum Arak football team and is currently in this team.
