= Milad Badragheh =

Iranian footballer

Personal information
- Date of birth: 17 August 1996 (age 30)
- Place of birth: Omidiyeh, Iran
- Height: 1.83 m (6 ft 0 in)
- Position: Defender

Team information
- Current team: Foolad
- Number: 13

Youth career
- –2016: Foolad

Senior career*
Years	Team	Apps	(Gls)
2016–2022	Foolad	60	(2)
2022–2023	Paykan	37	(1)
2023–2026	Aluminium Arak	59	(1)
2026	Al-Talaba	19	(0)
2026–	Foolad	9	(1)
- * Club domestic league appearances and goals as of 1 November 2024

Milad Badragheh (Persian: میلاد بدرقه, born 17 August 1996) is an Iranian footballer who plays as a Defender for Foolad in the Persian Gulf Pro League.

== Honours ==
=== Club ===
Foolad

- Hazfi Cup: 2020–21
- Iranian Super Cup: 2021
