= Seyed Mehdi Mahdavi =

Iranian footballer

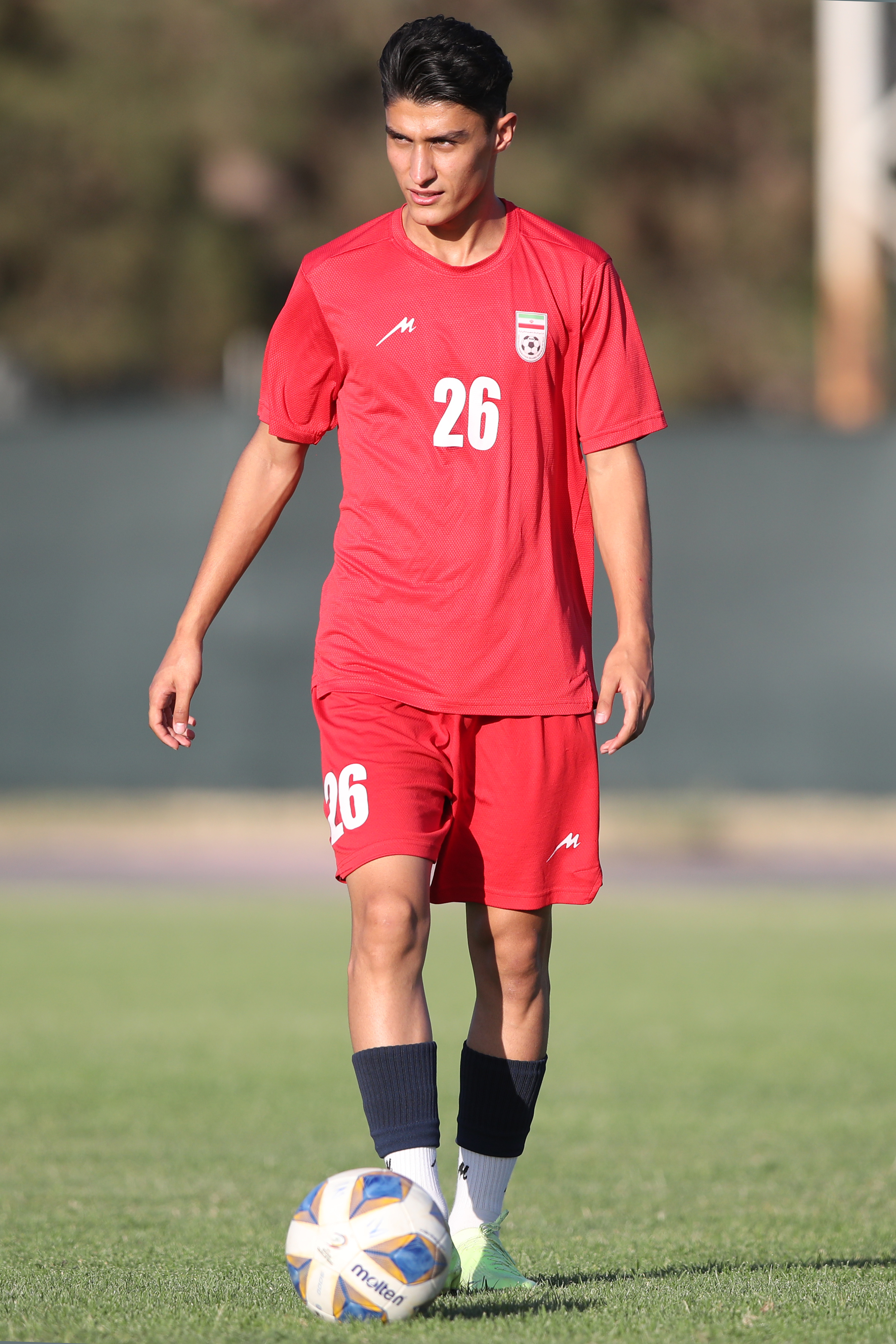
- Mahdavi in the Iranian national team jersey.

Personal information
- Full name: Seyed Mehdi Mahdavi Atashgah
- Date of birth: September 30, 2005 (age 21)
- Place of birth: Tehran, Iran
- Height: 1.82 m (6 ft 0 in)
- Positions: Right-back; right winger

Team information
- Current team: Aluminium Arak
- Number: 13

Youth career
- 2021: Paykan U17
- 2021: Persepolis U17
- 2023: Esteghlal U19
- 2024: Havadar

Senior career*
Years	Team	Apps	(Gls)
2024–2025	Havadar	14	(0)
2025–	Aluminium Arak	30	(1)

International career^{‡}
2024–	Iran U20	3	(0)
2025–	Iran U23	0	(0)
- * Club domestic league appearances and goals as of 11 Jun 2025 ‡ National team caps and goals as of 11 Jun 2025

Seyed Mehdi Mahdavi (born 30 September 2005) is an Iranian professional footballer who plays as a right-back or right winger for Aluminium Arak in the Persian Gulf Pro League. He has also represented the Iran national under-20 football team.

== Club career ==
Mahdavi started his youth career at several notable Iranian clubs including Paykan F.C., Persepolis F.C., Saipa F.C., and Esteghlal F.C.. In July 2024, he joined Havadar S.C., where he made his professional debut in the Persian Gulf Pro League during the 2024–25 season. As of May 2025, he has made 14 league appearances and scored one goal.

== International career ==
Mahdavi made his debut for the Iran U20 national team on 7 July 2024 in a friendly match against Turkmenistan U20. He has earned 3 caps with the U20 team, playing a total of 304 minutes as of May 2025.

=== CAFA U-20 Championship 2024 ===
In July 2024, Mahdavi was called up to Iran's U20 squad for the CAFA U-20 Championship in Kyrgyzstan. He started in the final match, helping Iran defeat the hosts 3–0 and win the title. The team kept a clean sheet throughout the tournament, and it marked Mahdavi’s first major international success at youth level.

=== Iran U23 ===
Mahdavi was invited to the Iran U23 by Ravankhah in August 2025 to participate in the 2026 AFC U-23 Asian Cup qualification.

== Personal life ==
On 16 January 2026, just before their match against South Korea in the AFC U-23 Asian Cup, Mahdavi, along with his entire team, refused to sing "Mehr-e Khavaran", the national anthem of the Islamic Republic of Iran, in solidarity with the 2025–2026 Iranian protests.

== Honours ==
=== International ===
- Iran U20
  - CAFA U-20 Championship: 2024
