= Davoud Haghdoust =

Iranian footballer

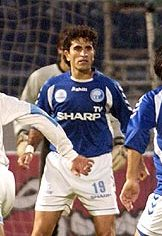

Personal information
- Full name: Davoud Haghdoust
- Date of birth: January 18, 1974 (age 52)
- Place of birth: Iran
- Position: Defender

Senior career*
Years	Team	Apps	(Gls)
- Zob Ahan
- Esteghlal
- Bargh Shiraz

Managerial career
- Tarbiat Yazd
- Kaveh Tehran
- Sh. Bandar Abbas
- Sh. Bandar Anzali
- 2015–2016: Aluminium Hormozgan
- 2016–2017: Kheybar Khorramabad
- * Club domestic league appearances and goals as of 19 March 2018

Davoud Haghdoust (Persian: داود حق دوست, born January 18, 1974) is a retired Iranian football player who played for Esteghlal during the 2006–2007 season. He usually plays as a defender.
