= Ehsan Moradian =

Iranian footballer (born 1994)

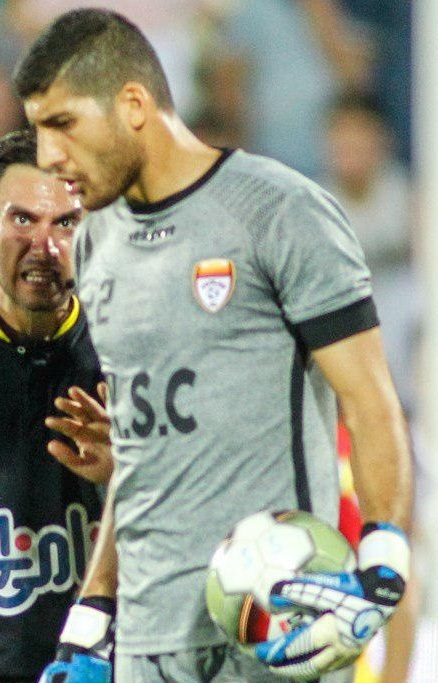

Personal information
- Date of birth: 20 September 1994 (age 32)
- Place of birth: Nurabad, Iran
- Height: 1.90 m (6 ft 3 in)
- Position: Goalkeeper

Team information
- Current team: Kheybar Khorramabad
- Number: 1

Youth career
- –2010: Esteghlal Mamasani
- 2011–2013: Esteghlal Ahvaz
- 2013–2014: Foolad

Senior career*
Years	Team	Apps	(Gls)
2014–2015	Naft Gachsaran	0	(0)
2015–2016	Esteghlal Ahvaz	9	(0)
2016–2022	Foolad	61	(0)
2022-2023	Sanat Naft	9	(0)
2023–2024	Tractor	2	(0)
2024–2026	Aluminium Arak	1	(0)
2026	Pars Jonoubi	19	(0)
2026–	Kheybar Khorramabad	0	(0)
- * Club domestic league appearances and goals as of 1 November 2024

Ehsan Moradian (Persian: احسان مرادیان; born 20 September 1994) is an Iranian football goalkeeper who plays for Kheybar Khorramabad in the Persian Gulf Pro League.

== Club career ==
Moradian joined Esteghlal Ahvaz in summer 2015. He made his professional debut for Esteghlal Ahvaz on January 28, 2015, against Malavan where he used as a starter.

== Club career statistics ==
As of 28 January 2016

Club	Division	Season	League		Hazfi Cup		Asia		Other		Total	
Club	Division	Season	Apps	Goals	Apps	Goals	Apps	Goals	Apps	Goals	Apps	Goals
Naft Gachsaran	Division 11	2014–15	0	0	0	0	–	–	0	0	0	0
Esteghlal Ahvaz	Pro League	2015–16	9	0	0	0	–	–	0	0	9	0
Foolad	Persian Gulf Pro League	2016-17	8	0	0	0	0	0	0	0	8	0
Foolad	Persian Gulf Pro League	2017-18	6	0	0	0	0	0	0	0	6	0
Foolad	Persian Gulf Pro League	2018-19	18	0	0	0	0	0	0	0	18	0
Foolad	Persian Gulf Pro League	2019-20	5	0	1	0	0	0	0	0	6	0
Foolad	Persian Gulf Pro League	2020-21	10	0	4	0	0	0	0	0	14	0
Foolad	Persian Gulf Pro League	2021-22	14	0	0	0	0	0	1	0	15	0
Foolad	Total		61	0	5	0	0	0	1	0	67	0
Sanat	Persian Gulf Pro League	2022-23	9	0	1	0	0	0	0	0	10	0
Tractor	Persian Gulf Pro League	2022-23	2	0	0	0	0	0	0	0	2	0
Tractor	Persian Gulf Pro League	2023-24	0	0	1	0	0	0	0	0	1	0
Tractor	Total		2	0	1	0	0	0	0	0	3	0
Career totals			81	0	7	0	0	0	1	0	89	0

== Honours ==
Foolad

- Hazfi Cup: 2020–21
- Iranian Super Cup: 2021
