= List of Iranian football transfers winter 2022–23 =

The 2022–23 winter transfer window for Iranian football transfers opened on 7 January and closed at midnight on 26 January. Additionally, players without a club could join at any time. This list includes transfers featuring at least one Iran Football League club which were completed after the end of the summer 2022 transfer window on 31 August 2022 and before the end of the 2022–23 winter window.

== Persian Gulf Pro League ==
=== Aluminium ===
In:

No.	Pos.	Nation	Player
—	FW	(Iran) IRN	Mohammad Reza Khalatbari (from Foolad)

Out:

No.	Pos.	Nation	Player
20	DF	(Iran) IRN	Meysam Majidi (Retired)

=== Esteghlal ===
In:

No.	Pos.	Nation	Player

Out:

No.	Pos.	Nation	Player
7	DF	(Iran) IRN	Siavash Yazdani (to Sepahan)

=== Foolad ===
In:

No.	Pos.	Nation	Player
—	MF	(Iran) IRN	Saeed Vasei (from Tractor)
—	MF	(Spain) ESP	Roberto Torres (from (Spain) Osasuna)
—	MF	(Japan) JPN	Yukiya Sugita (from (Sweden) IK Sirius)
—	DF	(Iran) IRN	Mohammad Nejadmehdi (from Sepahan)

Out:

No.	Pos.	Nation	Player
7	FW	(Iran) IRN	Majid Aliyari (Unattached)
10	MF	(South Africa) RSA	Ayanda Patosi (Unattached)
21	DF	(Iran) IRN	Voria Ghafouri (Unattached)
5	DF	(Mali) MLI	Moussa Coulibaly (Unattached)

=== Gol Gohar ===
In:

No.	Pos.	Nation	Player
—	MF	(Iran) IRN	Mohammad Reza Hosseini (On loan from Sepahan)

Out:

No.	Pos.	Nation	Player

=== Havadar ===
In:

No.	Pos.	Nation	Player
—	MF	(Iran) IRN	Masoud Shojaei (from Nassaji)
—	DF	(Iran) IRN	Morteza Mansouri (from Mes Rafsanjan)

Out:

No.	Pos.	Nation	Player
23	MF	(Iran) IRN	Moein Abbasian (to Mes Kerman)
75	DF	(Iran) IRN	Farzad Jafari (to Mes Kerman)

=== Malavan ===
In:

No.	Pos.	Nation	Player

Out:

No.	Pos.	Nation	Player

=== Mes Kerman ===
In:

No.	Pos.	Nation	Player
—	MF	(Iran) IRN	Moein Abbasian (from Havadar)
—	DF	(Iran) IRN	Farzad Jafari (from Havadar)

Out:

No.	Pos.	Nation	Player

=== Mes Rafsanjan ===
In:

No.	Pos.	Nation	Player

Out:

No.	Pos.	Nation	Player
—	DF	(Iran) IRN	Morteza Mansouri (to Havadar)

=== Naft Masjed-Soleyman ===
In:

No.	Pos.	Nation	Player

Out:

No.	Pos.	Nation	Player
7	MF	(Iran) IRN	Saman Nariman Jahan (to Zob Ahan)

=== Nassaji ===
In:

No.	Pos.	Nation	Player
—	DF	(Iran) IRN	Mohammadreza Mehdizadeh (from Free agent)

Out:

No.	Pos.	Nation	Player
77	MF	(Iran) IRN	Masoud Shojaei (to Havadar)

=== Paykan ===
In:

No.	Pos.	Nation	Player
—	GK	(Iran) IRN	Mohammad Rashid Mazaheri (from Sepahan)

Out:

No.	Pos.	Nation	Player

=== Persepolis ===
In:

No.	Pos.	Nation	Player
72	FW	(Iran) IRN	Issa Alekasir (from Free agent)

Out:

No.	Pos.	Nation	Player
4	FW	(Netherlands) NED	Jürgen Locadia (Unattached)
40	FW	(Iran) IRN	Hamed Pakdel (to Tractor)

=== Sanat Naft ===
In:

No.	Pos.	Nation	Player

Out:

No.	Pos.	Nation	Player

=== Sepahan ===
In:

No.	Pos.	Nation	Player
11	MF	(Brazil) BRA	Ygor Catatau (from (Brazil) Sampaio Corrêa)
22	GK	(Iran) IRN	Mohammad Sadegh Salehi ^{U21} (from Sepahan U19)
99	DF	(Iran) IRN	Siavash Yazdani (from Esteghlal)
24	DF	(Iran) IRN	Mohammad Hossein Rouholamin ^{U23} (from Sepahan B)

Out:

No.	Pos.	Nation	Player
1	GK	(Iran) IRN	Mohammad Rashid Mazaheri (to Paykan)
2	DF	(Iran) IRN	Mohammad Nejadmehdi (to Foolad)
3	DF	(Brazil) BRA	Renato Silveira (to (Brazil) Novorizontino)
7	MF	(Iran) IRN	Mohammad Reza Hosseini (On loan to Gol Gohar)
27	MF	(Iran) IRN	Hassan Shoushtari (On loan to Saipa)

=== Tractor ===
In:

No.	Pos.	Nation	Player
—	FW	(Iran) IRN	Hamed Pakdel (from Persepolis)

Out:

No.	Pos.	Nation	Player
93	DF	(Azerbaijan) AZE	Hojjat Haghverdi (Loan return to (Azerbaijan) Sumgayit)
77	MF	(Iran) IRN	Saeed Vasei (to Foolad)

=== Zob Ahan ===
In:

No.	Pos.	Nation	Player
—	MF	(Iran) IRN	Saman Nariman Jahan (from Naft Masjed-Soleyman)

Out:

No.	Pos.	Nation	Player
18	FW	(Serbia) SRB	Darko Bjedov (Unattached)
17	MF	(Tajikistan) TJK	Ehson Panjshanbe (Unattached)
