= Amir Noori =

Iranian footballer

Amir Nouri
Personal information
- Date of birth: 19 June 1996 (age 30)
- Place of birth: Arak, Iran
- Height: 1.77 m (5 ft 10 in)
- Position: Midfielder

Team information
- Current team: Aluminium Arak
- Number: 5

Youth career
- –2014: Rah Ahan
- 2014–2016: Moghavemat Tehran
- 2016–2017: Naft Tehran

Senior career*
Years	Team	Apps	(Gls)
2017–	Aluminium Arak	149	(7)

International career^{‡}
2017–2018	Iran U-17	4	(0)
2022–2023	Iran U-23	5	(0)
- * Club domestic league appearances and goals as of 1 November 2024 ‡ National team caps and goals as of 01:42, 18 October 2023 (UTC)

Amir Nouri (Persian: امیر نوری; born 19 June 1996) is an Iranian footballer who plays as a midfielder for Persian Gulf Pro League side Aluminium Arak.

== International career ==
Nouri played on the Iran national under-17 football team in 2017 and the under-23 team in 2022.

== Career statistics ==
As of 17 October 2023
Club	Season	League		
Club	Season	Division	Apps	Goals
Aluminium Arak	2020-21	Persian Gulf Pro League	3	1
Aluminium Arak	2021-22	Persian Gulf Pro League	27	1
Aluminium Arak	2022-23	Persian Gulf Pro League	11	0
Aluminium Arak	2023-24	Persian Gulf Pro League	3	0
Career total			44	2
