= Mohammad Khalifeh =

Iranian association football player

Personal information
- Date of birth: 19 August 2004 (age 22)
- Place of birth: Marvdasht, Fars, Iran
- Height: 1.94 m (6 ft 4 in)
- Position: Goalkeeper

Team information
- Current team: Aluminium Arak (on loan from Esteghlal)
- Number: 1

Youth career
- 2022–2023: Persepolis

Senior career*
Years	Team	Apps	(Gls)
2023–2026	Aluminium Arak	54	(0)
2026–	Esteghlal	0	(0)
2026–	→ Aluminium Arak (loan)	13	(0)

International career^{‡}
2025–	Iran U-23	3	(0)
2026–	Iran	1	(0)
- * Club domestic league appearances and goals as of 20 February 2026 ‡ National team caps and goals as of 14 November 2026

Mohammad Khalifeh (born 19 August 2004) is an Iranian professional footballer who plays as a goalkeeper for Aluminium Arak in the Persian Gulf Pro League on loan from Esteghlal, and the Iran national team.

== Club career ==
=== Aluminium Arak ===
In August 2024, Khalifeh signed a four-year contract with Aluminium Arak F.C. after joining the club during the summer transfer window.

=== Esteghlal ===
In July 2026, he joined Esteghlal F.C. on a five-year contract during the summer transfer window.

== Career statistics ==
=== Club ===
As of 20 February 2026.

Club	Season	League	Cup	Continental	Other	Total
Aluminium Arak	2023–24	3 (0)	0 (0)	–	–	3 (0)
Aluminium Arak	2024–25	29 (0)	1 (0)	–	–	30 (0)
Aluminium Arak	2025–26	22 (0)	1 (0)	–	–	23 (0)
Total		54 (0)	2 (0)	–	–	56 (0)

=== International ===
As of match played 14 November 2026

Appearances and goals by national team and year
National team	Year	Apps	Goals
Iran
Iran	2026	1	0
Total		1	0

== Honours ==
=== Individual ===
- Named by the International Federation of Football History & Statistics (IFFHS) in the AFC Under-20 Team of the Year for 2024 as the team's goalkeeper.
