= Maysam Aghaei =

Iranian footballer

Personal information
- Date of birth: 22 June 1990 (age 36)
- Place of birth: Arak, Iran
- Height: 1.81 m (5 ft 11 in)
- Position: Midfielder

Team information
- Current team: Aluminium Arak
- Number: 66

Youth career
- 2001–2008: Esteghlal

Senior career*
| Years | Team | Apps | (Gls) |
| 2008–2009 | Hepco | | |
| 2009–2010 | Shensa | | |
| 2010–2012 | Rah Ahan | 14 | (1) |
| 2012–2014 | Aluminium Hormozgan | 15 | (1) |
| 2014–2016 | Aluminium Arak | 23 | (2) |
| 2016–2017 | Pars Jonoubi Jam | 18 | (1) |
| 2017 | Aluminium Arak | 14 | (3) |
| 2017–2018 | Pars Jonoubi Jam | 4 | (0) |
| 2018–2022 | Aluminium Arak | 76 | (4) |
| 2022 | Mes Kerman | 7 | (1) |
| 2022–2023 | Van Pars | 8 | (0) |
| 2023–2024 | Kheybar | 23 | (1) |
| 2024– | Aluminium Arak | 0 | (0) |
- * Club domestic league appearances and goals as of 2 May 2025

Maysam Aghaei (Persian: میثم آقایی; born 22 June 1990) is an Iranian footballer who plays for Aluminium Arak in the Persian Gulf Pro League. His twin brother Sajjad is also a footballer.

== Professional ==
Aghaei played for Shensa before joining Rah Ahan.

=== Club Career Statistics ===
Last Update 10 May 2013

| Club performance | | | League | | Cup | | Continental | | Total | |
| Season | Club | League | Apps | Goals | Apps | Goals | Apps | Goals | Apps | Goals |
| Iran | | | League | | Hazfi Cup | | Asia | | Total | |
|---|---|---|---|---|---|---|---|---|---|---|
| 2009–10 | Shensa | Division 1 | | 6 | | | – | – | | |
| 2010–11 | Rah Ahan | Iran Pro League | 5 | 0 | 0 | 0 | – | – | 5 | 0 |
| Total | Iran | | | 6 | | | 0 | 0 | | |
| Career total | | | | 6 | | | 0 | 0 | | |

- Assist Goals

| Season | Team | Assists |
|---|---|---|
| 10–11 | Rah Ahan | 0 |
