= Mehdi Hosseini (footballer) =

Iranian footballer

Personal information
- Full name: Seyed Mehdi Hosseini
- Date of birth: 16 September 1993 (age 33)
- Place of birth: Qom, Iran
- Height: 1.72 m (5 ft 8 in)
- Position: Central midfielder

Team information
- Current team: Tractor
- Number: 6

Youth career
- 2012–2013: Saba

Senior career*
Years	Team	Apps	(Gls)
2013–2017	Saba	40	(1)
2017–2018	Gol Reyhan	25	(1)
2018–2021	Aluminium Arak	80	(6)
2021–	Mes Rafsanjan	28	(2)
2023–	Tractor	42	(4)
- * Club domestic league appearances and goals as of 1 August 2025

Mehdi Hosseini (Persian: مهدی حسینی; born 16 September 1993) is an Iranian professional footballer who plays as a central midfielder for Persian Gulf Pro League club Tractor.

== Club career ==
=== Saba ===
Hosseini promoted to Saba first team in summer 2013 by Mohammad Mayeli Kohan. He made 10 appearances until fixture 13 but suspend after that for 2 years due Doping issues. He joined Saba again in summer 2015. He played against Saipa on 27 October, 2015 4 days after end of his suspension while he used a substitute for Saman Aghazamani.

== Career statistics ==
As of 16 April 2022

Club	Season	League			Hazfi Cup		Continental		Total	
Club	Season	Division	Apps	Goals	Apps	Goals	Apps	Goals	Apps	Goals
Saba	2013–14	Persian Gulf Pro League	10	0	0	0	0	0	10	0
Saba	2015–16	Persian Gulf Pro League	4	0	0	0	0	0	4	0
Saba	2016–17	Persian Gulf Pro League	26	1	1	0	0	0	27	1
Saba	Total		40	1	1	0	0	0	41	1
Gol Reyhan	2017–18	Azadegan League	25	1	2	0	0	0	27	1
Aluminium Arak	2018–19	Azadegan League	23	1	0	0	0	0	23	1
Aluminium Arak	2019–20	Azadegan League	29	0	0	0	0	0	29	0
Aluminium Arak	2020–21	Persian Gulf Pro League	28	5	3	0	0	0	31	5
Aluminium Arak	Total		80	6	3	0	0	0	83	6
Mes Rafsanjan	2021–22	Persian Gulf Pro League	28	2	3	0	0	0	31	2
Mes Rafsanjan	2022-23	Persian Gulf Pro League	30	1	2	0	0	0	32	1
Mes Rafsanjan	Total		58	3	5	0	0	0	63	3
Tractor	2023-24	Persian Gulf Pro League	28	3	3	0	1	0	32	3
Tractor	2024-25	Persian Gulf Pro League	14	1	0	0	2	0	16	1
Tractor	Total		42	4	3	0	3	0	48	4
Career total			245	15	14	0	3	0	262	15

== Honours ==
Tractor

- Persian Gulf Pro League: 2024–25
- Iranian Super Cup: 2025
