= Iranian Aluminium Company =

Aluminum manufacturer located in Arak

- Company type: Public
- Traded as: TSE: ALIR1; ISIN: IRO1ALIR0006
- Industry: Metals
- Founded: (1967; 59 years ago)
- Headquarters: Arak, Iran
- Area served: Worldwide
- Key people: Dr.Miri Lavasani, Mohsen Mohammadi, Mostafa Rezaee
- Products: Aluminium; Alumina; Aluminium alloys
- Number of employees: 5000
- Website: en.iralco.ir

Iranian Aluminium Company (IRALCO) is an Iranian aluminum manufacturer located in Arak. It is the largest producer of aluminum in Iran. Its plant covers 232 hectares (570 acres) and has an annual production capacity of 190,000 tonnes (210,000 short tons) per year, consisting of different pure ingots in the shapes of T-bar, casting alloys, billets with different size, slab, and electrical conductors. About 11,000 fabrication plants and workshops with more than 250,000 personnel are working in industries affiliated to aluminum.

IRALCO is a member of the London Metal Exchange and listed on the Tehran Stock Exchange.

== See also ==
- Mining in Iran
