= Sasan Hosseini =

Iranian footballer

Personal information
- Date of birth: 1 January 1999 (age 27)
- Place of birth: Ardabil, Iran
- Height: 1.82 m (6 ft 0 in)
- Position: Forward

Team information
- Current team: Aluminium Arak
- Number: 17

Youth career
- –2019: Pars Jam

Senior career*
| Years | Team | Apps | (Gls) |
| 2019–2020 | Pars Jam | 2 | (0) |
| 2020–2021 | Naft Masjed Soleyman | 29 | (8) |
| 2021 | Aluminium Arak | 1 | (0) |
| 2021–2022 | Foolad | 15 | (1) |
| 2022–2023 | Paykan | 28 | (1) |
| 2023–2024 | Mes Shahr-e Babak | 12 | (3) |
| 2024 | Sanat Naft | 4 | (0) |
| 2025– | Aluminium Arak | 22 | (4) |
- * Club domestic league appearances and goals as of 2 May 2025

Sasan Hosseini (Persian: ساسان حسینی; born 1 January 1999) is an Iranian footballer who plays as a forward for Aluminium Arak in the Persian Gulf Pro League.

== Honours ==
Foolad

- Iranian Super Cup: 2021
