= Mehdi Shabani =

Mehdi Shabani (born 1975) is an Iranian film director. His credits include Shesh-Besh: How I learned to stop worrying and play backgammon (Turkey, 2013), a feature documentary about backgammon aired on VOA (Voice of America); The Bathhouse that wanted to keep on being a bathhouse (Iran, 2009–2010), aired on BBC; and Emigration: An Unfinished Life (Iran, Turkey, 2011–2013). He has published a collection of poems, prepared and presented radio programs in several Persian-language radio stations, as well as a series of articles about the arts, history and politics in Iranian and Persian newspapers.

His last movie, Meyhane, A Home For My Grandfather, was selected in some festivals including the Ankara International Film Festival and the Istanbul Documentarist Film Festival.

== See also ==
- Iranian Cinema
