= Hossein Pour Hamidi =

Iranian association football player

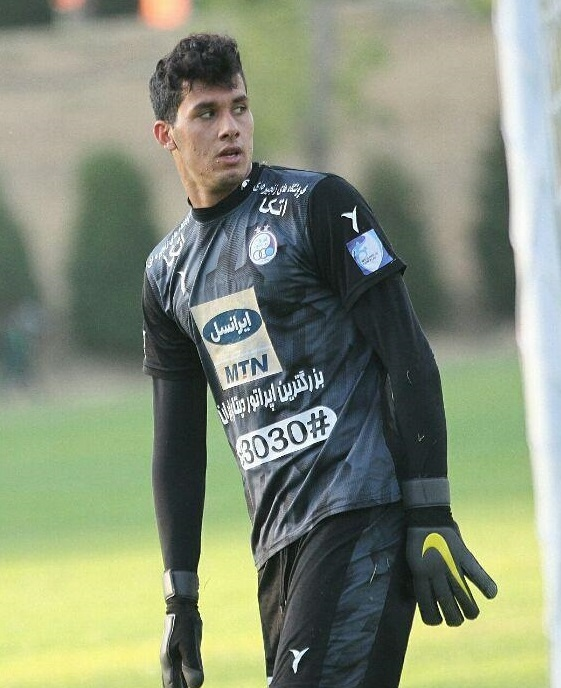

Personal information
- Full name: Hossein Pour Hamidi
- Date of birth: March 26, 1998 (age 28)
- Place of birth: Shoushtar, Iran
- Height: 1.86 m (6 ft 1 in)
- Position: Goalkeeper

Team information
- Current team: Paykan
- Number: 1

Youth career
- 2016–2018: Esteghlal Khuzestan

Senior career*
Years	Team	Apps	(Gls)
2018–2019	Esteghlal Khuzestan	16	(0)
2019–2021	Esteghlal	0	(0)
2020–2021	→ Aluminium Arak (loan)	27	(0)
2021–2025	Tractor	30	(0)
2021–2023	→ Aluminium Arak (loan)	59	(0)
2025–2026	Kheybar Khorramabad	11	(0)
2026–	Paykan	12	(0)

International career^{‡}
2023–	Iran	1	(0)
Medal record
Representing Iran
CAFA Nations Cup
Winner	2023 Kyrgyzstan – Uzbekistan	Team
- * Club domestic league appearances and goals as of 1 June 2024 ‡ National team caps and goals as of 13 June 2023

Hossein Pour Hamidi (Persian: حسین پورحمیدی; born March 26, 1998) is an Iranian footballer who plays as a goalkeeper for Persian Gulf Pro League club Paykan and the Iran national team.

== Career statistics ==
As of 1 June 2024

=== Club ===
Club	Season	League			Cup		Continental		Total	
Club	Season	League	Apps	Goals	Apps	Goals	Apps	Goals	Apps	Goals
Esteghlal Khuzestan	2018–19	Persian Gulf Pro League	16	0	0	0	0	0	16	0
Aluminium	2020–21	Persian Gulf Pro League	27	0	3	0	0	0	30	0
Aluminium	2021–22	Persian Gulf Pro League	29	0	4	0	0	0	33	0
Aluminium	2022–23	Persian Gulf Pro League	30	0	1	0	0	0	31	0
Aluminium	Total		86	0	8	0	0	0	94	0
Tractor	2023–24	Persian Gulf Pro League	30	0	2	0	1	0	33	0
Career Total			132	0	10	0	1	0	143	0

== Club career ==
=== Esteghlal Khuzestan ===
He made his debut for Esteghlal Khuzestan in first fixtures of 2018–19 Iran Pro League against Machine Sazi.

== National Team Career ==
He made his debut against Afghanistan on 13 June 2023.

== Honours ==
=== Club ===
Esteghlal Khuzestan

- Persian Gulf Pro League (1) : 2015–16

Tractor

- Persian Gulf Pro League: 2024–25
