= Sajjad Danaei =

Iranian football player

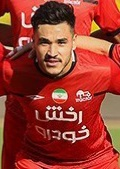

Personal information
- Full name: Sajjad Danaei Baghaki
- Date of birth: 3 October 1996 (age 30)
- Place of birth: Mashhad, Iran
- Height: 1.76 m (5 ft 9 in)
- Positions: Full-back; right midfielder

Team information
- Current team: Kheybar Khorramabad
- Number: 22

Youth career
- –2015: Payam Toos

Senior career*
| Years | Team | Apps | (Gls) |
| 2015–2016 | Payam Toos | | |
| 2016–2017 | Aboomoslem | | |
| 2017–2018 | Siah Jamegan | 11 | (0) |
| 2018–2019 | Fajr Sepasi | 2 | (0) |
| 2019–2021 | Havadar | 49 | (5) |
| 2021–2022 | Zob Ahan | 24 | (1) |
| 2022–2023 | Tractor | 8 | (0) |
| 2023–2024 | Kheybar Khorramabad | 25 | (3) |
| 2024–2026 | Esteghlal Khuzestan | 33 | (0) |
| 2026– | Kheybar Khorramabad | 5 | (0) |
- * Club domestic league appearances and goals as of 1 May 2025

Sajjad Danaei Baghaki (Persian: سجاد دانایی باغکی; born 3 October 1996) is an Iranian football player who plays as a right-back for Persian Gulf Pro League club Kheybar Khorramabad. He also has the ability to play as a right midfielder.

== Club career ==
=== Zob Ahan ===
He joined Zob Ahan on 21 August 2021 with a contract.

== Honours ==
Havadar

- Azadegan League Runner-up (1): 2020–21
