= Pouria Aria Kia =

Iranian footballer

Personal information
- Date of birth: 3 May 1990 (age 36)
- Place of birth: Karaj, Iran
- Height: 1.77 m (5 ft 10 in)
- Position: Left back

Team information
- Current team: Zob Ahan
- Number: 16

Youth career
- 2010: Javid Karaj

Senior career*
Years	Team	Apps	(Gls)
2012–2013	Garand Bojnord		
2013–2014	Alvand Hamedan	13	(0)
2015–2017	Bargh Jadid	17	(5)
2017–2018	Paykan	5	(0)
2018–2019	Aluminium Arak	16	(0)
2019–2020	Pars Jonoubi	29	(3)
2020–2022	Aluminium Arak	59	(1)
2022–2023	Tractor	11	(0)
2023–	Zob Ahan	15	(0)
- * Club domestic league appearances and goals as of 1 February 2025

Pouria Aria Kia (Persian: پوریا آریا کیا, born 3 May 1990) is an Iranian footballer who plays for Zob Ahan in the Persian Gulf Pro League.
