= Amir Mohammad Houshmand =

Iranian footballer

Personal information
- Date of birth: 8 May 2000 (age 26)
- Place of birth: Karaj, Iran
- Height: 1.85 m (6 ft 1 in)
- Position: Defender

Team information
- Current team: Aluminium Arak
- Number: 4

Youth career
- –2020: Saipa

Senior career*
Years	Team	Apps	(Gls)
2020-2023	Aluminium Arak	70	(1)
2023–2025	Nassaji Mazandaran	48	(3)
2025–	Aluminium Arak	29	(0)
- * Club domestic league appearances and goals as of 17 April 2025

Amir Mohammad Houshmand (Persian: امیرمحمد هوشمند; born 8 May 2000) is an Iranian footballer who plays as a defender for Persian Gulf Pro League side Aluminium Arak.
