= Mahmoud Ghaed Rahmati =

Iranian footballer (born 1991)

Personal information
- Date of birth: 6 December 1991 (age 34)
- Place of birth: Dorud, Iran
- Height: 1.83 m (6 ft 0 in)
- Position: Defensive midfielder

Team information
- Current team: Zob Ahan Esfahan
- Number: 99

Youth career
- 2008–2011: Gahar Dorud

Senior career*
Years	Team	Apps	(Gls)
2011–2013	Gahar Dorud		
2013–2015	Ostandari Kermanshah	31	(23)
2015–2016	Kheybar Khorramabad	36	(10)
2016–2018	Sepahan	16	(0)
2018	Naft Masjed Soleyman	9	(0)
2019–2020	Aluminium Arak	19	(1)
2020–2021	Nassaji	24	(2)
2021–2023	Aluminium Arak	74	(6)
2023–2025	Nassaji Mazandaran	24	(0)
2025–	Zob Ahan Esfahan	27	(4)

International career
2012–2013	Iran U20	4	(0)
- * Club domestic league appearances and goals as of 11 April 2025

Mahmoud Ghaed Rahmati (born 6 December 1991) is an Iranian professional footballer who plays as a defensive midfielder for Zob Ahan Esfahan in the Persian Gulf Pro League.
