= Hamed Pakdel =

Iranian professional footballer

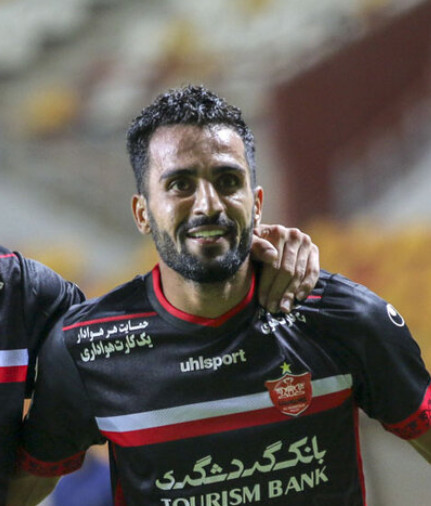
- Pakdel with Persepolis in 2021

Personal information
- Date of birth: 31 October 1991 (age 35)
- Place of birth: Dorud, Iran
- Height: 1.76 m (5 ft 9 in)
- Position: Forward

Team information
- Current team: Nassaji
- Number: 19

Youth career
- –2013: Parseh Tehran

Senior career*
Years	Team	Apps	(Gls)
2013–2014	Parseh Tehran	0	(0)
2014	Paykan	0	(0)
2014–2015	Hafari Ahvaz	0	(0)
2015–2018	Machine Sazi	54	(11)
2018–2019	Sanat Naft Abadan	17	(4)
2019–2020	Pars Jonoubi	9	(2)
2020–2021	Aluminium Arak	26	(10)
2021–2023	Persepolis	25	(5)
2023	Tractor	10	(0)
2023–2024	Paykan	29	(7)
2024–	Nassaji	26	(3)
- * Club domestic league appearances and goals as of 17 April 2025

Hamed Pakdel (Persian: حامد پاکدل; born 31 October 1991) is an Iranian footballer who plays as a forward for Nasaji of the Persian Gulf Pro League.

== Club career ==
=== Aluminium Arak ===
He had a successful era in Aluminium Arak F.C. and was one of the key players of the team. His good performance in the Iranian League attracted the attention of many teams.

=== Persepolis ===
On 29 August 2021, Pakdel signed a two-year contract with Persian Gulf Pro League champions Persepolis.

== Career statistics ==
As of 5 January 2023

Club	Division	Season	League		Hazfi Cup		Asia		Other		Total	
Club	Division	Season	Apps	Goals	Apps	Goals	Apps	Goals	Apps	Goals	Apps	Goals
Parseh Tehran	Azadegan League	2013–14	Unknown		Unknown		—		_		Unknown	
Paykan	Pro League	2014	Unknown		Unknown		—		_		Unknown	
Hafari Ahvaz	2nd Division	2014–15	Unknown		Unknown		—		_		Unknown	
Total			Unknown		Unknown		—		_		Unknown	
Machine Sazi	Azadegan League	2015–16	28	9	2	0	—		_		30	9
Machine Sazi	Pro League	2016–17	17	2	1	0	—		_		18	2
Machine Sazi	Azadegan League	2017–18	8	0	0	0	—		_		8	0
Machine Sazi	Total		53	11	3	0	—		_		56	11
Sanat Naft	Pro League	2018–19	16	4	2	0	—		_		18	4
Pars Jonoubi	Pro League	2019–20	6	0	0	0	—		_		6	0
Aluminium Arak	Pro League	2020–21	26	10	2	0	—		_		28	10
Total			48	14	4	0	—		_		52	14
Persepolis	Pro League	2021–22	17	5	1	0	2	0	1	0	21	5
Persepolis	Pro League	2022–23	8	0	0	0	—		—		8	0
Persepolis	Total		25	5	1	0	2	0	1	0	29	5
Tractor	Persian Gulf Pro League	2022-23	10	0	0	0	0	0	0	0	10	0
Paykan	Persian Gulf Pro League	2023-24	20	4	1	0	0	0	0	0	21	4
Career totals			156	34	8	0	2	0	1	0	167	34

== Honours ==
=== Aluminium Arak ===
- Azadegan League: Runner-up (1): 2019–20

=== Persepolis ===
- Iranian Super Cup: Runner-up (1): 2021
