= Aluminium Arak F.C. =

Iranian football club

Aluminium Arak
- Full name: Aluminium Arak Football club
- Nicknames: Artesh-e Amir Kâbir (Amir Kabir's army); Mardan-e Âftab (The men of the sun)
- Founded: 2001; 25 years ago as PAS Arak Football Club
- Ground: Imam Khomeini
- Capacity: 15,000
- Owner: IRALCO
- Chairman: Mohammad Rajaeian
- Head Coach: Pirouz Ghorbani
- League: Persian Gulf Pro League
- 2025–26: Persian Gulf Pro League, 14th of 16
- Website: http://fciralco.ir/
| Home colours | Away colours | Third colours |

Aluminium Arak Football Club (Persian: باشگاه فوتبال آلومینیوم اراک, Bashgah-e Futbal-e Aluminium Arak), commonly known as Aluminium Arak, is an Iranian football club based in Arak, Markazi, that competes in the Persian Gulf Pro League. The club was founded as PAS Arak Football Club in 2001. The club is part of Aluminium Arak Sport and Cultural Club.

The football team plays their home games at the Imam Khomeini Stadium which has a seating capacity of 15,000. The club is owned and supported by the IRALCO (Iranian Aluminium Company).

== History ==
=== Establishment ===
The club was founded as PAS Arak Football Club in 2001. They played their first year in Azadegan League and were relegated at the end of the season.

=== Sanaye Arak ===
In 2002 the club changed their name to Sanaye Arak Football Club. Although they did not participate in 2002–03 Iran 2nd Division they were able to play next season in Azadegan League. Sanaye Arak played six years in Azadegan League. Prior to the start of the 2007–08 season, Sanaye Arak moved from their old stadium to the new Imam Khomeini Stadium, which the club shares today with Shahrdari Arak. In 2008 Sanaye Arak was bought by the Iranian Aluminium Company (IRALCO).

=== Difficult years ===
Due to financial problems, Sanaye Arak was bought by the Iranian Aluminium Company (IRALCO) in 2008. They changed the name to Aluminium Arak Football Club. They finished fourth in that season. Only one year later Aluminium Arak terminated their sports activities due to financial problems.

After Aluminium Arak terminated their sports activities, Shensa took over the club. The club was known as Shensa Arak Football Club in 2009–10 Azadegan League. They finished 11th in that season.

Only one year later again, Hamyari Arak took over Shensa and named the club Hamyari Arak Football Club. They finished 11th in the 2010–11 Azadegan League season.

=== Shahrdari Arak ===
In 2011 Municipality of Arak took over the club and named it Shahrdari Arak Football Club. After relegated at the end of the 2012–13 Azadegan League season, Shahrdari Arak finished 13th in 2013–14 Iran 2nd Division. Although the Iranian Aluminium Company (IRALCO) bought the club again in 2014, Shahrdari Arak were able to play in the 2015–16 League 3 season as an own club.

=== Aluminium Arak ===
In summer 2014 the Iranian Aluminium Company (IRALCO) bought the club again. They finished first in 2014–15 League 2 and comes back to Azadegan League. They finished ninth in the 2015–16 Azadegan League season.

Aluminum impressed in the 2016–17 Hazfi Cup, as they defeated Persian Gulf Pro League side Paykan 1–0, before losing to five time Persian Gulf Pro League champions Sepahan. They finished the 2016–17 Azadegan League season on place nine.

== Name history ==
- PAS Arak Football Club (2001–2002)
- Sanaye Arak Football Club (2002–2008)
- Aluminium Arak Football Club (2008–2009)
- Shensa Arak Football Club (2009–2010)
- Hamyari Arak Football Club (2010–2011)
- Shahrdari Arak Football Club (2011–2014)
- Aluminium Arak Football Club (2014–present)

== Crest ==
Shensa Arak from 2009 to 2010

Hamyari Arak from 2010 to 2011

Aluminium Arak from 2014 to 2019

Aluminium Arak since 2019

== Stadium ==
Aluminium Arak plays their home games at the Imam Khomeini Stadium which has a seating capacity of 15,000. The stadium was opened in 2007 and is owned by the Iran Physical Education Organization. It is also the home venue of local rival Shahrdari Arak.

== Seasons ==
The table below chronicles the achievements of Aluminium Arak in various competitions since 2001.

| Season | Division | League | Position | Hazfi Cup | Notes |
|---|---|---|---|---|---|
| 2001–02 | 2 | Azadegan League | 9th (Group B) | Not qualified | Relegated |
| 2002–03 | 3 | League 2 | Did not enter | Not qualified | Promoted |
| 2003–04 | 2 | Azadegan League | 14th | Not qualified |
| 2004–05 | 2 | Azadegan League | 7th | Quarter-final |
| 2005–06 | 2 | Azadegan League | 5th (Group A) | Did not enter |
| 2006–07 | 2 | Azadegan League | 8th (Group B) | Round of 32 |
| 2007–08 | 2 | Azadegan League | 10th (Group B) | Round of 16 |
| 2008–09 | 2 | Azadegan League | 4th (Group A) | 2nd round |
| 2009–10 | 2 | Azadegan League | 11th (Group B) | 3rd round |
| 2010–11 | 2 | Azadegan League | 10th (Group A) | 3rd round |
| 2011–12 | 2 | Azadegan League | 4th (Group A) | Round of 32 |
| 2012–13 | 2 | Azadegan League | 13th (Group A) | Did not enter | Relegated |
| 2013–14 | 3 | League 2 | 13th (Group B) | 4th round |
| 2014–15 | 3 | League 2 | 1st (Group A) | Did not enter | Promoted |
| 2015–16 | 2 | Azadegan League | 9th | Did not enter |
| 2016–17 | 2 | Azadegan League | 9th | Round of 16 |
| 2017–18 | 2 | Azadegan League | 13th | 2nd Round |
| 2018–19 | 2 | Azadegan League | 4th | 2nd Round |
| 2019–20 | 2 | Azadegan League | 2nd | 2nd Round | Promoted |
| 2020–21 | 1 | Persian Gulf Pro League | 11th | Quarter Finals |

Notes:
The Persian Gulf Pro League was formerly known as Iran Pro League (IPL) and Persian Gulf Cup (PGC)
The Azadegan League was the highest division between 1991 and 2001
The League 2 was formerly known as Iran 2nd Division
The League 3 was formerly known as Iran 3rd Division

== Honours ==
=== Domestic ===
- Azadegan League
  - Runners-up (1): 2019–20
- League 2
  - Champions (1): 2014–15

== Players ==
=== First team squad ===
As of 15 August 2026

Note: Flags indicate national team as defined under FIFA eligibility rules; some limited exceptions apply. Players may hold more than one non-FIFA nationality.

| No. | Pos. | Nation | Player |
|---|---|---|---|
| 1 | GK | IRN | Mohammad Khalifeh ^{U23} (on loan from Esteghlal) |
| 2 | DF | IRN | Bahram Goudarzi ^{U21} (on loan from Esteghlal) |
| 3 | DF | IRN | Abolfazl Sokhtanlou ^{U21} |
| 4 | DF | IRN | Amir Mohammad Houshmand |
| 5 | MF | IRN | Amir Noori (Captain) |
| 6 | MF | IRN | Mahmoud Motlaghzadeh |
| 7 | MF | IRN | Amirali Sadeghi |
| 8 | MF | IRN | Abolfazl Ghanbari ^{U23} |
| 9 | FW | IRN | Shervin Bozorg |
| 10 | FW | IRN | Reza Jabireh |
| 11 | DF | IRN | Ali Vatandoust ^{U25} |
| 12 | GK | IRN | Mehdi Tayefeh ^{U23} |
| 13 | DF | IRN | Seyed Mehdi Mahdavi ^{U21} |
| 15 | DF | IRN | Mehran Mousavi |
| 16 | DF | IRN | Younes Akbarpour ^{U25} |
| 17 | FW | IRN | Sasan Hosseini |

| No. | Pos. | Nation | Player |
|---|---|---|---|
| 19 | DF | IRN | Ali Rezaei ^{U23} |
| 20 | DF | IRN | Sina Shahabbasi |
| 21 | MF | IRN | Saeid Sadeghi |
| 22 | GK | IRN | Amir Hossein Amini ^{U21} |
| 23 | FW | IRN | Erfan Khodadadian ^{U19} |
| 25 | MF | IRN | Omid Gharechomaghlou ^{U19} |
| 27 | MF | IRN | Ali Latifi ^{U19} |
| 33 | DF | IRN | Taha Mohebipour ^{U23} |
| 44 | DF | IRN | Sasan Jafarikia |
| 57 | MF | IRN | Mehdi Khodayari ^{U23} |
| 60 | MF | IRN | Samir Hoboobati ^{U21} |
| 66 | MF | IRN | Sobhan Kamalvand ^{U23} |
| 70 | MF | IRN | Hamed Bahiraei |
| 77 | MF | IRN | Reza Zolfipour |
| 80 | MF | IRN | Abbas Kahrizi ^{U23} |
| 99 | MF | IRN | Amir Hossein Amanipour ^{U19} |

=== Reserve Squad ===
Note: Flags indicate national team as defined under FIFA eligibility rules; some limited exceptions apply. Players may hold more than one non-FIFA nationality.

| No. / Pos. / Nation / Player | No. / Pos. / Nation / Player |

=== Out on loan ===
Note: Flags indicate national team as defined under FIFA eligibility rules; some limited exceptions apply. Players may hold more than one non-FIFA nationality.

| No. | Pos. | Nation | Player |
|---|---|---|---|
| — | FW | IRN | Reza Marzban ^{U21} (at Malavan) |

== Coaches ==
=== Coaches since 2002 ===
| No. | Coach | from | until |
|---|---|---|---|
| 1 | (Iran) Ali Rashidi | July 2001 | June 2003 |
| 2 | (Iran) Nasrollah Abdollahi | July 2003 | Jan 2004 |
| 3 | (Iran) Hossein Kazerani | Jan 2004 | mar 2004 |
| 4 | (Iran) Ali Rashidi | mar 2004 | June 2004 |
| 5 | (Iran) Mansour Pourheidari | July 2004 | June 2005 |
| 6 | (Iran) Hossein Abangah | July 2005 | dec 2005 |
| 7 | (Iran) Mansour Pourheidari | dec 2005 | June 2007 |
| 8 | (Iran) Faraz Kamalvand | July 2007 | March 2008 |
| 9 | (Iran) Naser Ebrahimi | March 2008 | June 2008 |
| 10 | (Iran) Javad Zarincheh | July 2008 | June 2009 |
| 11 | (Brazil) Castro Flore | September 2009 | October 2009 |
| 12 | (Brazil) Savio Sousa | October 2009 | Jan 2010 |
| 13 | (Iran) Mansour Pourheidari | Jan 2010 | June 2010 |
| 14 | (Iran) Yaghoub Vatani | July 2010 | June 2011 |
| 15 | (Iran) Nader Dastneshan | July 2011 | June 2012 |
| 16 | (Iran) Ali Hanteh | July 2012 | September 2012 |
| 17 | (Iran) Hamid Jafari | September 2012 | November 2012 |
| 18 | (Iran) Abolfazl Ghadamian | November 2012 | January 2013 |
| 19 | (Iran) Ahmad Chahi | November 2012 | January 2013 |
| 20 | (Iran) Farshad Fallahatzadeh | January 2013 | February 2013 |
| 21 | (Iran) Mohammad Navazi | February 2013 | March 2013 |
| 22 | (Iran) Asghar Sharafi | March 2013 | April 2013 |
| 23 | (Iran) Ali Rashidi | April 2013 | June 2013 |
| 23 | (Iran) Ali Nikbakht | June 2013 | September 2014 |
| 24 | (Iran) Mehdi Pashazadeh | September 2014 | June 2015 |
| 25 | (Iran) Gholamreza Delgarm | July 2015 | January 2016 |
| 26 | (Iran) Davoud Mahabadi | January 2016 | January 2017 |
| 27 | (Iran) Mehdi Pashazadeh | January 2017 | June 2017 |
| 28 | (Iran) Hamed Basiri | July 2017 | July 2018 |
| 29 | (Iran) Mohammad Rabiei | July 2018 | November 2018 |
| 30 | (Iran) Faraz Kamalvand | November 2018 | April 2019 |
| 31 | (Iran) Mahmoud Fekri | April 2019 | December 2019 |
| 32 | (Iran) Rasoul Khatibi | January 2020 | |

== Individual Records ==
=== All Top Appearances ===
| # | Name | Nationality | Apps |
|---|---|---|---|
| 1 | Ramtin Soleimanzadeh | Iran | 115 |
| 1 | Maysam Aghaei | Iran | 115 |
| 3 | Amir Noori | Iran | 104 |
| 4 | Hossein Pour Hamidi | Iran | 94 |
| 5 | Esmaeil Sharifat | Iran | 90 |
| 6 | Mehdi Hosseini | Iran | 83 |
| 7 | Pouria Aria Kia | Iran | 82 |
| 8 | Mahmoud Ghaed Rahmati | Iran | 75 |
| 8 | Alireza Naghizadeh | Iran | 75 |
| 10 | Amir Mohammad Houshmand | Iran | 74 |

=== All Top Scorers ===
| # | Name | Nationality | Goals |
|---|---|---|---|
| 1 | Rouhollah Arab | Iran | 13 |
| 2 | Mohammad Reza Azadi | Iran | 11 |
| 3 | Hamed Pakdel | Iran | 10 |
| 3 | Meysam Majidi | Iran | 10 |
| 5 | Maysam Aghaei | Iran | 9 |
| 6 | Milad Ahmadi | Iran | 8 |
| 7 | Iman Basafa | Iran | 7 |
| 8 | Amir Noori | Iran | 6 |
| 8 | Mehdi Hosseini | Iran | 6 |
| 8 | Mahmoud Ghaed Rahmati | Iran | 6 |

== See also ==
- Azadegan League
