= 2022–23 F.C. Nassaji Mazandaran season =

Nassaji
2022–23 season
- Owner: (Iran) Reza Haddadian
- Chairman: (Iran) Izad Seifullahpour
- Manager: (Iran) Esmaeil Esmaeili (interim, from 11 May, until 19 June) (Iran) Hamid Motahari (from 19 June)
- Stadium: Vatani Stadium
- Persian Gulf Pro League: 13th
- Hazfi Cup: Semi Final
- Super Cup: Final
- Top goalscorer: League: — All: —
- All statistics correct as of 3 June 2022.

The 2022–23 season is the 5th season of F.C. Nassaji in the Iranian Football Pro League. In addition to the domestic league, Nassaji also competes in this season's Hazfi Cup and Super Cup.

== Kits ==
| Home | Away | Third |

== Season overview ==
June

On June 20, Hamid Motahari, the former assistant coach of Persepolis club, officially became the head coach of the Nassaji.

== Coaching and Management staff ==
=== Technical Staff ===
As of 29 May 2022

| Pos. | Name |
|---|---|
| Head coach | (Iran) Esmaeil Esmaeili |
| Assistant coach | (Iran) Ali Shaykhol Eslami |
| Assistant coach | (Iran) Ali Janmaleki |
| Assistant coach | (Iran) Shahrokh Bayani |
| Assistant coach | (Iran) Adel Babapour |
| Goalkeeper coach | (Armenia) Harutyun Abrahamyan |
| Fitness coach | (Iran) Hamid Hasanzadeh |
| Analyzer | (Iran) Sadegh Moghadam |
| Doctor | — |
| Physiotherapist | — |
| Administrator | (Iran) Ali Esmaeilzadeh |
| Media Manager | — |

=== Management chart ===
As of 19 Dec 2019

| Name | Pos. |
|---|---|
| (Iran) Reza Haddadian | Owner |
| (Iran) Izad Saifullahpour | Chairman |
| (Iran) Rahim Dastneshan | advisor |
| (Iran) Hamidreza Baindarian | Member of the Board |
| (Iran) Vahid Nasiri | Member of the Board |
| (Iran) Habib Hosseinzadegan | Member of the Board |
| (Iran) Amir Arab | Member of the Board |

== Competitions ==
=== Overall record ===
| Competition | First match | Last match | Starting round | Final position | Record | | | | | | | |
| Competition | First match | Last match | Starting round | Final position | Pld | W | D | L | GF | GA | GD | Win % |
|---|---|---|---|---|---|---|---|---|---|---|---|---|
| Persian Gulf Pro League | 11 August 2022 | | Matchday 1 | | 15 | 5 | 5 | 5 | 18 | 20 | −2 | 33.33 |
| Hazfi Cup | 11 January 2023 | | Round of 32 | | 0 | 0 | 0 | 0 | 0 | 0 | +0 | — |
| Iranian Super Cup | 2 November 2022 | | Final | Runners-up | 1 | 0 | 0 | 1 | 0 | 1 | −1 | 0.00 |
| Total | | | | | 16 | 5 | 5 | 6 | 18 | 21 | −3 | 31.25 |

Last updated: 10 January 2023
Source: Soccerway

=== Persian Gulf Pro League ===
==== League table ====
| Pos | Team | Pld | W | D | L | GF | GA | GD | Pts | Qualification or relegation |
|---|---|---|---|---|---|---|---|---|---|---|
| 11 | Paykan | 30 | 5 | 13 | 12 | 12 | 28 | −16 | 28 | |
| 12 | Malavan | 30 | 5 | 12 | 13 | 21 | 40 | −19 | 27 | |
| 13 | Nassaji Mazandaran | 30 | 5 | 11 | 14 | 26 | 44 | −18 | 26 | Qualification for 2023–24 AFC Champions League group stage (Note: Qualified to AFC Champions League group stage by winning the 2021–22 Hazfi Cup.) |
| 14 | Sanat Naft | 30 | 5 | 10 | 15 | 22 | 36 | −14 | 25 | |
| 15 | Mes Kerman (R) | 30 | 4 | 10 | 16 | 22 | 37 | −15 | 22 | Relegation to 2023–24 Azadegan League |

Source: Iran Football League Organization - League Full Table, Iplstats
Rules for classification: 1) Points; 2) Head-to-head points; 3) Head-to-head goal difference; 4) Total goal difference; 5) Total goals scored; 6) Play-off at neutral venue.

==== Results summary ====
| Overall | | | | | | | | Home | | | | | | Away | | | | | |
| Pld | W | D | L | GF | GA | GD | Pts | W | D | L | GF | GA | GD | W | D | L | GF | GA | GD |
|---|---|---|---|---|---|---|---|---|---|---|---|---|---|---|---|---|---|---|---|
| 0 | 0 | 0 | 0 | 0 | 0 | 0 | 0 | 0 | 0 | 0 | 0 | 0 | 0 | 0 | 0 | 0 | 0 | 0 | 0 |

==== Results by round ====
| Round | 1 | 2 | 3 | 4 | 5 | 6 | 7 | 8 | 9 | 10 | 11 | 12 | 13 | 14 | 15 | 16 | 17 | 18 | 19 | 20 | 21 | 22 | 23 | 24 | 25 | 26 | 27 | 28 | 29 | 30 |
|---|---|---|---|---|---|---|---|---|---|---|---|---|---|---|---|---|---|---|---|---|---|---|---|---|---|---|---|---|---|---|
| Ground | | | | | | | | | | | | | | | | | | | | | | | | | | | | | | |
| Result | | | | | | | | | | | | | | | | | | | | | | | | | | | | | | |
| Position | | | | | | | | | | | | | | | | | | | | | | | | | | | | | | |

A = Away; H = Home; W = Win; D = Draw; L = Loss; P = Postponed

=== Iranian Super Cup ===
| TBD Final | Esteghlal | v | Nassaji | TBD |
| --:-- IRST (UTC+3:30) | | | | Stadium: TBD |
