= Rahim Dastneshan =

Iranian footballer, manager, and director

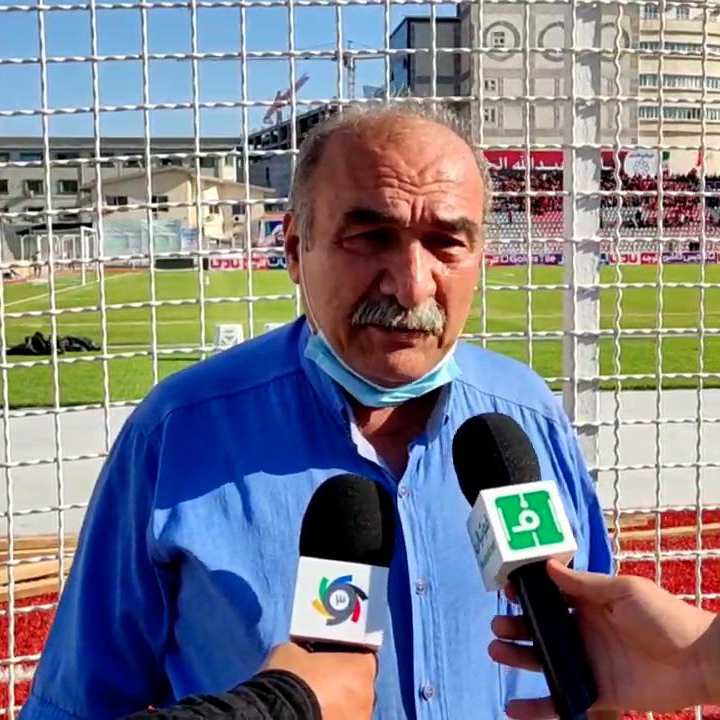

Personal information
- Full name: Rahim Dastneshan
- Date of birth: August 19, 1950 (age 76)
- Place of birth: Qa'em Shahr, Iran
- Position: Midfielder

Senior career*
Years	Team	Apps	(Gls)
- Nassaji Mazandaran

Managerial career
- 1977–1983: Bank Mellat Qa'em Shahr
- 1983–1994: Nassaji Mazandaran
- 1995–1996: Nassaji Mazandaran
- 2004: Nassaji Mazandaran
- 2008: Nassaji Mazandaran
- * Club domestic league appearances and goals

Rahim Dastneshan (Persian: رحیم دست نشان, born on 19 August 1960 in Qa'em Shahr) is a retired Iranian football player and now a director and coach. He is the most successful coach in the history of Nassaji Mazandaran Club. Maintaining and uniting the Nassaji Mazandaran Club in the 1980s was one of his services. Hence he is considered the father of Nassaji.

== Personal life ==
Rahim Dastneshan was born on August 19, 1950, in Seyedmahaleh, Qaemshahr (formerly known as Shahi). He is the older brother of Nader Dastneshan. He got married at the age of 27, and the marriage resulted in three children: two sons and one daughter.

== Sports Life as a Player ==
His family home was near the Shahid Vatani Stadium. Behind this stadium was a garden named Bagh-e Fada'i, where he used to play football. He then started at Nassaji and moved on to the Mazandaran provincial team.

== Coaching career ==
Rahim Dastneshan turned to coaching at the age of 27. Initially, he became the coach for Nassaji's youth team, then moved to Bank Tehran where he also played, and later became the coach for Bank Melli. Finally, in 1983, he became the head coach of Nassaji and achieved desirable results.

During his early and eleven-year coaching career, Dastneshan marked Nassaji's best days in the Quds League and the Azadegan Cup, and his teams were among the good teams in these competitions. He holds the record for the longest duration and the highest number of coaching stints. He was Nassaji's coach for about 14 years in four different periods, from his first year of coaching in 1983 to his last in 2009.
