= 2020–21 Persian Gulf Pro League =

20th season of Persian Gulf Pro League

Persian Gulf Pro League
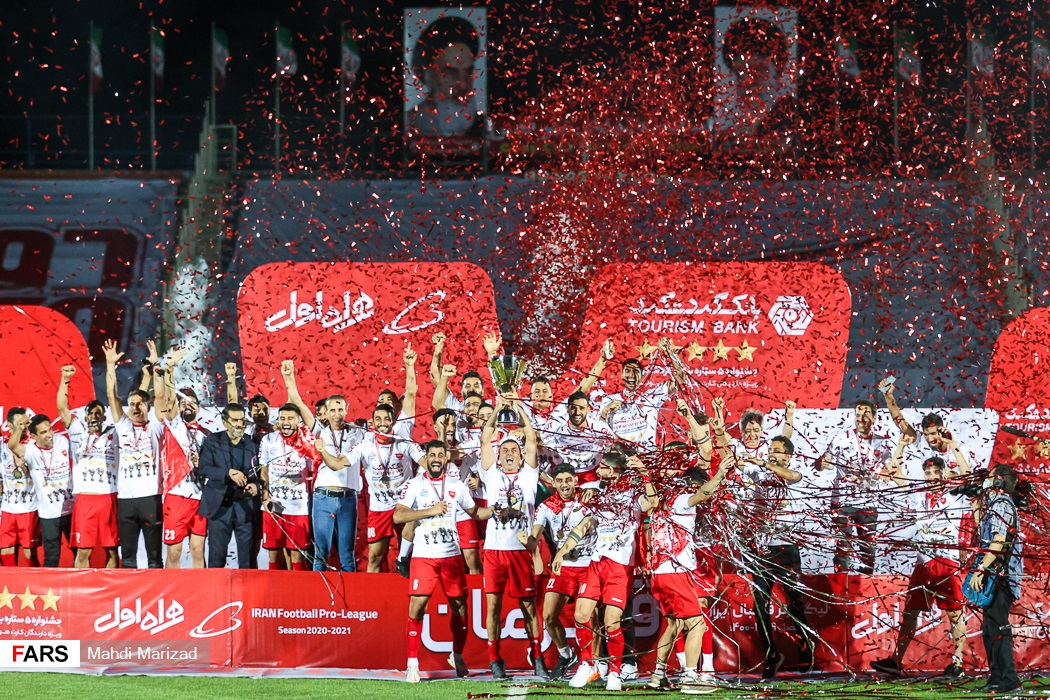
- Season: 2020–21
- Dates: 6 November 2020 – 30 July 2021
- Champions: Persepolis; 7th Pro League title 14th Iranian title
- Relegated: Machine Sazi; Saipa
- Champions League: Sepahan; Foolad
- Matches: 240
- Goals: 476 (1.98 per match)
- Top goalscorer: Sajjad Shahbazzadeh (20 goals)
- Best goalkeeper: Hamed Lak (17 clean sheets)
- Biggest home win: Sepahan 5–1 Mes (16 May 2021)
- Biggest away win: Aluminium Arak 1–6 Sepahan (6 March 2021)
- Highest scoring: Aluminium Arak 1–6 Sepahan (6 March 2021)
- Longest winning run: Persepolis . Sepahan (6 matches)
- Longest unbeaten run: Persepolis (20 matches)
- Longest winless run: Machine Sazi (14 matches)
- Longest losing run: Naft Masjed Soleyman . Aluminium Arak (5 matches)
- Total attendance: 0

The 2020–21 Persian Gulf Pro League (formerly known as Iran Pro League) were the 38th season of Iran's Football League and 20th as Persian Gulf Pro League since its establishment in 2001. Persepolis were the defending champions. The season featured 14 teams from the 2019–20 Persian Gulf Pro League and two new teams promoted from the 2019–20 Azadegan League: Mes Rafsanjan and Aluminium Arak.

The 2020–21 season started on 6 November 2020 and was ended on 30 July 2021. Persepolis won their record-extending 5th consecutive title and 14th title overall (7th in the Pro League era)

== Teams ==
=== Stadia and locations ===
Locations of clubs in 2020–21 Persian Gulf Pro League

Team	Location	Stadium	Capacity
(Iran) Aluminium Arak	Arak	Imam Khomeini	15,000
(Iran) Esteghlal	Tehran	Azadi	78,116
(Iran) Foolad	Ahvaz	Foolad Arena	30,655
(Iran) Gol Gohar Sirjan	Sirjan	Imam Ali; Qasem Soleimani	8,000; 9,000
(Iran) Machine Sazi	Tabriz	Qasem Soleimani	12,000
(Iran) Mes Rafsanjan	Rafsanjan	Shohadaye Mes	2,000
(Iran) Naft Masjed Soleyman	Masjed Soleyman	Behnam Mohammadi	8,000
(Iran) Nassaji Mazandaran	Qaem Shahr	Vatani	15,000
(Iran) Paykan	Shahr-e Qods	Shahr-e Qods	25,000
(Iran) Persepolis	Tehran	Azadi	78,116
(Iran) Saipa	Tehran	Dastgerdi	8,250
(Iran) Sanat Naft	Abadan	Takhti Abadan	10,000
(Iran) Sepahan	Isfahan	Naghsh-e-Jahan	75,000
(Iran) Padideh	Mashhad	Imam Reza	27,700
(Iran) Tractor	Tabriz	Yadegar-e Emam	66,833
(Iran) Zob Ahan	Fooladshahr	Fooladshahr	15,000

=== Personnel and kits ===
Note: Flags indicate national team as has been defined under FIFA eligibility rules. Players may hold more than one non-FIFA nationality.

Team	Manager	Captain
Aluminium Arak	(Iran) Alireza Mansourian	(Iran) Meysam Majidi
Esteghlal	(Iran) Farhad Majidi	(Iran) Voria Ghafouri
Foolad	(Iran) Javad Nekounam	(Iran) Ayoub Vali
Gol Gohar	(Iran) Amir Ghalenoei	(Iran) Mehran Golzari
Machine Sazi	(Iran) Alireza Akbarpour	(Iran) Habib Gordani
Mes Rafsanjan	(Iran) Mohammad Rabiei	(Iran) Hamed Noormohammadi
Naft MIS	(Iran) Mahmoud Fekri	(Iran) Abbas Asgari
Nassaji	(Iran) Saket Elhami	(Iran) Hamed Shiri
Paykan	(Iran) Mehdi Tartar	(Iran) Ali Hamoudi
Persepolis	(Iran) Yahya Golmohammadi	(Iran) Jalal Hosseini
Saipa	(Iran) Faraz Kamalvand	(Iran) Sadegh Barani
Sanat Naft	(Iran) Sirous Pourmousavi	(Iran) Hossein Baghlani
Sepahan	(Iran) Moharram Navidkia	(Iran) Ehsan Hajsafi
Shahr Khodro	(Iran) Mehdi Rahmati	(Iran) Reza Nasehi
Tractor	(Iran) Firouz Karimi	(Iran) Mohammad Reza Akhbari
Zob Ahan	(Iran) Mojtaba Hosseini	(Iran) Ghasem Haddadifar

=== Managerial changes ===
Team	Outgoing head coach	Manner of departure	Date of vacancy	Position in table	Incoming head coach	Date of appointment
Sepahan	(Portugal) Miguel Teixeira	End of Caretaker Spell	10 August 2020	Pre-season	(Iran) Moharram Navidkia	5 September 2020
Machine Sazi	(Iran) Human Afazeli	Resigned	18 August 2020	Pre-season	(Iran) Vahid Bayatloo	26 August 2020
Naft MIS	(Iran) Mehdi Tartar	Resigned	13 August 2020	Pre-season	(Iran) Mojtaba Hosseini	16 August 2020
Zob Ahan	(Croatia) Luka Bonačić	Sacked	15 August 2020	Pre-season	(Iran) Rahman Rezaei	4 September 2020
Shahr Khodro	(Iran) Sohrab Bakhtiarizadeh	Sacked	30 August 2020	Pre-season	(Iran) Mehdi Rahmati	31 August 2020
Gol Gohar Sirjan	(Iran) Majid Jalali	Sacked	3 September 2020	Pre-season	(Iran) Amir Ghalenoei	3 September 2020
Esteghlal	(Iran) Farhad Majidi	Resigned	5 September 2020	Pre-season	(Iran) Mahmoud Fekri	7 October 2020
Tractor	(Iran) Saket Elhami	Resigned	5 September 2020	Pre-season	(Iran) Alireza Mansourian	17 September 2020
Sanat Naft	(Iran) Behnam Seraj	Sacked	22 September 2020	Pre-season	(Iran) Sirous Pourmousavi	22 September 2020
Nassaji	(Iran) Mahmoud Fekri	Signed with Esteghlal	6 October 2020	Pre-season	(Iran) Vahid Fazeli	8 October 2020
Paykan	(Iran) Abdollah Veisi	Resigned	30 October 2020	Pre-season	(Iran) Mehdi Tartar	4 November 2020

== Foreign players ==
The number of foreign players is restricted to four per Persian Gulf Pro League team, including a slot for a player from AFC countries. A team can use four foreign players on the field in each game, including at least one player from the AFC country.
In bold: Players that have been capped for their national team.

Club	Player 1	Player 2	Player 3	Asian Player	Former Player
Aluminium Arak					
Esteghlal	(Croatia) **Hrvoje Milić**	(Mali) **Cheick Diabaté**			
Foolad	(Brazil) Chimba	(Mali) Moussa Coulibaly	(South Africa) **Ayanda Patosi**		
Gol Gohar	(Nigeria) Godwin Mensha				
Machine Sazi					
Mes Rafsanjan					
Naft MIS					
Nassaji					
Paykan					
Persepolis	(Croatia) Božidar Radošević				(Iraq) **Bashar Resan**
Saipa					
Sanat Naft					
Sepahan	(Brazil) Kiros	(Georgia (country)) **Giorgi Gvelesiani**			
Shahr Khodro					
Tractor					(Algeria) **Okacha Hamzaoui**
Zob Ahan	(Serbia) Darko Bjedov	(Serbia) Ivan Marković			

== League table ==
=== Standings ===
Pos	Team	Pld	W	D	L	GF	GA	GD	Pts	Qualification or relegation
1	Persepolis (Note: Persepolis and Esteghlal did not obtain an AFC license. Therefore, even if they earn the right to play in Asian competitions based on league position, they will not be able to participate.) (C)	30	19	10	1	47	14	+33	67	
2	Sepahan	30	19	8	3	53	24	+29	65	Qualification for 2022 AFC Champions League group stage
3	Esteghlal	30	16	8	6	36	19	+17	56	
4	Tractor	30	12	9	9	35	29	+6	45	
5	Gol Gohar	30	13	6	11	33	32	+1	45	
6	Foolad	30	10	14	6	27	18	+9	44	Qualification for 2022 AFC Champions League group stage (Note: Foolad qualified to AFC Champions League by winning the Hazfi Cup)
7	Paykan	30	9	13	8	32	30	+2	40	
8	Mes Rafsanjan	30	10	9	11	23	29	−6	39	
9	Padideh	30	10	8	12	27	31	−4	38	
10	Sanat Naft	30	9	10	11	24	29	−5	37	
11	Aluminium Arak	30	8	13	9	25	33	−8	37	
12	Nassaji Mazandaran	30	9	6	15	27	34	−7	33	
13	Naft Masjed Soleyman	30	7	10	13	21	29	−8	31	
14	Zob Ahan	30	5	11	14	28	39	−11	26	
15	Saipa (R)	30	5	11	14	19	34	−15	26	Relegation to 2021–22 Azadegan League
16	Machine Sazi (R)	30	2	8	20	19	52	−33	14	Relegation to 2021–22 Azadegan League

Updated to match(es) played on 30 July 2021. Source: IPL Table, Soccerway
Rules for classification: 1) Points; 2) Goal difference; 3) Goals scored.
(C) Champions; (R) Relegated

== Results ==
Home \ Away	ALU	EST	FOL	GOL	MST	MES	MIS	NSJ	PAY	PRS	SAP	SNA	SEP	SHK	TRC	ZOB
Aluminium Arak	—	0–0	0–0	0–0	4–1	0–0	0–1	0–3	1–1	2–1	1–1	1–0	1–6	1–0	1–3	2–2
Esteghlal	2–0	—	1–0	2–0	1–0	2–0	1–0	1–0	0–0	2–2	0–1	1–1	1–2	2–0	2–1	0–2
Foolad	0–0	2–1	—	1–0	1–0	1–1	2–0	1–0	0–0	0–0	3–0	2–0	0–0	2–0	1–1	1–0
Gol Gohar	2–1	1–2	1–1	—	3–1	0–0	0–0	2–2	1–2	0–5	1–0	1–0	3–1	3–1	1–2	1–0
Machine Sazi	1–1	0–2	0–1	0–1	—	3–0	0–1	0–2	0–5	0–5	2–2	1–0	3–3	1–1	0–1	1–1
Mes Rafsanjan	0–1	1–1	2–1	0–2	1–0	—	2–0	0–1	1–1	0–1	1–0	0–0	1–2	2–1	0–1	3–1
Naft MIS	1–2	1–1	1–0	1–2	1–0	1–0	—	0–2	0–1	0–0	1–1	1–2	3–1	3–1	1–1	2–3
Nassaji	1–1	1–3	1–0	1–2	1–1	0–1	1–0	—	0–1	1–1	1–0	0–1	0–1	1–0	1–1	2–3
Paykan	0–0	0–0	1–1	0–2	2–2	2–3	1–1	2–1	—	0–2	1–1	2–0	1–1	1–0	1–1	1–0
Persepolis	2–0	1–0	2–1	3–1	2–1	1–0	2–1	2–0	1–0	—	1–0	1–0	0–0	3–0	3–1	1–1
Saipa	1–0	0–2	2–1	0–1	0–0	0–0	0–0	1–0	1–2	0–0	—	1–1	0–1	1–2	1–2	2–1
Sanat Naft	0–1	0–1	1–1	2–1	2–1	1–1	2–0	1–1	2–1	0–0	1–0	—	1–2	0–0	2–1	1–0
Sepahan	1–0	2–0	1–1	1–0	1–0	5–1	0–0	4–0	2–1	1–1	1–1	4–1	—	1–3	2–0	2–0
Shahr Khodro	2–2	0–2	0–0	1–0	3–0	0–1	1–0	1–0	2–0	1–1	1–0	1–1	0–1	—	2–1	1–1
Tractor	0–1	1–3	0–0	1–0	2–0	0–0	0–0	2–1	3–1	0–1	5–1	1–1	0–1	0–0	—	1–0
Zob Ahan	1–1	0–0	2–2	1–1	2–0	0–1	0–0	1–2	1–1	1–2	1–1	1–0	1–3	0–2	1–2	—

Updated to match(es) played on 30 July 2021. Source: IPL Stats, Soccerway
Legend: Blue = home team win; Yellow = draw; Red = away team win.
For upcoming matches, an "a" indicates there is an article about the rivalry between the two participants.

=== Positions by round ===
Team ╲ Round	1	2	3	4	5	6	7	8	9	10	11	12	13	14	15	16	17	18	19	20	21	22	23	24	25	26	27	28	29	30
Persepolis	9	4	6	2	2	4	4	6	2	2	2	3	1	1	1	1	1	2	2	1	1	1	2	1	1	1	1	1	1	1
Sepahan	13	9	3	6	10	6	5	2	3	4	4	2	4	3	2	2	2	1	1	2	2	2	1	2	2	2	2	2	2	2
Esteghlal	4	6	2	5	4	1	2	4	1	1	1	1	2	2	3	3	3	3	3	3	3	3	3	3	3	3	3	3	3	3
Tractor	11	11	13	10	12	8	3	7	7	5	5	5	6	7	7	6	5	5	5	6	7	7	7	7	5	8	5	4	6	4
Gol Gohar	3	1	1	1	1	5	1	1	5	8	9	10	8	8	9	9	8	8	8	4	4	4	4	6	7	4	6	5	4	5
Foolad	6	3	4	7	7	3	7	5	6	7	7	6	5	5	4	4	4	4	4	5	5	6	6	5	6	7	4	6	5	6
Paykan	12	7	9	9	5	7	10	10	8	6	6	8	11	11	11	10	11	11	11	11	9	11	11	11	10	9	9	7	7	7
Mes Rafsanjan	14	16	16	16	15	14	13	14	14	14	12	12	12	9	8	8	7	7	7	8	8	9	9	12	12	11	11	11	10	8
Shahr Khodro	2	5	8	11	8	10	14	13	12	9	13	13	9	12	12	12	10	10	10	10	11	8	8	8	8	5	7	8	8	9
Sanat Naft	5	8	10	4	6	2	6	3	4	3	3	4	3	4	5	7	6	6	6	7	10	12	12	9	9	10	10	10	11	10
Aluminium Arak	15	15	15	14	13	12	8	9	10	11	11	11	7	6	6	5	9	9	9	9	6	5	5	4	4	6	8	9	9	11
Nassaji	1	2	7	3	3	9	11	12	13	13	14	14	15	15	15	15	15	15	15	15	14	14	14	14	14	13	13	12	12	12
Naft MIS	10	13	12	13	11	13	9	8	9	10	8	7	10	10	10	11	12	12	12	12	12	10	10	10	11	12	12	13	13	13
Zob Ahan	7	10	11	12	14	15	15	15	15	15	15	15	14	14	14	14	14	14	14	14	13	15	15	15	15	14	14	14	14	14
Saipa	8	12	5	8	9	11	12	11	11	12	10	9	13	13	13	13	13	13	13	13	15	13	13	13	13	15	15	15	15	15
Machine Sazi	16	14	14	15	16	16	16	16	16	16	16	16	16	16	16	16	16	16	16	16	16	16	16	16	16	16	16	16	16	16

Leader : 2022 AFC Champions League Group stage
2022 AFC Champions League qualifying play-off round
Relegation to 2021-22 Azadegan League

Updated to match(es) played on 30 July 2021. Source: IPL Table

== Season statistics ==
As of 31 July 2021

=== Top scorers ===
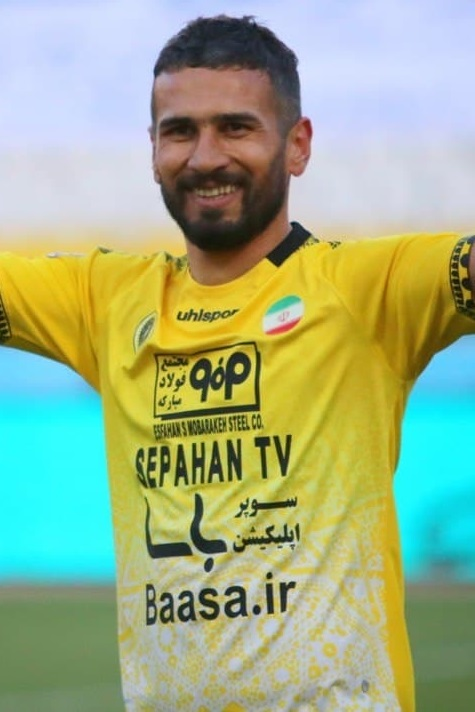
Sepahan player Sajjad Shahbazzadeh won the Persian Gulf Pro League Golden Boot by scoring 20 goals.

Rank	Player	Club	Goals
1	(Iran) Sajjad Shahbazzadeh	Sepahan	20
2	(Nigeria) Godwin Mensha	Gol Gohar	14
3	(Iran) Mohammad Abbaszadeh	Tractor	12
4	(Iran) Amin Ghaseminejad	Padideh	11
5	(Iran) Hamed Pakdel	Aluminium Arak	10
5	(Iran) Ahmad Nourollahi	Persepolis	10
7	(Iran) Mehdi Abdi	Persepolis	9
7	(Iran) Taleb Reykani	Sanat Naft	9
9	(Iran) Younes Shakeri	Gol Gohar	8
10	(Iran) Sasan Hosseini	Naft MIS	7
10	(Iran) Amir Arsalan Motahari	Esteghlal	7

=== Hat-tricks ===
Player	For	Against	Result	Date
(Nigeria) Godwin Mensha	Gol Gohar	Shahr Khodro	3–1 (H)	18 December 2020
(Iran) Peyman Babaei	Machine Sazi	Sepahan	3–3 (H)	29 December 2020
(Iran) Younes Shakeri	Gol Gohar	Machine Sazi	3–1 (H)	5 April 2021

=== Clean sheets ===
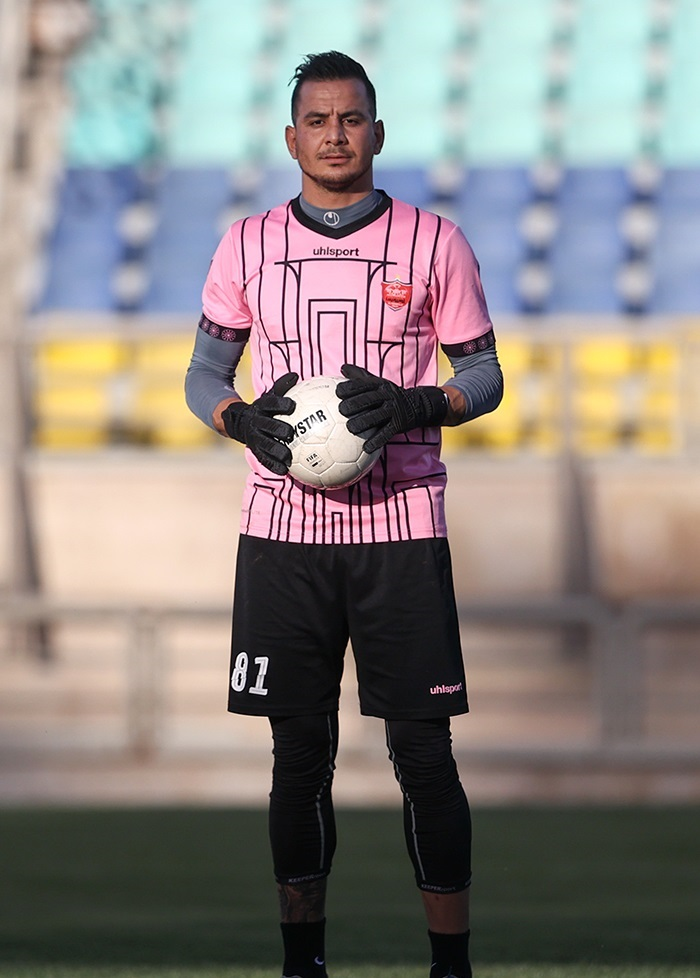
Hamed Lak won the Persian Gulf Pro League Golden Glove after keeping 17 clean sheets for Persepolis.

Rank	Player	Club	Clean sheets
1	(Iran) Hamed Lak	Persepolis	17
2	(Iran) Payam Niazmand	Sepahan	14
3	(Iran) Hossein Pour Hamidi	Aluminium Arak	11
4	(Iran) Rashid Mazaheri	Esteghlal	10
5	(Iran) Mohsen Forouzan	Foolad	9
6	(Iran) Mohammad Reza Akhbari	Tractor	8
7	(Iran) Hossein Akbar Monadi	Saipa	6
7	(Iran) Milad Farahani	Padideh	6
7	(Iran) Alireza Haghighi	Gol Gohar	6
7	(Iran) Farhad Kermanshahi	Naft Masjed Soleyman	6
7	(Iran) Davoud Noushi Soufiani	Mes Rafsanjan	6

== See also ==
- 2020–21 Azadegan League
- 2020–21 League 2
- 2020–21 League 3
- 2020–21 Hazfi Cup
- 2020 Iranian Super Cup
- 2021 AFC Champions League
