= List of Esteghlal F.C. chairmen =

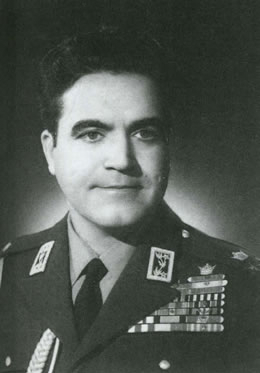
Parviz Khosravani, co founder, first chairman and later owner of the club from 1950 to 1979.

Esteghlal F.C. is an Iranian professional association football club base in Tehran. The club was formed in Ferdowsi Street, central Tehran on 26 September 1945 as Docharkhesavaran and was renamed to Taj F.C. on 11 February 1950. In spring of 1979 and only a few weeks after the Iranian revolution the club was renamed to its current name, Esteghlal F.C.

== Chairmen ==
Key

- Chairmen with this background in the "Chairman" column are italicised to denote acting chairmen.

List of Esteghlal F.C. chairmen
Chairman	Tenure
(Iran) Parviz Khosravani	September 1945 – June 1950
(Iran) Parviz Sheikhan	June 1950 – February 1979
(Iran) Enayatollah Atashi (acting)	April 1979 – May 1979
(Iran) Abbas Kordnouri	May 1979 – May 1985
(Iran) Nader Faryadshiran	June 1985 – September 1985
(Iran) Abbas Nekoyeh	January 1986 – June 1989
(Iran) Ali Agha-Mohammadi	June 1989 – September 1989
(Iran) Kazem Oliaei	October 1989 – May 1996
(Iran) Ali Fathollahzadeh	28 October 1996 – 20 May 2003
(Iran) Mohammadhossein Gharib	20 May 2003 – 25 June 2005
(Iran) Kazem Oliaei	13 July 2005 – 30 January 2005
(Iran) Mohammadhossein Gharib	30 January 2005 – 1 September 2006
(Iran) Manouchehr Salehi (acting)	4 September 2006 – 14 October 2006
(Iran) Meghdad Najafnejad	14 October 2006 – 27 February 2007
(Iran) Mohammadreza Bahmani (acting)	February 2007 – 30 April 2007
(Iran) Ali Fathollahzadeh	30 April 2007 – 17 September 2008
(Iran) Amir Reza Vaezi-Ashtiani	20 September 2008 – 31 May 2010
(Iran) Ali Fathollahzadeh	9 June 2010 – 17 May 2014
(Iran) Bahram Afsharzadeh	17 May 2014 – 2 August 2016
(Iran) Reza Hassanikho	3 August 2016 – 6 August 2016
(Iran) Reza Eftekhari	7 August 2016 – 22 June 2018
(Iran) Amir Hossein Fathi	22 June 2018 – 10 December 2019
(Iran) Esmaeil Khalilzadeh (acting)	12 December 2019 – 25 February 2020
(Iran) Ali Fathollahzadeh (acting)	26 February 2020 – 20 March 2020
(Iran) Ahmad Saadatmand	29 March 2020 – 30 September 2020
(Iran) Ahmad Madadi	1 October 2020 – 24 September 2021
(Iran) Mostafa Ajorlu	24 September 2021 – 15 October 2022
(Iran) Ali Fathollahzadeh	15 October 2022 – 11 April 2023
(Iran) Hojjat Karimi (acting)	11 April 2023 – 5 July 2023
(Iran) Ali Khatir	8 July 2023 – 1 May 2024
(Iran) Farshid Samiei(acting)	1 May 2024 – 20 July 2024
(Iran) Farshid Samiei	20 July 2024 – 8 January 2025
(Iran) Ali Nazari Juybari	8 January 2025 – 13 August 2025
(Iran) Ali Tajernia(acting)	13 August 2025 — 25 October 2026
(Iran) Mostafa Motedayyen	25 October 2026 — Present

== See also ==
- List of Esteghlal F.C. records and statistics
- List of Esteghlal F.C. honours

== Sources ==
- Esteghlal seasons stats Page
- Iran Premier League Stats
- RSSSF database about Iranian league football.
- Persian League

== Bibliography ==
- Ahmadi, Seyyed Ali Akbar (21 December 2009). Esteghlal Full History of the Club from Docharkheh Savaran and Taj to Esteghlal. Paygan. ISBN 978-600-5096-54-5.
