= Hossein Zamehran =

Iranian footballer

Farzad Zamehran
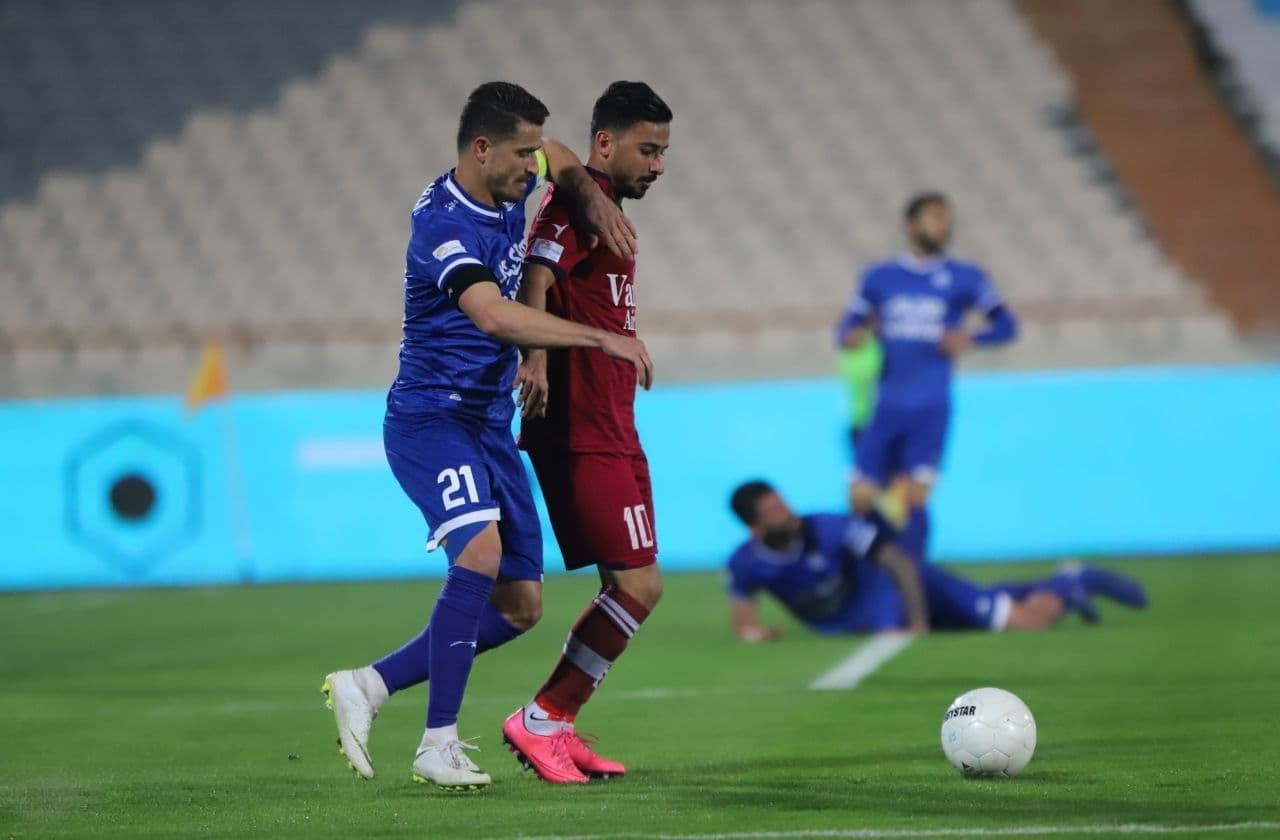

Personal information
- Full name: Hossein Zamehran
- Date of birth: 21 March 1992 (age 34)
- Place of birth: Mashhad, Iran
- Positions: Forward; winger

Team information
- Current team: Nassaji
- Number: 10

Youth career
- 2004–2006: Astan-e Ghods
- 2006–2008: Shahrdari Mashhad
- 2008–2009: Astan-e Ghods
- 2009–2011: Payam
- 2011–2012: Siah Jamegan
- 2012–2013: Mes Sarcheshmeh

Senior career*
Years	Team	Apps	(Gls)
2009–2011	Payam	10	(0)
2011–2012	Siah Jamegan		
2012–2013	Mes Sarcheshmeh	3	(0)
2013–2015	Padideh	3	(0)
2015	→ Siah Jamegan (loan)	10	(4)
2015–2016	Siah Jamegan	22	(4)
2016–2017	Padideh	19	(2)
2017–2018	Machine Sazi	9	(0)
2018	Meshki Pooshan	11	(0)
2018–2019	Baadraan	26	(3)
2019–	Nassaji	138	(10)
- * Club domestic league appearances and goals as of 29 September 2024 @ 13:26(AEST)

Hossein Zamehran (Persian: حسین زامهران) is an Iranian football forward who plays for Nassaji in the Iran Pro League.

== Club career ==
Zamehran started his professional career with Payam Mashhad in 2009 while he promoted to first team by Davoud Mahabadi. He made his debut for Payam in 2010–11 season. Later, he moved to Siah Jamegan in Division 2. After shining with Mashadi side in Division 2, he joined Mes Sarcheshmeh. In summer 2013, he joined newly established side, Padideh. He was part of Padideh in promoting to Pro League in 2014. In the 2014–15 season, he failed in making any appearances for Padideh, so he joined to Siah Jamegan with a loan contract until end of the season in winter transfer window. He scored 4 times in 10 matches for Siah Jamegan and helped them to promoting to Pro League. In summer 2015, he moved to Siah Jamegan permanently with a contract until 2016. He made his professional debut in 2–1 loss against Esteghlal on 30 July 2015, where he used as a substitute for Reza Enayati. In his second appearance for Siah Jamegan, he scored against Naft Tehran in 1–0 win. He scored a goal in match of his team F.C. Nassaji Mazandaran against Tractor SC at minute 2:40, on 28 June 2020, which is the fastest goal by Tractor SC in Iran Football league.

== Club career statistics ==
As of 15 September 2015.

Club	Division	Season	League		Hazfi Cup		Asia		Other		Total	
Club	Division	Season	Apps	Goals	Apps	Goals	Apps	Goals	Apps	Goals	Appa	Goals
Payam Mashhad	Division 1	2009–10	0	0	0	0	–	–	0	0	0	0
Payam Mashhad	Division 1	2010–11	10	0	2	1	–	–	0	0	12	1
Payam Mashhad	Total		10	0	2	1	0	0	0	0	12	1
Siah Jamegan	Division 2	2011–12					–	–				
Mes Sarcheshmeh	Division 1	2012–13	3	0	0	0	–	–	0	0	3	0
Padideh	Azadegan League	2013–14	3	0	0	0	–	–	0	0	3	0
Padideh	Pro League	2014-15	0	0	0	0	–	–	0	0	0	0
Padideh	Total		3	0	0	0	0	0	0	0	3	0
Siah Jamegan	Division 1	2014-15	10	4	0	0	–	–	0	0	10	4
Siah Jamegan	Pro League	2015–16	22	4	0	0	–	–	0	0	22	4
Siah Jamegan	Total		32	8	0	0	0	0	0	0	32	8
Padide	Persian Gulf Pro League	2016-17	23	2	0	0	0	0	0	0	23	2
Machine Sazi	Azadegan League	2017-18	10	1	0	0	0	0	0	0	10	1
Siah Jamegan	Persian Gulf Pro League	2017-18	14	0	0	0	0	0	0	0	14	0
Baadraan	Azadegan League	2018-19	15	0	0	0	0	0	0	0	15	0
Nassaji	Persian Gulf Pro League	2019-20	14	1	0	0	0	0	0	0	14	1
Nassaji	Persian Gulf Pro League	2020-21	29	5	2	0	0	0	0	0	31	5
Nassaji	Persian Gulf Pro League	2021-22	18	0	1	0	0	0	0	0	19	0
Nassaji	Persian Gulf Pro League	2022-23	29	2	4	0	0	0	1	0	34	2
Nassaji	Persian Gulf Pro League	2023-24	20	1	1	0	5	0	0	0	26	1
Nassaji	Total		110	9	8	0	5	0	1	0	124	9
Career Totals			210	20	10	1	5	0	1	0	226	21

== Honours ==
=== Club ===
Padideh

- Azadegan League: 2013–14

Siah Jamegan

- Azadegan League: Runner-up 2014–15
