= Farhad Kouchakzadeh =

Iranian football manager

Personal information
- Date of birth: 23 August 1969 (age 57)
- Place of birth: Qaem Shahr, Iran
- Height: 1.92 m (6 ft 4 in)
- Position: Centre-back

Youth career
- –1989: Nassaji

Senior career*
Years	Team	Apps	(Gls)
1989–1994	Nassaji		
1994	Nirooye Zamini		
1994–1997	Nassaji		
1997–1999	Aboomoslem		
1999–2004	Saipa		

Managerial career
- 2009–2010: Nassaji (assistant)
- 2010: Nassaji (caretaker)
- 2013–2014: Gostaresh Foulad (assistant)
- 2019: Nassaji (assistant)
- 2022–2023: Darya Caspian
- 2023: Nassaji (assistant)
- 2023–2025: Nassaji (team director)
- * Club domestic league appearances and goals

Farhad Kouchakzadeh (Persian: فرهاد کوچک‌زاده; born 23 August 1969) is an Iranian football manager and a former player. He played for Nassaji, Aboomoslem and Saipa. He has a history of coaching Nassaji Mazandaran.
