= Esmaeil Esmaeili =

Iranian football manager (born 1967)

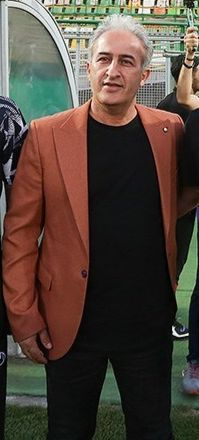

Personal information
- Date of birth: 1967 (age 58–59)
- Place of birth: Qaem Shahr, Iran
- Position: Defensive midfielder

Senior career*
Years	Team	Apps	(Gls)
1991–1992	Nassaji		
1992–1993	Sepidrood	5	(0)
1993–1995	Nassaji	12	(0)

Managerial career
- 1999–2000: Nassaji (assistant manager)
- 2003–2004: Shahid Ghandi (assistant manager)
- 2004–2005: Payam (assistant manager)
- 2005–2006: Mes Kerman (assistant manager)
- 2007–2008: Pegah (assistant manager)
- 2009: Nassaji
- 2009–2010: Nassaji (assistant manager)
- 2010–2011: Nassaji (technical director)
- 2011: Iran National Student Team
- 2011: Steel Azin (assistant manager)
- 2011–2012: Nassaji
- 2016–2017: Nassaji (technical director)
- 2017: Saba Qom
- 2017–2018: Bargh Jadid
- 2021–2022: Nassaji (assistant manager)
- 2022: Nassaji (team manager)
- 2022: Nassaji
- 2022–2023: Nassaji (team manager)
- * Club domestic league appearances and goals

Esmaeil Esmaeili (Persian: اسماعیل اسماعیلی; born 1967) is an Iranian football coach and a former player. He played for Nassaji and Sepidrood.

On 11 May 2022, Esmaeili became head coach of Nassaji in Persian Gulf Pro League, replacing Saket Elhami.
