= Mehrdad Abdi =

Iranian footballer

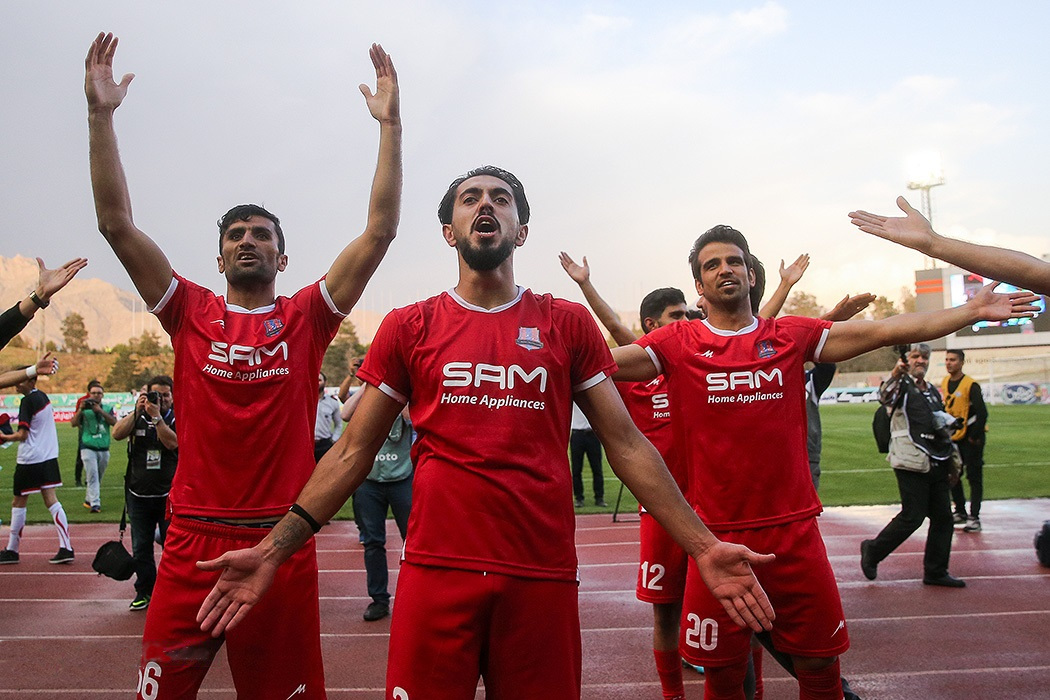

Personal information
- Date of birth: 13 August 1992 (age 34)
- Place of birth: Nowshahr, Iran
- Height: 1.83 m (6 ft 0 in)
- Position: Midfielder

Team information
- Current team: Nassaji
- Number: 39

Senior career*
Years	Team	Apps	(Gls)
2012–2015	Parseh	34	(1)
2015–2016	Gol Gohar	16	(1)
2018–2019	Nassaji	39	(3)
2019–2020	Gol Gohar	22	(2)
2020–2021	Saipa	26	(0)
2021–2024	Nassaji	69	(4)
- * Club domestic league appearances and goals as of 1 June 2024

Mehrdad Abdi (Persian: مهرداد عبدی; born 13 August 1992) is an Iranian football midfielder.

== Career statistics ==
=== Club ===
Club	Season	League			Cup		Continental		Other		Total	
Club	Season	League	Apps	Goals	Apps	Goals	Apps	Goals	Apps	Goals	Apps	Goals
Damash	2013-14	Azadegan League	2	0	0	0	0	0	0	0	2	0
Damash	2014-15	Azadegan League	4	0	1	0	0	0	0	0	5	0
Damash	2015-16	Azadegan League	14	0	0	0	0	0	0	0	14	0
Damash	Total		20	0	1	0	0	0	0	0	21	0
Gol Gohar	2015-16	Azadegan League	15	1	0	0	0	0	0	0	15	1
Gol Gohar	2016-17	Azadegan League	1	0	0	0	0	0	0	0	1	0
Gol Gohar	Total		16	1	0	0	0	0	0	0	16	1
Nassaji	2017-18	Azadegan League	18	1	2	0	0	0	0	0	20	1
Nassaji	2018-19	Persian Gulf Pro League	21	2	1	0	0	0	0	0	22	3
Nassaji	Total		39	3	3	1	0	0	0	0	42	4
Gol Gohar	2019-20	Persian Gulf Pro League	22	2	0	0	0	0	0	0	22	2
Saipa	2020-21	Persian Gulf Pro League	25	0	1	0	0	0	0	0	26	0
Nassaji Mazandaran	2021-22	Persian Gulf Pro League	20	0	5	1	0	0	0	0	25	1
Nassaji Mazandaran	2022-23	Persian Gulf Pro League	25	2	4	0	0	0	1	0	30	2
Nassaji Mazandaran	2023-24	Persian Gulf Pro League	15	1	1	0	5	0	0	0	21	1
Nassaji Mazandaran	Total		60	3	10	1	5	0	1	0	76	4
Career Total			182	9	15	2	5	0	1	0	203	11
