= Hossein Mesgar Saravi =

Iranian footballer and coach

Personal information
- Full name: Hossein Mesgar Saravi
- Date of birth: October 30, 1957 (age 68)
- Place of birth: Qaem Shahr, Iran
- Position: Defender

Senior career*
Years	Team	Apps	(Gls)
- Naft Qaemshahr
- Nassaji Mazandaran

International career^{‡}
1985–1986	Iran	15	(0)

Managerial career
- Nassaji Mazandaran
- Persepolis Shomal (assistant)
- Steel Azin (assistant)
- Nassaji Mazandaran (assistant)
- Shahrdari Arak (assistant)
- Nassaji Mazandaran (assistant)
- Nassaji Mazandaran (caretaker)
- * Club domestic league appearances and goals as of 19 December 2015 ‡ National team caps and goals as of 22 January 2016

Hossein Mesgar Saravi (Persian: حسین مسگر ساروی; born October 30, 1957, in Qaem Shahr) is a retired player and current coach of Iranian football. He wore the Iran national football team shirts during the years 2 and 4 while coaching the late Parviz Dehdari, Asgarzadeh, Ebrahimi and Reza Vatankhah. He was involved in nine national games and tied the captain's armband.
