= Ali Khatir =

Iranian sport administrator

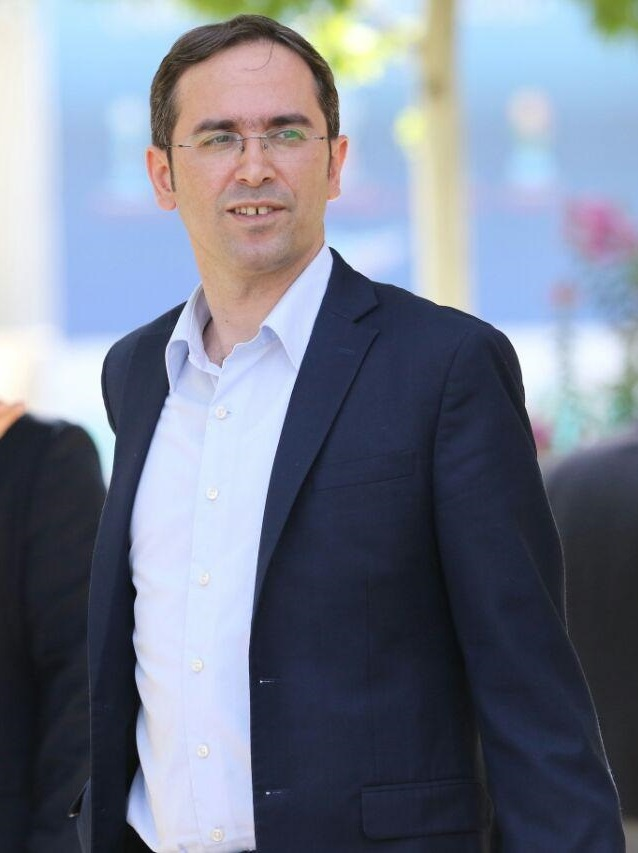
- Born: Ali Ahmadi Khatir; Qaem Shahr, Iran
- Education: Electrical engineering (Electric power system),Energy economics
- Alma mater: Sharif University of Technology; École Polytechnique Fédérale de Lausanne; International Centre for Sports Studies
- Employer: Swissgrid (2013–2015)

Ali Ahmadi Khatir is a sports manager from Iran who is currently the chief executive officer of F.C. Nassaji Mazandaran. He was elected as the acting CEO of Esteghlal F.C. on July 17, 1402, and was dismissed from the position of CEO on May 12, 1403. Also, in 1401, he was the vice-chairman of Tractor S.C. board of directors and the former sports deputy of Esteghlal and at one point he was the executive deputy of the general secretary of the Iran Football Federation.
