= Esteghlal Javan =

- Type: Daily
- Publisher: Ravagh
- Editor: Ali Agha Mohammadi
- Staff writers: Ali Fathollahzadeh; Deputy Editor: Jafar Nojavan
- Founded: 10 July 1993; 32 years ago
- Ceased publication: December 2015
- Headquarters: Tehran, Iran
- Website: esteghlaljavan.ir

Esteghlal Javan (Persian: استقلال جوان lit. Youth Esteghlal) is a Persian language daily newspaper published in Iran, founded in 1993.

== History and profile ==
Esteghlal Javan is a sports and football fan newspaper whose main content is related to Esteghlal Football Club. This newspaper started working in 1993 and at the beginning it was published as a weekly on Tuesdays. Esteghlal Javan later received newspaper ratings and is now published electronically. The newspaper's website, Instagram and Telegram channel are also active. The former editor-in-chief of Esteghlal Javan was Ali Fathollahzadeh and the deputy editor-in-chief is Jafar Nojavan.

== Newspaper closure ==
According to Ali Fathollahzadeh, the former editor-in-chief of Esteghlal Javan, the publication of the paper version of this newspaper was stopped on 16 December 2015, due to financial losses. The newspaper's website is still active. According to the newspaper's official website, after 28 years, Ali Fathollahzadeh and Ali Agha Mohammadi were removed from the management team of Esteghlal Javan.
