= Hamid Motahari =

Iranian footballer and manager

Personal information
- Date of birth: 25 April 1974 (age 52)
- Place of birth: Tehran, Iran
- Height: 1.86 m (6 ft 1 in)
- Position: Midfielder

Team information
- Current team: Foolad (head coach)

Youth career
- 1990–1992: Vahdat

Senior career*
Years	Team	Apps	(Gls)
1993–1996	Sepahan	9	(2)
1995–1997	Fath Tehran F.C.	60	(9)
1996–1997	Keshavarz	22	(1)
1997–1999	Persepolis	8	(2)

International career
1991–1993	Iran U20		(5)
1993–1995	Iran U23		(3)

Managerial career
- 2007–2009: Saba Qom (assistant)
- 2009–2011: Rah Ahan (assistant)
- 2012: Saba Qom (assistant)
- 2014–2015: Saipa (assistant)
- 2016–2018: Paykan (assistant)
- 2019: Nassaji Mazandaran (assistant)
- 2019–2020: Shahr Khodro (assistant)
- 2020–2022: Persepolis (assistant)
- 2022–2023: Nassaji Mazandaran
- 2023–2024: Iran (assistant)
- 2024: Tractor (caretaker)
- 2024–2026: Foolad (assistant)
- 2026–: Foolad
- * Club domestic league appearances and goals

Hamid Motahari (Persian: حمید مطهری) was born on 25 April 1974 in Tehran, Iran. He an Iranian football coach and former player. He currently serves as the head coach of Foolad Khuzestan.

== Early life ==
Hamid Motahari was born in Tehran, Iran, on 25 April 1974. He is married and has one daughter named Harir.

== Club career ==
Motahari began his career as a midfielder with the youth team Vahdat and later played for both the youth and senior team simultaneously. He professionally played for teams such as Sepahan and Keshavarz. He later joined Persepolis, but his playing career at Persepolis was cut short due to a serious injury.

== International career ==
Motahari represented Iran in the U-20 team from 1991 to 1993 and the U-23 team from 1993 to 1995

== Managerial career ==
=== Saba Qom ===
In 2007, Motahari started his coaching career as an assistant coach at Saba Qom.

=== Rah Ahan ===
In 2009, at the age of 35, Motahari joined Rah Ahan as a coach. He served as an assistant coach in the technical staff of the club for about two years.

=== Persepolis U-23 ===
In 2014, Motahari became the head coach of Persepolis U–23.

=== Saipa ===
Motahari joined Saipa in the subsequent year.

=== Paykan ===
In 2016, Motahari signed a contract with Paykan and worked as an assistant coach under Majid Jalali for two years.

=== Nassaji ===
After a brief experience elsewhere, Motahari joined Nassaji Mazandaran.

=== Shahr Khodro ===
In 2019, Motahari was a member of the technical staff at Shahr Khodro.

=== Persepolis ===
When Yahya Golmohammadi was part of the Persepolis team, Motahari also joined the club.

Hamid Motahhari has been Yahya Golmohammadi's assistant in Persepolis since 2020.

=== Nassaji Mazandaran ===
Motahari was appointed as new head coach of Nassaji football team.

=== Foolad Khuzestan ===
He served as a coach at Foolad Khuzestan in 2024, a role he held until 2026, when he was appointed as the club's head coach—a position he currently holds. He currently serves as the head coach of Foolad Khuzestan.

== Career statistics ==
Appearances and goals by club, season and competition
Club	Season	Division	Apps	Goals
Vahdat	1990-1992	Second Division		
Sepahan	1993-1996	Azadegan League		2
Fath Tehran	1995-1997	Azadegan League		
Keshavarz	1996-1997	Azadegan League		1
Persepolis	1997-1999	Azadegan League		2

- Club
- Vahdat 1990–1992
- Sepahan Azadegan League 1993–1996
- Fath Tehran Azadegan League 1995–1997
- Keshavarz Azadegan League 1996–1997
- Persepolis Azadegan League 1997–1999
- International

Appearances and goals by national team and year
National team	Year	Apps	Goals
Iran U-20	1991–1993		5
Iran U-23	1993–1995		3

== Honours ==
=== Coaching ===
Persepolis (as Assistant Coach)

- Persian Gulf Pro League (2): 2019–20, 2020–21; Runner-Up: 2021–22
- Iranian Super Cup (1): 2020; Runner-Up: 2021
- AFC Champions League Runner-Up: 2020

Nassaji Mazandaran (as Head Coach)

- Iranian Super Cup Runner-up: 2022
