= Vahid Fazeli =

Iranian football manager (born 1982)

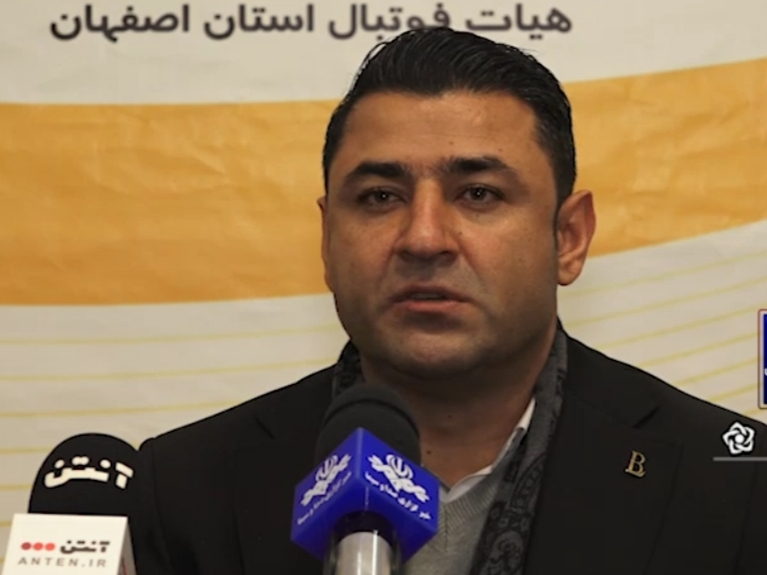
- Football coach

Personal information
- Full name: Vahid Fazeli Aliabad
- Date of birth: January 29, 1982 (age 44)
- Place of birth: Tehran, Iran
- Height: 1.80 m (5 ft 11 in)
- Position: Central midfielder

Team information
- Current team: Sanat Mes Kerman F.C. (assistant)

Youth career
- 1999-2002: Persepolis

Senior career*
Years	Team	Apps	(Gls)
- Kaveh Tehran
- Nozhan Sari

International career
2009–2010	Iran national collegian team		

Managerial career
- 2014: Aluminium Arak (assistant)
- 2015: Kheybar Khorramabad (assistant)
- 2016: Nassaji Mazandaran (assistant)
- 2017: Naft MIS (assistant)
- 2018: Shahin Bushehr (assistant)
- 2018–2019: Sorkhpooshan Pakdasht (assistant)
- 2019: Aluminium Arak (assistant)
- 2019: Khooshe Talaei Saveh (assistant)
- 2019–2020: Nassaji Mazandaran (assistant)
- 2020–2021: Nassaji Mazandaran(manager)
- 2020–2021: Padideh (assistant)
- 2021–2022: Tractor (assistant)
- 2022-2023: Aluminium Arak (assistant)
- 2023: Nassaji Mazandaran (assistant)
- 2023-2024: Mes Kerman (assistant)
- * Club domestic league appearances and goals

Vahid Fazeli Aliabad (Persian: وحید فاضلی) Born 29 January 1982 in Tehran, Iran is an Iranian football manager who was head coach of Nassaji Mazandaran. Fazeli has a Ph.D. in exercise physiology. He joined Nassaji Mazandaran as an assistant to Mahmoud Fekri in 2019–2020, and subsequently became manager. Afterwards, he joined Padideh, and later became Zvonimir Soldo's assistant at Tractor. Subsequently, he joined Aluminium Arak as an assistant. He is currently working as a coach in Sanat Mes Kerman F.C. .
