= Hamed Shiri =

Iranian footballer

Personal information
- Full name: Hamed Shiri
- Date of birth: April 16, 1986 (age 40)
- Place of birth: Amol, Iran
- Height: 1.80 m (5 ft 11 in)
- Position: Defensive midfielder

Youth career
- 2001–2004: Arash Amol
- 2004–2006: Shamoushak

Senior career*
Years	Team	Apps	(Gls)
2004–2009	Shamoushak		
2006–2008	→ Fajr Sepasi (loan)	19	(0)
2009–2011	Nassaji Mazandaran	32	(6)
2011–2018	Saipa	160	(20)
2018–2023	Nassaji	125	(18)

International career
- Iran U23
- * Club domestic league appearances and goals as of 3 August 2017

Hamed Shiri (Persian: حامد شیری); is an Iranian Football defender, who plays for Iranian football club Nassaji in the Persian Gulf Pro League.

== Club career ==
=== Early years ===
He started his career with Arash Amol, at youth levels. He joined Shamoushak U21 in 2004 and was promoted to the first team in summer 2005 by Bahman Foroutan. In summer 2006, he was loaned to Fajr Sepasi, to spend his conscription period. Later he moved to Nassaji and spent 2 successful seasons with them.

=== Saipa ===
Shiri joined Saipa in summer 2011. He made his debut for them against Sab Qom as a starter in August 2011. He usually plays in center back role, while he could also play as right back and defensive midfielder. In May 2013 he signed a two-year contract extension, which keeps him in the club until 2015.

== Club career statistics ==
As of 15 May 2015.

Club	Division	Season	League		Hazfi Cup		Asia		Total	
Club	Division	Season	Apps	Goals	Apps	Goals	Apps	Goals	Apps	Goals
Fajr Sepasi	Pro League	2006–07	14	0	1	0	–	–	15	0
Fajr Sepasi	Pro League	2007–08	5	0	0	0	–	–	5	0
Nassaji	Division 1	2009–10	18	1	1	0	–	–	19	0
Nassaji	Division 1	2010–11	24	5	2	0	–	–	26	5
Saipa	Pro League	2011–12	11	0	1	0	–	–	12	0
Saipa	Pro League	2012–13	27	2	1	0	–	–	28	2
Saipa	Pro League	2013–14	28	1	1	0	–	–	29	1
Saipa	Pro League	2014–15	24	7	2	1	–	–	26	8
Saipa	Pro League	2015–16	23	1	1	0	–	–	24	1
Saipa	Pro League	2016–17	25	1	0	0	–	–	25	1
Saipa	Pro League	2017–18	15	2	1	0	–	–	16	2
Career totals			238	20	11	1	0	0	249	21
