= Nader Dastneshan =

Iranian footballer (1959–2021)

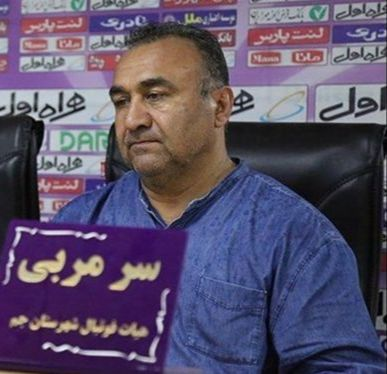
- Dastneshan in 2019

Personal information
- Full name: Nader Dastneshan
- Date of birth: 29 November 1959
- Place of birth: Qaem Shahr, Iran
- Date of death: 16 April 2021 (aged 61)
- Place of death: Qaem Shahr, Iran
- Height: 1.69 m (5 ft 6 1/2 in)
- Position: Midfielder

Senior career*
Years	Team	Apps	(Gls)
1983–1999	Nassaji Mazandaran		

Managerial career
- 2004–2005: Payam Khorasan
- 2005–2006: Shahid Ghandi Yazd
- 2006–2007: Mes Kerman
- 2007: Shahrdari Bandar Abbas
- 2007–2008: Pegah Gilan
- 2008–2009: Steel Azin
- 2009–2010: Naft Tehran
- 2010: Aboomoslem
- 2011: Sanat Sari
- 2011–2012: Shahrdari Arak
- 2012–2013: Saipa Shomal
- 2013–2015: Nassaji Mazandaran
- 2015: Machine Sazi
- 2015–2017: Sanat Naft
- 2017: Khooneh be Khooneh
- 2017–2018: Malavan
- 2018–2019: Mes Kerman
- 2019: Sepidrood
- 2020–2021: Rayka Babol
- * Club domestic league appearances and goals

Nader Dastneshan (Persian: نادر دست نشان, 29 November 1959 – 16 April 2021) was an Iranian football player and coach.

== Early life ==
Nader Dastneshan was born on 24 May 1960 in Shaahi, Mazandaran province. His father, an Azerbaijani, was from Tabriz and his mother was from Sari. He had three sisters and five brothers; he was the youngest son in the family. Initially, he played as a goalkeeper but later became a midfielder.

== Club career ==
He started his playing career with Nasaji Mazandaran and remained with the club until his retirement in 1993.

== Coaching career ==
Dastneshan studied coaching techniques in FIFA and received a degree by AFC for coaching. He became assistant coach to Carlo Soldoy, Italian head coach of Iran under-20 national football team in 1997. Iran U-20 team came fourth in AFC Asian Cup at that year. He coached in many Iranian clubs and he is known as a manager who upgraded teams to Division 1 of Iranian football but he didn't manage for more than one year in each club.

== Honours ==
Mes Kerman

- Azadegan League: 2006–07

Pegah Gilan

- Hazfi Cup: 2007–08 (Runner-up)

Steel Azin

- Azadegan League: 2008–09

Naft Tehran

- Azadegan League: 2009–10

Sanat Naft

- Azadegan League: 2015–16

== Death ==
Dastneshan died one week after being hospitalised due to COVID-19. He was 61 years old.
