= F.C. Nassaji Mazandaran =

Iranian association football club

Nassaji Mazandaran
- Full name: Football Club Nassaji Mazandaran
- Nicknames: Mazandaran Tigers (Persian: ببرهای مازندران, Babrhay-e Mazandaran)
- Founded: May 3, 1959; 67 years ago
- Ground: Vatani Stadium
- Capacity: 15,000
- Owner: Reza Haddadian
- Chairman: Shahab Zandi
- Manager: Saeid Daghighi
- League: Persian Gulf Pro League
- 2025–26: Azadegan League, 1st of 18 (champions)
- Website: fcnassaji.ir
Home colours	Away colours

Football Club Nassaji Mazandaran (Persian: باشگاه فوتبال نساجی مازندران, Bāšgāh-e Futbāl-e Nassāji-ye Māzandarān) is an Iranian football club based in Qaem Shahr, Mazandaran. They currently compete in the Persian Gulf Pro League.

Nassaji has one of the highest average attendances in Iran. Nassaji is also the oldest club from the Caspian region of Iran and one of the oldest in all of Iran. One of the most important honors of Nassaji Mazandaran is a championship title in Iranian Hazfi Cup and a runner-up title in Iranian Super Cup.

== History ==
=== Establishment ===
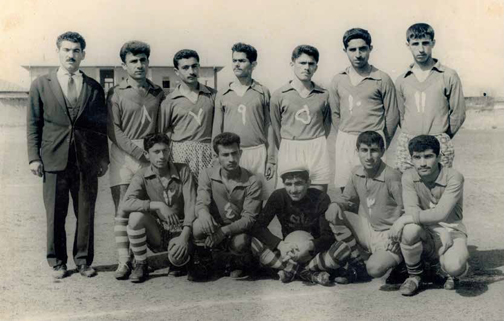
Nassaji lineup in 1959, which is considered the first lineup of this team.

Nassaji Mazandaran Company established the club in Qaem Shahr in 1959. Nassaji entered the Qods Cup in 1988 and soon after they entered the top division Azadegan League in 1991 and remained a strong competitor in that division until 1995.

=== Recent years ===
Nassaji stayed in 2nd division until 2001 and when Iranian Football Federation decided to start a professional league, the Azadegan league became the second highest league in Iran. In 2004 Nassaji was relegated to 2nd Division but they were promoted back to the Azadegan League at the end of the 2005–06 season. On 3 August 2006 Nasser Hejazi signed as head-coach of Nassaji on a one-year deal for the 2006–07 season.

In the 2013–14 season, Nassaji had their closest call with promotion to the Persian Gulf Pro League since their relegation from the top flight in 1995, the team finished third in Group A which was one place out of a promotion play-off spot. The following season Nassaji again finished third and was two points out of a promotion play-off spot.

=== Persian Gulf Pro League ===
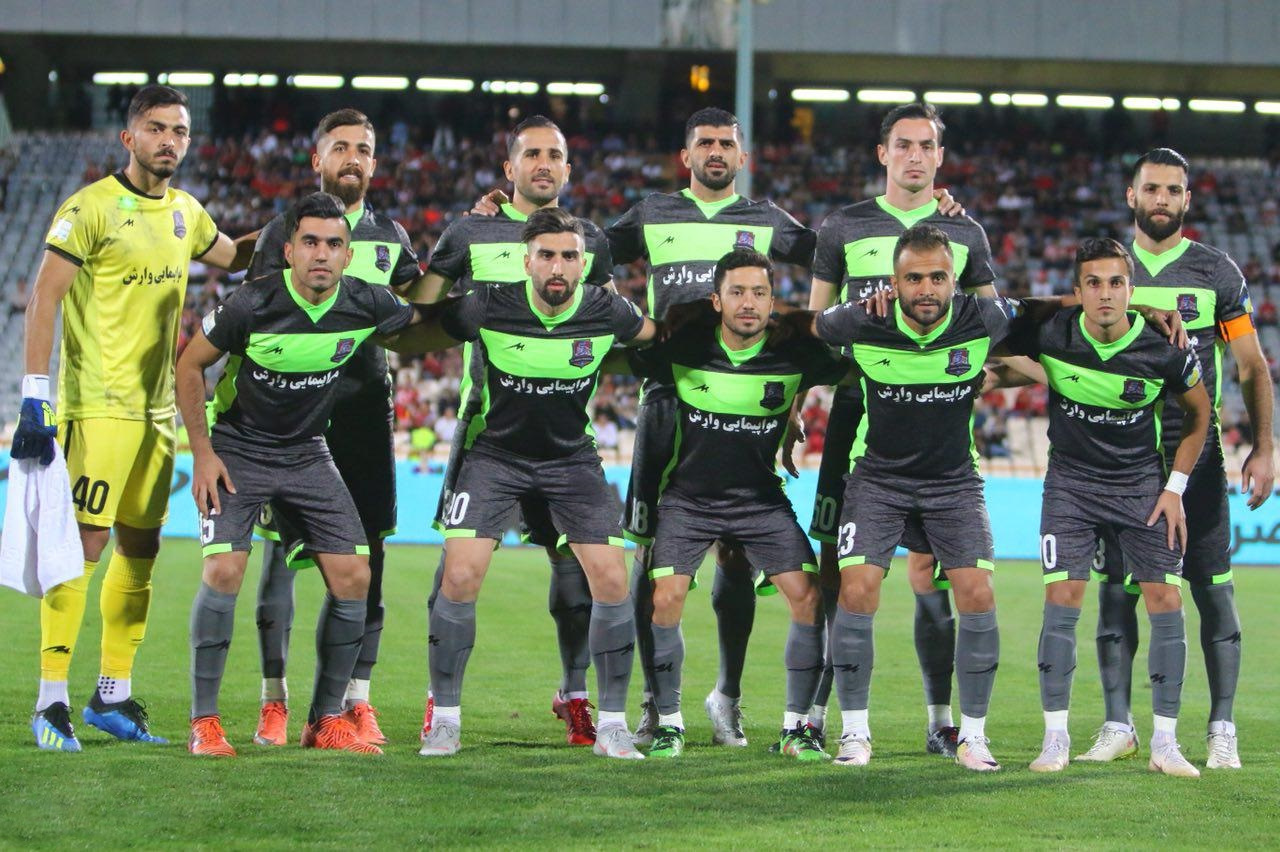
Nassaji team in League 2018-19

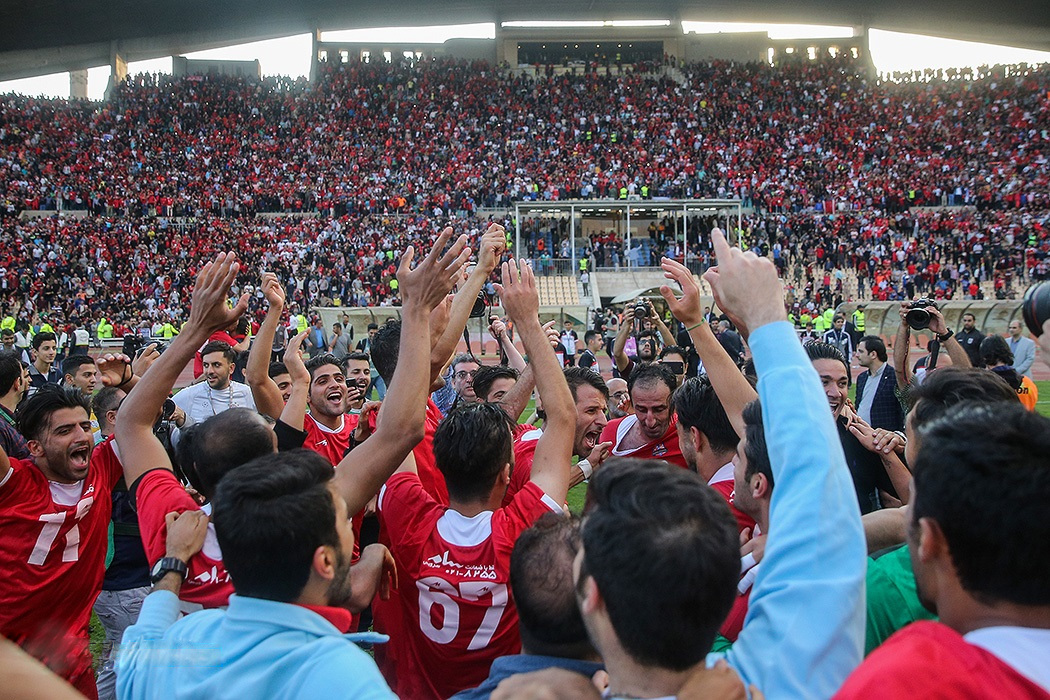
Nassaji team Supported fans

On 29 April 2018, after a win against Rah Ahan, Nassaji finished in second place in the Azadegan League and were promoted to the Persian Gulf Pro League for the first time.

=== AFC Champions League debut ===
On 27 October 2022, Nassaji won the 2021–22 Hazfi Cup which saw them qualified to their first ever AFC Champions League appearance. On 18 September 2023 in their debut 2023–24 AFC Champions League group stage fixtures, Nassaji won 2–0 against Mumbai City of India with goals coming from Ehsan Hosseini and Mohammad Reza Azadi.

== Facilities ==
Since the club was created, Nassaji has trained and played its home games at Vatani Stadium, which was built in the 1940s. After the Islamic Revolution of 1979, the stadium was expanded to hold 15,000 people.

== Stadium ==
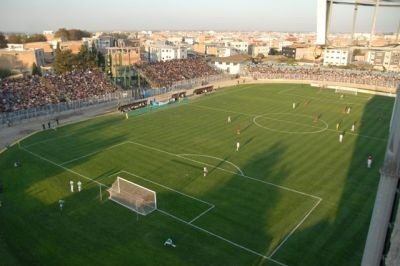
Vatani Stadium

Since its establishment in 1959, the Nassaji Mazandaran has conducted its training sessions and home matches at the Vatani Stadium. The stadium was inaugurated in 1946 in the city of Qaem Shahr, and employees of the Nassaji Mazandaran Factory would play football there after their work shifts.

Currently, Shahid Vatani Stadium has a capacity of 15,000 spectators. For many matches, even the walls around the stands and the corridors are filled with fans. Due to the limited seating, several thousand spectators are often unable to attend. This stadium is considered one of the oldest in Iran.

== Seasons ==
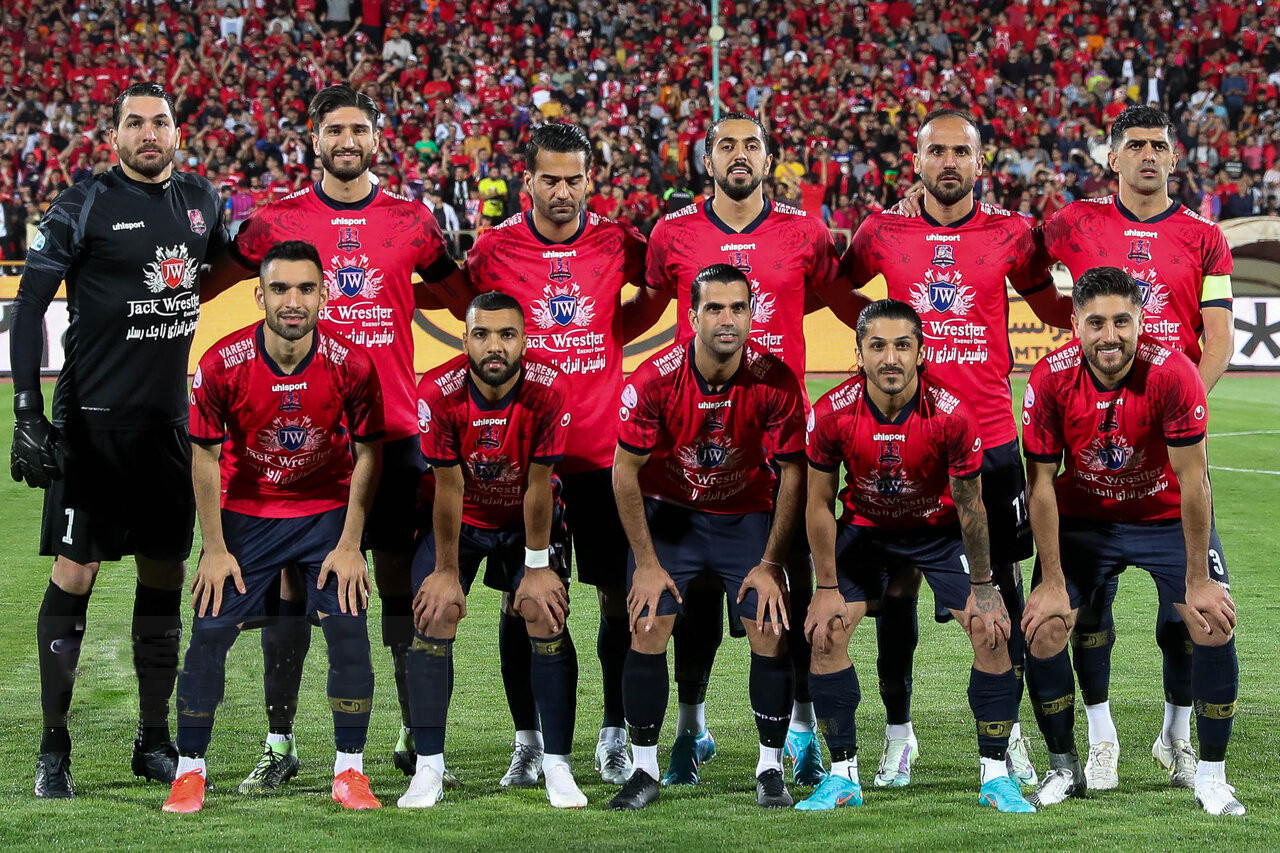
FC Nassaji Mazandaran (2022)

The table below chronicles the achievements of Nassaji Mazandaran since 1989.

Year	Division	Position	Hazfi Cup
1989–90	Qods	3rd	Not held
1990–91	2nd Division	3rd	1/16 Final
1991–92	Azadegan	7th	First round
1992–93	Azadegan	7th	Not held
1993–94	Azadegan	6th	1/8 Final
1994–95	Azadegan	10th	First round
1995–96	2nd Division	4th	Second round
1996–97	2nd Division	8th	Second round
1997–98	2nd Division	7th	Not held
1998–99	2nd Division	5th	1/4 Final
1999–00	2nd Division	6th	Third round
2000–01	2nd Division	4th	1/4 Final
2001–02	Azadegan	4th	Third round
2002–03	Azadegan	13th	Second round
2003–04	Azadegan	16th	Second round
2004–05	2nd Division	3rd	First round
2005–06	2nd Division	2nd	1/16 Final
2006–07	Azadegan	6th	First round
2007–08	Azadegan	5th	1/16 Final
2008–09	Azadegan	12th	1/16 Final
2009–10	Azadegan	7th	1/16 Final
2010–11	Azadegan	4th	Third round
2011–12	Azadegan	5th	Second round
2012–13	Azadegan	8th	First round
2013–14	Azadegan	3rd	Third round
2014–15	Azadegan	3rd	Fourth round
2015–16	Azadegan	8th	did not contest
2016–17	Azadegan	10th	1/16 Final
2017–18	Azadegan	2nd	1/8 Final
2018–19	PGPL	10th	1/8 Final
2019–20	PGPL	9th	1/16 Final
2020–21	PGPL	12th	1/8 Final
2021–22	PGPL	12th	Winner
2022–23	PGPL	13th	Semifinal
2023–24	PGPL	12th	1/16 Final
2024–25	PGPL	15th	1/4 Final
2025–26	Azadegan League	Champions	Round of 16
2026–27	PGPL		

== Honours ==
- Hazfi Cup
  - Winners (1): 2021–22
- Iranian Super Cup
  - Runners-up (1): 2022
- Azadegan League
  - Winners (1): 2025–26
  - Runners-up (1): 2017–18

League Mazandaran 1 cup wins

== Players ==
=== First-team squad ===
As of 8 October 2026

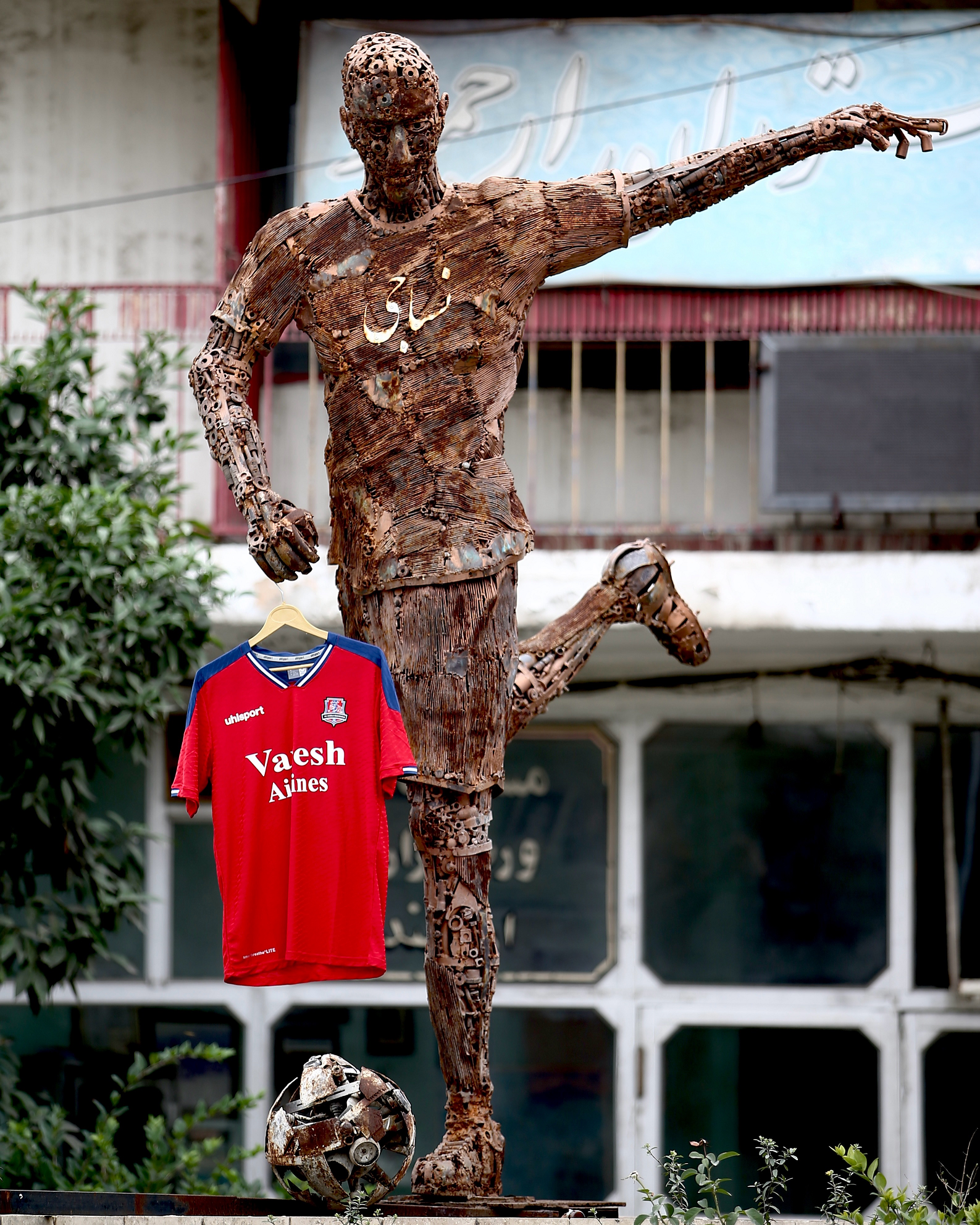
Metal football player sculpture holding Nassaji Mazandaran jersey in Qaemshahr

Note: Flags indicate national team as defined under FIFA eligibility rules; some limited exceptions apply. Players may hold more than one non-FIFA nationality.

No.	Pos.	Nation	Player
1	GK	IRI	Alireza Jafarpour
2	DF	IRI	Abolfazl Koohi ^{U21}
3	DF	IRI	Hooman Rabizadeh
5	DF	IRI	Seyed Reza Darvishi ^{U23}
6	MF	IRI	Amirmasoud Sarabadani
8	MF	IRI	Afshin Sadeghi ^{U23}
9	FW	IRI	Javad Aghaeipour
10	MF	IRI	Ahmadreza Mohammadnejad ^{U25}
11	MF	IRI	Amirreza Sheikhirad ^{U23}
12	GK	IRI	Alireza Akrami ^{U21}
14	MF	IRI	Pouria Rezazadeh ^{U23}
16	DF	IRI	Abolfazl Kazemi ^{U19}
17	DF	IRI	Alireza Arasteh ^{U21}
18	MF	IRI	Omid Fahmi
19	MF	IRI	Ario Mahdavikia ^{U19}
20	MF	IRI	Ali Asghar Aarabi
22	GK	IRI	Omid Amiri ^{U23}

No.	Pos.	Nation	Player
23	MF	IRI	Sadegh Albousabih (captain)
24	MF	IRI	Ali Nasiri
25	MF	IRI	Navid Komar
26	DF	IRI	Behrouz Norouzifard
27	FW	IRI	Mehdi Tahmasebi ^{U23}
32	MF	IRI	Radin Mirnejad ^{U17}
37	DF	IRI	Yaghoub Barajeh ^{U21} (on loan from Persepolis)
38	DF	IRI	Mohammad Amin Balesh ^{U25}
68	DF	IRI	Seyed Reza Darvishi ^{U23}
69	MF	IRI	Saleh Mohammadi ^{U23}
70	MF	IRI	Mohammad Amin Khosravi ^{U21}
72	DF	IRI	Mohammad Hosseinzadehfard ^{U23}
77	FW	IRI	Fardin Najafi
87	MF	IRI	Moayed Eimery ^{U19}
91	MF	IRI	Vihan Razi ^{U19}
88	FW	IRI	Faraz Emamali
99	MF	IRI	Kourosh Ezhdehakosh ^{U19} (on loan from Persepolis)

==== Loan list ====
Note: Flags indicate national team as defined under FIFA eligibility rules; some limited exceptions apply. Players may hold more than one non-FIFA nationality.

No.	Pos.	Nation	Player
—	DF	IRI	Mohammad Hossein Rafiei (at Malavan)
—	FW	IRI	Alireza Maleki (at Kheybar Khorramabad)

== Staff ==
=== Current coach staff ===
Position	Staff
Head coach	(Iran) Saeid Daghighi
Assistant coach	(Iran) Hamid Abdollahi (Iran) Davoud Seyed-Abbasi (Iran) Issa Parto (Iran) Sina Dastneshan
Goalkeeper coach	(Iran) Mehdi Sabeti
Fitness coach	(Iran) Amin Mirzaei
Tactical analyst	(Iran) Babak Moradi (Iran) Amir Mohebbi
Team Manager	(Iran) Pouya Seifpanahi

== Head coaches ==
- (Iran) Rahim Dastneshan (1983–94)
- (Iran) Fereydoon Asgarzadeh (1994)
- (Iran) Abolfazl Mozdastan (1994–95)
- (Iran) Rahim Dastneshan (1995–96)
- (Iran) Nader Dastneshan (1996–02)
- (Iran) Hossein Mesgar Saravi (2002–04)
- (Iran) Rahim Dastneshan (2004–05)
- (Iran) Ebrahim Talebi (2005–06)
- (Iran) Nasser Hejazi (2006– 07)
- (Iran) Morteza Sadeghi (2007)
- (Iran) Hossein Ghazal Seflou (2007)
- (Iran) Ebrahim Talebi (2007–08)
- (Iran) Morteza Sadeghi (2008)
- (Iran) Hassan Khourdestan (2008)
- (Iran) Morteza Sadeghi (2008–2009)
- (Iran) Rahim Dastneshan (2009)
- (Iran) Esmaeil Esmaeili (2009)
- (Iran) Nader Dastneshan (2009–2010)
- (Iran) Reza Forouzani (2010)
- (Iran) Farhad Kouchakzadeh (2010)
- (Iran) Yahya Golmohammadi (2010–11)
- (Iran) Esmaeil Esmaeili (2011–13)
- (Iran) Younes Geraeili (2013)
- (Iran) Nader Dastneshan (2013–15)
- (Portugal) Paulo Alves (2015)
- (Iran) Kourosh Mousavi (2015–16)
- (Iran) Mahmoud Fekri (2016)
- (Iran) Hossein Mesgar Saravi (2016–17)
- (Iran) Saket Elhami (2017)
- (Iran) Hossein Mesgar Saravi (2017)
- (Iran) Mehdi Pashazadeh (2017)
- (Iran) Davoud Mahabadi (2017–18)
- (Iran) Javad Nekounam (2018)
- (Iran) Majid Jalali (2019)
- (Iran) Mohammad Reza Mohajeri (2019–20)
- (Iran) Mahmoud Fekri (2020)
- (Iran) Vahid Fazeli (2020–21)
- (Iran) Majid Jalali (2021)
- (Iran) Saket Elhami (2021–22)
- (Iran) Esmaeil Esmaeili (2022)
- (Iran) Hamid Motahari (2022–23)
- (Spain) Carlos Inarejos (2023)
- (Iran) Mehdi Rahmati (2023)
- (Iran) Vahid Rezaei (2023)
- (Spain) Lucas Alcaraz (2023–2024)
- (Iran) Saket Elhami (2024–2025)
- (Iran) Mostafa Sedaghat (2025)
- (Serbia) Savo Milosevic (2025)
- (Iran) Saket Elhami (2025)
- (Iran) Mohammad Reza Mohajeri (2025)
- (Iran) Faraz Kamalvand (2025–2026)
- (Iran) Reza Enayati (2026)
- (Iran) Mojtaba Hosseini (2026)
- (Iran) Saeid Daghighi (2026–Present)

== Sponsorship ==
=== Shirt sponsors and manufacturers ===
Period	Kit Manufacturer	Shirt Sponsor
2014–15	(Germany) Uhlsport	Samsung Group; Kosar FCI; MCI; Yamaha Corporation/ Varesh Airlines; Dariush Grand Hotel
2016–17	(Germany) Uhlsport	Samsung Group; Kosar FCI; MCI; Yamaha Corporation/ Varesh Airlines; Dariush Grand Hotel
2018–	(Iran) Majid	Samsung Group; Kosar FCI; MCI; Yamaha Corporation/ Varesh Airlines; Dariush Grand Hotel

== Managers ==
=== Owners ===
- (Iran) Kourosh Rahmani, (Iran) Amir Shahrokh Salamian, (Iran) Homayoun Imenpour, (Iran) Reza Nasrollahpour (2007–2009)
- (Iran) Mehdi Parham (2009–2013)
- (Iran) Hossein Ghasemnejhad (2013–2014)
- (Iran) Mehdi Parham (2014–2017)
- (Iran) Mehdi Parham, (Iran) Farhad Sanieifar (2017)
- (Iran) Farhad Sanieifar (2017–2018)
- (Iran) Farhad Sanieifar, (Iran) Reza Haddadian (2018–2019)
- (Iran) Reza Haddadian (2019–Present)

=== Chairmans ===
- (Iran) Kourosh Rahmani (2004–2007)
- (Iran) Abed Mahzoun (2007)
- (Iran) Kourosh Rahmani (2007–2009)
- (Iran) Mohammad Ali Ghanbari (2009)
- (Iran) Mehdi Parham (2009–2010)
- (Iran) Mohammad Hassan Heydarzadeh (2010)
- (Iran) Saeed Azari (2010–2011)
- (Iran) Mohammad Hassan Heydarzadeh (2011)
- (Iran) Yousef Daftari (2011)
- (Iran) Mohammad Hassan Heydarzadeh (2011)
- (Iran) Ahmad Sahadatmand (2011–2013)
- (Iran) Mohammad Hassan Heydarzadeh (2013)
- (Iran) Mohammad Ali Ghanbari (2013)
- (Iran) Mohammad Reza Ranjbar (2013)
- (Iran) Mohammad Ali Ghanbari (2013–2014)
- (Iran) Sadegh Dorudgar (2014–2015)
- (Iran) Mohammad Hassan Heydarzadeh (2015–2016)
- (Iran) Hamed Ebrahimi (2016)
- (Iran) Abdolhamid Ramezani (2016–2017)
- (Iran) Ali Amiri (2017–2019)
- (Iran) Mohammad Kazemi (2019–2019)
- (Iran) Mohammad Ali Ghanbari (2019)
- (Iran) Ali Reza Asadi (2019)
- (Iran) Izad Seyfollahpour (2019–2020)
- (Iran) Ali Amiri (2020–2021)
- (Iran) Izad Seyfollahpour (2021–2023)
- (Iran) Sadegh Dorudgar (2023)
- (Iran) Hamid Reza Bayandorian (2023–2024)
- (Iran) Ali Khatir (2024–2025)
- (Iran) Hamid Reza Bayandorian (2025)
- (Iran) Shahab Zandi (2025–Present)

== Individual records ==
=== All Top Appearances ===
#	Name	Nationality	Position	Apps
1	Hamed Shiri	Iran	Defender	185
2	Hossein Zamehran	Iran	Midfielder	164
3	Mehrdad Abdi	Iran	Midfielder	128
4	Saeid Gholamalibeygi	Iran	Midfielder	123
5	Mohammad Abbaszadeh	Iran	Striker	122
6	Ayoub Kalantari	Iran	Midfielder	109
7	Hassan Najafi	Iran	Defender	106
8	Amir Mehdi Janmaleki	Iran	Defender	100
9	Karim Eslami	Iran	Striker	91
10	Mojtaba Mamashli	Iran	Midfielder	91
11	Alireza Haghighi	Iran	Goalkeeper	88
12	Saber Hardani	Iran	Midfielder	86
13	Mohammad Mehdi Nazari	Iran	Forward	84
14	Mohammad Ghaseminejad	Iran	Midfielder	72
15	Ali Shojaei	Iran	Midfielder	71

=== All Top Scorers ===
#	Name	Nationality	Position	Goals
1	Mohammad Abbaszadeh	Iran	Striker	66
2	Hamed Shiri	Iran	Defender	26
3	Hamid Kazemi	Iran	Forward	16
4	Karim Eslami	Iran	Striker	15
5	Mojtaba Ramezani	Iran	Midfielder	14
6	Mojtaba Mamashli	Iran	Defender	14
7	Ayoub Kalantari	Iran	Midfielder	12
8	Mohammad Mehdi Nazari	Iran	Midfielder	12
9	Mohammad Reza Azadi	Iran	Forward	12
10	Hassan Najafi	Iran	Defender	10
11	Hossein Zamehran	Iran	Midfielder	10
12	Rahman Jafari	Iran	Forward	9
13	Mehrdad Abdi	Iran	Midfielder	9
14	Shahin Majidi	Iran	Midfielder	7
15	Mohammad Ghaseminejad	Iran	Midfielder	7

=== Club captains ===
Name	Nat	Position	Captaincy
Nader Dastneshan	(Iran)	Midfielder	1986–1999
Aziz Zare	(Iran)	Midfielder	1999–2002
Morteza Arabnejad	(Iran)	Defender	2002–2003
Nasrollah Nourbakhsh	(Iran)	Midfielder	2003–2004
Farid Yaghoubnia	(Iran)	Defender	2004–2009
Hadi Khodadadi	(Iran)	Forward	2009–2010
Mohsen Pourhaji	(Iran)	Midfielder	2009–2012
Fereydoon Fazli	(Iran)	Forward	2011
Meysam Khodashenas	(Iran)	Midfielder	2012–2013
Mohsen Rahimi	(Iran)	Midfielder	2013–2014
Mohsen Hosseini	(Iran)	Defender	2014
Issa Parto	(Iran)	Defender	2014–2015
Meysam Baou	(Iran)	Midfielder	2015–2016
Meysam Khodashenas	(Iran)	Midfielder	2016
Mohammad Abbaszadeh	(Iran)	Forward	2016–2017
Morteza Gholamalitabar	(Iran)	Defender	2017
Mohammad Abbaszadeh	(Iran)	Forward	2017–2020
Hamed Shiri	(Iran)	Defender	2020–2023
Masoud Shojaei	(Iran)	Midfielder	2021–2022
Mehrdad Abdi	(Iran)	Midfielder	2023–2024
Mohammad Abbaszadeh	(Iran)	Forward	2024
Hossein Zamehran	(Iran)	Midfielder	2024–2025
Mojtaba Lotfi	(Iran)	Defender	2025–2026
Mohammad Abbaszadeh	(Iran)	Forward	2026
Sadegh Albousabih	(Iran)	Midfielder	2026–

== Supporters ==
- Behdad Salimi (Olympic gold medallist)
- Hanif Omranzadeh (Footballer)
- Mohsen Bengar (Footballer)
- Shoja Khalilzadeh (Footballer)

== See also ==
- Persian Gulf Pro League
