= Ali Fathollahzadeh =

Iranian football executive

Ali Fathollahzadeh khoei
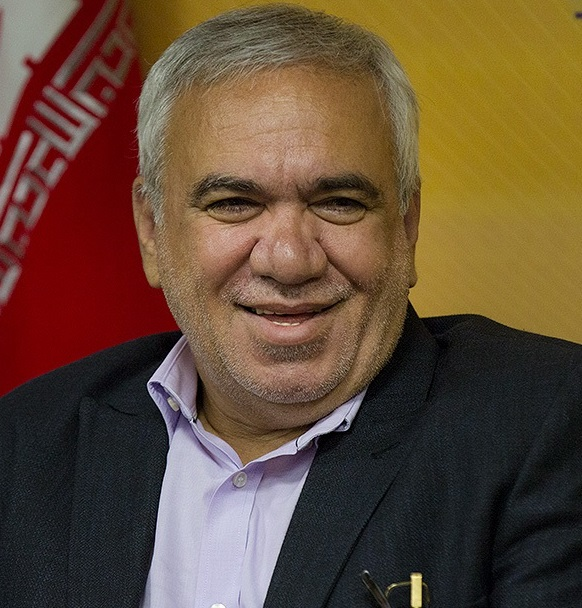
- Born: 9 January 1959 (age 67); Khoy, Iran
- Occupations: Football, arts administrator Businessman

Ali Fathollahzadeh Khoei (Persian: علی فتح‌‌الله‌‌زاده خویی, born 9 January 1959 in Khoy, West Azerbaijan Province) is an Iranian businessman and football administrator, who was formerly the chairman of the Esteghlal F.C. He is also the formerly managing-director of Esteghlal Javan Newspaper.

== Esteghlal F.C. ==
He was elected chairman of the Esteghlal on 10 May 1996 and was in office until his term ended on 10 May 2003. On 1 May 2007, he was reelected; but resigned on 15 September 2008 due to poor results in the Iran Pro League. He returned to the club after reelection on 1 June 2010 as chairman.

=== Trophies won by club during presidency ===
- Iranian Football League (2): 2000–01, 2012–13
- Hazfi Cup (4): 1999–00, 2001–02, 2007–08, 2011–12
- Iranian Super Cup (1):2022
- AFC Champions League: Runner-up (1): 1999 & Third place (1): 2002

== Electoral history ==
Year	Election	Votes	%	Rank	Notes
2003	City Council of Tehran	31,633	6.00	26th	Lost
2008	Parliament	92,335	5.30	69th	Lost
