= Reza Haddadian =

Iranian entrepreneur and sports director

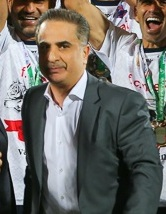
- Haddadian in 2022
- Born: Reza Haddadian; 3 March 1976 (age 50); Sari, Mazandaran, Iran
- Education: Architecture
- Occupations: entrepreneur, Investor and businessman
- Known for: Owner of Varesh Airlines and F.C. Nassaji Mazandaran
- Title: His Excellency
- Website: vareshair.ir

Reza Haddadian (Persian: رضا حدادیان, born 3 March 1976) is an Iranian Entrepreneur and sports director.

He owns the F.C. Nassaji Mazandaran and Varesh Airlines. He is also a member of the Iranian Fencing Federation, a member of the Iranian Airlines Association and Member of the Board of Directors of the Iranian Chamber of Commerce.

== Fencing activities ==
Reza HaddadianIn in Civil Aviation Association

Reza Haddadian is also a former fencing champion and was the head of the fencing board of Tehran province for several terms, but he resigned from this position due to his busy schedule. Also, he was a candidate for the presidency of Iran Fencing Federation.
