= Saket Elhami =

Iranian football manager

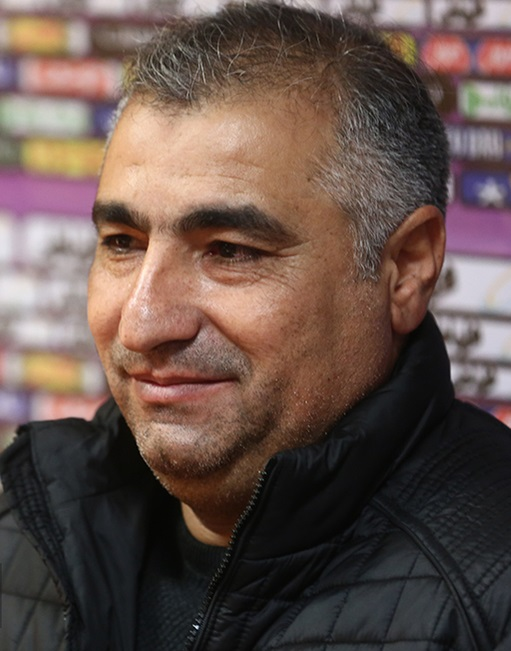
- Elhami in 2020

Personal information
- Date of birth: 24 May 1971 (age 55)
- Place of birth: Ardabil, Iran
- Position: Midfielder

Team information
- Current team: Paykan (manager)

Senior career*
Years	Team	Apps	(Gls)
- Esteghlal Ahvaz
- Keshavarz
- Tractor
1993–1994	PAS		
1994–1996	Bahman		
1996–1997	PAS		
1997–1998	Polyacryl		

Managerial career
- 2004–2006: Rah Ahan (assistant)
- 2006–2007: Esteghlal (assistant)
- 2007–2008: Esteghlal (assistant)
- 2008–2009: Etka Golestan
- 2010–2011: Mes Kerman (assistant)
- 2011: Sanati Kaveh
- 2012: Etka Golestan
- 2013: Saba Qom (assistant)
- 2014–2015: Paykan (assistant)
- 2016: Saba Qom (assistant)
- 2017: Nassaji Mazandaran (assistant)
- 2017: Nassaji Mazandaran
- 2018–2019: Padideh (assistant)
- 2019: Tractor (assistant)
- 2019: Atrak Bojnourd (assistant)
- 2019: Machine Sazi (assistant)
- 2019–2020: Tractor
- 2021–2022: Nassaji Mazandaran
- 2022–2023: Havadar
- 2023–2024: Mes Rafsanjan
- 2024–2025: Nassaji Mazandaran
- 2025: Nassaji Mazandaran (academy manager)
- 2025: Nassaji Mazandaran
- 2026–: Paykan
- * Club domestic league appearances and goals

Saket Elhami (Persian: ساکت الهامی; born 24 May 1971) is an Iranian football manager and a former player who started his career as the manager of Persian Gulf Pro League club Nassaji from 2017.

Elhami was born in Ardabil, Iran on 24 May 1971.

In May 2022, he was removed as the manager of Nassaji. In April 2022, the team won the Iran’s Hazfi Cup under his guidance. He is later appointed as the new manager of Havadar club.

In June 2023, he was named as the coach of the Iranian top flight club Mes Rafsanjan replacing Mohammad Rabiei. In April 2025, he returned to Nassaji for the remainder of the 2024-2025 Iran’s Persian Gulf Professional League.

He played for PAS, Esteghlal Ahvaz, and Tractor.

== Managerial statistics ==
As of 10 November 2022

Team	From	To	Record				
Team	From	To	G	W	D	L	Win %
Nassaji	January 2017	February 2017	3	0	1	2	0.00
Tractor	December 2019	September 2020	21	12	5	4	57.14
Nassaji	March 2021	March 2022	46	18	15	13	39.13
Havadar	June 2022	until present	33	10	12	11	30.30

== Honours ==
=== Manager ===
Tractor

- Hazfi Cup: 2019–20

Nassaji

- Hazfi Cup: 2021–22
