= Vatani Stadium =

Association football stadium in Iran

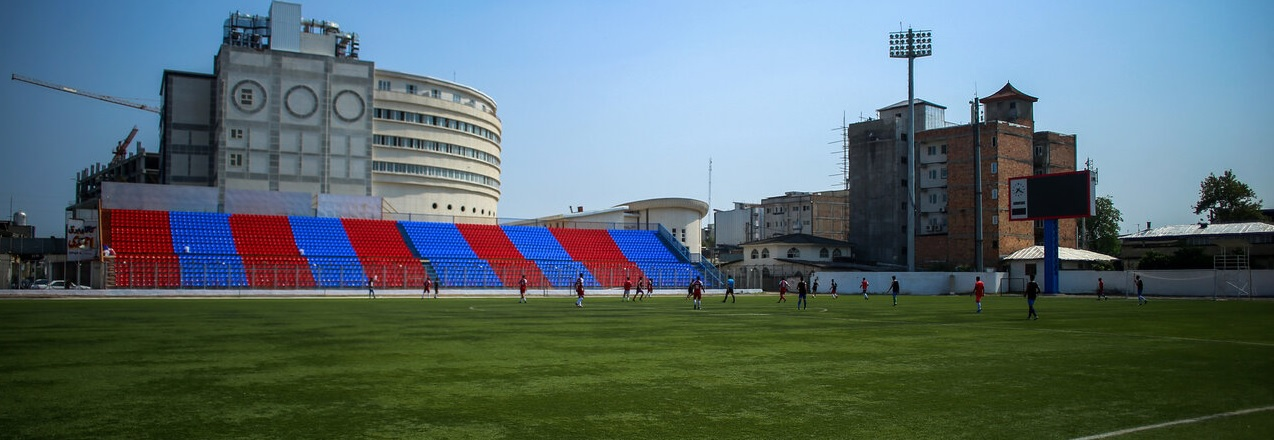
- Vatani Stadium in 2019
- Interactive map of Vatani Stadium
- Full name: Vatani Stadium
- Location: Qa'em Shahr, Iran
- Coordinates: 36.466219°N 52.861079°E
- Owner: Iran Physical Education Organization
- Capacity: 15,000 (Football)
- Surface: Grass

Construction
- Opened: 9 May 1946

Tenant
- Nassaji Mazandaran

Vatani Stadium (Persian: ورزشگاه وطنی; Vârzeshgah-e Vâtâni) is a multi-use stadium in Qa'em Shahr, Iran. It is currently used for football matches and is the home stadium of Persian Gulf Pro League team Nassaji Mazandaran. The stadium holds 15,000 people.

== Background ==
The location of Shahid Vatani Stadium is situated near Sari Street in the city of Qaem Shahr. After the occupation of Iran during World War II, it was initially turned into a military base by the forces of the Soviet Union. Over time, they created a football field in one corner of the base for their soldiers to engage in sports activities. Following the withdrawal of Soviet forces on 9 May 1946, the site was transformed into a stadium. Employees of the textile factory used to play football at the stadium—originally named Shahna, like the factory—after their work shifts.

Since 1959, the stadium became the home ground for the Nassaji football team. After the 1979 Revolution, the stadium was briefly renamed Eftekhari and then changed to Shahid Vatani.

=== Renovation and Reconstruction ===
Coinciding with the return of the Nassaji team to the Persian Gulf Pro League in May 2018, this stadium was equipped and renovated under the orders of the Minister of Sports at the time. The renovation was completed by 2019, which included refurbishing the stadium's stands and locker rooms.

== Specifications ==
The stadium's playing field has natural grass, and the spectator stands are close to the field. Surrounding the grass is a six-lane track and field track made of artificial turf, which was previously tartan. A special section for commentators and a VIP area have been constructed opposite the main stands.

=== Capacity ===
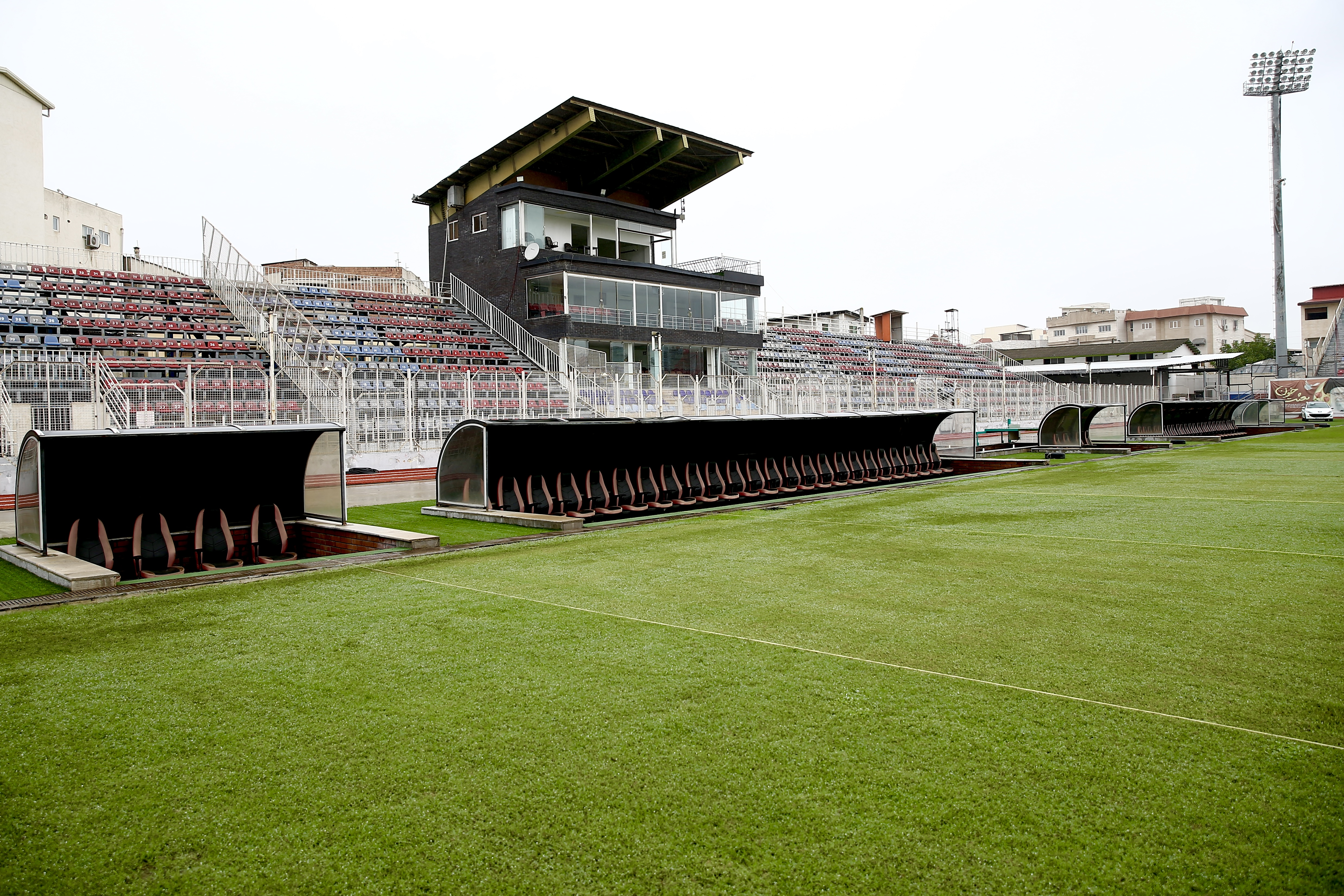
ورزشگاه شهید وطنی

Previously, the stadium had a modest set of stands, with the two teams' locker rooms located beneath them. A VIP section was also positioned at the center, level with the two stands. Over time, the capacity of the stadium was increased to 15,000 spectators.
