= Qaem Shahr =

City in Mazandaran province, Iran

Qaem Shahr Persian: قائم‌شهر
- City
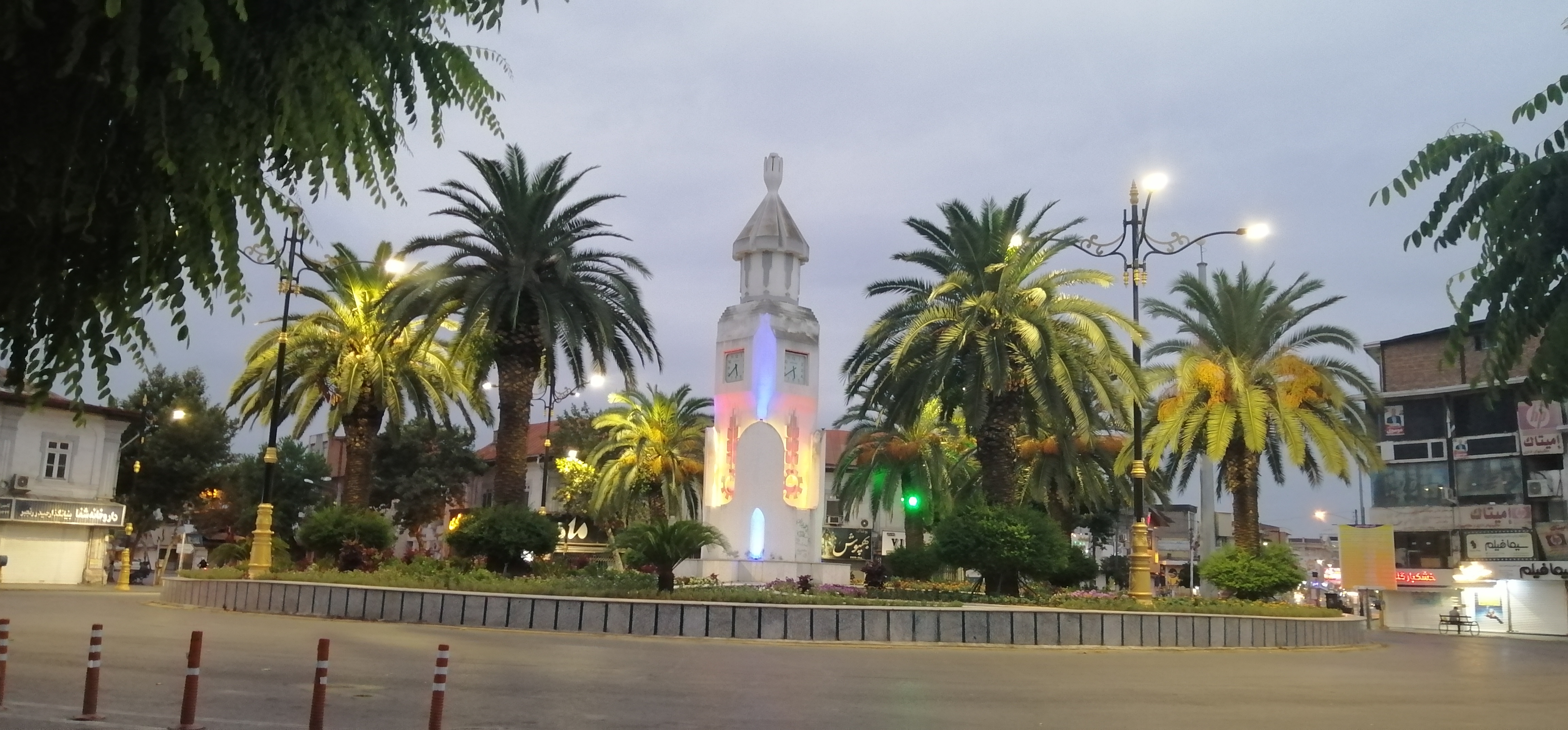
- Qaemshahr's city center in 2022 (Taleghani Square)

- Location within Iran
- Coordinates: 36°27′49″N 52°51′29″E
- Country: Iran
- Province: Mazandaran
- County: Qaem Shahr
- District: Central

Area
  - City: 27 km^{2} (10 sq mi)

Population (2016)
  - City: 204,953
  - Density: 7,600/km^{2} (20,000/sq mi)
  - Urban: 247,953
- Time zone: UTC+3:30 (IRST)
- Website: www.ghaemshahr.ir

Qaem Shahr (Persian: قائم‌شهر;) (Note: Also romanized as Qā’em Shahr; formerly known as Shāhi (شاهی)) which was named Shahi before 1979 Revolution) is a city in the Central District of Qaem Shahr County, Mazandaran province, Iran, serving as capital of both the county and the district. Originally known as Šâhi (Shahi), the name was used until the Iranian Revolution in 1979 when the city acquired its current name.

Qaem Shahr is divided into two natural topographic regions: the plain and the foothills of the Alborz. It is at an elevation of 51 meters above sea level. Qaem Shahr has a humid subtropical climate. In most years, winter contributes to half of the city's annual rainfall, while summer is the least rainy season. The average annual precipitation in Qaem Shahr is approximately 850 millimeters. Based on the latest accurate geographic data, Qaem Shahr is considered one of the largest cities in Northern Iran.

The people of Qaem Shahr belong to the Tabari ethnic group. They speak the Mazandarani language. Specifically, they communicate in the Qaem Shahr dialect, one of the dialects of the Mazandarani language. Most residents of Qaem Shahr are officially Muslim and adhere to the Twelver Shia Islam.

The history of human settlement in Qaem Shahr, which also includes the ancient cities of Chamno and Tooji, dates back to the Iron Age. Archaeological excavations in Qaem Shahr have uncovered 5,000-year-old pottery and stone tools. During the Safavid period, the city garnered greater attention.

Its initial foundation as Aliabad took place during the Qajar dynasty. However, the era of significant growth and development for Qaem Shahr traces back to the Pahlavi dynasty. During this period, construction of the Trans-Iranian Railway began in Qaem Shahr, and various factories and facilities were established in the city.

In September 1935, by a decree of the Council of Ministers, the city's name was changed to Shahi. Following the end of World War II, Qaem Shahr's development continued, making it a hub for population settlement. During the 1979 Iranian Revolution, the name Shahi was changed to Qaem Shahr.

Qaem Shahr holds significant strategic geographic importance as it connects Tehran to the northern and northeastern regions of Iran via two different routes: Firuzkuh Road and Haraz Road. It is reported that five million travelers annually commute through Firuzkuh Road to Qaem Shahr, which is linked to a maritime border through the port of Babolsar. This city is recognized as one of Iran's tourism centers, offering a variety of tourist attractions. The clock tower in Taleghani Square serves as the symbol of Qaem Shahr.

Until 1945, Qaem Shahr was part of Sari County. With the establishment of Shahi County that year, the city became its administrative center. Historically, regions like Shahmirzad District, Firuzkuh County, Savadkuh County, Juybar County, and Simorgh County were originally sections of Qaem Shahr before being designated as independent counties. As of the 2016 census, Qaem Shahr's population was approximately 204,953, making it the most densely populated city in Mazandaran Province and northern Iran.

== Etymology ==
Chamno: Also known as Jemanan, it consists of two parts: "Chamn" (grass) and "o" (water in the Tabari language). It referred to an area characterized by lush grasslands and water. Historical records of Tabaristan mention that during the 6th century AH, a river flowed through Chamno. Its bridge was repaired at the personal expense of Shah Ghazi Rustam (460 to 536 AH), the ruler of Tabaristan, to prevent its water from going to waste. Ibn Isfandiyar also frequently mentioned Chamno in the History of Tabaristan. Today, there is a neighborhood called Jemanan in Qaem Shahr.

Toji: The origin of the name for the city Toji or Triji remains unclear but may derive from the Toji River located south of Qaem Shahr

Shahi: In the early 1300s (solar calendar), the newly established city of Shahi was founded by order of Reza Shah, his birthplace, and Aliabad was renamed Shahi.

Qaem Shahr: Following the 1979 Revolution, the city was renamed to Qaem Shahr.

== Demographics ==
=== Population ===
In 1951, Qaem Shahr's population was around 18,000, growing to 123,684 in 1991. At the time of the 2006 National Census, the city's population was 174,246 in 48,055 households. The following census in 2011 counted 196,050 people in 60,347 households. The 2016 census measured the population of the city as 204,953 people in 68,407 households.

=== History ===
According to existing evidence, including religious sites such as Imamzadeh Yousef Reza and the tomb of the scholar and jurist Sheikh Tabarsi, Qaem Shahr reflects a long-standing history of civilization and culture dating back to before the 6th century AH.

In the city of Shahi, a weekly bazaar was held every Wednesday. On these days, locals from nearby districts, as well as merchants from surrounding villages and even other cities, brought their goods and products to this market for sale. Over time, this bazaar gained significance and established a certain level of prominence and centrality in the region.

During the era of the Umayyad dynasty, the Arab rulers, aiming to control and dominate the southern regions of the Caspian Sea, established 44 military outposts stretching from present-day Astara to Esterabad (modern-day Gorgan). One of the most prominent of these posts was the Arta military fortress. These 44 outposts were commonly known as "Dine Sar," which essentially means "protector of religion." At the Arta military fortress, a commander named Bani Abbas, accompanied by 330 soldiers, governed the areas of present-day Qaem Shahr, Arateh, and Sari.

=== Before Christ ===
Based on the presence of ancient hills, Qaem Shahr boasts a deep and long-standing history:

Gardkooh Jemanoon Hill: The antiquity of Gardkooh Hill dates back to the Iron Age.

Taleghani Hill: Archaeological findings, historical relics, and human remains from the first millennium have been unearthed here.

Dineh Kafashgarkola Hill in Arateh: This hill, located in the village of Kafashgarkola Arateh in Qaem Shahr County, dates back to the first millennium BC, further proving the region's ancient history.

=== Ancient era ===
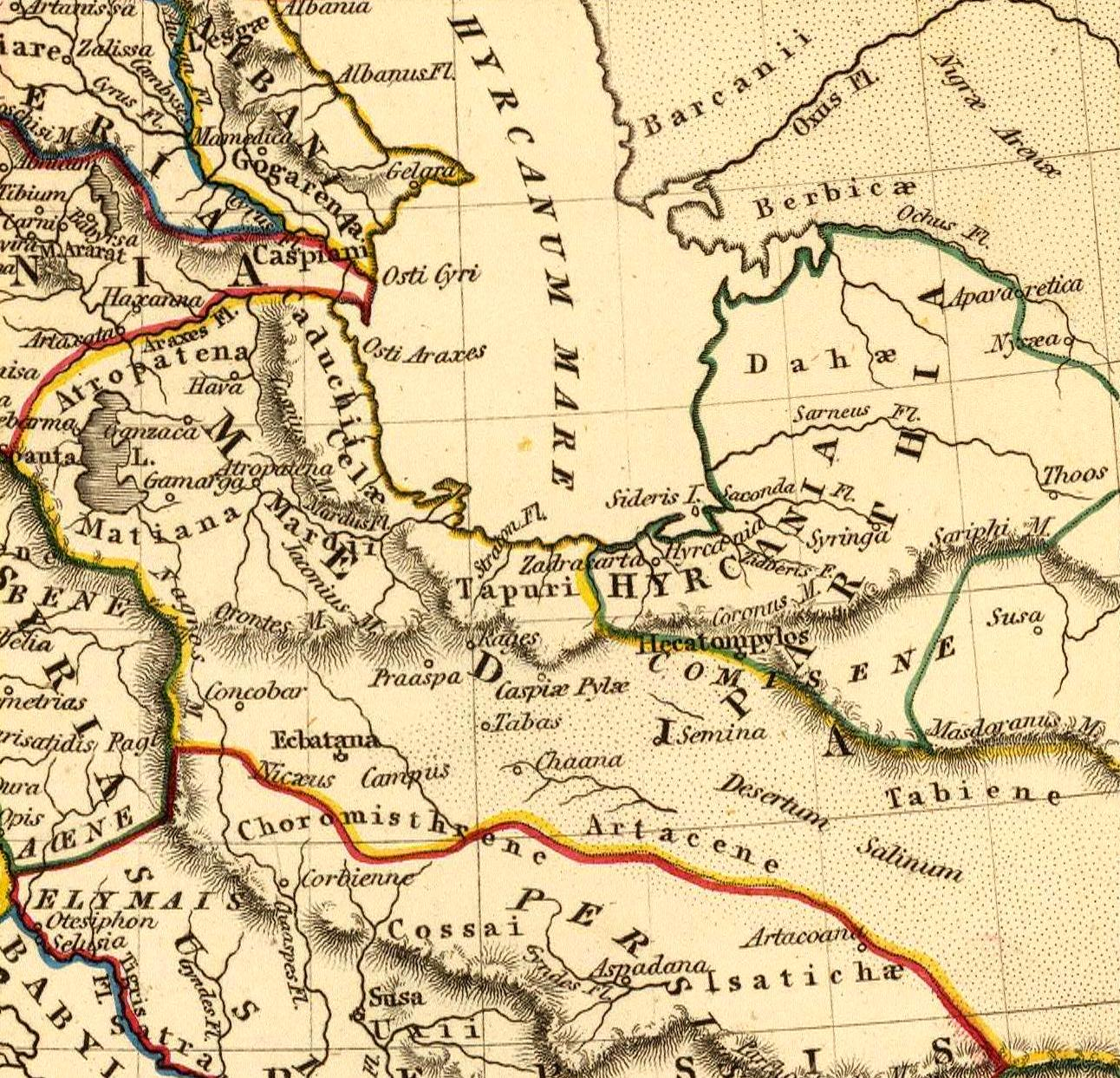
Location of the Tapur tribe in the 2nd century BC, from East Sepidrud to Aserm Hyrcania

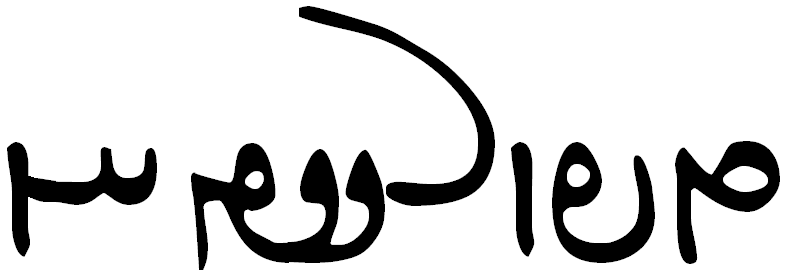
Before Islam, Mazandaran Province was known as Tapurstan (in Pahlavi: ), derived from the name of the Tapur tribe (in Greek: Τάπυροι). After Islam, the Tabari tribe inherited the name, and their homeland became known as Tabarestan.

According to Vasily Bartold, the Tapurs lived in the southeastern regions of the province and were subjects of the Achaemenid Empire. The Amardians were defeated by Alexander the Great, and later subdued by the Parthians, who resettled them near Rey in the 2nd century BC. The Tapurs then occupied the former lands of the Amardians. In his description of the Deylam region (eastern Gilan on the shores of the Caspian Sea), Ptolemy mentions only the Tapurs.

According to Mojtaba Minovi, the Amardian and Tapur tribes inhabited the land of Mazandaran. The Tapurs resided in the mountainous areas, while the Amardians lived in the plains of Mazandaran. In 176 BC, Phraates I relocated the Amardian tribe to the Khvar region, allowing the Tapurs to occupy the entire Mazandaran area, which then became known as Tapurstan. The cities of Amol, Chalous, Klar, Saeedabad, and Royan were part of the Tapur tribe's territory.

William Smith, in the Dictionary of Greek and Roman Geography, writes that the Tapur tribe was a people whose settlement throughout different historical periods seems to have extended across a vast area from Armenia eastward to the Oxus River (Amu Darya). Strabo places them near the Caspian Gates and Rey, in Parthia, between the Derbices and Aserm Hyrcania, alongside the Amardians and other groups along the southern shores of the Caspian Sea. This last perspective, which locates the Tapurs along the southern coasts of the Caspian Sea, aligns with the views of Quintus Curtius Rufus, Dionysius, and Pliny the Elder.

Ptolemy at times considers the Tapurs as part of the peoples of Media, while elsewhere he associates them with Margiana. There is no doubt that the region currently known as Tabarestan derives its name from the Tapurs mentioned by Pliny and Quintus Curtius. Aelian provides a peculiar description of the Tapurs who lived in Media.

=== Background ===
Throughout its history, Qaem Shahr has been known by various names such as Chamno, Tooji, Aliabad, and Shahi. The earliest recorded name of the city, mentioned in Islamic-era sources from the 7th to 9th centuries AH, is Chamno or Jamno. Chamno was the site of a battle in the 3rd century between Soleiman bin Abdollah, a Taherian ruler of Tabarestan, and Hasan bin Zayd, the leader of the Alavids of Tabarestan. Other historical and geographical sources also refer to the city as Tooji, Triji, or Taranjeh. This fortified city, which also had a castle, has been mentioned under different names.

Some sources consider Taranjeh and Tooji to be the same location, while others treat them as two distinct places. Zahir al-Din Marashi refers to Tooji and Chamno as villages in the western parts of the Sari province. Based on Zahir al-Din Marashi's accounts, the city of Tooji should be located near present-day Qaem Shahr. In Istakhri's Masalik al-Mamalik, the location of Tooji is described as being near Sari and separate from Mamtabar. A significant historical event at the fortress of Tooji was the battle between the forces of Seyyed Kamal al-Din Marashi and Kiyavastasp Jalali.

In sources from the 9th century AH, this city is referred to as the region of Aliabad. In the travelogues of Safavid-era explorers, such as Pietro della Valle, who visited Mazandaran and present-day Qaem Shahr, as well as in Tarikh-e Giti Gosha related to the Zand dynasty period, the city is mentioned under the name Aliabad. In late February 1931, by order of Reza Shah, Aliabad was renamed Shahi.

=== The position of Tujī in Tabarestan ===
Tujī (also referred to as Trījī, Trījeh, Tarnjeh, and Barjī) is mentioned as one of the cities of Tabarestan.

Ibn Rusta, a historian from the 3rd century, describes Tabarestan as bounded by Gorgan and Qumis in the east, Deylam in the west, the sea in the north, and certain regions of Qumis and Rey in the south. According to Ibn Rusta, Tabarestan consisted of fourteen districts, with Khore of Amol as the capital and central city of the region, and its cities included: Sari, Vasram, Mamteer, Tarnjeh, Roubast, Mileh, Merarkadieh (Kadah), Mehrovan, Tamis, Tamar, Natel, Shalus, Royan, and Kalar (Kalardasht).

Estakhri writes that the cities of Amol, Natel, Salus (Chalous), Kalar (Kalardasht), Royan, Mileh, Barjī, Cheshmeh Al-Ham, Mamteer, Sari, Asram, Mehrovan, Lamresk, and Tamisha are part of Tabarestan.

Ibn Hawqal, in describing Tabarestan, mentions that Amol is the largest city of Tabarestan and was the seat of government at his time. He describes the distances between cities: from Plur to Amol is one stage; Amol to Mileh is two farsakhs; Mileh to Trījī is two farsakhs; Trījī to Sari is one stage; Sari to Esterabad is four stages; Esterabad to Gorgan is two stages; Amol to Natel is one stage; Natel to Chalous is one stage; and towards the sea, Ayn Al-Ham is one stage. Ibn Hawqal lists the cities of Amol, Shalus (Chalous), Kalar (Kalardasht), Royan, Mileh, Trījī, Ayn Al-Ham, Mamteer, Asram, Sariyeh, and Tamisha as belonging to the province of Tabarestan.

Maqdisi identifies "Jurjan, Tabarestan, Deylam, and Jilan" as belonging to the fifth climatic region of the world in Ahsan al-Taqasim fi Ma'rifat al-Aqalim. Maqdisi also describes Tabarestan as having many mountains and abundant rain, noting Amol as the capital of Tabarestan and cities like Chalous, Mamteer, Tarnjeh, Asram, Sariyeh, Tamisha, and others as part of Tabarestan.

According to Hudud al-'Alam, Tamisha, Lamresk, Sari, Asram, Mamteer, Trījī, Mileh, Amol, Al-Ham, Natel, Roudan, Chalous, and Kalar (Kalardasht) are among the cities of Tabarestan. The author of Hudud al-'Alam notes that Natel, Roudan, Chalous, and Kalar (Kalardasht) were small towns located in the mountains and valleys, forming part of Tabarestan but under a different kingdom governed by a ruler called "Istandar."

Abul Qasim ibn Ahmad Jihani in his book Ashkal al-'Alam mentions the cities of Tabarestan, including: Amol, Natel, Salus (Chalous), Kalaroudan (Kalardasht), Ayn Al-Ham, Mamteer, the ancient city of Asram, Sari, Tamisha, Esterabad, Jurjan, Abaskoon, and Dehestan. He notes the routes from Amol to Deylam, Amol to Natel, from Natel to Salus, from Salus to Kalar, and from Kalar to Deylam.

Rabino notes that the extent of Deylam did not exceed more than one stage west of the Kalar region of Tabarestan. Hamzeh Esfahani, a historian from the 3rd century, writes in his book History of the Kings and Prophets that Tabarestan had many districts, one of which was the region of Deylam, and Iranians referred to the people of Deylam as the "Kurds of Tabarestan," just as Arabs called the people of Iraq the "Kurds of Sorestān."

Ibn Esfandiyar describes Tabarestan as spanning east to west, bounded by Dinargar to Malat, roughly equivalent to the present-day Kordkuy and Rudsar. In his book History of Tabarestan, Ibn Esfandiyar lists cities in Tabarestan that had mosques and congregational prayer spaces: Amol, Asram, Sari, Mamteer, Roudbast, Trijeh, Mileh, Mehrovan, Ahlam, Pay Dasht, Natel, Kanu, Shalus (Chalous), Bikhuri, Lamresk, Tamish in the plains; and in the mountains, Kalar (Kalardasht), Royan, Namar, Kajuyeh, Vimeh, Shelanbeh, Vafad, Al-Jomha, Sharmam, Larjan, Omidvar Kuh, Prim, and Hazarger.

== Geography ==
=== Geographical location ===
According to historical records, the initial foundation of this city was established during the Qajar era under the name Aliabad. It originally consisted of a village with commercial and residential units near today's Taleghani Square, along with neighborhoods surrounding it and large villages such as Chamno (present-day Jemnan, which is now a part of the city itself), Qadikola-ye Bozorg, and Kuchaksara on its outskirts. After the fall of the Qajar dynasty and the beginning of Reza Shah's reign, due to its strategic regional position (serving as a transit route for trade and pilgrimage caravans from neighboring provinces such as Tehran, Gilan, and Khorasan), the area gained increased importance.

Today, it is recognized as a geographically strategic city, linking Tehran to the north and northeast through two different routes: Firuzkuh Road and Haraz road. It is reported that annually, five million travelers pass through the Firuzkuh Road to Qaem Shahr, which also connects to the maritime border via the port of Babolsar.

From a climatic and geographical perspective, the area experiences a Mediterranean and moderate Caspian climate, characterized by humid summers, while the southern regions have relatively cold and rainy winters. The city is located 20 kilometers from the provincial center and 180 kilometers north of Tehran, situated between the Caspian Sea and the Alborz Mountains.

Qaem Shahr is where the North Iranian railway quits the fertile plains of Mazandaran to cross the highest mountain range of the Middle East, the Alborz.

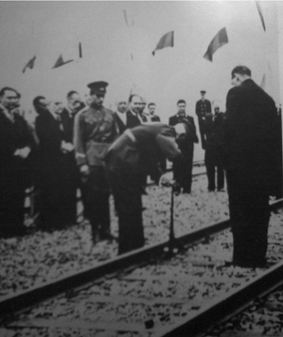
Reza Shah, Qaemshahr railway

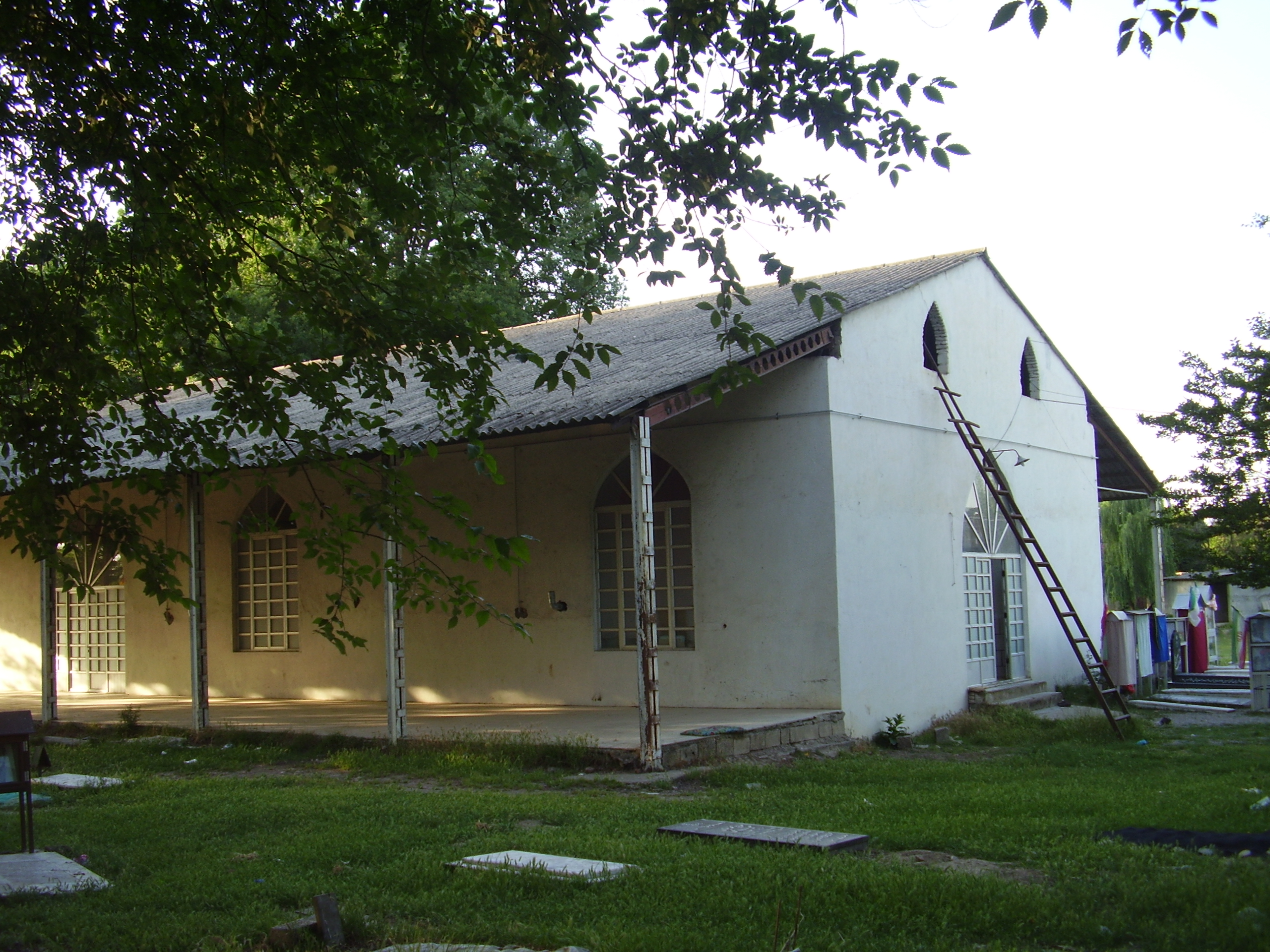
Sheykh Tabarsi's tomb in Qaem Shahr

=== Climate ===
Qaem Shahr has a humid subtropical climate (Cfa) according to the Köppen climate classification.

Climate data for Qara Kheyl (normals 1991-2020, extremes 1984-2023) elevation: 14.7
Month	Jan	Feb	Mar	Apr	May	Jun	Jul	Aug	Sep	Oct	Nov	Dec	Year
Record high °C (°F)	30.4 (86.7)	34.6 (94.3)	36.2 (97.2)	39.0 (102.2)	40.6 (105.1)	39.6 (103.3)	38.4 (101.1)	40.6 (105.1)	40.2 (104.4)	38.6 (101.5)	32.2 (90.0)	28.4 (83.1)	40.6 (105.1)
Mean daily maximum °C (°F)	12.6 (54.7)	12.7 (54.9)	15.5 (59.9)	20.1 (68.2)	25.3 (77.5)	29.1 (84.4)	30.9 (87.6)	31.8 (89.2)	28.7 (83.7)	24.3 (75.7)	18.2 (64.8)	14.1 (57.4)	21.9 (71.5)
Daily mean °C (°F)	7.3 (45.1)	7.7 (45.9)	10.6 (51.1)	14.9 (58.8)	20.3 (68.5)	24.2 (75.6)	26.1 (79.0)	26.5 (79.7)	23.5 (74.3)	18.7 (65.7)	12.8 (55.0)	8.8 (47.8)	16.8 (62.2)
Mean daily minimum °C (°F)	3.1 (37.6)	3.7 (38.7)	6.7 (44.1)	10.8 (51.4)	16.0 (60.8)	20.0 (68.0)	22.2 (72.0)	22.4 (72.3)	19.6 (67.3)	14.4 (57.9)	8.7 (47.7)	4.6 (40.3)	12.7 (54.8)
Record low °C (°F)	−6.0 (21.2)	−5.2 (22.6)	−1.8 (28.8)	0.2 (32.4)	5.4 (41.7)	13.0 (55.4)	16.6 (61.9)	14.2 (57.6)	11.6 (52.9)	4.2 (39.6)	−3.8 (25.2)	−3.6 (25.5)	−6.0 (21.2)
Average precipitation mm (inches)	70.7 (2.78)	66.1 (2.60)	67.6 (2.66)	43.8 (1.72)	27.3 (1.07)	30.1 (1.19)	30.0 (1.18)	33.4 (1.31)	77.1 (3.04)	91.9 (3.62)	110.2 (4.34)	74.5 (2.93)	722.7 (28.44)
Average precipitation days (≥ 1.0 mm)	7.2	7.8	7.7	6.3	4.8	3.9	4.5	4.7	6.9	6.3	7.6	7.2	74.9
Average rainy days	9.5	10.7	13	11.2	7.8	5	5.7	6.5	8	8.1	9.4	9.5	104.4
Average snowy days	0.9	0.85	0.1	0	0	0	0	0	0	0	0.25	0	2.1
Average relative humidity (%)	84	84	83	82	78	77	79	78	81	82	84	85	81
Average dew point °C (°F)	4.5 (40.1)	4.9 (40.8)	7.5 (45.5)	11.5 (52.7)	16.1 (61.0)	19.7 (67.5)	21.8 (71.2)	22.1 (71.8)	19.8 (67.6)	15.3 (59.5)	10.0 (50.0)	6.1 (43.0)	13.3 (55.9)
Mean monthly sunshine hours	139	119	131	153	204	222	212	206	166	173	146	137	2,008
Source 1: NOAA
Source 2: IRIMO (extremes), meteomanz(snow days 2004-2023, extremes since 2021)

== Notable people ==
- Behdad Salimi (born 1989) – weightlifter
- Farhad Majidi – football player
- Nader Dastneshan (1960–2021) – football coach
- Mehrdad Oladi (1985–2016) – football player
- Mehrdad Kafshgari (born 1987) – football player
- Fereydoon Fazli (born 1971) – football player
- Babak Nourzad (born 1978) – wrestler
- Mojtaba Tarshiz (born 1978) – football player
- Farshid Talebi (born 1981) – football player
- Maysam Baou (born 1983) – football player
- Mehdi Jafarpour (born 1984) – football player
- Mohammad Abbaszadeh (born 1990) – football player
- Ali Alipour (born 1995) – football player
- Behnam Tayyebi (born 1975) – wrestler
- Ahmad Mohammadi (born 1989) – wrestler

== Notable places ==
- Gerdkooh Hills
- Old Municipality Building
- Islamic Azad University Qaemshahr Branch
- Telar Jungle Park
- Tomb of Sheykh Tabarsi
- Qadi Kola Forest
- Paein Lamok Park
- Siah Dasht Cave
- Imamzadeh Seyed Mohammad Zarin Nava
- Kerchang Lagoon
- Zamzam Dam
- Talar River
- Kutna Village
- Golpol Lake
- Tomb of Seyyed Abu Saleh
- Reykandeh Village

== Agriculture and animal husbandry ==
The fertile lands of this county have significant potential for cultivating various crops, especially wheat, barley, rice, vegetables, soybeans, and more. Additionally, Qaem Shahr is known as the hub of citrus production in Iran; the highly productive citrus orchards in this city, particularly along the Military Road, are well-regarded.

Other products, such as sugarcane, honey, silk, hemp, and sesame, are found in forested and mountainous villages like Seyyed Abusaleh, Golafshan, and Rikandeh.

Cattle, sheep, and goat rearing are also common practices in various plain and mountainous areas, utilizing the resources available in each village.

=== Sugarcane cultivation ===
The cultivation and traditional production of red sugar from sugarcane are mostly observed in the villages of Seyf Kati, Rikandeh, and Seyyed Abusaleh in Qaem Shahr. Sugarcane is processed in traditional workshops, producing not only sugar but also molasses. The resulting sugar, which is brown or locally called "black sugar," has numerous health benefits. These include alleviating chronic fatigue, cleansing liver toxins, soothing mouth and tongue heat, and reducing gum inflammation. It is also highly beneficial in treating favism, anemia, internal jaundice, and nervous disorders.

Following a period of decline, sugarcane cultivation continued in a very basic form and on a small scale in Mazandaran and favorable areas near the Caspian Sea.

During the reign of Naser al-Din Shah and with the efforts of Amir Kabir, steps were taken to revive this industry. Sugarcane from Mazandaran was brought for cultivation in Khuzestan. This effort in Mazandaran and Khuzestan involved importing new cuttings from India. However, sugar production from sugarcane did not thrive in either Mazandaran or Khuzestan.

== Sports ==
Qaem Shahr is one of the sports hubs in Iran and has consistently excelled in various sports disciplines such as football, wushu, kabaddi, weightlifting, roller skating, swimming, basketball, wrestling, gymnastics, boxing, chess, and martial arts. It has produced international and world-renowned athletes in these disciplines.

In 2010, athletes from this city earned 189 medals at the world, Asian, international, and national levels within just seven months, making Qaem Shahr the most honored county in this regard in the country.

=== Football ===
Football has a long history in Qaem Shahr. The Vatani Stadium (formerly Shahna) was built in the 1940s in Qaem Shahr. In the distant past, teams such as Taj Shahi before the 1950s, Bank Mellat, Azmayesh, and F.C. Nassaji Mazandaran (founded in 1959)—one of the oldest teams in Iran and a symbol of football in northern Iran—were prominent. Another notable team was Naft Qaem Shahr, which was later dissolved.

In the 1980s, football in Qaem Shahr was divided between two main teams: Nassaji and Sanat Naft Qaem Shahr, which competed in Iran's first league, Azadegan League (before the Persian Gulf Pro League was established). These two teams were tough competitors, even defeating Esteghlal or Persepolis in Qaem Shahr or holding them to draws in Tehran. Nassaji Mazandaran (2) Persepolis Tehran (0) Goals: Abbas Kavand (70) and Ghadir Ghaffari (93)

During the 1980s, Hossein Mesgar Saravi was the captain of the Iran national football team, and football in Qaem Shahr was associated with the brilliance of players like Nader Dastneshan. (Nader Dastneshan scored 9 goals for Nassaji in 8 games during the Iranian league in 1993, a record that remains unbroken to date.) However, the decline of football in Qaem Shahr began abruptly, with Naft being dissolved and Nassaji relegated to the first division. In 2018, after twenty-four years of waiting, Nassaji returned to Iran's Persian Gulf Pro League. Although Qaem Shahr has introduced many players to the Premier League and national team in recent years, it was unable to fill Nassaji's absence in the Pro League. Nassaji Mazandaran is the champion of the 2021–2022 Iran Football Hazfi Cup.
