= 2024–25 Esteghlal F.C. season =

Esteghlal
2024–25 season
- President: Farshid Samiei(until 8 January 2025); Ali Nazari Juybari(from 8 January 2025)
- Head coach: Javad Nekounam (until 1 October 2024); Sohrab Bakhtiarizadeh (interim; from 1 October 2024 to 18 October 2024); Pitso Mosimane(from 18 October 2024 to 28 January 2025); Sohrab Bakhtiarizadeh (interim; from 28 January 2025 to 20 February 2025); Mohammad Navazi (Caretaker; from 20 February 2025 to 26 February 2025); Miodrag Božović(from 26 February 2025 to April 23 2025); Mojtaba Jabbari(Caretaker;from 23 April)
- Stadium: Azadi Stadium
- Persian Gulf Pro League: 9th
- Hazfi Cup: Winners
- AFC Champions League Elite: Round of 16
| Home colours | Away colours |
- All statistics correct as of 12 December 2024.

The 2024–25 Esteghlal Football Club season is the 79th season and the club's 31st consecutive season in the top flight of Iranian football. In addition to the domestic league, Esteghlal are participating in this season's editions of the Hazfi Cup and AFC Champions League Elite.

== Players ==
Last updated: 4 April 2025

| No. | Name | Nat | Position | Date of birth (age) | Since | End | Signed from |
Goalkeepers
| 1 | Hossein Hosseini (captain) | (Iran) | GK | 30 June 1992 (aged 32) | 2012 | 2025 | (Iran) Youth Sector |
| 12 | Mohammad Reza Khaledabadi | (Iran) | GK | 30 April 2001 (aged 23) | 2023 | 2026 | (Iran) Havadar |
| 50 | Amirhossein Nikpour | (Iran) | GK | 4 April 2002 (aged 22) | 2024 | 2027 | (Iran) Gol Gohar |
Defenders
| 2 | Mohammad Hossein Moradmand | (Iran) | CB | 22 June 1993 (aged 31) | 2020 | 2025 | (Iran) Shahr Khodro |
| 6 | Iman Salimi | (Iran) | CB | 1 June 1996 (aged 28) | 2023 | 2025 | (Iran) Mes Rafsanjan |
| 10 | Ramin Rezaeian | (Iran) | RB / RW | 21 March 1990 (aged 34) | 2024 | 2026 | (Iran) Sepahan |
| 15 | Abolfazl Zamani | (Iran) | RB / CM | 1 March 2006 (aged 18) | 2024 | 2027 | (Iran) Paykan |
| 27 | Saleh Hardani | (Iran) | RB / RW | 26 December 1998 (aged 26) | 2025 | 2026 | (Iran) Sepahan |
| 33 | Abolfazl Jalali | (Iran) | LB / LM | 26 June 1998 (aged 26) | 2021 | 2026 | (Iran) Saipa |
| 44 | Armin Sohrabian | (Iran) | CB | 26 July 1995 (aged 29) | 2025 | 2026 | (Iran) Nassaji |
| 55 | Raphael Silva | (Brazil) | CB | 20 April 1992 (aged 32) | 2024 | 2025 | Unattached |
| 72 | Abolfazl Zoleikhaei | (Iran) | LB / LM | 9 March 2006 (aged 18) | 2025 | 2030 | Unattached |
Midfielders
| 4 | Rouzbeh Cheshmi | (Iran) | DM / CB | 24 July 1993 (aged 31) | 2021 | 2025 | (Qatar) Umm Salal |
| 14 | Zobeir Niknafs | (Iran) | DM / CM | 12 April 1993 (aged 31) | 2021 | 2025 | (Iran) Foolad |
| 22 | Didier Ndong | (Gabon) | CM / DM | 17 June 1994 (aged 30) | 2024 | 2025 | (Saudi Arabia) Al-Riyadh |
| 66 | Zargham Saadavi | (Iran) | DM / CM | 31 May 2006 (aged 18) | 2024 | 2028 | (Iran) Foolad |
| 70 | Mehdi Bahrami Nejad | (Iran) | AM | 5 June 2006 (aged 18) | 2024 | 2029 | (Iran) Doustimehr |
| 87 | Mehran Ahmadi | (Iran) | AM / RW | 26 December 1997 (aged 27) | 2025 | 2027 | (Iran) Kheybar |
| 88 | Arash Rezavand | (Iran) | AM / CM | 5 October 1993 (aged 31) | 2019 | 2025 | (Iran) Saipa |
Forwards
| 7 | Mehrdad Mohammadi | (Iran) | RW / ST | 29 September 1993 (aged 31) | 2023 | 2025 | (Qatar) Al Sailiya |
| 9 | Mohammad Reza Azadi | (Iran) | ST | 7 December 1999 (aged 25) | 2025 | 2027 | (United Arab Emirates) Al Urooba |
| 11 | Joel Kojo | (Kyrgyzstan) | ST | 21 August 1998 (aged 26) | 2025 | 2028 | (Uzbekistan) Dinamo |
| 20 | Alireza Koushki | (Iran) | LW / RW | 16 February 2000 (aged 24) | 2024 | 2026 | (Iran) Gol Gohar |
| 28 | Mojtaba Hasheminasab | (Iran) | RW / LW / AM | 20 October 2005 (aged 19) | 2024 | | (Iran) Youth Sector |
| 77 | Jaloliddin Masharipov | (Uzbekistan) | LW / RW | 1 September 1993 (aged 31) | 2024 | 2027 | (Greece) Panserraikos |
| 80 | Mohammad Hossein Eslami | (Iran) | RW / LW | 13 April 2001 (aged 23) | 2024 | 2026 | (Iran) Zob Ahan |
| 90 | Amir Mohammad Mardi | (Iran) | ST | 28 August 2006 (aged 18) | 2024 | 2029 | (Iran) KIA |
| 91 | Masoud Juma | (Kenya) | ST | 3 February 1996 (aged 28) | 2024 | 2025 | Unattached |
| 93 | Hesam Eskandari | (Iran) | ST | 21 April 2004 (aged 20) | 2023 | | (Iran) Youth Sector |
| 99 | Amirali Sadeghi | (Iran) | LW / AM | 9 February 2001 (aged 23) | 2021 | 2026 | (Iran) Saipa |
Players transferred during the season
| 3 | Saman Fallah | (Iran) | CB | 12 May 2001 (aged 23) | 2024 | 2027 | (Iran) Gol Gohar |
| 5 | Armin Sohrabian | (Iran) | CB | 26 July 1995 (aged 29) | 2023 | 2026 | (Iran) Gol Gohar |
| 17 | Almedin Ziljkić | (Bosnia and Herzegovina) | LW / RW | 25 February 1996 (aged 28) | 2024 | 2026 | (Bosnia and Herzegovina) Sarajevo |
| 18 | Milad Zakipour | (Iran) | LB / LM | 26 July 1995 (aged 29) | 2024 | 2026 | (Iran) Sepahan |
| 19 | Gustavo Blanco | (Argentina) | ST | 5 November 1991 (aged 33) | 2023 | 2025 | (Spain) Eibar |
| 21 | Gaël Kakuta | (Democratic Republic of the Congo) | AM / RW | 21 June 1991 (aged 33) | 2024 | 2025 | (France) Amiens |
| 23 | Arman Ramezani | (Iran) | ST | 22 June 1992 (aged 32) | 2021 | 2026 | (Iran) Persepolis |

== Transfers ==
=== In ===
| Date | Pos. | Player | From | Type | Ref. |
|---|---|---|---|---|---|
| 1 July 2024 | MF | (Iraq) Muntadher Mohammed | Mes Rafsanjan | End of loan | |
| 1 July 2024 | GK | (Iran) Sina Saeidifar | Shams Azar | End of loan | |
| 1 July 2024 | FW | (Iran) Hesam Eskandari | Shahrdari Astara | End of loan | |
| 1 July 2024 | FW | (Iran) Moein Enayati | Fajr Sepasi | End of loan | |
| 3 July 2024 | MF | (Iran) Mohammad Hossein Eslami | Zob Ahan | Transfer | |
| 4 July 2024 | DF | (Iran) Milad Zakipour | Sepahan | Transfer | |
| 14 July 2024 | DF | (Iran) Ramin Rezaeian | Sepahan | Transfer | |
| 17 July 2024 | DF | (Iran) Saman Fallah | Gol Gohar | Transfer | |
| 20 July 2024 | FW | (Iran) Alireza Koushki | Gol Gohar | Transfer | |
| 23 July 2024 | FW | (Bosnia and Herzegovina) Almedin Ziljkić | (Bosnia and Herzegovina) Sarajevo | Transfer | |
| 8 August 2024 | MF | (Democratic Republic of the Congo) Gaël Kakuta | (France) Amiens | Transfer | |
| 9 August 2024 | GK | (Iran) Amirhossein Nikpour | Gol Gohar | Transfer | |
| 10 August 2024 | MF | (Iran) Abbas Sharafi | Gol Gohar | Transfer | |
| 10 August 2024 | MF | (Iran) Mehdi Bahrami Nejad | Doustimehr | Transfer | |
| 10 August 2024 | FW | (Iran) Amir Mohammad Mardi | KIA | Transfer | |
| 11 August 2024 | MF | (Gabon) Didier Ndong | (Saudi Arabia) Al-Riyadh | Transfer | |
| 14 August 2024 | MF | (Iran) Zargham Saadavi | Foolad | Transfer | |
| 19 September 2024 | MF | (Iran) Abolfazl Zamani | Paykan | Transfer | |
| 8 December 2024 | FW | (Kenya) Masoud Juma | Unattached | Transfer | |
| 10 January 2025 | FW | (Kyrgyzstan) Joel Kojo | (Uzbekistan) Dinamo | Transfer | |
| 20 January 2025 | FW | (Iran) Mohammad Reza Azadi | (United Arab Emirates) Al Urooba | Transfer | |
| 26 January 2025 | DF | (Iran) Saleh Hardani | Sepahan | Transfer | |
| 26 January 2025 | DF | (Iran) Abolfazl Zoleikhaei | Unattached | Transfer | |
| 27 January 2025 | MF | (Iran) Mehran Ahmadi | Kheybar | Transfer | |
| 28 January 2025 | DF | (Iran) Armin Sohrabian | Nassaji | Transfer | |

=== Out ===
| Date | Pos. | Player | To | Type | Ref. |
|---|---|---|---|---|---|
| 17 July 2024 | DF | (Iran) Saleh Hardani | Sepahan | End of contract | |
| 28 July 2024 | MF | (Iran) Mohammad Hossein Zavari | Havadar | End of contract | |
| 29 July 2024 | MF | (Iran) Omid Hamedifar | Gol Gohar | End of contract | |
| 4 August 2024 | DF | (Iran) Alireza Karami | Chadormalou | Transfer | |
| 5 August 2024 | FW | (Iran) Peyman Babaei | Gol Gohar | End of contract | |
| 12 August 2024 | FW | (Iran) Reza Mirzaei | Malavan | End of contract | |
| 14 August 2024 | DF | (Iran) Taha Mohebipour | Aluminium | Transfer | |
| 14 August 2024 | DF | (Iran) Milad Fakhreddini | Shams Azar | Transfer | |
| 15 August 2024 | DF | (Iran) Jafar Salmani | Unattached | End of contract | |
| 28 August 2024 | DF | (Iran) Saman Touranian | Malavan | Loan | |
| 1 September 2024 | GK | (Iran) Mohammad Javad Kia | Havadar | Transfer | |
| 13 September 2024 | FW | (Bosnia and Herzegovina) Almedin Ziljkić | (Serbia) Novi Pazar | Transfer | |
| 14 September 2024 | FW | (Iran) Moein Enayati | (United Arab Emirates) Al Mooj | Transfer | |
| 17 September 2024 | MF | (Iraq) Muntadher Mohammed | Nassaji | Transfer | |
| 18 September 2024 | FW | (France) Arthur Yamga | Nassaji | Transfer | |
| 6 October 2024 | GK | (Iran) Sina Saeidifar | Nikapars | Transfer | |
| 9 October 2024 | DF | (Iran) Armin Sohrabian | Nassaji | Transfer | |
| 19 January 2025 | MF | (Iran) Mehdi Mehdipour | Nassaji | Transfer | |
| 24 January 2025 | FW | (Argentina) Gustavo Blanco | Foolad | Transfer | |
| 24 January 2025 | FW | (Iran) Arman Ramezani | Zob Ahan | Transfer | |
| 24 January 2025 | DF | (Iran) Saman Fallah | Malavan | Loan | |
| 26 January 2025 | DF | (Iran) Milad Zakipour | Sepahan | Transfer | |
| 2 February 2025 | MF | (Iran) Abbas Sharafi | Nirooye Zamini | Loan | |
| 9 February 2025 | MF | (Democratic Republic of the Congo) Gaël Kakuta | (Turkey) Sakaryaspor | Transfer | |

=== Contract renewals ===
| Date | Pos. | Name | Contract length | Contract ends | Ref. |
|---|---|---|---|---|---|
| 1 July 2024 | DF | (Iran) Abolfazl Jalali | two years | 2026 | |
| 1 July 2024 | DF | (Iran) Armin Sohrabian | two years | 2026 | |
| 12 July 2024 | MF | (Iran) Rouzbeh Cheshmi | one year | 2025 | |
| 13 July 2023 | FW | (Iran) Mehrdad Mohammadi | one year | 2025 | |
| 22 July 2024 | MF | (Iran) Zobeir Niknafs | one year | 2025 | |
| 25 July 2024 | MF | (Iran) Arash Rezavand | one year | 2025 | |
| 27 July 2024 | FW | (Iran) Arman Ramezani | two years | 2026 | |
| 1 July 2024 | DF | (Iran) Mohammad Hossein Moradmand | one year | 2025 | |
| 19 September 2024 | FW | (Iran) Amirali Sadeghi | two years | 2026 | |

== Pre-season and friendlies ==
| 25 July 2024 Friendly | Esteghlal | 5–0 | Salehin | Tehran |
| | Masharipov 34'; Rezavand 50'; Sohrabian 51'; Blanco 55', 65' | Report | | Stadium: Nasser Hejazi Camp |

| 30 July 2024 Friendly | İstanbulspor (Turkey) | 1–1 | (Iran) Esteghlal | Erzurum, Turkey |
| | Özer 77' | Report | Masharipov 53' | Stadium: Yüksek İrtifa Kamp Merkezi |

| 2 August 2024 Friendly | Al-Orobah (Saudi Arabia) | 2–3 | (Iran) Esteghlal | Erzurum, Turkey |
| 17:30 UTC+3 | Al-Zubaidi (pen.) | Report | Rezavand; Ziljkić; Rezaeian | Stadium: Yüksek İrtifa Kamp Merkezi |

| 8 August 2024 Friendly | Esteghlal | 1–0 | Gol Gohar | Tehran |
| | Cheshmi 3' (red card) 70' | Report | Babaei (penalty missed) 81' | Stadium: Dastgerdi |

| 6 September 2024 Friendly | Esteghlal | 2–0 | Shahrdari Bandar Abbas | Tehran |
| | Mohammadi; Eslami | Report | | Stadium: Azadi |

| 9 September 2024 Friendly | Esteghlal | 1–0 | Gol Gohar | Tehran |
| | Ramezani | Report | | Stadium: Azadi |

| 9 September 2024 Friendly | Esteghlal | 3–0 | Chadormalou | Tehran |
| 15:30 UTC+3:30 | Rezaeian (pen.); Ramezani; Sadeghi | Report | | Stadium: Azadi |

== Competitions ==
=== Overview ===
| Competition | First match | Last match | Starting round | Final position | Record | | | | | | | |
| Competition | First match | Last match | Starting round | Final position | Pld | W | D | L | GF | GA | GD | Win % |
|---|---|---|---|---|---|---|---|---|---|---|---|---|
| Persian Gulf Pro League | 16 August 2024 | 15 May 2025 | Matchday 1 | 9th | 30 | 7 | 13 | 10 | 30 | 33 | −3 | 23.33 |
| Hazfi Cup | 12 December 2024 | 29 May 2025 | Round of 32 | Winner | 5 | 5 | 0 | 0 | 7 | 1 | +6 | 100.00 |
| AFC Champions League Elite | 16 September 2024 | 10 March 2025 | League stage | Round of 16 | 10 | 2 | 4 | 4 | 8 | 12 | −4 | 20.00 |
| Total | | | | | 45 | 14 | 17 | 14 | 45 | 46 | −1 | 31.11 |

Last updated: 15 May 2025
Source: Soccerway

=== Persian Gulf Pro League ===
==== Standings ====
| Pos | Team | Pld | W | D | L | GF | GA | GD | Pts | Qualification or relegation |
|---|---|---|---|---|---|---|---|---|---|---|
| 7 | Malavan | 30 | 10 | 9 | 11 | 33 | 33 | 0 | 39 | |
| 8 | Aluminium Arak | 30 | 7 | 14 | 9 | 30 | 31 | −1 | 35 | |
| 9 | Esteghlal (Note: Esteghlal qualified to the AFC Champions League Two as 2024–25 Hazfi Cup champions.) | 30 | 7 | 13 | 10 | 30 | 33 | −3 | 34 (Note: Esteghlal finished ahead of Chadormalou on Total goal difference. Head-to-head points: Esteghlal 2, Chadormalou 2. Total goal difference: Esteghlal −3, Chadormalou −6.) | Qualification for the 2025–26 AFC Champions League Two group stage |
| 10 | Chadormalou | 30 | 8 | 10 | 12 | 22 | 28 | −6 | 34 | |
| 11 | Kheybar | 30 | 8 | 9 | 13 | 24 | 31 | −7 | 33 | |

Source: Iran Football League Organization - League Full Table, Iplstats
Rules for classification: 1) Points; 2) Head-to-head points; 3) Head-to-head goal difference; 4) Total goal difference; 5) Total goals scored; 6) Fair-play points.
(Note: Head-to-head record is used only after all the matches between the teams in question have been played).

==== Results summary ====
| Overall | | | | | | | | Home | | | | | | Away | | | | | |
| Pld | W | D | L | GF | GA | GD | Pts | W | D | L | GF | GA | GD | W | D | L | GF | GA | GD |
|---|---|---|---|---|---|---|---|---|---|---|---|---|---|---|---|---|---|---|---|
| 30 | 7 | 13 | 10 | 30 | 33 | −3 | 34 | 4 | 6 | 5 | 15 | 15 | 0 | 3 | 7 | 5 | 15 | 18 | −3 |

Source: Ipl Stats

==== Results by round ====
| Round | 1 | 2 | 3 | 4 | 5 | 6 | 7 | 8 | 9 | 10 | 11 | 12 | 13 | 14 | 15 | 16 | 17 | 18 | 19 | 20 | 21 | 22 | 23 | 24 | 25 | 26 | 27 | 28 | 29 | 30 |
|---|---|---|---|---|---|---|---|---|---|---|---|---|---|---|---|---|---|---|---|---|---|---|---|---|---|---|---|---|---|---|
| Ground | A | H | A | H | A | H | A | H | A | H | A | H | A | A | H | H | A | H | A | H | A | H | A | H | A | H | A | H | H | A |
| Result | W | D | L | W | D | L | W | L | L | L | W | D | D | D | D | L | D | W | D | W | L | D | D | D | L | L | D | W | D | L |
| Position | 3 | 3 | 6 | 10 | 9 | 11 | 8 | 11 | 12 | 10 | 8 | 8 | 9 | 10 | 10 | 11 | 11 | 9 | 9 | 7 | 9 | 10 | 9 | 9 | 12 | 12 | 11 | 8 | 8 | 9 |

Updated to match(es) played on 15 May 2025. Source: "Iran Football League Organization - League Full Table".
A = Away; H = Home; W = Win; D = Draw; L = Loss; P = postponed

==== Matches ====
The league fixtures were announced on 23 July.

| 16 August 2024 1 | Shams Azar | 1–2 | Esteghlal | Qazvin |
| 19:30 UTC+3:30 | Nesaei 89' (pen.) | Report | Ramezani 54'; Eslami 90+3' | Stadium: Sardar Azadegan; Attendance: 10,000; Referee: Payam Heydari |

| 23 August 2024 2 | Esteghlal | 2–2 | Malavan | Qazvin |
| 19:30 UTC+3:30 | Rezaeian 32' (pen.), 83' (pen.) | Report | Ghandipour 8'; Jafari 62' | Stadium: Sardar Azadegan; Attendance: 12,000; Referee: Koupal Nazemi |

| 29 August 2024 3 | Esteghlal Khuzestan | 1–0 | Esteghlal | Ahvaz |
| 20:30 UTC+3:30 | Bifouma 80' | Report | | Stadium: Foolad Arena; Attendance: 20,000; Referee: Mohammad Hossein Zahedifard |

| 9 November 2024 4 | Esteghlal | 1–0 | Mes Rafsanjan | Shahr-e Qods |
| 18:30 UTC+3:30 | Zamani 9' | Report | | Stadium: Shohada; Attendance: 5,000; Referee: Mohammad Hossein Zahedifard |

| 20 September 2024 5 | Nassaji | 2–2 | Esteghlal | Qaem Shahr |
| 17:15 UTC+3:30 | Yamga 45+1' (pen.); Pakdel 73' | Report | Rezaeian 63' (pen.); Jalali 75' | Stadium: Vatani; Attendance: 15,000; Referee: Ali Safaei |

| 25 September 2024 6 | Esteghlal | 0–1 | Persepolis | Arak |
| 19:00 UTC+3:30 | | Report | Kanaani 90+3' (pen.) | Stadium: Imam Khomeini; Attendance: 15,000; Referee: Bijan Heydari |

| 5 October 2024 7 | Havadar | 1–2 | Esteghlal | Shahr-e Qods |
| 20:00 UTC+3:30 | Goudarzi 90+5' (pen.) | Report | Silva 17'; Mohammadi 45+1' | Stadium: Shohada; Attendance: 5,000; Referee: Seyyed Reza Mahdavi |

| 18 October 2024 8 | Esteghlal | 0–3 | Zob Ahan | Shahr-e Qods |
| 18:30 UTC+3:30 | | Report | Aliyari 56', 87'; Latifi 70' | Stadium: Shohada; Attendance: 5,000; Referee: Amir Arab-Baraghi |

| 26 October 2024 9 | Kheybar | 3–1 | Esteghlal | Khorramabad |
| 17:00 UTC+3:30 | Ghanbari 10'; Mohebi 59'; Sefid 90+4' | Report | Rezaeian 55' | Stadium: Lor Arena; Attendance: 20,000; Referee: Vahid Kazemi |

| 31 October 2024 10 | Esteghlal | 0–2 | Tractor | Shahr-e Qods |
| 17:45 UTC+3:30 | | Report | Aghasi 56'; Ashouri 87' | Stadium: Shohada; Attendance: 10,000; Referee: Bijan Heydari |

| 7 December 2024 11 | Foolad | 0–2 | Esteghlal | Ahvaz |
| 19:00 UTC+3:30 | | Report | Silva 3'; Sadeghi 21' | Stadium: Foolad Arena; Attendance: 25,000; Referee: Hassan Akrami |

| 16 December 2024 12 | Esteghlal | 0–0 | Gol Gohar | Shahr-e Qods |
| 17:30 UTC+3:30 | | Report | | Stadium: Shohada; Referee: Mouood Bonyadifar |

| 20 December 2024 13 | Aluminium | 1–1 | Esteghlal | Arak |
| 17:45 UTC+3:30 | Kazemian 63' | Report | Masharipov 45+3' (pen.) | Stadium: Imam Khomeini; Attendance: 5,000; Referee: Koopal Nazemi |

| 26 December 2024 14 | Chadormalou | 0–0 | Esteghlal | Yazd |
| 17:30 UTC+3:30 | | Report | | Stadium: Shahid Nassiri; Referee: Ahmad Mohammadi |

| 2 January 2025 15 | Esteghlal | 1–1 | Sepahan | Tehran |
| 17:30 UTC+3:30 | Juma 22' | Report | Limouchi 73' | Stadium: Takhti; Referee: Bijan Heydari |

| 20 January 2025 16 | Esteghlal | 0–1 | Shams Azar | Tehran |
| 15:30 UTC+3:30 | | Report | Shabani 64' | Stadium: Azadi Stadium; Attendance: 8,000; Referee: Reza Mahdavi |

| 25 January 2025 17 | Malavan | 0–0 | Esteghlal | Bandar-e Anzali |
| 15:45 UTC+3:30 | | Report | | Stadium: Sirous Ghayeghran; Referee: Payam Heydari |

| 30 January 2025 18 | Esteghlal | 2–0 | Esteghlal Khuzestan | Tehran |
| 17:00 UTC+3:30 | Rezaeian 72' (pen.), 90+2' (pen.) | Report | | Stadium: Takhti; Referee: Ahmad Mohammadi |

| 7 February 2025 19 | Mes Rafsanjan | 0–0 | Esteghlal | Rafsanjan |
| 16:45 UTC+3:30 | | Report | | Stadium: Shohadaye Mes Rafsanjan; Attendance: 5,000; Referee: Morteza Mansourian |

| 22 February 2025 20 | Esteghlal | 1–0 | Nassaji | Tehran |
| 18:30 UTC+3:30 | Koushki 56' | Report | | Stadium: Azadi Stadium; Attendance: 5,000; Referee: Reza Mahdavi |

| 27 February 2025 21 | Persepolis | 2–1 | Esteghlal | Tehran |
| 17:15 UTC+3:30 | Kanaanizadegan 45+4' (pen.); Alipour | Report | Koushki 55' | Stadium: Azadi Stadium; Referee: Payam Heydari |

| 21 April 2025 22 | Esteghlal | 2–2 | Havadar | Tehran |
| 18:00 UTC+3:30 | Rezaeian 4'; Rahmati 51' (o.g.) | Report | Shojaeian 6'; Sadeghi 28' | Stadium: Azadi Stadium; Attendance: 6,000; Referee: Koupal Nazemi |

| 16 March 2025 23 | Zob Ahan | 1–1 | Esteghlal | Fooladshahr |
| 19:00 UTC+3:30 | Azarbad 45' | Report | Rezaeian 84' | Stadium: Foolad Shahr; Referee: Hossein Ziyari |

| 29 March 2025 24 | Esteghlal | 1–1 | Kheybar | Tehran |
| 19:15 UTC+3:30 | Azadi 3' | Report | Emamali 6' | Stadium: Azadi Stadium; Referee: Ahmad Mohammadi |

| 4 April 2025 25 | Tractor | 2–1 | Esteghlal | Tabriz |
| 18:25 UTC+3:30 | Khalilzadeh 12' (o.g.) | Report | Hosseinzadeh 23', 37' | Stadium: Sahand; Attendance: 90,000; Referee: Mouood Bonyadifar |

| 10 April 2025 26 | Esteghlal | 0–1 | Foolad | Tehran |
| 18:00 UTC+3:30 | | Report | Sarabadani 81' | Stadium: Azadi Stadium; Referee: Bijan Heydari |

| 16 April 2025 27 | Gol Gohar | 1–1 | Esteghlal | Sirjan |
| 18:00 UTC+3:30 | Azadi 9' (o.g.) | Report | Rezaeian 90+2' (pen.) | Stadium: Qasem Soleimani; Attendance: 5,000; Referee: Vahid Kazemi |

| 2 May 2025 28 | Esteghlal | 5–1 | Aluminium | Tehran |
| 18:15 UTC+3:30 | Rezaeian 31' (pen.); Eslami 53'; Juma 57'; Kojo 81', 90+4' | Report | Bozourg 78' | Stadium: Azadi Stadium; Attendance: 5,000; Referee: Amir Arab-Baraghi |

| 8 May 2025 29 | Esteghlal | 0–0 | Chadormalou | Tehran |
| 19:30 UTC+3:30 | | Report | | Stadium: Azadi Stadium; Referee: Farhad Amini |

| 15 May 2025 30 | Sepahan | 3–1 | Esteghlal | Isfahan |
| 18:00 UTC+3:30 | Rezaei 36'; Mohebi 76'; Ben Yedder 88' | Report | Eslami 10' | Stadium: Naghsh-e-Jahan; Referee: Mouood Bonyadifar |

=== Hazfi Cup ===
| 12 December 2024 Round of 32 | Esteghlal | 1–0 | Mes Kerman | Shahr-e Qods |
| 16:15 UTC+3:30 | Blanco 49' | Report | | Stadium: Shahr-e Qods; Attendance: 0 (Note: The match was played behind closed doors due to reduce traffic and prevent the increase in pollutants.); Referee: Morteza Mansourian |

| 13 February 2025 Round of 16 | Shams Azar | 1–2 (a.e.t.) | Esteghlal | Qazvin |
| 17:15 UTC+3:30 | Zendehrouh 90+4' | Report | Azadi 27'; Rezaeian 95' | Stadium: Sardar Azadegan Stadium; Attendance: 3,000; Referee: Vahid Kazemi |

| 26 April 2025 Round of 8 | Esteghlal | 1–0 | Paykan | Tehran |
| 18:00 UTC+3:30 | Rezaeian 90+4' (pen.) | Report | | Stadium: Azadi Stadium; Attendance: 20,000; Referee: Reza Mahdavi |

| 24 May 2025 Semi-finals | Esteghlal | 2–0 | Sanat Naft Abadan | Tehran |
| 19:45 UTC+3:30 | Koushki 44'; Juma 57' | Report | | Stadium: Azadi Stadium; Attendance: 35,000; Referee: Koupal Nazemi |

| 29 May 2025 Final | Esteghlal | 1–0 (a.e.t.) | Malavan | Arak |
| 19:45 UTC+3:30 | Cheshmi 120' | Report | | Stadium: Imam Khomeini Stadium; Attendance: 10,000; Referee: Mouood Bonyadifar |

=== 2024–25 AFC Champions League Elite ===
==== League stage ====
| Pos | Team | Pld | W | D | L | GF | GA | GD | Pts | Qualification |
|---|---|---|---|---|---|---|---|---|---|---|
| 1 | (Saudi Arabia) Al-Hilal | 8 | 7 | 1 | 0 | 26 | 7 | +19 | 22 | Advance to round of 16 |
| 2 | (Saudi Arabia) Al-Ahli | 8 | 7 | 1 | 0 | 21 | 8 | +13 | 22 | Advance to round of 16 |
| 3 | (Saudi Arabia) Al-Nassr | 8 | 5 | 2 | 1 | 17 | 6 | +11 | 17 | Advance to round of 16 |
| 4 | (Qatar) Al-Sadd | 8 | 3 | 3 | 2 | 10 | 9 | +1 | 12 | Advance to round of 16 |
| 5 | (United Arab Emirates) Al Wasl | 8 | 3 | 2 | 3 | 8 | 12 | −4 | 11 | Advance to round of 16 |
| 6 | (Iran) Esteghlal | 8 | 2 | 3 | 3 | 8 | 9 | −1 | 9 | Advance to round of 16 |
| 7 | (Qatar) Al-Rayyan | 8 | 2 | 2 | 4 | 8 | 12 | −4 | 8 | Advance to round of 16 |
| 8 | (Uzbekistan) Pakhtakor | 8 | 1 | 4 | 3 | 4 | 6 | −2 | 7 | Advance to round of 16 |
| 9 | (Iran) Persepolis | 8 | 1 | 4 | 3 | 6 | 10 | −4 | 7 | |
| 10 | (Qatar) Al-Gharafa | 8 | 2 | 1 | 5 | 10 | 18 | −8 | 7 | |
| 11 | (Iraq) Al-Shorta | 8 | 1 | 3 | 4 | 7 | 17 | −10 | 6 | |
| 12 | (United Arab Emirates) Al Ain | 8 | 0 | 2 | 6 | 11 | 22 | −11 | 2 | |

Source: Asian Football Confederation
Rules for classification: 1) points; 2) goal difference; 3) number of goals scored; 4) number of matches won; 5) penalty shoot-out if only two teams remain tied and played each other on the final matchday 6) fair play ranking; 7) drawing of lots

| 16 September 2024 1 | Esteghlal (Iran) | 3–0 | (Qatar) Al-Gharafa | Shahr-e Qods, Iran |
| 21:30 UTC+3:30 | Abdalla 4' (o.g.); Rezaeian 79'; Rezavand 88' | Report | | Stadium: Shohada; Attendance: 8,572; Referee: Ma Ning (China) |

| 30 September 2024 2 | Al-Sadd (Qatar) | 2–0 | (Iran) Esteghlal | Doha, Qatar |
| 19:00 UTC+3 | Hosseini 40' (o.g.); Afif 68' (pen.) | Report | | Stadium: Jassim bin Hamad; Attendance: 6,599; Referee: Kim Jong-hyeok (South Korea) |

| 22 October 2024 3 | Esteghlal (Iran) | 0–1 | (Saudi Arabia) Al-Nassr | Dubai, United Arab Emirates |
| 21:30 UTC+3:30 | | Report | Laporte 81' | Stadium: Rashid (Note: Esteghlal played their home matches at Rashid Stadium, Dubai due to security concerns relating to the 2024 Iran–Israel conflict.); Attendance: 7,600; Referee: Adham Makhadmeh (Jordan) |

| 4 November 2024 4 | Al-Hilal (Saudi Arabia) | 3–0 | (Iran) Esteghlal | Riyadh, Saudi Arabia |
| 21:00 UTC+3 | Mitrović 15', 33', 74' | Report | | Stadium: Kingdom Arena; Attendance: 17,840; Referee: Ko Hyung-jin (South Korea) |

| 25 November 2024 5 | Esteghlal (Iran) | 0–0 | (Uzbekistan) Pakhtakor | Dubai, United Arab Emirates |
| 21:30 UTC+3:30 | | Report | | Stadium: Rashid; Attendance: 1,208; Referee: Qasim Al Hatmi (Oman) |

| 2 December 2024 6 | Al-Ahli (Saudi Arabia) | 2–2 | (Iran) Esteghlal | Jeddah, Saudi Arabia |
| 19:00 UTC+3 | Toney 45+8' (pen.), 86' (pen.) | Report | Silva 42'; Eslami 51' | Stadium: King Abdullah; Attendance: 16,099; Referee: Ma Ning (China) |

| 3 February 2025 7 | Esteghlal (Iran) | 1–1 | (Iraq) Al-Shorta | Dubai, United Arab Emirates |
| 21:30 UTC+3:30 | Kojo 4' | Report | Amin 49' | Stadium: Rashid; Attendance: 54,873; Referee: Yusuke Araki (Japan) |

| 18 February 2025 8 | Al-Rayyan (Qatar) | 0–2 | (Iran) Esteghlal | Al Rayyan, Qatar |
| 19:00 UTC+3 | | Report | Azadi 46'; Koushki 69' | Stadium: Ahmad bin Ali; Attendance: 3,712; Referee: Sadullo Gulmurodi (Tajikistan) |

==== Round of 16 ====
| 3 March 2025 First leg | Esteghlal (Iran) | 0–0 | (Saudi Arabia) Al-Nassr | Tehran, Iran |
| 19:30 UTC+3:30 | | Report | | Stadium: Azadi Stadium; Attendance: 75,130; Referee: Ahmed Al-Kaf (Oman) |

| 10 March 2025 Second leg | Al-Nassr (Saudi Arabia) | 3–0 (3–0 agg.) | (Iran) Esteghlal | Riyadh, Saudi Arabia |
| 21:00 UTC+3 | Durán 9', 84'; Ronaldo 27' (pen.) | Report | | Stadium: King Saud University Stadium; Attendance: 23,256; Referee: Ilgiz Tantashev (Uzbekistan) |

== Statistics ==
=== Squad statistics ===
| No. | Pos | Nat | Player | Total | | Pro League | | Hazfi Cup | | ACL Elite | |
| No. | Pos | Nat | Player | Apps | Goals | Apps | Goals | Apps | Goals | Apps | Goals |
|---|---|---|---|---|---|---|---|---|---|---|---|
| 1 | GK | (Iran) | Hossein Hosseini | 42 | 0 | 27 | 0 | 5 | 0 | 10 | 0 |
| 2 | DF | (Iran) | Mohammad Hossein Moradmand | 21 | 0 | 17 | 0 | 1 | 0 | 3 | 0 |
| 4 | MF | (Iran) | Rouzbeh Cheshmi | 33 | 1 | 20 | 0 | 5 | 1 | 8 | 0 |
| 6 | DF | (Iran) | Iman Salimi | 13 | 0 | 6 | 0 | 2 | 0 | 5 | 0 |
| 7 | FW | (Iran) | Mehrdad Mohammadi | 6 | 1 | 2 | 1 | 1 | 0 | 3 | 0 |
| 9 | FW | (Iran) | Mohammad Reza Azadi | 18 | 3 | 11 | 1 | 3 | 1 | 4 | 1 |
| 10 | DF | (Iran) | Ramin Rezaeian | 42 | 13 | 28 | 10 | 4 | 2 | 10 | 1 |
| 11 | FW | (Kyrgyzstan) | Joel Kojo | 17 | 3 | 11 | 2 | 3 | 0 | 3 | 1 |
| 12 | GK | (Iran) | Mohammad Reza Khaledabadi | 3 | 0 | 3 | 0 | 0 | 0 | 0 | 0 |
| 14 | MF | (Iran) | Zobeir Niknafs | 27 | 0 | 18 | 0 | 2 | 0 | 7 | 0 |
| 15 | MF | (Iran) | Abolfazl Zamani | 16 | 1 | 10 | 1 | 3 | 0 | 3 | 0 |
| 20 | FW | (Iran) | Alireza Koushki | 33 | 4 | 23 | 2 | 3 | 1 | 7 | 1 |
| 22 | MF | (Gabon) | Didier Ndong | 42 | 0 | 28 | 0 | 4 | 0 | 10 | 0 |
| 27 | DF | (Iran) | Saleh Hardani | 19 | 0 | 12 | 0 | 3 | 0 | 4 | 0 |
| 28 | FW | (Iran) | Mojtaba Hasheminasab | 1 | 0 | 1 | 0 | 0 | 0 | 0 | 0 |
| 33 | DF | (Iran) | Abolfazl Jalali | 34 | 1 | 23 | 1 | 4 | 0 | 7 | 0 |
| 44 | DF | (Iran) | Armin Sohrabian | 18 | 0 | 11 | 0 | 3 | 0 | 4 | 0 |
| 55 | DF | (Brazil) | Raphael Silva | 38 | 3 | 26 | 2 | 4 | 0 | 8 | 1 |
| 66 | MF | (Iran) | Zargham Saadavi | 5 | 0 | 1 | 0 | 3 | 0 | 1 | 0 |
| 70 | MF | (Iran) | Mehdi Bahraminejad | 1 | 0 | 1 | 0 | 0 | 0 | 0 | 0 |
| 77 | FW | (Uzbekistan) | Jaloliddin Masharipov | 34 | 1 | 24 | 1 | 2 | 0 | 8 | 0 |
| 80 | FW | (Iran) | Mohammad Hossein Eslami | 30 | 4 | 20 | 3 | 4 | 0 | 6 | 1 |
| 87 | MF | (Iran) | Mehran Ahmadi | 16 | 0 | 10 | 0 | 2 | 0 | 4 | 0 |
| 88 | MF | (Iran) | Arash Rezavand | 35 | 1 | 23 | 0 | 4 | 0 | 8 | 1 |
| 91 | FW | (Kenya) | Masoud Juma | 17 | 3 | 11 | 2 | 4 | 1 | 2 | 0 |
| 93 | FW | (Iran) | Hesam Eskandari | 3 | 0 | 1 | 0 | 1 | 0 | 1 | 0 |
| 99 | FW | (Iran) | Amirali Sadeghi | 13 | 1 | 9 | 1 | 2 | 0 | 2 | 0 |
Players transferred/loaned out during the season
| 3 | DF | (Iran) | Saman Fallah | 14 | 0 | 9 | 0 | 0 | 0 | 5 | 0 |
| 18 | DF | (Iran) | Milad Zakipour | 21 | 0 | 14 | 0 | 1 | 0 | 6 | 0 |
| 19 | FW | (Argentina) | Gustavo Blanco Leschuk | 17 | 1 | 11 | 0 | 1 | 1 | 5 | 0 |
| 21 | MF | (Democratic Republic of the Congo) | Gaël Kakuta | 18 | 0 | 13 | 0 | 1 | 0 | 4 | 0 |
| 23 | FW | (Iran) | Arman Ramezani | 17 | 1 | 12 | 1 | 1 | 0 | 4 | 0 |

Last updated: 15 May 2025
Source: Competitions

=== Goals ===
The list is sorted by shirt number when total goals are equal.

| Rank | Player | Pro League | Hazfi Cup | ACL Elite | Total |
|---|---|---|---|---|---|
| 1 | (Iran) Ramin Rezaeian | 10 | 2 | 1 | 13 |
| 2 | (Iran) Mohammad Hossein Eslami | 3 | 0 | 1 | 4 |
| 2 | (Iran) Alireza Koushki | 2 | 1 | 1 | 4 |
| 4 | (Brazil) Raphael Silva | 2 | 0 | 1 | 3 |
| 4 | (Kyrgyzstan) Joel Kojo | 2 | 0 | 1 | 3 |
| 4 | (Kenya) Masoud Juma | 2 | 1 | 0 | 3 |
| 4 | (Iran) Mohammad Reza Azadi | 1 | 1 | 1 | 3 |
| 5 | (Iran) Arman Ramezani | 1 | 0 | 0 | 1 |
| 5 | (Iran) Abolfazl Jalali | 1 | 0 | 0 | 1 |
| 5 | (Iran) Mehrdad Mohammadi | 1 | 0 | 0 | 1 |
| 5 | (Iran) Abolfazl Zamani | 1 | 0 | 0 | 1 |
| 5 | (Iran) Amirali Sadeghi | 1 | 0 | 0 | 1 |
| 5 | (Uzbekistan) Jaloliddin Masharipov | 1 | 0 | 0 | 1 |
| 5 | (Iran) Arash Rezavand | 0 | 0 | 1 | 1 |
| 5 | (Argentina) Gustavo Blanco | 0 | 1 | 0 | 1 |
| 5 | (Iran) Rouzbeh Cheshmi | 0 | 1 | 0 | 1 |
| Own goals | | 2 | 0 | 1 | 3 |
| Total | | 30 | 7 | 8 | 45 |

Last updated: 15 May 2025.
Source: Competitive matches

=== Clean sheets ===
| Rank | Player | Pro League | Hazfi Cup | ACL Elite | Total |
|---|---|---|---|---|---|
| 1 | (Iran) Hossein Hosseini | 8 | 4 | 4 | 16 |
| 2 | (Iran) Mohammad Reza Khaledabadi | 1 | 0 | 0 | 1 |
| Total | | 9 | 4 | 4 | 17 |

Last updated: 29 May 2025.
Source: Competitive matches
