= 2025–26 Esteghlal F.C. season =

Esteghlal
2025–26 season
- President: Ali Nazari Juybari (from 8 January 2025 to 13 August 2025); Ali Tajernia (from 13 August 2025)
- Head coach: Ricardo Sá Pinto (until 19 February 2026); Voria Ghafouri (caretaker, overseeing one match); Sohrab Bakhtiarizadeh (from 21 February 2026)
- Stadium: Azadi Stadium
- Persian Gulf Pro League: 1st (Week 22)
- Hazfi Cup: Pre-season
- AFC Champions League Two: Round of 16
- Iranian Super Cup: Runner-up
Home colours	Away colours

The 2025–26 Esteghlal Football Club season is the 80th season and the club's 32nd consecutive season in the top flight of Iranian football. In addition to the domestic league, Esteghlal are participating in this season's editions of the Hazfi Cup, Iranian Super Cup and AFC Champions League Two.

== Players ==
Last updated: 30 January 2026

No.	Name	Nat	Position	Date of Birth (Age)	Since	End	Signed from
Goalkeepers
1	Antonio Adán	(Spain)	GK	13 May 1987 (aged 38)	2025	2026	Unattached
60	Aria Hosseinifar	(Iran)	GK	26 December 2004 (aged 21)	2025		(Iran) Youth Sector
76	Habib Far Abbasi	(Iran)	GK	4 September 1997 (aged 28)	2025	2027	(Iran) Zob Ahan
Defenders
2	Saleh Hardani	(Iran)	RB / RW	26 December 1998 (aged 27)	2025	2027	(Iran) Sepahan
3	Armin Sohrabian	(Iran)	CB	26 July 1995 (aged 30)	2025	2026	(Iran) Nassaji
5	Rustamjon Ashurmatov	(Uzbekistan)	CB	7 July 1996 (aged 29)	2025	2027	(Russia) Rubin Kazan
10	Ramin Rezaeian	(Iran)	RB / RW	21 March 1990 (aged 35)	2024	2027	(Iran) Sepahan
18	Abolfazl Zoleikhaei	(Iran)	LB / LM	9 March 2006 (aged 19)	2025	2030	Unattached
19	Saman Fallah	(Iran)	CB	12 May 2001 (aged 24)	2024	2027	(Iran) Gol Gohar
23	Aref Aghasi	(Iran)	CB	2 January 1997 (aged 28)	2025	2027	(Iran) Tractor
27	Hossein Goudarzi	(Iran)	LB / LM	4 May 2001 (aged 24)	2025	2028	(Iran) Sepahan
33	Abolfazl Jalali	(Iran)	LB / LM	26 June 1998 (aged 27)	2021	2026	(Iran) Saipa
55	Aref Gholami	(Iran)	CB	19 April 1997 (aged 28)	2025	2026	(Iran) Tractor
Midfielders
4	Rouzbeh Cheshmi	(Iran)	DM / CB	24 July 1993 (aged 32)	2021	2026	(Qatar) Umm Salal
8	Amir Mohammad Razzaghinia	(Iran)	CM / AM	11 April 2006 (aged 19)	2025	2028	(Iran) Kheybar
15	Abolfazl Zamani	(Iran)	CM / RB	1 March 2006 (aged 19)	2024	2027	(Iran) Paykan
66	Zargham Saadavi	(Iran)	DM / CB	31 May 2006 (aged 19)	2024	2028	(Iran) Foolad
88	Mehran Ahmadi	(Iran)	AM / RW	26 December 1997 (aged 28)	2025	2027	(Iran) Kheybar
Forwards
7	Mohammad Reza Azadi	(Iran)	ST	7 December 1999 (aged 26)	2025	2027	(United Arab Emirates) Al Urooba
9	Duckens Nazon	(Haiti)	ST	7 April 1994 (aged 31)	2025	2028	(Turkey) Kayserispor
11	Saeid Saharkhizan	(Iran)	ST	26 June 2003 (aged 22)	2025	2028	(Russia) Orenburg
12	Moussa Djenepo	(Mali)	LW / RW	15 June 1998 (aged 27)	2025	2027	(Belgium) Standard Liège
17	Munir El Haddadi	(Morocco)	RW / ST / LW	1 September 1995 (aged 30)	2025	2027	Unattached
20	Alireza Koushki	(Iran)	LW / RW	16 February 2000 (aged 25)	2024	2026	(Iran) Gol Gohar
70	Jasir Asani	(Albania)	RW / LW	19 May 1995 (aged 30)	2025	2027	(South Korea) Gwangju
77	Jaloliddin Masharipov	(Uzbekistan)	LW / RW	1 September 1993 (aged 32)	2024	2027	(Greece) Panserraikos
80	Mohammad Hossein Eslami	(Iran)	RW / LW	13 April 2001 (aged 24)	2024	2026	(Iran) Zob Ahan
87	Esmaeil Gholizadeh	(Iran)	LW	18 February 2006 (aged 19)	2025	2029	(Iran) Shams Azar
93	Hesam Eskandari	(Iran)	ST	21 April 2004 (aged 21)	2023		(Iran) Youth Sector

== Transfers ==
=== In ===
Date	Pos.	Player	From	Type	Ref.
31 May 2025	DF	(Iran) Saman Fallah	Malavan	End of loan	
11 June 2025	MF	(Iran) Amir Mohammad Razzaghinia	Gol Gohar	Transfer	
12 June 2025	DF	(Iran) Aref Aghasi	Tractor	Transfer	
1 July 2025	GK	(Iran) Aria Hosseinifar	Esteghlal U21	Transfer	
2 July 2025	DF	(Iran) Esmaeil Gholizadeh	Shams Azar	Transfer	
9 July 2025	GK	(Iran) Habib Far Abbasi	Zob Ahan	Transfer	
9 July 2025	DF	(Uzbekistan) Rustamjon Ashurmatov	(Russia) Rubin Kazan	Transfer	
31 July 2025	DF	(Iran) Hossein Goudarzi	Sepahan	Transfer	
31 July 2025	FW	(Albania) Jasir Asani	(South Korea) Gwangju	Transfer	
6 August 2025	GK	(Spain) Antonio Adán	Unattached	Transfer	
7 August 2025	FW	(Iran) Saeid Saharkhizan	(Russia) Orenburg	Transfer	
10 August 2025	FW	(Haiti) Duckens Nazon	(Turkey) Kayserispor	Transfer	
19 August 2025	DF	(Iran) Aref Gholami	Tractor	Transfer	
21 August 2025	FW	(Mali) Moussa Djenepo	(Belgium) Standard Liège	Transfer	
6 September 2025	FW	(Morocco) Munir El Haddadi	Unattached	Transfer	

=== Out ===
Date	Pos.	Player	To	Type	Ref.
19 August 2025	DF	(Brazil) Raphael Silva	(Saudi Arabia) Al-Faisaly	End of Contract	
1 July 2025	DF	(Iran) Mohammad Hossein Moradmand	Unattached	End of Contract	
1 July 2025	MF	(Iran) Zobeir Niknafs	Fajr Sepasi	End of Contract	
1 July 2025	MF	(Iran) Mehdi Bahraminejad	Unattached	End of Contract	
1 July 2025	FW	(Iran) Amir Mohammad Mardi	Unattached	End of Contract	
14 July 2025	MF	(Iran) Arash Rezavand	Sepahan	End of Contract	
22 July 2025	FW	(Iran) Mehrdad Mohammadi	Tractor	End of Contract	
23 July 2025	GK	(Iran) Hossein Hosseini	Sepahan	End of Contract	
24 July 2025	FW	(Kenya) Masoud Juma	(Kenya) Migori	Transfer	
25 July 2025	FW	(Kyrgyzstan) Joel Kojo	(Uzbekistan) Neftchi	Loan	
26 July 2025	MF	(Iran) Amirali Sadeghi	Esteghlal Khuzestan	Transfer	
2 August 2025	DF	(Iran) Iman Salimi	Mes Rafsanjan	Transfer	
4 August 2025	GK	(Iran) Mohammad Reza Khaledabadi	Shams Azar	Transfer	
20 August 2025	GK	(Iran) Amirhossein Nikpour	Unattached	Contract termination	
1 September 2025	FW	(Iran) Mojtaba Hasheminasab	Nirooye Zamini	Loan	

=== Contract renewals ===
Date	Pos.	Name	Contract length	Contract ends	Ref.
2 July 2024	DF	(Iran) Ramin Rezaeian	1-year	2026	
12 July 2024	MF	(Iran) Rouzbeh Cheshmi	1-year	2026	

== Competitions ==
=== Overview ===
Competition	First match	Last match	Starting round	Final position	Record							
Competition	First match	Last match	Starting round	Final position	Pld	W	D	L	GF	GA	GD	Win %
Persian Gulf Pro League	19 August 2025	27 February 2026	Matchday 1	1st (ongoing)	22	11	8	3	29	16	+13	50.00
Hazfi Cup	21 November 2025	13 January 2026	Round of 32	Round of 8 (ongoing)	2	2	0	0	4	1	+3	100.00
ACL Two	17 September 2025	17 February 2026	Group stage	Round of 16	8	2	2	4	10	14	−4	25.00
Iranian Super Cup	11 August 2025		Final	Runner-up	1	0	0	1	1	2	−1	0.00
Total					33	15	10	8	44	33	+11	45.45

Last updated: 27 February 2026
Source: Soccerway

=== Persian Gulf Pro League ===
==== Standings ====
Pos	Team	Pld	W	D	L	GF	GA	GD	Pts	Qualification or relegation
1	Esteghlal	22	11	8	3	29	16	+13	41	Qualification for the 2026–27 AFC Champions League Elite league stage
2	Tractor	22	10	9	3	30	12	+18	39	Qualification for the 2026–27 AFC Champions League Elite league stage
3	Sepahan	22	11	6	5	24	13	+11	39	
4	Gol Gohar	23	11	6	6	26	19	+7	39	Qualification for the 2026–27 AFC Champions League Two group stage (Note: 2025–26 Persian Gulf Pro League was abandoned due to the Iran-Israel war, and the AFC Champions League Two slot was determined through a play-off between the third to sixth-placed teams. The third-placed team (Sepahan Isfahan) failed to obtain club license required to enter the competition and was excluded from the play-offs. Consequently, a play-off was contested between the fourth to sixth-placed teams, with Chadormalu Ardakan emerging as the winner. However AFC had already received fourth-placed team Gol Gohar as the official replacement submitted by the Iran Football Federation before the play-offs.)
5	Persepolis	22	9	7	6	23	19	+4	34	

Updated to match(es) played on 22 February 2026. Source: Iran Football League Organization - League Full Table
Rules for classification: 1) Points; 2) Head-to-head points; 3) Head-to-head goal difference; 4) Total goal difference; 5) Total goals scored; 6) Fair-play points.
(Note: Head-to-head record is used only after all the matches between the teams in question have been played).
