= 2026–27 Esteghlal F.C. season =

Esteghlal
2026–27 season
- President: Ali Tajernia
- Head coach: Sohrab Bakhtiarizadeh
- Stadium: Azadi Stadium
- Persian Gulf Pro League: Pre-season
- Hazfi Cup: Pre-season
- AFC Champions League Elite: Pre-season
| Home colours | Away colours |

The 2026–27 Esteghlal Football Club season is the 81st season and the club's 33rd consecutive season in the top flight of Iranian football. In addition to the domestic league, Esteghlal are participating in this season's editions of the Hazfi Cup and AFC Champions League Elite.

== Kits ==
- Supplier: (Iran) Start

| Home | Away | Asian Competition |

== Players ==
Last updated: 22 October 2026

| No. | Name | Nat | Position | Date of Birth (Age) | Since | End | Signed from |
Goalkeepers
| 40 | Ahoora Nabizadeh | (Iran) | GK | 6 September 2006 (aged 20) | 2026 | | (Iran) Youth Sector |
| 60 | Aria Hosseinifar | (Iran) | GK | 26 December 2004 (aged 22) | 2025 | | (Iran) Youth Sector |
| 76 | Habib Far Abbasi | (Iran) | GK | 4 September 1997 (aged 29) | 2025 | 2027 | (Iran) Zob Ahan |
Defenders
| 2 | Saleh Hardani | (Iran) | RB / RW | 26 December 1998 (aged 28) | 2025 | 2027 | (Iran) Sepahan |
| 5 | Rustamjon Ashurmatov | (Uzbekistan) | CB | 7 July 1996 (aged 30) | 2025 | 2027 | (Russia) Rubin Kazan |
| 6 | Saman Fallah | (Iran) | CB | 12 May 2001 (aged 25) | 2024 | 2027 | (Iran) Gol Gohar |
| 18 | Abolfazl Zoleikhaei | (Iran) | LB / LM | 9 March 2006 (aged 20) | 2025 | 2030 | Unattached |
| 22 | Saman Touranian | (Iran) | RB / RM | 12 December 2001 (aged 25) | 2023 | 2028 | (Iran) Mes Kerman |
| 27 | Hossein Goudarzi | (Iran) | LB / LM | 4 May 2001 (aged 25) | 2025 | 2028 | (Iran) Sepahan |
| 33 | Aref Aghasi | (Iran) | CB | 2 January 1997 (aged 29) | 2025 | 2027 | (Iran) Tractor |
| 44 | Iliya Ebrahimi | (Iran) | CB | 4 May 2001 (aged 25) | 2026 | | (Iran) Youth Sector |
| 45 | Hossein Gharloghi | (Iran) | RB / RM | 29 May 2005 (aged 21) | 2026 | | (Iran) Youth Sector |
Midfielders
| 4 | Rouzbeh Cheshmi | (Iran) | DM / CB | 24 July 1993 (aged 33) | 2021 | 2027 | (Qatar) Umm Salal |
| 8 | Amir Mohammad Razzaghinia | (Iran) | CM / AM / DM | 11 April 2006 (aged 20) | 2025 | 2028 | (Iran) Kheybar |
| 15 | Abolfazl Zamani | (Iran) | CM / DM | 1 March 2006 (aged 20) | 2024 | 2027 | (Iran) Paykan |
| 26 | Mahdi Ghayedi Heydari | (Iran) | AM / LW | 18 April 2005 (aged 21) | 2026 | | (Iran) Youth Sector |
| 36 | Alireza Mohebali | (Iran) | CM / DM | 19 August 2005 (aged 21) | 2026 | | (Iran) Youth Sector |
| 87 | Esmaeil Gholizadeh | (Iran) | AM / LW | 18 February 2006 (aged 20) | 2025 | 2029 | (Iran) Shams Azar |
| 88 | Mehran Ahmadi | (Iran) | AM / RW | 26 December 1997 (aged 29) | 2025 | 2027 | (Iran) Kheybar |
Forwards
| 7 | Jasir Asani | (Albania) | RW / LW | 19 May 1995 (aged 31) | 2025 | 2027 | (South Korea) Gwangju |
| 9 | Mohammad Reza Azadi | (Iran) | ST | 7 December 1999 (aged 27) | 2025 | 2027 | (United Arab Emirates) Al Urooba |
| 10 | Jaloliddin Masharipov | (Uzbekistan) | LW / AM | 1 September 1993 (aged 33) | 2024 | 2027 | (Greece) Panserraikos |
| 11 | Saeid Saharkhizan | (Iran) | ST | 26 June 2003 (aged 23) | 2025 | 2028 | (Russia) Orenburg |
| 20 | Alireza Koushki | (Iran) | LW / RW | 16 February 2000 (aged 26) | 2024 | 2028 | (Iran) Gol Gohar |
| 30 | Abolfazl Norouzi | (Iran) | LW / RW | 21 April 2004 (aged 22) | 2026 | 2029 | (Iran) Tractor |
| 37 | Ehsan Kheradpisheh | (Iran) | ST | 1 April 2008 (aged 18) | 2026 | | (Iran) Youth Sector |
| 80 | Mohammad Hossein Eslami | (Iran) | RW / LW | 13 April 2001 (aged 25) | 2024 | 2028 | (Iran) Zob Ahan |

== Transfers ==
=== In ===
| Date | Pos. | Player | From | Type | Ref. |
|---|---|---|---|---|---|
| 1 July 2026 | DF | (Iran) Ramin Rezaeian | Foolad | End of loan | |
| 21 July 2026 | DF | (Iran) Bahram Goudarzi | Aluminium Arak | Transfer | |
| 25 July 2026 | GK | (Iran) Mohammad Khalifeh | Aluminium Arak | Transfer | |

=== Out ===
| Date | Pos. | Player | To | Type | Ref. |
|---|---|---|---|---|---|
| 1 July 2026 | FW | (Kyrgyzstan) Joel Kojo | (Uzbekistan) Navbahor | Contract termination | |
| 1 July 2026 | DF | (Gabon) Didier Ndong | Unattached | Contract termination | |
| 1 July 2026 | FW | (Mali) Moussa Djenepo | Unattached | Contract termination | |
| 1 July 2026 | DF | (Iran) Aref Gholami | Unattached | End of Contract | |
| 14 July 2026 | MF | (Morocco) Munir El Haddadi | Unattached | Contract termination | |
| 20 July 2026 | FW | (Haiti) Duckens Nazon | Unattached | Contract termination | |
| 23 July 2026 | DF | (Iran) Ramin Rezaeian | Unattached | Contract termination | |
| 1 July 2026 | GK | (Spain) Antonio Adán | Unattached | End of Contract | |
| 10 July 2026 | DF | (Iran) Abolfazl Jalali | Persepolis | End of Contract | |
| 20 July 2026 | DF | (Iran) Armin Sohrabian | Sepahan | End of Contract | |
