= 2020–21 Gol Gohar F.C. season =

Gol Gohar Sirjan F.C.
2020–21 season
- Chairman: Vahid Irannezhad
- Manager: Amir Ghalenoei
- Stadium: Imam Ali Stadium
- Pro League: 5th
- Hazfi Cup: Semi-final
- Top goalscorer: League: Godwin Mensha (14); All: Godwin Mensha (15)
- Average home league attendance: 0 (Note: All matches were played behind closed doors.)
| Home colours | Away colours |

The 2020–21 season is the Gol Gohar Football Club's 2nd season in the Iran Pro League. They will also competing in the Hazfi Cup.

== Players ==
=== First team squad ===
Last updated: 2 August 2020

Note: Flags indicate national team as defined under FIFA eligibility rules; some limited exceptions apply. Players may hold more than one non-FIFA nationality.

| No. | Pos. | Nation | Player |
|---|---|---|---|
| 1 | GK | IRI | Alireza Haghighi |
| 2 | DF | IRI | Reza Sharbati |
| 3 | DF | IRI | Armin Sohrabian |
| 4 | MF | IRI | Alireza Alizadeh |
| 5 | DF | IRI | Alireza Ebrahimi |
| 6 | DF | IRI | Mehran Golzari (captain) |
| 7 | FW | IRI | Behnam Barzay |
| 8 | MF | IRI | Ali Asghar Ashouri |
| 14 | MF | IRI | Mehrdad Zarei |
| 18 | DF | IRI | Milad Zakipour |
| 20 | FW | IRI | Younes Shakeri |
| 21 | FW | IRI | Saeid Sadeghi |
| 16 | DF | IRI | Seyed reza hosseini ^{U23} |

| No. | Pos. | Nation | Player |
|---|---|---|---|
| 28 | MF | IRI | Mohsen Karimi |
| 55 | DF | IRI | Alireza Arta |
| 60 | MF | IRI | Ahmad Reza Zendehrouh |
| 66 | MF | IRI | Amir Zeydabadi ^{U21} |
| 25 | MF | IRI | Erfan afraz ^{U21} |
| 77 | GK | IRI | Mehrdad Bashagerdi |
| 88 | MF | IRI | Amin Pourali |
| 90 | FW | NGR | Godwin Mensha |
| — | FW | IRI | Morteza Tabrizi |
| — | MF | IRI | Farshid Bagheri |
| — | MF | IRI | Ali Dashti |
| — | DF | IRI | Amirhossein Kargar^{U23} |

== Transfers ==
=== Summer ===
In:

| No. | Pos. | Nation | Player |
|---|---|---|---|
| — | MF | IRI | Mohammad Miri (from Nassaji) |
| — | MF | IRI | Alireza Alizadeh (from Naft MIS) |
| — | MF | IRI | Ali Asghar Ashouri (from Nassaji) |
| — | DF | IRI | Alireza Arta (from Mes Kerman) |
| — | GK | IRI | Alireza Haghighi (from Nassaji) |
| — | MF | IRI | Saeid Sadeghi (from Shahr Khodro) |
| — | DF | IRI | Armin Sohrabian (from Saipa) |
| — | DF | IRI | Reza Sharbati (from Foolad) |
| — | FW | IRI | Mohsen Karimi (from Esteghlal) |
| — | DF | IRI | Milad Zakipour (from Esteghlal) |
| — | DF | IRI | Amirhossein Kargar^{U23} (from Esteghlal) |

Out:

| No. | Pos. | Nation | Player |
|---|---|---|---|
| 1 | GK | IRI | Milad Farahani (to Shahr Khodro) |
| 2 | DF | IRI | Ahmad Mousavi (to Esteghlal) |
| 25 | MF | IRI | Milad Kamandani (to Nassaji) |
| 70 | FW | IRI | Sajjad Ashouri (to Mes Rafsanjan) |
| 9 | FW | IRI | Mehrdad Bayrami (to Nassaji) |
| 99 | FW | IRI | Farshad Biabani (to Machine Sazi) |
| 3 | DF | IRI | Abdollah Hosseini (to Zob Ahan) |

=== winter ===
In:

| No. | Pos. | Nation | Player |
|---|---|---|---|
| — | FW | IRI | Morteza Tabrizi (from Esteghlal) |
| — | MF | IRI | Farshid Bagheri (from Esteghlal) |
| — | MF | IRI | Ali Dashti (from Zob Ahan) |

Out:

| No. | Pos. | Nation | Player |
|---|---|---|---|
| — | DF | IRI | Yousef Vakia (to Padideh) |
| — | DF | IRI | Hesam Pourhashem (to Padideh) |
| — | FW | IRI | Ali Ghorbankhani (to Paykan) |
| — | MF | IRI | Reza Shekari (to Tractor) |
| — | FW | IRI | Peyman Ranjbari (to Zob Ahan) |
| — | MF | IRI | Amirreza Mahmoudabadi (to Zob Ahan) |

== Competitions ==
=== Overview ===
| Competition | First match | Last match | Starting round | Final position | Record | | | | | | | |
| Competition | First match | Last match | Starting round | Final position | Pld | W | D | L | GF | GA | GD | Win % |
|---|---|---|---|---|---|---|---|---|---|---|---|---|
| Pro League | 7 November 2020 | 30 July 2021 | — | 5th | 30 | 13 | 6 | 11 | 33 | 32 | +1 | 43.33 |
| Hazfi Cup | 11 March 2021 | 4 August 2021 | Round of 32 | Semi-final | 4 | 3 | 0 | 1 | 9 | 4 | +5 | 75.00 |
| Total | | | | | 34 | 16 | 6 | 12 | 42 | 36 | +6 | 47.06 |

Last updated: 21 August 2021.
Source: Competitions

=== Persian Gulf Pro League ===
==== Standings ====
| Pos | Team | Pld | W | D | L | GF | GA | GD | Pts | Qualification or relegation |
|---|---|---|---|---|---|---|---|---|---|---|
| 3 | Esteghlal (Note: Persepolis and Esteghlal did not obtain an AFC license. Therefore, even if they earn the right to play in Asian competitions based on league position, they will not be able to participate.) | 30 | 16 | 8 | 6 | 36 | 19 | +17 | 56 | |
| 4 | Tractor | 30 | 12 | 9 | 9 | 35 | 29 | +6 | 45 | |
| 5 | Gol Gohar | 30 | 13 | 6 | 11 | 33 | 32 | +1 | 45 | |
| 6 | Foolad | 30 | 10 | 14 | 6 | 27 | 18 | +9 | 44 | Qualification for 2022 AFC Champions League group stage (Note: Foolad qualified to AFC Champions League by winning the Hazfi Cup) |
| 7 | Paykan | 30 | 9 | 13 | 8 | 32 | 30 | +2 | 40 | |

Updated to match(es) played on 30 July 2021. Source: IPL Table, Soccerway
Rules for classification: 1) Points; 2) Goal difference; 3) Goals scored.

==== Results summary ====
| Overall | | | | | | | | Home | | | | | | Away | | | | | |
| Pld | W | D | L | GF | GA | GD | Pts | W | D | L | GF | GA | GD | W | D | L | GF | GA | GD |
|---|---|---|---|---|---|---|---|---|---|---|---|---|---|---|---|---|---|---|---|
| 30 | 13 | 6 | 11 | 33 | 32 | +1 | 45 | 7 | 4 | 4 | 20 | 18 | +2 | 6 | 2 | 7 | 13 | 14 | −1 |

Last updated: 21 August 2021.
Source: Ipl Stats

==== Results by round ====
| Round | 1 | 2 | 3 | 4 | 5 | 6 | 7 | 8 | 9 | 10 | 11 | 12 | 13 | 14 | 15 | 16 | 17 | 18 | 19 | 20 | 21 | 22 | 23 | 24 | 25 | 26 | 27 | 28 | 29 | 30 |
|---|---|---|---|---|---|---|---|---|---|---|---|---|---|---|---|---|---|---|---|---|---|---|---|---|---|---|---|---|---|---|
| Ground | H | A | H | A | H | A | H | A | H | H | A | H | A | H | A | A | H | A | H | A | H | A | H | A | A | H | A | H | A | H |
| Result | W | W | D | W | L | L | W | D | L | L | D | L | W | D | W | L | D | L | W | W | W | L | W | L | L | W | L | W | W | D |
| Position | 3 | 1 | 1 | 1 | 1 | 5 | 1 | 1 | 5 | 8 | 8 | 9 | 9 | 8 | 11 | 7 | 8 | 11 | 7 | 5 | 4 | 5 | 4 | 6 | 7 | 4 | 6 | 5 | 4 | 5 |

Updated to match(es) played on 22 August 2021. Source: "Ipl".
A = Away; H = Home; W = Win; D = Draw; L = Loss; P = Postponed

==== Matches ====
Win Draw Loss Postponed

| 7 November 2020 1 | Gol Gohar | 3–1 | Sepahan | Sirjan |
| | | Report | | Stadium: Imam Ali Stadium; Attendance: 0 (NC) |
Note: Due to the COVID-19 pandemic in Iran, the match was played behind closed doors.

| 20 November 2020 2 | Mes Rafsanjan | 0–2 | Gol Gohar | Rafsanjan |
| | | Report | | Stadium: Shohadaye Mes Rafsanjan Stadium; Attendance: 0 (NC) |
Note: Due to the COVID-19 pandemic in Iran, the match was played behind closed doors.

| 20 November 2020 3 | Gol Gohar | 1–1 | Foolad | Sirjan |
| 16:10 IRST (UTC+03:30) | | Report | | Stadium: Imam Ali Stadium; Attendance: 0 (NC) |
Note: Due to the COVID-19 pandemic in Iran, the match was played behind closed doors.

| 30 November 2020 4 | Machine Sazi | 0–1 | Gol Gohar | Tabriz |
| | | | | Stadium: Bonyan Diesel Stadium; Attendance: 0 (NC) |
Note: Due to the COVID-19 pandemic in Iran, the match was played behind closed doors.

| 7 December 2020 5 | Gol Gohar | 1–2 | Paykan | Sirjan |
| | | | | Stadium: Imam Ali Stadium; Attendance: 0 (NC) |
Note: Due to the COVID-19 pandemic in Iran, the match was played behind closed doors.

| 12 December 2020 6 | Sanat Naft | 2–1 | Gol Gohar | Abadan |
| | | | | Stadium: Takhti Stadium; Attendance: 0 (NC) |
Note: Due to the COVID-19 pandemic in Iran, the match was played behind closed doors.

| 18 December 2020 7 | Gol Gohar | 3–1 | Shahr Khodro | Sirjan |
| | | | | Stadium: Imam Ali Stadium; Attendance: 0 (NC) |
Note: Due to the COVID-19 pandemic in Iran, the match was played behind closed doors.

| 24 December 2020 8 | Zob Ahan | 1–1 | Gol Gohar | Sirjan |
| | | | | Stadium: Imam Ali Stadium; Attendance: 0 (NC) |
Note: Due to the COVID-19 pandemic in Iran, the match was played behind closed doors.

| 30 December 2020 9 | Gol Gohar | 1–2 | Esteghlal | Sirjan |
| | | | | Stadium: Imam Ali Stadium; Attendance: 0 (NC) |
Note: Due to the COVID-19 pandemic in Iran, the match was played behind closed doors.

| 19 February 2021 10 | Gol Gohar | 0–5 | Persepolis | Sirjan |
| | | | | Stadium: Imam Ali Stadium; Attendance: 0 (NC) |
Note: Due to the COVID-19 pandemic in Iran, the match was played behind closed doors.

| 15 January 2021 11 | Aluminium Arak | 0–0 | Gol Gohar | Arak |
| | | | | Stadium: Imam Khomeini Stadium; Attendance: 0 (NC) |
Note: Due to the COVID-19 pandemic in Iran, the match was played behind closed doors.

| 23 January 2021 12 | Gol Gohar | 1–2 | Tractor | Sirjan |
| | | | | Stadium: Imam Ali Stadium; Attendance: 0 (NC) |
Note: Due to the COVID-19 pandemic in Iran, the match was played behind closed doors.

| 29 January 2021 13 | Saipa | 0–1 | Gol Gohar | Tehran |
| | | | | Stadium: Shahid Dastgerdi Stadium; Attendance: 0 (NC) |
Note: Due to the COVID-19 pandemic in Iran, the match was played behind closed doors.

| 5 February 2021 14 | Gol Gohar | 0–0 | Naft Masjed Soleyman | Sirjan |
| | | | | Stadium: Imam Ali Stadium; Attendance: 0 (NC) |
Note: Due to the COVID-19 pandemic in Iran, the match was played behind closed doors.

| 13 February 2021 15 | Nassaji Mazandaran | 1–2 | Gol Gohar | Qaem Shahr |
| | | | | Stadium: Vatani Stadium; Attendance: 0 (NC) |
Note: Due to the COVID-19 pandemic in Iran, the match was played behind closed doors.

| 1 March 2021 16 | Sepahan | 1–0 | Gol Gohar | Isfahan |
| | | | | Stadium: Naghsh-e-Jahan; Attendance: 0 (NC) |
Note: Due to the COVID-19 pandemic in Iran, the match was played behind closed doors.

| 6 March 2021 17 | Gol Gohar | 0–0 | Mes Rafsanjan | Sirjan |
| | | | | Stadium: Imam Ali Stadium; Attendance: 0 (NC) |
Note: Due to the COVID-19 pandemic in Iran, the match was played behind closed doors.

| 8 May 2021 18 | Foolad | 1–0 | Gol Gohar | Ahvaz |
| | | | | Stadium: Foolad Arena; Attendance: 0 (NC) |
Note: Due to the COVID-19 pandemic in Iran, the match was played behind closed doors.

| 5 April 2021 19 | Gol Gohar | 3–1 | Machine Sazi | Sirjan |
| | | | | Stadium: Imam Ali Stadium; Attendance: 0 (NC) |
Note: Due to the COVID-19 pandemic in Iran, the match was played behind closed doors.

| 12 April 2021 20 | Paykan | 0–2 | Gol Gohar | Shahr-e Qods |
| | | | | Stadium: Shahre Qods Stadium; Attendance: 0 (NC) |
Note: Due to the COVID-19 pandemic in Iran, the match was played behind closed doors.

| 23 April 2021 21 | Gol Gohar | 1–0 | Sanat Naft | Sirjan |
| | | | | Stadium: Imam Ali Stadium; Attendance: 0 (NC) |
Note: Due to the COVID-19 pandemic in Iran, the match was played behind closed doors.

| 20 May 2021 22 | Shahr Khodro | 1–0 | Gol Gohar | Mashhad |
| | | | | Stadium: Imam Reza Stadium; Attendance: 0 (NC) |
Note: Due to the COVID-19 pandemic in Iran, the match was played behind closed doors.

| 14 May 2021 23 | Gol Gohar | 1–0 | Zob Ahan | Sirjan |
| | | | | Stadium: Imam Ali Stadium; Attendance: 0 (NC) |
Note: Due to the COVID-19 pandemic in Iran, the match was played behind closed doors.

| 25 June 2021 24 | Esteghlal | 2–0 | Gol Gohar | Tehran |
| | | | | Stadium: Azadi Stadium; Attendance: 0 (NC) |
Note: Due to the COVID-19 pandemic in Iran, the match was played behind closed doors.

| 30 June 2021 25 | Persepolis | 3–1 | Gol Gohar | Tehran |
| | | | | Stadium: Azadi Stadium; Attendance: 0 (NC) |
Note: Due to the COVID-19 pandemic in Iran, the match was played behind closed doors.

| 6 July 2021 26 | Gol Gohar | 2–1 | Aluminium Arak | Sirjan |
| | | | | Stadium: Imam Ali Stadium; Attendance: 0 (NC) |
Note: Due to the COVID-19 pandemic in Iran, the match was played behind closed doors.

| 10 July 2021 27 | Tractor | 1–0 | Gol Gohar | Tabriz |
| | | | | Stadium: Yadegar-e Emam Stadium; Attendance: 0 (NC) |
Note: Due to the COVID-19 pandemic in Iran, the match was played behind closed doors.

| 20 July 2021 28 | Gol Gohar | 1–0 | Saipa | Sirjan |
| | | | | Stadium: Imam Ali Stadium; Attendance: 0 (NC) |
Note: Due to the COVID-19 pandemic in Iran, the match was played behind closed doors.

| 25 July 2021 29 | Naft Masjed Soleyman | 1–2 | Gol Gohar | Masjed Soleyman |
| | | | | Stadium: Behnam Mohammadi Stadium; Attendance: 0 (NC) |
Note: Due to the COVID-19 pandemic in Iran, the match was played behind closed doors.

| 30 July 2021 30 | Gol Gohar | 2–2 | Nassaji Mazandaran | Sirjan |
| | | | | Stadium: Imam Ali Stadium; Attendance: 0 (NC) |
Note: Due to the COVID-19 pandemic in Iran, the match was played behind closed doors.

=== Hazfi Cup ===
| 11 March 2021 Round of 32 | Gol Gohar | 2-1 (a.e.t.) | Mes Kerman | Sirjan |
| 15:00 | Ashouri 23'; Ebrahimi 112' | Report | Safia 90+4' | Stadium: Shahid Soleymani; Referee: Seyed Reza Mahdavi |

| 29 April 2021 Round of 16 | Gol Gohar | 3-0 | Pars Jonoubi Jam | Sirjan |
| 20:30 | Mensha 30'; Shakeri 70'; Pourali 88' | Report | | Stadium: Imam Ali Stadium; Referee: Alireza Heydarpanah |

| 15 July 2021 Quarter-finals | Gol Gohar | 3-1 | Aluminium Arak | Sirjan |
| 20:30 | Shekari 72'; Zendehrouh 85' (pen.); Sadeghi 90+3' | | Abbasian 10' | Stadium: Imam Ali Stadium; Referee: Moud Bonyadifar |

| 4 August 2021 Semi-final | Esteghlal | 2–1 | Gol Gohar | Tehran |
| 19:30 IRDT (UTC+04:30) | Daneshgar (yellow card) 45'; Ghafouri 74' (pen.), 82' (pen.); Hosseini (yellow card) 90+4' | Report | Alizadeh (yellow card) 1'; Aghajanpour (yellow card) 45'; Pourali 45'; Zakipour (yellow card) 79' | Stadium: Azadi Stadium; Referee: Seyyed Vahid Kazemi |

== Statistics ==
=== Squad statistics ===
| No. | Pos | Nat | Player | Total | | Pro League | | Hazfi Cup | |
| No. | Pos | Nat | Player | Apps | Goals | Apps | Goals | Apps | Goals |

Last updated: 7 August 2020
Source: Competitions

== See also ==
- 2020–21 Persian Gulf Pro League
- 2020–21 Hazfi Cup
