= Mehran Ahmadi (footballer) =

Iranian footballer

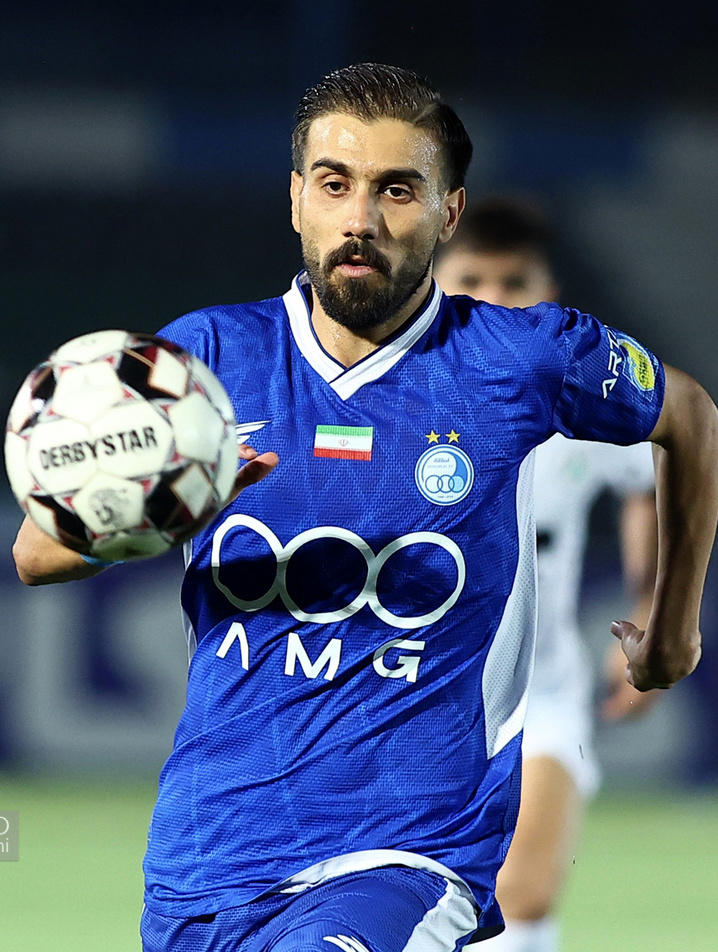
- Ahmadi with Esteghlal in 2025

Personal information
- Date of birth: 26 December 1997 (age 28)
- Place of birth: Dorud, Iran
- Height: 1.73 m (5 ft 8 in)
- Position: Midfielder

Team information
- Current team: Esteghlal
- Number: 88

Youth career
- –2016: Gahar Zagros
- 2016–2017: Be'sat Kermanshah

Senior career*
Years	Team	Apps	(Gls)
2017–2018	Be'sat Kermanshah	5	(0)
2018	Sepahan Novin	0	(0)
2018–2019	Be'sat Kermanshah	0	(0)
2019–2021	Kheybar Khorramabad	12	(3)
2021–2024	Malavan	68	(2)
2024–2025	Kheybar Khorramabad	14	(0)
2025–	Esteghlal	23	(1)

International career^{‡}
2025	Iran	2	(0)
Medal record
Representing Iran
CAFA Nations Cup
Runner-up	2025 Tajikistan–Uzbekistan	Team
- * Club domestic league appearances and goals as of 23 October 2026 ‡ National team caps and goals as of 1 September 2025

Mehran Ahmadi (Persian: مهران احمدی; born 26 December 1997) is an Iranian professional footballer who plays as an attacking midfielder for Persian Gulf Pro League club Esteghlal.

== Career statistics ==
As of 23 October 2026

Club	Season	League			Cup		continental		Other		Total	
Club	Season	League	Apps	Goals	Apps	Goals	Apps	Goals	Apps	Goals	Apps	Goals
Be'sat	2017–18	League 2	3	0	0	0	-	-	-	-	3	0
Kheybar	2019–20	League 2	11	0	1	0	-	-	-	-	12	0
Kheybar	2020–21	Azadegan League	17	3	2	0	-	-	-	-	19	3
Kheybar	Total		28	3	3	0	-	-	-	-	31	3
Malavan	2021–22	Azadegan League	8	2	0	0	-	-	-	-	8	2
Malavan	2022–23	Persian Gulf Pro League	29	2	1	0	-	-	-	-	30	2
Malavan	2023–24	Persian Gulf Pro League	27	0	3	0	-	-	-	-	30	0
Malavan	Total		64	4	4	0	0	0	0	0	68	4
Kheybar	2024–25	Persian Gulf Pro League	14	0	0	0	-	-	-	-	14	0
Esteghlal	2024–25	Persian Gulf Pro League	10	0	2	0	4	0	-	-	16	0
Esteghlal	2025–26	Persian Gulf Pro League	12	1	1	0	6	1	1	0	20	2
Esteghlal	2026–27	Persian Gulf Pro League	1	0	0	0	0	0	-	-	1	0
Esteghlal	Total		23	1	3	0	10	1	1	0	37	2
Career Total			132	8	10	0	10	1	1	0	153	9

== International career ==
Ahmadi made his debut against Afghanistan on 29 August 2025 in CAFA Championship.

=== International ===
As of match played 1 September 2025

Appearances and goals by national team and year
National team	Year	Apps	Goals
Iran
Iran	2025	2	0
Total		2	0

== Honours ==
Malavan

- Azadegan League: 2021–22

Esteghlal

- Iranian Hazfi Cup: 2024–25
