= Mohammad Hossein Eslami =

Iranian footballer

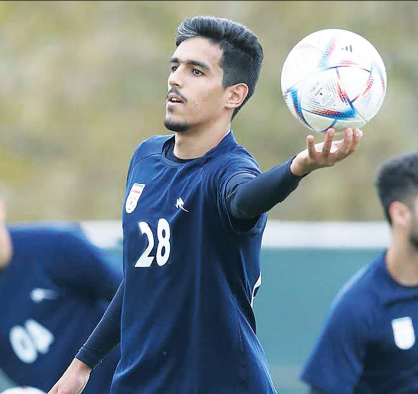

Personal information
- Full name: Mohammad Hossein Eslami
- Date of birth: April 13, 2001 (age 25)
- Place of birth: Isfahan, Iran
- Height: 1.73 m (5 ft 8 in)
- Position: Attacking midfielder

Team information
- Current team: Esteghlal
- Number: 80

Youth career
- –2021: Zob Ahan

Senior career*
Years	Team	Apps	(Gls)
2021–2024	Zob Ahan	70	(8)
2024–	Esteghlal	47	(5)

International career
2022–2023	Iran U23	7	(0)
- * Club domestic league appearances and goals as of 7 November 2026

Mohammad Hossein Eslami (Persian: محمدحسین اسلامی; born April 13, 2001) is an Iranian football midfielder who currently plays for Esteghlal in the Persian Gulf Pro League.

== Career statistics ==
=== Club ===
As of 7 November 2026

Club	Season	League			Hazfi Cup		ACL		Other		Total	
Club	Season	League	Apps	Goals	Apps	Goals	Apps	Goals	Apps	Goals	Apps	Goals
Zob Ahan	2021–22	Persian Gulf Pro League	15	1	2	0	-	-	-	-	17	1
Zob Ahan	2022–23	Persian Gulf Pro League	29	3	1	0	-	-	-	-	30	3
Zob Ahan	2023–24	Persian Gulf Pro League	26	4	2	1	-	-	-	-	28	5
Zob Ahan	Total		70	8	5	1	0	0	0	0	75	9
Esteghlal	2024–25	Persian Gulf Pro League	20	3	4	0	6	1	-	-	30	4
Esteghlal	2025–26	Persian Gulf Pro League	16	1	2	0	7	0	1	0	26	1
Esteghlal	2026–27	Persian Gulf Pro League	11	1	0	0	4	0	-	-	15	1
Esteghlal	Total		47	5	6	0	17	1	1	0	71	6
Total			117	13	11	1	17	1	1	0	146	15

== Club career ==
=== Zob Ahan ===
He made his debut for Zob Ahan in 10th fixtures of 2021–22 Persian Gulf Pro League against Havadar while he substituted in for Hossein Ebrahimi.

== Honors ==
Esteghlal

Iranian Hazfi Cup : 2024–25
