= Mohammad Reza Khaledabadi =

Iranian footballer

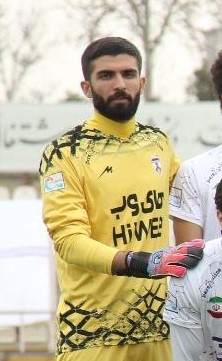

Personal information
- Full name: Mohammad Reza Khaledabadi Hesari
- Date of birth: 30 April 2001 (age 25)
- Place of birth: Karaj, Iran
- Height: 1.86 m (6 ft 1 in)
- Position: Goalkeeper

Team information
- Current team: Shams Azar
- Number: 12

Youth career
- 2015–2016: Payam Club
- 2016–2017: Aryak
- 2017–2018: Padideh Arsh Iranian
- 2018–2019: Moghavemat Tehran
- 2019–2020: Persepolis
- 2020–2022: Havadar

Senior career*
Years	Team	Apps	(Gls)
2022–2023	Havadar	17	(0)
2023–2025	Esteghlal	4	(0)
2025–	Shams Azar	7	(0)

International career^{‡}
2022–	Iran U23	7	(0)
- * Club domestic league appearances and goals as of 15 May 2025 ‡ National team caps and goals as of 12 September 2023

Mohammad Reza Khaledabadi Persian: محمدرضا خالدآبادی, (born 30 April 2001) is an Iranian footballer who currently plays for Shams Azar in the Persian Gulf Pro League.

== Career ==
=== Havadar ===
Khaledabadi joined Havadar in the summer of 2020. He made his debut on 24 December 2022 in the 13th match of the 2022–23 Persian Gulf Pro League season against Nassaji Mazandaran.

== Career statistics ==
Last Update 15 May 2025

Club performance			League		Cup		Continental		Total	
Club	Season	League	Apps	Goals	Apps	Goals	Apps	Goals	Apps	Goals
Iran			League		Hazfi Cup		Asia		Total	
Havadar	2020–21	Azadegan League	1	0	0	0	–	–	1	0
Havadar	2022–23	Pro League	16	0	4	0	—		20	0
Havadar	Total		17	0	4	0	–	–	21	0
Esteghlal	2023–24	Persian Gulf Pro League	1	0	0	0	–	–	1	0
Esteghlal	2024–25	Persian Gulf Pro League	3	0	0	0	–	–	3	0
Esteghlal	Total		4	0	0	0	–	–	4	0
Shams Azar	2025-26	Persian Gulf Pro League	0	0	1	0	-	-	1	0
Career total			21	0	5	0	0	0	26	0

== International career ==
=== Under–23 ===
In April 2022, He was invited to the Iran national under-23 football team by Mehdi Mahdavikia.

== Honours ==
Esteghlal

- Iranian Hazfi Cup: 2024–25
