= Rouzbeh Cheshmi =

Iranian footballer (born 1993)

Roozbeh Cheshmi
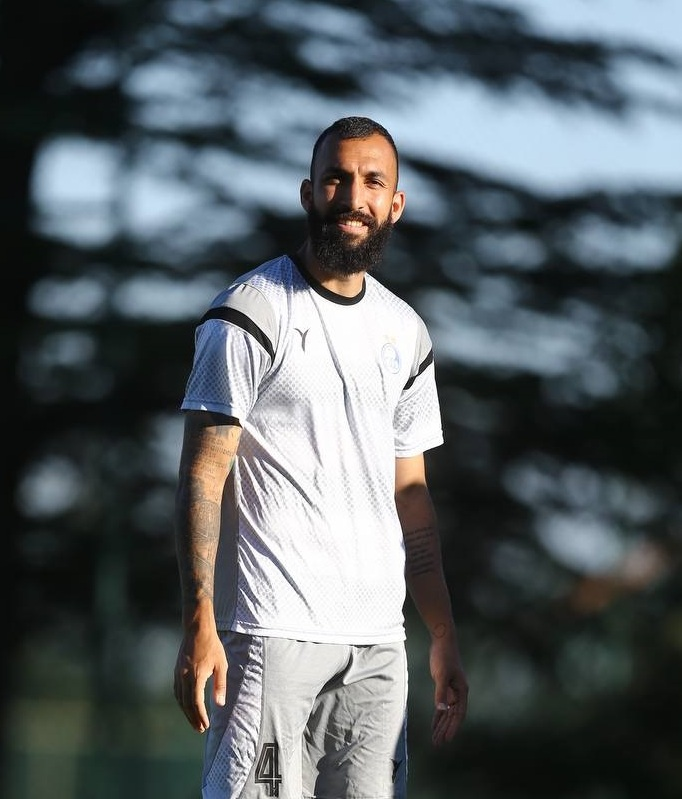

Personal information
- Date of birth: 24 July 1993 (age 33)
- Place of birth: Tehran, Iran
- Height: 1.92 m (6 ft 4 in)
- Positions: Defensive midfielder; centre-back

Team information
- Current team: Esteghlal
- Number: 4

Youth career
- 2005–2008: Paykan
- 2008–2013: Persepolis
- 2011–2013: → Moghavemat Tehran (loan)

Senior career*
Years	Team	Apps	(Gls)
2013–2015	Saba Qom	49	(1)
2015–	Esteghlal	208	(9)
2020–2021	Umm Salal	18	(1)

International career^{‡}
2008–2011	Iran U17	15	(1)
2011–2012	Iran U20	16	(2)
2014–2016	Iran U23	12	(2)
2017–	Iran	41	(3)
Medal record
Representing Iran
CAFA Nations Cup
Winner	2023 Kyrgyzstan – Uzbekistan	Team
Runner-up	2025 Tajikistan–Uzbekistan	Team
AFF U-19 Youth Championship
Winner	2012 Vietnam
- * Club domestic league appearances and goals as of 7 November 2026 ‡ National team caps and goals as of 8 September 2025

Roozbeh Cheshmi (Note: Persian: روزبه چشمی) (born 24 July 1993) is an Iranian professional footballer who plays as a defensive midfielder or a centre-back for Esteghlal in the Persian Gulf Pro League and the Iran national team.

== Early life ==
Roozbeh Cheshmi was born in Tehran to a family originally from Chesham in Sabzevar.

== Club career ==
=== Early career ===
Cheshmi began his career with Paykan, before moving to Persepolis in 2008. In 2011, he was loaned to Moghavemat Tehran to complete his mandatory military service. In 2013, Cheshmi handed a transfer request after Ali Daei asked him to have a trial with Persepolis' senior team and moved to Saba Qom. In his first season with Saba, Cheshmi made 25 appearances and scored one goal.

=== Esteghlal ===
Cheshmi signed a two-year deal with Esteghlal on 30 June 2015. He later revealed that he down offers from a Bundesliga club to join Esteghlal. Upon his arrival, he chose to wear number 4 which was previously worn by Amir Hossein Sadeghi.

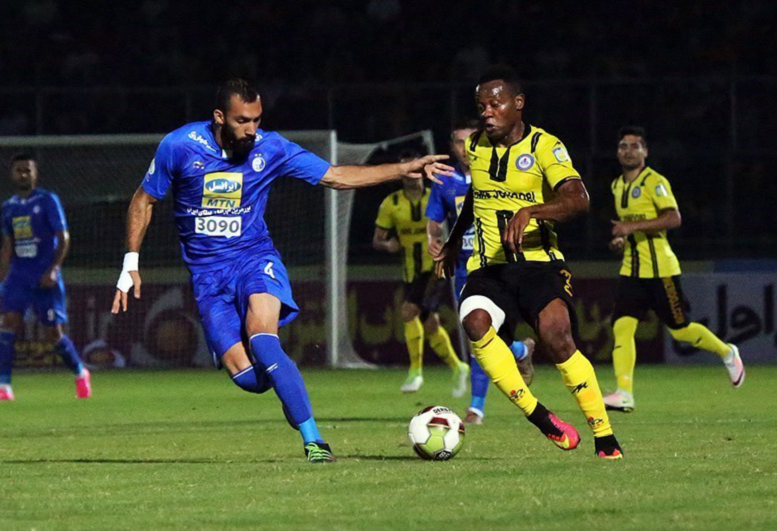
Cheshmi (left) playing against Pars Jonoubi Jam in 2017.

Cheshmi made his debut for Esteghlal on 30 July 2015 against Siah Jamegan. On 3 March 2015, he torn his Cruciate ligament in a match against Padideh which caused him to miss the rest of the season. It was also reported that he will miss the first half of 2016–17 season and the team coach Alireza Mansourian decided to exclude his name from Esteghlal's list for the first half of the season and was reported that he would return to the squad in January. On 29 June 2016, he signed a 3-year contract extension with Esteghlal. He returned to training on 30 December 2016. However, due to the club's transfer ban which did not allow it to register any new players, Esteghlal could not include his name in their squad for the rest of season and meant that he would not be able to play for Esteghlal until the end of the season.

Cheshmi scored his first goal for the club against Zob Ahan in a 1–1 draw on 20 September 2017. On 13 February 2018, Cheshmi made his AFC Champions League debut in a 2–2 group stage draw with Qatari club Al-Rayyan.

== International career ==
=== U17 ===
He played 3 games at the 2010 Asian U16 Championships.

=== U20 ===
He is part of Iran U–20 during 2012 AFC U-19 Championship qualification, 2012 CIS Cup, 2012 AFF U-19 Youth Championship and 2012 AFC U-19 Championship.

=== U23 ===
He invited to Iran U-23 training camp by Nelo Vingada to preparation for Incheon 2014 and 2016 AFC U-22 Championship (Summer Olympic qualification). He named in Iran U23 final list for Incheon 2014.

=== Senior ===
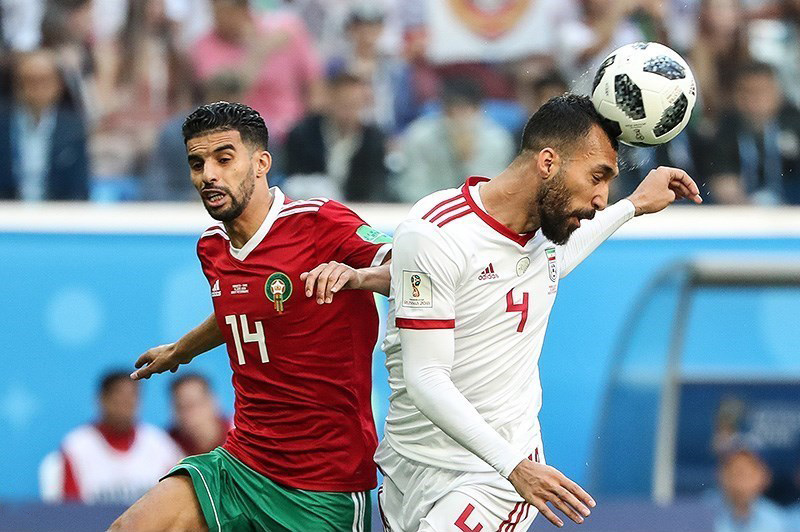
Cheshmi (right) playing for Iran, against Morocco in the 2018 FIFA World Cup.

Cheshmi was called up for the first time for the Iran senior team in August 2017 by coach Carlos Queiroz for Iran's 2018 FIFA World Cup qualifying matches against South Korea and Syria. He made his official debut as a substitute in 0–0 draw against South Korea on 31 August 2017.

In May 2018, Cheshmi was named in Iran's preliminary squad for the 2018 FIFA World Cup in Russia. He made his debut in the competition on 15 June, playing the whole 90 minutes of the 1–0 group stage win against Morocco, helping his team to win their first World Cup match since 1998. After helping Iran to keep a clean sheet in their opening win over Morocco, the World Cup turned out to be a personal disappointment for him, as he suffered an injury during training session prior the game against the Spain, which ruled him out of the competition.

Cheshmi was also selected for 2019 AFC Asian Cup. He was in the initial lineup during the match of the 2022 Qatar World Cup against England. He scored the winning goal in the match against Wales in injury time, before Ramin Rezaeian doubled the lead minutes later, thus giving Iran their first victory against a European team at the World Cup.

On 1 June 2026, he was named in the 26-man squad for the 2026 FIFA World Cup.

== Personal life ==
On 9 February 2026, in the midst of the 2025–2026 Iranian protests, Cheshmi publicly objected to being included on a list of supporters of the 1979 Islamic Revolution by the Ministry of Sport and Youth, ahead of the Revolution's anniversary.

== Career statistics ==
=== Club ===
As of 7 November 2026

Club	Division	Season	League		Hazfi Cup		Asia		other		Total	
Club	Division	Season	Apps	Goals	Apps	Goals	Apps	Goals	Apps	Goals	Apps	Goals
Saba	Persian Gulf Pro League	2013–14	25	1	1	0	0	0	—		26	1
Saba	Persian Gulf Pro League	2014–15	24	0	1	0	0	0	—		25	0
Saba	Total		49	1	2	0	0	0	—		51	1
Esteghlal	Persian Gulf Pro League	2015–16	22	0	4	0	0	0	—		26	0
Esteghlal	Persian Gulf Pro League	2016–17	0	0	0	0	0	0	0	0	0	0
Esteghlal	Persian Gulf Pro League	2017–18	26	3	5	0	9	0	0	0	40	3
Esteghlal	Persian Gulf Pro League	2018–19	19	0	2	0	4	1	0	0	25	1
Esteghlal	Persian Gulf Pro League	2019–20	22	1	3	0	6	0	0	0	31	1
Esteghlal	Persian Gulf Pro League	2021–22	19	0	3	0	0	0	0	0	22	0
Esteghlal	Persian Gulf Pro League	2022–23	27	2	5	0	0	0	1	0	33	2
Esteghlal	Persian Gulf Pro League	2023–24	28	2	1	0	0	0	0	0	29	2
Esteghlal	Persian Gulf Pro League	2024–25	20	0	5	1	8	0	0	0	33	1
Esteghlal	Persian Gulf Pro League	2025–26	15	1	1	0	3	1	1	1	20	3
Esteghlal	Persian Gulf Pro League	2026–27	10	0	0	0	4	0	0	0	14	0
Esteghlal	Total		208	9	29	1	34	2	2	1	273	13
Umm Salal	Qatar Stars League	2020–21	18	1	2	0	0	0	0	0	20	1
Career Total			275	11	33	1	34	2	2	1	344	15

=== International ===
As of 8 September 2025

National team	Year	Apps	Goals
Iran
Iran	2017	5	0
Iran	2018	10	1
Iran	2019	3	0
Iran	2022	4	1
Iran	2023	8	0
Iran	2024	6	1
Iran	2025	5	0
Total		41	3

Scores and results list Iran's goal tally first, score column indicates score after each Cheshmi goal.

List of international goals scored by Rouzbeh Cheshmi
No.	Date	Venue	Opponent	Score	Result	Competition
1	19 May 2018	Azadi Stadium, Tehran, Iran	Uzbekistan	1–0	1–0	Friendly
2	25 November 2022	Ahmad bin Ali Stadium, Al Rayyan, Qatar	Wales	1–0	2–0	2022 FIFA World Cup
3.	9 January 2024	Al Rayyan Training, Al Rayyan, Qatar	Indonesia	2–0	5–0	Friendly

== Honours ==
Esteghlal

- Persian Gulf Pro League: 2021–22
- Hazfi Cup: 2017–18, 2024–25
- Iranian Super Cup: 2022

Iran

- CAFA Nations Cup: 2023

Individual

- AFC Champions League All-Star Squad: 2018
