= Abbas Sharafi =

Iranian footballer

Personal information
- Date of birth: 29 January 2003 (age 23)
- Place of birth: Ramhormoz, Khuzestan, Iran
- Position: Midfielder

Team information
- Current team: Esteghlal Khuzestan
- Number: 16

Youth career
- 2014–2017: Foolad
- 2020–2021: Persepolis
- 2021–2022: Paykan

Senior career*
Years	Team	Apps	(Gls)
2022–2024	Gol Gohar	4	(0)
2024–2025	Esteghlal	0	(0)
2025–2026	Nirooye Zamini	40	(1)
2026–	Esteghlal Khuzestan	7	(0)

International career^{‡}
2022–2024	Iran U20	4	(0)
- * Club domestic league appearances and goals as of 29 April 2025 ‡ National team caps and goals as of 1 July 2023

Abbas Sharafi (Persian: عباس شرفی; born 29 January 2003) is an Iranian footballer who plays as a midfielder for Iranian club Esteghlal Khuzestan in the Persian Gulf Pro League.

== Club career ==
=== Early career ===
Sharafi started his career as a youth player at Foolad and then transferred to Persepolis. In 2022, he signed for Iranian side Paykan.

=== Gol Gohar ===
He joined Gol Gohar in September 2022. He made his debut on 27 February 2024 in the 18th match of the 2023–24 Persian Gulf Pro League season against Nassaji Mazandaran while he substituted in for Ahmad Reza Zendehrouh.

=== Esteghlal ===
On 10 August 2024, Sharafi signed a 3-year contract with Esteghlal club.

== Club career statistics ==
Last Update 1 July 2024

Appearances and goals by club, season and competition
Club	Season	League			cup		Continental		Total	
Club	Season	Division	Apps	Goals	Apps	Goals	Apps	Goals	Apps	Goals
Gol Gohar	2023–24	Pro League	4	0	0	0	—		4	0
Career total			4	0	0	0	0	0	4	0
