= Milad Zakipour =

Iranian footballer (born 1995)

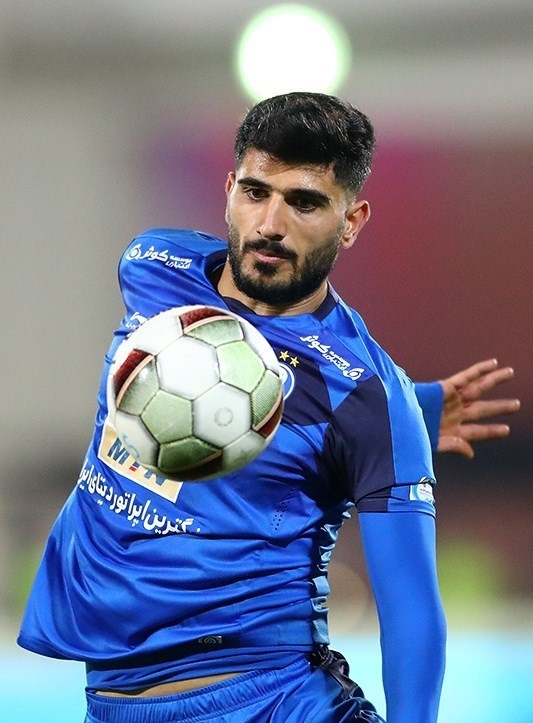
- Zakipour with Esteghlal in 2018

Personal information
- Full name: Milad Zakipour Kinji
- Date of birth: 28 April 1995 (age 31)
- Place of birth: Chalous, Iran
- Height: 1.82 m (5 ft 11 1/2 in)
- Positions: Left back; left winger

Team information
- Current team: Tractor
- Number: 4

Youth career
- Shamoushak Noshahr
- –2013: Parseh
- 2013–2015: Moghavemat Tehran
- 2015–2016: Naft Tehran

Senior career*
Years	Team	Apps	(Gls)
2015–2016	Naft Tehran	5	(0)
2016–2020	Esteghlal	73	(1)
2020–2022	Gol Gohar	52	(1)
2022–2024	Sepahan	52	(3)
2024–2025	Esteghlal	14	(0)
2025–2026	Sepahan	24	(0)
2026–	Tractor	3	(0)

International career^{‡}
2023	Iran	1	(0)
- * Club domestic league appearances and goals as of 15 May 2025 ‡ National team caps and goals as of 23 March 2023

Milad Zakipour (Persian: میلاد زکی‌پور, born 28 April 1995) is an Iranian football defender who plays for Tractor in the Persian Gulf Pro League.

== Club career ==
=== Naft Tehran ===
He was promoted to first team in December 2015. He made his debut for Naft Tehran on 28 December 2015 against Tractor Sazi as a substitute for Vahid Hamdinejad.

=== Esteghlal ===
He joins Esteghlal in June 2016 for a three-year contract.

=== Gol Gohar Sirjan ===
He joins Gol Gohar Sirjan on 3 November 2020 for one-year contract.

== Club career statistics ==
As of 15 May 2025

Club	Division	Season	League		Hazfi Cup		Asia		Total	
Club	Division	Season	Apps	Goals	Apps	Goals	Apps	Goals	Apps	Goals
Naft Tehran	Pro League	2015–16	5	0	0	0	0	0	5	0
Esteghlal	Pro League	2016–17	15	0	1	0	8	0	24	0
Esteghlal	Pro League	2017–18	20	0	2	0	3	0	25	0
Esteghlal	Pro League	2018–19	21	1	2	0	4	0	27	1
Esteghlal	Pro League	2019–20	17	0	5	0	5	0	27	0
Esteghlal	Total		73	1	10	0	20	0	103	1
Gol Gohar	Pro League	2020–21	29	0	3	0	_		32	0
Gol Gohar	Pro League	2021–22	23	1	2	0	_		25	1
Gol Gohar	Total		52	1	5	0	0	0	57	1
Sepahan	Pro League	2022–23	25	3	2	0	0	0	27	3
Sepahan	Pro League	2023–24	27	0	3	0	7	0	37	0
Sepahan	Total		52	3	5	0	7	0	64	3
Esteghlal	Pro League	2024–25	14	0	1	0	6	0	21	0
Sepahan	Pro League	2024–25	12	0	1	1	0	0	13	1
Career totals			208	5	22	1	33	0	263	6

== International career ==
He made his senior debut against Russia on 23 March 2023 in a friendly match.

== Honours ==
Esteghlal

- Hazfi Cup: 2017–18

Sepahan

- Hazfi Cup: 2023–24
