= Armin Sohrabian =

Iranian footballer

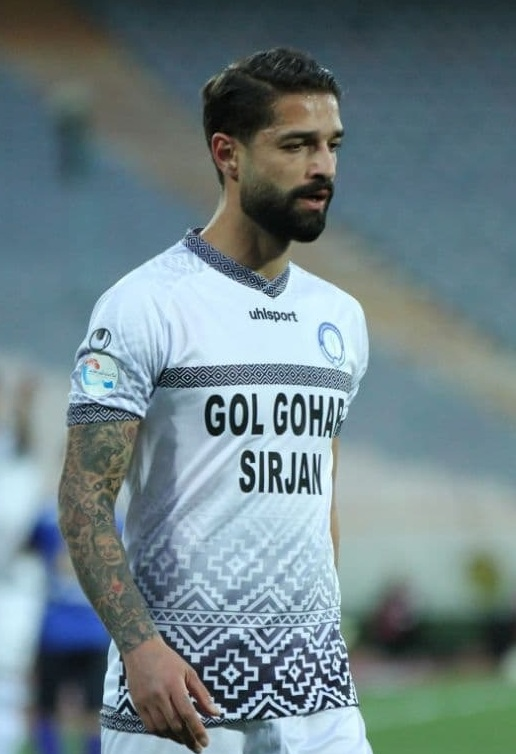
- Sohrabian with Gol Gohar in 2022

Personal information
- Date of birth: 26 July 1995 (age 31)
- Place of birth: Gorgan, Iran
- Height: 1.85 m (6 ft 1 in)
- Position: Defender

Team information
- Current team: Sepahan
- Number: 44

Youth career
- 2011–2014: Sepahan

Senior career*
| Years | Team | Apps | (Gls) |
| 2014–2017 | Sepahan | 14 | (0) |
| 2017–2019 | Esteghlal | 26 | (0) |
| 2019–2020 | Saipa | 29 | (3) |
| 2020–2023 | Gol Gohar | 74 | (6) |
| 2023–2024 | Esteghlal | 17 | (4) |
| 2024–2025 | Nassaji | 8 | (0) |
| 2025–2026 | Esteghlal | 16 | (0) |
| 2026– | Sepahan | 5 | (0) |

International career^{‡}
| 2012–2014 | Iran U20 | 13 | (1) |
| 2023 | Iran | 1 | (0) |
- * Club domestic league appearances and goals as of 18 January 2026 ‡ National team caps and goals as of 28 March 2023

Armin Sohrabian (Persian: آرمین سهرابیان; born 26 July 1995) is an Iranian footballer who plays as a defender for Sepahan.

== Club career ==
=== Sepahan ===
Armin Sohrabian is a product of Sepahan Club Academy. He started playing football for the Sepahan youth team in 2011 and in 2014 he joined the senior team. He won the 2014-2014 Premier League with Sepahan.

=== Esteghlal ===
He joined Esteghlal Tehran on Wednesday, 28 July 2017 with a two-year contract. After a few weeks on the bench, he played his first game for Esteghlal against South Pars Jam in his specialized position of left defender in the 2017–2017 season.

In the match between Esteghlal and Foolad Khuzestan, in a clash between him and Padovani, the defender of Esteghlal, he was injured. Sohrabian was placed in the middle of the defense in the same match. The title of central defender went to the field

Armin Sohrabian won the Iranian Football Cup 97–96 in his first year in Esteghlal

The peak of Sohrabian's brilliance was in the match between Esteghlal and Zobahan in the Asian Champions League. A clash took place between him and the defender of Zobahan team in the penalty area. This player was influential in the rise of Esteghlal.

He left the team at the end of the 2018–2019 season and after two seasons in Esteghlal and playing 38 games.

== Career statistics ==
=== Club ===
As of 18 January 2026

Appearances and goals by club, season and competition
| Club | Season | League | | | Hazfi Cup | | Asia | | Other | | Total | |
| Club | Season | League | Apps | Goals | Apps | Goals | Apps | Goals | Apps | Goals | Apps | Goals |
|---|---|---|---|---|---|---|---|---|---|---|---|---|
| Sepahan | 2016–17 | Iran Pro League | 14 | 0 | 2 | 0 | — | | — | | 16 | 0 |
| Esteghlal | 2017–18 | Iran Pro League | 8 | 0 | 1 | 0 | 6 | 0 | 0 | 0 | 15 | 0 |
| Esteghlal | 2018–19 | Iran Pro League | 18 | 0 | 2 | 0 | 3 | 0 | 0 | 0 | 23 | 0 |
| Esteghlal | 2023–24 | Iran Pro League | 17 | 4 | 1 | 0 | 0 | 0 | 0 | 0 | 18 | 4 |
| Esteghlal | 2024–25 | Iran Pro League | 11 | 0 | 3 | 0 | 4 | 0 | 0 | 0 | 18 | 0 |
| Esteghlal | 2025–26 | Iran Pro League | 5 | 0 | 1 | 0 | 1 | 0 | 1 | 0 | 8 | 0 |
| Esteghlal | Total | | 59 | 4 | 8 | 0 | 14 | 0 | 1 | 0 | 82 | 4 |
| Saipa | 2019–20 | Persian Gulf Pro League | 29 | 3 | 1 | 0 | — | | — | | 30 | 3 |
| Gol Gohar | 2020–21 | Persian Gulf Pro League | 27 | 0 | 4 | 0 | — | | — | | 31 | 0 |
| Gol Gohar | 2021–22 | Persian Gulf Pro League | 23 | 2 | 2 | 0 | — | | — | | 25 | 2 |
| Gol Gohar | 2022–23 | Persian Gulf Pro League | 24 | 4 | 3 | 0 | — | | — | | 27 | 4 |
| Gol Gohar | Total | | 103 | 6 | 9 | 0 | — | — | — | — | 112 | 6 |
| Nassaji Mazandaran | 2024–25 | Persian Gulf Pro League | 8 | 0 | 0 | 0 | — | | — | | 8 | 0 |
| Career total | | | 184 | 13 | 20 | 0 | 14 | 0 | 1 | 0 | 219 | 13 |

== Honours ==
Sepahan

- Persian Gulf Pro League (1) : 2014–15

Esteghlal

- Hazfi Cup (2) : 2017–18, 2024–25
