= Mojtaba Hasheminasab =

Iranian footballer (born 2005)

- Mojtaba Hasheminasab in 2024

Personal information
- Date of birth: 20 October 2005 (age 21)
- Place of birth: Behbahan, Iran
- Height: 1.75 m (5 ft 9 in)
- Position: Winger

Team information
- Current team: Mes Shahr-e Babak (on loan from Esteghlal)
- Number: 88

Youth career
- 2019–2022: Esteghlal
- 2022–2023: Persepolis
- 2023–: Esteghlal

Senior career*
Years	Team	Apps	(Gls)
2024–	Esteghlal	1	(0)
2025–2026	→ Nirooye Zamini (loan)	25	(1)
2026–	→ Mes Shahr-e Babak (loan)	8	(0)
- * Club domestic league appearances and goals as of 9 November 2024

Mojtaba Hasheminasab (Persian: مجتبی هاشمی‌نسب; born 20 October 2005) is an Iranian professional footballer who plays as a winger for Iranian club Mes Shahr-e Babak in the Persian Gulf Pro League.

== Career ==
=== Early career ===
Hasheminasab started his career as a youth player at Esteghlal and then transferred to Persepolis. After one season, he came back to Esteghlal again.

=== Esteghlal ===
On 6 November 2024, Hasheminasab was called up to the First team by Pitso Mosimane. He made his debut on 9 November 2024 in the 4th match of the 2024–25 Persian Gulf Pro League season against Mes Rafsanjan while he substituted in for Gaël Kakuta.

== Career statistics ==
Last Update 9 November 2024

Appearances and goals by club, season and competition
Club	Season	League			Cup		Continental		Total	
Club	Season	Division	Apps	Goals	Apps	Goals	Apps	Goals	Apps	Goals
Esteghlal	2024–25	Pro League	1	0	0	0	0	0	1	0
Career total			1	0	0	0	0	0	1	0
