= Abolfazl Zamani =

Iranian footballer (born 2006)

Personal information
- Full name: Abolfazl Zamani Ahmadabad
- Date of birth: 1 March 2006 (age 20)
- Place of birth: Tehran, Iran
- Height: 1.83 m (6 ft 0 in)
- Position: Midfielder

Team information
- Current team: Esteghlal
- Number: 15

Youth career
- 2020–2021: Saipa
- 2021–2023: Paykan

Senior career*
Years	Team	Apps	(Gls)
2023–2024	Paykan	6	(1)
2024–	Esteghlal	21	(1)

International career^{‡}
2023–	Iran U17	9	(0)
2024–	Iran U20	12	(2)
- * Club domestic league appearances and goals as of 23 October 2026 ‡ National team caps and goals as of 23 February 2025

Abolfazl Zamani (Persian: ابوالفضل زمانی, born 1 March 2006) is an Iranian footballer who plays as a midfielder for Iranian club Esteghlal in the Persian Gulf Pro League.

== Club career ==
=== Early career ===
Zamani started his career as a youth player at Saipa and then transferred to Paykan.

=== Paykan ===
He made his debut on 27 February 2024 in the 18th match of the 2023–24 Persian Gulf Pro League season against Mes Rafsanjan while he substituted in for Mojtaba Haghdoost.

=== Esteghlal ===
On 19 September 2024, Sharafi signed a 3-year contract with Esteghlal.

== Club career statistics ==
As of 23 October 2026

Appearances and goals by club, season and competition
Club	Season	League			Cup		Continental		Total	
Club	Season	Division	Apps	Goals	Apps	Goals	Apps	Goals	Apps	Goals
Paykan	2023–24	Pro League	6	1	1	1	—		7	2
Esteghlal	2024–25	Pro League	10	1	3	0	3	0	16	1
Esteghlal	2025–26	Pro League	7	0	2	0	6	0	15	0
Esteghlal	2026–27	Pro League	4	0	0	0	0	0	4	0
Esteghlal	Total		21	1	5	0	9	0	35	1
Career total			27	2	6	1	9	0	42	3

== Honours ==
Esteghlal

- Iranian Hazfi Cup: 2024–25
