= Ahmad Reza Zendehrouh =

Iranian footballer

Ahmad Reza Zendeh Rouh
Personal information
- Full name: Ahmad Reza Zendeh Rouh
- Date of birth: July 9, 1992 (age 34)
- Place of birth: Kerman, Iran
- Height: 1.81 m (5 ft 11 in)
- Position: Midfielder

Team information
- Current team: Gol Gohar
- Number: 60

Youth career
- –2009: Mes Kerman

Senior career*
| Years | Team | Apps | (Gls) |
| 2009–2017 | Mes Kerman | 127 | (10) |
| 2017–2018 | Gostaresh Foulad | 28 | (0) |
| 2018–2020 | Machine Sazi | 40 | (8) |
| 2020–2025 | Gol Gohar | 80 | (10) |
| 2021–2022 | → Fajr Sepasi (loan) | 45 | (5) |
| 2025 | Shams Azar | 13 | (0) |
| 2025–2026 | Mes Rafsanjan | 21 | (0) |
| 2026– | Gol Gohar | 10 | (0) |

International career^{‡}
| 2012–2014 | Iran U22 | 7 | (0) |
- * Club domestic league appearances and goals as of 16 August 2021 ‡ National team caps and goals as of 16 August 2021

Ahmad Reza Zendeh Rouh (Persian: احمدرضا زنده روح; born July 9, 1992) is an Iranian football winger who plays for Gol Gohar in the Persian Gulf Pro League.

== Career ==
Zendeh Rouh has played his entire career with Mes Kerman.

== Club career statistics ==
- Last Update: 6 August 2018

| Club performance | | | League | | Cup | | Continental | | Total | |
| Season | Club | League | Apps | Goals | Apps | Goals | Apps | Goals | Apps | Goals |
| Iran | | | League | | Hazfi Cup | | Asia | | Total | |
|---|---|---|---|---|---|---|---|---|---|---|
| 2009–10 | Mes Kerman | Pro League | 0 | 0 | 0 | 0 | – | | 0 | 0 |
| 2010–11 | Mes Kerman | Pro League | 0 | 0 | 0 | 0 | – | | 0 | 0 |
| 2011–12 | Mes Kerman | Pro League | 14 | 0 | 0 | 0 | – | | 14 | 0 |
| 2012–13 | Mes Kerman | Pro League | 16 | 0 | 0 | 0 | – | | 16 | 0 |
| 2013–14 | Mes Kerman | Pro League | 17 | 0 | 0 | 0 | – | | 17 | 0 |
| 2014–15 | Mes Kerman | Azadegan League | 25 | 6 | 0 | 0 | – | | 25 | 6 |
| 2015–16 | Mes Kerman | Azadegan League | 33 | 3 | 0 | 0 | – | | 33 | 3 |
| 2016–17 | Mes Kerman | Azadegan League | 27 | 5 | 1 | 0 | – | | 28 | 5 |
| Total | | | 132 | 14 | 1 | 0 | 0 | 0 | 133 | 14 |
| 2017–18 | Gostaresh Foolad | Pro League | 28 | 0 | 3 | 0 | – | | 31 | 0 |
| 2018-19 | Machine Sazi | Persian Gulf Pro League | 24 | 1 | 3 | 0 | - | - | 27 | 1 |
| 2019-20 | Machine Sazi | Persian Gulf Pro League | 16 | 7 | 1 | 0 | - | - | 17 | 7 |
| Total | | | 40 | 8 | 4 | 0 | 0 | 0 | 44 | 8 |
| 2019-20 | Gol Gohar | Persian Gulf Pro League | 14 | 1 | 0 | 0 | - | - | 14 | 1 |
| 2020-21 | Gol Gohar | Persian Gulf Pro League | 29 | 2 | 4 | 1 | - | - | 33 | 3 |
| Total | | | 43 | 3 | 4 | 1 | 0 | 0 | 47 | 4 |
| 2021-22 | Fajr Sepasi F.C. | Persian Gulf Pro League | 30 | 0 | 0 | 0 | - | - | 30 | 0 |
| 2022-23 | Fajr Sepasi F.C. | Azadegan League | 15 | 5 | 0 | 0 | - | - | 15 | 0 |
| Total | | | 45 | 5 | 0 | 0 | 0 | 0 | 45 | 5 |
| 2023-24 | Gol Gohar | Persian Gulf Pro League | 28 | 7 | 3 | 2 | - | - | 31 | 9 |
| Career total | | | 316 | 37 | 15 | 3 | 0 | 0 | 331 | 40 |

== International career ==
=== U 22 ===
He was called up by Ali Reza Mansourian to participate in the team's training camp in Italy.
