= Alireza Koushki =

Iranian footballer

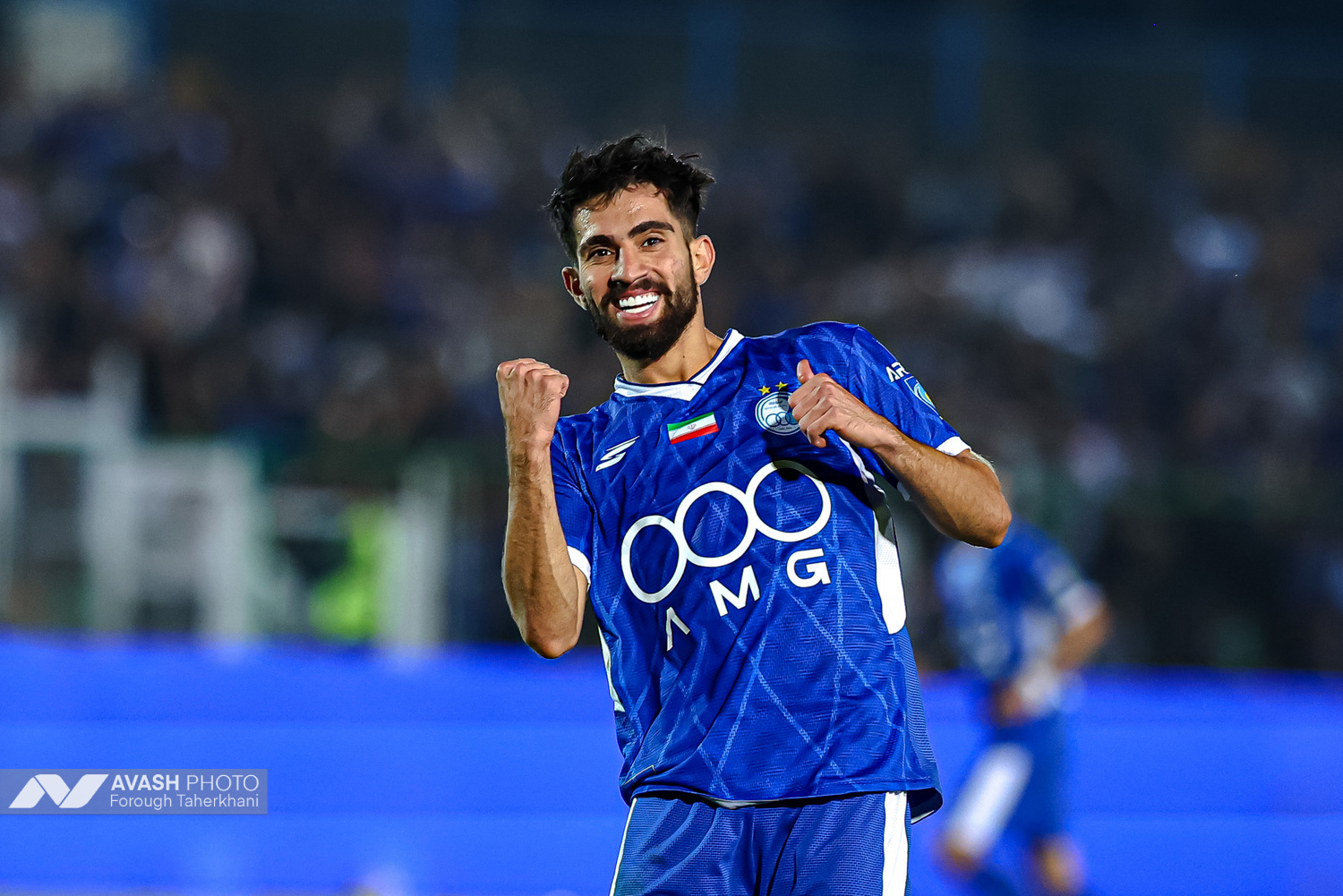
- Koushki with Esteghlal in 2025

Personal information
- Date of birth: 16 February 2000 (age 26)
- Place of birth: Gachsaran, Iran
- Height: 1.73 m (5 ft 8 in)
- Position: Winger

Team information
- Current team: Esteghlal
- Number: 20

Youth career
- Naft Gachsaran
- 2016–2017: Sepahan

Senior career*
Years	Team	Apps	(Gls)
2017–2018	Sepidrood	2	(0)
2018–2022	Paykan	48	(7)
2022–2023	Foolad	35	(2)
2023–2024	Gol Gohar	23	(3)
2024–	Esteghlal	55	(5)

International career^{‡}
2025	Iran	2	(0)
Medal record
Representing Iran
CAFA Nations Cup
Runner-up	2025 Tajikistan–Uzbekistan	Team
- * Club domestic league appearances and goals as of 23 October 2026 ‡ National team caps and goals as of 18 November 2025

Ali Reza Kooshki (Persian: علی رضا کوشکی; born 16 February 2000) is an Iranian footballer who plays as a Winger for Persian Gulf Pro League side Esteghlal.

== Career statistics ==
=== Club ===
As of 27 October 2026.

Club	Season	League			Cup		Continental		Other		Total	
Club	Season	Division	Apps	Goals	Apps	Goals	Apps	Goals	Apps	Goals	Apps	Goals
Sepidrood Rasht	2017–18	Persian Gulf Pro League	2	0	0	0	–		0	0	2	0
Paykan	2018–19	Persian Gulf Pro League	1	0	0	0	–		0	0	1	0
Paykan	2019–20	Persian Gulf Pro League	14	2	1	1	–		0	0	15	3
Paykan	2020–21	Persian Gulf Pro League	18	1	0	0	0	0	0	0	18	1
Paykan	2021–22	Persian Gulf Pro League	15	4	0	0	0	0	0	0	15	4
Paykan	Total		48	7	1	0	0	0	0	0	49	7
Foolad	2021–22	Persian Gulf Pro League	10	1	0	0	6	0	1	0	17	1
Foolad	2022–23	Persian Gulf Pro League	25	1	2	0	0	0	0	0	27	1
Foolad	Total		35	2	2	0	6	0	1	0	44	2
Gol Gohar	2023–24	Persian Gulf Pro League	23	1	4	0	0	0	0	0	27	1
Esteghlal	2024–25	Persian Gulf Pro League	23	2	3	1	7	1	0	0	33	4
Esteghlal	2025–26	Persian Gulf Pro League	22	3	2	0	5	0	1	0	30	3
Esteghlal	2026–27	Persian Gulf Pro League	10	0	0	0	3	0	0	0	13	0
Esteghlal	Total		55	5	5	1	15	1	1	0	76	7
Career total			163	15	12	2	21	1	2	0	198	18

== International career ==
He made his debut against Afghanistan on 29 August 2025 in CAFA Championship.

=== International ===
As of match played 18 November 2025

Appearances and goals by national team and year
National team	Year	Apps	Goals
Iran
Iran	2025	2	0
Total		2	0

== Honours ==
Foolad

- Iranian Super Cup: 2021

Esteghlal

- Iranian Hazfi Cup: 2024–25
