= Saman Fallah =

Iranian footballer (born 2001)

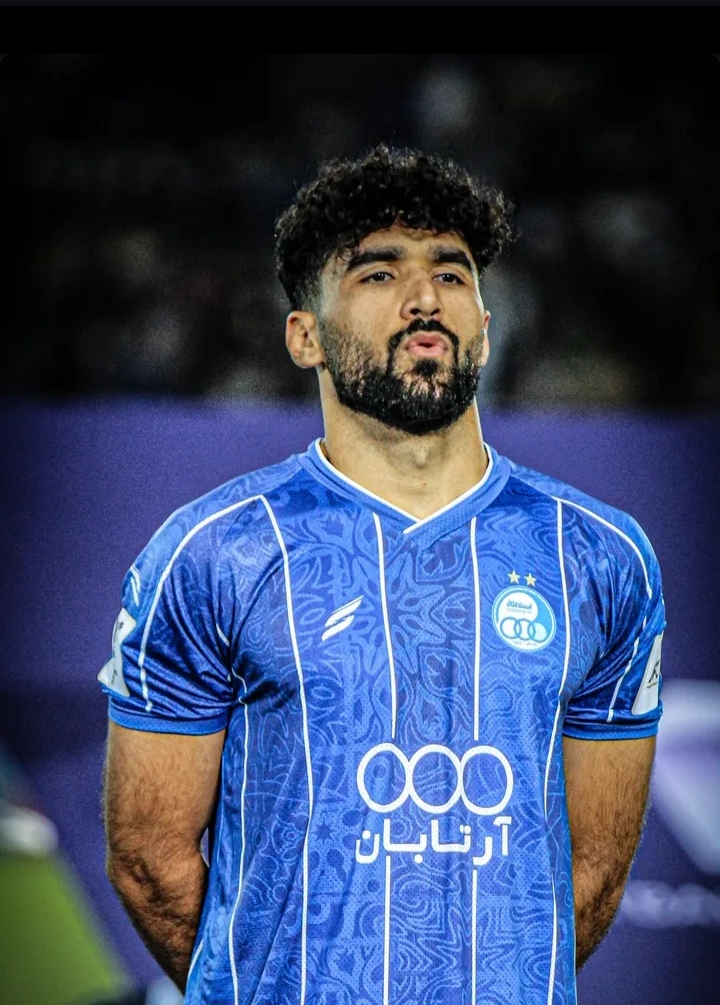
- Fallah with Esteghlal in 2025

Personal information
- Full name: Saman Fallah Varnami
- Date of birth: 12 May 2001 (age 25)
- Place of birth: Sari, Iran
- Height: 1.84 m (6 ft 0 in)
- Position: Centre-back

Team information
- Current team: Esteghlal
- Number: 6

Youth career
- –2018: Padideh Sari
- 2018–2020: Moghavemat
- 2020: Paykan

Senior career*
Years	Team	Apps	(Gls)
2020–2023	Paykan	57	(3)
2023–2024	Gol Gohar	22	(0)
2024–	Esteghlal	37	(1)
2025	→ Malavan (loan)	12	(0)

International career^{‡}
2021–2024	Iran U23	16	(0)
2023–	Iran	8	(0)
- * Club domestic league appearances and goals as of 7 November 2026 ‡ National team caps and goals as of 17 November 2026

Saman Fallah (Persian: سامان فلاح; born 12 May 2001) is an Iranian footballer who plays as a defender for Esteghlal in the Persian Gulf Pro League and the Iran national team.

== Personal life ==
On 27 January 2026, Fallah, in solidarity with the 2025–2026 Iranian protests, refused to celebrate a goal he scored in a match against Esteghlal Khuzestan F.C.. He had previously refused to celebrate a goal he scored against Foolad Hormozgan.

== Career statistics ==
=== Club ===
As of 7 November 2026

Club	Season	League			National Cup		Continental		Other		Total	
Club	Season	League	Apps	Goals	Apps	Goals	Apps	Goals	Apps	Goals	Apps	Goals
Paykan	2020–21	Persian Gulf Pro League	17	2	1	0	-	-	-	-	18	2
Paykan	2021–22	Persian Gulf Pro League	18	0	1	0	-	-	-	-	19	0
Paykan	2022–23	Persian Gulf Pro League	22	1	2	0	-	-	-	-	24	1
Paykan	Total		57	3	4	0	-	-	-	-	61	3
Gol Gohar	2023–24	Persian Gulf Pro League	22	0	3	0	-	-	-	-	25	0
Gol Gohar	Total		22	0	3	0	-	-	-	-	25	0
Esteghlal	2024–25	Persian Gulf Pro League	9	0	0	0	5	0	-	-	14	0
Esteghlal	2025–26	Persian Gulf Pro League	17	1	2	1	7	0	1	0	27	2
Esteghlal	2026–27	Persian Gulf Pro League	11	0	0	0	4	0	0	0	15	0
Esteghlal	Total		37	1	2	1	16	0	1	0	56	2
Malavan	2024–25	Persian Gulf Pro League	12	0	4	0	-	-	-	-	16	0
Malavan	Total		12	0	4	0	-	-	-	-	16	0
Career Total			128	4	13	1	16	0	1	0	158	5

== International career ==
He made his debut against Burkina Faso on 5 January 2024.

=== International ===
As of match played 17 November 2026

Appearances and goals by national team and year
National team	Year	Apps	Goals
Iran
Iran	2024	4	0
Iran	2026	4	0
Total		8	0
