= 2024–25 Hazfi Cup =

Iranian Football tournament season

Iranian Knockout Cup
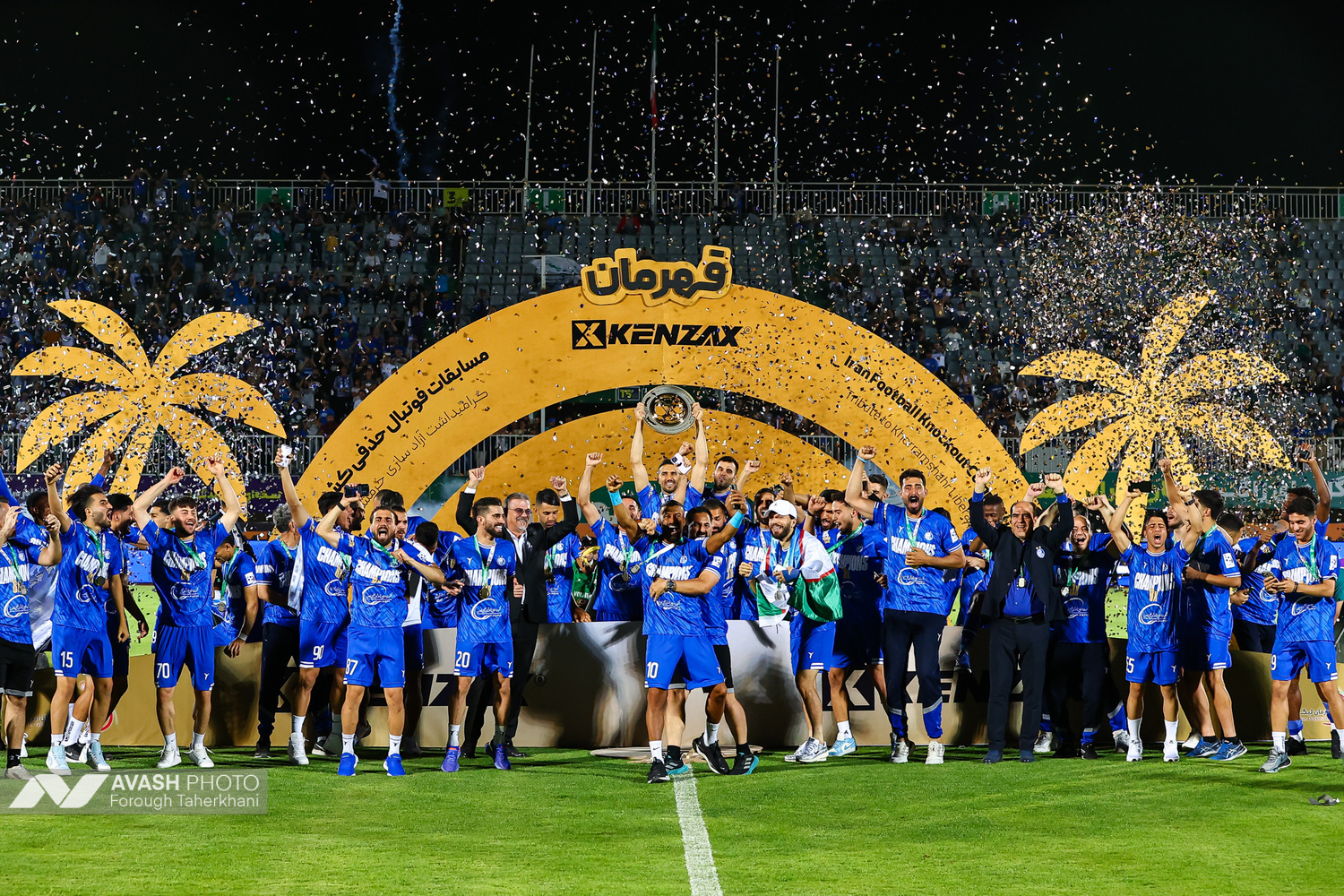
- Esteghal lifting the cup

Tournament details
- Country: Iran
- Dates: 29 September 2024 – 29 May 2025
- Teams: 78

Final positions
- Champions: Esteghlal (8th title)
- Runners-up: Malavan
- Champions League Two: Esteghlal
- All statistics correct as of 22 November 2024.

The 2024–25 Hazfi Cup was the 38th season of the Iranian football knockout competition. The champions of this competition qualified for the Super Cup and the AFC Champions League Two group stage in the following season.

Sepahan were the defending champions, but were knocked out on penalties by Malavan in the quarter-finals.

Esteghlal won this tournament in May 2025 after defeating Malavan in the final.

== Qualified teams ==
A total of 78 teams (out of a possible total of 96 eligible teams) participated. The teams were divided into four main groups.

- 16 teams of the Persian Gulf Pro League: entered at the Round of 32.
- 18 teams of the Azadegan League: entered at the third round.
- 28 teams from the 2nd Division: entered at the second round.
- 16 teams (out of a possible total of 34 teams) (Note: Kish, Khoramshahr and Tehran have extra representatives) from Provincial Leagues entered in the first round.

== Schedule ==
The schedule of the competition was as follows

Stage	Round	Draw date	Matches dates
First stage	Round 1	18 September 2024	29–30 September 2023
First stage	Round 2	18 September 2024	5–6 December 2023
First stage	Round 3	13 October 2024	14 October 2024
Second Stage	Round of 32	6 November 2024	21–24 November 2024
Second Stage	Round of 16	23 December 2024	12–14 February 2025
Second Stage	Quarter-finals	23 February 2025	25–26 April 2025
Second Stage	Semi-finals	23 February 2025	23–24 May 2025
Second Stage	Final	23 February 2025	29 May 2025

== First stage ==
=== First round ===
Number of teams per tier still in competition
Pro League	Azadegan League	League 2	Provincial Leagues	Total
16 / 16	18 / 18	28 / 28	16 / 34	78 / 96

29 September 2024 1	Talayepooshan Arak (4)	w/o	Palayesh Naft Isfahan (4)	Mohajeran
14:00				Stadium: Petroshimi
Note: Palayesh Naft Isfahan withdrew.

30 September 2024 1	Poshtivan Paveh (4)	2–1	Mashin Sazi Saeen-Ghal'e (4)	Paveh
14:30				Stadium: Shohada Nooryab

29 September 2024 1	Emad Sazeh Birjand (4)	4–3	Shomal Zabol (4)	Birjand
14:00				Stadium: Azadi

30 September 2024 1	Etehad Sefin Kish (4)	0–0 (a.e.t.) (4–3 p)	Iranjavan Khoormooj (4)	Kish
18:00				Stadium: Olympic 1

30 September 2024 1	Nakhl Bam (4)	2–1	Omid Neyshaboor (4)	Bam
14:30				Stadium: Fajr

Notes

- Bye to the third round: Norouz Bookan, Parseh Sari, Yaran Ebrahim Hadi, Oghab Bozorg Ilam, Abipooshan Hamidieh and Padna Meymand Fars.

=== Second round ===
Number of teams per tier still in competition
Pro League	Azadegan League	League 2	Provincial Leagues	Total
16 / 16	18 / 18	17 / 28	11 / 34	62 / 96

7 October 2024 2	Khooshe Tala Sana Mashhad (3)	1–2	Foolad Hormozgan (3)	Mashhad
15:00				Stadium: Samen al-Aeme

7 October 2025 2	Norouz Bukan (4)	1–5	Shahin Tehran (3)	Bukan
15:00				Stadium: Khatam al-Anbiya

8 October 2025 2	Setaregan Abipoosh Zeydoon (3)	1–1 (a.e.t.) (4–1 p)	Navad Urmia (3)	Abadan
18:15				Stadium: Takhti

8 October 2025 2	PAS Hamedan (3)	4–0	Parseh Sari (4)	Hamedan
15:00				Stadium: Ghods

9 October 2025 2	Sorkhpooshan Atlas Talayi Shazand (3)	1–1 (a.e.t.) (2–4 p)	Yaran Ebrahim Hadi (4)

8 October 2025 2	Oghab Tehran (3)	10–0	Oghab Bozorg Ilam (4)	Tehran
14:30				Stadium: Marghoobkar

7 October 2025 2	Kesht o Sanat Padyab (3)	0–1	YASA Tehran (3)	Ardebil
14:30				Stadium: Takhti

7 October 2025 2	Fard Alborz (3)	2–0	Nika Pars Chaloos (3)	Karaj
16:00				Stadium: Enghelab

7 October 2025 2	KIA Tehran (3)	1–1 (a.e.t.) (4–5 p)	Shahid Ghandi Yazd (3)	Tehran
14:30				Stadium: Marghoobkar

9 October 2025 2	Shahin Bandar Ameri (3)	7–0	Emad Sazeh Birjand (4)	Bushehr
18:15				Stadium: Beheshti

9 October 2025 2	Abipooshan Hamidieh Khouzestan (4)	3–2	Ettehad Sefin Kish (4)	Ahvaz
18:15				Stadium: Ghadir

9 October 2025 2	Padna Meymand Fars (4)	5–1	Talayipooshan Arak (4)	Meymand
16:00				Stadium: Shahid Sayyadnejad

7 October 2025 2	Shahrdari Bandar Abbas (3)	5–1	Poshtivan Paveh (4)	Bandar Abbas
18:00				Stadium: Khalij Fars

21 October 2025 2	Shenavarsazi Qeshm (3)	5–0	Nakhl Bam (4)
16:30

=== Third round ===
Number of teams per tier still in competition
Pro League	Azadegan League	League 2	Provincial Leagues	Total
16 / 16	18 / 18	11 / 28	3 / 34	48 / 96

4 November 2024 3	Palayesh Naft Bandar Abbas (2)	2–1	Nirooye Zamini Tehran (2)	Bandar Abbas
17:30				Stadium: Khalij Fars

4 November 2024 3	Shahid Ghandi Yazd (3)	0–1	Sanat Naft Abadan (2)	Yazd
17:30				Stadium: Nasiri

4 October 2024 3	Paykan Tehran (2)	4–1	Setaregan Abipoosh Zeydoon (3)	Enghleba
16:30				Attendance: Karaj

4 November 2024 3	Naft va Gaz Gachsaran (2)	1–2	Shahrdari Noshahr (2)
17:30

3 November 2024 3	Mes Sungun (2)	5–1	Padna Meymand Fars (4)	Tabriz
15:30				Stadium: Yadegar Imam

4 November 2024 3	YASA Tehran (3)	1–0	Naft Masjed Soleyman (2)	Tehran
14:00				Stadium: Marghoobkar

November 2024 3	Yaran Ebrahim Hadi (4)	0–1	Shenavarsazi Qeshm (3)

4 November 2024 3	Saipa Tehran (2)	0–0 (a.e.t.) (3–4 p)	Fard Alborz (3)	Tehran
16:30				Stadium: Pas Ghavamin

3 November 2024 3	Shahin Tehran (3)	3–0	Shahin Bandar Ameri (3)
14:00
Note: Shahin Bandar Ameri withdrew.

5 November 2024 3	Foolad Hormozgan (3)	1–0	Oghab Tehran (3)	Bandar Abbas
17:30				Stadium: Khalij Fars

5 November 2024 3	Fajr Sepasi Shiraz (2)	0–0 (a.e.t.) (4–5 p)	Shahrdari Bandar Abbas (3)	Shiraz
16:30				Stadium: Hafezieh Stadium

3 November 2024 3	Shahrdari Astara (2)	2–0	Abipooshan Hamidieh Khouzestan (4)	Astara
15:30				Stadium: Vahdat

4 November 2024 3	Mes Shahre Babak (2)	2–1	Ario Eslamshahr (2)	Shahre Babak
16:15				Stadium: Shahid Soleymani

4 November 2024 3	Mes Kerman (2)	3–0	PAS Hamedan (3)	Kerman
16:15				Stadium: Shahid Raeisi
Note: Pas Hamedan withdrew.

4 November 2024 3	Shahre Raz Shiraz (2)	1–2	Besat Kermanshah (2)	Shiraz
16:30				Stadium: Hafezieh Stadium

4 November 2024 3	Damashian Rasht (2)	1–1 (a.e.t.) (4–5 p)	Pars Jonoobi Jam (2)
15:30

== Second stage ==
=== Bracket ===
Round of 32
Shams Azar	2
Shahin Tehran	1
Esteghlal	1
Mes Kerman	0
Esteghlal Khuzestan	0
Paykan	1
Foolad (p)	1 (4)
Foolad Hormozgan	1 (3)
Sanat Naft	1
Aluminium	0
Be'sat Kermanshah	1
Shahrdari Bandar Abbas	0
Shahrdari Noshahr	3
Shahrdari Astara	0
Palayesh Naft Bandar Abbas	2
YASA	0
Shenavarsazi Qeshm	0
Mes Rafsanjan	1
Nassaji	1
Mes Shahre Babak	0
Tractor	1
Gol Gohar	2
Fard Alborz	0
Kheybar	1
Chadormalou	2 (3)
Malavan (p)	2 (4)
Zob Ahan	1
Havadar	0
Pars Jonoubi Jam	0
Sepahan	2
Persepolis	3
Mes Sungun	0

Round of 16
Shams Azar	1
Esteghlal (a.e.t.)	2
Paykan (a.e.t.)	3
Foolad	2
Sanat Naft	2
Be'sat Kermanshah	0
Shahrdari Noshahr (a.e.t.)	1
Palayesh Naft Bandar Abbas	0
Mes Rafsanjan	0
Nassaji	1
Gol Gohar (p)	0 (4)
Kheybar	0 (2)
Malavan (a.e.t.)	1
Zob Ahan	0
Sepahan (a.e.t.)	3
Persepolis	2

Quarter-finals
Esteghlal	1
Paykan	0
Sanat Naft	1
Shahrdari Noshahr	0
Nassaji	1
Gol Gohar	3
Malavan (p)	0 (4)
Sepahan	0 (2)

Semi-Finals
Esteghlal	2
Sanat Naft	0
Gol Gohar	0
Malavan	1

Final
Esteghlal (a.e.t.)	1
Malavan	0

=== Round of 32 ===
Number of teams per tier still in competition
Pro League	Azadegan League	League 2	Provincial Leagues	Total
16 / 16	10 / 18	6 / 28	0 / 34	32 / 96

24 November 2024 4	Zob Ahan (1)	1–0	Havadar (1)
16:15

23 November 2024 4	Shams Azar (1)	2–1	Shahin Tehran (3)	Qazvin
16:15				Stadium: Sardar Azadegan

23 November 2024 4	Esteghlal Khuzestan (1)	0–1	Paykan (2)	Ahvaz
16:15				Stadium: Ghadir

22 November 2024 4	Tractor (1)	1–2	Gol Gohar (1)	Tabriz
15:00				Stadium: Yadegar-e Emam Stadium

22 November 2024 4	Pars Jonoubi Jam (2)	0–2	Sepahan (1)	Jam
17:45				Stadium: Takhti

21 November 2024 4	Persepolis (1)	3–0	Mes Sungun (2)
18:00

24 November 2024 4	Foolad (1)	1–1 (a.e.t.) (4–3 p)	Foolad Hormozgan (3)	Ahvaz
17:45				Stadium: Shohadaye Foolad

24 November 2024 4	Nassaji (1)	1–0	Mes Shahre Babak (2)	Qaem Shahr
16:15				Stadium: Shahid Vatani

22 November 2024 4	Shenavarsazi Qeshm (3)	0–1	Mes Rafsanjan (1)	Bandar Abbas
17:30				Stadium: Khalij Fars

22 November 2024 4	Fard Alborz (3)	0–1	Kheybar (1)	Karaj
16:15				Stadium: Enghelab

23 November 2024 4	Sanat Naft (2)	1–0	Aluminium Arak (1)	Abadan
18:30				Stadium: Takhti

24 November 2024 4	Shahrdari Noshahr (2)	3–0	Shahrdari Astara (2)	Karaj
16:15				Stadium: Enghelab

24 November 2024 4	Be'sat Kermanshah (2)	1–0	Shahrdari Bandar Abbas (3)	Kermanshah
16:30				Stadium: Azadi

24 November 2024 4	Palayesh Naft Bandar Abbas (2)	2–0	YASA Tehran (3)	Bandar Abbas
17:30				Stadium: Khalij Fars

12 December 2024 4	Esteghlal (1)	1–0	Mes Kerman (2)	Shahr-e Qods
16:15	Rezavand (yellow card) 35' (yellow-red card) 50'; Blanco 49'			Stadium: Shahr-e Qods; Attendance: 0 (NC); Referee: Morteza Mansourian

24 November 2024 4	Chadormalou (1)	2–2 (a.e.t.) (3–4 p)	Malavan (1)	Yazd
16:15				Stadium: Shahid Nasiri

=== Round of 16 ===
Number of teams per tier still in competition
Pro League	Azadegan League	League 2	Provincial Leagues	Total
11 / 16	5 / 18	0 / 28	0 / 34	16 / 96

12 February 2025 5	Shahrdari Noshahr (2)	1–0 (a.e.t.)	Palayesh Naft Bandar Abbas (2)	Chaloos
14:00				Stadium: Shohada

12 February 2025 5	Sepahan (1)	3–2 (a.e.t.)	Persepolis (1)	Isfahan
15:30				Stadium: Naghsh-e Jahan Stadium

13 February 2025 5	Mes Rafsanjan (1)	0–1	Nassaji (1)	Rafsanjan
15:00				Stadium: Shohadaye Mes

13 February 2025 5	Paykan (2)	3–2 (a.e.t.)	Foolad (1)	Shahr Qods
15:30				Stadium: Shohada

13 February 2025 5	Shams Azar (1)	1–2 (a.e.t.)	Esteghlal (1)	Qazvin
15:30				Stadium: Sardar Azadegan

13 February 2025 5	Sanat Naft (2)	2–0	Be'sat Kermanshah (2)	Abadan
16:00				Stadium: Takhti

14 February 2025 5	Gol Gohar (1)	0–0 (a.e.t.) (4–2 p)	Kheybar (1)	Sirjan
15:00				Stadium: Sardar Soleymani

14 February 2025 5	Malavan (1)	1–0 (a.e.t.)	Zob Ahan (1)	Bandar-e Anzali
15:00				Stadium: Sirous Ghayeghran Stadium

=== Quarter-finals ===
Number of teams per tier still in competition
Pro League	Azadegan League	League 2	Provincial Leagues	Total
5 / 16	3 / 18	0 / 28	0 / 34	8 / 96

25 April 2025 6	Nassaji (1)	1–3	Gol Gohar (1)	Qaemshahr
18:00	Bagheri 86' (pen.)		Ousmane N'Dong 18', 55'; Ashouri 26'	Stadium: Vatani

26 April 2025 6	Malavan (1)	0–0 (a.e.t.) (4–2 p)	Sepahan (1)	Bandar-e Anzali
16:30				Stadium: Sirous Ghayeghran Stadium
	Penalties
	Eslamikhah (penalty scored); Entezari (penalty scored); Sadeghi (penalty scored); Abdi (penalty scored)		Karimi (penalty scored); Shekari (penalty missed); Nzonzi (penalty scored); Asadi (penalty missed)

26 April 2025 6	Esteghlal (1)	1–0	Paykan (2)	Tehran
19:30	Ramin Rezaeian 74' (pen.)			Stadium: Azadi Stadium

26 April 2025 6	Sanat Naft (2)	1–0	Shahrdari Noshahr (2)	Abadan
19:30	Taleb Rikani 60' (pen.)			Stadium: Takhti

=== Semi-finals ===
Number of teams per tier still in competition
Pro League	Azadegan League	League 2	Provincial Leagues	Total
3 / 16	1 / 18	0 / 28	0 / 34	4 / 96

23 May 2025 7	Gol Gohar (1)	0—1	Malavan (1)	Sardar Soleymani
19:30			Jafari; 77'	Referee: Amir Arab Baraghi

24 May 2025 7	Esteghlal (1)	2–0	Sanat Naft (2)	Azadi Stadium
19:45	Koushki 44'; Juma 57'

=== Final ===
Number of teams per tier still in competition
Pro League	Azadegan League	League 2	Provincial Leagues	Total
2 / 16	0 / 18	0 / 28	0 / 34	2 / 96

29 May 2025 8	Esteghlal	1–0 (a.e.t.)	Malavan	Imam Khomeini Stadium
19:45	Cheshmi 120'			Referee: Mooud Bonyadifard

== See also ==
- 2024–25 Persian Gulf Pro League
- 2024–25 Azadegan League
- 2024–25 2nd Division
- 2024–25 3rd Division
- 2024 Iranian Super Cup
