= 2022–23 Esteghlal F.C. season =

Esteghlal
2022–23 season
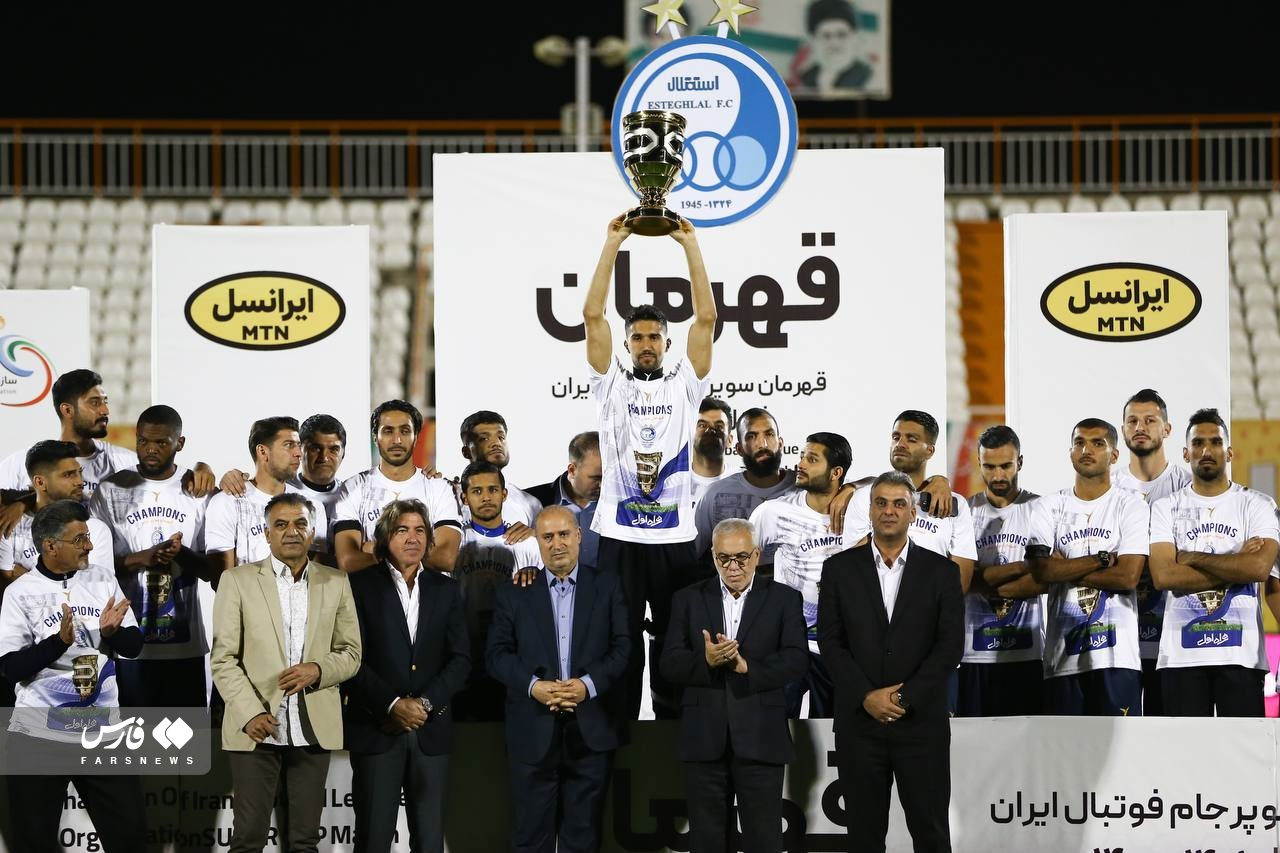
- President: Mostafa Ajorlu (until 15 October 2022); Ali Fatollahzadeh (from 15 October 2022 until 11 April 2023); Hojjat Karimi (from 11 April 2023)
- Head coach: Ricardo Sá Pinto
- Stadium: Azadi Stadium
- Persian Gulf Pro League: 3rd
- Hazfi Cup: Runner-up
- Iranian Super Cup: Winners
- Top goalscorer: League: Mehdi Ghayedi (12); All: Mehdi Ghayedi (12)
- Highest home attendance: 35,000
- Lowest home attendance: 0 (spectator ban)
- Biggest win: Esteghlal 7–1 Tractor
- Biggest defeat: Esteghlal 0–2 Sepahan; Tractor 2–0 Esteghlal
Home colours	Away colours
- All statistics correct as of 31 May 2023.

The 2022–23 Esteghlal Football Club season is the 77th season and the club's 29th consecutive season in the top flight of Iranian football. In addition to the domestic league, Esteghlal are participating in this season's editions of the Hazfi Cup, and the Iranian Super Cup.

Esteghlal did not play any matches between 2 November and 16 December due to a mid-season break in accommodation of the 2022 FIFA World Cup in Qatar. Persian Gulf Pro League was suspended after matchday 11.

== Players ==
Last updated: 3 March 2023

No.	Name	Nat	Position	Date of Birth (Age)	Since	End	Signed from
Goalkeepers
1	Hossein Hosseini	(Iran)	GK	30 June 1992 (aged 30)	2012	2023	(Iran) Youth Sector
90	Sina Saeidifar	(Iran)	GK	12 April 2001 (aged 21)	2020	2024	(Iran) Youth Sector
98	Alireza Rezaei	(Iran)	GK	11 December 1999 (aged 23)	2021	2024	(Iran) Paykan
Defenders
2	Saleh Hardani	(Iran)	RB / RM	14 September 1998 (aged 24)	2022	2024	(Iran) Foolad
3	Mohammad Hossein Moradmand	(Iran)	CB	22 June 1993 (aged 29)	2020	2023	(Iran) Shahr Khodro
5	Aref Gholami	(Iran)	CB	19 April 1997 (aged 25)	2019	2023	(Iran) Foolad
11	Arthur Yamga	(France)	RB / RW	7 September 1996 (aged 26)	2021	2025	(Denmark) Vejle
17	Jafar Salmani	(Iran)	LB / RB / LW	12 January 1997 (aged 25)	2021	2023	(Portugal) Portimonense
33	Abolfazl Jalali	(Iran)	LB / CB / LM	26 June 1998 (aged 24)	2021	2024	(Iran) Saipa
55	Raphael Silva	(Brazil)	CB	20 April 1992 (aged 30)	2022	2024	(Saudi Arabia) Al Faisaly
Midfielders
4	Rouzbeh Cheshmi	(Iran)	DM / CB	24 July 1993 (aged 29)	2021	2024	(Qatar) Umm Salal
8	Saeid Mehri	(Iran)	CM / AM / DM	16 September 1995 (aged 27)	2021	2024	(Iran) Tractor
9	Mehdi Mehdipour	(Iran)	CM / DM / AM	18 February 1994 (aged 28)	2020	2024	(Iran) Zob Ahan
14	Zobeir Niknafs	(Iran)	DM / CM	12 April 1993 (aged 29)	2021	2024	(Iran) Foolad
19	Reza Mirzaei	(Iran)	RW / LW	14 April 1996 (aged 26)	2022	2024	(Iran) Sepahan
26	Omid Hamedifar	(Iran)	DM / CB	20 August 2000 (aged 22)	2022	2024	(Iran) Sanat Naft
80	Mohammad Hossein Zavari	(Iran)	CM / AM	11 January 2001 (aged 21)	2022	2024	(Iran) Sanat Naft
88	Arash Rezavand	(Iran)	AM / CM / DM	5 October 1993 (aged 29)	2019	2024	(Iran) Saipa
99	Amirali Sadeghi	(Iran)	LW / AM	9 February 2001 (aged 21)	2021	2024	(Iran) Saipa
Forwards
10	Sajjad Shahbazzadeh	(Iran)	CF / LW	23 January 1990 (aged 32)	2022	2024	(Iran) Sepahan
18	Peyman Babaei	(Iran)	CF / RW / LW	14 December 1994 (aged 28)	2022	2024	(Iran) Tractor
20	Mehdi Ghayedi	(Iran)	LW / CF	5 December 1998 (aged 24)	2022	2023	(United Arab Emirates) Shabab Al Ahli
23	Arman Ramezani	(Iran)	CF	22 June 1992 (aged 30)	2021	2024	(Iran) Persepolis
72	Amir Arsalan Motahari	(Iran)	CF / RW	10 March 1993 (aged 29)	2020	2024	(Iran) Zob Ahan
77	Mohammad Mohebi	(Iran)	RW / LW / CF	20 December 1998 (aged 24)	2022	2023	(Portugal) Santa Clara
Players transferred during the season
7	Siavash Yazdani	(Iran)	CB	2 March 1992 (aged 30)	2019	2024	(Iran) Sepahan
30	Azizbek Amonov	(Uzbekistan)	LM / AM	30 October 1997 (aged 25)	2022	2024	(Uzbekistan) Lokomotiv

== Transfers ==
=== In ===
Date	Pos.	Player	From	Type	Ref.
27 June 2022	FW	(Iran) Sajjad Shahbazzadeh	Sepahan	Transfer	
28 June 2022	MF	(Iran) Omid Hamedifar	Sanat Naft	Transfer	
29 June 2022	MF	(Iran) Mohammad Hossein Zavari	Sanat Naft	Transfer	
30 June 2022	MF	(Iran) Reza Mirzaei	Sepahan	Transfer	
1 July 2022	MF	(Iran) Arash Rezavand	Foolad	End of loan	
1 July 2022	FW	(Iran) Amin Ghaseminejad	Gol Gohar	End of loan	
1 July 2022	MF	(Iran) Sina Khadempour	Naft MIS	End of loan	
1 July 2022	MF	(Iran) Zakaria Moradi	Malavan	End of loan	
1 July 2022	DF	(Iran) Matin Karimzadeh	Nassaji	End of loan	
1 July 2022	DF	(Iran) Arash Dajliri	Havadar	End of loan	
1 July 2022	MF	(Iran) Fardin Rabet	Shahr Khodro	End of loan	
6 July 2022	DF	(Iran) Mohammad Hosseini	Havadar	Transfer	
9 July 2022	FW	(Iran) Peyman Babaei	Tractor	Transfer	
14 July 2022	DF	(Iran) Mohammad Hossein Moradmand	Malavan	End of loan	
11 August 2022	FW	(Iran) Mohammad Mohebi	(Portugal) Santa Clara	Loan	
12 August 2022	FW	(Iran) Mehdi Ghayedi	(United Arab Emirates) Shabab Al Ahli	Loan	
14 August 2022	DF	(Iran) Siavash Yazdani	Malavan	End of loan	

=== Out ===
Date	Pos.	Player	To	Type	Ref.
1 June 2022	FW	(Benin) Rudy Gestede	Retired		
27 June 2022	DF	(Iran) Mohammad Daneshgar	Sepahan	Transfer	
16 July 2022	MF	(Iran) Reza Azari	Released		
16 July 2022	DF	(Iran) Arash Dajliri	Released		
19 July 2022	MF	(Iran) Alireza Khodabakhshi	Havadar	Transfer	
24 July 2022	DF	(Iran) Mohammad Javad Behafarin	Released		
25 July 2022	DF	(Iran) Matin Karimzadeh	Nassaji Mazandaran	Transfer	
26 July 2022	FW	(Iran) Amin Ghaseminejad	Sanat Naft	Transfer	
29 July 2022	DF	(Iran) Voria Ghafouri	Foolad	End of contract	
6 August 2022	FW	(Iran) Moein Enayati	Fajr Sepasi	Transfer	
20 August 2022	DF	(Iran) Mohammad Hosseini	Tractor	Transfer	
22 August 2022	MF	(Iran) Amirhossein Hosseinzadeh	(Belgium) Charleroi	Transfer	
25 August 2022	MF	(Iran) Fardin Rabet	(Sweden) Dalkurd	Transfer	
26 August 2022	MF	(Iran) Zakaria Moradi	Chooka Talesh	Transfer	
26 August 2022	MF	(Iran) Sina Khadempour	Chooka Talesh	Transfer	
24 January 2023	MF	(Iran) Erfan Bagheri	Saipa	Loan	
26 January 2023	DF	(Iran) Siavash Yazdani	Sepahan	Released	
1 March 2023	MF	(Uzbekistan) Azizbek Amonov	(Uzbekistan) Nasaf	Contract termination	

== Pre-season and friendlies ==
(King Reza) Taj Pahlavi and Ataturk Peace Cup

21 July 2022 Friendly	Gençlerbirliği (Turkey)	0–0	(Iran) Esteghlal	Ankara, Turkey
17:00 UTC+3		Report

23 July 2022 Friendly	Fatih Karagümrük (Turkey)	0–2	(Iran) Esteghlal	Ankara, Turkey
16:00 UTC+3		Report	Sadeghi 77', 90'

24 July 2022 Friendly	Esteghlal (Iran)	Cancelled	(Qatar) Al-Wakrah	Ankara, Turkey
		Report

27 July 2022 Friendly	Ankara Keçiörengücü (Turkey)	2–1	(Iran) Esteghlal	Ankara, Turkey
16:00 UTC+3		Report	Gholami

28 July 2022 Friendly	Esteghlal (Iran)	1–0	(Azerbaijan) Sumgayit	Ankara, Turkey
16:30 UTC+3	Mehdipour	Report

4 August 2022 Friendly	Esteghlal	3–0	Damash Tehran	Tehran
17:15 IRDT (UTC+04:30)	Motahari 30' (pen.); Sadeghi 65'; Amonov 90'	Report		Stadium: Dastgerdi

5 August 2022 Friendly	Esteghlal	1–1	Havadar	Tehran
11:10 IRDT (UTC+04:30)	Sadeghi 40'	Report	Abbasi 85'	Stadium: Dastgerdi

20 September 2022 Friendly	Esteghlal	2–0	Summit	Tehran
	Mohebi 30'; Sadeghi 35'	Report		Stadium: Ararat

24 September 2022 Friendly	Esteghlal	1–2	Iran national football team	Tehran
	Mohebi 45'	Report	Ousani 2', 10'	Stadium: Ararat

30 November 2022 Friendly	Esteghlal	1–2	Havadar	Tehran
	Rezavand 65'	Report	Pourghaz 90+12' (pen.); Zavoshi 90+14'

5 December 2022 Friendly	Esteghlal	Cancelled	Saipa	Tehran
		Report		Stadium: Azadi
Note: The game was canceled due to heavy rain.

8 December 2022 Friendly	Esteghlal	1–1	Naft MIS	Tehran
12:10 IRST (UTC+03:30)	Motahari 6'	Report	Miri 15' (pen.)	Stadium: Azadi

12 December 2022 Friendly	Esteghlal	5–0	Malavan	Tehran
12:00 IRST (UTC+03:30)	Mohebi (pen.); Ghayedi; Amonov; Motahari	Report		Stadium: Azadi (No. 4); Referee: Seyyed Mehdi Seyyad Ali

13 March 2023 Friendly	Esteghlal	3–1	Spad Alvand	Tehran
	Ramezani; Sadeghi; Mirzaei	Report	Goal

18 March 2023 Friendly	Esteghlal	2–2	Nassaji	Tehran
12:30 IRST (UTC+03:30)	Ghayedi 1'; Shahbazzadeh 55' (pen.)	Report	Davaran 78'; Niane 90+3'	Stadium: Karegaran; Attendance: 0(NC)
Note: The match was played behind closed doors.

16 April 2023 Friendly	Esteghlal	4–2	Shahid Ouraki	Tehran
12:30 IRST (UTC+03:30)	Ramezani; Niknafs (pen.); Yamga; Zavari	Report

== Competitions ==
=== Overview ===
Competition	First match	Last match	Starting round	Final position	Record							
Competition	First match	Last match	Starting round	Final position	Pld	W	D	L	GF	GA	GD	Win %
Persian Gulf Pro League	12 August 2022	18 May 2023	Matchday 1	3rd	30	18	8	4	52	22	+30	60.00
Hazfi Cup	12 January 2023	31 May 2023	Round of 32	Runners-up	5	4	0	1	10	3	+7	80.00
Iranian Super Cup	7 November 2022		Final	Winners	1	1	0	0	1	0	+1	100.00
Total					36	23	8	5	63	25	+38	63.89

Last updated: 31 May 2023
Source: Soccerway

=== Persian Gulf Pro League ===
==== Standings ====
Pos	Team	Pld	W	D	L	GF	GA	GD	Pts	Qualification or relegation
1	Persepolis (C)	30	20	6	4	46	13	+33	66	Qualification for 2023–24 AFC Champions League group stage
2	Sepahan	30	19	8	3	49	17	+32	65	Qualification for 2023–24 AFC Champions League group stage
3	Esteghlal (Note: Esteghlal did not pay its debts on time and did not obtain an AFC license. They were therefore unable to participate in AFC competitions.)	30	18	8	4	52	22	+30	62	
4	Tractor	30	15	7	8	42	34	+8	52	Qualification for 2023–24 AFC Champions League qualifying play-offs
5	Mes Rafsanjan	30	11	14	5	30	15	+15	47	

Source: Iran Football League Organization - League Full Table, Iplstats
Rules for classification: 1) Points; 2) Head-to-head points; 3) Head-to-head goal difference; 4) Total goal difference; 5) Total goals scored; 6) Play-off at neutral venue.

==== Results summary ====
Overall								Home						Away					
Pld	W	D	L	GF	GA	GD	Pts	W	D	L	GF	GA	GD	W	D	L	GF	GA	GD
30	18	8	4	52	22	+30	62	8	6	1	32	11	+21	10	2	3	20	11	+9

Source: Ipl Stats

==== Results by round ====
Matchday	1	2	3	4	5	6	7	8	9	10	11	12	13	14	15	16	17	18	19	20	21	22	23	24	25	26	27	28	29	30
Ground	H	A	H	A	H	H	A	H	A	H	A	H	A	H	A	A	H	A	H	A	A	H	A	H	A	H	A	H	A	H
Result	L	W	W	D	D	W	W	D	W	D	W	D	W	D	L	L	W	W	W	W	D	W	W	W	W	W	L	D	W	W
Position	16	6	2	4	6	3	2	3	2	3	2	3	2	2	4	4	4	3	3	3	3	3	2	2	2	1	3	3	3	3

Updated to match(es) played on 18 May 2023. Source: "Iran Football League Organization - League Full Table".
A = Away; H = Home; W = Win; L = Loss

==== Matches ====
The league fixtures were announced on 25 July 2022.

12 August 2022 1	Esteghlal	0–2	Sepahan	Tehran
19:05 IRDT (UTC+04:30)		Report	Rezaeian (yellow card) 6' (goal) 57'; Alinejad (yellow card) 49'; Salmani 52'; Karimi (yellow card) 90+1'	Stadium: Azadi; Attendance: 0 (Note: The match was played behind closed doors due to the problems of the electronic ticketing system of the clubs.); Referee: Bijan Heydari

18 August 2022 2	Malavan	1–3	Esteghlal	Bandar-e Anzali
19:00 IRDT (UTC+04:30)	Bazgir 27'; Momeni (yellow card) 34'	Report	Hardani (yellow card) 45+4'; Mehdipour (yellow card) 55' (goal) 98' (pen.); Gholami 58'; Ghayedi 79'	Stadium: Sirous Ghayeghran; Attendance: 0 Referee: Seyed Reza Mahdavi

25 August 2022 3	Esteghlal	1–0	Mes Kerman	Tehran
19:00 IRDT (UTC+04:30)	Yamga 75'; Babaei (yellow card) 77'; Hardani (yellow card) 77'; Jalali (yellow card) 85'; Ghayedi (yellow card) 88'	Report	Asgari (yellow card) 31'; Shahdadnejad (yellow card) 61'; Ghaseminejad (yellow card) 76'; Nasiri (yellow card) 78'	Stadium: Azadi; Attendance: 30,000; Referee: Hassan Akrami

30 August 2022 4	Naft MIS	0–0	Esteghlal	Masjed Soleyman
20:30 IRDT (UTC+04:30)	Karimi (yellow card) 45+3'	Report	Hardani (yellow card) 9'; Cheshmi (yellow card) 61'; Mehri (yellow card) 90+3'	Stadium: Behnam Mohammadi; Attendance: 10,000; Referee: Payam Heydari

6 September 2022 5	Esteghlal	0–0	Paykan	Tehran
19:30 IRDT (UTC+04:30)	Mehdipour (yellow card) 42'; Babaei (yellow card) 66'	Report		Stadium: Azadi; Attendance: 20,000; Referee: Mouood Bonyadifar

10 September 2022 6	Esteghlal	3–1	Nassaji	Tehran
18:30 IRDT (UTC+04:30)	Babaei (yellow card) 3' (goal) 4'; Cheshmi (yellow card) 10'; Yamga 44' (pen.); Mohebi (yellow card) 49' (goal) 50'	Report	Gholamalibeygi (yellow card) 37'; Janmaleki (yellow card) 45' (yellow-red card) 48'; Kalantari 81'	Stadium: Azadi; Attendance: 25,000; Referee: Yaser Hamrang

1 October 2022 7	Gol Gohar	1–2	Esteghlal	Sirjan
18:30 IRST (UTC+03:30)	Tikdari 54'; Shekari (yellow card) 60'; Alizadeh (yellow card) 77'; Ashouri (yellow card) 79'; Ghaseminejad (yellow card) 90+2'	Report	Mohebi 29'; Silva (yellow card) 77'; Mehdipour (yellow card) 79'; Hosseini (yellow card) 90+5'; Yamga 90+8' (pen.)	Stadium: Shahid Qasem Soleimani; Attendance: 0 (Note: According to the decision of Province Security Council, the match was played behind closed doors.); Referee: Amir Arab Baraghi

7 October 2022 8	Esteghlal	1–1	Foolad	Tehran
17:00 IRST (UTC+03:30)	Mohebi 61'; Mirzaei (yellow card) 76'; Silva (yellow card) 84'	Report	Aliyari 16'; Ansari (yellow card) 48'	Stadium: Azadi; Attendance: 0 Referee: Hamid Haj Malek

14 October 2022 9	Zob Ahan	0–1	Esteghlal	Fooladshahr
17:30 IRST (UTC+03:30)	Sedghi (yellow card) 30'; Sadeghi (yellow card) 80'	Report	Ghoreishi 90+1' (o.g.)	Stadium: Foolad Shahr; Attendance: 0 Referee: Payam Heydari

21 October 2022 10	Esteghlal	0–0	Aluminium Arak	Tehran
17:00 IRST (UTC+03:30)	Cheshmi (yellow card) 50'; Salmani (yellow card) 80'; Motahari (yellow card) 90+4'; Mohebi (yellow card) 90+5'	Report	Mohammadzadeh (yellow card) 42'; Sharifat (yellow card) 84' (yellow-red card) 85'	Stadium: Azadi; Attendance: 0 Referee: Vahid Kazemi

28 October 2022 11	Havadar	0–1	Esteghlal	Tehran
16:00 IRST (UTC+03:30)	Entezari (yellow card) 79'	Report	Mohebi 8' (yellow card) 90+4'; Mehri (yellow card) 50'	Stadium: Dastgerdi; Attendance: 0 Referee: Hassan Akrami

Mid-season break for 2022 FIFA World Cup

16 December 2022 12	Esteghlal	2 – 2	Persepolis	Tehran
17:30 IRST (UTC+03:30)	Mehri (yellow card) 18'; Cheshmi 30'; Motahari 50'; Rezavand (yellow card) 65'	Report	Gvelesiani 16', 90'	Stadium: Azadi; Attendance: 0 Referee: Mohammed Hossein Zahedi Fard

25 December 2022 13	Sanat Naft	0–1	Esteghlal	Abadan
18:00 IRST (UTC+03:30)	Ghanbari (yellow card) 62'; Mirdoraghi (yellow card) 89'; Garousian (yellow card) 90+4'	Report	Mehri (yellow card) 19'; Mohebi (yellow card) 29'; Yamga (yellow card) 34' (goal) 86' (pen.); Hardani (yellow card) 68'	Stadium: Takhti; Attendance: 0 Referee: Bijan Heydari

30 December 2022 14	Esteghlal	0–0	Mes Rafsanjan	Tehran
15:00 IRST (UTC+03:30)		Report		Stadium: Azadi; Attendance: 0 Referee: Amir Arab Baraghi

6 January 2023 15	Tractor	2–0	Esteghlal	Tabriz
14:00 IRST (UTC+03:30)	Asadi (yellow card) 13'; Ghanbari 36', 53'; Alves (yellow card) 55'; Vagenin (yellow card) 86'	Report	Yamga (yellow card) 65'; Cheshmi (yellow card) 70'	Stadium: Shahid Qasem Soleimani; Attendance: 0 Referee: Vahid Kazemi

19 January 2023 16	Sepahan	2–1	Esteghlal	Isfahan
16:30 IRST (UTC+03:30)	Moghanlou (yellow card) 36'; Noorafkan 50'; Karimi (yellow card) 86'; Rezaeian 90+5' (pen.)	Report	Hardani (yellow card) 23'; Motahari 58'; Babaei (yellow card) 75'; Mohebi (yellow card) 79'	Stadium: Naghsh-e-Jahan; Attendance: 0 Referee: Hassan Akrami

26 January 2023 17	Esteghlal	4–0	Malavan	Tehran
15:00 IRST (UTC+03:30)	Silva (yellow card) 34'; Ghazipour 36' (o.g.); Mohebi 44'; Cheshmi (yellow card) 45+3' (goal) 86'; Motahari 75'; Mirzaei (yellow card) 86'	Report	Khoshkafa (yellow card) 17'	Stadium: Azadi; Attendance: 1,500; Referee: Seyyed Mehdi Seyyad Ali

2 February 2023 18	Mes Kerman	2–3	Esteghlal	Kerman
17:00 IRST (UTC+03:30)	Abbasian 10' (yellow card) 87'; Ghaseminejad (yellow card) 42'; Rostami 90+7'	Report	Khodaei 19' (o.g.); Gholami (yellow card) 40'; Mehri (yellow card) 53'; Salmani 70'; Ghayedi 73'; Ramezani (yellow card) 83'	Stadium: Shahid Bahonar; Attendance: 5,000; Referee: Yaser Hamrang

7 February 2023 19	Esteghlal	3–1	Naft MIS	Tehran
15:30 IRST (UTC+03:30)	Rezavand 5'; Ghayedi 55', 90+1'	Report	Karimi (yellow card) 45'; Sheykh-Soleimani 90+3'	Stadium: Azadi; Attendance: 3,000; Referee: Hamid Hajmalek

13 February 2023 20	Paykan	0–2	Esteghlal	Tehran
14:00 IRST (UTC+03:30)	Temirov (yellow card) 41'; Taher (yellow card) 44'; Hosseini (yellow card) 62'; Azadeh (yellow card) 90+5' (yellow-red card) 90+5'	Report	Ghayedi 11' (yellow card) 23'; Hardani 84'	Stadium: Dastgerdi; Attendance: 0 Referee: Bijan Heydari

28 February 2023 21	Nassaji	1–1	Esteghlal	Qaem Shahr
15:00 IRST (UTC+03:30)	Yamga (yellow card) 35'; Motahari 53'; Cheshmi (yellow card) 68'	Report	Abdi (yellow card) 18'; Hardani (yellow card) 40'; Kalantari 68'	Stadium: Vatani; Attendance: 15,000; Referee: Amir Arab Baraghi

6 March 2023 22	Esteghlal	2–1	Gol Gohar	Tehran
16:45 IRST (UTC+03:30)	Mirzaei 90+1'; Yamga 90+13' (pen.)	Report	Sohrabian 24'; Golzari (yellow card) 63'; Pourali (yellow card) 71'; Bagnama (red card) 90+11'	Stadium: Azadi; Attendance: 10,000; Referee: Mouood Bonyadifar

12 March 2023 23	Foolad	0–2	Esteghlal	Ahvaz
19:00 IRST (UTC+03:30)	Ghobeishavi (yellow card) 69'	Report	Mehri (yellow card) 43'; Yamga 52'; Ghayedi 77'; Hosseini (yellow card) 90+3'	Stadium: Foolad Arena; Attendance: 30,000; Referee: Mohammed Hossein Zahedi Fard

31 March 2023 24	Esteghlal	2–0	Zob Ahan	Tehran
19:30 IRST (UTC+03:30)	Mehdipour (yellow card) 54'; Ghayedi 20'; Yamga 63' (pen.); Cheshmi (yellow card) 66'; Niknafs (yellow card) 90+2'	Report	Pourali (yellow card) 52'	Stadium: Azadi; Attendance: 15,000; Referee: Seyed Reza Mahdavi

7 April 2023 25	Aluminium Arak	0–1	Esteghlal	Arak
19:30 IRST (UTC+03:30)	Hooshmand (yellow card) 90+3'	Report	Niknafs (yellow card) 11'; Ghayedi 55'; Yamga (yellow card) 71'; Mehri (yellow card) 74'; Silva (yellow card) 90+4'	Stadium: Imam Khomeini; Attendance: 25,000; Referee: Payam Heydari

15 April 2023 26	Esteghlal	6–1	Havadar	Tehran
19:30 IRST (UTC+03:30)	Rezavand 46'; Mohebi 64', 75' (pen.); Mehri 85'; Ghayedi 88'; Hosseini 90+3'	Report	Shojaei (yellow card) 55'; Gerami (yellow card) 79'; Sefid-Choghaei 84'; Miri (yellow card) 90+1'	Stadium: Azadi; Attendance: 10,000; Referee: Mouood Bonyadifar

23 April 2023 27	Persepolis	1–0	Esteghlal	Tehran
16:00 IRST (UTC+03:30)	Sarlak (yellow card) 29'; Alekasir 50' (yellow card) 50'	Report	Gholami (yellow card) 19'; Mohebi (yellow card) 90+4'	Stadium: Azadi; Attendance: 45,000; Referee: Payam Heydari

5 May 2023 28	Esteghlal	1–1	Sanat Naft	Tehran
18:00 IRST (UTC+03:30)	Babaei 45' (pen.); Motahari (yellow card) 90+3'	Report	Albughubeysh (yellow card) 20'; Yousefi (yellow card) 35'; Mamizadeh 62'	Stadium: Azadi; Attendance: 15,000; Referee: Kopal Nazemi

12 May 2023 29	Mes Rafsanjan	1–2	Esteghlal	Rafsanjan
18:00 IRST (UTC+03:30)	Hosseini 74'; Rezaei (yellow card) 79'	Report	Moradmand 77'; Mohebi 81'; Hosseini (yellow card) 88'	Stadium: Shohadaye Mes Rafsanjan; Attendance: 5,000; Referee: Seyyed Mehdi Seyyad Ali

18 May 2023 30	Esteghlal	7–1	Tractor	Tehran
18:00 IRST (UTC+03:30)	Ghayedi 17' (pen.), 43', 61'; Mehri (yellow card) 34'; Jalali 45+1'; Cheshmi (red card) 69'; Moradmand 75'; Rezavand 78'; Silva (yellow card) 80'; Salmani 87'	Report	Asadi (yellow card) 15'; Ghanbari 59'; Ghaderi (yellow card) 68' (yellow-red card) 69'	Stadium: Azadi; Referee: Reza Adel

==== Score overview ====
Win Draw Loss

Opposition	Home score	Away score	Aggregate score	Double
Aluminium	0–0	1–0	1–0	No
Foolad	1–1	2–0	3–1	No
Gol Gohar	2–1	2–1	4–2	Yes
Havadar	6–1	1–0	7–1	Yes
Malavan	4–0	3–1	7–1	Yes
Mes Kerman	1–0	3–2	4–2	Yes
Mes Rafsanjan	0–0	2–1	2–1	No
Naft MIS	3–1	0–0	3–1	No
Nassaji	3–1	1–1	4–2	No
Paykan	0–0	2–0	2–0	No
Persepolis	2–2	0–1	2–3	No
Sanat Naft	1–1	1–0	2–1	No
Sepahan	0–2	1–2	1–4	No
Tractor	7–1	0–2	7–3	No
Zob Ahan	2–0	1–0	3–0	Yes

=== Hazfi Cup ===
Esteghlal entered the tournament in the round of 32.

12 January 2023 Round of 32	Esteghlal	2–1 (a.e.t.)	Tractor	Tehran
15:00 IRST (UTC+03:30)	Mehdipour (yellow card) 70'; Mehri (yellow card) 83'; Hardani (yellow card) 89'; Yamga 111' (pen.), 120+3' (pen.)	Report	Hadi (yellow card) 59'; Ghaderi (yellow card) 87'; Asadi 93'; Rezaei (yellow card) 106'; Mohammadi (red card) 120+1'	Stadium: Azadi; Attendance: 0 Referee: Kopal Nazemi

20 February 2023 Round of 16	Esteghlal	2–0	Malavan	Tehran
15:30 IRST (UTC+03:30)	Motahari 74'; Ramezani 79' (yellow card) 90+6'; Hamedifar (yellow card) 88'	Report	Eidi (yellow card) 32' (yellow-red card) 51'	Stadium: Azadi; Attendance: 10,000; Referee: Payam Heydari

29 April 2023 Quarter Final	Pars Jonoubi	0–1 (a.e.t.)	Esteghlal	Jam
17:30 IRST (UTC+03:30)	Hashemi (yellow card) 45+3'; Sinak (yellow card) 75'; Mousavi (yellow card) 90+1'; Tamimi (yellow card) 120+2'; Souri (red card) 120+4'	Report	Mohebi (penalty missed) 15'; Mehri (yellow card) 80' (goal) 97'	Stadium: Takhti; Attendance: 15,000; Referee: Ahmad Mohammadi

24 May 2023 Semi Final	Esteghlal	4–0	Nassaji	Tehran
18:30 IRST (UTC+03:30)	Rezavand 25'; Ebrahimi 34' (o.g.); Mehdipour (yellow card) 36'; Mohebi 57', 89'	Report	Kalantari (yellow card) 32'	Stadium: Azadi; Attendance: 35,000; Referee: Hassan Akrami

31 May 2023 Final	Esteghlal	1–2 (a.e.t.)	Persepolis	Tehran
19:45 IRST (UTC+03:30)	Babaei (yellow card) 46'; Cheshmi (yellow card) 69'; Moradmand 90+11'; Sá Pinto (red card) 90+12'	Report	Torabi 30' (yellow card) 69'; Rafiei (yellow card) 55'; Esmaeilifar (yellow card) 65'; Nemati (yellow card) 69'; Alekasir (yellow card) 90+6'; Alishah 115'; Abdi (yellow card) 120+2'	Stadium: Azadi; Attendance: 70,000; Referee: Ashkan Khorshidi
Note: 101st Tehran Derby

=== Iranian Super Cup ===
2 November 2022 Final	Esteghlal	1–0	Nassaji	Kerman
16:00 IRST (UTC+03:30)	Salmani (yellow card) 9'; Motahari 52'; Ghayedi (yellow card) 75'; Yamga (yellow card) 87'; Rezavand (yellow card) 90+1'	Report	Kalantari (yellow card) 15'; Janmaleki (yellow card) 71'	Stadium: Shahid bahonar Attendance: 0 Referee: Bijan Heydari

== Statistics ==
=== Squad statistics ===
No.	Pos	Nat	Player	Total		Pro League		Hazfi Cup		Super Cup	
No.	Pos	Nat	Player	Apps	Goals	Apps	Goals	Apps	Goals	Apps	Goals
1	GK	(Iran)	Hossein Hosseini	31	1	25	1	5	0	1	0
2	DF	(Iran)	Saleh Hardani	28	1	22	1	5	0	1	0
3	DF	(Iran)	Mohammad Hossein Moradmand	11	3	8	2	2	1	1	0
4	MF	(Iran)	Rouzbeh Cheshmi	33	2	27	2	5	0	1	0
5	DF	(Iran)	Aref Gholami	27	1	22	1	4	0	1	0
8	MF	(Iran)	Saeid Mehri	32	2	27	1	4	1	1	0
9	MF	(Iran)	Mehdi Mehdipour	23	1	19	1	3	0	1	0
10	FW	(Iran)	Sajjad Shahbazzadeh	20	0	16	0	4	0	0	0
11	FW	(France)	Arthur Yamga	29	9	26	7	2	2	1	0
14	MF	(Iran)	Zobeir Niknafs	21	0	17	0	4	0	0	0
17	MF	(Iran)	Jafar Salmani	34	2	29	2	4	0	1	0
18	FW	(Iran)	Peyman Babaei	31	2	25	2	5	0	1	0
19	MF	(Iran)	Reza Mirzaei	23	1	20	1	2	0	1	0
20	FW	(Iran)	Mehdi Ghayedi	35	12	29	12	5	0	1	0
23	FW	(Iran)	Arman Ramezani	20	1	15	0	5	1	0	0
26	MF	(Iran)	Omid Hamedifar	13	0	10	0	3	0	0	0
33	DF	(Iran)	Abolfazl Jalali	19	1	15	1	4	0	0	0
55	DF	(Brazil)	Raphael Silva	33	0	27	0	5	0	1	0
72	FW	(Iran)	Arsalan Motahari	29	6	23	4	5	1	1	1
77	FW	(Iran)	Mohammad Mohebi	34	10	28	8	5	2	1	0
80	MF	(Iran)	Mohammad Hossein Zavari	5	0	4	0	1	0	0	0
88	MF	(Iran)	Arash Rezavand	31	4	26	3	4	1	1	0
90	GK	(Iran)	Sina Saeidifar	2	0	2	0	0	0	0	0
98	GK	(Iran)	Alireza Rezaei	4	0	4	0	0	0	0	0
99	MF	(Iran)	Amirali Sadeghi	5	0	5	0	0	0	0	0
Players transferred/loaned out during the season
7	DF	(Iran)	Siavash Yazdani	5	0	4	0	1	0	0	0
30	MF	(Uzbekistan)	Azizbek Amonov	1	0	1	0	0	0	0	0

Last updated: 31 May 2023
Source: Competitions

=== Goals ===
The list is sorted by shirt number when total goals are equal.

Rank	Player	Pro League	Hazfi Cup	Super Cup	Total
1	(Iran) Mehdi Ghayedi	12	0	0	12
2	(Iran) Mohammad Mohebi	8	2	0	10
3	(France) Arthur Yamga	7	2	0	9
4	(Iran) Arsalan Motahari	4	1	1	6
5	(Iran) Arash Rezavand	3	1	0	4
6	(Iran) Mohammad Hossein Moradmand	2	1	0	3
7	(Iran) Rouzbeh Cheshmi	2	0	0	2
7	(Iran) Jafar Salmani	2	0	0	2
7	(Iran) Peyman Babaei	2	0	0	2
7	(Iran) Saeid Mehri	1	1	0	2
11	(Iran) Hossein Hosseini	1	0	0	1
11	(Iran) Saleh Hardani	1	0	0	1
11	(Iran) Aref Gholami	1	0	0	1
11	(Iran) Mehdi Mehdipour	1	0	0	1
11	(Iran) Reza Mirzaei	1	0	0	1
11	(Iran) Arman Ramezani	0	1	0	1
11	(Iran) Abolfazl Jalali	1	0	0	1
Own goals		3	1	0	3
Total		52	10	1	63

Last updated: 31 May 2023.
Source: Competitive matches

=== Clean sheets ===
Rank	Player	Pro League	Hazfi Cup	Super Cup	Total
1	(Iran) Hossein Hosseini	12	3	1	16
2	(Iran) Alireza Rezaei	1	0	0	1
Total		13	3	1	17

Last updated: 31 May 2023.
Source: Competitive matches

=== Disciplinary record ===
Includes all competitive matches. Players with 1 card or more are included only.

N	P	Nat.	Name	Pro League			Hazfi Cup			Super Cup			Total			Notes
N	P	Nat.	Name	Yellow card	Second yellow card	Red card	Yellow card	Second yellow card	Red card	Yellow card	Second yellow card	Red card	Yellow card	Second yellow card	Red card	Notes
1	GK	(Iran)	Hossein Hosseini	3									3			
2	DF	(Iran)	Saleh Hardani	6			1						7			
4	MF	(Iran)	Rouzbeh Cheshmi	7		1	1						8		1	
5	DF	(Iran)	Aref Gholami	2									2			
8	MF	(Iran)	Saeid Mehri	8			2						10			
9	MF	(Iran)	Mehdi Mehdipour	4			2						6			
11	FW	(France)	Arthur Yamga	4						1			5			
14	MF	(Iran)	Zobeir Niknafs	2									2			
17	MF	(Iran)	Jafar Salmani	1						1			2			
18	FW	(Iran)	Peyman Babaei	4			1						5			
19	MF	(Iran)	Reza Mirzaei	2									2			
20	FW	(Iran)	Mehdi Ghayedi	2						1			3			
23	FW	(Iran)	Arman Ramezani	1									1			
26	MF	(Iran)	Omid Hamedifar	2									2			
33	DF	(Iran)	Abolfazl Jalali	1									1			
55	DF	(Brazil)	Raphael Silva	5									5			
72	FW	(Iran)	Arsalan Motahari	2									2			
77	FW	(Iran)	Mohammad Mohebi	6									6			
88	MF	(Iran)	Arash Rezavand	1						1			2			

Last updated: 31 May 2023
Source: Soccerway
Only competitive matches
(yellow card) = Number of bookings; (second yellow card) = Number of sending offs after a second yellow card; (red card) = Number of sending offs by a direct red card.
