= Saleh Hardani =

Iranian footballer (botn 1998)

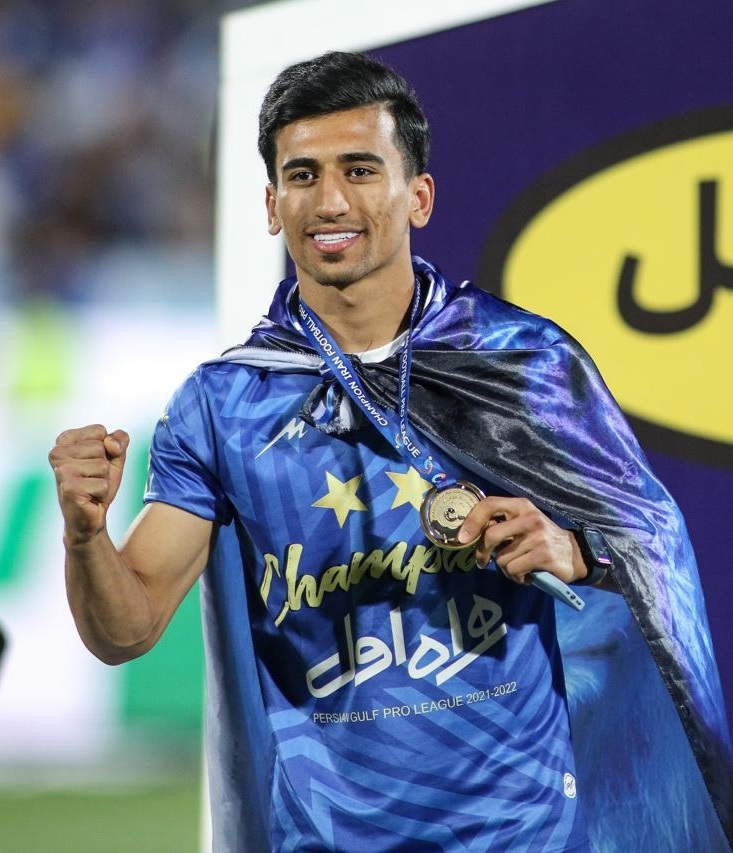
- Hardani with Esteghlal in 2022

Personal information
- Full name: Saleh Hardani Kherad
- Date of birth: 26 December 1998 (age 27)
- Place of birth: Ramhormoz, Iran
- Height: 1.76 m (5 ft 9 in)
- Positions: Right-back; right winger

Team information
- Current team: Esteghlal
- Number: 2

Youth career
- 2016–2019: Foolad

Senior career*
Years	Team	Apps	(Gls)
2019–2022	Foolad	55	(1)
2022–	Esteghlal	100	(5)
2025	Sepahan	12	(0)

International career^{‡}
2021–	Iran	24	(2)
- * Club domestic league appearances and goals as of 7 November 2026 ‡ National team caps and goals as of 17 November 2026

Saleh Hardani Kherad (Persian: صالح حردانی; born 26 December 1998), also known as Saadat Hardani, is an Iranian footballer who plays as a right-back for the Persian Gulf Pro League club Esteghlal and the Iran national team. He is younger brother of Saber Hardani.

== Club career ==
=== Foolad ===
He made his debut for Foolad in first fixtures of 2019–20 Iran Pro League against Sanat Naft Abadan.

=== Esteghlal ===
He joined Esteghlal for 2019–20 Iran Pro League and scored an important goal against his previous club, Foolad, which made Esteghlal the champion of the season.

== International Career ==
On 1 June 2026, he was named in the 26-man squad for the 2026 FIFA World Cup.

== Personal life ==
On 4 February 2026, Hardani responded to the 2025–2026 Iranian protests and the government's crackdown of the protests on his Instagram, saying: "He who is not sad in this time is either not a human being, or not in this world."

== Career statistics ==
=== Club ===
As of 7 November 2026

club	Season	League			Hazfi Cup		ACL		Other		Total	
club	Season	League	Apps	Goals	Apps	Goals	Apps	Goals	Apps	Goals	Apps	Goals
Foolad	2019–20	Persian Gulf Pro League	15	0	1	0	0	0	0	0	16	0
Foolad	2020–21	Persian Gulf Pro League	26	1	4	1	3	1	0	0	33	3
Foolad	2021–22	Persian Gulf Pro League	14	0	0	0	0	0	0	0	14	0
Foolad	Total		55	1	5	1	3	1	0	0	63	3
Esteghlal	2021–22	Persian Gulf Pro League	14	1	1	0	0	0	0	0	15	1
Esteghlal	2022–23	Persian Gulf Pro League	22	1	5	0	0	0	1	0	28	1
Esteghlal	2023–24	Persian Gulf Pro League	26	1	1	0	0	0	0	0	27	1
Esteghlal	2024–25	Persian Gulf Pro League	12	0	3	0	4	0	0	0	19	0
Esteghlal	2025–26	Persian Gulf Pro League	18	0	1	0	6	0	0	0	25	0
Esteghlal	2026–27	Persian Gulf Pro League	8	2	0	0	4	0	0	0	12	2
Esteghlal	Total		100	5	11	0	14	0	1	0	126	5
Sepahan	2024–25	Persian Gulf Pro League	12	0	1	0	5	0	1	0	19	0
Sepahan	Total		12	0	1	0	5	0	1	0	19	0
Career Total			167	6	17	1	22	1	2	0	208	8

=== International ===
As of match played 17 November 2026

Appearances and goals by national team and year
National team	Year	Apps	Goals
Iran	2021	1	0
Iran	2022	1	0
Iran	2023	1	0
Iran	2024	7	1
Iran	2025	6	0
Iran	2026	8	1
Total		24	2

List of international goals scored by Saleh Hardani
No.	Date	Venue	Opponent	Score	Result	Competition
1	19 November 2024	Dolen Omurzakov Stadium, Bishkek, Kyrgyzstan	Kyrgyzstan	2–0	3–2	2026 FIFA World Cup qualification
2	14 November 2026	Basra International Stadium, Basra, Iraq	Palestine	2–0	2–0	2026 Basra International Tournament

== Honours ==
Foolad

- Hazfi Cup: 2020–21

Sepahan

- Iranian Super Cup: 2024

Esteghlal

- Persian Gulf Pro League: 2021–22
- Hazfi Cup: 2024–25
- Iranian Super Cup: 2022
