= Sina Saeidifar =

Iranian footballer

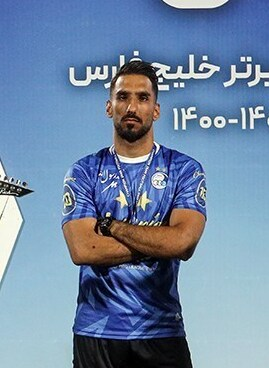

Personal information
- Full name: Sina Saeidifar
- Date of birth: 12 April 2001 (age 25)
- Place of birth: Tehran, Iran
- Height: 1.85 m (6 ft 1 in)
- Position: Goalkeeper

Team information
- Current team: Esteghlal
- Number: 90

Youth career
- 2015–2017: Moghavemat
- 2017–2018: Sorkhpooshan
- 2018–2019: Saipa
- 2019–2022: Esteghlal

Senior career*
Years	Team	Apps	(Gls)
2021–	Esteghlal	2	(0)
2023–2024	→ Shams Azar (loan)	2	(0)

International career^{‡}
2019	Iran U20		
2022–2024	Iran U23	1	(0)
- * Club domestic league appearances and goals as of 18 May 2024 ‡ National team caps and goals as of 7 February 2023

Sina Saeidifar (Persian: سینا سعیدی‌فر, born 12 April 2001) is an Iranian footballer who plays for Persian Gulf Pro League club Esteghlal and the Iran national team U23.

== Club career ==
=== Esteghlal ===
He joined Esteghlal in September 2021 with five-years contract. He made his debut on 7 February 2023 against Naft Masjed-Soleyman as a substitute for Alireza Rezaei.

== Honours ==
Esteghlal

- Persian Gulf Pro League: 2021–22
- Iranian Super Cup: 2022
