= Mohammad Hossein Zavari =

Iranian footballer

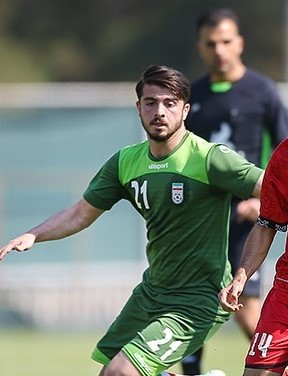
- Zavari with Iran U23 in 2022

Personal information
- Full name: Mohammad Hossein Zavari
- Date of birth: January 11, 2001 (age 25)
- Place of birth: Gorgan, Iran
- Height: 1.74 m (5 ft 9 in)
- Position: Midfielder

Team information
- Current team: Esteghlal Khuzestan
- Number: 88

Youth career
- 2017–2020: Saipa

Senior career*
Years	Team	Apps	(Gls)
2020–2022	Sanat Naft	30	(0)
2022–2024	Esteghlal	5	(0)
2024–2025	Havadar	26	(1)
2025–	Esteghlal Khuzestan	25	(1)

International career^{‡}
2019–2021	Iran U20		
2021–	Iran U23	4	(0)
- * Club domestic league appearances and goals as of 11 August 2023 ‡ National team caps and goals as of 6 March 2022

Mohammad Hossein Zavari (Persian: محمدحسین زواری; born January 11, 2001) is an Iranian football midfielder who currently plays for Esteghlal Khuzestan in the Persian Gulf Pro League.

== Career statistics ==
=== Club ===
Club	Season	League			Hazfi Cup		ACL		Total	
Club	Season	League	Apps	Goals	Apps	Goals	Apps	Goals	Apps	Goals
Sanat Naft	2020–21	Pro League	23	0	1	0	-	-	24	0
Sanat Naft	2021–22	Pro League	7	0	0	0	-	-	7	0
Sanat Naft	Total		30	0	1	0	-	-	31	0
Esteghlal	2022–23	Pro League	4	0	1	0	-	-	5	0
Esteghlal	2023–24	Pro League	1	0	0	0	-	-	1	0
Esteghlal	Total		5	0	1	0	-	-	6	0
Total			35	0	2	0	-	-	37	0

== Club career ==
=== Sanat Naft ===
He made his debut for Sanat Naft in 2nd fixture of 2020–21 Persian Gulf Pro League against Persepolis while he substituted in for Taleb Rikani.

== Honours ==
Esteghlal

- Iranian Super Cup: 2022
