= Abolfazl Jalali =

Iranian footballer (born 1998)

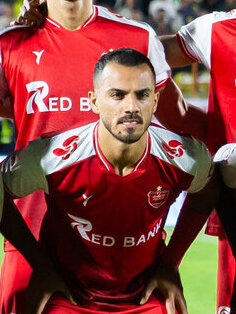
- Jalali with Persepolis in 2026

Personal information
- Full name: Abolfazl Jalali Bourani
- Date of birth: 26 June 1998 (age 28)
- Place of birth: Amol, Iran
- Height: 1.77 m (5 ft 10 in)
- Position: Left back

Team information
- Current team: Persepolis
- Number: 3

Youth career
- –2016: Padideh Sari
- 2016–2018: Saipa

Senior career*
Years	Team	Apps	(Gls)
2018–2021	Saipa	58	(1)
2021–2026	Esteghlal	87	(4)
2026–	Persepolis	7	(0)

International career^{‡}
2018–2019	Iran U23	6	(0)
2021–	Iran	8	(0)
Medal record
Representing Iran
CAFA Nations Cup
Runner-up	2025 Tajikistan–Uzbekistan	Team
- * Club domestic league appearances and goals as of 6 November 2026 ‡ National team caps and goals as of 8 September 2025

Abolfazl Jalali Bourani (Persian: ابوالفضل جلالی بورانی; born 26 June 1998) is an Iranian professional footballer who plays as a defender for Persian Gulf Pro League club Persepolis and the Iran national team.

== Club career ==
=== Saipa ===
He made his debut for Saipa in 12th fixtures of 2018–19 Iran Pro League against Machine Sazi while he substituted in for Moein Abbasian.

=== Esteghlal ===
Jalali joined Esteghlal Tehran in the 21st League transfers and he was one of the team's key players.

=== Persepolis ===
On 10 July 2026, Jalali joined Persian Gulf Pro League side Persepolis on a two-year deal.

== International career ==
Jalali played his first national match on 10 April 2021 at the age of 23 against Syria, which ended with a score of 3–0 in favor of Iran.

== Personal life ==
On 5 February 2026, Jalali refused to celebrate a goal he scored against Shams Azar F.C. in solidarity with the 2025–2026 Iranian protests. On 9 February, he publicly objected to being included on a list of supporters of the 1979 Islamic Revolution by the Ministry of Sport and Youth, ahead of the Revolution's anniversary.

== Career statistics ==
=== Club ===
As of 6 November 2026

Club	Season	League			Hazfi Cup		ACL		Other		Total	
Club	Season	Division	Apps	Goals	Apps	Goals	Apps	Goals	Apps	Goals	Apps	Goals
Saipa	2018–19	Persian Gulf Pro League	14	0	1	0	0	0	—		15	0
Saipa	2019–20	Persian Gulf Pro League	21	0	2	0	—		—		23	0
Saipa	2020–21	Persian Gulf Pro League	23	1	0	0	—		—		23	1
Saipa	Total		58	1	3	0	0	0	–	–	61	1
Esteghlal	2021–22	Persian Gulf Pro League	10	0	2	0	—		—		12	0
Esteghlal	2022–23	Persian Gulf Pro League	15	1	3	0	—		—		18	1
Esteghlal	2023–24	Persian Gulf Pro League	29	1	1	0	0	0	—		30	1
Esteghlal	2024–25	Persian Gulf Pro League	23	1	4	0	7	0	—		34	1
Esteghlal	2025–26	Persian Gulf Pro League	10	1	1	0	4	0	1	0	16	1
Esteghlal	Total		87	4	11	0	11	0	1	0	110	4
Persepolis	2026–27	Persian Gulf Pro League	7	0	0	0	—		—		7	0
Persepolis	Total		7	0	0	0	0	0	0	0	7	0
Career total			152	5	14	0	11	0	1	0	178	5

=== International ===
As of match played 8 September 2025

Appearances and goals by national team and year
National team	Year	Apps	Goals
Iran	2021	1	0
Iran	2022	3	0
Iran	2024	2	0
Iran	2025	2	0
Total		8	0

== Honours ==
=== Esteghlal ===
- Persian Gulf Pro League: 2021–22
- Iranian Hazfi Cup : 2024–25
- Iranian Super Cup: 2022
