= Arthur Yamga =

French footballer (born 1996)

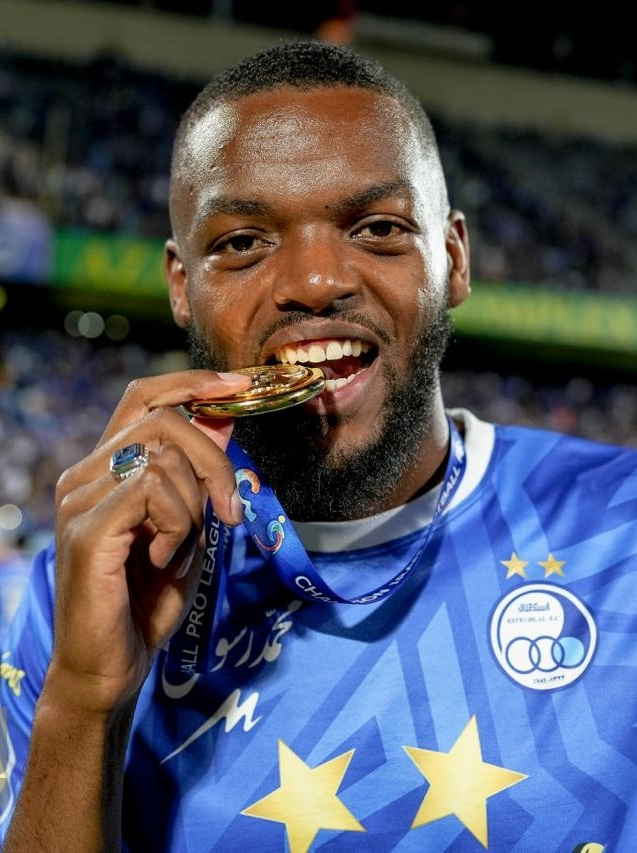
- Yamga with Esteghlal in May 2022

Personal information
- Full name: Arthur Kevin Yamga Tientcheu
- Date of birth: 7 September 1996 (age 30)
- Place of birth: Paris, France
- Height: 1.87 m (6 ft 2 in)
- Positions: Winger; right-back

Team information
- Current team: Cong An Ho Chi Minh City
- Number: 58

Youth career
- 2012–2015: Chievo Verona

Senior career*
Years	Team	Apps	(Gls)
2015–2019	Chievo Verona	0	(0)
2015–2016	→ Robur Siena (loan)	25	(4)
2016–2017	→ Arezzo (loan)	29	(3)
2017–2018	→ Carpi (loan)	2	(0)
2018	→ Pescara (loan)	4	(0)
2018–2019	→ Châteauroux (loan)	20	(1)
2019–2020	Desportivo das Aves	21	(1)
2020–2021	Vejle	27	(0)
2021–2024	Esteghlal	68	(21)
2024–2025	‌‌‌‌‌‌‌‌‌‌‌‌Nassaji	22	(5)
2025–2026	Maghreb Fez	6	(0)
2026–	Cong An Ho Chi Minh City	0	(0)
- * Club domestic league appearances and goals as of 30 January 2026

Arthur Kevin Yamga Tientcheu (born 7 September 1996) is a French professional footballer who plays as a right-back for V.League 1 club Cong An Ho Chi Minh City. He plays mainly as a right-back but also can play as a winger.

== Club career ==
=== ChievoVerona ===
==== Loan to Robur Siena ====
On 8 August 2015, Yamga signed a one-year loan with the Serie C side Robur Siena. On 6 September, Yamga made his professional debut in Serie C for Robur Siena in a 1–1 home draw against Carrarese, he was replaced by Gianmarco De Feo in the 78th minute. On 13 December, Yamga scored his first professional goal for Robur Siena in the 27th minute of a 3–0 away win over Savona. On 10 January 2016, Yamga played his first entire match for Robur Siena and he scored twice in a 2–0 away win over Ancona. On 31 January he scored his fourth goal in the third minute of a 1–0 away win against Prato. Yamga ended his loan to Robur Siena with 25 appearances, 4 goals and 1 assist.

==== Loan to Arezzo ====
On 1 July 2016, Yamga was signed by Serie C side Arezzo on a season-long loan deal. On 31 July, Yamga made his debut for Arezzo in the first round of Coppa Italia, he was replaced by Sergio Sabatini in the 79th minute of a 2–1 away win over Carrarese. On 7 August he played in the second round of Coppa Italia, he was replaced in the 78th minute of a 2–0 away defeat against Cesena. On 28 August, Yamga made his debut in Serie C for Arezzo, as a starter, playing the entire match and scoring his first goal for Arezzo in the 19th minute of a 2–2 home draw against Como. On 24 October he scored his second goal in the 64th minute of a 1–1 away draw against Livorno. On 8 April 2017, Yamga scored his third goal in the 35th minute of a 3–3 home draw against Giana Erminio. Yamga ended his loan to Arezzo with 31 appearances, 3 goals and 2 assists.

==== Loan to Carpi and Pescara ====
On 31 August 2017, Yamga signed a one-year loan with the Carpi. On 3 September, Yamga made his debut in Serie B for Carpi as a substitute replacing Jacopo Manconi in the 70th minute, but he was replaced by Riccardo Brosco, for an injury, in the 89th minute of a 1–0 away win over Spezia. On 24 October he played his second match for Carpi, again as a substitute, replacing Enej Jelenič in the 76th minute of a 3–1 home defeat against Palermo. On 29 November, Yamga played in the fourth round of Coppa Italia as a substitute replacing Davide Vitturini in the 86th minute of a 2–0 away defeat against Torino. In January 2018, Yamga was re-called to ChievoVerona leaving Carpi with only 3 appearances, all as a substitute.

On 23 January 2018, Yamga was signed by Serie B club Pescara on a six-month loan deal with an option to buy.

==== Loan to Châteauroux ====
On 3 September 2018, Yamga was loaned to Ligue 2 club LB Châteauroux.

=== Aves ===
On 22 July 2019, he signed a 3-year contract with the Portuguese club Desportivo das Aves.

=== Vejle BK ===
On 23 September 2020, Yamga joined newly promoted Danish Superliga club Vejle Boldklub on a deal until the summer 2022.

=== Esteghlal ===
After a season at Vejle, Yamga joined Iranian club Esteghlal on a free transfer, signing a two-year contract. He scored two goals on his debut against Zob Ahan. After a while in Esteghlal, he became the team's penalty taker.

=== Maghreb Fez ===
On 1 August 2025, Yamga joined Moroccan club Maghreb Fez on a free transfer, signing a two-year contract.

== Personal life ==
Yamga was born in France and is of Cameroonian descent.

== Career statistics ==
As of match played 30 January 2026

Appearances and goals by club, season and competition
Club	Season	League			National cup		Other		Total	
Club	Season	Division	Apps	Goals	Apps	Goals	Apps	Goals	Apps	Goals
Robur Siena	2015–16	Lega Pro	25	4	0	0	2	2	27	6
Arezzo	2016–17	Lega Pro	28	3	0	0	1	0	29	3
Carpi	2017–18	Serie B	2	0	0	0	—		2	0
Pescara	2017–18	Serie B	4	0	0	0	—		4	0
Châteauroux	2018–19	Ligue 2	20	1	1	0	—		21	1
Aves	2019–20	Primiera Liga	21	1	1	0	—		22	1
Vejle	2020–21	Danish Superliga	20	0	2	1	—		22	1
Vejle	2021–22	Danish Superliga	7	0	2	0	—		9	0
Vejle	Total		27	0	4	1	—		31	1
Esteghlal	2021–22	Persian Gulf Pro League	27	10	2	0	—		29	10
Esteghlal	2022–23	Persian Gulf Pro League	26	7	2	2	1 (Note: Appearance in Iranian Super Cup)	0	29	9
Esteghlal	2023–24	Persian Gulf Pro League	15	4	0	0	—		15	4
Esteghlal	Total		68	21	4	2	1	0	73	23
Nassaji	2024–25	Persian Gulf Pro League	22	5	3	1	—		25	6
Maghreb Fez	2025–26	Botola Pro	6	0	0	0	—		6	0
Cong An Ho Chi Minh City	2026–27	V.League 1	0	0	0	0	0	0	0	0
Career total			223	35	11	4	4	2	238	41

== Honours ==
ChievoVerona Primavera

- Campionato Nazionale Primavera: 2013–14

Esteghlal

- Persian Gulf Pro League: 2021–22
- Iranian Super Cup: 2022
- Iranian Hazfi Cup runner-up: 2022–23

Maghreb Fez

- Botola Pro: 2025–26
