= Hossein Hosseini (footballer, born 1992) =

Iranian footballer (born 1992)

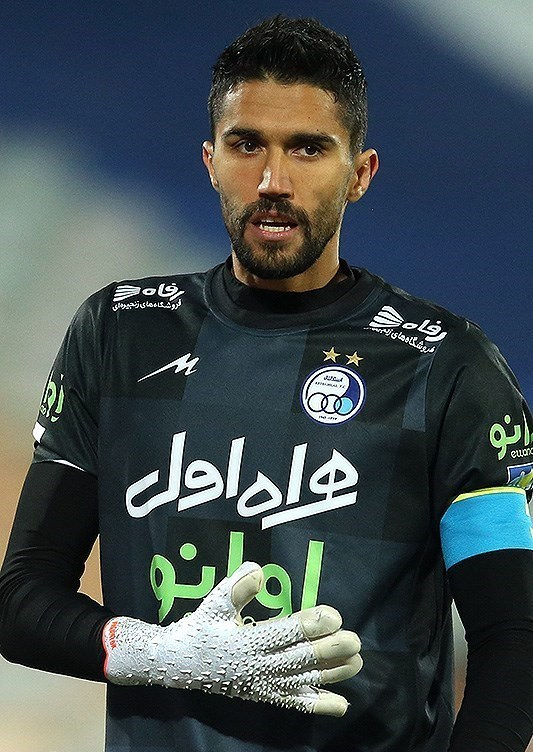
- Hosseini in 2021

Personal information
- Full name: Seyed Hossein Hosseini
- Date of birth: 30 June 1992 (age 34)
- Place of birth: Shiraz, Iran
- Height: 1.89 m (6 ft 2 in)
- Position: Goalkeeper

Team information
- Current team: Sepahan
- Number: 1

Youth career
- 2006–2012: Bargh Shiraz
- 2012–2013: Esteghlal

Senior career*
Years	Team	Apps	(Gls)
2011–2012	Bargh Shiraz	2	(0)
2012–2025	Esteghlal	189	(1)
2014–2016	→ Malavan (loan)	28	(0)
2025–	Sepahan	25	(0)

International career^{‡}
2007–2009	Iran U17	9	(0)
2010	Iran U20	2	(0)
2012–2015	Iran U23	4	(0)
2023	Iran U23 (O.P.)	5	(0)
2018–	Iran	14	(0)
- * Club domestic league appearances and goals as of 27 February 2026 ‡ National team caps and goals as of 29 September 2026

Seyed Hossein Hosseini (Persian: سید حسین حسینی; born 30 June 1992) is an Iranian professional footballer who plays as a goalkeeper for Persian Gulf Pro League club Sepahan and the Iran national team.

== Club career ==
=== 2010–2012: Early career and debut with Bargh Shiraz ===
Hosseini started his career with Bargh Shiraz. He mostly benched and made just two league appearances in two seasons.

=== Esteghlal ===
In the summer of 2012, Hosseini joined Esteghlal signing a three-year contract. Later in an interview with Navad, he revealed that he declined a huge offer from Persepolis to join the team he supported during his childhood. This claim was later confirmed by Mohammad Rouyanian who was Persepolis' chairman at the time.

On 9 July 2013, he made his debut in a friendly against Dynamo Kyiv in which he conceded a goal as Esteghlal beat their opponent 2–1. His first competitive appearance for Esteghlal was in Hazfi Cup against Caspian Qazvin on 10 December 2013.

==== 2014–16: Loan to Malavan ====
Hosseini joined Malavan in summer 2014 to complete his mandatory military service. He made his professional debut in 2014–15 Iran Pro League in 1–0 loss against Rah Ahan on 25 August 2014.

==== 2016–17: Return to Esteghlal ====
After finishing his mandatory service, Hosseini returned to Esteghlal as backup for Mehdi Rahmati. After Rahmati was sidelined for Esteghlal's opening match of the Persian Gulf Pro League season against Naft Tehran due to injury, Hosseini started the match and made his season debut. He finished the season with 8 matches.

==== 2017–18: Record Iranian top division league unbeaten streak ====
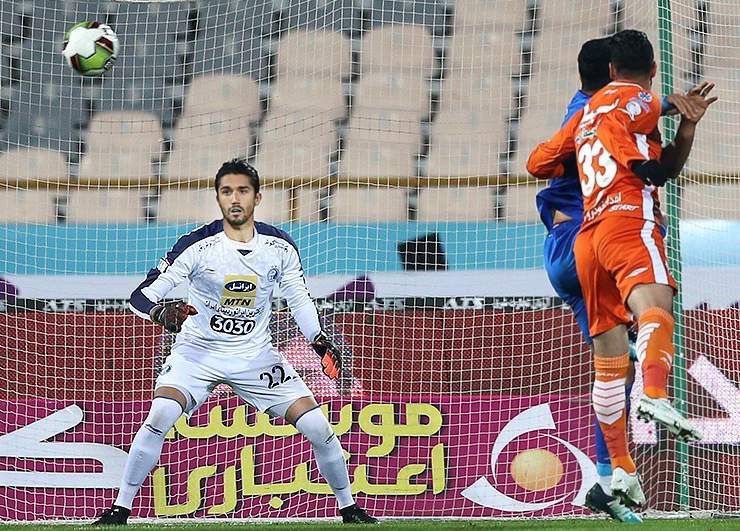
Hosseini in his record-breaking match against Saipa in January 2018

At the beginning of the season Mehdi Rahmati was the first choice keeper, however after failing to win four games out of the first five matches of the season, manager Alireza Mansourian decided to start Hosseini ahead of Rahmati. Hosseini made his season debut in the league on 15 September against Pars Jonoubi Jam in which he conceded 2 goals. He wore the captain's armband for the first time in the next game, on 20 September, in a league match against Zob Ahan. He kept his first clean sheet of the season in a 0–0 draw against Foolad. After keeping a clean sheet on 5 January 2018, he surpassed Alireza Beiranvand's record of 721 minutes without conceding a league goal in Persian Gulf Pro League in a 0–0 draw against Tractor Sazi. On 12 January, he surpassed the record for consecutive minutes in Iranian top division league set by Bahram Mavaddat in 1976 by 28 minutes against Saipa; he set the new all-time record at 872 consecutive minutes without conceding a goal. Reza Asadi finally ended his goalless streak by beating him in the 85th minute of the same match. His record is broken by Payam Niazmand in October 2019. His performance earned him Navad's 'Player of the Month' award at the end of January. On 24 February, Hosseini picked up a yellow card for time wasting in a match against Foolad, which ruled him out of the Tehran derby the following week.

In April 2024, Hosseini was suspended and fined by the Iranian federation for hugging a female fan.

During the 2024–25 AFC Champions League Elite round of 16 first leg tie against Saudi side Al Nassr at home, Hosseini pull a couple of saves during the match to denied a goal in a goalless draw which won him the 'Man of the Match' award.

== International career ==
Hosseini represented Iran U17 at the 2009 FIFA U-17 World Cup in Nigeria. He also represented Iran U20.

He was called to join Iran's training camp by Carlos Queiroz on 3 November 2017. However he did not make it into the final squad. On 17 March 2018, he made his official debut as a substitute for Hamed Lak at half-time against Sierra Leone, which Iran won 4–0 with Hosseini keeping a clean sheet. In May 2018 he was named in Iran's preliminary squad for the 2018 World Cup in Russia. He did not make the final 23.

Hosseini was called again to join the Iran national football team (Team Melli) by Dragan Skočić on 18 March 2022 for playing against South Korea and Lebanon on 24 and 29 March respectively .

In the 2022 FIFA World Cup during Iran's match against England, Hosseini was brought on as a concussion substitute after starting goalkeeper Alireza Beiranvand collided with a teammate, defender Majid Hosseini. This was the first use of a dedicated concussion substitute during a World Cup. Beiranvand had also broken his nose. The match ended with Iran scoring 2 goals and conceding 6.

On 1 June 2026, he was named in the 26-man squad for the 2026 FIFA World Cup.

== Personal life ==
Hosseini got married in May 2017. He named Manuel Neuer and Mehdi Rahmati as his role models. Since childhood, he has supported Esteghlal.

On 8 January 2026, Hosseini publicly supported the 2025–2026 Iranian protests on his Instagram, stating: "This is not called (economic) 'conditions', this is called injustice against the people."

== Career statistics ==
=== Club ===
As of 27 February 2026

Club	Season	League			Hazfi Cup		ACL		Other		Total	
Club	Season	League	Apps	Goals	Apps	Goals	Apps	Goals	Apps	Goals	Apps	Goals
Bargh Shiraz	2011–12	Division 1	2	0	0	0	—		—		2	0
Esteghlal	2012–13	Pro League	0	0	0	0	0	0	—		0	0
Esteghlal	2013–14	Pro League	0	0	1	0	1	0	—		2	0
Esteghlal	2016–17	Pro League	8	0	0	0	0	0	—		8	0
Esteghlal	2017–18	Pro League	20	0	1	0	4	0	—		25	0
Esteghlal	2018–19	Pro League	13	0	1	0	5	0	—		19	0
Esteghlal	2019–20	Pro League	30	0	5	0	7	0	—		42	0
Esteghlal	2020–21	Pro League	11	0	3	0	1	0	—		15	0
Esteghlal	2021–22	Pro League	26	0	0	0	—		—		26	0
Esteghlal	2022–23	Pro League	25	1	5	0	—		1	0	31	1
Esteghlal	2023–24	Pro League	29	0	1	0	—		—		30	0
Esteghlal	2024–25	Pro League	27	0	5	0	10	0	-		42	0
Esteghlal	Total		189	1	22	0	28	0	1	0	240	1
Malavan (loan)	2014–15	Pro League	13	0	0	0	—		—		13	0
Malavan (loan)	2015–16	Pro League	15	0	0	0	—		—		15	0
Malavan (loan)	Total		28	0	0	0	—		—		28	0
Sepahan	2025–26	Pro League	15	0	2	0	6	0	—		23	0
Career Totals			234	1	24	0	34	0	1	0	293	1

=== International ===
As of 29 September 2026

Iran
Year	Apps	Goals
2018	4	0
2022	4	0
2023	1	0
2024	2	0
2025	1	0
2026	2	0
Total	14	0

== Honours ==
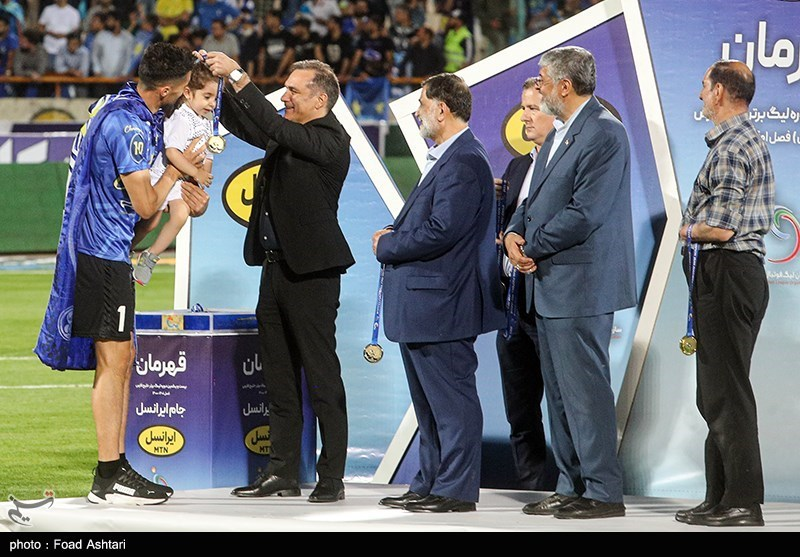
Hosseini receiving 2021–22 Iran Pro League championship medal

Esteghlal

- Persian Gulf Pro League: 2012–13, 2021–22
- Hazfi Cup: 2017–18, 2024–25
- Iranian Super Cup: 2022

Individual

- Persian Gulf Pro League: 2021–22 Golden Glove
