= Reza Mirzaei =

Iranian association footballer

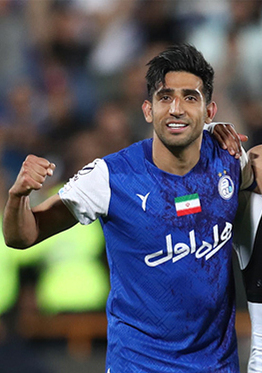

Personal information
- Date of birth: 14 April 1996 (age 30)
- Place of birth: Isfahan, Iran
- Height: 1.77 m (5 ft 10 in)
- Positions: Winger; right-back

Team information
- Current team: Chadormalou
- Number: 77

Youth career
- Sepahan

Senior career*
Years	Team	Apps	(Gls)
2015–2022	Sepahan	92	(8)
2018–2019	→ Foolad (loan)	28	(1)
2022–2024	Esteghlal	20	(1)
2024–2025	Malavan	15	(0)
2025–	Chadormalou	31	(1)

International career
2013–2015	Iran U20	7	(1)
- * Club domestic league appearances and goals as of 18 April 2025

Reza Mirzaei (Persian: رضا میرزایی; born 14 April 1996) is an Iranian professional footballer who plays as a winger or right-back for Chadormalou in the Persian Gulf Pro League.

== Career statistics ==
- Last Update:18 May 2023

Club performance			League		Cup		Continental		Other		Total	
Club	Season	League	Apps	Goals	Apps	Goals	Apps	Goals	Apps	Goals	Apps	Goals
Sepahan	2015–16	Pro League	3	0	0	0	1	0	0	0	4	0
Sepahan	2016–17	Pro League	19	2	1	0	0	0	0	0	20	2
Sepahan	2017–18	Pro League	20	1	0	0	0	0	0	0	20	1
Sepahan	Total		42	3	1	0	1	0	0	0	44	3
Foolad (loan)	2018–19	Pro League	28	1	1	0	0	0	0	0	29	1
Sepahan	2019–20	Pro League	16	2	2	0	5	1	0	0	23	5
Sepahan	2020–21	Pro League	15	2	3	0	0	0	0	0	18	2
Sepahan	2021–22	Pro League	17	1	0	0	5	0	0	0	22	1
Sepahan	Total		48	5	5	0	10	1	0	0	63	6
Esteghlal	2022–23	Pro League	20	1	2	0	0	0	1	0	23	1
Career Total			138	10	9	0	11	1	1	0	159	11

== Honours ==
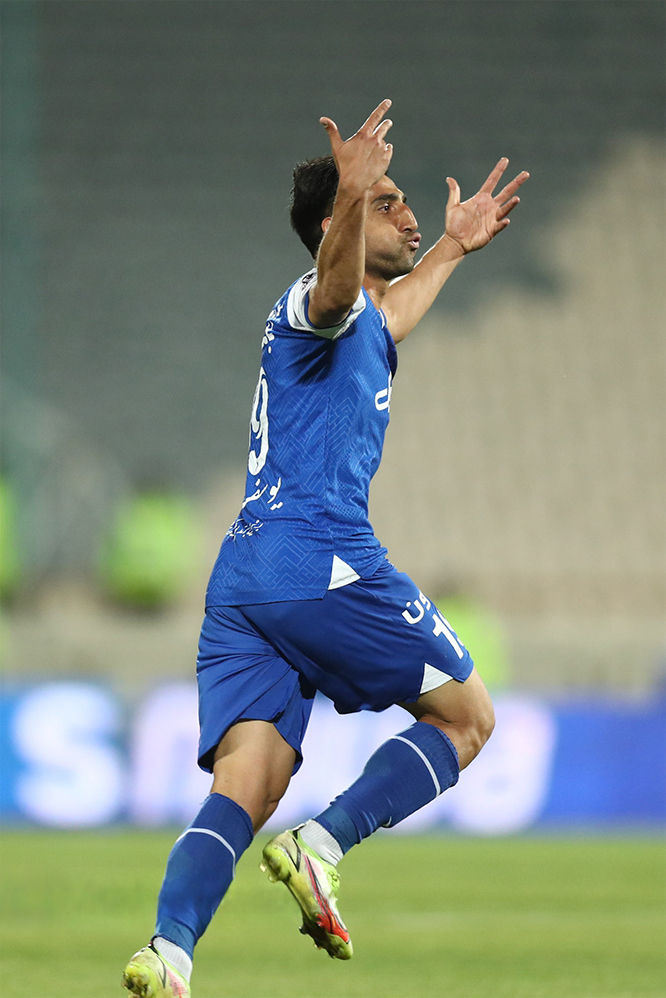

Sepahan

- Persian Gulf Pro League (1) : 2014–15 ، runner-up 2020–21, 2023–24

Esteghlal

- Iranian Super Cup (1) : 2022
