= Jafar Salmani =

Iranian association football player

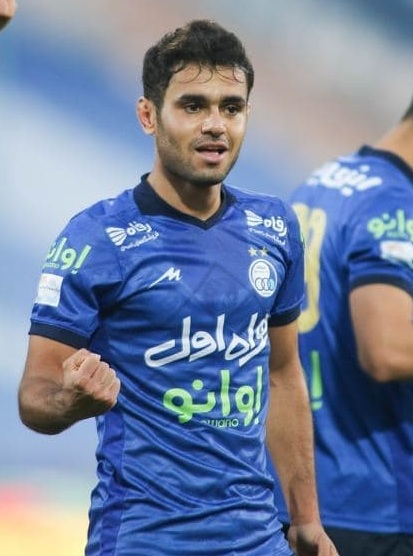

Personal information
- Date of birth: 12 January 1997 (age 29)
- Place of birth: Shadegan, Iran
- Height: 1.75 m (5 ft 9 in)
- Positions: Left winger; left-back

Team information
- Current team: Al-Talaba
- Number: 20

Youth career
- 2015–2017: Sanat Naft

Senior career*
Years	Team	Apps	(Gls)
2017–2021	Sanat Naft	54	(3)
2021	Portimonense	11	(1)
2021–2024	Esteghlal	82	(6)
2025–2026	Malavan	18	(0)
2026–	Al-Talaba	12	(2)

International career^{‡}
2018–2020	Iran U23	4	(0)
2021–	Iran	4	(0)
- * Club domestic league appearances and goals as of 15 November 2025 ‡ National team caps and goals as of 17 November 2026

Jafar Salmani (Persian: جعفر سلمانی; born 12 January 1997) is an Iranian professional footballer who plays as a left winger for Iraqi Stars League club Al-Talaba.

== Club career ==
=== Sanat Naft ===
He made his debut for Sanat Naft Abadan in 25th fixtures of 2017–18 Iran Pro League against Siah Jamegan.

=== Portimonense ===
On 20 December 2020, Salmani signed a 2.5-year contract with Portuguese club Portimonense, where he was reunited with Paulo Sérgio, his former coach at Sanat Naft.

== International career ==
He made his debut on 30 March 2021 against Syria.

== Career statistics ==
=== Club ===
As of 1 June 2024

Appearances and goals by club, season and competition
Club	Season	League			National Cup		League Cup		Total	
Club	Season	Division	Apps	Goals	Apps	Goals	Apps	Goals	Apps	Goals
Sanat Naft	2017–18	Persian Gulf Pro League	2	0	0	0	—		2	0
Sanat Naft	2018–19	Persian Gulf Pro League	23	2	2	2	—		25	4
Sanat Naft	2019–20	Persian Gulf Pro League	29	1	1	0	—		30	1
Sanat Naft	2020–21	Persian Gulf Pro League	0	0	—		—		0	0
Sanat Naft	Total		54	3	3	2	—		57	5
Portimonense	2020–21	Primeira Liga	11	1	—		—		11	1
Portimonense	2021–22	Primeira Liga	0	0	—		2	0	2	0
Portimonense	Total		11	1	0	0	2	0	13	1
Esteghlal	2021–22	Persian Gulf Pro League	30	4	2	0	—		32	4
Esteghlal	2023–24	Persian Gulf Pro League	29	2	4	0	–		33	2
Esteghlal	2023–24	Persian Gulf Pro League	23	0	1	0	–		24	0
Esteghlal	total		82	6	7	0	0	0	89	6
Career total			147	10	10	2	2	0	159	12

=== International ===
Statistics accurate as of match played 17 November 2026

Appearances and goals by national team, year, and competition
Team	Year	Competitive		Friendly		Total	
Team	Year	Apps	Goals	Apps	Goals	Apps	Goals
Iran U23	2018	0	0	0	0	0	0
Iran U23	2019	—		1	0	1	0
Iran U23	2020	3	0	—		3	0
Iran U23	Total	3	0	1	0	4	0
Iran	2021	1	0	1	0	2	0
Iran	2026	0	0	2	0	2	0
Career total		4	0	4	0	8	0

== Honours ==
=== Esteghlal ===
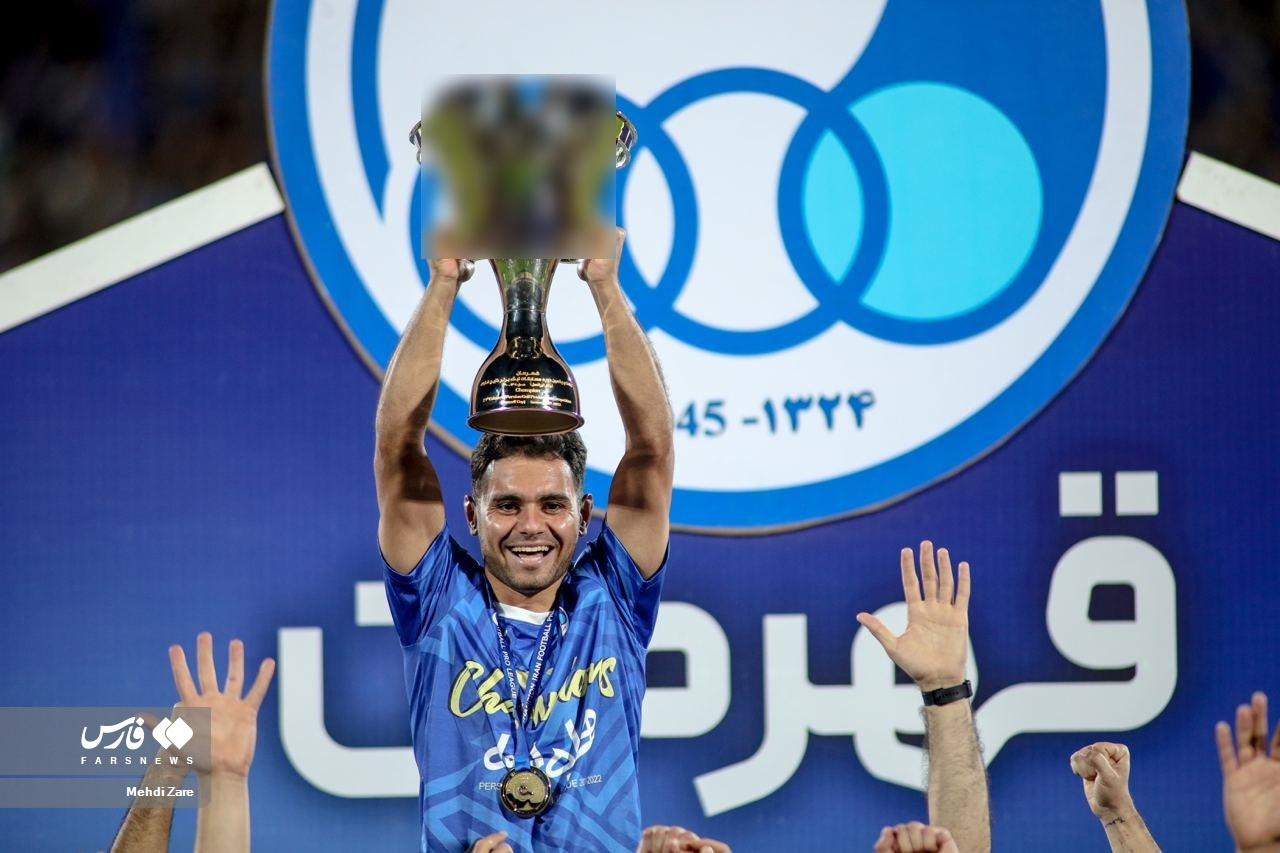
Salmani with 2021–22 Persian Gulf Pro League championship trophy

- Persian Gulf Pro League: 2021–22
- Iranian Super Cup: 2022
