= Amirali Sadeghi =

Iranian footballer

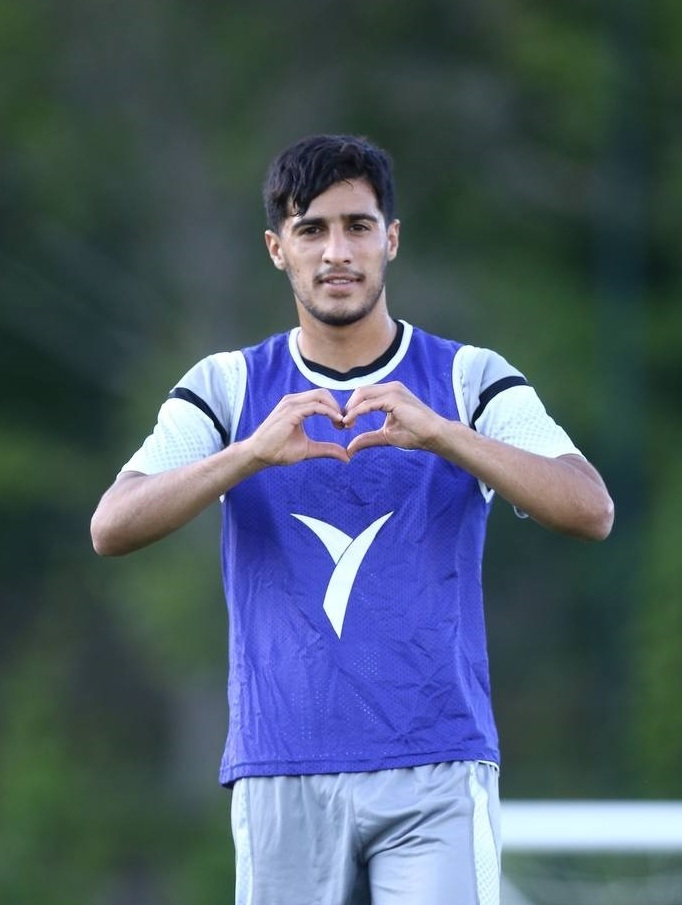
- Sadeghi in 2022

Personal information
- Date of birth: 9 February 2001 (age 25)
- Place of birth: Tehran, Iran
- Height: 1.73 m (5 ft 8 in)
- Position: Midfielder

Team information
- Current team: Aluminium Arak
- Number: 7

Youth career
- 2015–2018: Naft Tehran
- 2018–2019: Saipa

Senior career*
Years	Team	Apps	(Gls)
2019–2021	Saipa	23	(2)
2021–2025	Esteghlal	24	(1)
2025–2026	Esteghlal Khuzestan	8	(0)
2026–	Aluminium Arak	10	(0)

International career^{‡}
2021–	Iran U23	4	(0)
2022	Iran	1	(0)
- * Club domestic league appearances and goals as of 2 May 2025 ‡ National team caps and goals as of 11 November 2022

Amirali Sadeghi (Persian: امیرعلی صادقی; born 9 February 2001) is an Iranian footballer who plays as a midfielder for Aluminium Arak in the Persian Gulf Pro League.

== Club career ==
Sadeghi made his debut for Saipa in 12th fixture of 2019–20 Persian Gulf Pro League against Machine Sazi while he substituted in for Amir Hossein Hosseinzadeh.

== Career statistics ==
=== Club ===
As of 24 May 2025

Appearances and goals by club, season and competition
Club	Season	League			National Cup		Continental		Other		Total	
Club	Season	Division	Apps	Goals	Apps	Goals	Apps	Goals	Apps	Goals	Apps	Goals
Saipa	2019–20	Persian Gulf Pro League	7	0	0	0	—		—		7	0
Saipa	2020–21	Persian Gulf Pro League	16	2	0	0	—		—		16	2
Saipa	Total		23	2	0	0	—		—		23	2
Esteghlal	2021–22	Persian Gulf Pro League	9	0	1	0	—		—		10	0
Esteghlal	2022–23	Persian Gulf Pro League	5	0	0	0	—		—		5	0
Esteghlal	2023–24	Persian Gulf Pro League	1	0	0	0	—		—		1	0
Esteghlal	2024–25	Persian Gulf Pro League	9	1	2	0	2	0	—		13	1
Esteghlal	Total		24	1	3	0	2	0	—		29	1
Career total			47	3	3	0	2	0	—		52	3

== Honours ==
=== Esteghlal ===
- Iran Pro League: 2021–22
- Iranian Hazfi Cup: 2024–25
- Iranian Super Cup: 2022
