= Nima Entezari =

Iranian footballer (born 1996)

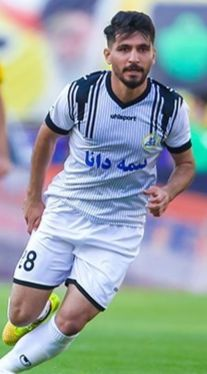

Personal information
- Date of birth: 18 July 1996 (age 30)
- Place of birth: Babol, Iran
- Height: 1.78 m (5 ft 10 in)
- Position: Midfielder

Team information
- Current team: Zob Ahan
- Number: 28

Youth career
- 2015–2017: Khoneh Be Khoneh

Senior career*
Years	Team	Apps	(Gls)
2017–2018	Khoneh Be Khoneh	4	(0)
2018–2020	Pars Jonoubi Jam	28	(2)
2020–2021	Naft MIS	26	(1)
2021–2023	Havadar	51	(1)
2023–2025	Mes Rafsanjan	12	(0)
2024–2025	→ Malavan (loan)	27	(2)
2025–2026	Paykan	11	(0)
2026–	Zob Ahan	11	(0)
- * Club domestic league appearances and goals as of 18 April 2025

Nima Entezari (Persian: نیما انتظاری, born 18 July 1996) is an Iranian footballer who plays as a midfielder for Zob Ahan in the Persian Gulf Pro League.

== Club career ==
=== Pars Jonoubi Jam ===
He made his debut for Pars Jonoubi Jam in the fixtures of 2018–19 Iran Pro League against Machine Sazi.

== Career statistics ==
=== Club career ===
Appearances and goals by club, season and competition
Club	Season	League			Hazfi cup		Total	
Club	Season	Division	Apps	Goals	Apps	Goals	Apps	Goals
Khooneh be Khooneh	2017–18	Azadegan League	1	0	1	0	2	0
Khooneh be Khooneh	Total		1	0	1	0	2	0
Pars Jonoubi Jam	2018–19	Persian Gulf Pro League	13	0	1	0	14	0
Pars Jonoubi Jam	2019–20	Persian Gulf Pro League	15	2	1	0	16	2
Naft Masjed Soleyman	2020–21	Persian Gulf Pro League	26	1	1	0	27	1
Havadar	2021–22	Persian Gulf Pro League	25	1	—		25	1
Havadar	2022–23	Persian Gulf Pro League	26	0	4	0	30	0
Havadar	Total		105	4	7	0	112	4
Career total			106	4	8	0	114	4
