= Amir Hossein Sedghi =

Iranian footballer (born 1996)

Amirhossein Sedghi
Personal information
- Date of birth: 29 January 1996 (age 30)
- Place of birth: Mashhad, Iran
- Height: 1.78 m (5 ft 10 in)
- Position: Right back

Team information
- Current team: Paykan
- Number: 28

Youth career
- Mashhad

Senior career*
Years	Team	Apps	(Gls)
2014–2016	Mashhad	9	(0)
2016–2019	Baadraan	24	(0)
2019–2021	Fajr Sepasi	50	(2)
2021–2023	Zob Ahan	42	(0)
2023–2024	Paykan	24	(1)
2024–2025	Shams Azar	10	(0)
2025–	Paykan	8	(0)
- * Club domestic league appearances and goals as of 16 April 2025

Amirhossein Sedghi (Persian: امیرحسین صدقی; born 29 January 1996) is an Iranian football defender who plays for Paykan in the Azadegan League.

== Club career ==
Sedghi started his career with Siah Jamegan from youth levels. He made his professional debut for Siah Jamegan on August 13, 2015, in 1–0 win against Naft Tehran as a starter.

== Club career statistics ==
As of 15 September 2021.

Club	Division	Season	League		Hazfi Cup		Asia		Total	
Club	Division	Season	Apps	Goals	Apps	Goals	Apps	Goals	Apps	Goals
Siah Jamegan	Division 1	2014–15	1	0	0	0	–	–	1	0
Siah Jamegan	Pro League	2015–16	9	0	0	0	–	–	9	0
Baadran	Division 1	2016–17	2	0	1	0	–	–	3	0
Baadran	Division 1	2017–18	4	0	0	0	–	–	4	0
Baadran	Division 1	2018–19	17	0	0	0	–	–	17	0
Fajr Sepasi	Division 1	2019–20	8	0	1	0	–	–	9	0
Fajr Sepasi	Division 1	2020–21	26	1	0	0	–	–	26	1
Zob Ahan	Pro League	2021–22	14	0	2	0	–	–	16	0
Career totals			5	0	0	0	0	0	5	0
