= Mohammad Hosseini (footballer, born 1995) =

Iranian footballer

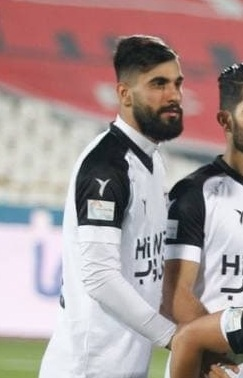

Personal information
- Full name: Seyed Mohammad Hosseini
- Date of birth: 8 January 1995 (age 31)
- Place of birth: Dogonbadan, Iran
- Height: 1.82 m (6 ft 0 in)
- Position: Defender

Team information
- Current team: Zob Ahan
- Number: 5

Youth career
- –2013: Naft va Gaz Gachsaran
- 2013–2015: Fajr Sepasi

Senior career*
Years	Team	Apps	(Gls)
2015–2018	Fajr Sepasi	58	(1)
2018–2019	Naft Masjed Soleyman	19	(0)
2019–2020	Sorkhpooshan Pakdasht	7	(0)
2020	Esteghlal Khuzestan	14	(0)
2020–2021	Machine Sazi	26	(0)
2021–2022	Havadar	24	(2)
2022	Esteghlal	0	(0)
2022–2024	Tractor	27	(0)
2024–2025	Esteghlal Khuzestan	23	(0)
2025–	Zob Ahan	10	(0)
- * Club domestic league appearances and goals as of 30 October 2024

Seyed Mohammad Hosseini (Persian: سید محمد حسینی; born 8 January 1995) is an Iranian football defender who plays for Zob Ahan in the Persian Gulf Pro League.

== Club career ==
=== Naft Masjed Soleyman ===
He made his debut for Naft Masjed Soleyman in 8th fixtures of 2018–19 Persian Gulf Pro League against Sepahan.

== Career statistics ==
=== Club ===
Club	Season	League			Cup		Continental		Total	
Club	Season	League	Apps	Goals	Apps	Goals	Apps	Goals	Apps	Goals
Fajr	2014-15	Azadegan League	6	0	0	0	0	0	6	0
Fajr	2015-16	Azadegan League	21	0	0	0	0	0	21	0
Fajr	2016-17	Azadegan League	8	0	0	0	0	0	8	0
Fajr	2017-18	Azadegan League	23	1	2	0	0	0	25	1
Fajr	Total		58	1	2	0	0	0	60	1
Naft MIS	2018-19	Persian Gulf Pro League	19	0	1	0	0	0	20	0
Havadar	2019-20	Azadegan League	6	0	0	0	0	0	6	0
Esteghlal Kh	2019-20	Azadegan League	10	0	0	0	0	0	10	0
Machine Sazi	2020-21	Persian Gulf Pro League	26	0	1	0	0	0	27	0
Havadar	2021-22	Persian Gulf Pro League	24	2	0	0	0	0	24	2
Tractor	2022-23	Persian Gulf Pro League	18	0	1	0	0	0	19	0
Tractor	2023-24	Persian Gulf Pro League	7	0	1	0	0	0	8	0
Tractor	Total		25	0	2	0	0	0	27	0
Career Total			168	3	6	0	0	0	174	3
