= Alireza Rezaei (footballer) =

Iranian footballer (born 1999)

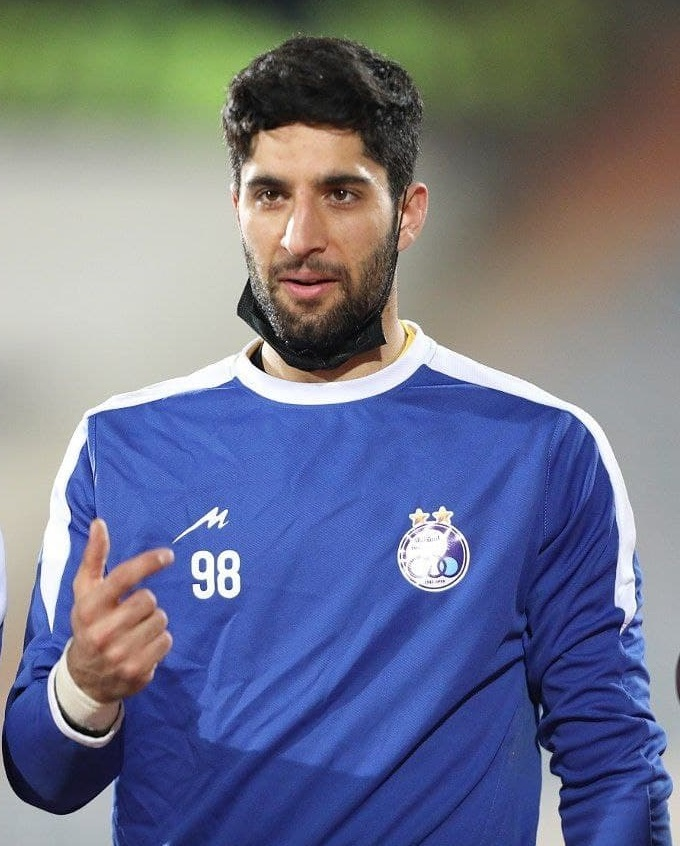
- Rezaei in 2022

Personal information
- Date of birth: 11 December 1999 (age 26)
- Place of birth: Qazvin, Iran
- Height: 1.93 m (6 ft 4 in)
- Position: Goalkeeper

Team information
- Current team: Nassaji
- Number: 98

Youth career
- 2017–2019: Paykan

Senior career*
Years	Team	Apps	(Gls)
2018–2021	Paykan	16	(0)
2021–2023	Esteghlal	8	(0)
2024–	Nassaji	9	(0)

International career^{‡}
2021	Iran U23	2	(0)
- * Club domestic league appearances and goals as of 17 April 2025 ‡ National team caps and goals as of 28 October 2021

Alireza Rezaei (Persian: علیرضا رضایی; born 11 December 1999) is an Iranian footballer who plays for Nassaji in the Persian Gulf Pro League.

== Club career ==
=== Paykan ===
He made his debut for Paykan in first fixture of 2020–21 Persian Gulf Pro League against Sanat Naft.

=== Esteghlal ===
He made his debut for Esteghlal against Nassaji. He was the goalkeeper for three consecutive matches and only conceded 1 goal against Sanat Naft. He was the goalkeeper for 2 Hazfi Cup matches, in which he conceded 1 goal only.

== Honours ==
=== Esteghlal ===
- Iran Pro League: 2021–22
- Iranian Super Cup: 2022
