= Farhad Kermanshahi =

Iranian footballer (born 1996)

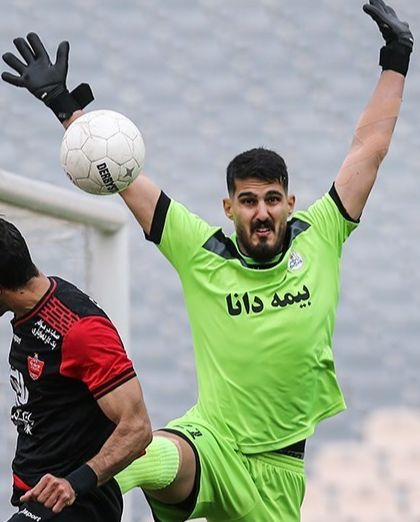

Personal information
- Full name: Farhad Majd Kermanshahi
- Date of birth: 29 September 1996 (age 30)
- Place of birth: Tabriz, Iran
- Height: 1.95 m (6 ft 5 in)
- Position: Goalkeeper

Team information
- Current team: Oghab Tehran
- Number: 21

Youth career
- –2016: Shahrdari Tabriz

Senior career*
Years	Team	Apps	(Gls)
2016–2018	Shahrdari Tabriz	3	(0)
2018–2019	Gol Gohar	1	(0)
2019–2020	Mes Kerman	0	(0)
2020–2021	Naft Masjed Soleyman	19	(0)
2021–2023	Paykan	29	(0)
2023	Naft Masjed Soleyman	6	(0)
2024–	Oghab Tehran		
- * Club domestic league appearances and goals as of 18 May 2023

Farhad Majd Kermanshahi (Persian: فرهاد مجدکرمانشاهی; born 29 September 1996) is an Iranian footballer who plays as a goalkeeper for Oghab Tehran in the League 2.

== Club career ==
=== Paykan ===
He made his debut for Paykan in first fixtures of 2021–22 Persian Gulf Pro League against Naft Masjed Soleyman.
