= Ayoub Kalantari =

Iranian footballer

Ayub Kalantari
Personal information
- Full name: Ayub Kalantari
- Date of birth: 27 November 1990 (age 35)
- Place of birth: shiraz, Iran
- Height: 1.83 m (6 ft 0 in)
- Position: Defensive midfielder

Team information
- Current team: F.C. Nassaji Mazandaran
- Number: 8

Youth career
- 2005–2007: Persepolis
- 2007–2010: Fajr Sepasi

Senior career*
Years	Team	Apps	(Gls)
2010–2012	Fajr Sepasi	44	(4)
2012–2014	Foolad	51	(4)
2014–2015	Saba Qom	23	(5)
2015	Gostaresh Foolad	6	(0)
2015–2016	Tractor	12	(1)
2016–2017	Siah Jamegan	14	(3)
2017–2018	Saipa	15	(1)
2018–2019	Esteghlal Khuzestan	27	(3)
2019–2020	Fajr Sepasi	31	(2)
2020–2023	Nassaji	90	(12)
2023-2024	Havadar	6	(0)
2024-	F.C. Nassaji Mazandaran	10	(0)
- * Club domestic league appearances and goals as of 29 September 2024 @ 11:35(AEST)

Ayub Kalantari (Persian: ایوب کلانتری; born 1990) is an Iranian footballer, who plays for Nassaji in the Persian Gulf Pro League.

== Club career ==
Kalantari joined Foolad in summer 2012, after spending previous two season in Fajr Sepasi.

After one season with Saba Qom, he joined newly promoted side Siah Jamegan in the summer of 2015.

=== Statistics ===
As of 15 May 2018

Club performance			League		Cup		Continental		Other		Total	
Season	Club	League	Apps	Goals	Apps	Goals	Apps	Goals	Apps	Goals	Apps	Goals
Iran			League		Hazfi Cup		Asia		Iranian Super Cup		Total	
2010–11	Fajr Sepasi	Division 1	14	1	0	0	–		0	0	14	1
2011–12	Fajr Sepasi	Pro League	30	3	0	0	–		0	0	30	3
Total			44	4	0	0	0	0	0	0	44	4
2012–13	Foolad	Persian Gulf Pro League	22	4	0	0	–		0	0	22	4
2013–14	Foolad	Persian Gulf Pro League	29	0	2	0	5	0	0	0	36	0
Total			51	4	2	0	5	0	0	0	58	4
2014–15	Saba Qom	Iran Pro League	23	5	1	0	–	–	0	0	24	5
2015	Gostaresh	Iran Pro League	6	0	0	0	–	–	0	0	6	0
2015–16	Tractor	Iran Pro League	12	1	0	0	–	–	0	0	12	1
2016–17	Siah Jamegan	Iran Pro League	14	3	0	0	–	–	0	0	14	3
2017–18	Saipa	Iran Pro League	6	0	0	0	–	–	0	0	6	0
2018–19	Esteghlal Khuzestan	Iran Pro League	27	3	2	1	–	–	0	0	29	4
2019-20	Fajr	Azadegan League	11	1	2	0	0	0	0	0	13	1
2020-21	Nassaji	Persian Gulf Pro League	28	3	2	0	0	0	0	0	30	2
2021-22	Nassaji	Persian Gulf Pro League	25	4	4	0	0	0	0	0	29	4
2022-23	Nassaji	Persian Gulf Pro League	26	5	4	0	0	0	1	0	31	5
Total			79	12	10	0	0	0	1	0	90	12
2023-24	Havadar	Iran Pro League	6	0	0	0	0	0	0	0	6	0
Career total			269	33	19	1	5	0	1	0	294	34

== Honours ==
Foolad

- Iran Pro League (1): 2013–14
