= Saber Hardani =

Iranian footballer

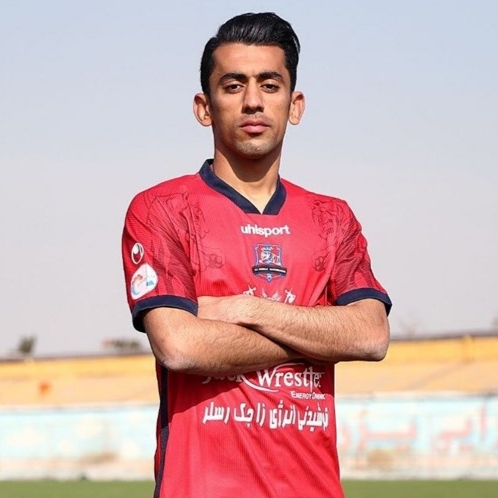

Personal information
- Full name: Saber Hardani Kherad
- Date of birth: 27 October 1996 (age 30)
- Place of birth: Dishmook, Iran
- Height: 1.73 m (5 ft 8 in)
- Positions: Winger; right back

Team information
- Current team: Shams Azar

Youth career
- 2013–2016: Foolad

Senior career*
Years	Team	Apps	(Gls)
2014–2016	Foolad B	29	(8)
2016–2022	Foolad	84	(3)
2022–2025	Nassaji Mazandaran	75	(0)
2025–2026	Paykan	1	(0)
2026–	Shams Azar	0	(0)
- * Club domestic league appearances and goals as of 1 May 2022

Saber Hardani (Persian: صابر حردانی; born 27 October 1996) is an Iranian professional footballer who plays as a winger for Shams Azar in the Persian Gulf Pro League.

== Club career ==
Hardani started his career with Foolad's youth team, Foolad Khuzestan B F.C. In the winter of 2016 he joined the first team by Naeim Saadavi and signed a three-and-a-half-year contract which will keep him with the club until 2018. Hardani made his debut on 5 August 2016 against Zob Ahan CSC, as a substitute for Ayoub Vali.

== Honours ==
Foolad

- Hazfi Cup: 2020–21
- Iranian Super Cup: 2021

Nassaji

- Hazfi Cup: 2021–22

== Career statistics ==
=== Club ===
As of 20 August 2023

Club	Season	League			Hazfi Cup		ACL		Other		Total	
Club	Season	League	Apps	Goals	Apps	Goals	Apps	Goals	Apps	Goals	Apps	Goals
Foolad	2016-17	Persian Gulf Pro League	4	0	0	0	0	0	0	0	4	0
Foolad	2017-18	Persian Gulf Pro League	14	2	0	0	0	0	0	0	14	2
Foolad	2018-19	Persian Gulf Pro League	14	0	1	1	0	0	0	0	15	1
Foolad	2019-20	Persian Gulf Pro League	24	1	0	0	0	0	0	0	24	1
Foolad	2020-21	Persian Gulf Pro League	10	0	2	0	5	0	0	0	17	0
Foolad	2021-22	Persian Gulf Pro League	12	0	2	0	0	0	0	0	14	0
Foolad	Total		78	3	5	1	5	0	0	0	88	4
Nassaji	2021-22	Persian Gulf Pro League	12	0	3	0	0	0	0	0	15	0
Nassaji	2022-23	Persian Gulf Pro League	24	0	2	1	0	0	1	0	27	1
Nassaji	2023-24	Persian Gulf Pro League	20	0	0	0	4	0	0	0	24	0
Nassaji	Total		56	0	5	1	4	0	1	0	66	1
Career Total			121	3	10	2	8	0	1	0	140	5
