= 2022 Iranian Super Cup =

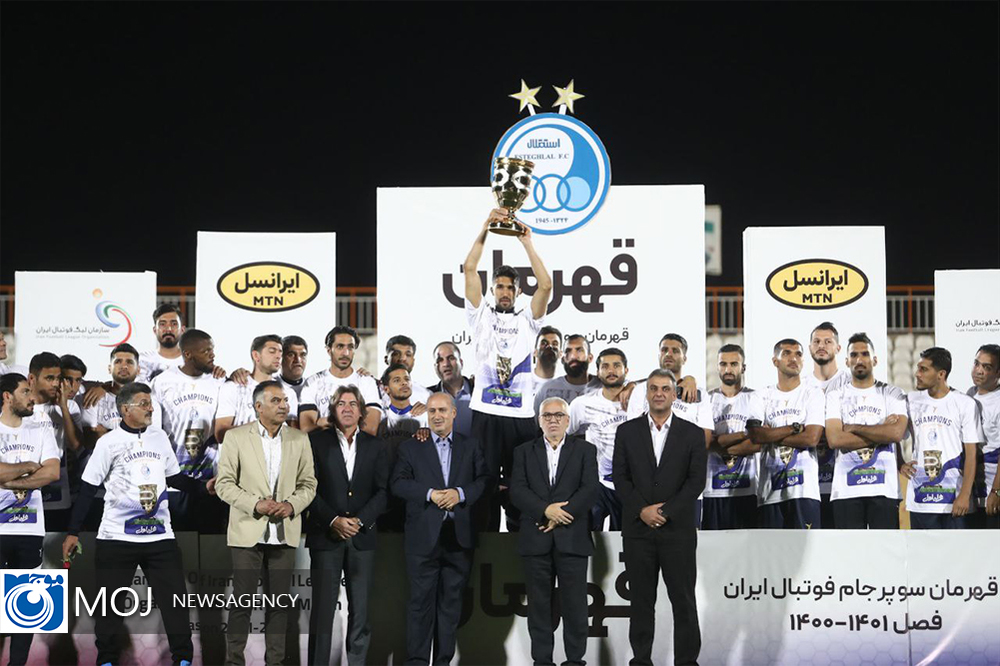
- The champion team didnt any joy because of the unrest and Anti regime and liberal protests in Iran
Esteghlal	Nassaji
Persian Gulf Pro League	Hazfi Cup
1	0
- Date: 2 November 2022
- Venue: Bahonar, Kerman
- Referee: Bijan Heydari
- Weather: Hurricane

The 2022 Iranian Super Cup was the 8th Iranian Super Cup, an annual football match played between the winners of the previous season's Persian Gulf Pro League, Esteghlal, and the previous season's Hazfi Cup, Nassaji. It was played on 2 November 2022 at the Shahid Bahonar Stadium, Kerman.

Esteghlal Tehran defeated Nassaji 1–0 to win their first title.

== Teams ==
Team	Title	Previous appearances (bold indicates winners)
Esteghlal	2021–22 Persian Gulf Pro League champions	1 (2018)
Nassaji	2021–22 Hazfi Cup champions	None

== Match ==
=== Details ===
2 November 2022
16:00 IRST +03:30

Esteghlal	1–0	Nassaji
Arsalan Motahari 51'	Report

Shahid bahonar, Kerman
Referee: Bijan Heydari

Referee:
(Iran) Bijan Heydari
Assistant Referees:
(Iran) Mohammadreza Mansouri
(Iran) Askar Mohammadi
Fourth official:
(Iran) Morteza Mansourian

Match rules:

- 90 minutes
- 30 minutes of extra-time if necessary
- Penalty shoot-out if scores still level
- Eleven named substitutes
- Maximum of five substitutions in normal time and another substitution in extra time
