= 2021–22 Persian Gulf Pro League =

21st season of Persian Gulf Pro League

Persian Gulf Pro League
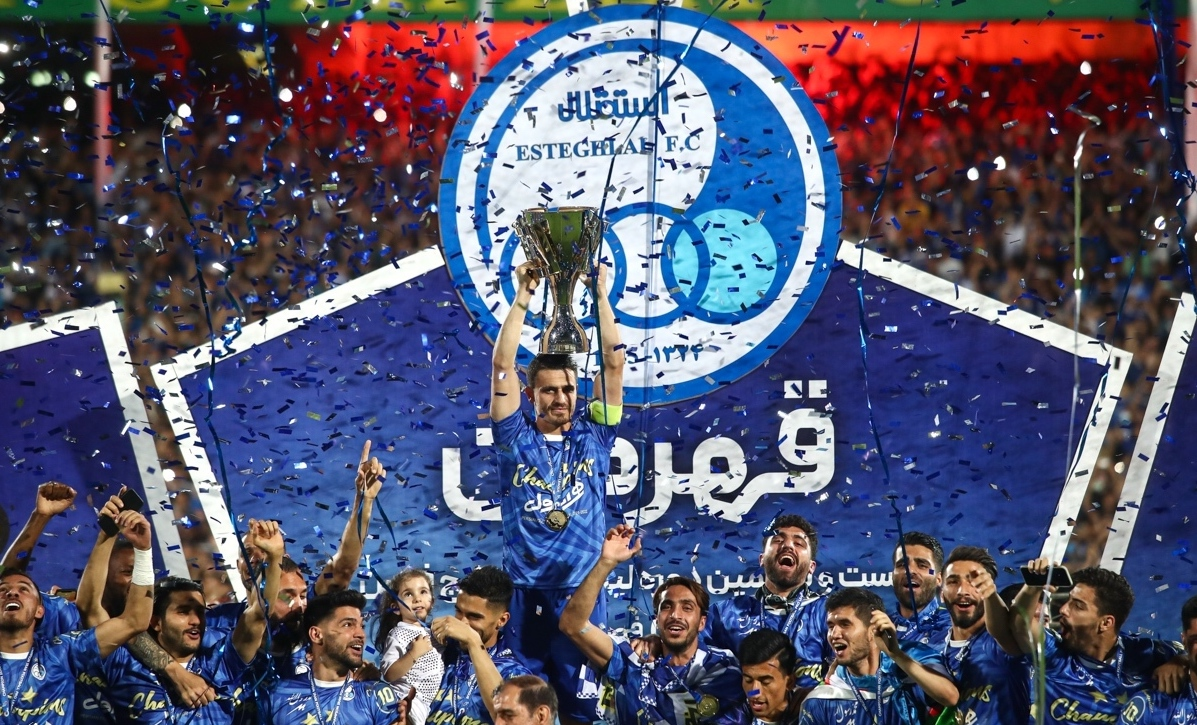
- Esteghlal championship celebration
- Season: 2021–22
- Dates: 19 October 2021 – 2 June 2022
- Champions: Esteghlal; 4th Pro League title 9th Iranian title
- Relegated: Shahr Khodro; Fajr Sepasi
- Matches: 237
- Goals: 425 (1.79 per match)
- Top goalscorer: Godwin Mensha (14 Goals)
- Best goalkeeper: Hossein Hosseini (18 CS)
- Biggest home win: Zob Ahan 4–0 Aluminium Arak (11 March 2022)
- Biggest away win: Naft MIS 0–3 Sepahan (24 October 2021); Zob Ahan 0–3 Mes Rafsanjan (4 December 2021); Paykan 0–3 Esteghlal (9 December 2021); Padideh 0–3 Esteghlal (24 December 2021); Naft MIS 0–3 Esteghlal (13 January 2022)
- Highest scoring: Gol Gohar 4–1 Tractor (20 October 2021); Sepahan 4–1 Naft MIS (12 February 2022); Mes Rafsanjan 3–2 Tractor (10 November 2021); Esteghlal 3–2 Mes Rafsanjan (8 January 2022); Gol Gohar 3–2 Zob Ahan (2 June 2022)
- Longest winning run: Esteghlal (6 matches)
- Longest unbeaten run: Esteghlal (30 matches)
- Longest winless run: Fajr Sepasi (25 matches)
- Longest losing run: Naft MIS (7 matches)
- Highest attendance: 85,000; Esteghlal – Naft MIS (30 May 2022)
- Lowest attendance: 0 (spectator ban); 199 matches
- Total attendance: 412,300
- Average attendance: 10,572 (matches with spectator bans not included)

The 2021–22 Persian Gulf Pro League (formerly known as Iran Pro League) was the 39th season of Iran's Football League and 21st as Persian Gulf Pro League since its establishment in 2001.Persepolis were the defending champions. Esteghlal won the league with a record 68-point through an unprecedented unbeaten campaign. The season featured 14 teams from the 2020–21 Persian Gulf Pro League and two new teams promoted from the 2020–21 Azadegan League: Fajr Sepasi and Havadar.

The 2021–22 season started 24 September 2021 and ended 20 June 2022.

== Teams ==
=== Stadia and locations ===
Locations of clubs in 2021–22 Persian Gulf Pro League

Team	Location	Stadium	Capacity
(Iran) Aluminium Arak	Arak	Imam Khomeini	15,000
(Iran) Esteghlal	Tehran	Azadi	78,116
(Iran) Fajr Sepasi	Shiraz	Pars	50,000
(Iran) Foolad	Ahvaz	Foolad Arena	30,655
(Iran) Gol Gohar Sirjan	Sirjan	Shahid Qasem Soleimani	9,000
(Iran) Havadar	Karaj	Enghelab Stadium	8,250
(Iran) Mes Rafsanjan	Rafsanjan	Shohadaye Mes	2,000
(Iran) Naft Masjed Soleyman	Masjed Soleyman	Behnam Mohammadi	8,000
(Iran) Nassaji Mazandaran	Qaem Shahr	Vatani	15,000
(Iran) Paykan	Shahr-e Qods	Shahr-e Qods	18,000
(Iran) Persepolis	Tehran	Azadi	78,116
(Iran) Sanat Naft	Abadan	Takhti Abadan	10,000
(Iran) Sepahan	Isfahan	Naghsh-e-Jahan	75,000
(Iran) Shahr Khodro	Mashhad	Imam Reza	27,700
(Iran) Tractor	Tabriz	Yadegar-e Emam	66,833
(Iran) Zob Ahan	Fooladshahr	Fooladshahr	20,000

=== Number of teams by region ===
Region	Number of teams	Teams
Tehran	4	Esteghlal, Havadar, Paykan, Persepolis
Khuzestan	3	Foolad, Naft Masjed Soleyman, Sanat Naft
Isfahan	2	Sepahan, Zob Ahan
Kerman	2	Gol Gohar Sirjan, Mes Rafsanjan
East Azarbaijan	1	Tractor
Fars	1	Fajr Sepasi
Markazi	1	Aluminium Arak
Mazandaran	1	Nassaji
Razavi Khorasan	1	Shahr Khodro

=== Personnel and kits ===
Note: Flags indicate national team as has been defined under FIFA eligibility rules. Players may hold more than one non-FIFA nationality.

Team	Manager	Captain	Kit manufacturer
Aluminium Arak	(Iran) Mehdi Rahmati	(Iran) Meysam Majidi	(Iran) Start
Esteghlal	(Iran) Farhad Majidi	(Iran) Voria Ghafouri	(Iran) Merooj
Fajr Sepasi	(Iran) Ali Kalantari	(Iran) Hamid Nemati	(Iran)
Foolad	(Iran) Javad Nekounam	(Iran) Ayoub Vali	(Iran) Merooj
Gol Gohar	(Iran) Amir Ghalenoei	(Iran) Amin Pourali	(Iran) Merooj
Havadar	(Iran) Reza Enayati	(Iran) Mohammad Ghazi	(Iran)
Mes Rafsanjan	(Iran) Mohammad Rabiei	(Iran) Mohsen Azarbad	(Iran) Merooj
Naft MIS	(Iran) Mahmoud Fekri	(Iran) Abbas Asgari	(Iran) Merooj
Nassaji	(Iran) Esmaeil Esmaeili	(Iran) Hamed Shiri	(Iran) Merooj
Paykan	(Iran) Mojtaba Hosseini	(Iran) Ebrahim Salehi	(Iran) Merooj
Persepolis	(Iran) Yahya Golmohammadi	(Iran) Jalal Hosseini	(Germany) Uhlsport
Sanat Naft	(Iran) Alireza Mansourian	(Iran) Hossein Baghlani	(Iran) Merooj
Sepahan	(Iran) Moharram Navidkia	(Iran) Jalaleddin Alimohammadi	(Germany) Uhlsport
Shahr Khodro	(Iran) Davoud Seyed Abbasi	(Iran) Milad Farahani	(Germany) Uhlsport
Tractor	(Turkey) Ertugrul Saglam	(Iran) Mohammad Reza Akhbari	(Iran) Start
Zob Ahan	(Iran) Mehdi Tartar	(Iran) Masoud Ebrahimzadeh	(Iran) Start

== Foreign players ==
The number of foreign players is restricted to four per Persian Gulf Pro League team, including a slot for a player from AFC countries. A team can use four foreign players on the field in each game, including at least one player from the AFC country.
In bold: Players that have been capped for their national team.

Club	Player 1	Player 2	Player 3	Asian Player	Former Player
Aluminium Arak					
Esteghlal	(Benin) **Rudy Gestede**	(Brazil) Raphael Silva	(France) Arthur Yamga	(Uzbekistan) **Azizbek Amonov**	
Fajr Sepasi					
Foolad	(Brazil) Chimba	(Mali) Moussa Coulibaly	(South Africa) **Ayanda Patosi**		
Gol Gohar	(Brazil) Kiros Stanlley				(Gabon) Eric Bocoum
Havadar					
Mes Rafsanjan	(Nigeria) Godwin Mensha	(Oman) **Faiz Al-Rushaidi**		(Oman) **Zahir Al-Aghbari**	
Naft MIS					(Iraq) **Karrar Jassim**
Nassaji					
Paykan	(South Sudan) **Tito Okello**				
Persepolis	(Tajikistan) **Vahdat Hanonov**	(Uzbekistan) **Sherzod Temirov**		(Tajikistan) **Manuchehr Safarov**	(Croatia) Božidar Radošević
Sanat Naft					
Sepahan	(Austria) Christopher Knett	(Georgia (country)) **Giorgi Gvelesiani**			
Shahr Khodro					
Tractor	(Portugal) Tiago Ferreira				
Zob Ahan					

== League table ==
=== Standings ===
Pos	Team	Pld	W	D	L	GF	GA	GD	Pts	
1	Esteghlal (Note: Esteghlal could not pay its debts on time and did not obtain an AFC license. Therefore, even if they earn the right to play in Asian competitions based on league position, they will not be able to participate. According to FFIRI special rules for ACL slots, the next best-ranked team of 2022–23 Persian Gulf Pro League will replace Esteghlal in ACL.) (C)	30	19	11	0	39	10	+29	68	
2	Persepolis (Note: Persepolis qualified to AFC Champions League group stage directly by winning the 2022–23 Persian Gulf Pro League.)	30	18	9	3	44	21	+23	63	
3	Sepahan (Note: Sepahan qualified to AFC Champions League group stage directly by being the runner-up in 2022–23 Persian Gulf Pro League.)	30	16	8	6	43	21	+22	56	
4	Gol Gohar	30	13	12	5	37	28	+9	51	
5	Foolad	30	13	10	7	30	22	+8	49	
6	Mes Rafsanjan	30	12	9	9	39	29	+10	45	
7	Zob Ahan	30	10	7	13	21	25	−4	37 (Note: Head-to-head points: Zob Ahan 4, Aluminium Arak 1.)	
8	Aluminium Arak	30	7	16	7	20	23	−3	37	
9	Paykan	30	7	15	8	26	27	−1	36 (Note: Head-to-head points: Paykan 2, Sanat Naft 2. Goal difference: Paykan −1, Sanat Naft −4.)	
10	Sanat Naft	30	9	9	12	26	30	−4	36	
11	Havadar	30	8	10	12	18	25	−7	34	
12	Nassaji Mazandaran (Note: Nassaji Mazandaran qualified to AFC Champions League group stage directly by winning the 2021–22 Hazfi Cup.)	30	6	15	9	24	34	−10	33	
13	Tractor (Note: Tractor qualified to AFC Champions League play-off round by the fourth place in 2022–23 Persian Gulf Pro League Because Esteghlal was on top three in that competition.)	30	7	10	13	26	32	−6	31	
14	Naft Masjed Soleyman	30	3	13	14	14	35	−21	22	
15	Shahr Khodro (R)	30	2	11	17	17	43	−26	17 (Note: Head-to-head points: Shahr Khodro 4, Fajr Sepasi 1.)	Relegation to 2022–23 Azadegan League
16	Fajr Sepasi (R)	30	2	11	17	10	29	−19	17	Relegation to 2022–23 Azadegan League

Updated to match(es) played on 2 June 2022. Source: Soccerway, IPL Table
Rules for classification: 1) Points; 2) Head-to-head points; 3) Head-to-head goal difference; 4) Head-to-head goals scored; 5) Goal difference; 6) Goals scored; 7) Play-off at neutral venue.
(Note: Head-to-head record is used only after all the matches between the teams in question have been played).
(C) Champions; (R) Relegated

== Results ==
Home \ Away	ALU	EST	FJR	FOL	GOL	HAV	MES	MIS	NSJ	PAY	PRS	SNA	SEP	SHK	TRC	ZOB
Aluminium Arak	—	1–1	1–0	3–0	0–0	0–1	0–1	2–1	0–0	1–1	1–0	2–1	0–0	2–2	1–0	0–0
Esteghlal	0–0	—	1–0	1–0	2–1	1–0	3–2	0–0	0–0	0–0	0–0	1–0	1–0	1–0	1–0	1–0
Fajr Sepasi	0–0	1–1	—	1–1	0–1	0–0	0–0	0–0	1–1	1–1	0–1	0–0	0–2	0–1	1–1	0–1
Foolad	1–0	1–2	1–0	—	1–1	1–0	2–1	2–0	1–1	1–1	1–3	0–0	3–0	2–0	0–0	1–2
Gol Gohar	2–0	0–3	2–0	0–1	—	1–0	2–2	2–0	1–1	0–0	1–1	2–1	0–3	3–3	4–1	3–2
Havadar	0–0	1–2	1–0	0–0	0–2	—	1–1	0–0	0–0	0–2	0–0	1–2	0–0	2–0	1–0	1–0
Mes Rafsanjan	0–0	0–2	2–1	1–1	1–2	1–0	—	0–0	1–2	0–0	1–1	3–0	3–1	3–0	3–2	0–1
Naft MIS	0–0	0–3	2–0	0–0	0–2	0–0	0–1	—	1–1	1–2	1–2	2–2	0–3	0–1	1–1	1–1
Nassaji	1–1	0–0	1–0	0–2	1–2	2–1	0–2	1–1	—	2–2	1–3	0–2	1–3	2–0	0–3	1–0
Paykan	1–1	0–3	0–1	1–2	3–0	1–2	1–1	0–0	0–1	—	1–3	0–0	0–1	1–1	0–0	1–0
Persepolis	2–0	1–1	1–0	1–0	1–1	2–2	3–1	1–0	2–1	2–0	—	1–0	1–2	2–1	2–1	2–0
Sanat Naft	3–1	1–1	0–2	0–1	0–0	3–0	0–2	2–0	1–1	0–0	2–0	—	2–4	1–0	1–0	0–1
Sepahan	1–1	1–1	2–0	2–1	0–0	1–0	2–0	4–1	2–0	1–2	0–1	1–0	—	3–0	0–0	0–0
Shahr Khodro	0–0	0–3	0–0	0–0	1–2	0–1	1–3	0–1	1–1	1–1	1–1	1–1	0–2	—	0–0	1–2
Tractor	0–2	0–1	2–1	1–2	0–0	3–2	1–0	2–0	1–1	1–2	0–3	3–0	2–2	1–0	—	0–1
Zob Ahan	4–0	0–2	2–0	0–1	0–0	0–1	0–3	0–1	0–0	0–2	1–1	0–1	1–0	2–1	0–0	—

Updated to match(es) played on 2 June 2022. Source: IPL Stats, Soccerway
Legend: Blue = home team win; Yellow = draw; Red = away team win.
For upcoming matches, an "a" indicates there is an article about the rivalry between the two participants.

=== Positions by round ===
Team ╲ Round	1	2	3	4	5	6	7	8	9	10	11	12	13	14	15	16	17	18	19	20	21	22	23	24	25	26	27	28	29	30
Esteghlal	4	4	2	1	2	1	2	2	2	2	1	1	1	1	1	1	1	1	1	1	1	1	1	1	1	1	1	1	1	1
Persepolis	2	3	6	6	7	4	4	5	5	4	3	2	2	2	2	2	2	2	2	2	2	2	2	2	2	2	2	2	2	2
Sepahan	3	1	1	3	3	2	1	1	1	1	2	3	3	3	3	3	3	3	3	3	3	3	3	3	3	3	3	3	3	3
Gol Gohar	1	2	3	4	5	7	9	11	8	8	9	9	8	7	8	7	7	6	6	5	5	5	6	6	6	6	5	5	5	4
Foolad	14	16	13	12	9	6	7	7	7	6	7	7	7	9	7	10	9	9	7	7	8	6	5	4	4	4	4	4	4	5
Mes Rafsanjan	15	7	9	9	10	9	6	6	4	5	5	5	4	5	5	4	4	4	4	4	4	4	4	5	5	5	6	6	6	6
Zob Ahan	5	10	12	7	6	8	8	8	9	11	12	10	9	10	11	11	11	12	12	12	12	9	9	9	10	9	10	7	7	7
Aluminium Arak	8	5	4	5	1	3	5	3	3	3	4	4	5	4	4	5	5	8	9	9	9	11	10	10	11	11	9	8	8	8
Paykan	10	6	5	2	4	5	3	4	6	7	6	6	6	6	6	6	6	5	5	6	6	7	7	7	7	7	7	9	9	9
Sanat Naft	12	15	16	15	14	15	13	13	15	14	15	12	12	11	10	8	8	7	8	8	7	8	8	8	8	8	11	11	11	10
Havadar	13	14	15	14	15	14	15	15	14	13	10	11	11	12	12	13	12	11	11	11	11	10	11	11	9	10	8	10	10	11
Nassaji	6	9	7	11	11	12	12	10	10	10	8	8	10	8	9	9	10	10	10	10	10	12	12	12	12	12	12	12	12	12
Tractor	16	8	11	13	13	10	10	12	12	9	11	13	13	13	13	12	13	13	13	13	13	13	13	13	13	13	13	13	13	13
Naft MIS	7	11	8	8	12	13	14	14	13	15	14	15	15	15	15	15	15	15	15	15	15	15	15	14	14	14	14	14	14	14
Shahr Khodro	9	12	14	16	16	16	16	16	16	16	16	16	16	16	16	16	16	16	16	16	16	16	16	16	16	16	16	16	16	15
Fajr Sepasi	11	13	10	10	8	11	11	9	11	12	13	14	14	14	14	14	14	14	14	14	14	14	14	15	15	15	15	15	15	16

Leader
Relegation to 2022-23 Azadegan League

Updated to match(es) played on 2 June 2022. Source: IPL Table

== Statistics ==
=== Top scorers ===
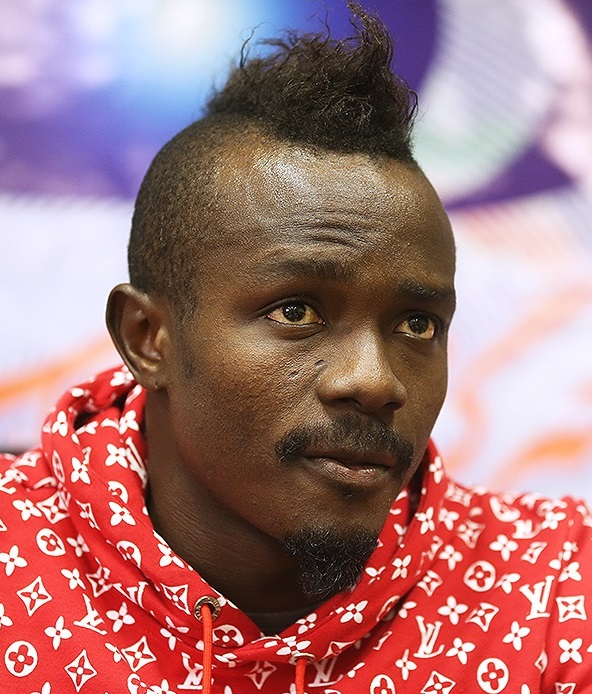
Godwin Mensha scored 14 goals in the Persian Gulf Pro League.

Rank	Player	Club	Goals
1	(Nigeria) Godwin Mensha	Mes Rafsanjan	14
2	(France) Arthur Yamga	Esteghlal	10
3	(Brazil) Luciano Pereira	Foolad	9
3	(Iran) Shahriyar Moghanlou	Sepahan	9
5	(Iran) Mohammad Abbaszadeh	Tractor	8
5	(Iran) Amirhossein Hosseinzadeh	Esteghlal	8
7	(Iran) Mehdi Abdi	Persepolis	7
7	(Iran) Karim Eslami	Nassaji	7
7	(Iran) Saeid Sadeghi	Gol Gohar	7
7	(Iran) Morteza Tabrizi	Gol Gohar	7

==== Hat-tricks ====
Player	For	Against	Result	Date

=== Clean sheets ===
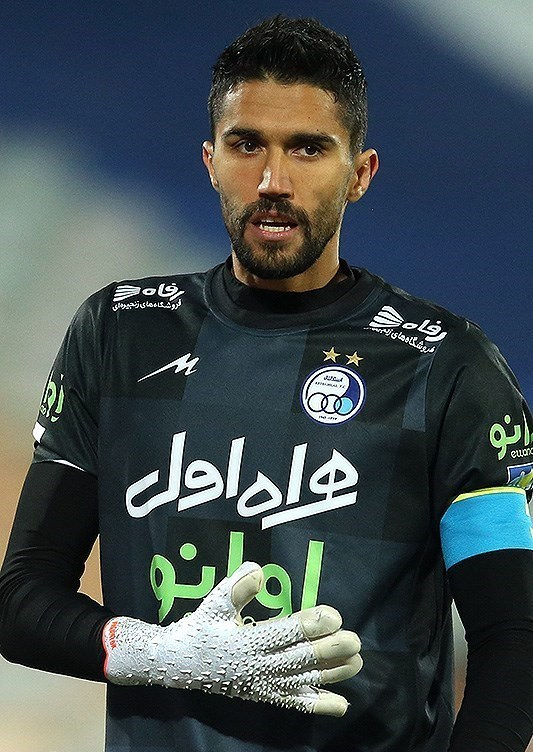
Hossein Hosseini won the Persian Gulf Pro League Golden Glove after keeping 18 clean sheets for Esteghlal.

Rank	Player	Club	Clean sheets
1	(Iran) Hossein Hosseini	Esteghlal	18
2	(Iran) Hossein Pour Hamidi	Aluminium Arak	14
3	(Iran) Mohsen Forouzan	Gol Gohar	13
4	(Iran) Habib Far Abbasi	Zob Ahan	11
4	(Iran) Ali Mohsenzadeh	Naft Masjed Soleyman	11
6	(Iran) Mohammad Reza Akhbari	Tractor	9
6	(Iran) Mehrdad Bashagerdi	Havadar	9
6	(Iran) Shahab Gordan	Foolad	9
6	(Iran) Alireza Haghighi	Nassaji	9
6	(Iran) Farhad Kermanshahi	Paykan	9
6	(Austria) Christopher Knett	Sepahan	9
6	(Iran) Hamed Lak	Persepolis	9

== Attendances ==
=== Average home attendances ===
Pos	Team	Total	High	Low	Average	Change
1	Esteghlal	187,000	85,000	0	37,400	n/a
2	Tractor	104,000	68,000	0	34,667	n/a
3	Persepolis	20,000	20,000	0	20,000	n/a
4	Sepahan	44,000	20,000	0	11,000	n/a
5	Fajr Sepasi	12,000	8,000	0	6,000	n/a
5	Foolad	6,000	6,000	0	6,000	n/a
7	Gol Gohar	12,000	3,000	0	3,000	n/a
7	Aluminium Arak	9,000	5,000	0	3,000	n/a
7	Sanat Naft	3,000	3,000	0	3,000	n/a
10	Naft MIS	5,500	3,000	0	2,750	n/a
11	Zob Ahan	5,400	5,000	0	1,800	n/a
12	Mes Rafsanjan	2,150	750	0	717	n/a
13	Nassaji	1,200	1,000	0	600	n/a
14	Shahr Khodro	500	500	0	500	n/a
15	Havadar	450	200	0	150	n/a
16	Paykan	100	100	0	100	n/a
	League total	412,300	85,000	0	10,572	n/a

Updated to games played on 30 May 2022
Source: Iranleague.ir
Notes:
Matches with spectator bans are not included in average attendances
Fajr Sepasi and Havadar played in the previous season in the Azadegan League

=== Attendances by round ===
Team/Round	1	2	3	4	5	6	7	8	9	10	11	12	13	14	15	16	17	18	19	20	21	22	23	24	25	26	27	28	29	30	Average
Aluminium Arak	A	NC	NC	A	NC	A	NC	A	NC	A	NC	A	NC	A	NC	NC	A	A	NC	A	NC	A	NC	A	5,000	A	2,000	A	2,000	A	3,000
Esteghlal	NC	A	NC	A	5,000	A	A	NC	A	NC	A	NC	A	NC	A	A	NC	A	NC	A	NC	NC	A	20,000	A	40,000	A	37,000	A	85,000	37,400
Fajr Sepasi	A	NC	A	NC	A	NC	A	NC	A	NC	A	NC	A	NC	A	NC	A	NC	A	NC	A	NC	A	NC	A	8,000	A	4,000	A	NC	6,000
Foolad	NC	A	NC	A	NC	A	NC	A	NC	A	NC	A	NC	A	NC	A	NC	A	NC	A	NC	A	NC	A	6,000	A	NC	A	NC	A	6,000
Gol Gohar	NC	A	NC	A	A	NC	A	NC	A	NC	A	NC	A	NC	A	A	NC	A	NC	NC	A	NC	A	3,000	A	3,000	A	3,000	A	3,000	3,000
Havadar	A	NC	A	NC	A	NC	A	NC	A	A	NC	A	NC	A	NC	NC	A	NC	A	NC	A	NC	A	NC	150	A	200	A	100	A	150
Naft MIS	A	NC	A	NC	A	NC	A	A	NC	A	NC	A	NC	A	NC	NC	A	NC	A	NC	A	NC	NC	A	3,000	A	NC	A	2,500	A	2,750
Nassaji	NC	A	A	NC	A	NC	A	NC	A	NC	A	NC	A	NC	A	A	NC	NC	A	NC	A	NC	A	NC	A	1,000	A	200	A	N/A	600
Mes Rafsanjan	A	NC	A	NC	NC	A	NC	A	NC	A	NC	A	NC	A	NC	NC	A	NC	A	A	NC	A	NC	A	700	A	700	A	750	A	717
Paykan	NC	A	NC	A	NC	A	NC	A	NC	NC	A	NC	A	NC	A	A	NC	A	NC	A	NC	A	NC	A	A	NC	A	NC	A	100	100
Persepolis	A	NC	A	NC	A	5,000	NC	A	NC	A	NC	A	NC	A	NC	NC	A	NC	A	NC	A	A	20,000	A	17,000	A	NC	A	2,000	A	11,000
Sanat Naft	NC	A	NC	A	NC	A	NC	NC	A	NC	A	NC	A	NC	A	A	NC	A	NC	A	NC	A	A	NC	A	NC	A	3,000	A	N/A	3,000
Sepahan	NC	A	NC	A	NC	A	NC	A	NC	A	NC	NC	A	NC	A	A	NC	A	NC	A	NC	A	NC	A	20,000	A	A	NC	A	NC	20,000
Shahr Khodro	NC	A	NC	A	NC	A	NC	A	NC	A	NC	A	NC	NC	A	A	NC	A	NC	A	NC	A	NC	A	NC	A	500	A	A	NC	500
Tractor	A	NC	A	NC	A	NC	A	NC	A	NC	A	NC	A	A	NC	NC	A	NC	A	NC	A	NC	A	16,000	A	20,000	A	68,000	NC	A	34,667
Zob Ahan	A	NC	A	NC	A	NC	A	NC	A	NC	A	A	NC	A	NC	NC	A	NC	A	NC	A	NC	A	NC	A	5,000	150	A	250	A	1,800
Total	0	0	0	0	5,000	5,000	0	0	0	0	0	0	0	0	0	0	0	0	0	0	0	0	20,000	39,000	51,850	77,000	3,550	115,200	7,600	88,100	412,300
Average	0	0	0	0	5,000	5,000	0	0	0	0	0	0	0	0	0	0	0	0	0	0	0	0	20,000	13,000	7,407	12,833	710	19,200	1,267	29,367	10,572

Notes:
Updated to games played on 30 May 2022. Source: Iranleague.ir
Matches with spectator bans are not included in average attendances

=== Highest attendances ===
Rank	Home team	Score	Away team	Attendance	Date	Week	Stadium
1	Esteghlal	0–0	Naft MIS	85,000	30 May 2022	30	Azadi
2	Tractor	0–3^{1}	Persepolis	68,000	19 May 2022	28	Sahand
3	Esteghlal	1–0	Shahr Khodro	40,000	9 May 2022	26	Azadi
4	Esteghlal	0–0	Aluminium Arak	37,000	19 May 2022	28	Azadi
5	Persepolis	1–1	Esteghlal	20,000	17 March 2022	23	Azadi
5	Esteghlal	0–0	Paykan	20,000	5 April 2022	24	Azadi
5	Sepahan	1–1	Esteghlal	20,000	4 May 2022	25	Naghsh-e Jahan
5	Tractor	3–2	Havadar	20,000	9 May 2022	26	Sahand
9	Persepolis	2–0	Paykan	17,000	4 May 2022	25	Azadi
10	Tractor	1–0	Mes Rafsanjan	16,000	3 April 2022	24	Sahand

Notes:
Updated to games played on 30 May 2022. Source: Iranleague.ir
^{1}The game was abandoned in the 70th minute after some home fans threw stones. Later the game was scored 0–3 for Persepolis by the disciplinary board.

== See also ==
- 2021–22 Azadegan League
- 2021–22 2nd Division
- 2021–22 3rd Division
- 2021–22 Hazfi Cup
- 2021 Iranian Super Cup
- 2022 AFC Champions League
