= 2023–24 Esteghlal F.C. season =

Esteghlal
2023–24 season
- President: Ali Khatir; Farshid Samiei
- Head coach: Javad Nekounam
- Stadium: Azadi Stadium
- Persian Gulf Pro League: 2nd
- Hazfi Cup: Round of 32
- Top goalscorer: League: Mehrdad Mohammadi (8); All: Mehrdad Mohammadi (8)
- Average home league attendance: 34,150
- Biggest win: Esteghlal 4–0 Nassaji
- Biggest defeat: Sepahan 1–0 Esteghlal
Home colours	Away colours
- All statistics correct as of 27 February 2024.

The 2023–24 Esteghlal Football Club season is the 78th season and the club's 30th consecutive season in the top flight of Iranian football. In addition to the domestic league, Esteghlal are participating in this season's editions of the Hazfi Cup.

The club will not compete in the AFC Champions League (2023–24) after failing to obtain an AFC license.

== Summary ==
=== Pre-season ===
After Ricardo Sá Pinto's departure, On 20 June 2023, Esteghlal announced that Javad Nekounam would take over the head coaching position. On 1 July, Esteghlal announced the signing of Mehrdad Mohammadi on a free transfer from Al Sailiya. Mohammadi signed on a two-year contract.

=== August ===
On 10 August, Esteghlal started their 2023–24 season with a 3–0 win at the Takhti, beating Sanat Naft in the first matchday of Persian Gulf Pro League.

== Players ==
Last updated: 16 February 2024

No.	Name	Nat	Position	Date of Birth (Age)	Since	End	Signed from
Goalkeepers
1	Hossein Hosseini (c)	(Iran)	GK	30 June 1992 (aged 31)	2012	2025	(Iran) Youth Sector
12	Mohammad Reza Khaledabadi	(Iran)	GK	30 April 2001 (aged 22)	2023	2026	(Iran) Havadar
22	Mohammad Javad Kia	(Iran)	GK	29 August 2001 (aged 22)	2023	2026	(Iran) Aluminium
Defenders
2	Saleh Hardani	(Iran)	RB / RM	14 September 1998 (aged 25)	2022	2024	(Iran) Foolad
3	Mohammad Hossein Moradmand	(Iran)	CB	22 June 1993 (aged 30)	2020	2025	(Iran) Shahr Khodro
5	Armin Sohrabian	(Iran)	CB	26 July 1995 (aged 28)	2023	2025	(Iran) Gol Gohar
6	Iman Salimi	(Iran)	CB	1 June 1996 (aged 27)	2023	2025	(Iran) Mes Rafsanjan
17	Jafar Salmani	(Iran)	LB / LW	12 January 1997 (aged 26)	2021	2024	(Portugal) Portimonense
30	Saman Touranian	(Iran)	RB	12 November 2001 (aged 22)	2023	2026	(Iran) Mes Kerman
33	Abolfazl Jalali	(Iran)	LB / CB	26 June 1998 (aged 25)	2021	2024	(Iran) Saipa
34	Milad Fakhreddini	(Iran)	RB	26 May 1990 (aged 33)	2024	2025	(Iran) Aluminium Arak
55	Raphael Silva	(Brazil)	CB	20 April 1992 (aged 31)	2024	2025	Unattached
Midfielders
4	Rouzbeh Cheshmi	(Iran)	DM / CB	24 July 1993 (aged 30)	2021	2024	(Qatar) Umm Salal
9	Mehdi Mehdipour	(Iran)	CM / DM / AM	18 February 1994 (aged 29)	2020	2024	(Iran) Zob Ahan
14	Zobeir Niknafs	(Iran)	DM / CM	12 April 1993 (aged 30)	2021	2024	(Iran) Foolad
26	Omid Hamedifar	(Iran)	DM / CB	20 August 2000 (aged 23)	2022	2024	(Iran) Sanat Naft
80	Mohammad Hossein Zavari	(Iran)	CM / AM	11 January 2001 (aged 22)	2022	2024	(Iran) Sanat Naft
88	Arash Rezavand	(Iran)	AM / CM / DM	5 October 1993 (aged 30)	2019	2024	(Iran) Saipa
99	Amirali Sadeghi	(Iran)	LW / AM	9 February 2001 (aged 22)	2021	2024	(Iran) Saipa
Forwards
7	Mehrdad Mohammadi	(Iran)	CF / RW	29 September 1993 (aged 30)	2023	2025	(Qatar) Al Sailiya
10	Peyman Babaei	(Iran)	CF / LW / RW	14 December 1994 (aged 29)	2022	2024	(Iran) Tractor
19	Gustavo Blanco	(Argentina)	CF	5 November 1991 (aged 32)	2023	2025	(Spain) Eibar
23	Arman Ramezani	(Iran)	CF	22 June 1992 (aged 31)	2021	2024	(Iran) Persepolis
77	Jaloliddin Masharipov	(Uzbekistan)	LW / RW	1 September 1993 (aged 30)	2024	2025	(Greece) Panserraikos
Players transferred during the season
8	Saeid Mehri	(Iran)	CM / AM	16 September 1995 (aged 28)	2021	2024	(Iran) Tractor
11	Arthur Yamga	(France)	RW / RB	7 September 1996 (aged 27)	2021	2025	(Denmark) Vejle
72	Arsalan Motahari	(Iran)	CF / RW	10 March 1993 (aged 30)	2020	2024	(Iran) Zob Ahan
79	Sobhan Khaghani	(Iran)	RW / AM	10 March 1993 (aged 30)	2020	2024	(Iran) Tractor

== Transfers ==
=== In ===
Date	Pos.	Player	From	Type	Ref.
30 June 2023	MF	(Iran) Erfan Bagheri	Saipa	End of loan	
1 July 2023	FW	(Iran) Mehrdad Mohammadi	(Qatar) Al Sailiya	Transfer	
2 July 2023	DF	(Iran) Armin Sohrabian	Gol Gohar	Transfer	
16 July 2023	DF	(Iran) Iman Salimi	Mes Rafsanjan	Transfer	
22 July 2023	FW	(Iran) Aria Barzegar	Naft MIS	Transfer	
22 July 2023	GK	(Iran) Mohammad Reza Khaledabadi	Havadar	Transfer	
26 July 2023	GK	(Iran) Matin Mohtasham	Aluminium Arak	Transfer	
3 August 2023	MF	(Iraq) Muntadher Mohammed	(Iraq) Al-Naft	Transfer	
21 August 2023	DF	(Iran) Saman Touranian	Mes Kerman	Transfer	
30 August 2023	FW	(Argentina) Gustavo Blanco	(Spain) Eibar	Transfer	
30 August 2023	GK	(Iran) Mohammad Javad Kia	Aluminium Arak	Transfer	
4 January 2024	DF	(Brazil) Raphael Silva	Unattached	Transfer	
4 February 2024	FW	(Uzbekistan) Jaloliddin Masharipov	(Greece) Panserraikos	Transfer	
14 February 2024	DF	(Iran) Milad Fakhreddini	(Iran) Aluminium Arak	Transfer	

=== Out ===
Date	Pos.	Player	To	Type	Ref.
1 June 2023	FW	(Iran) Mohammad Mohebi	(Portugal) Santa Clara	Loan return	
1 June 2023	FW	(Iran) Mehdi Ghayedi	(United Arab Emirates) Shabab Al Ahli	Loan return	
24 June 2023	DF	(Brazil) Raphael Silva	Unattached	Contract termination	
11 July 2023	GK	(Iran) Arsha Shakouri	Havadar	End of contract	
30 July 2023	FW	(Iran) Sajjad Shahbazzadeh	Mes Rafsanjan	Transfer	
6 August 2023	DF	(Iran) Amirhossein Jalalivand	Esteghlal Khuzestan	Transfer	
6 August 2023	MF	(Iran) Mohammad Reza Torabi	Nassaji Mazandaran	Transfer	
14 August 2023	MF	(Iraq) Muntadher Mohammed	Mes Rafsanjan	Loan	
20 August 2023	FW	(Iran) Aria Barzegar	Nassaji Mazandaran	Transfer	
21 August 2023	GK	(Iran) Sina Saeidifar	Shams Azar	Loan	
28 August 2023	MF	(Iran) Morteza Javaheri	Tractor	Transfer	
1 September 2023	GK	(Iran) Mohammad Reza Dinarvand	Paykan	Transfer	
1 September 2023	MF	(Iran) Amirhossein Parniaei	Paykan	Transfer	
5 September 2023	MF	(Iran) Sobhan Khaghani	Zob Ahan	Transfer	
27 September 2023	GK	(Iran) Matin Mohtasham	Naft MIS	Transfer	
3 October 2023	MF	(Iran) Erfan Bagheri	Paykan	Transfer	
17 January 2024	GK	(Iran) Alireza Rezaei	Nassaji Mazandaran	Transfer	
29 January 2024	MF	(Iran) Saeid Mehri	(Cyprus) APOEL	Transfer	
31 January 2024	FW	(Iran) Hesam Eskandari	Shahrdari Astara	Loan	
25 February 2024	DF	(Iran) Aref Gholami	(Bosnia and Herzegovina) Velež Mostar	End of contract	
25 February 2024	FW	(Iran) Arsalan Motahari	Tractor	Transfer	

=== Contract renewals ===
Date	Pos.	Name	Contract length	Contract ends	Ref.
25 June 2023	DF	(Iran) Jafar Salmani	N/A	N/A	
11 July 2023	DF	(Iran) Mohammad Hossein Moradmand	2-year	2025	
16 July 2023	GK	(Iran) Hossein Hosseini	2-year	2025	
8 August 2023	DF	(Iran) Abolfazl Jalali	N/A	N/A	
14 August 2023	MF	(Iraq) Muntadher Mohammed	1-year	2026	
16 August 2023	MF	(Iran) Saeid Mehri	N/A	N/A	

== Pre-season and friendlies ==
10 July 2023 Friendly	Esteghlal	4–0	Esteghlal Academy	Tehran
	Hardani; Rezavand; Azmoun; Ramezani	Report		Stadium: Nasser Hejazi Camp

13 July 2023 Friendly	Paykan	0–3	Esteghlal	Tehran
17:45 UTC+3:30		Report	Motahari; Mohammadi (pen.); Khaghani	Stadium: Dastgerdi

17 July 2023 Friendly	Esteghlal	2–4	Havadar	Tehran
17:30 UTC+3:30	Moradmand; Motahari	Report	Moradi (pen.); Saharkhizan; Pasandideh; Sefid-Choghaei	Stadium: Nasser Hejazi Camp; Referee: Shahin Yazdani

23 July 2023 Friendly	Esteghlal	1–1	Aluminium Arak	Tehran
17:45 UTC+3:30	Niknafs	Report	Sharifat (pen.)	Stadium: Dastgerdi

4 August 2023 Friendly	Esteghlal	2–0	Ario Eslamshahr	Tehran
19:00 UTC+3:30	Yamga (pen.); Babaei	Report		Stadium: Dastgerdi

11 August 2023 Friendly	Esteghlal	2–2	Shahr Raz	Tehran
	Mohammadi (pen.)	Report	Firouzi; Aghababaei	Stadium: Nasser Hejazi Camp

18 August 2023 Friendly	Esteghlal	0–2	Damash	Tehran
17:00 UTC+3:30		Report	Salimi 59' (o.g.); Alizadeh 67' (pen.)	Stadium: Homa

12 September 2023 Friendly	Esteghlal	3–1	Sanat Naft	Tehran
	Mohammadi 45' (pen.) (red card) 51'; Babaei 68'; Rezavand 79'	Report	Rikani 89'	Stadium: Nasser Hejazi Camp

21 September 2023 Friendly	Gol Gohar	1–1	Esteghlal	Tehran
16:00 UTC+3:30	Saharkhizan	Report	Ramezani	Stadium: Alyaf Camp

2 October 2023 Friendly	Esteghlal	1–0	Malavan	Tehran
15:00 UTC+3:30	Ramezani 12'	Report

8 October 2023 Friendly	Esteghlal	5–0	Bolandpayeh Yademan	Tehran
	Sadeghi; Eskandari; Babaei	Report		Stadium: Nasser Hejazi Camp

14 October 2023 Friendly	Esteghlal	2–0	Payam	Tehran
	Jalali; Sadeghi	Report		Stadium: Nasser Hejazi Camp

19 November 2023 Friendly	Esteghlal	1–0	Naft MIS	Tehran
14:00 UTC+3:30	Yamga	Report		Stadium: Alyaf Camp

1 December 2023 Friendly	Esteghlal	4–0	Khooshe Talaei	Tehran
15:00 UTC+3:30	Babaei; Blanco; Mohammadi; Ramezani	Report		Stadium: Nasser Hejazi Camp

19 January 2024 Friendly	Esteghlal	0–0	Ario Eslamshahr	Tehran
14:00 UTC+3:30		Report		Stadium: Dastgerdi

26 January 2024 Friendly	Esteghlal	6–0	Setaregan Atrak	Tehran
14:00 UTC+3:30	Ramezani; Zavari; Blanco; Mohammadi (pen.); Farashbandi	Report		Stadium: Nasser Hejazi Camp

3 February 2024 Friendly	Esteghlal	1–1	Nassaji	Tehran
14:00 UTC+3:30	Mohammadi 87' (pen.)	Report	Barzegar 63'	Stadium: Nasser Hejazi Camp

9 February 2024 Friendly	Esteghlal	1–0	Mes Rafsanjan	Tehran
14:00 UTC+3:30	Blanco	Report		Stadium: Azadi

== Competitions ==
=== Overview ===
Competition	First match	Last match	Starting round	Final position	Record							
Competition	First match	Last match	Starting round	Final position	Pld	W	D	L	GF	GA	GD	Win %
Persian Gulf Pro League	10 August 2023	1 June 2024	Matchday 1	2nd	30	19	10	1	40	15	+25	63.33
Hazfi Cup	4 March 2024		Round of 32	Round of 32	1	0	0	1	0	2	−2	0.00
Total					31	19	10	2	40	17	+23	61.29

Last updated: 1 June 2024
Source: Soccerway

=== Persian Gulf Pro League ===
==== Standings ====
Pos	Team	Pld	W	D	L	GF	GA	GD	Pts	Qualification or relegation
1	Persepolis (C)	30	20	8	2	45	18	+27	68	Qualification for the 2024–25 AFC Champions League Elite phase
2	Esteghlal	30	19	10	1	40	15	+25	67	Qualification for the 2024–25 AFC Champions League Elite phase
3	Sepahan	30	17	6	7	53	26	+27	57	Qualification for the 2024–25 AFC Champions League Elite qualifying play-offs (Note: Qualified as the 2023–24 Hazfi Cup winners.)
4	Tractor	30	16	6	8	42	22	+20	54	Qualification for the 2024–25 AFC Champions League Two group stage
5	Zob Ahan	30	11	9	10	30	29	+1	42	

Source: Iran Football League Organization - League Full Table, Iplstats
Rules for classification: 1) Points; 2) Head-to-head points; 3) Head-to-head goal difference; 4) Total goal difference; 5) Total goals scored; 6) Play-off at neutral venue.
(Note: Head-to-head record is used only after all the matches between the teams in question have been played).
(C) Champions

==== Results summary ====
Overall								Home						Away					
Pld	W	D	L	GF	GA	GD	Pts	W	D	L	GF	GA	GD	W	D	L	GF	GA	GD
30	19	10	1	40	15	+25	67	13	2	0	25	8	+17	6	8	1	15	7	+8

Source: Ipl Stats

==== Results by round ====
Round	1	2	3	4	5	6	7	8	9	10	11	12	13	14	15	16	17	18	19	20	21	22	23	24	25	26	27	28	29	30
Ground	A	H	A	H	A	H	A	H	A	H	A	A	H	A	H	H	A	H	A	H	A	H	A	H	A	H	H	A	H	A
Result	W	W	L	W	D	W	W	W	D	W	D	D	W	D	W	W	D	W	W	D	W	D	W	W	D	W	W	D	W	W
Position	1	2	4	3	4	4	3	2	1	1	2	2	2	2	1	1	1	1	1	1	1	1	1	1	1	1	1	2	2	2

Updated to match(es) played on 1 June 2024. Source: "Iran Football League Organization - League Full Table".
A = Away; H = Home; W = Win; D = Draw; L = Loss

==== Matches ====
The league fixtures were announced on 9 July.

10 August 2023 1	Sanat Naft	0–3	Esteghlal	Abadan
21:30 UTC+3:30	Tohidast (yellow card) 85'; Panahi (yellow card) 90+5'; Tahami (yellow card) 90+9'	Report	Moradmand (yellow card) 3'; Rezavand 30'; Motahari 46'; Hardani 58'; Jalali (yellow card) 90+9'	Stadium: Takhti; Attendance: 10,000; Referee: Mouood Bonyadifar

17 August 2023 2	Esteghlal	1–0	Malavan	Tehran
19:30 UTC+3:30	Jalali (yellow card) 21'; Cheshmi (yellow card) 76'; Moradmand 80'	Report	Ahmadi (penalty missed) 7'; Bagheri (yellow card) 51'; Akvan (yellow card) 61'; Akbar Monadi (yellow card) 65'	Stadium: Azadi; Attendance: 0 (Note: The match was played behind closed doors due to the repairs and reconstruction of the stadium.); Referee: Seyed Reza Mahdavi

23 August 2023 3	Sepahan	1–0	Esteghlal	Isfahan
20:00 UTC+3:30	Shekari (yellow card) 43'; Asadi (penalty missed) 45+9' 45+9'; Ahmadzadeh (yellow card) 71' (yellow-red card) 86'	Report	Salimi (yellow card) 45+1'; Hosseini (yellow card) 84'	Stadium: Naghsh-e-Jahan; Attendance: 60,000; Referee: Kopal Nazemi

28 August 2023 4	Esteghlal	1–0	Esteghlal Khuzestan	Tehran
19:30 UTC+3:30	Rezavand (yellow card) 35'; Mohammadi 51'; Khaghani (yellow card) 90+4'	Report	Tayyebi (yellow card) 20'; Kaabi (yellow card) 45+4'	Stadium: Azadi; Attendance: 0 Referee: Amir Saman Soltani

14 December 2023 5	Persepolis	1–1	Esteghlal	Tehran
16:15 UTC+3:30	Sadeghi (yellow card) 54'; Alishah 77' (yellow card) 78'	Report	Hamedifar (yellow card) 50'; Cheshmi (yellow card) 53'; Yamga 90+7' (pen.); Hardani (yellow card) 90+8'	Stadium: Azadi; Attendance: 64,000; Referee: Mouood Bonyadifar

20 October 2023 6	Esteghlal	3–2	Havadar	Tehran
18:00 UTC+3:30	Yamga 23' (pen.); Salmani (yellow card) 50'; Mohammadi 61', 84'; Hamedifar (yellow card) 90+6'	Report	Mohebi 5'; Salimi 17' (o.g.); Eslamikhah (yellow card) 52'; Abdi (yellow card) 75'; Mansouri (yellow card) 86'	Stadium: Azadi; Attendance: 26,800; Referee: Bijan Heydari

7 October 2023 7	Mes Rafsanjan	0–1	Esteghlal	Rafsanjan
17:45 UTC+3:30	Bagheri (yellow card) 26'; Pereira (yellow card) 72'; Khodabandelou (yellow card) 85'	Report	Mohammadi (yellow card) 25'; Teymouri 52' (o.g.)	Stadium: Shohadaye Mes Rafsanjan; Attendance: 1,000; Referee: Hassan Akrami

27 October 2023 8	Esteghlal	1–0	Aluminium	Tehran
18:00 UTC+3:30	Ramezani (yellow card) 11' (goal) 37'; Mehdipour (yellow card) 72'; Hosseini (yellow card) 80'; Moradmand (yellow card) 80' (yellow-red card) 83'	Report	Ghahari (yellow card) 14'; Mousavi (yellow card) 43'; Haji Eydi (yellow card) 80'; Tabrizi (yellow card) 80'	Stadium: Azadi; Attendance: 25,000; Referee: Seyed Reza Mahdavi

2 November 2023 9	Shams Azar	2–2	Esteghlal	Qazvin
15:30 UTC+3:30	Jafari (yellow card) 32'; Nesaei 47'; Rabizadeh (yellow card) 63'; Goudarzi 75'	Report	Yamga 25' (pen.); Mehdipour (yellow card) 45'; Ramezani 60'	Stadium: Sardar Azadegan; Attendance: 15,000; Referee: Yaser Hamrang

11 November 2023 10	Esteghlal	2–0	Tractor	Tehran
16:20 UTC+3:30	Sohrabian (yellow card) 24'; Salimi 26'; Blanco 50'	Report	Hashemnejad (yellow card) 30'; Khalilzadeh (yellow card) 45+2'; Hadi (yellow card) 64'	Stadium: Azadi; Attendance: 45,000; Referee: Seyed Vahid Kazemi

25 November 2023 11	Zob Ahan	1–1	Esteghlal	Fooladshahr
17:30 UTC+3:30	Mehdipour 77' (o.g.); Kamyabinia (yellow card) 88'	Report	Sohrabian 62' (yellow card) 72'; Hamedifar (yellow card) 64'; Ramezani (yellow card) 88'	Stadium: Foolad Shahr; Attendance: 13,000; Referee: Amir Saman Soltani

9 December 2023 12	Foolad	0–0	Esteghlal	Ahvaz
17:45 UTC+3:30	Shojaei (yellow card) 18'; Askari (yellow card) 54'; Moridi (yellow card) 71'; Alinejad (yellow card) 90'	Report	Rezavand (yellow card) 18'; Cheshmi (yellow card) 44'; Mehdipour (yellow card) 65'; Salmani (yellow card) 90+7'	Stadium: Foolad Arena; Attendance: 30,000; Referee: Seyed Ali Asghar Momeni

19 December 2023 13	Esteghlal	4–0	Nassaji	Tehran
17:30 UTC+3:30	Sohrabian 43'; Mohammadi 62'; Ramezani 64'; Jalali 68'; Yamga (yellow card) 73'; Mohammadi (yellow card) 84'	Report	Houshmand (yellow card) 53'; Ghaed-Rahmati (yellow card) 89'	Stadium: Azadi; Attendance: 10,000; Referee: Bijan Heydari

24 December 2023 14	Gol Gohar	1–1	Esteghlal	Sirjan
15:00 UTC+3:30	Zahedi 20'; Bou Hamdan (yellow card) 38'; Alizadeh (yellow card) 80'	Report	Yamga 45+2' (pen.); Hardani (yellow card) 45+4'; Jalali (yellow card) 80'	Stadium: Qasem Soleimani; Attendance: 7,000; Referee: Payam Heydari

30 December 2023 15	Esteghlal	2–1	Paykan	Tehran
16:30 UTC+3:30	Sohrabian 61'; Babaei 72'	Report	Azadeh (yellow card) 58'; Shahim 90+5'	Stadium: Azadi; Attendance: 10,000; Referee: Amir Saman Soltani

16 February 2024 16	Esteghlal	1–0	Sanat Naft	Tehran
17:15 UTC+3:30	Sohrabian (yellow card) 20'; Rezavand (yellow card) 39'; Mehdipour 47' (yellow card) 75'; Hardani (yellow card) 61'; Silva (yellow card) 74'	Report	Alboghobeysh (yellow card) 75'	Stadium: Azadi; Attendance: 0 Referee: Hassan Akrami

22 February 2024 17	Malavan	1–1	Esteghlal	Bandar-e Anzali
17:15 UTC+3:30	https://footba11.co/match/1201267: Ghazipour (yellow card) 45+2'; Soleimani 65'; Eidi (yellow card) 71'		Hamedifar (yellow card) 24'; Masharipov 66'	Stadium: Sirous Ghayeghran; Attendance: 8,000; Referee: Ali Asghar Momeni

27 February 2024 18	Esteghlal	1–0	Sepahan	Tehran
17:15 UTC+3:30	Cheshmi 36'; Salimi (yellow card) 40'; Blanco (yellow card) 65'; Hamedifar (yellow card) 90+2'	Report	Yazdani (yellow card) 40'; Arabi (yellow card) 56'	Stadium: Azadi; Attendance: 20,000; Referee: Payam Heidari

8 March 2024 19	Esteghlal Khuzestan	0–1	Esteghlal	Ahvaz
19:45 UTC+3:30	Rostam (yellow card) 38'; Ahmadi (yellow card) 52'; Tursunov (yellow card) 67'	Report	Blanco 41'	Stadium: Ghadir; Referee: Mouood Bonyadifar

13 March 2024 20	Esteghlal	0–0	Persepolis	Tehran
20:00 UTC+3:30	Rezavand (yellow card) 40'; Hamedifar (yellow card) 50'	Report	Rafiei (yellow card) 45+5'	Stadium: Azadi; Attendance: 55,000; Referee: Vahid Kazemi

17 March 2024 21	Havadar	0–1	Esteghlal	Tehran
21:00 UTC+3:30	Miri (yellow card) 40'; Goudarzi (yellow card) 88'; Pourali (yellow card) 90+3'	Report	Sohrabian 1'	Stadium: Dastgerdi; Attendance: 0 Referee: Ali Safaei

6 April 2024 22	Esteghlal	2–2	Mes Rafsanjan	Tehran
19:00 UTC+3:30	Sohrabian (yellow card) 4'; Blanco 16', 50'	Report	Shahbazzadeh 3'; Vasei 46'; Shahriari (yellow card) 88'	Stadium: Azadi; Attendance: 10,000; Referee: Bijan Heidari

12 April 2024 23	Aluminium	0–1	Esteghlal	Arak
18:00 UTC+3:30	Mousavi (yellow card) 60'	Report	Fakhreddini (yellow card) 3'; Blanco 46'; Masharipov (yellow card) 61'	Stadium: Imam Khomeini; Attendance: 15,000; Referee: Reza Adel

19 April 2024 24	Esteghlal	3–2	Shams Azar	Tehran
18:00 UTC+3:30	Mohammadi 21', 51' (pen.); Mohammadi 77'	Report	Rezaei (yellow card) 49'; Jafarpour (yellow card) 57'; Emamali 83'; Fakhrian 85'	Stadium: Azadi; Attendance: 40,000; Referee: Vahid Kazemi

1 May 2024 25	Tractor	0–0	Esteghlal	Tabriz
17:00 UTC+3:30	Hosseini (yellow card) 35'; Aghasi (yellow card) 53'; Abdi (yellow card) 85'	Report	Mohammadi (yellow card) 22'; Niknafs (yellow card) 88'	Stadium: Sahand; Attendance: 30,000; Referee: Payam Heidari

6 May 2024 26	Esteghlal	2–1	Zob Ahan	Tehran
20:30 UTC+3:30	Salimi (yellow card) 1'; Cheshmi (yellow card) 57'; Masharipov 64'; Hardani (yellow card) 69'; Blanco 90+4'	Report	Aliyari 6' (yellow card) 52'; Kamyabinia (yellow card) 48'; Mohammadi (yellow card) 54'; Eslami (yellow card) 57'; Gerami (yellow card) 68'; Forouzan (yellow card) 89'	Stadium: Azadi; Attendance: 30,000; Referee: Kopal Nazemi

13 May 2024 27	Esteghlal	1–0	Foolad	Tehran
19:30 UTC+3:30	Hamedifar (yellow card) 49'; Salimi 58'; Touranian (yellow card) 77'; Silva (yellow card) 84'	Report	Coulibaly (yellow card) 33'; Hesar (yellow card) 45+2'; Gordan (yellow card) 90+7'	Stadium: Azadi; Attendance: 40,000; Referee: Mouood Bonyadifar

24 May 2024 28	Nassaji	0–0	Esteghlal	Qaem Shahr
19:45 UTC+3:30	Bagheri (yellow card) 73'; Zamehran (yellow card) 83'	Report	Niknafs (yellow card) 28'; Salimi (yellow card) 54'; Jalali (yellow card) 72'; Rezavand (yellow card) 87'	Stadium: Vatani; Attendance: 16,000; Referee: Payam Heidari

28 May 2024 29	Esteghlal	1–0	Gol Gohar	Tehran
20:00 UTC+3:30	Cheshmi 45+2'; Salimi (yellow card) 85'	Report	Arta (yellow card) 83'	Stadium: Azadi; Attendance: 40,000; Referee: Vahid Kazemi

1 June 2024 30	Paykan	0–2	Esteghlal	Tehran
19:00 UTC+3:30	Sattari (yellow card) 24'; Fallah (yellow card) 50'; Dinarvand (red card) 55'; Ajhir (yellow card) 59'; Ghorbani (yellow card) 71'	Report	Mohammadi 21', 22'; Hamedifar (yellow card) 61'	Stadium: Dastgerdi; Attendance: 0 (Note: The match was played behind closed doors.); Referee: Hassan Akrami

=== Hazfi Cup ===
4 March 2024 Round of 32	Mes Rafsanjan	2–0	Esteghlal	Rafsanjan
17:00 UTC+3:30	Lak (yellow card) 10'; Mohebi 24'; Soleimanzadeh (yellow card) 45'; Mohammed 67'	Report	Hardani (penalty missed) 12'	Stadium: Shohadaye Mes Rafsanjan; Attendance: 5,000; Referee: Reza Adel

== Statistics ==
=== Squad statistics ===
No.	Pos	Nat	Player	Total		Pro League		Hazfi Cup	
No.	Pos	Nat	Player	Apps	Goals	Apps	Goals	Apps	Goals
1	GK	(Iran)	Hossein Hosseini	30	0	29	0	1	0
2	DF	(Iran)	Saleh Hardani	26	1	25	1	1	0
3	DF	(Iran)	Mohammad Hossein Moradmand	17	2	16	2	1	0
4	MF	(Iran)	Rouzbeh Cheshmi	29	2	28	2	1	0
5	DF	(Iran)	Armin Sohrabian	18	4	17	4	1	0
6	DF	(Iran)	Iman Salimi	22	2	22	2	0	0
7	FW	(Iran)	Mehrdad Mohammadi	28	8	27	8	1	0
9	MF	(Iran)	Mehdi Mehdipour	23	1	22	1	1	0
10	FW	(Iran)	Peyman Babaei	19	1	19	1	0	0
12	GK	(Iran)	Mohammad Reza Khaledabadi	1	0	1	0	0	0
14	MF	(Iran)	Zobeir Niknafs	23	0	23	0	0	0
17	MF	(Iran)	Jafar Salmani	24	0	23	0	1	0
19	FW	(Argentina)	Gustavo Blanco	25	6	24	6	1	0
23	FW	(Iran)	Arman Ramezani	28	3	27	3	1	0
26	MF	(Iran)	Omid Hamedifar	23	0	22	0	1	0
30	DF	(Iran)	Saman Touranian	3	0	3	0	0	0
33	DF	(Iran)	Abolfazl Jalali	30	1	29	1	1	0
34	DF	(Iran)	Milad Fakhreddini	9	0	8	0	1	0
55	DF	(Brazil)	Raphael Silva	11	0	10	0	1	0
77	MF	(Uzbekistan)	Jaloliddin Masharipov	15	2	14	2	1	0
80	MF	(Iran)	Mohammad Hossein Zavari	1	0	1	0	0	0
88	MF	(Iran)	Arash Rezavand	30	1	29	1	1	0
99	MF	(Iran)	Amirali Sadeghi	1	0	1	0	0	0
Players transferred/loaned out during the season
8	MF	(Iran)	Saeid Mehri	11	0	11	0	0	0
11	FW	(France)	Arthur Yamga	15	4	15	4	0	0
72	FW	(Iran)	Arsalan Motahari	7	1	7	1	0	0
79	MF	(Iran)	Sobhan Khaghani	2	0	2	0	0	0

Last updated: 1 June 2024
Source: Competitions

=== Goals ===
The list is sorted by shirt number when total goals are equal.

Rank	Player	Pro League	Hazfi Cup	Total
1	(Iran) Mehrdad Mohammadi	8	0	8
2	(Argentina) Gustavo Blanco	6	0	6
3	(France) Arthur Yamga	4	0	4
3	(Iran) Armin Sohrabian	4	0	4
4	(Iran) Arman Ramezani	3	0	3
5	(Iran) Mohammad Hossein Moradmand	2	0	2
5	(Iran) Iman Salimi	2	0	2
5	(Uzbekistan) Jaloliddin Masharipov	2	0	2
5	(Iran) Rouzbeh Cheshmi	2	0	2
6	(Iran) Saleh Hardani	1	0	1
6	(Iran) Rouzbeh Cheshmi	1	0	1
6	(Iran) Peyman Babaei	1	0	1
6	(Iran) Abolfazl Jalali	1	0	1
6	(Iran) Arsalan Motahari	1	0	1
6	(Iran) Arash Rezavand	1	0	1
6	Own goals	1	0	1
Total		40	0	40

Last updated: 1 June 2024.
Source: Competitive matches

=== Clean sheets ===
Rank	Player	Pro League	Hazfi Cup	Total
1	(Iran) Hossein Hosseini	18	0	18
2	(Iran) Mohammad Reza Khaledabadi	1	0	1
Total		19	0	19

Last updated: 1 June 2024.
Source: Competitive matches
