= 2021–22 Esteghlal F.C. season =

Esteghlal F.C.
2021–22 season
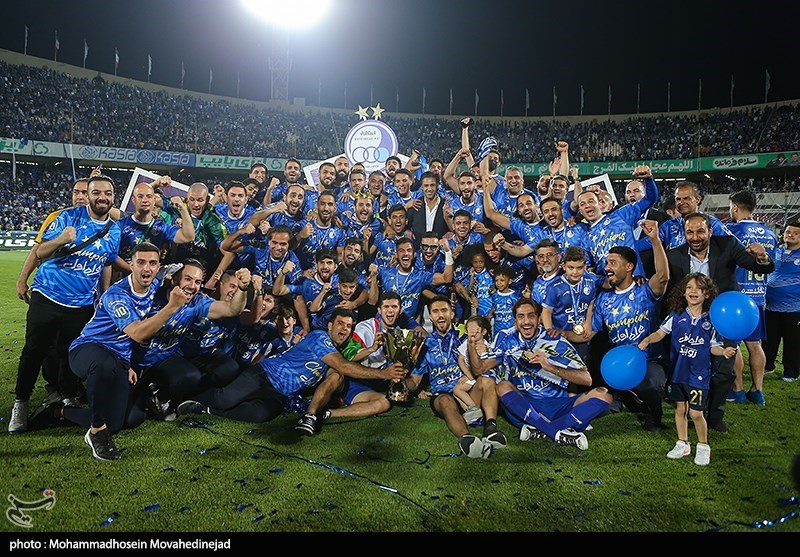
- President: Mostafa Ajorlu
- Head coach: Farhad Majidi
- Stadium: Azadi Stadium
- Pro League: 1st (champions)
- Hazfi Cup: Quarter-final
- AFC Champions League: Round of 16
- Top goalscorer: League: Arthur Yamga (10); All: Arthur Yamga (10)
- Highest home attendance: 75,000
- Lowest home attendance: 0 (spectator ban)
- Average home league attendance: 28,400 (matches with spectator bans not included)
Home colours	Away colours
- All statistics correct as of 1 June 2022.

The 2021–22 Esteghlal Football Club season was the club's 76th season in existence and the 28th consecutive season in the top flight of Iranian football. In addition to the domestic league, Esteghlal participated in this season's editions of the Hazfi Cup, and the AFC Champions League (2021). The club will not compete in the AFC Champions League (2022) after failing to obtain an AFC license. The season covered the period from 13 September 2021 to 30 May 2022.

== Players ==
=== Squad information ===
Last updated: 7 March 2022

No.	Name	Nat	Position	Date of Birth (Age)	Since	End	Signed from
Goalkeepers
1	Hossein Hosseini	(Iran)	GK	30 June 1992 (aged 29)	2012	2023	(Iran) Youth Sector
90	Sina Saeidifar	(Iran)	GK	12 April 2001 (aged 20)	2020	2024	(Iran) Youth Sector
98	Alireza Rezaei	(Iran)	GK	11 December 1999 (aged 22)	2021	2023	(Iran) Paykan
Defenders
2	Saleh Hardani	(Iran)	RB / RM	14 September 1998 (aged 23)	2022	2024	(Iran) Foolad
5	Aref Gholami	(Iran)	CB / RB	19 April 1997 (aged 24)	2019	2022	(Iran) Foolad
21	Vouria Ghafouri	(Iran)	RB / RW	20 September 1987 (aged 34)	2016	2022	(Iran) Sepahan
44	Mohammad Javad Behafarin	(Iran)	CB	26 July 1999 (aged 22)	2020	2025	(Iran) Youth Sector
55	Raphael Silva	(Brazil)	CB	20 April 1992 (aged 29)	2022	2022	(Saudi Arabia) Al Faisaly
59	Abolfazl Jalali	(Iran)	LB / LW	26 June 1998 (aged 23)	2021	2023	(Iran) Saipa
70	Mohammad Daneshgar	(Iran)	CB / RB	20 January 1994 (aged 27)	2018	2023	(Iran) Saipa
Midfielders
6	Rouzbeh Cheshmi	(Iran)	CB / DM / CM	24 July 1993 (aged 28)	2021	2023	(Qatar) Umm Salal
8	Saeid Mehri	(Iran)	CM / AM / DM	16 September 1995 (aged 26)	2021	2023	(Iran) Tractor
9	Mehdi Mehdipour	(Iran)	CM / DM / AM	18 February 1994 (aged 27)	2020	2023	(Iran) Zob Ahan
14	Zobeir Niknafs	(Iran)	DM / CM	12 April 1993 (aged 28)	2021	2023	(Iran) Foolad
17	Jafar Salmani	(Iran)	LW / LB	12 January 1997 (aged 24)	2021	2023	(Portugal) Portimonense
29	Amirali Sadeghi	(Iran)	LW / AM	9 February 2001 (aged 20)	2021	2024	(Iran) Saipa
30	Azizbek Amonov	(Uzbekistan)	LM / AM	30 October 1997 (aged 24)	2022	2024	(Uzbekistan) Lokomotiv
77	Reza Azari	(Iran)	DM / CM / AM	10 February 1998 (aged 23)	2018	2023	(Iran) Youth Sector
79	Sobhan Khaghani	(Iran)	RW / RB	27 January 2000 (aged 21)	2020	2026	(Iran) Tractor
Forwards
11	Arthur Yamga	(France)	RW / CF / RB	7 September 1996 (aged 25)	2021	2023	(Denmark) Vejle
23	Arman Ramezani	(Iran)	CF	22 June 1992 (aged 29)	2021	2022	(Iran) Persepolis
39	Rudy Gestede	(Benin)	CF / SS / RW / LW	10 October 1988 (aged 33)	2021	2023	(Greece) Panetolikos
72	Amir Arsalan Motahari	(Iran)	CF / RW	10 March 1993 (aged 28)	2020	2023	(Iran) Zob Ahan
99	Amirhossein Hosseinzadeh	(Iran)	LW / SS / AM	3 October 2000 (aged 21)	2021	2023	(Iran) Saipa
Players transferred during the season
3	Mohammad Hossein Moradmand	(Iran)	CB	22 June 1993 (aged 28)	2020	2022	(Iran) Shahr Khodro
4	Siavash Yazdani	(Iran)	CB	2 March 1992 (aged 29)	2019	2023	(Iran) Sepahan
7	Arash Rezavand	(Iran)	CM / DM / AM	5 October 1993 (aged 28)	2019	2023	(Iran) Saipa
10	Amin Ghaseminejad	(Iran)	CF / AM / LW / RW	22 November 1986 (aged 35)	2021	2023	(Iran) Shahr Khodro
12	Mohammad Rashid Mazaheri	(Iran)	GK	18 May 1989 (aged 32)	2020	2023	(Iran) Tractor
16	Mohammad Reza Azadi	(Iran)	CF	7 December 1999 (aged 22)	2021	2023	(Greece) Panetolikos
22	Babak Moradi	(Iran)	RW / LW / LB	29 July 1993 (aged 28)	2020	2024	(Iran) Machine Sazi
27	Matin Karimzadeh	(Iran)	LB / LM	1 July 1998 (aged 23)	2020	2023	(Iran) Pars Jonoubi
33	Aref Aghasi	(Iran)	CB	2 January 1997 (aged 24)	2021	2023	(Iran) Foolad
42	Fardin Rabet	(Iran)	RW / LW	29 October 2001 (aged 20)	2020	2025	(Iran) Youth Sector

== Transfers ==
=== In ===
Date	Pos.	Player	From	Type	Ref.
10 August 2021	MF	(Iran) Reza Azari	Machine Sazi	End of loan	
10 August 2021	DF	(Iran) Mohammad Javad Behafarin	Chooka Talesh	End of loan	
21 August 2021	MF	(Iran) Amir Hossein Hosseinzadeh	Saipa	Transfer	
21 August 2021	MF	(Iran) Zobeir Niknafs	Foolad	Transfer	
22 August 2021	DF	(Iran) Aref Aghasi	Foolad	Transfer	
22 August 2021	GK	(Iran) Alireza Rezaei	Paykan	Transfer	
23 August 2021	FW	(Iran) Mohammad Reza Azadi	(Greece) Panetolikos	Transfer	
26 August 2021	FW	(Iran) Amin Ghaseminejad	Shahr Khodro	Transfer	
30 August 2021	DF	(Iran) Jafar Salmani	(Portugal) Portimonense	Transfer	
31 August 2021	DF	(Iran) Abolfazl Jalali	Saipa	Transfer	
29 September 2021	MF	(Iran) Amirali Sadeghi	Saipa	Transfer	
10 October 2021	MF	(Iran) Rouzbeh Cheshmi	(Qatar) Umm Salal	Transfer	
15 October 2021	DF	(France) Arthur Yamga	(Denmark) Vejle	Transfer	
30 October 2021	FW	(Benin) Rudy Gestede	(Greece) Panetolikos	Transfer	
5 February 2022	DF	(Iran) Saleh Hardani	Foolad	Transfer	
5 February 2022	MF	(Uzbekistan) Azizbek Amonov	(Uzbekistan) Lokomotiv	Transfer	
7 March 2022	DF	(Brazil) Raphael Silva	(Saudi Arabia) Al Faisaly	Transfer	

=== Out ===
Date	Pos.	Player	To	Type	Ref.
10 August 2021	GK	(Iran) Amirhossein Bayat	Released		
10 August 2021	FW	(Iran) Erfan Golmohammadi	Nassaji	End of loan	
10 August 2021	DF	(Croatia) Hrvoje Milić	Unattached	End of contract	
12 August 2021	DF	(Iran) Mohammad Naderi	(Turkey) Altay	End of contract	
23 August 2021	FW	(Iran) Mehdi Ghayedi	(United Arab Emirates) Shabab Al-Ahli	Transfer	
28 August 2021	MF	(Iran) Masoud Rigi	Sepahan	End of contract	
9 September 2021	MF	(Iran) Farhad Zavoshi	Havadar	Transfer	
13 September 2021	DF	(Iran) Reza Gordan	Havadar	Transfer	
17 September 2021	FW	(Mali) Cheick Diabaté	(Qatar) Al-Gharafa	End of contract	
25 September 2021	DF	(Iran) Amirhossein Asudeh	Nirooye Zamini	Transfer	
26 September 2021	GK	(Iran) Hossein Pour Hamidi	Aluminium Arak	Transfer	
28 September 2021	FW	(Iran) Mohammad Bolboli	Naft MIS	Transfer	
29 September 2021	DF	(Iran) Arash Dajliri	Havadar	Loan	
29 September 2021	MF	(Iran) Amir Hossein Khodamoradi	Havadar	Transfer	
29 September 2021	FW	(Iran) Mohammad Hossein Fallah	Paykan	Transfer	
30 September 2021	FW	(Iran) Pouria Bali Lashak	Saipa	Transfer	
1 October 2021	FW	(Iran) Mohammad Hossein Alipour	Mes Shahr-e Babak	Transfer	
6 October 2021	MF	(Iran) Farshid Esmaeili	(Qatar) Al-Arabi	End of contract	
10 October 2021	FW	(Iran) Sajjad Aghaei	Aluminium Arak	Transfer	
15 October 2021	MF	(Iran) Sina Khadempour	Naft MIS	Loan	
2 November 2021	MF	(Iran) Dariush Shojaeian	Havadar	End of contract	
7 November 2021	DF	(Iran) Ahmad Mousavi	Gol Gohar	Transfer	
30 January 2022	MF	(Iran) Babak Moradi	Havadar	Transfer	
31 January 2022	MF	(Iran) Fardin Rabet	Shahr Khodro	Loan	
4 February 2022	MF	(Iran) Arash Rezavand	Foolad	Loan	
4 February 2022	DF	(Iran) Aref Aghasi	Foolad	Transfer	
5 February 2022	GK	(Iran) Mohammad Rashid Mazaheri	Sepahan	Transfer	
5 February 2022	DF	(Iran) Matin Karimzadeh	Nassaji	Loan	
12 February 2022	FW	(Iran) Amin Ghaseminejad	Gol Gohar	Loan	
13 February 2022	FW	(Iran) Fardin Najafi	Shahin Bushehr	Transfer	
14 February 2022	FW	(Iran) Mohammad Reza Azadi	Aluminium Arak	Transfer	
6 March 2022	DF	(Iran) Mohammad Hossein Moradmand	Malavan	Loan	
6 March 2022	DF	(Iran) Siavash Yazdani	Malavan	Loan	

== Pre-season and friendlies ==
2 September 2021 1	Esteghlal	2–0	Esteghlal U21	Tehran
	Hosseinzadeh 3'; Ramezani 17'; Motahari (penalty missed) 78'	Report		Stadium: Enghelab Sport Complex

7 September 2021 2	Regional F.C. (United Arab Emirates)	1–7	(Iran) Esteghlal	Dubai, United Arab Emirates
	? 43'	Report	Khaghani 8'; Moradmand 30', 45'; Hosseinzadeh 38'; Mousavi 51'; Azadi 84'; Rabet 87'	Stadium: Police Officers' Club Stadium

5 October 2021 3	Esteghlal	2–1	Kheybar Khorramabad	Tehran
15:00 IRST (UTC+03:30)	Motahari 38' (pen.); Rabet 90'	Report	Gharibi 70'	Stadium: Kheirieh Stadium

9 October 2021 4	Esteghlal	2–2	Paykan	Tehran
15:45 IRST (UTC+03:30)	Motahari 43'; Ramezani 77'	Report	Koushki 30' (pen.); Fallah 70'	Stadium: Kheirieh Stadium

15 October 2021 5	Esteghlal	0–1	Team Melli Daneshjouyan	Tehran
14:00 IRST (UTC+03:30)		Report	Ousani 90'

13 November 2021 6	Esteghlal	5–1	Pishgaman Fonoon Pars	Tehran
	Ghaseminejad 25'; Gestede 40'; Daneshgar 42'; Ghafouri 70'; Ramezani 80'	Report	Habibi 22'	Stadium: Ararat Stadium

31 March 2022 7	Esteghlal	6–0	Esteghlal U23	Tehran
	Yamga 18'; Ramezani 64', 80'; Motahari 75', 89'; Azari 85'	Report

21 April 2022 8	Esteghlal	6–1	Esteghlal U23	Tehran
	Ramezani 19'; Ghafouri 21', 39'; Silva 23'; Motahari 37'; Gestede (pen.)	Report	Rezaei 8'

25 April 2022 9	Esteghlal	4–0	Fajr Sepasi	Tehran
	Yamga 58', 10' (pen.); Amonov 71'; Motahari 78'	Report

29 April 2022 10	Esteghlal	1–1	Havadar	Tehran
20:00 IRDT (UTC+04:30)	Yamga 8'	Report	Bagheri 59' (pen.)	Stadium: Shahid Dastgerdi Stadium

== Competitions ==
=== Overview ===
Competition	First match	Last match	Starting round	Final position	Record							
Competition	First match	Last match	Starting round	Final position	Pld	W	D	L	GF	GA	GD	Win %
Pro League	20 October 2021	30 May 2022	Matchday 1	Winners	30	19	11	0	39	10	+29	63.33
Hazfi Cup	19 December 2021	11 April 2022	Round of 32	Quarter-final	3	1	2	0	2	1	+1	33.33
Champions League	13 September 2021		Round of 16	Round of 16	1	0	0	1	0	2	−2	0.00
Total					34	20	13	1	41	13	+28	58.82

Last updated: 1 June 2022.
Source: Competitions

=== Persian Gulf Pro League ===
==== Results summary ====
Overall								Home						Away					
Pld	W	D	L	GF	GA	GD	Pts	W	D	L	GF	GA	GD	W	D	L	GF	GA	GD
30	19	11	0	39	10	+29	68	10	5	0	13	3	+10	9	6	0	26	7	+19

Last updated: 1 June 2022.
Source: Ipl Stats

==== Results by round ====
Round	1	2	3	4	5	6	7	8	9	10	11	12	13	14	15	16	17	18	19	20	21	22	23	24	25	26	27	28	29	30
Ground	H	A	H	A	H	A	A	H	A	H	A	H	A	H	A	A	H	A	H	A	H	H	A	H	A	H	A	H	A	H
Result	W	W	W	D	D	W	D	D	W	W	W	W	D	W	W	W	W	W	W	D	W	W	D	D	D	W	W	D	W	D
Position	4	4	2	1	2	1	2	2	2	2	1	1	1	1	1	1	1	1	1	1	1	1	1	1	1	1	1	1	1	1

Updated to match(es) played on 1 June 2022. Source: "Iran Football League Organization - League Full Table".
A = Away; H = Home; W = Win; D = Draw; L = Loss

==== Matches ====
20 October 2021 1	Esteghlal	1–0	Havadar	Tehran
18:00 IRST (UTC+03:30)	Ghafouri (penalty missed) 56'; Salmani 60'	Report	Haghshenas (yellow card) 54'	Stadium: Azadi Stadium; Attendance: 0 (Note: The match was played behind closed doors due to the COVID-19 pandemic in Iran.); Referee: Kopal Nazemi

25 October 2021 2	Zob Ahan	0–2	Esteghlal	Isfahan
18:00 IRST (UTC+03:30)	Noormohammadi (yellow card) 72'; Ghoreishi (yellow card) 88'	Report	Yamga 27', 90+6'; Rezavand (yellow card) 36'	Stadium: Foolad Shahr Stadium; Attendance: 0 Referee: Hassan Akrami

30 October 2021 3	Esteghlal	1–0	Tractor	Tehran
18:00 IRST (UTC+03:30)	Salmani (yellow card) 9'; Moradmand (yellow card) 43'; Motahari 54'; Ghafouri (yellow card) 69' (penalty missed) 70'; Yamga (yellow card) 84'	Report	Nasseri (yellow card) 24'	Stadium: Azadi Stadium; Attendance: 0 Referee: Seyed Reza Mahdavi

6 November 2021 4	Fajr Sepasi	1–1	Esteghlal	Shiraz
16:00 IRST (UTC+03:30)	Nemati (yellow card) 58'; Masoumi (yellow card) 74'; Ghorbani 90+5' (yellow card) 90+6'	Report	Yamga 60' (pen.) (yellow card) 62'; Daneshgar (yellow card) 64'; Moradmand (yellow card) 87'	Stadium: Hafezieh Stadium; Attendance: 0 Referee: Morteza Mansourian

19 November 2021 5	Esteghlal	0–0	Nassaji	Tehran
18:00 IRST (UTC+03:30)	Moradmand (yellow card) 21'; Daneshgar (yellow card) 38'; Gestede (yellow card) 45+4'	Report	Shiri (yellow card) 58'	Stadium: Azadi Stadium; Attendance: 5,000; Referee: Alireza Faghani

24 November 2021 6	Gol Gohar	0–3	Esteghlal	Sirjan
16:00 IRST (UTC+03:30)	Alizadeh (yellow card) 43'; Zakipour (yellow card) 48'	Report		Stadium: Qasem Soleimani Stadium; Attendance: 0 Referee: Ali Safaei
Note: Esteghlal were awarded a 3–0 win over Gol Gohar on 16 December as a result of Gol Gohar fielding the ineligible player Eric Bocoum during the match. The match had originally ended 0–0 draw.

29 November 2021 7	Sanat Naft	1–1	Esteghlal	Abadan
16:00 IRST (UTC+03:30)	Hanafi 8'; Bakhtiari (yellow card) 65'; Shariatzadeh (yellow card) 84'	Report	Hosseinzadeh 39'	Stadium: Takhti Stadium; Attendance: 0 Referee: Mohammadreza Akbarian

4 December 2021 8	Esteghlal	0–0	Persepolis	Tehran
16:15 IRST (UTC+03:30)	Yamga (yellow card) 68'; Rezavand (yellow card) 77'; Moradmand (yellow card) 90+4'	Report	Kamyabinia (yellow card) 25'; Torabi (yellow card) 63'; Alishah (yellow card) 72'; Aghaei (yellow card) 90+2'	Stadium: Azadi Stadium; Attendance: 0 Referee: Mouood Bonyadifar

9 December 2021 9	Paykan	0–3	Esteghlal	Tehran
16:00 IRST (UTC+03:30)	Norouzifard (yellow card) 7'	Report	Yazdani 31'; Hosseinzadeh (yellow card) 36'; Salmani (yellow card) 71'; Daneshgar 74'; Motahari 84'	Stadium: Shahid Dastgerdi Stadium; Attendance: 0 Referee: Payam Heydari

14 December 2021 10	Esteghlal	1–0	Sepahan	Tehran
16:00 IRST (UTC+03:30)	Salmani 35'; Yazdani (yellow card) 62'; Moradmand (yellow card) 63'	Report	Gvelesiani (yellow card) 75'	Stadium: Azadi Stadium; Attendance: 0 Referee: Bijan Heydari

24 December 2021 11	Shahr Khodro	0–3	Esteghlal	Mashhad
15:00 IRST (UTC+03:30)	Taheran (yellow card) 25'; Kazemayni (yellow card) 70' (yellow-red card) 87'; Sharifi (yellow card) 79'	Report	Salmani 12'; Gestede 23'; Aghasi (yellow card) 36'; Ramezani 44'; Yazdani (yellow card) 57'; Moradmand (yellow card) 81'	Stadium: Samen Stadium; Attendance: 0 Referee: Meysam Heydari

29 December 2021 12	Esteghlal	1–0	Foolad	Tehran
18:00 IRST (UTC+03:30)	Mehdipour 58' (yellow card) 70'; Niknafs (yellow card) 63'; Aghasi (yellow card) 72'; Moradmand (yellow card) 77'	Report	Pereira (yellow card) 44'; Shah Abbasi (red card) 84'; Mousavi (yellow card) 90+2'	Stadium: Azadi Stadium; Attendance: 0 Referee: Amir Arab Baraghi

3 January 2022 13	Aluminium Arak	1–1	Esteghlal	Arak
15:00 IRST (UTC+03:30)	Pour Hamidi (yellow card) 15'; Sharifat (yellow card) 67'; Soleimanzadeh (yellow card) 70'; Majidi 90+2'; Aghaei (yellow card) 90+4'	Report	Mehdipour 58'; Niknafs (yellow card) 28'; Daneshgar (yellow card) 33'; Hosseinzadeh (yellow card) 58'; Hosseini (yellow card) 62'; Gestede (yellow card) 70'; Aghasi (yellow card) 76'	Stadium: Imam Khomeini Stadium; Attendance: 0 Referee: Ashkan Korshidi

8 January 2022 14	Esteghlal	3–2	Mes Rafsanjan	Tehran
17:00 IRST (UTC+03:30)	Yamga 9' (pen.), 61' (pen.); Ghaseminejad 87'; Cheshmi (yellow card) 90+1'; Mehdipour (yellow card) 90+3'; Daneshgar (yellow card) 90+3'	Report	Mensha 35' (pen.); Soleimani 87'	Stadium: Azadi Stadium; Attendance: 0 Referee: Mohammad Hossein Torabian

13 January 2022 15	Naft MIS	0–3	Esteghlal	Masjed Soleyman
15:00 IRST (UTC+03:30)	Mojademi (yellow card) 42'; Bolboli (yellow card) 53'; Bagheri (yellow card) 59'; Khadempour (yellow card) 71'	Report	Hosseinzadeh 16', 52'; Yamga (yellow card) 45' (goal) 58'	Stadium: Behnam Mohammadi Stadium; Attendance: 0 Referee: Hamid Haj-Malek

4 February 2022 16	Havadar	1–2	Esteghlal	Karaj
17:00 IRST (UTC+03:30)	Shojaeian (yellow card) 9'; Mohammadi 39'; Abbasian (yellow card) 45'	Report	Gestede 11' (pen.); Niknafs (yellow card) 14'; Motahari 84'; Yazdani (yellow card) 68' (yellow-red card) 87'	Stadium: Enghelab Stadium; Attendance: 0 Referee: Seyyed Asghar Momeni
Note: The match was originally scheduled to take place on January 22, but was postponed due to the positive COVID-19 test of some Esteghlal members.

13 February 2022 17	Esteghlal	1–0	Zob Ahan	Tehran
19:10 IRST (UTC+03:30)	Yamga 54'; Niknafs (yellow card) 62'; Daneshgar (yellow card) 72'	Report	Noormohammadi (yellow card) 36'; Darvishi (yellow card) 65'	Stadium: Azadi Stadium; Attendance: 0

18 February 2022 18	Tractor	0–1	Esteghlal	Tabriz
17:30 IRST (UTC+03:30)		Report	Hosseinzadeh 70'; Mehri (yellow card) 87'	Stadium: Shahid Qasem Soleimani Stadium; Attendance: 0 Referee: Mouood Bonyadifar

23 February 2022 19	Esteghlal	1–0	Fajr Sepasi	Tehran
19:00 IRST (UTC+03:30)	Cheshmi (yellow card) 35'; Gestede (yellow card) 43'; Salmani 54'	Report	Kordestani (yellow card) 38'; R. Aliyari (yellow card) 67'; Dana (yellow card) 75'	Stadium: Azadi Stadium; Attendance: 0 Referee: Reza Adel

28 February 2022 20	Nassaji	0–0	Esteghlal	Mashhad
17:00 IRST (UTC+03:30)	Karimzadeh (yellow card) 23'; Shojaei (yellow card) 33'	Report		Stadium: Imam Reza Stadium; Attendance: 0 Referee: Ali Safaei

6 March 2022 21	Esteghlal	2–1	Gol Gohar	Tehran
17:30 IRST (UTC+03:30)	Amonov (yellow card) 16'; Cheshmi (yellow card) 16'; Yamga (penalty missed) 45+5 45+5', 89' (pen.); Mehri (yellow card) 49'	Report	Alizadeh (yellow card) 16'; Sadeghi (penalty missed) 43; Khanzadeh (yellow card) 45'; Forouzan (yellow card) 45+3'; Tabrizi 54'; Mosleh (yellow card) 78'	Stadium: Azadi Stadium; Attendance: 0 Referee: Bijan Heydari

11 March 2022 22	Esteghlal	1–0	Sanat Naft	Tehran
20:00 IRST (UTC+03:30)	Hosseinzadeh 32'	Report		Stadium: Azadi Stadium; Attendance: 0 Referee: Ashkan Khorshidi

17 March 2022 23	Persepolis	1–1	Esteghlal	Tehran
17:30 IRST (UTC+03:30)	Temirov (yellow card) 16'; Faraji (yellow card) 22'; Nemati 40'; Aghaei (yellow card) 67'; Rezaeian (yellow card) 68'	Report	Gestede 81'; Niknafs (yellow card) 87'; Hosseini (yellow card) 90+2'	Stadium: Azadi Stadium; Attendance: 20,000; Referee: Seyyed Mehdi Seyyad Ali

5 April 2022 24	Esteghlal	0–0	Paykan	Tehran
20:45 IRDT (UTC+04:30)	Silva (red card) 41'	Report	Norouzifard (yellow card) 53'	Stadium: Azadi Stadium; Attendance: 20,000; Referee: Seyyed Reza Mahdavi

4 May 2022 25	Sepahan	1–1	Esteghlal	Isfahan
18:30 IRDT (UTC+04:30)	Gvelesiani 14' (pen.) (yellow card) 81'; Alimohammadi (yellow card) 39'; Moghanlou (yellow card) 60'; Karimi (yellow card) 63'; Ahmadzadeh (yellow card) 82'	Report	Daneshgar 6'; Hosseini (yellow card) 11'	Stadium: Naghsh-e-Jahan; Attendance: 20,000; Referee: Mouood Bonyadifar

9 May 2022 26	Esteghlal	1–0	Shahr Khodro	Tehran
20:40 IRDT (UTC+04:30)	Niknafs (yellow card) 46'; Gestede (yellow card) 75'; Ramezani 88'; Daneshgar (yellow card) 90'; Rezaei (yellow card) 90+4'	Report	Heydari (yellow card) 75'; Nemati (yellow card) 79'	Stadium: Azadi Stadium; Attendance: 40,000; Referee: Hassan Akrami

14 May 2022 27	Foolad	1–2	Esteghlal	Ahvaz
19:45 IRDT (UTC+04:30)	Abshak; (yellow card) 66': Ansari; (yellow card) 80': Koushki; 90+3'	Report	Niknafs; (yellow card) 26': Hosseinzadeh; 53' (yellow card) 72': Hardani; 73': Daneshgar; (yellow card) 90+1': Hosseini; (yellow card) 90+6'	Stadium: Foolad Arena; Attendance: 0 Referee: Mohammad Hossein Zahedifard

19 May 2022 28	Esteghlal	0–0	Aluminium Arak	Tehran
21:15 IRDT (UTC+04:30)		Report	Ahmadi (yellow card) 65'; Pour Hamidi (yellow card) 90+4'; Aghaei (yellow card) 90+5'	Stadium: Azadi Stadium; Attendance: 37,000; Referee: Javad Rahimzadeh

24 May 2022 29	Mes Rafsanjan	0–2	Esteghlal	Rafsanjan
20:00 IRDT (UTC+04:30)		Report	Hosseinzadeh; 48', 54': Ramezani (yellow card) 54'; Silva (yellow card) 70'; Daneshgar (yellow card) 30' (yellow-red card) 80'; Mehdipour (yellow card) 90+4'	Stadium: Shohadaye Mes Rafsanjan Stadium; Attendance: 1,000; Referee: Ahmad Mohammadi

30 May 2022 30	Esteghlal	0–0	Naft MIS	Tehran
19:00 IRDT (UTC+04:30)	Silva (yellow card) 19'; Jalali (yellow card) 81'	Report	Moghtadaei (yellow card) 81'	Stadium: Azadi Stadium; Attendance: 75,000; Referee: Amir Saman Soltani

==== Score overview ====
Win Draw Loss

Opposition	Home score	Away score	Aggregate score	Double
Aluminium	0–0	1–1	1–1	No
Fajr Sepasi	1–0	1–1	2–1	No
Foolad	1–0	2–1	3–1	Yes
Gol Gohar	2–1	3–0	5–1	Yes
Havadar	1–0	2–1	3–1	Yes
Mes Rafsanjan	3–2	2–0	5–2	Yes
Naft MIS	0–0	3–0	3–0	No
Nassaji	0–0	0–0	0–0	No
Paykan	0–0	3–0	3-0	No
Persepolis	0–0	1–1	1–1	No
Sanat Naft	1–0	1–1	2–1	No
Sepahan	1–0	1–1	2–1	No
Shahr Khodro	1–0	3–0	4–0	Yes
Tractor	1–0	1–0	2–0	Yes
Zob Ahan	1–0	2–0	3–0	Yes

=== Hazfi Cup ===
19 December 2021 Round of 32	Esteghlal	1–1 (a.e.t.) (4–2 p)	Navad Urmia	Tehran
17:30 IRST	Rezavand (yellow card) 56'; Ramezani 88'	Report	Mansouri (yellow card) 45'; Terjerou 59'; Safarzadeh (yellow card) 76'; Rostamizad (yellow card) 89'; Soleimani (yellow card) 93'	Stadium: Azadi Stadium; Attendance: 0 Referee: Keyvan Alimohammadi
	Penalties
	Azadi (penalty scored); Mehri (penalty missed); Moradi (penalty scored); Sadeghi (penalty scored); Rezavand (penalty scored)		Soleimani (penalty scored); Fallah (penalty missed); Marabi (penalty scored); Taftian (penalty missed)

8 February 2022 Round of 16	Paykan	0–1 (a.e.t.)	Esteghlal	Tehran
17:00 IRST	Babaei (yellow card) 22'; Sabet-Imani (yellow card) 67'; Fallah (yellow card) 76'	Report	Mehdipour (yellow card) 40'; Motahari 92' (yellow card) 113'	Stadium: Shahid Dastgerdi Stadium; Attendance: 0
Note: The match was originally scheduled to take place on January 18, but was postponed due to the positive COVID-19 test of some Esteghlal members.

11 April 2022 Quarter Finals	Esteghlal	0–0 (a.e.t.) (4–5 p)	Nassaji	Tehran
20:30 IRDT (UTC+04:30)	Amonov (yellow card) 93'; Silva (yellow card) 105'; Daneshgar (yellow card) 113'; Ghafouri (yellow card) 118'	Report	Mansouri (yellow card) 4'	Stadium: Azadi Stadium; Attendance: 40,000; Referee: Amir Arab Baraghi
	Penalties
	Yamga (penalty scored); Gestede (penalty scored); Mehdipour (penalty scored); Amonov (penalty missed); Ramezani (penalty scored)		Kalantari (penalty scored); Abdi (penalty scored); Gholamalibeygi (penalty scored); Nazari (penalty scored); Shiri (penalty scored)

=== AFC Champions League ===
==== Knockout stage ====
13 September 2021 Round of 16	Esteghlal (Iran)	0–2	(Saudi Arabia) Al-Hilal	Dubai, United Arab Emirates
21:00 UTC+4		Live Report; Stats Report	Gomis 39'; Al-Dawsari 56'	Stadium: Zabeel Stadium; Attendance: 0 Referee: Fu Ming (China)

== Statistics ==
=== Squad statistics ===
No.	Pos	Nat	Player	Total		Pro League		Hazfi Cup		Champions League	
No.	Pos	Nat	Player	Apps	Goals	Apps	Goals	Apps	Goals	Apps	Goals
1	GK	(Iran)	Hossein Hosseini	27	0	26	0	0	0	1	0
2	DF	(Iran)	Saleh Hardani	15	1	14	1	1	0	0	0
5	DF	(Iran)	Aref Gholami	13	0	12	0	1	0	0	0
6	MF	(Iran)	Rouzbeh Cheshmi	22	0	19	0	3	0	0	0
8	MF	(Iran)	Saeid Mehri	12	0	11	0	1	0	0	0
9	MF	(Iran)	Mehdi Mehdipour	33	1	30	1	2	0	1	0
11	FW	(France)	Arthur Yamga	29	10	27	10	2	0	0	0
14	MF	(Iran)	Zobeir Niknafs	27	0	23	0	3	0	1	0
17	MF	(Iran)	Jafar Salmani	33	4	30	4	2	0	1	0
21	DF	(Iran)	Vouria Ghafouri	23	0	20	0	2	0	1	0
23	FW	(Iran)	Arman Ramezani	20	3	16	2	3	1	1	0
29	MF	(Iran)	Amirali Sadeghi	10	0	9	0	1	0	0	0
30	MF	(Uzbekistan)	Azizbek Amonov	12	0	11	0	1	0	0	0
39	FW	(Benin)	Rudy Gestede	25	3	23	3	2	0	0	0
55	DF	(Brazil)	Raphael Silva	9	0	8	0	1	0	0	0
59	DF	(Iran)	Abolfazl Jalali	12	0	10	0	2	0	0	0
70	DF	(Iran)	Mohammad Daneshgar	25	2	23	2	2	0	0	0
72	FW	(Iran)	Arsalan Motahari	29	4	26	3	2	1	1	0
77	MF	(Iran)	Reza Azari	8	0	6	0	2	0	0	0
79	MF	(Iran)	Sobhan Khaghani	17	0	13	0	3	0	1	0
98	GK	(Iran)	Alireza Rezaei	7	0	4	0	3	0	0	0
99	FW	(Iran)	Amirhossein Hosseinzadeh	33	8	30	8	2	0	1	0
Players transferred/loaned out during the season
3	DF	(Iran)	Mohammad Hossein Moradmand	17	0	15	0	1	0	1	0
4	DF	(Iran)	Siavash Yazdani	19	1	17	1	1	0	1	0
7	MF	(Iran)	Arash Rezavand	13	0	11	0	1	0	1	0
10	FW	(Iran)	Amin Ghaseminejad	12	1	10	1	1	0	1	0
12	GK	(Iran)	Rashid Mazaheri	1	0	1	0	0	0	0	0
16	FW	(Iran)	Mohammad Reza Azadi	4	0	3	0	1	0	0	0
22	MF	(Iran)	Babak Moradi	3	0	1	0	1	0	1	0
27	DF	(Iran)	Matin Karimzadeh	3	0	1	0	1	0	1	0
33	DF	(Iran)	Aref Aghasi	10	0	8	0	1	0	1	0

Last updated: 5 June 2022
Source: Competitions

=== Goals ===
The list is sorted by shirt number when total goals are equal.

Rank	Player	Pro League	Hazfi Cup	Champions League	Total
1	(France) Arthur Yamga	10	0	0	10
2	(Iran) Amirhossein Hosseinzadeh	8	0	0	8
4	(Iran) Jafar Salmani	4	0	0	4
4	(Iran) Arsalan Motahari	3	1	0	4
5	(Iran) Arman Ramezani	2	1	0	3
5	(Benin) Rudy Gestede	3	0	0	3
7	(Iran) Mohammad Daneshgar	2	0	0	2
8	(Iran) Saleh Hardani	1	0	0	1
8	(Iran) Siavash Yazdani	1	0	0	1
8	(Iran) Mehdi Mehdipour	1	0	0	1
8	(Iran) Amin Ghaseminejad	1	0	0	1
Own goals		0	0	0	0
Total		36	2	0	38

Last updated: 1 June 2022.
Source: Competitive matches

=== Clean sheets ===
Rank	Player	Pro League	Hazfi Cup	Champions League	Total
1	(Iran) Hossein Hosseini	18	0	0	18
2	(Iran) Alireza Rezaei	3	2	0	5
3	(Iran) Mohammad Rashid Mazaheri	1	0	0	1
Total		22	2	0	24

Last updated: 1 June 2022.
Source: Competitive matches

=== Assists Goal ===
The list is sorted by shirt number when total Assists Goal are equal.

Rank	Player	Pro League	Hazfi Cup	Champions League	Total
1	(Iran) Mehdi Mehdipour	7	0	0	7
2	(France) Arthur Yamga	3	0	0	3
2	(Iran) Jafar Salmani	2	1	0	3
4	(Iran) Saleh Hardani	2	0	0	2
4	(Iran) Zobeir Niknafs	1	1	0	2
4	(Benin) Rudy Gestede	2	0	0	2
7	(Iran) Siavash Yazdani	1	0	0	1
7	(Iran) Arash Rezavand	1	0	0	1
7	(Iran) Vouria Ghafouri	1	0	0	1
7	(Iran) Amirali Sadeghi	1	0	0	1
7	(Brazil) Raphael Silva	1	0	0	1
7	(Iran) Arsalan Motahari	1	0	0	1
7	(Iran) Amirhossein Hosseinzadeh	1	0	0	1
Total		24	2	0	26

Last updated: 1 June 2022.
Source: Competitive matches

=== Disciplinary record ===
Includes all competitive matches. Players with 1 card or more are included only.

N	P	Nat.	Name	Pro League			Hazfi Cup			Champions League			Total			Notes
N	P	Nat.	Name	Yellow card	Second yellow card	Red card	Yellow card	Second yellow card	Red card	Yellow card	Second yellow card	Red card	Yellow card	Second yellow card	Red card	Notes
1	GK	(Iran)	Hossein Hosseini	4									4			
3	DF	(Iran)	Mohammad Hossein Moradmand	7						1			8			
4	DF	(Iran)	Siavash Yazdani	2	1								2	1		
6	MF	(Iran)	Rouzbeh Cheshmi	3									3			
7	MF	(Iran)	Arash Rezavand	2			1						3			
8	MF	(Iran)	Saeid Mehri	2									2			
9	MF	(Iran)	Mehdi Mehdipour	3			1						4			
11	FW	(France)	Arthur Yamga	4									4			
14	MF	(Iran)	Zobeir Niknafs	7									7			
17	MF	(Iran)	Jafar Salmani	2									2			
21	DF	(Iran)	Voria Ghafouri	1			1						2			
23	FW	(Iran)	Arman Ramezani	2									2			
30	MF	(Uzbekistan)	Azizbek Amonov	1			1						2			
33	DF	(Iran)	Aref Aghasi	3									3			
39	FW	(Benin)	Rudy Gestede	4									4			
55	DF	(Brazil)	Raphael Silva	2		1	1						3		1	
59	DF	(Iran)	Abolfazl Jalali	1									1			
70	DF	(Iran)	Mohammad Daneshgar	7	1		1						8	1		
72	FW	(Iran)	Arsalan Motahari				1						1			
99	MF	(Iran)	Amirhossein Hosseinzadeh	3									3			

Last updated: 1 June 2022
Source: Scoreway
Only competitive matches
(yellow card) = Number of bookings; (second yellow card) = Number of sending offs after a second yellow card; (red card) = Number of sending offs by a direct red card.
