= Amir Hossein Nemati =

Iranian footballer (born 1996)

Personal information
- Full name: Amir Hossein Nemati
- Date of birth: June 16, 1996 (age 30)
- Place of birth: Tehran, Iran
- Height: 1.98 m (6 ft 6 in)
- Position: Center back

Team information
- Current team: Nakhon Pathom United
- Number: 44

Youth career
- 2015–2018: Esteghlal
- 2018: Arash Rey
- 2018: Vista Turbine

Senior career*
Years	Team	Apps	(Gls)
2018–2019	Sardar Bukan	1	(0)
2020–2022	Padideh	25	(1)
2025–	Nakhon Pathom United	11	(1)
- * Club domestic league appearances and goals as of 30 April 2025

Amir Hossein Nemati (Persian: امیرحسین نعمتی; born June 16, 1996, in Tehran) is an Iranian footballer who plays as a defender for Nakhon Pathom United in Thai League 1.

== Club career ==
=== Padideh ===
He made his debut for Padideh in 16th fixtures of 2020–21 Persian Gulf Pro League against Machine Sazi while he substituted in for Hossein Mehraban.
