= Ghasem Gerami =

Iranian footballer

Personal information
- Full name: Ghasem Gerami Zeydi
- Date of birth: 15 September 1992 (age 34)
- Place of birth: Sari, Iran
- Position: Midfielder

Team information
- Current team: Sardar Bukan

Youth career
- Padideh Sari
- Shahin Tehran
- –2012: Steel Azin
- 2012–2013: Persepolis

Senior career*
Years	Team	Apps	(Gls)
2013–2014	Khoneh Be Khoneh		
2014	Saba Qom	4	(0)
2016–	Sardar Bukan	0	(0)
- * Club domestic league appearances and goals as of 10 December 2014

Ghasem Gerami (Persian: قاسم گرامی); is an Iranian football midfielder who currently plays for Sardar Bukan in the Iranian League 2.

== Club career ==
=== Early years ===
Gerami started his career with Padideh Sari. He spent a few seasons with Shahin Tehran, Steel Azin and Persepolis Academies. In summer 2013 he joined Khoneh Be Khoneh and helped them in promoting to 2014–15 Iran Football's 2nd Division.

=== Saba Qom ===
He joined Saba Qom on 2 June 2014 with a 3-year contract. He made his debut against Persepolis on 30 August 2014 as a substitute for Ahmad Hassanzadeh.

== Club career statistics ==
As of 10 December 2014

Club	Division	Season	League		Hazfi Cup		Asia		Total	
Club	Division	Season	Apps	Goals	Apps	Goals	Apps	Goals	Apps	Goals
Saba Qom	Pro League	2014–15	4	0	1	0	–	–	5	0
Career Totals			4	0	1	0	0	0	5	0
