= Azizbek Amonov =

Uzbek footballer

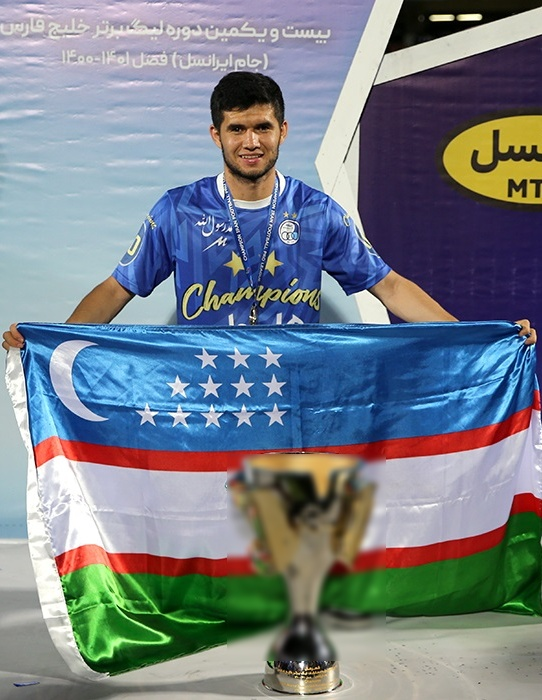
- Amonov with Esteghlal FC in 2022

Personal information
- Full name: Azizbek Askarovich Amonov
- Date of birth: 30 October 1997 (age 29)
- Place of birth: Zarafshan, Uzbekistan
- Height: 1.74 m (5 ft 9 in)
- Position: Midfielder

Team information
- Current team: Dinamo Samarqand
- Number: 8

Youth career
- 2016–2017: Lokomotiv

Senior career*
Years	Team	Apps	(Gls)
2017–2022	Lokomotiv	66	(11)
2020	→ Buxoro (loan)	13	(0)
2022–2023	Esteghlal	12	(0)
2023	Nasaf	26	(3)
2024	Khor Fakkan	13	(2)
2024	Neftchi Fergana	12	(2)
2025	Bunyodkor	11	(0)
2025	Buxoro	18	(0)
2026–	Dinamo Samarqand	12	(4)

International career^{‡}
2017	Uzbekistan U20	2	(0)
2018–2020	Uzbekistan U23	5	(1)
2021–	Uzbekistan	12	(2)
- * Club domestic league appearances and goals as of 28 July 2026 ‡ National team caps and goals as of 19 June 2026

Azizbek Asqarovich Amonov (Uzbek Cyrillic: Азизбек Аскарович Аманов; born 30 October 1997) is an Uzbek footballer who plays as a midfielder for Dinamo Samarqand and the Uzbekistan national team.

== Club career ==
Amonov is a graduate of the Lokomotiv Tashkent football academy. On 30 June 2017, he made his professional debut in the Uzbek League, featuring in Lokomotiv's 3–1 victory over Metallurg Bekabad.

In 2020, he played for Buxoro on loan.

On 4 February 2022, Amonov signed a two-and-a-half-year contract with Iranian club Esteghlal. During his time at the club, he spent one season with the team and helped them win the national championship.

On 10 February 2023, Amonov signed for Nasaf Qarshi. He subsequently joined Khor Fakkan, a club competing in the UAE Pro League. The transfer fee and contract duration were not disclosed. He played for the Emirati club during the second half of the 2023–24 season.

On 10 January 2025, Amonov signed for Bunyodkor. Later that year, on 22 July, he joined Buxoro.

On 1 January 2026, Amonov joined Dinamo Samarqand ahead of the 2026 season. The Samarkand-based club announced his signing to strengthen its attacking options. The duration of the contract was not specified in the official announcement.

== International career ==
Amonov made his debut for the Uzbekistan national team on 5 September 2021 in a friendly match against Sweden, which Uzbekistan lost 2–1. He came on as a substitute for Odiljon Hamrobekov in the 89th minute.

Amonov was included in Uzbekistan's squad for the 2023 AFC Asian Cup in Qatar, but remained an unused substitute in all of the team's matches.

On 2 June 2026, Amonov was named by Fabio Cannavaro in Uzbekistan's 26-man squad for the 2026 FIFA World Cup, held in Canada, Mexico, and the United States. The tournament marked Uzbekistan's first appearance at the World Cup.

== Career Statistics ==
=== Club ===
As of match played 27 May 2024

Appearances and goals by club, season and competition
Club	Season	League			National cup (Note: Includes Uzbekistan Cup, Hazfi Cup)		Continental		Other		Total	
Club	Season	Division	Apps	Goals	Apps	Goals	Apps	Goals	Apps	Goals	Apps	Goals
Lokomotiv	2017	Uzbekistan Super League	11	1	3	1	0	0	–		14	2
Lokomotiv	2018	Uzbekistan Super League	13	1	2	0	0	0	–		15	1
Lokomotiv	2019	Uzbekistan Super League	8	1	0	0	0	0	–		8	1
Lokomotiv	2020	Uzbekistan Super League	13	1	1	0	–		–		14	1
Lokomotiv	2021	Uzbekistan Super League	26	8	4	3	–		–		30	11
Lokomotiv	Total		71	12	10	4	0	0	–		81	16
Buxoro (loan)	2020	Uzbekistan Super League	13	0	0	0	–		–		13	0
Esteghlal	2021–22	Persian Gulf Pro League	11	0	1	0	–		–		12	0
Esteghlal	2022–23	Persian Gulf Pro League	1	0	0	0	–		0	0	1	0
Esteghlal	Total		12	0	1	0	–		0	0	13	0
Nasaf	2023	Uzbekistan Super League	26	3	7	4	6	2	–		39	9
Khor Fakkan	2023–24	UAE Pro League	13	2	0	0	–		–		13	2
Career total			135	17	18	8	6	2	0	0	159	27

=== International ===
As of match played 19 November 2024.

National team	Year	Apps	Goals
Uzbekistan
Uzbekistan	2021	3	1
Uzbekistan	2022	4	0
Uzbekistan	2023	1	1
Uzbekistan	2024	3	0
Total		11	2

=== International goals ===
Scores and results list Uzbekistan's goal tally first.

#	Date	Venue	Opponent	Score	Result	Competition
1.	9 October 2021	Amman International Stadium, Amman, Jordan	Malaysia	5–0	5–1	Friendly
2.	25 December 2023	Al Maktoum Stadium, Dubai, United Arab Emirates	Kyrgyzstan	2–0	4–1	Friendly

== Honours ==
Lokomotiv Tashkent

- Uzbekistan Super League: 2017, 2018
- Uzbekistan Cup: 2017
- Uzbekistan Super Cup: 2019

Esteghlal

- Iran Pro League: 2021–22
- Iranian Super Cup: 2022
