= Gustavo Blanco Leschuk =

Argentine footballer

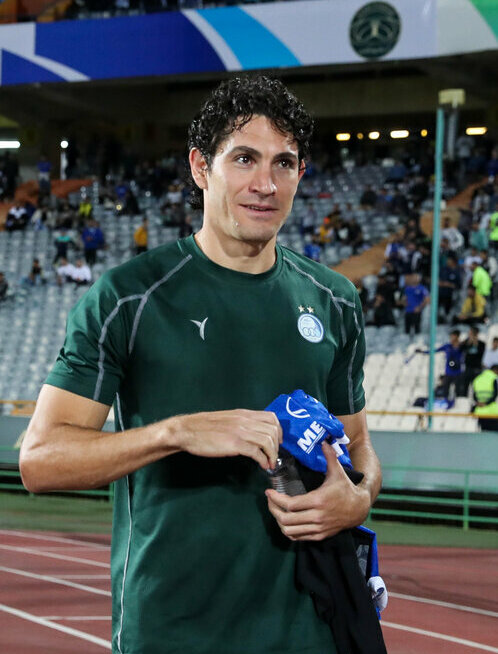
- Gustavo Blanco with Esteghlal in 2023

Personal information
- Full name: Gustavo Ezequiel Blanco Leschuk
- Date of birth: 5 November 1991 (age 35)
- Place of birth: Las Heras, Argentina
- Height: 1.90 m (6 ft 3 in)
- Position: Forward

Youth career
- Arsenal de Sarandí

Senior career*
Years	Team	Apps	(Gls)
2011–2013	Arsenal de Sarandí	19	(2)
2012–2013	→ Deportivo Merlo (loan)	19	(2)
2014	Anzhi Makhachkala	0	(0)
2014–2015	Wydad Casablanca	5	(0)
2015–2016	Assyriska	25	(10)
2016–2017	Karpaty Lviv	26	(9)
2017–2019	Shakhtar Donetsk	28	(5)
2018–2019	→ Málaga (loan)	41	(9)
2019–2022	Antalyaspor	25	(4)
2020–2021	→ Real Oviedo (loan)	33	(7)
2021–2022	→ Eibar (loan)	36	(4)
2022–2023	Eibar	31	(4)
2023–2025	Esteghlal	35	(6)
2025–2026	Foolad	32	(3)
- * Club domestic league appearances and goals as of 21 February 2026

Gustavo Ezequiel Blanco Leschuk (born 5 November 1991) is an Argentine professional footballer who plays as a forward for Persian Gulf Pro League club Foolad.

== Early life ==
Blanco Leschuk was born in Mendoza, Argentina. He is of Ukrainian descent.

== Club career ==
Blanco Leschuk made his professional debut for Arsenal de Sarandí on 8 March 2011 in a 3–0 draw against Independiente. He scored his first goal in a 1–1 draw against Colón on 11 June 2011.

On 27 February 2014, Anzhi Makhachkala announced they had signed Blanco Leschuk on a free transfer. He didn't make a single appearance at the club and left Anzhi at the end of the season.

In September 2014, Blanco Leschuk signed for Moroccan side Wydad Casablanca on a two-year contract, He terminated his contract with the club by mutual consent in February 2015.

Blanco Leschuk joined Assyriska in March 2015. In 2016, he moved to Ukrainian side Karpaty Lviv.

Blanco Leschuk agreed to a contract with Shakhtar Donetsk in 2017, but featured sparingly before joining Spanish club Málaga on loan on 8 August 2018. Upon returning, he switched teams and countries again after signing for Turkish side Antalyaspor.

On 17 September 2020, Blanco Leschuk returned to Spain after joining Real Oviedo on a one-year loan deal. The following 23 July, he moved to Eibar also in the second division, again on loan.

On 16 August 2022, Blanco Leschuk signed a permanent two-year deal with the Armeros. On 30 August 2023, he terminated his contract with the club.

== International career ==
Leschuk has expressed interest in playing for the Ukraine national team.

== Career statistics ==
As of match played 21 February 2026

Appearances and goals by club, season and competition
Club	Season	League			National cup		Continental		Super Cup		Total	
Club	Season	Division	Apps	Goals	Apps	Goals	Apps	Goals	Apps	Goals	Apps	Goals
Esteghlal	2023–24	Pro League	24	6	1	0	—		—		25	6
Esteghlal	2024–25	Pro League	11	0	1	1	5	0	—		17	1
Esteghlal	Total		35	6	2	1	5	0	—		42	7
Foolad	2024–25	Pro League	14	2	0	0	—		—		14	2
Foolad	2025–26	Pro League	18	1	2	0	—		—		20	1
Foolad	Total		32	3	2	0	—		—		34	3
Career total			67	9	4	1	5	0	0	0	76	10

== Honours ==
Arsenal de Sarandí

- Argentine Primera División: 2012 Clausura

Wydad

- Botola: 2014–15

Shakhtar Donetsk

- Ukrainian Premier League: 2016–17, 2017–18
- Ukrainian Cup: 2016–17, 2017–18
- Ukrainian Super Cup: 2017
