= Iman Salimi =

Iranian football defender

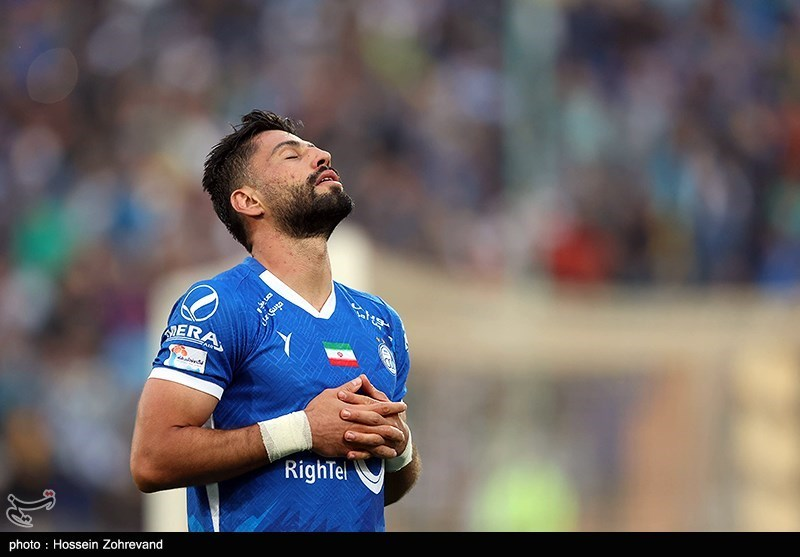
- Salimi with Esteghlal in 2023

Personal information
- Full name: Iman Salimi
- Date of birth: 1 June 1996 (age 30)
- Place of birth: Kermanshah, Iran
- Height: 1.87 m (6 ft 1 1/2 in)
- Position: Centre back

Team information
- Current team: Mes Rafsanjan
- Number: 4

Youth career
- 2013–2014: Aluminium Hormozgan

Senior career*
| Years | Team | Apps | (Gls) |
| 2014–2015 | Aluminium | 6 | (0) |
| 2015–2017 | Fajr Sepasi | 38 | (2) |
| 2017–2018 | Pars Jonoubi | 18 | (0) |
| 2018–2021 | Tractor | 48 | (2) |
| 2021 | Sereď | 8 | (0) |
| 2021–2022 | Gol Gohar | 0 | (0) |
| 2022–2023 | Mes Rafsanjan | 13 | (0) |
| 2023–2025 | Esteghlal | 28 | (2) |
| 2025– | Mes Rafsanjan | 15 | (0) |

International career
| 2013 | Iran U17 | 4 | (0) |
| 2016 | Iran U20 | 4 | (0) |
- * Club domestic league appearances and goals as of 18 March 2025

Iman Salimi (Persian: ایمان سلیمی; born 1 June 1996) is an Iranian professional footballer who plays as a centre-back for Persian Gulf Pro League club Mes Rafsanjan.

== Club career ==
=== ŠKF Sereď ===
On 2 February 2021, Salimi signed a 3-month contract with Fortuna Liga club Sereď. It was his first career stop outside of his home country.

== International career ==
Salimi has represented Iran at under-17 and under-19 levels, including representing Iran at the 2013 FIFA U-17 World Cup.

== Career statistics ==
As of 26 April 2025

| Club | Division | Season | League | | National Cup | | Other | | Total | |
| Club | Division | Season | Apps | Goals | Apps | Goals | Apps | Goals | Apps | Goals |
|---|---|---|---|---|---|---|---|---|---|---|
| Aluminium | Azadegan League | 2014–15 | 6 | 0 | 0 | 0 | — | | 6 | 0 |
| Fajr Sepasi | Azadegan League | 2015–16 | 10 | 0 | 0 | 0 | — | | 10 | 0 |
| Fajr Sepasi | Azadegan League | 2016–17 | 28 | 2 | 2 | 0 | — | | 30 | 2 |
| Fajr Sepasi | Total | | 38 | 2 | 2 | 0 | — | | 40 | 2 |
| Pars Jonoubi | Persian Gulf Pro League | 2017–18 | 18 | 0 | 1 | 0 | — | | 19 | 0 |
| Tractor | Persian Gulf Pro League | 2018–19 | 21 | 2 | 0 | 0 | — | | 21 | 2 |
| Tractor | Persian Gulf Pro League | 2019–20 | 27 | 0 | 4 | 0 | — | | 31 | 0 |
| Tractor | Persian Gulf Pro League | 2020–21 | 0 | 0 | 0 | 0 | — | | 0 | 0 |
| Tractor | Total | | 48 | 2 | 4 | 0 | — | | 52 | 2 |
| Sereď | Slovak Super Liga | 2020–21 | 4 | 0 | 0 | 0 | 3 | 0 | 7 | 0 |
| Mes Rafsanjan F.C. | Persian Gulf Pro League | 2022–23 | 13 | 0 | 2 | 0 | 0 | 0 | 15 | 0 |
| Mes Rafsanjan F.C. | Persian Gulf Pro League | 2025-26 | 10 | 0 | 0 | 0 | - | - | 10 | 0 |
| Mes Rafsanjan F.C. | Total | | 23 | 0 | 2 | 0 | 0 | 0 | 25 | 0 |
| Esteghlal | Persian Gulf Pro League | 2023–24 | 22 | 2 | 0 | 0 | 0 | 0 | 22 | 2 |
| Esteghlal | Persian Gulf Pro League | 2024–25 | 6 | 0 | 2 | 0 | 5 | 0 | 13 | 0 |
| Esteghlal | Total | | 28 | 2 | 2 | 0 | 5 | 0 | 35 | 2 |
| Career total | | | 150 | 6 | 9 | 0 | 8 | 0 | 167 | 6 |

== Honors ==
Tractor:

- Hazfi Cup : 2019–20

Esteghlal:

- Hazfi Cup: 2024–25
