= Siavash Yazdani =

Iranian footballer (born 1992)

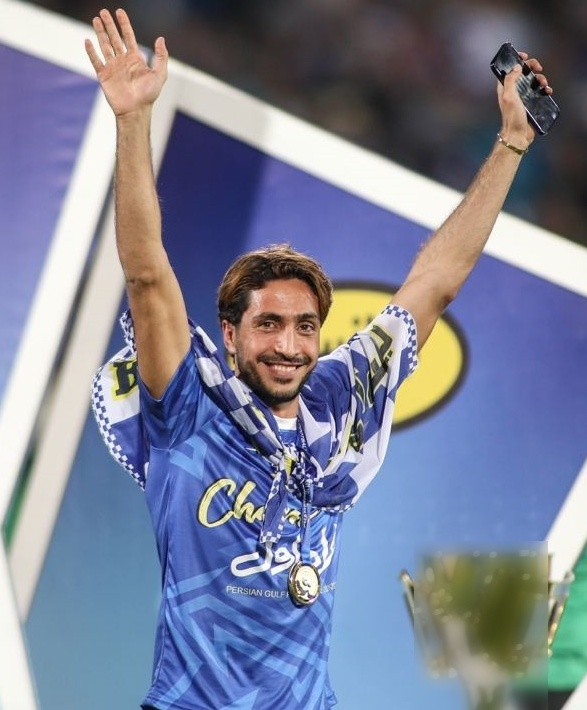
- Yazdani with Esteghlal in 2022

Personal information
- Full name: Siavash Yazdani Moghadam
- Date of birth: 27 February 1992 (age 34)
- Place of birth: Mashhad, Iran
- Height: 1.92 m (6 ft 3 1/2 in)
- Position: Centre back

Team information
- Current team: Al-Talaba
- Number: 3

Youth career
- 2005–2007: Fath Mashhad
- 2010–2012: Siah Jamegan

Senior career*
Years	Team	Apps	(Gls)
2012–2014	Siah Jamegan	25	(0)
2014–2017	Paykan	84	(4)
2017–2019	Sepahan	51	(2)
2019–2023	Esteghlal	51	(1)
2022	→ Malavan (loan)	0	(0)
2023–2025	Sepahan	34	(0)
2025–2026	Gol Gohar	16	(1)
2026	Al-Talaba	7	(1)

International career^{‡}
2022	Iran	1	(0)
- * Club domestic league appearances and goals as of 23 November 2023 ‡ National team caps and goals as of 1 February 2022

Siavash Yazdani (Persian: سیاوش یزدانی; born 27 February 1992) is an Iranian professional footballer who plays as a centre-back for Iraqi Stars League club Al-Talaba.

== Career statistics ==
=== Club ===
Club	Season	League			Cup		Continental		Total	
Club	Season	League	Apps	Goals	Apps	Goals	Apps	Goals	Apps	Goals
Siah Jamegan	2013-14	Azadegan League	10	0	0	0	0	0	10	0
Peykan	2014-15	Persian Gulf Pro League	22	0	1	1	0	0	23	1
Peykan	2015-16	Azadegan League	35	2	1	0	0	0	36	2
Peykan	2016-17	Persian Gulf Pro League	27	1	2	0	0	0	29	1
Peykan	Total		84	3	4	1	0	0	88	4
Sepahan	2017-18	Persian Gulf Pro League	25	1	0	0	0	0	25	1
Sepahan	2018-19	Persian Gulf Pro League	26	1	3	0	0	0	29	1
Sepahan	Total		51	2	3	0	0	0	54	2
Esteghlal	2019-20	Persian Gulf Pro League	12	0	2	0	0	0	14	0
Esteghlal	2020-21	Persian Gulf Pro League	18	0	5	0	7	0	30	0
Esteghlal	2021-22	Persian Gulf Pro League	17	1	1	0	0	0	18	1
Esteghlal	2022-23	Persian Gulf Pro League	4	0	1	0	0	0	5	0
Esteghlal	Total		51	1	9	0	7	0	67	1
Sepahan	2022-23	Persian Gulf Pro League	5	0	1	0	0	0	6	0
Sepahan	2023-24	Persian Gulf Pro League	6	0	0	0	5	0	11	0
Sepahan	Total		11	0	1	0	5	0	17	0
Career Total			207	6	17	1	12	0	236	7

== Club career ==
=== Siah Jamegan ===
Yazdani joined Siah Jamegan in summer 2012. He was with Siah Jamegan in the 2012–13 Iran Football's 2nd Division and promoting with them to Division 1. He was a regular starter in his second season with Siah Jamgean while they failed to gain promotion to the Pro League after losing to Paykan in the play-off.

=== Paykan ===
On July 7, 2014, he joined newly promoted Paykan with a 3-year contract. He made his debut for Paykan on September 12, 2014, against Zob Ahan as a starter.

=== Sepahan ===
He signed a contract with Sepahan.

=== Esteghlal ===
He transferred from Sepahan to Esteghlal club in summer 2019.

=== Malavan ===
He joined Malavan on loan from Esteghlal to perform his military service.

== International career ==
He was called for the first time for the Iran national team (Team Melli) in 2019.

He made his debut for the Iran national team in the 2022 Qatar World Cup qualifier against the UAE national team on February 1, 2022, in a 2–0 victory for Iran. He came on for Milad Mohammadi in a late substitution in the 82nd minute.

== Honours ==
Sepahan

- Iranian Hazfi Cup: 2023–24
