= Gholamreza Sabet Imani =

Iranian footballer

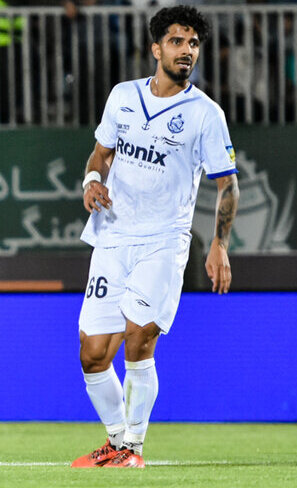

Personal information
- Date of birth: 6 April 2000 (age 26)
- Place of birth: Larestan, Iran
- Height: 1.81 m (5 ft 11 1/2 in)
- Position: Midfielder

Team information
- Current team: Sepahan
- Number: 23

Youth career
- 2016–2018: Sepahan

Senior career*
| Years | Team | Apps | (Gls) |
| 2018–2019 | Pars Jonoubi Jam | 1 | (0) |
| 2019–2021 | Nirooye Zamini | 16 | (3) |
| 2021–2025 | Paykan | 73 | (2) |
| 2025–2026 | Malavan | 29 | (0) |
| 2026– | Sepahan | 5 | (0) |

International career^{‡}
| 2023 | Iran U23 | 2 | (0) |
- * Club domestic league appearances and goals as of 18 April 2025 ‡ National team caps and goals as of 1 October 2023

Gholamreza Sabet Imani (Persian: غلام‌رضا ثابت‌ایمانی, born 6 April 2000) is an Iranian footballer who plays as a midfielder for Sepahan in the Persian Gulf Pro League.
