= Mehdi Abdi (footballer, born 1989) =

Iranian footballer

Personal information
- Full name: Mehdi Abdi
- Date of birth: 21 March 1989 (age 37)
- Place of birth: Mamulan, Iran
- Height: 1.78 m (5 ft 10 in)
- Position: Center back

Team information
- Current team: Havadar
- Number: 21

Youth career
- Datis Lorestan

Senior career*
Years	Team	Apps	(Gls)
2014–2017	Kheybar	63	(6)
2017–2018	Shahrdari Mahshahr	29	(2)
2018–2019	Shahin Bushehr	11	(0)
2019–	Havadar	86	(2)
- * Club domestic league appearances and goals as of 25 May 2023

Mehdi Aadi Persian: مهدی عبدی, (born 21 March 1989) is an Iranian footballer who currently plays for Havadar in the Persian Gulf Pro League
