= United Arab Emirates national football team results =

This article details the international fixtures and results of the United Arab Emirates national football team.

== Results by years ==
=== 1970s ===
15 March 1974 Friendly	Kuwait	2 – 0	United Arab Emirates	Kuwait City, Kuwait

18 March 1974 3rd Arabian Gulf Cup	United Arab Emirates	4 – 0	Bahrain	Kuwait City, Kuwait

23 March 1974 3rd Arabian Gulf Cup	Saudi Arabia	2 – 0	United Arab Emirates	Kuwait City, Kuwait

26 March 1974 3rd Arabian Gulf Cup	Kuwait	6 – 0	United Arab Emirates	Kuwait City, Kuwait

28 March 1974 3rd Arabian Gulf Cup	Qatar	1 – 1 (4 – 1 p)	United Arab Emirates	Kuwait City, Kuwait

19 December 1975 1975 Palestine Cup	Tunisia	3 – 0	United Arab Emirates	Tunis, Tunisia

21 December 1975 1975 Palestine Cup	Iraq	5 – 0	United Arab Emirates	Tunis, Tunisia

27 March 1976 4th Arabian Gulf Cup	Bahrain	3 – 2	United Arab Emirates	Doha, Qatar

29 March 1976 4th Arabian Gulf Cup	Saudi Arabia	2 – 0	United Arab Emirates	Doha, Qatar

1 April 1976 4th Arabian Gulf Cup	Qatar	3 – 1	United Arab Emirates	Doha, Qatar

3 April 1976 4th Arabian Gulf Cup	Kuwait	0 – 0	United Arab Emirates	Doha, Qatar

6 April 1976 4th Arabian Gulf Cup	Iraq	4 – 0	United Arab Emirates	Doha, Qatar

10 April 1976 4th Arabian Gulf Cup	United Arab Emirates	1 – 1	Oman	Doha, Qatar

11 January 1979 1980 AFC Asian Cup qualification	United Arab Emirates	0 – 0	Lebanon	(United Arab Emirates) Abu Dhabi, UAE

13 January 1979 1980 AFC Asian Cup qualification	United Arab Emirates	0 – 0	Syria	(United Arab Emirates) Abu Dhabi, UAE

16 January 1979 1980 AFC Asian Cup qualification	United Arab Emirates	2 – 0 Awarded	Bahrain	(United Arab Emirates) Abu Dhabi, UAE

24 March 1979 5th Arabian Gulf Cup	Saudi Arabia	2 – 1	United Arab Emirates	Baghdad, Iraq

26 March 1979 5th Arabian Gulf Cup	Bahrain	3 – 0	United Arab Emirates	Baghdad, Iraq

28 March 1979 5th Arabian Gulf Cup	Qatar	1 – 0	United Arab Emirates	Baghdad, Iraq

31 March 1979 5th Arabian Gulf Cup	Kuwait	7 – 0	United Arab Emirates	Baghdad, Iraq

3 April 1979 5th Arabian Gulf Cup	Iraq	5 – 0	United Arab Emirates	Baghdad, Iraq

9 April 1979 5th Arabian Gulf Cup	United Arab Emirates	4 – 0	Oman	Baghdad, Iraq

=== 1980s ===
15 September 1980 1980 AFC Asian Cup	Kuwait	1 – 1	United Arab Emirates	Kuwait City, Kuwait

17 September 1980 1980 AFC Asian Cup	Qatar	2 – 1	United Arab Emirates	Kuwait City, Kuwait

20 September 1980 1980 AFC Asian Cup	Malaysia	2 – 0	United Arab Emirates	Kuwait City, Kuwait

24 September 1980 1980 AFC Asian Cup	South Korea	4 – 1	United Arab Emirates	Kuwait City, Kuwait

2 September 1981 1981 Merdeka Cup	United Arab Emirates	2 – 5	Indonesia	Kuala Lumpur, Malaysia

5 September 1981 1981 Merdeka Cup	United Arab Emirates	0 – 2	India	Kuala Lumpur, Malaysia

8 September 1981 1981 Merdeka Cup	United Arab Emirates	2 – 3	Japan	Kuala Lumpur, Malaysia

10 September 1981 1981 Merdeka Cup	United Arab Emirates	1 – 0	New Zealand	Kuala Lumpur, Malaysia

12 September 1981 1981 Merdeka Cup	Malaysia	0 – 1	United Arab Emirates	Kuala Lumpur, Malaysia

26 October 1981 Friendly	United Arab Emirates	2 – 0	India	(United Arab Emirates) Abu Dhabi, UAE

28 October 1981 Friendly	United Arab Emirates	3 – 1	India	(United Arab Emirates) Sharjah, UAE

27 December 1981 Friendly	United Arab Emirates	1 – 2	Tunisia	(United Arab Emirates) Dubai, UAE

29 December 1981 Friendly	United Arab Emirates	1 – 4	Tunisia	(United Arab Emirates) Abu Dhabi, UAE

=== 2020s ===
September 24 2026 27th Arabian Gulf Cup	United Arab Emirates	4-0	Yemen	(Saudi Arabia) Jeddah, KSA
		Report

September 27 2026 27th Arabian Gulf Cup	United Arab Emirates	3-0	Bahrain	(Saudi Arabia) Jeddah, KSA
		Report

September 30 2026 27th Arabian Gulf Cup	United Arab Emirates	1-1	Qatar	(Saudi Arabia) Jeddah, KSA
		Report

October 3 2026 27th Arabian Gulf Cup	United Arab Emirates	1-0	Oman	(Saudi Arabia) Jeddah, KSA
		Report

October 6 2026 27th Arabian Gulf Cup	United Arab Emirates	0-2	Saudi Arabia	(Saudi Arabia) Jeddah, KSA
		Report

== See also ==
United Arab Emirates national football team all-time record
