= Omid Hamedifar =

Iranian footballer (born 2000)

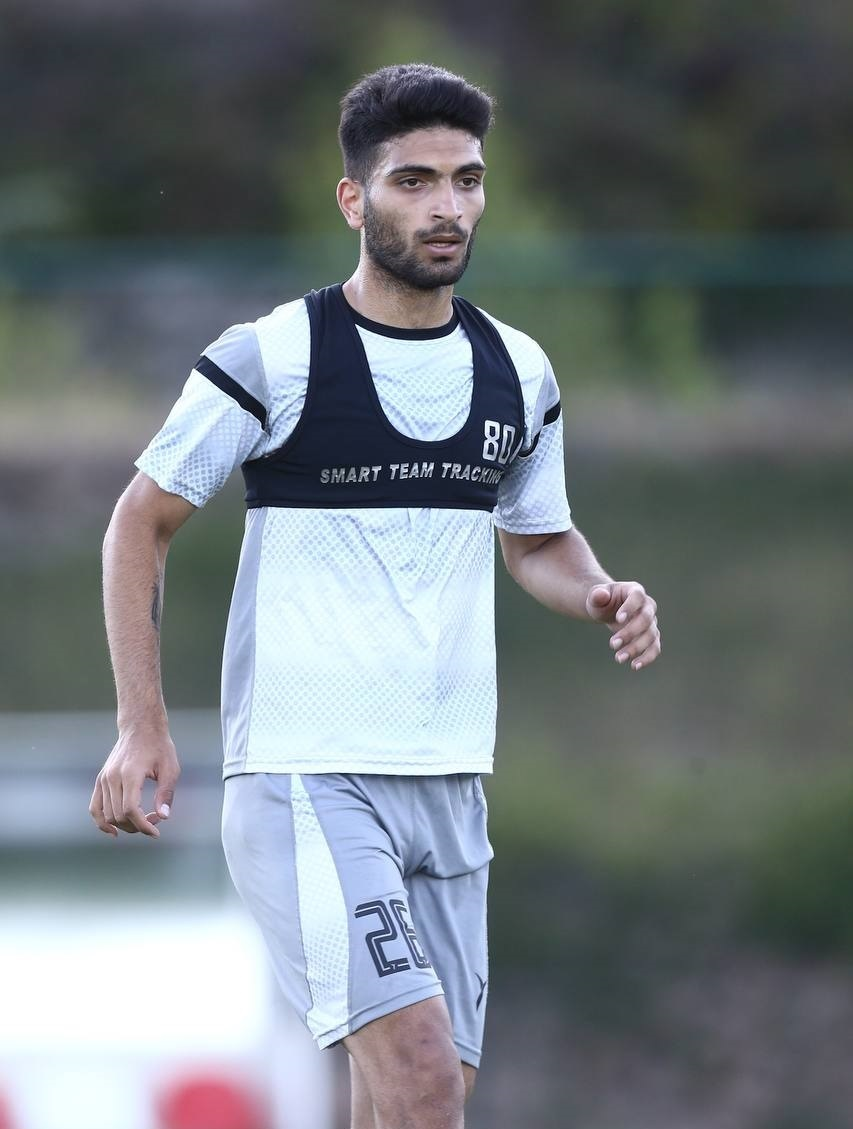
- Hamedifar in 2022

Personal information
- Date of birth: 19 August 2000 (age 26)
- Place of birth: Shush, Iran
- Height: 1.84 m (6 ft 0 in)
- Position: Midfielder

Team information
- Current team: Foolad
- Number: 6

Youth career
- 2018–2019: Foolad

Senior career*
Years	Team	Apps	(Gls)
2019–2022	Sanat Naft	40	(1)
2022–2024	Esteghlal	32	(0)
2024–2026	Gol Gohar	29	(2)
2026–	Foolad	6	(1)

International career^{‡}
2021	Iran U23	2	(0)
- * Club domestic league appearances and goals as of 2 May 2025 ‡ National team caps and goals as of 6 March 2022

Omid Hamedifar (Persian: امیدحامدی فر; born 19 August 2000) is an Iranian footballer who plays for Foolad in the Persian Gulf Pro League.

== Career statistics ==
=== Club ===
As of 1 June 2024

Club	Season	League			Hazfi Cup		ACL		Other		Total	
Club	Season	League	Apps	Goals	Apps	Goals	Apps	Goals	Apps	Goals	Apps	Goals
Sanat Naft	2019–20	Persian Gulf Pro League	4	0	0	0	0	0	0	0	4	0
Sanat Naft	2020–21	Persian Gulf Pro League	14	0	1	0	0	0	0	0	15	0
Sanat Naft	2021–22	Persian Gulf Pro League	21	1	1	0	0	0	0	0	22	1
Sanat Naft	total		39	1	2	0	0	0	0	0	41	1
Esteghlal	2022–23	Persian Gulf Pro League	10	0	3	0	0	0	0	0	13	0
Esteghlal	2023–24	Persian Gulf Pro League	22	0	1	0	0	0	0	0	23	0
Esteghlal	Total		32	0	4	0	0	0	0	0	36	0
Career Totals			71	1	6	0	0	0	0	0	77	1

== Club career ==
=== Sanat Naft ===
Hamedifar made his debut for Sanat Naft in 13th fixtures of 2019–20 Iran Pro League against Paykan while he substituted in for Moslem Mojademi.

=== Esteghlal ===
On 28 June 2022, he signed a 2-year contract with Esteghlal.

== Honours ==
Esteghlal

- Iranian Super Cup: 2022
