= Sardar Bukan F.C. =

Iranian football club

Sardar Bukan
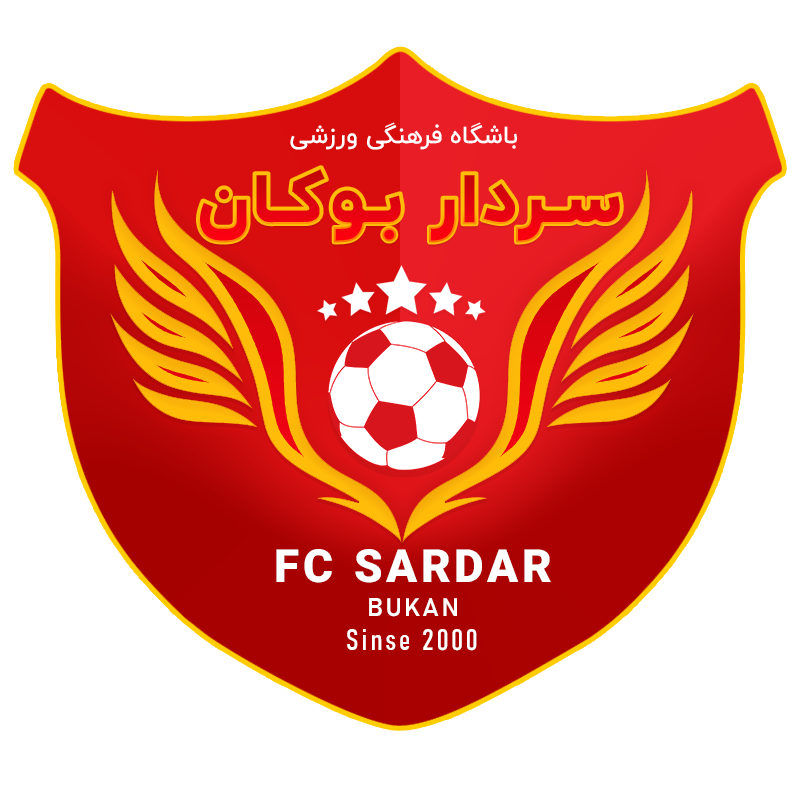
- Full name: Sardar Bukan Football Club
- Founded: 2000; 19 years ago
- Ground: Khatam Al Anbia Stadium, Bukan
- Capacity: 20,000
- Owner: Municipality of Bukan
- Manager: Rasul Khatibi
- League: League 2
- Website: http://sardarclub.ir

Sardar Bukan Football Club is an Iranian football club based in Bukan and playing in the Iranian League 2.

== History ==
=== Establishment ===
Sardar Bukan was founded in 2000 and began playing in the West Azerbaijan Provincial League. The team's name comes from Aziz Khan Mukri who was called Sardar and was the head of the Iranian Army during the reign of Naser al-Din Shah Qajar.

=== Promotions ===
They finished as runners up in 2001 and champions in 2002, earning promotion to League 3. In 2005 the club started its professional functions, and in 2015 for the first time, the club began to play in League 2, which is the Iranian third tier. In the 2016–17 season they barely missed out on promotion to the Azadegan League (2nd tier).

== Players ==
As of 21 September 2017:

=== Current squad ===
Note: Flags indicate national team as defined under FIFA eligibility rules; some limited exceptions apply. Players may hold more than one non-FIFA nationality.

No.	Pos.	Nation	Player
—		IRN	Bahman Tahmasebi
—		IRN	Reza Safaripouya
—		IRN	Habib Afra
—		IRN	Mohammad Ajier
—		IRN	Milad Nabati
—		IRN	Saman Nourmohammadi
—		IRN	Ali Motvari
—		IRN	Nasser Abdi
—		IRN	Mohammad Chahrmahali
—		IRN	Younes Azizi
—		IRN	Faryad Aghayari
—		IRN	Majid Gharish
—		IRN	Siamak Tabnak
—		IRN	Vahid Hajiarabi

No.	Pos.	Nation	Player
—		IRN	Amirreza Parszadeh
—		IRN	Mohammad Malayi
—		IRN	Shahrokh Kadkhodaei
—		IRN	Iraj Khodayari
—		IRN	Sirvan Ghorbani
—		IRN	Jaber Nassiri
—		IRN	Amir Abbasi
—		IRN	Morteza Abbaszadeh
—		IRN	Mohsen Rouanjam
—		IRN	Zaniyar Shahabi
—		IRN	Ghasem Gerami
—		IRN	Siavash Bahrami
—		IRN	Abbas Kandel

== Personnel ==
=== Coaching staff ===
Staff	Name
Head coach	(Iran) Pirouz Ghorbani
Assistant coach	(Iran) Hamidreza Ghanizadeh
Assistant coach	(Iran) Kamran Gharni
Assistant coach	(Iran) Hossein Mir Hesami
Doctor	(Iran) Hakim Hosseinzadeh
