= Saman Touranian =

Iranian footballer

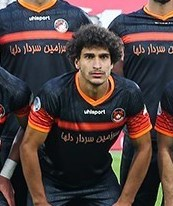

Personal information
- Full name: Saman Touranian
- Date of birth: 12 December 2001 (age 24)
- Place of birth: Kerman, Iran
- Height: 1.77 m (5 ft 10 in)
- Position: Right back

Team information
- Current team: Esteghlal
- Number: 6

Youth career
- –2020: Mes Kerman

Senior career*
Years	Team	Apps	(Gls)
2020–2023	Mes Kerman	51	(2)
2023–	Esteghlal	8	(0)
2024–2026	→ Malavan (loan)	35	(0)

International career
2022–2023	Iran U23	12	(1)
2022	Iran	1	(0)
- * Club domestic league appearances and goals as of 10 September 2026

Saman Touranian (Persian: سامان تورانیان; born 12 December 2001) is an Iranian professional footballer who plays as a Defender for Esteghlal in the Persian Gulf Pro League.

== Career statistics ==
=== Club ===
As of 10 September 2026

Club	Season	League			Cup		Continental		Total	
Club	Season	League	Apps	Goals	Apps	Goals	Apps	Goals	Apps	Goals
Mes	2020–21	Azadegan League	4	0	2	0	–	–	6	0
Mes	2021–22	Azadegan League	22	2	5	0	–	–	27	2
Mes	2022–23	Persian Gulf Pro League	25	0	2	0	–	–	27	0
Mes	Total		51	2	9	0	–	–	60	2
Esteghlal	2023–24	Persian Gulf Pro League	3	0	0	0	–	–	3	0
Esteghlal	2025–26	Persian Gulf Pro League	0	0	0	0	0	0	0	0
Esteghlal	2026–27	Persian Gulf Pro League	5	0	0	0	0	0	5	0
Esteghlal	Total		8	0	0	0	0	0	8	0
Malavan	2024–25	Persian Gulf Pro League	24	0	5	0	–	–	29	0
Malavan	2025–26	Persian Gulf Pro League	11	0	2	0	–	–	13	0
Malavan	Total		35	0	7	0	–	–	42	0
Career Total			94	2	16	0	0	0	110	2

== Club career ==
=== Mes Kerman ===
He started football with his hometown team, Mes Kerman, and after playing for the reserve team, he was promoted to the premier league with the main team and was one of the main members of the team in the 2022–23 Persian Gulf Pro League.

=== Esteghlal ===
Saman joined Esteghlal in the summer transfers of the 2023–2024 Persian Gulf Pro League Season.

== International career ==
Saman Turanian made his international debut on 10 November 2022 in a friendly match against Nicaragua.

=== International ===
As of match played 10 November 2022

Appearances and goals by national team and year
National team	Year	Apps	Goals
Iran
Iran	2022	1	0
Total		1	0
