= Sirvan Ghorbani =

Iranian footballer (born 1993)

Personal information
- Date of birth: 26 September 1993 (age 33)
- Place of birth: Kamyaran, Iran
- Height: 1.84 m (6 ft 0 in)
- Position: Left-back

Team information
- Current team: Fajr Sepasi
- Number: 23

Youth career
- –2009: Naft Omidiyeh
- 2009–2011: PAS Hamedan

Senior career*
Years	Team	Apps	(Gls)
2011–2014	Sulaymaniya	20	(1)
2014–2016	Avalan Kamyaran	17	(0)
2016–2018	Sardar Bukan	10	(1)
2018–2020	Sanat Naft Abadan	25	(0)
2020–2021	Naft Masjed Soleyman	14	(1)
2021–	Fajr Sepasi	10	(1)
- * Club domestic league appearances and goals as of 1 July 2022

Sirvan Ghorbani (Persian: سیروان قربانی; born 26 September 1993) is an Iranian footballer who plays as a left-back for Fajr sepasi in the Persian Gulf Pro League.
