= Mohammad Javad Kia =

Iranian footballer

Personal information
- Full name: Mohammad Javad Kia
- Date of birth: 29 August 2001 (age 25)
- Place of birth: Kordkuy, Iran
- Height: 1.93 m (6 ft 4 in)
- Position: Goalkeeper

Team information
- Current team: Esteghlal Khuzestan
- Number: 1

Youth career
- 2016–2017: Padideh Arsh Iranian
- 2017: Diako
- 2017–2018: Padideh Arsh Iranian
- 2018–2019: Esteghlal

Senior career*
| Years | Team | Apps | (Gls) |
| 2019–2022 | Padideh | 4 | (0) |
| 2022–2023 | Aluminium Arak | 0 | (0) |
| 2023–2024 | Esteghlal | 0 | (0) |
| 2024–2025 | Havadar | 10 | (0) |
| 2025– | Esteghlal Khuzestan | 21 | (0) |

International career^{‡}
| 2021–2023 | Iran U23 | 0 | (0) |
- * Club domestic league appearances and goals as of 24 May 2021 ‡ National team caps and goals as of 24 December 2021

Mohammad Javad Kia (Persian: محمدجواد کیاء; born August 29, 2001) is an Iranian footballer who plays for Esteghlal Khuzestan in the Persian Gulf Pro League.

== Career statistics ==
=== Club ===
| Club | Season | League | | | Cup | | Continental | | Total | |
| Club | Season | League | Apps | Goals | Apps | Goals | Apps | Goals | Apps | Goals |
|---|---|---|---|---|---|---|---|---|---|---|
| Shahr Khodro | 2019–20 | Pro League | 0 | 0 | 0 | 0 | 2 | 0 | 2 | 0 |
| Shahr Khodro | 2020–21 | Pro League | 3 | 0 | 0 | 0 | 0 | 0 | 3 | 0 |
| Shahr Khodro | 2021–22 | Pro League | 1 | 0 | 0 | 0 | 0 | 0 | 1 | 0 |
| Shahr Khodro | Total | | 4 | 0 | 0 | 0 | 2 | 0 | 6 | 0 |
| Esteghlal | 2023–24 | Pro League | 0 | 0 | 0 | 0 | 0 | 0 | 0 | 0 |
| Career Total | | | 4 | 0 | 0 | 0 | 2 | 0 | 6 | 0 |
