= Arman Ramezani =

Iranian footballer

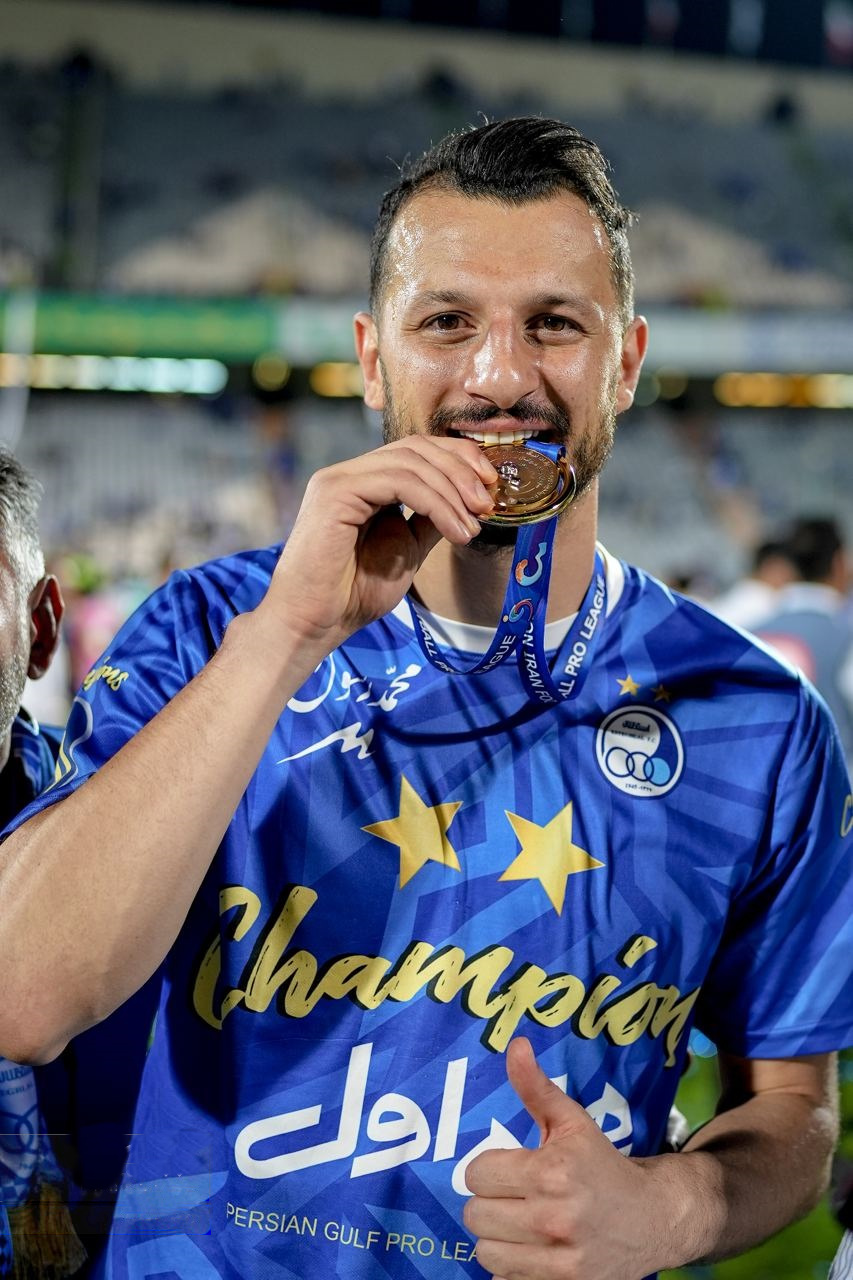

Personal information
- Date of birth: 22 June 1992 (age 34)
- Place of birth: Masal, Guilan, Iran
- Height: 1.92 m (6 ft 4 in)
- Position: Striker

Team information
- Current team: Zob Ahan
- Number: 21

Youth career
- 2010–2013: Malavan

Senior career*
| Years | Team | Apps | (Gls) |
| 2011–2015 | Malavan | 13 | (1) |
| 2013–2014 | → Fajr Sepasi (loan) | 9 | (1) |
| 2015 | → Fajr Sepasi (loan) | 2 | (1) |
| 2015–2016 | PAS | 19 | (1) |
| 2016–2017 | Mes Rafsanjan | 31 | (6) |
| 2017–2018 | Oxin United | 17 | (3) |
| 2018–2020 | Saipa | 71 | (12) |
| 2020–2021 | Persepolis | 9 | (0) |
| 2021–2025 | Esteghlal | 82 | (8) |
| 2025– | Zob Ahan | 9 | (0) |
- * Club domestic league appearances and goals as of 15‌ May 2025

Arman Ramezani (Persian: آرمان رمضانی; born 22 June 1992) is an Iranian professional footballer who plays as a forward for Iranian football club Zob Ahan Esfahan in the Persian Gulf Pro League.

== Club career ==
=== Malavan ===
He joined to first team by Farhad Pourgholami and made his debut for Malavan in 2013–14 Iran Pro League against Gahar as a substitute.

=== Persepolis ===
On 8 September 2020, Ramezani signed a two-year contract with Persian Gulf Pro League champions Persepolis.

== Club career statistics ==
As of 15 May 2025

| Club | Division | Season | League | | Hazfi Cup | | Asia | | Total | |
| Club | Division | Season | Apps | Goals | Apps | Goals | Apps | Goals | Apps | Goals |
|---|---|---|---|---|---|---|---|---|---|---|
| Malavan | Pro League | 2011–12 | 0 | 0 | 0 | 0 | — | | 0 | 0 |
| Malavan | Pro League | 2012–13 | 6 | 0 | 0 | 0 | — | | 6 | 0 |
| Malavan | Pro League | 2013–14 | 3 | 0 | 0 | 0 | — | | 3 | 0 |
| Malavan | Pro League | 2014–15 | 2 | 0 | 0 | 0 | — | | 2 | 0 |
| Malavan | Total | | 11 | 0 | 0 | 0 | 0 | 0 | 11 | 0 |
| Fajr Sepasi (loan) | Pro League | 2013–14 | 9 | 1 | 0 | 0 | — | | 9 | 1 |
| Fajr Sepasi (loan) | Azadegan League | 2015–16 | 3 | 1 | 0 | 0 | — | | 3 | 1 |
| PAS | Azadegan League | 2015–16 | 19 | 1 | 0 | 0 | — | | 19 | 1 |
| Mes Rafsanjan | Azadegan League | 2016–17 | 31 | 6 | 2 | 0 | — | | 33 | 6 |
| Oxin Alborz | Azadegan League | 2017 | 17 | 3 | 1 | 1 | — | | 18 | 4 |
| Saipa | Pro League | 2018 | 13 | 5 | 0 | 0 | — | | 13 | 5 |
| Saipa | Pro League | 2018–19 | 30 | 3 | 4 | 1 | 2 | 2 | 36 | 6 |
| Saipa | Pro League | 2019–20 | 28 | 4 | 2 | 0 | — | | 30 | 4 |
| Saipa | Total | | 71 | 12 | 6 | 1 | 2 | 2 | 79 | 15 |
| Persepolis | Pro League | 2020–21 | 9 | 0 | 0 | 0 | 6 | 0 | 15 | 0 |
| Esteghlal | Pro League | 2020–21 | 12 | 2 | 1 | 0 | 4 | 0 | 17 | 2 |
| Esteghlal | Pro League | 2021–22 | 16 | 2 | 3 | 1 | 0 | 0 | 19 | 3 |
| Esteghlal | Pro League | 2022–23 | 15 | 0 | 4 | 1 | 0 | 0 | 19 | 1 |
| Esteghlal | Pro League | 2023–24 | 27 | 3 | 1 | 0 | 0 | 0 | 28 | 3 |
| Esteghlal | Pro League | 2024–2025 | 12 | 1 | 1 | 0 | 4 | 0 | 17 | 1 |
| Esteghlal | Total | | 82 | 8 | 10 | 2 | 8 | 0 | 100 | 10 |
| Zob Ahan | Pro League | 2024–25 | 9 | 0 | 1 | 0 | – | – | 10 | 0 |
| Career totals | | | 261 | 32 | 20 | 4 | 16 | 2 | 297 | 38 |

== Honours ==
Persepolis

- AFC Champions League runner-up: 2020

Esteghlal

- Persian Gulf Pro League: 2021–22
- Hazfi Cup runner-up: 2020–21, 2022–23
- Iranian Super Cup: 2022
