= Zobeir Niknafs =

Iranian footballer

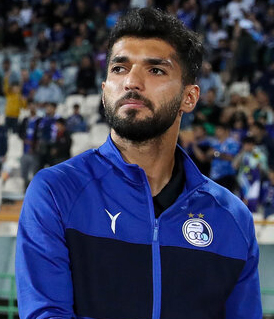
- Niknafs with Esteghlal in 2023

Personal information
- Full name: Mohammad Zobeir Niknafs
- Date of birth: April 12, 1993 (age 33)
- Place of birth: Sanandaj, Iran
- Height: 1.82 m (6 ft 0 in)
- Position: Midfielder

Team information
- Current team: Mes Shahr-e Babak
- Number: 14

Youth career
- –2011: Persepolis
- 2011–2012: Sanat Naft

Senior career*
Years	Team	Apps	(Gls)
2012–2018	Sanat Naft	106	(4)
2018–2020	Zob Ahan	24	(1)
2020–2021	Foolad	33	(2)
2021–2025	Esteghlal	81	(0)
2025–2026	Fajr Sepasi	12	(0)
2026–	Mes Shahr-e Babak	10	(2)

International career
2021	Iran	0	(0)
- * Club domestic league appearances and goals as of 27 February 2026

Mohammad Zobeir Niknafs (Persian: زبیر نیک نفس; born April 12, 1993), known as Zobeir Niknafs, is an Iranian football midfielder. He currently plays for Mes Shahr-e Babak in Persian Gulf Pro League.

== Honours ==
=== Foolad ===
- Hazfi Cup: 2020–21

=== Esteghlal ===
- Persian Gulf Pro League: 2021–22
- Iranian Hazfi Cup : 2024–25
- Iranian Super Cup: 2022

== Career statistics ==
=== Club ===
As of 27 February 2026

Club	Season	League			Hazfi Cup		Acl		Total	
Club	Season	League	Apps	Goals	Apps	Goals	Apps	Goals	Apps	Goals
Sanat Naft	2012–13	Iran Pro League	13	0	0	0	0	0	13	0
Sanat Naft	2013–14	Azadegan League	3	0	0	0	0	0	3	0
Sanat Naft	2014–15	Azadegan League	10	1	0	0	0	0	10	1
Sanat Naft	2015–16	Azadegan League	29	1	0	0	0	0	29	1
Sanat Naft	2016–17	Persian Gulf Pro League	28	2	0	0	0	0	28	2
Sanat Naft	2017–18	Persian Gulf Pro League	23	0	3	0	0	0	26	0
Sanat Naft	Total		106	4	3	0	0	0	109	4
Zob Ahan	2018–19	Persian Gulf Pro League	21	1	1	0	5	1	27	2
Zob Ahan	2019–20	Persian Gulf Pro League	3	0	1	0	0	0	4	0
Zob Ahan	Total		24	1	2	0	5	1	31	2
Foolad	2019–20	Persian Gulf Pro League	11	0	0	0	0	0	11	0
Foolad	2020–21	Persian Gulf Pro League	22	2	3	0	6	0	31	2
Foolad	Total		33	2	3	0	6	0	42	2
Esteghlal	2021–22	Persian Gulf Pro League	23	0	3	0	1	0	27	0
Esteghlal	2022–23	Persian Gulf Pro League	17	0	3	0	0	0	20	0
Esteghlal	2023–24	Persian Gulf Pro League	23	0	0	0	0	0	23	0
Esteghlal	2024–25	Persian Gulf Pro League	18	0	2	0	7	0	27	0
Esteghlal	Total		81	0	8	0	8	0	97	0
Fajr Sepasi	2025–26	Persian Gulf Pro League	12	0	0	0	–	–	12	0
Career Total			256	7	16	0	19	1	291	8

== Personal life ==
On 3 January 2026, Niknafs publicly supported the 2025–2026 Iranian protests by posting a poem by Mojtaba Kashani, stating "Don't think that I am worried about the cancer of my homeland while thinking about my body."
