= Aref Aghasi =

Iranian footballer

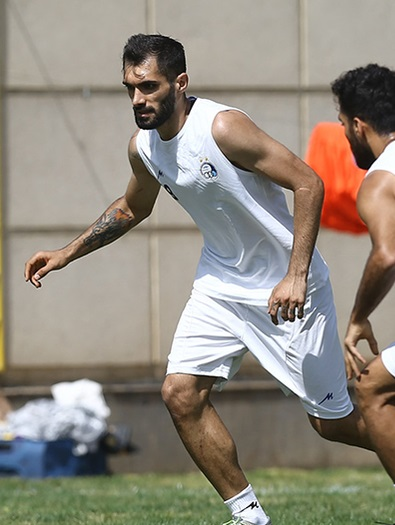
- Aghasi with Esteghlal FC 2021

Personal information
- Full name: Aref Aghasi Kolahsorkhi
- Date of birth: 2 January 1997 (age 29)
- Place of birth: Izeh, Iran
- Height: 1.85 m (6 ft 1 in)
- Position: Centre-back

Team information
- Current team: Esteghlal
- Number: 23

Senior career*
Years	Team	Apps	(Gls)
2015–2021	Foolad	51	(1)
2016–2018	→ Tractor (loan)	12	(0)
2021–2022	Esteghlal	8	(0)
2022–2023	Foolad	35	(1)
2023–2025	Tractor	59	(3)
2025–	Esteghlal	15	(0)

International career^{‡}
2016–2019	Iran U20	1	(0)
2022–	Iran	7	(0)
Medal record
Representing Iran
CAFA Nations Cup
Runner-up	2025 Tajikistan–Uzbekistan	Team
- * Club domestic league appearances and goals as of 7 November 2026 ‡ National team caps and goals as of 14 November 2026

Aref Aghasi Kolahsorkhi (Persian: عارف آقاسی کلاه سرخی; born 2 January 1997) is an Iranian footballer who plays as a Centre-Back for Iranian club Esteghlal in Persian Gulf Pro League and the Iran national team.

== International career ==
He made his debut against Algeria on 12 June 2022 in a friendly match.

== Career statistics ==
=== Club ===
As of 7 November 2026

Club	Season	League			Cup		Continental		Other		Total	
Club	Season	League	Apps	Goals	Apps	Goals	Apps	Goals	Apps	Goals	Apps	Goals
Foolad Novin	2014–15	Azadegan League	1	0	0	0	0	0	0	0	1	0
Tractor	2016–17	Persian Gulf Pro League	2	0	0	0	0	0	0	0	2	0
Tractor	2017–18	Persian Gulf Pro League	10	0	1	0	3	0	0	0	14	0
Tractor	Total		12	0	1	0	3	0	0	0	16	0
Foolad	2018–19	Persian Gulf Pro League	7	0	0	0	0	0	0	0	7	0
Foolad	2019–20	Persian Gulf Pro League	25	1	1	0	0	0	0	0	26	1
Foolad	2020–21	Persian Gulf Pro League	19	0	1	0	7	0	0	0	27	0
Foolad	Total		51	1	2	0	7	0	0	0	60	1
Esteghlal	2021–22	Persian Gulf Pro League	8	0	1	0	1	0	0	0	10	0
Esteghlal	2025–26	Persian Gulf Pro League	5	0	0	0	1	0	1	0	7	0
Esteghlal	2026–2027	Persian Gulf Pro League	10	0	0	0	4	0	0	0	14	0
Esteghlal	Total		23	0	1	0	6	0	1	0	31	0
Foolad	2021–22	Persian Gulf Pro League	13	1	0	0	8	0	1	0	22	0
Foolad	2022–23	Persian Gulf Pro League	22	0	2	0	0	0	0	0	24	0
Foolad	Total		35	1	2	0	8	0	1	0	46	1
Tractor	2023–24	Persian Gulf Pro League	29	2	2	0	1	0	0	0	32	2
Tractor	2024–25	Persian Gulf Pro League	30	1	1	0	8	0	0	0	39	1
Tractor	Total		59	3	3	0	9	0	0	0	71	3
Career Total			180	5	9	0	33	0	2	0	224	5

=== International ===
As of match played 14 November 2026

Appearances and goals by national team and year
National team	Year	Apps	Goals
Iran	2022	1	0
Iran	2025	5	0
Iran	2026	1	0
Total		7	0

== Honours ==
Esteghlal

- Persian Gulf Pro League: 2021–22

Foolad

- Hazfi Cup: 2020–21
- Iranian Super Cup: 2021

Tractor

- Persian Gulf Pro League: 2024–25
