= 2018–19 Sepahan F.C. season =

Sepahan
2018–19 season
- Chairman: Masoud Tabesh
- Manager: (Iran) Amir Ghalenoei
- Stadium: Naghsh-e Jahan Stadium
- 18th Pro League: TBD
- 32nd Hazfi Cup: TBD
Home colours	Away colours	Third colours

The 2018–19 season was Sepahan's 18th season in the Pro League, and their 25nd consecutive season in the top division of Iranian Football and 65nd year in existence as a football club. They competed in the Hazfi Cup. Sepahan was captained by Hossein Papi.

== Kit information ==
Supplier: Start
Sponsor: Mobarakeh Steel Company

Home	Away	Third	Goalkeeper 1	Goalkeeper 2

== Players ==
Updated 20 December 2017.

starting lineup

=== First-team squad ===
Note: Flags indicate national team as defined under FIFA eligibility rules; some limited exceptions apply. Players may hold more than one non-FIFA nationality.

No.	Pos.	Nation	Player
1	GK	IRI	Payam Niazmand
2	DF	IRI	Hassan Jafari
5	DF	IRI	Ezzatollah Pourghaz
6	MF	IRI	Mehdi Kiani (Vice Captain)
7	DF	IRI	Saeid Aghaei ^{U25}
8	MF	IRI	Rasoul Navidkia (Captain)
9	FW	IRI	Sajjad Shahbazzadeh
10	FW	IRI	Mehrdad Mohammadi
11	MF	IRI	Bakhtiar Rahmani
12	MF	IRI	Reza Dehghani ^{U21}
14	MF	IRI	Milad Sarlak ^{U25}
17	MF	IRI	Jalaleddin Alimohammadi
18	FW	IRI	Mohammad Ebrahimi
20	DF	IRI	Mohammad Iranpourian
21	MF	IRI	Mohammad Karimi ^{U23}
22	GK	IRI	Amir Hossein Nikpour ^{U21}

No.	Pos.	Nation	Player
23	FW	IRI	Ali Khosravi ^{U23}
25	FW	IRI	Ali Ghorbani
30	MF	IRI	Mohsen Mosalman
33	DF	IRI	Mohammad Moslemipour ^{U23}
36	GK	IRI	Ali Keykhosravi ^{U21}
37	MF	IRI	Mohammadreza Ekhlasi ^{U23}
38	MF	IRI	Yasin Salmani ^{U21}
39	MF	IRI	Sepehr Shahin ^{U21}
44	DF	IRI	Khaled Shafiei
50	GK	IRI	Shahab Adeli ^{U23}
66	DF	IRI	Mohammadreza Mehdizadeh
70	MF	IRI	Hamed Bahiraei ^{U25}
77	MF	HUN	Vladimir Koman
78	DF	IRI	Mehdi Rahimi ^{U21}
88	FW	BRA	Kiros Stanlley
99	DF	IRI	Siavash Yazdani

- [U21 = Under 21 year player | U23 = Under 23 year player| U25 = Under 25 year player]

For recent transfers, see List of Iranian football transfers winter 2018–19.

==== Loan list ====
Note: Flags indicate national team as defined under FIFA eligibility rules; some limited exceptions apply. Players may hold more than one non-FIFA nationality.

No.	Pos.	Nation	Player
—	GK	IRI	Mehdi Amini ^{U23} (at Paykan until June 2019)
—	DF	IRI	Davoud Rajabi ^{U23} (at Gol Reyhan Alborz until June 2019)
—	MF	IRI	Mohammad Papi ^{U21} (at Naft Masjed Soleyman until June 2019)
—	FW	IRI	Reza Mirzaei ^{U23} (at Foolad until June 2019)
—	FW	IRI	Iman Zakizadeh ^{U23} (at Gol Reyhan Alborz until June 2019)

== Transfers ==
=== In ===
No.	Pos	Player	Age	From	Type	Window	Ends
1	Gk	(Iran) Payam Niazmand	22	(Iran) Paykan F.C.	Transfer	Summer	30.06.2020
20	DF	(Iran) Mohammad Iranpourian	32	(Iran) Tractor Sazi F.C.	Transfer	Summer	30.06.2020
88	FW	(Brazil) Kiros Stanlley Soares Ferraz	29	(Iran) Zob Ahan Esfahan F.C.	Transfer	Summer	30.06.2019
50	Gk	(Iran) Shahab Adeli	21	(Iran) Naft Tehran F.C.	Transfer	Summer	30.06.2021
9	FW	(Iran) Sajjad Shahbazzadeh	28	Qatar SC	Transfer	Summer	30.06.2019
44	DF	(Iran) Khaled Shafiei	30	(Iran) Zob Ahan Esfahan F.C.	Transfer	Summer	30.06.2020
6	MF	(Iran) Mehdi Kiani	31	(Iran) Tractor Sazi F.C.	Transfer	Summer	30.06.2019
21	MF	(Iran) Mohammad Karimi	22	(Iran) F.C. Khooneh be Khooneh	Transfer	Summer	30.06.2021
16	DF	(Iran) Davoud Rajabi	22	(Iran) Sepahan S.C. U21	Transfer	Summer	30.06.2021
23	FW	(Iran) Ali Khosravi	20	(Iran) Sepahan S.C. U21	Transfer	Summer	30.06.2022
11	MF	(Iran) Bakhtiar Rahmani	26	(Iran) Zob Ahan Esfahan F.C.	Transfer	Summer	30.06.2020
77	MF	(Hungary) Vladimir Koman	29	(Turkey) Adanaspor	Transfer	Summer	30.06.2020

Updated 26 August 2018.

=== OUT ===
No.	Pos	Player	Age	To	Type	Window	Ends
14	FW	(Iran) Masoud Hassanzadeh	27	(Iran) Zob Ahan Esfahan F.C.	Transfer	Summer	
20	FW	(Iran) Mehdi Sharifi	25	(Iran) Persepolis F.C.	Transfer	Summer	30.06.2020
21	MF	(Iran) Mahmoud Ghaed Rahmati	26	(Iran) Naft Masjed Soleyman F.C.	Transfer	Summer	
77	FW	(Iran) Reza Mirzaei	22	(Iran) Foolad F.C.	Loan	Summer	30.06.2019
27	Gk	(Iran) Mehdi Amini	22	(Iran) Paykan F.C.	Loan	Summer	30.06.2019
14	MF	(Iran) Ali Karimi	24	(Iran) Esteghlal F.C.	Transfer	Summer	30.06.2019
16	MF	(Albania) Edon Hasani	24	(Albania) KF Tirana	Transfer	Summer	2019
11	FW	(Iraq) Marwan Hussein	27	(Iraq) Al-Zawra'a SC	Transfer	Summer	30.06.2020
15	FW	(Iran) Saber Didehvar	22	(Iran) Naft va Gaz Gachsaran F.C.	Transfer	Summer	
55	DF	(Iran) Aref Gholami	21	(Iran) Zob Ahan Esfahan F.C.	Transfer	Summer	
66	DF	(Iran) Mohammad Ali Ahmadi	35	Retired		Summer	
35	Gk	(Iran) Mehdi Sedghian	22	(Iran) Sorkhpooshan Pakdasht F.C.	Transfer	Summer	30.06.2019
91	Gk	(Syria) Ibrahim Alma	26	(Syria) Al-Wahda	Transfer	Summer	30.06.2019

Updated 26 August 2018.

=== Current managerial staff ===
Position	Name
Manager	(Iran) Amir Ghalenoei
First team coach	(Portugal) Miguel Teixeira
Assistant coaches	(Iran) Ghasem Zaghinejad (Iran) Saeed Alhoei (Iran) Jalal Omidian
Goalkeepers coach	(Portugal) Rui Tavares
Fitness trainer	(Iran) Bayaz Pourmami
Doctor	(Iran) Mohammad Rashadi
Doctor assistant	(Iran) Asghar Majidikia
Physiotherapist	(Iran) Ali Khorami
Masseurs	(Iran) Hossein Afshardoost (Iran) Majid Fazlollahi (Iran) Hamed Bateni
Administrative manager	(Iran) Reza Fatahi
Executive manager	(Iran) Reza Fatahi

== Matches ==
=== Pro league ===
==== League table ====
Pos	Team	Pld	W	D	L	GF	GA	GD	Pts	Qualification or relegation
1	Persepolis (C)	30	16	13	1	36	14	+22	61	Qualification for 2020 AFC Champions League group stage
2	Sepahan	30	15	13	2	46	20	+26	58	Qualification for 2020 AFC Champions League group stage
3	Esteghlal	30	16	9	5	40	13	+27	57	Qualification for 2020 AFC Champions League Qualifying play-offs
4	Padideh	30	16	8	6	32	16	+16	56	Qualification for 2020 AFC Champions League Qualifying play-offs
5	Tractor Sazi	30	14	10	6	42	25	+17	52	

Source: IPL Table
Rules for classification: 1) Points; 2) Goal difference; 3) Goals scored.
(C) Champions

==== Results summary ====
Overall								Home						Away					
Pld	W	D	L	GF	GA	GD	Pts	W	D	L	GF	GA	GD	W	D	L	GF	GA	GD
17	9	8	0	31	12	+19	35	5	4	0	16	6	+10	4	4	0	15	6	+9

Last updated: 10 FEB 2019.

==== Results by round ====
Round	1	2	3	4	5	6	7	8	9	10	11	12	13	14	15	16	17	18	19	20	21	22	23	24	25	26	27	28	29	30
Ground	H	A	H	A	H	A	H	A	H	A	H	A	A	H	A	A	H	A	H	A	H	A	H	A	H	A	A	H	A	H
Result	D	W	D	W	D	D	W	W	W	W	W	D	D	W	D	D	W													
Position	10	2	3	2	2	2	3	2	2	2	2	2	2	1	1	2	1													

Updated to match(es) played on 15 December 2018. Source: flashscores.co.uk
A = Away; H = Home; W = Win; D = Draw; L = Loss

==== Matches ====
Win Draw Loss Postponed

Date Round	Home	Score	Away	Location

27 July 2018 1	Sepahan	0–0	Naft Abadan	Isfahan
20:45 UTC+03:30	Pourghaz (yellow card) 42'; Aghaei (yellow card) 71'; Mehrdad (yellow card) 80'; Bakhtiar (yellow card) 87'	Report		Stadium: Naghsh-e Jahan; Attendance: 0 Referee: Reza Mahdavi

3 August 2018 2	Sepidrood	1–6	Sepahan	Rasht
20:45 UTC+03:30		Report	Shahbazzadeh 7', 54'; Sasan 23' , 27'; Mehrdad 39'; Mehrdad (yellow card) 60'; Iranpourian 65'	Stadium: Azodi; Attendance: 3,000; Referee: Mohammad Hossein Zahedi Far

12 August 2018 3	Sepahan	0–0	Paykan	Isfahan
20:45 UTC+03:30	Kiani (yellow card) 22'; Iranpourian (yellow card) 55'; Mehrdad (yellow card) 67'	Report	Hamoudi (yellow card) 19'	Stadium: Naghsh-e Jahan; Attendance: 15,000; Referee: Ali Safaei

12 August 2018 4	Zob Ahan	1 – 2	Sepahan	Isfahan
20:15 UTC+03:30	Bou Hamdan (yellow card) 9'; Fakhreddini (yellow card) 54'; Sadeghi (yellow card) 57'; Haddadifar (yellow card) 66'; Niknafs (red card) 64'; Mosalman (yellow card) 69'; Hosseini 71'	Report	Mehrdad (yellow card) 9'; Mehrdad 25'; Pourghaz 27'; Ansari (yellow card) 56'	Stadium: Foolad Shahr; Referee: Vahid Kazemi; Assistant referee: Hassan Yousefi، Ghahreman Najafi; Fourth official:Javad Mohammadi; Esmaeil Safiri

24 August 2018 5	Sepahan	2 – 2	Tractor	Isfahan
20:00 UTC+03:30	Shahbazzadeh 35'; Kiani (yellow card) 65'; Pourghaz 89'		Stokes 73'; Esmaeilifar 90'	Stadium: Foolad Shahr; Attendance: 12,000; Referee: Hossein Zargar; Assistant referee: Reza Sokhandan، Mohammad Rahi; Fourth official:Reza Mahdavi; Alireza Kahouri

30 August 2018 6	Pars Jam	2 – 2	Sepahan	Jam
20:00 UTC+03:30	Mirjavan 2'; Seifollahi 45+1' (pen.); Seifollahi (yellow card) 50'; Salehi (yellow card) 59'	Report	Iranpourian 27'; Jafari (yellow card) 87'; Yazdani (yellow card) 90+4'; Kiros 90+5'	Stadium: Takhti; Referee: Reza Mahdavi; Assistant referee: Amir Reza Ashour Mahani، Ahad Soltani; Fourth official:Rouhollah Sharifi; Mohammad Javad Taghi Pour

21 September 2018 7	Sepahan	3 – 1	Foolad	Isfahan
19:30 UTC+03:30	Kiros 18' (pen.); Aghaei 23'; Ansari 66'; Pourghaz (yellow card) 70'; Players: Niazmand، Iranpourian، Aghaei، Pourghaz، Shafiei، Kiani، Mehrdad، Kiros، Ansari; Hamed Bahiraei (substituted off) 46' (substituted on) Sarlak; Koman (substituted off) 85' (substituted on) Karimi		Chimba 43'; Lopes (yellow card) 91'	Stadium: Foolad Shahr; Attendance: 5,000; Referee: Bijan Heidari; Assistant referee: Mehdi Alvandi، Mohammad ali Pour motaghi Fourth official:Reza Mahdavi

27 September 2018 8	Naft Masjed Soleyman	0 – 2	Sepahan	Masjed Soleyman
20:30 UTC+03:30		Report	Kiros (yellow card) 20'; Kiros 28' (76.); Koman (yellow card) 43'; Kiani (yellow card) 59'	Stadium: Behnam Mohammadi; Attendance: 5,000; Referee: Hassan Akrami; Assistant referee: Babak Abasgholi، Ali Akbar Aziempour; Fourth official:Rouhollah Sharifi

19 October 2018 9	Sepahan	3 – 2	Nassaji Mazandaran	Isfahan
16:45 UTC+03:30	Kiros 15'; Pourghaz (yellow card) 20'; Karimi (substituted off) 63' (substituted on) Aghaei; Ansari (substituted off) 72' (substituted on) Papi; Koman (substituted off) 78' (substituted on) Yazdani; Shahbazzadeh 83'; Kiros 90+6' (pen.)	Report	Ashouri 10'; Mamashli (yellow card) 38'; Jafari (yellow card) 49'; Ashouri (yellow card) 58'; Shojaei (yellow card) 81'; Faraji 90+2'	Stadium: Naghsh-e Jahan; Referee: Koupal Nazemi; Assistant referee: Arman Asaadi، Mohammad Zoraghi; Fourth official:Ali Mirghafari

26 October 2018 10	Esteghlal	0 – 1	Sepahan	Tehran
16:45 UTC+03:30	Karimi (substituted off) 17' (substituted on) Neumayr; Bagheri (yellow card) 36'; Ghaedi (substituted off) 46' (substituted on) Esmaeili; Tabrizi (substituted off) 67' (substituted on) Alhaji Gero	Report	Mehrdad (yellow card) 25'; Mehrdad (substituted off) 45' (substituted on) Sasan; Karimi (substituted off) 45' (substituted on) Yazdani; Kiani (yellow card) 71'; Pourghaz (yellow card) 77'; Kiros 81'; Koman (substituted off) 90' (substituted on) Bakhtiar	Stadium: Azadi; Attendance: 35,000; Referee: Reza Kermanshahi; Assistant referee:Sajad Touri، Yaghoub Sokhandan; Fourth official:Reza Mahdavi

9 November 2018 11	Sepahan	3 – 0	Saipa	Isfahan
16:30 UTC+03:30	Kiros 14'; Shafiei 17'; Sasan (yellow card) 45'; Bakhtiar (substituted off) 68' (substituted on) Karimi; Kiros 78'; Bahiraei (yellow card) 80'; Sasan (substituted off) 85' (substituted on) Jalal; Koman (substituted off) 90' (substituted on) Rahimi	Report	Aliyari (yellow card) 62'	Stadium: Naghsh-e Jahan; Attendance: 30,000; Referee: Alireza Faghani; Assistant referee: Ali Mirzabeigi، Hassan Yousefi; Fourth official::Amir ArabAraghi

9 December 2018 12	Sepahan	1 – 1	Persepolis	Isfahan
16:10 UTC+03:30	Yazdani (yellow card) 37'; Bahiraei (substituted off) 46' (substituted on) Shafiei; Mehrdad (substituted off) 54' (substituted on) Sasan; Pourghaz 74'; Koman (substituted off) 82' (substituted on) Bakhtiar; Kiros (yellow card) 71' (yellow-red card) 90'	Report	Alishah (substituted off) 84' (substituted on) Asadi; Alipour 89' (pen.); Kamyabinia (red card) 90'; Asadi (substituted off) 90+4' (substituted on) Rabiekhah	Stadium: Naghsh-e Jahan; Attendance: 45,000; Referee: Alireza Faghani; Assistant referee: Reza Sokhandan، MohammadReza Mansouri; Fourth official:Reza Adel

23 November 2018 13	Machine Sazi	1 – 1	Sepahan	Tabriz
15:00 UTC+03:30	Khorram Hosseini 36'; Aziz Maeboodi (yellow card) 39' (yellow-red card) 45'	Report	Aghaei (yellow card) 15'; Kiros (yellow card) 39'; Aghaei (substituted off) 46' (substituted on) Mehrdad; Bakhtiar (substituted off) 53' (substituted on) Iranpourian; Jafari (substituted off) 77' (substituted on) Jalal; Yazdani (yellow card) 84'; Koman 87'; Shafiei (yellow card) 93'	Stadium: Bonyan Diesel; Attendance: 4,000; Referee: Yaser Hamrang; Assistant referee: Ali Dodangeh، Ali Akbar Azimpour; Fourth official:Mehdi Marjanzadeh

30 November 2018 14	Sepahan	1 – 0	Padideh	Isfahan
15:15 UTC+03:30	Mehrdad 27'; Mehrdad (yellow card) 27'; Karimi (substituted off) 46' (substituted on) Bahiraei; Sasan (yellow card) 60'; Sasan (substituted off) 64' (substituted on) Jalal; Koman (substituted off) 81' (substituted on) Bakhtiar; Iranpourian (yellow card) 90+4'	Report	Moradmand (yellow card) 59'	Stadium: Naghsh-e Jahan; Attendance: 45,000; Referee: Mohammad Reza Akbarian; Assistant referee: Mehdi Alvandi، Mohammad Reza Modir Rousta; Fourth official:Reza Adel

15 December 2018 15	Esteghlal Khuzestan	1 – 1	Sepahan	Ahvaz
15:00 UTC+03:30	Kalantari (yellow card) 33'; Meysam Shahmakvand (yellow card) 33'; Meysam Karimi 36' (pen.); Meysam Karimi (yellow card) 77'; Delfi (yellow card) 86'		Sasan 27'; Aghaei (substituted off) 47' (substituted on) Shafiei; Sasan (yellow card) 64'; Jafari (substituted off) 67' (substituted on) Iranpourian; Koman (substituted off) 81' (substituted on) Dehghani; Pourghaz (yellow card) 90'	Stadium: Ghadir; Attendance: 700; Referee: Saeid Rahimi Moghadam; Assistant referee: Arman Asaadi، Hadi Tousi; Fourth official:Rouhollah Sharifi

5 February 2019 16	Naft Abadan	0 – 0	Sepahan	Abadan
16:00 UTC+03:30			Bakhtiar (substituted off) 60' (substituted on) Bahiraei; Mehrdad (substituted off) 62' (substituted on) Jalal; Koman (substituted off) 84' (substituted on) Karimi	Stadium: Takhti; Referee: Koupal Nazemi; Assistant referee: Mohammad Reza Mansouri، Jalil Sharani; Fourth official

10 February 2019 17	Sepahan	3 – 0	Sepidrood	Isfahan
17:15 UTC+03:30	Mosalman (substituted off) 45' (substituted on) Mehrdad; Ghorbani 50'; Mehrdad 57'; Ghorbani (substituted off) 59' (substituted on) Bahiraei; Kiros 87'; Aghaei (substituted off) 88' (substituted on) Mehdizadeh			Stadium: Naghsh-e Jahan; Attendance: 0 Referee: Mehdi MarjanZadeh; Assistant referee: Ali Akbar Azimpour، Mohammad Hashemi Nasab, Rouhollah Sharifi, Hossein Zamani; Fourth official:Farhad Moraveji

== Statistics ==
=== Squad statistics ===
As of 30 August 2018

No.	Pos	Nat	Player	Total		Pro League		Hazfi Cup	
No.	Pos	Nat	Player	Apps	Goals	Apps	Goals	Apps	Goals
1	GK	(Iran) IRI	Payam Niazmand	6	0	6	0	0	0
2	DF	(Iran) IRI	Hassan Jafari	1	0	1	0	0	0
3	FW	(Iran) IRI	Sasan Ansari	6	2	6	2	0	0
5	DF	(Iran) IRI	Ezzatollah Pourghaz	6	2	6	2	0	0
6	MF	(Iran) IRI	Mehdi Kiani	6	0	6	0	0	0
7	DF	(Iran) IRI	Saeid Aghaei	6	0	6	0	0	0
8	MF	(Iran) IRI	Rasoul Navidkia	0	0	0	0	0	0
9	FW	(Iran) IRI	Sajjad Shahbazzadeh	6	3	6	3	0	0
10	FW	(Iran) IRI	Mehrdad Mohammadi	6	2	6	2	0	0
11	MF	(Iran) IRI	Bakhtiar Rahmani	4	0	4	0	0	0
12	MF	(Iran) IRI	Reza Dehghani	2	0	2	0	0	0
14	MF	(Iran) IRI	Milad Sarlak	1	0	1	0	0	0
15	DF	(Iran) IRI	Davoud Rajabi	0	0	0	0	0	0
17	MF	(Iran) IRI	Jalaleddin Alimohammadi	1	0	1	0	0	0
20	DF	(Iran) IRI	Mohammad Iranpourian	6	1	6	1	0	0
21	MF	(Iran) IRI	Mohammad Karimi	5	0	5	0	0	0
23	FW	(Iran) IRI	Ali Khosravi	0	0	0	0	0	0
36	GK	(Iran) IRI	Ali Keykhosravi	0	0	0	0	0	0
40	FW	(Iran) IRI	Iman Zakizadeh	0	0	0	0	0	0
44	DF	(Iran) IRI	Khaled Shafiei	2	0	2	0	0	0
47	MF	(Iran) IRI	Hossein Papi	3	0	3	0	0	0
50	GK	(Iran) IRI	Shahab Adeli	0	0	0	0	0	0
70	MF	(Iran) IRI	Hamed Bahiraei	0	0	0	0	0	0
77	MF	(Hungary) HUN	Vladimir Koman	1	0	1	0	0	0
78	DF	(Iran) IRI	Mehdi Rahimi	0	0	0	0	0	0
88	FW	(Brazil) BRA	Kiros Stanlley	6	1	6	1	0	0
99	DF	(Iran) IRI	Siavash Yazdani	6	0	6	0	0	0

=== Goals ===
As of 24 August 2018

Rank	Player	Position	Pro League	Hazfi Cup	Other^{1}	Total
1	(Iran) Sajjad Shahbazzadeh	FW	3	0	3	6
2	(Iran) Sasan Ansari	FW	2	0	0	2
3	(Iran) Mehrdad Mohammadi	FW	2	0	4	6
4	(Iran) Ezzatollah Pourghaz	DF	2	0	0	2
5	(Brazil) Kiros Stanlley	FW	0	0	2	2
6	(Iran) Jalaleddin Alimohammadi	MF	0	0	2	2
7	(Iran) Mohammad Iranpourian	DF	1	0	0	1
8	(Iran) Hassan Jafari	DF	0	0	1	1
Own goals			0	0	0	0
Total			10	0	12	22

^{1} Exhibition game.

=== Clean sheets ===
As of 26 May 2018

Rank	Name	Pro League	Hazfi Cup	Other^{1}	Total
1	(Iran) Payam Niazmand	2	0	5	7
2	(Iran) Shahab Adeli	0	0	0	0
2	(Iran) Ali Keykhosravi	0	0	0	0
Total		2	0	7	9

^{1} Exhibition game.
