= 2019–20 Sepahan S.C. season =

Sepahan
2019–20 season
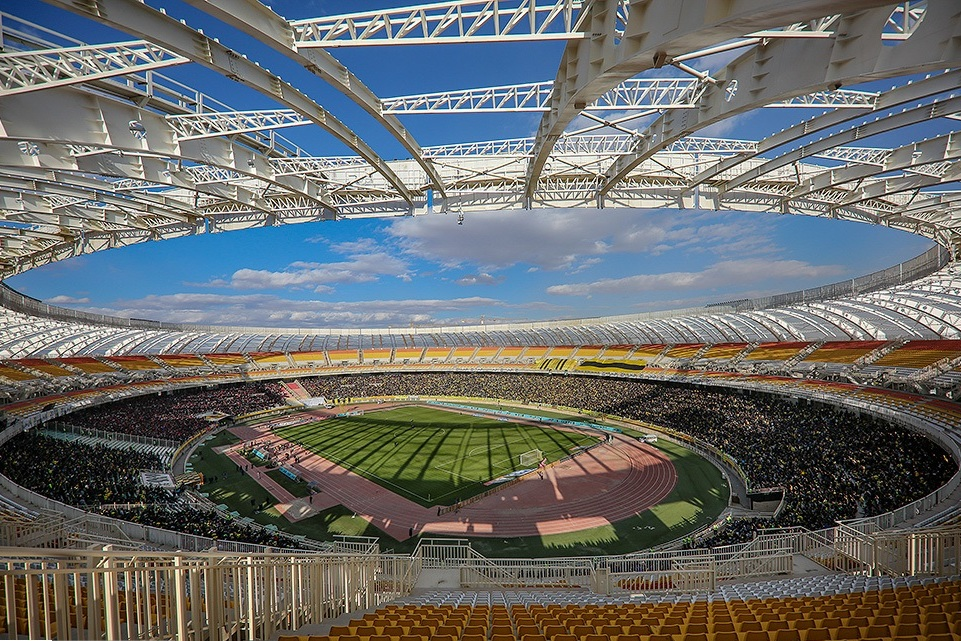
- Naghsh-e Jahan Stadium in Iran-Derby
- Chairman: mohammadreza saket
- Manager: Amir Ghalenoei; Moharram Navidkia
- Stadium: Naghsh-e Jahan Stadium
Home colours	Away colours	Third colours

The 2019–20 season is Sepahan's 66th season in existence, and their 39th consecutive season in the top flight of Iran football. It is also the club's 19th consecutive season in the Persian Gulf Pro League. The club will compete in the Persian Gulf Pro League, Hazfi Cup, and AFC Champions League.

== First-team squad ==
As it stands on 8 October 2019

Squad No.	Name	Nationality	Position(s)	Date of birth (age)	Apps	Goals	Assists	Signed from
Goalkeepers
1	Payam Niazmand	(Iran)	GK	6 April 1995 (age 31)	53	0	0	(Iran) Paykan
50	Shahab Adeli	(Iran)	GK	19 January 1997 (age 29)	0	0	0	(Iran) Naft Tehran
36	Ali Keykhosravi	(Iran)	GK	13 January 1999 (age 27)	2	0	0	(Iran) Sepahan Academy
22	Amir Hossein Nikpour	(Iran)	GK	23 November 1998 (age 27)	0	0	0	(Iran) Sepahan Academy
Defenders
2	Mohammad Iranpourian	(Iran)	RB	21 September 1985 (age 41)				(Iran) Tractor
5	Ezzatollah Pourghaz	(Iran)	CB/DM	21 March 1987 (age 39)				(Iran) Saipa
7	Saeid Aghaei	(Iran)	LB/RW	9 February 1995 (age 31)				(Iran) Tractor
37	Morteza Mansouri	(Iran)	RB/LB/RW	23 June 1990 (age 36)				(Iran) Shahr Khodro
66	Mohammadreza Mehdizadeh	(Iran)	CB/RB	18 February 1994 (age 32)				(Iran) Tractor
69	Shayan Mosleh	(Iran)	CB/LB	25 June 1993 (age 33)				(Iran) Persepolis
78	Mehdi Rahimi	(Iran)	CB/RB	2 May 1999 (age 27)				(Iran) Sepahan Academy
Midfielders
6	Mehdi Kiani(2nd captain)	(Iran)	CM/CDM/CAM	10 January 1987 (age 39)				(Iran) Tractor
8	Rasoul Navidkia (captain)	(Iran)	CM/CDM/CAM	21 December 1983 (age 42)				(Iran) Sepahan Academy
10	Mohammad Reza Hosseini	(Iran)	CM/CAM/RAM	15 September 1989 (age 37)				(Iran) Zob Ahan
11	Mohsen Mosalman	(Iran)	CM/AM	21 January 1991 (age 35)				(Iran) Zob Ahan
19	Omid Noorafkan	(Iran)	CM/DM	9 April 1997 (age 29)				(Belgium) Charleroi
21	Mohammad Karimi	(Iran)	CM/AM/	20 July 1996 (age 30)				(Iran) Khooneh Be Khooneh
23	Ali Khosravi	(Iran)	CM/AM	13 January 1999 (age 27)				(Iran) Sepahan Academy
24	Alireza Naghizadeh	(Iran)	CM	3 March 1993 (age 33)				(Iran) Tractor
30	Giorgi Gvelesiani	(Georgia (country))	CM/LM/LW/LB	5 May 1991 (age 35)				(Iran) Nassaji Mazandaran
70	Hamed Bahiraei	(Iran)	CM	12 June 1995 (age 31)				(Iran) Sepahan Academy
77	Vladimir Koman	(Hungary)	CM	16 March 1989 (age 37)				(Turkey) Adanaspor
Forwards
9	Sajjad Shahbazzadeh	(Iran)	ST/AM	23 January 1990 (age 36)				Qatar SC
14	Abolfazl Akasheh	(Iran)	FW	9 March 1999 (age 27)				(Iran) Sepahan Academy
17	Reza Mirzaei	(Iran)	LW/FW	16 April 1996 (age 30)				(Iran) Sepahan Academy
21	Ali Babaei	(England)	FW	1 April 2003 (age 23)				(Iran) Sepahan Academy
20	Mohammad Mohebi	(Iran)	ST	18 April 1995 (age 31)				(Iran) Shahin Bushehr
25	Ali Ghorbani	(Iran)	ST	18 September 1990 (age 36)				(Slovakia) Spartak Trnava
88	Kiros Stanlley Soares Ferraz	(Brazil)	ST	18 April 1995 (age 31)				(Iran) Zob Ahan

== Transfers and loans ==
=== Transfers in ===
Entry date	Position	No.	Player	From club	Fee	Ref.
01 Jul 2019	Defender - right-back	37	(Iran) Morteza Mansouri	(Iran) Shahr Khodro	400,000 €	
01 Jul 2019	Forward - right winger	10	(Iran) Mohammad Reza Hosseini	(Iran) Zob Ahan	600,000 €	
01 Jul 2019	Forward - left winger	20	(Iran) Mohammad Mohebi	(Iran) Shahin Bushehr	100,000 €	
01 Jul 2019	Defender - centre-back	30	(Georgia (country)) Giorgi Gvelesiani	(Iran) Nassaji Mazandaran	400,000 €	
30 Jun 2019	Defender - centre-back	17	(Iran) Reza Mirzaei	(Iran) Foolad	350,000 €	
01 Jul 2019	Forward - left winger	14	(Iran) Abolfazl Akashe	(Iran) Arvand Kh	50,000 €	
01 Jul 2019	Midfielder - central midfield	24	(Iran) Alireza Naghizadeh	(Iran) Tractor	400,000 €	
01 Jul 2019	Defender - left-back	69	(Iran) Shayan Mosleh	(Iran) Persepolis	350,000 €	
20 Aug 2019	Midfielder - defensive midfield	19	(Iran) Omid Noorafkan	(Belgium) Charleroi	700,000 €	
Total					3,350,000 €	

=== Transfers out ===
Exit date	Position	No.	Player	To club	Fee	Ref.
1 July 2019	Forward - centre-forward	10	(Iran) Mehrdad Mohammadi	(Portugal) Aves	800,000 €	
1 July 2019	Forward - centre-forward	18	(Iran) Mohammad Ebrahimi	(Iran) Pars Jam	200,000 €	
1 July 2019	Defender - centre-back	99	(Iran) Siavash Yazdani	(Iran) Esteghlal	500,000 €	
09 Aug 2019	Defender - left-back	33	(Iran) Mohammad Moslemipour	(Iran) Machine Sazi	100,000 €	
1 July 2019	Forward - right winger	17	(Iran) Jalaleddin Alimohammadi	(Iran) Paykan	350,000 €	
1 July 2019	Defender - right-back	2	(Iran) Hassan Jafari	(Iran) Nassaji Mazandaran	350,000 €	
1 July 2019	Midfielder - defensive midfield	14	(Iran) Milad Sarlak	(Iran) Nassaji Mazandaran	350,000 €	
12 Jul 2019	Midfielder - attacking midfield	11	(Iran) Bakhtiar Rahmani	(Qatar) Al-Shamal	350,000 €	
12 Jul 2019	Defender - centre-back	44	(Iran) Khaled Shafiei	Without Club	500,000 €	
12 Jul 2019	Forward - centre-forward	40	(Iran) Iman Zakizadeh	Without Club	75,000 €	
Total					3,575,000 €	

=== Loans out ===
Start date	End date	Position	No.	Player	To club	Fee	Ref.
1 July 2019	30 Jun 2020	Midfielder - attacking midfield	12	(Iran) Reza Dehghani	(Iran) Nassaji Mazandaran	150,000 €	
06 Aug 2019	30 Jun 2020	Midfielder - defensive midfield	25	(Iran) Mohammad Papi	(Iran) Gol Reyhan	100,000 €	
11 Aug 2019	30 Jun 2020	Defender - left-back	16	(Iran) Davoud Rajabi	(Iran) Baadraan	50,000 €	
19 Aug 2019	30 Jun 2020	Midfielder - central midfield	90	(Iran) Mohammad Zeynali	(Iran) Gol Gohar	150,000 €	
Total						450,000 €	

== Pre-season ==
Win Draw Loss Postponed

Date Round	Home	Score	Away	Location

6 July 2019 1	Shahr Khodro (Iran)	1–2	(Iran) Sepahan	Mashhad, Iran
	Mehdikhani	Report	Hosseini; Mirzaei	Stadium: Manzel Abad

11 July 2019 2	Baadraan (Iran)	2–3	(Iran) Sepahan	Tehran, Iran
	Goal		Ghorbani; Sajjad

13 July 2019 3	Paykan (Iran)	1–3	(Iran) Sepahan	Tehran, Iran
	Goal		Mirzaei; Hosseini; Salmani

22 July 2019 4	Gazişehir (Turkey)	۰–۱	(Iran) Sepahan	Istanbul, Turkey
			Mohebi

25 July 2019 ۵	Bursaspor (Turkey)	0–3	(Iran) Sepahan	Istanbul, Turkey
			Iranpourian; Hosseini; Mirzaei

26 July 2019 6	Gençlerbirliği (Turkey)	0–4	(Iran) Sepahan	Istanbul, Turkey
			Ghorbani; Rajabi

2 August 2019 7	Sepahan (Iran)	1–1	(Iran) Gol Gohar	Isfahan, Iran
	(o.g.)		Goal

3 August 2019 8	Sepahan (Iran)	2–1	(Iran) Sepahan U21	Isfahan, Iran
	Mohebi; Ghorbani		Goal

13 August 2019 9	Sepahan (Iran)	0–1	(Iran) Nassaji	Isfahan, Iran
			Goal

14 August 2019 10	Sepahan (Iran)	5–1	(Iran) Sepahan U21	Isfahan, Iran
	Mirzaei; Mansouri; Ghorbani; Kiros; Nasr		Goal

7 September 2019 11	Sepahan (Iran)	1–2	(Iran) Shahr Khodro	Isfahan, Iran
	Mehdi Kiani		Goal

== Competitions ==
=== Overall ===
Competition	Started round	Current position / round	Final position / round	First match	Last match
Persian Gulf Pro League	—	—		19 September 2019	
Hazfi Cup	—	—		30 September 2019	
AFC Champions League	—	—			

Updated to match played 09 September 2019
Source: Competitions

=== Overview ===
Competition	First match	Last match	Starting round	Record							
Competition	First match	Last match	Starting round	Pld	W	D	L	GF	GA	GD	Win %
Persian Gulf Pro League	19 September 2019			7	5	2	0	10	0	+10	71.43
Hazfi Cup	30 September 2019		1/16	1	1	0	0	3	0	+3	100.00
AFC Champions League				0	0	0	0	0	0	+0	—
Total				8	6	2	0	13	0	+13	75.00

Last updated: 21 October 2019.
Source: Competitions

=== Pro League ===
==== Results summary ====
Overall								Home						Away					
Pld	W	D	L	GF	GA	GD	Pts	W	D	L	GF	GA	GD	W	D	L	GF	GA	GD
19	9	9	1	29	11	+18	36	6	3	0	16	3	+13	3	6	1	13	8	+5

Last updated: 6 February 2020.

==== Results by matchday ====
Matchday	1	2	3	4	5	6	7	8	9	10	11	12	13	14	15	16	17	18	19	20	21	22	23	24	25	26	27	28	29	30
Ground	A	H	A	H	A	H	A	H	A	H	A	H	A	A	H	H	A	H	A	H	A	H	A	H	A	H	A	H	H	A
Result	W	W	D	D	W	W	W	D	D	W	D	D	D	W	W	L	D	W	D											
Position	1	1	2	2	1	1	1	2	2	2	2	1	2	2	2	2	2	2	2											

Updated to match(es) played on 6 February 2020. Source: Premier League
A = Away; H = Home; W = Win; D = Draw; L = Loss

==== Matches ====
Win Draw Loss Postponed

Date Round	Home	Score	Away	Location

24 August 2019 1	Shahin	0–3	Sepahan	Bushehr
20:15 UTC+03:30	Safarzadeh (yellow card) 23'; Saremi (yellow card) 36'		Pourghaz (yellow card) 36'; Mosalman (substituted off) 46' (substituted on) Noorafkan; Koman 57'; Mohebi 62'; Noorafkan (yellow card) 72'; Koman (substituted off) 76' (substituted on) Mirzaei; Mirzaei 83'; Karimi (substituted off) 85' (substituted on) Mohebi	Stadium: Mahdavi; Attendance: 15,000; Referee: Vahid Kazemi; Assistant referee: حسن ظهیری، Ali Akbar Azimpour; Ali Bay، Hossein Ziari; Fourth official:Hadi Tousi; Game Supervisor:Rahim Rahimi Moghadam

29 August 2019 2	Sepahan	1–0	Machine Sazi	Isfahan
20:00 UTC+03:30	Ghorbani 20'; Sajjad (yellow card) 57'; Ghorbani (substituted off) 61' (substituted on) Kiros; Mohebi (substituted off) 66' (substituted on) Mirzaei; Gvelesiani (penalty missed); Kiros (yellow card) 85'; Mirzaei (substituted off) 92' (substituted on) Mosleh		Khoramhosseini (yellow card) 93'	Stadium: Naghsh-e Jahan; Referee: Hassan Akrami; Assistant referee Hassan Zahiri، Hadi Tousi; Saad Vafapisheh، Keyvan Alimohammadi; Fourth official:Milad Ghasemi; Game Supervisor:Mohammadjavad Taghipour

14 September 2019 3	Foolad	0–0	Sepahan	Ahvaz
19:45 UTC+03:30	Aghasi (yellow card) 15'; Ghaseminejad (yellow card) 70'; Jafari (yellow card) 79'; Bagherpour (yellow card) 93'		Kiani (yellow card) 36'; Gvelesiani (yellow card) 36'; Ghorbani (substituted off) 45' (substituted on) Kiros; Mohebi (yellow card) 79'; Noorafkan (substituted off) ۸۴' (substituted on) Mirzaei	Stadium: Foolad Arena; Attendance: 1,180; Referee: Payam Heydari; Assistant referee: Ali Mirzabeygi، Rahim Shahin; Hossein Zamani، Iman Kahish; Fourth official:Mahdi Alvandi; Game Supervisor:Alireza Kahouri

20 September 2019 4	Sepahan	0–0	Naft Masjed Soleyman	Isfahan
19:30 UTC+03:30	Aghaei (yellow card) 13'; Hosseini (substituted off) 64' (substituted on) Sajjad; Aghaei (substituted off) 75' (substituted on) Ghorbani		Makani (yellow card) 90'; Noormohammadi (yellow card) 90'	Stadium: Naghsh-e Jahan; Attendance: 7,600; Referee: Seyed Mehdi Seyed Ali; Assistant referee Ali Akbar Nouri، Mohammad Rasoul Zoraghi; Mohammad Bagher pour Bagher Ali Ebrahimi; Fourth official:Ali Ahmadi; Game Supervisor:Hatam Bakpour

26 September 2019 5	Persepolis	0–2	Sepahan	Tehran
16:15 UTC+03:30	Amiri (yellow card) 20'; Nemati (yellow card) 32'; Kanaani (yellow card) 43'; Beiranvand (yellow card) 74'; Júnior (substituted off) 77' (substituted on) Bashar Resan; Nemati (substituted off) 78' (substituted on) Mahini; Mohammad Naderi (substituted off) 82' (substituted on) Abdi; Bashar Resan (yellow card) 90'; Shoja' (yellow card) 94'		Kiani (yellow card) 43'; Noorafkan (yellow card) 52'; Hosseini (substituted off) 52' (substituted on) Mohebi; Gvelesiani (yellow card) 54'; Koman (substituted off) 64' (substituted on) Ghorbani; Kiros 81'; Mohebi 84'; Mosleh (substituted off) 86' (substituted on) Mehdizadeh	Referee: Vahid Kazemi; Assistant referee Reza Sokhandan، Alireza Ildrom; Mehdi Seyed Ali، Ali Safaei; Fourth official:Amir reza Ashour Mahani; Game Supervisor:Fereydoun Esfahanian

4 October 2019 6	Sepahan	2–0	Zob Ahan	Isfahan
17:05 UTC+03:30	Sajjad (yellow card) 1'; Kiros (yellow card) 34'; Kiani (yellow card) 40'; Hosseini (substituted off) 46' (substituted on) Mehdizadeh; Gvelesiani 51'; Koman (substituted off) 63' (substituted on) Ghorbani; Kiros 66'; Mansouri (yellow card) 84'; Ghorbani (yellow card) 87'; Sajjad (substituted off) 88' (substituted on) Mirzaei		Bou Hamdan (substituted off) 4' (substituted on) Pahlavan	Stadium: Naghsh-e Jahan; Referee: Mo'oud Bonyadifar; Assistant referee: حسن ظهیری، Hassan Yousefi علی بای، Mohammad Bagherpour; Fourth official:BaratAli Molavi; Game Supervisor:Alireza Kahouri

21 October 2019 7	Gol Gohar	0–2	Sepahan	Sirjan
16:30 UTC+03:30	Mehrdad Abdi (yellow card) 29'; Tarhani (yellow card) 47' (red card) 93'		Kiani (yellow card) 15'; Shahbazzadeh 27'; Hosseini (substituted off) 81' (substituted on) Ghorbani; Noorafkan (substituted off) 85' (substituted on) Mehdizadeh; Mohebi (yellow card) 89'; Ghorbani 93'	Stadium: Imam Ali; Referee: Javad Rahimzadeh; Assistant referee: Ali Mirzabeygi، Jalil Sha'rani; Ali Mirghafari، Mohammad Hossein Torabian; Fourth official:Mohammad Ali Rezaei; Game Supervisor:Nader Jafari

25 October 2019 8	Sepahan	0–0	Saipa	Isfahan
16:45 UTC+03:30	Kiros (yellow card) 45+3'; Noorafkan (yellow card) 72'	Report		Stadium: Naghsh-e Jahan; Referee: (Iran) Ali Safaei

31 October 2019 9	Pars Jam	1–1	Sepahan	Jam
18:00 UTC+03:30	Nouri (yellow card) 45+4' (goal) 45+5' (pen.); Hatami (yellow card) 59'; Gerami (yellow card) 60'	Report	Mosleh (yellow card) 36'; Mirzaei 38' (yellow card) 68'; Mohebi (yellow card) 46' (yellow-red card) 87'; Aghaei (yellow card) 56'; Hosseini (yellow card) 90+7'	Stadium: Takhti; Referee: (Iran) Mehdi Seyedali

5 November 2019 10	Sepahan	2–0	Tractor	Isfahan
15:30 UTC+03:30	Kiani (yellow card) 13'; Shahbazzadeh 44' (yellow card) 90+4'; Kiros 51'; Mirzaei (yellow card) 90+4'	Report	Asadi (yellow card) 86'; Mazaheri (yellow card) 90+4'	Stadium: Naghsh-e Jahan; Referee: (Iran) Vahid Kazemi

30 November 2019 12	Sepahan	2–2	Esteghlal	Isfahan
15:00 UTC+03:30	Gvelesiani 14'; Shahbazzadeh (yellow card) 60'; Aghaei (yellow card) 90+2'; Noorafkan 90+5'	Report	Ghayedi 57'; Diabaté 79'	Stadium: Naghsh-e Jahan; Referee: (Iran) Mohammad Hossein Zahedifar

5 December 2019 13	Nassaji	2 –2	Sepahan	Qaem Shahr
16:00 UTC+03:30	Abbaszadeh 57'; Mamashli 66' (yellow card) 67'	Report	Noorafkan 2'; Mehizadeh 69'	Stadium: Vatani; Referee: (Iran) Mohammadreza Akbarian

9 December 2019 14	Shahr Khodro	1–1	Sepahan	Mashhad
17:00 UTC+03:30	Frashad Mohammadi (yellow card) 80'; Younes Faraji 89'	Report	Mohebi (yellow card) 53' (yellow-red card) 68'; Gvelesiani 60'; Kiani (yellow card) 66'; Koman (yellow card) 72'	Stadium: Imam Reza; Referee: (Iran) Bijan Heydari

13 December 2019 15	Sepahan	2–0	Paykan	Isfahan
16:40 UTC+03:30	Gvelesiani 21' (pen.); Noorafkan 45+2'; Mirzaei (yellow card) 50'	Report	Mousavi (yellow card) 20'	Stadium: Naghsh-e Jahan; Referee: (Iran) Reza Mahdavi

19 December 2019 16	Sepahan	5–0	Shahin Bushehr	Isfahan
16:25 UTC+03:30	Mohebi 22'; Kiros 30' 42' 76'; Karimi 86'		Luka Gadrani (red card) 18'; Maleki (yellow card) 45'; Behrooz Norouzifard (yellow card) 66'	Stadium: Naghsh-e Jahan; Referee: (Iran) Hossein Zamani

28 December 2019 11	Sanat Naft	4–2	Sepahan	Abadan
16:45 UTC+03:30	Alekasir 7'; Ahle Shakheh (yellow card) 50' (goal) 70'; Ghoreishi 52'; Reykani 82' (yellow card) 82'; Motlaghzadeh (yellow card) 86'	Report	Shahbazzadeh 28'; Hosseini (yellow card) 30' (goal) 41'; Kiani (yellow card) 86'	Stadium: Takhti; Referee: (Iran) Ali Baay

25 January 2020 17	Machine Sazi	0–0	Sepahan	Tabriz
15:00 UTC+03:30	Maeboodi (yellow card) 65'; Ali Alekasir (yellow card) 90+3'	Report	Ghorbani (yellow card) 45+4'; Rafiei (yellow card) 50'; Tayyebi (yellow card) 70'; Noorafkan (yellow card) 79'	Stadium: Bonyan Diesel; Referee: (Iran) Amir Arab Baraghi

31 January 2020 18	Sepahan	2–1	Foolad	Isfahan
17:00 UTC+03:30	Kiros 5' (yellow card) 81'; Mosleh (yellow card) 31'; Noorafkan (yellow card) 39'; Mohebi 63'	Report	Heydarieh (yellow card) 24'; Gordan (yellow card) 45'; Aghasi (yellow card) 45'; Najjarian (yellow card) 45'; Beyt Saeed 80'; Jafari (yellow card) 85'; Coulibaly (yellow card) 90'	Stadium: Naghsh-e Jahan; Referee: (Iran) Mooud Bonyadifar

6 February 2020 19	Naft Masjed Soleyman	0–0	Sepahan	Masjed Soleyman
16:00 UTC+03:30	Naghizadeh (yellow card) 69'	Report	Mosleh (yellow card) 66'; Koman (yellow card) 68'; Shahbazadeh (yellow card) 90+2'	Stadium: Behnam Mohammadi; Referee: (Iran) Mohammad Torabian

23 February 2020 20	Sepahan	0–3	Persepolis	Isfahan
17:00 UTC+03:30		Summary		Stadium: Naghsh-e Jahan

27 February 2020 21	Zob Ahan	1–1	Sepahan	Isfahan
17:00 UTC+03:30	Pahlavan (yellow card) 11'; Bjedov 90+1' (pen.)	Summary	Torkaman 4'	Stadium: Foolad Shahr; Referee: (Iran) Bijan Heydari

June 29 2020 22	Sepahan	2–0	Gol Gohar	Isfahan
17:00 UTC+03:30	Hosseini 9'; Karimi 31' (pen.); Mehdizadeh (yellow card) 42'	Summary	Zendehrouh (yellow card) 80'	Stadium: Naghsh-e Jahan; Referee: (Iran) Amir Arab Baraghi

5 July 2020 23	Saipa	v	Sepahan	Qods
21:00 UTC+03:30				Stadium: Shahr-e Qods

11 July 2020 24	Sepahan	v	Pars Jam	Isfahan
21:45 UTC+03:30				Stadium: Naghsh-e Jahan

17 July 2020 25	Tractor	v	Sepahan	Tabriz
20:15 UTC+03:30				Stadium: Yadegar

23 July 2020 26	Sepahan	v	Sanat Naft	Isfahan
21:45 UTC+03:30				Stadium: Naghsh-e Jahan

29 July 2020 27	Esteghlal	v	Sepahan	Tehran
21:00 UTC+03:30				Stadium: Azadi

26 April 2020 28	Sepahan	v	Nassaji	Isfahan
18:00 UTC+03:30				Stadium: Naghsh-e Jahan

30 April 2020 29	Sepahan	v	Shahr Khodro	Isfahan
21:00 UTC+03:30				Stadium: Naghsh-e Jahan

10 May 2020 30	Paykan	v	Sepahan	Qods
21:00 UTC+03:30				Stadium: Shahr-e Qods

=== Hazfi Cup ===
==== Matches ====
Win Draw Loss Postponed

Date Round	Home	Score	Away	Location

30 September 2019 1/16	Kheybar	0–3	Sepahan	Khorramabad
16:30 UTC+03:30			Mansouri 10'; Mirzaei (substituted off) 62' (substituted on) Hosseini; Karimi (substituted off) ۶۳' (substituted on) Aghaei; Mansouri (yellow card) 68'; Kiani 80'; Ghorbani 83'; Mansouri (substituted off) 85' (substituted on) Mehdizadeh	Stadium: Takhti; Attendance: 18.000

== Squad statistics ==
=== Goals ===
As of match played 21 October 2019

Rank	Pos.	No.	Player	League	Hazfi	AFC	Friendly	Total
1	FW	25	(Iran) Ali Ghorbani	2	1	0	7	10
2	FW	17	(Iran) Reza Mirzaei	1	0	0	4	5
3	FW	20	(Iran) Mohammad Mohebi	2	0	0	2	4
4	MF	10	(Iran) Mohammad Reza Hosseini	0	0	0	3	3
4	FW	88	(Brazil) Kiros Stanlley	2	0	0	1	3
5	DF	37	(Iran) Morteza Mansouri	0	1	0	1	2
5	MF	6	(Iran) Mehdi Kiani	0	1	0	1	2
5	MF	9	(Iran) Sajjad Shahbazzadeh	1	0	0	1	2
6	MF	77	(Hungary) Vladimir Koman	1	0	0	0	1
6	DF	30	(Georgia (country)) Giorgi Gvelesiani	1	0	0	0	1
6	DF	2	(Iran) Mohammad Iranpourian	0	0	0	1	1
Own Goals				0	0	0	0	0
Total				10	3	0	21	35
