= 2017–18 Sepahan F.C. season =

Sepahan
2017–18 season
- Chairman: Mohsen Taheri
- Manager: (Croatia) Zlatko Kranjčar (Iran) Karim Ghanbari (Temporary) (Iran) Mansour Ebrahimzadeh
- Stadium: Naghsh-e Jahan Stadium
- 17e Pro League: 14
- 31e Hazfi Cup: Round of 16
Home colours	Away colours	Third colours

The 2017–18 season was Sepahan's 17th season in the Pro League, and their 24nd consecutive season in the top division of Iranian Football and 64th year in existence as a football club. They competed in the Hazfi Cup. Sepahan was captained by Hossein Papi.

== Players ==
=== First-team squad ===
Note: Flags indicate national team as defined under FIFA eligibility rules; some limited exceptions apply. Players may hold more than one non-FIFA nationality.

No.	Pos.	Nation	Player
1	GK	BRA	Lee Oliveira
2	DF	IRI	Hassan Jafari
3	FW	IRI	Sasan Ansari
5	DF	IRI	Ezzatollah Pourghaz
6	MF	IRI	Milad Sarlak^{U23}
7	DF	IRI	Saeid Aghaei ^{U25}
8	MF	IRI	Rasoul Navidkia
9	FW	IRI	Shahin Saghebi
10	FW	IRI	Mehrdad Mohammadi
11	MF	IRQ	Marwan Hussein
12	MF	IRI	Ali Karimi
13	FW	IRI	Reza Dehghani ^{U21}
14	FW	IRI	Masoud Hassanzadeh
15	FW	IRI	Saber Didehvar^{U23}
16	MF	ALB	Edon Hasani

No.	Pos.	Nation	Player
17	MF	IRI	Jalaleddin Alimohammadi
18	MF	IRI	Amin Jahan Alian
21	MF	IRI	Mahmoud Ghaed Rahmati
27	GK	IRI	Mehdi Amini ^{U23}
33	MF	BRA	Jairo Rodrigues
34	MF	IRI	Mehdi Rahimi
35	GK	IRI	Mehdi Sedghian ^{U23}
36	GK	IRI	Ali Keykhosravi ^{U21}
37	MF	IRI	Hossein Fazeli
47	MF	IRI	Hossein Papi (Captain)
50	MF	BRA	Rafael Crivellaro
55	DF	IRI	Aref Gholami ^{U21}
70	MF	IRI	Hamed Bahiraei ^{U21}
77	DF	IRI	Reza Mirzaei ^{U21}

- [U21 = Under 21 year player | U23 = Under 23 year player| U25 = Under 25 year player]

For recent transfers, see List of Iranian football transfers summer 2017.

=== Current managerial staff ===
Position	Name
Manager	(Croatia) Zlatko Kranjčar (en of 20 january 2018) (Iran) Mansour Ebrahimzadeh
First team coach	(Iran) Karim Ghanbari
Assistant coaches	(Iran) Mahmoud Karimi
Goalkeepers coach	(Croatia) Tonci Mrduljas
Fitness trainer	(Brazil) Rafael Fogageiro
Doctor	(Iran) Mohammad Rashadi
Doctor assistant	(Iran) Asghar Majidikia
Physiotherapist	(Iran) Hamid Sedighi
Masseurs	(Iran) Ali Mousavi
Administrative manager	(Iran) Reza Fatahi
Executive manager	(Iran) Reza Fatahi

== Matches ==
=== Pro league ===
==== League table ====
Pos	Team	Pld	W	D	L	GF	GA	GD	Pts	Qualification or relegation
12	Est. Khuzestan	30	7	10	13	25	42	−17	31	
13	Sepidrood	30	8	6	16	24	39	−15	30	
14	Sepahan	30	6	11	13	31	34	−3	29	
15	Naft Tehran (R)	30	5	9	16	23	41	−18	24	Relegation to the 2018–19 Azadegan League
16	Meshki Pooshan (R)	30	2	9	19	17	48	−31	15	Relegation to the 2018–19 Azadegan League

Updated to match(es) played on April 13, 2018. Source: IPL Stats, Soccerway
Rules for classification: 1) Points; 2) Goal difference; 3) Goals scored.
(R) Relegated

==== Results summary ====
Overall								Home						Away					
Pld	W	D	L	GF	GA	GD	Pts	W	D	L	GF	GA	GD	W	D	L	GF	GA	GD
30	6	11	13	31	34	−3	29	4	7	4	17	11	+6	2	4	9	14	23	−9

Last updated: 11 August 2018.

==== Results by round ====
Round	1	2	3	4	5	6	7	8	9	10	11	12	13	14	15	16	17	18	19	20	21	22	23	24	25	26	27	28	29	30
Ground	H	A	H	A	H	A	H	A	H	A	H	A	A	H	A	A	H	A	H	A	H	A	H	A	H	A	A	H	A	H
Result	D	L	D	W	D	L	D	L	W	D	L	W	L	D	L	D	W	D	L	L	L	L	D	W	W	L	D	D	L	L
Position	11	13	14	10	10	13	12	14	10	12	13	8	11	12	12	12	12	12	12	12	13	13	13	11	11	11	11	12	14	14

Updated to match(es) played on 11 August 2018. Source: flashscores.co.uk
A = Away; H = Home; W = Win; D = Draw; L = Loss
