= List of Sepahan S.C. seasons =

This is a list of seasons played by Sepahan Football Club in Iranian and Asian football, from 1974 to the most recent completed season. It details the club's achievements in major competitions, and the top scorers for each season. Top scorers in bold were also the top scorers in the Iranian league that season.

== Seasons ==
Season	League									Hazfi Cup	Asia	Leagues Top goalscorer		Manager
Season	Division	P	W	D	L	F	A	Pts	Pos	Hazfi Cup	Asia	Name	Goals	Manager
1971-72	LL	14	4	3	7	12	18	11	5th	**Not held**				Yavari
1972-73	Div 2	3	2	1	0	4	1	5	**1st**	**Not held**				Yavari
1974-75	TJC	22	4	6	12	10	27	14	10th	**Not held**				Yavari
1975-76	TJC	30	8	10	12	24	27	26	11th	1/8 Final				Yavari
1976-77	TJC	30	5	14	11	20	30	24	14th					Yavari
1977-78	TJC	30	7	12	11	21	31	26	13th	**Not held**				Rajkov/ Yavari
1978–79	Div 2	13	5	7	1	15	11	17	Did not finish	**Not held**				Rajkov
1981-82	IL	12	8	2	2	19	9	18	**2nd**					
1982-83	IL	12	9	2	1	25	8	20	**1st**					Tabesh
1983-84	IL	12	6	5	1	15	10	17	4th					Tabesh
1984-85	IL	12	5	6	1	17	4	16	5th					Tabesh
1985-86	IL	**Did not finish**												Tabesh
1986-87	IL	**Not held**												Tabesh
1987-88	IL													Tabesh
1988-89	IL	14	12	1	1	24	4	25	**1st**					Tabesh
1989-90	QL	20	6	8	6	16	16	20	7th					Tabesh
1989-90	IL	12	6	4	2	20	10	16	**2nd**					Tabesh
1990-91	IL	4	2	2	0	8	1	6	**1st**					Tabesh
1991-92	Div 1	22	9	4	9	20	30	22	6th					Tabesh
1992–93	Div 2	26	12	8	6	31	25	34	2nd	**Not held**				Tabesh
1993–94	Div 1	26	7	8	11	16	26	22	11th					Karimi
1994–95	Div 1	22	8	6	8	28	25	22	6th					Hejazi
1995–96	Div 1	30	11	9	10	40	34	42	5th					Yavari
1996–97	Div 1	30	14	8	8	37	29	50	3rd					Korbekandi
1997–98	Div 1	28	9	10	9	24	25	37	6th	**Not held**				Korbekandi
1998–99	Div 1	30	13	14	3	38	19	53	3rd	1/4 Final		Majid Basirat	10	Monajati
1999–2000	Div 1	26	11	9	6	28	19	42	4th	Semifinal		Levon Stepanyan	7	Nadimian
2000–01	Div 1	22	5	11	6	19	23	26	7th	1/16 Final		Mousavi	4	Nadimian
2001–02	IPL	26	7	11	8	22	22	32	9th	Semifinal		Edmond Bezik	6	Poklepović
2002–03	IPL	26	16	4	6	47	27	52	**1st**	Semifinal		**Edmond Bezik**	**13**	Kazemi
2003–04	IPL	26	11	6	9	47	36	39	6th	**Champion**	Group stage	Rasoul Khatibi	8	Kazemi
2004–05	IPL	30	7	14	9	30	33	35	10th	1/8 Final	Group stage	Rasoul Khatibi	14	Kazemi; Pourmehdi; Poklepović
2005–06	IPL	30	12	7	11	38	32	43	7th	**Champion**	Did not qualify	Rasoul Khatibi	10	Tavares; Bonačić
2006–07	PGL	30	14	7	9	41	28	49	5th	**Champion**	Final	E. Mohammed	9	Bonačić
2007–08	PGL	34	17	10	7	53	38	58	2nd	Quarterfinal	Group stage	Mahmoud Karimi	9	Bonačić; Vieira
2008–09	PGL	34	14	14	6	46	34	56	4th	1/8 Final	Group stage	E. Mohammed	14	Firat; Charkhabi; Kazemi
2009–10	PGL	34	19	10	5	67	30	67	**1st**	1/8 Final	Group stage	**E. Mohammed**	**19**	Ghalenoei
2010–11	PGL	34	18	12	4	56	29	66	**1st**	Quarter-Final	Quarter-Final	Ibrahima Touré	18	Ghalenoei
2011–12	PGL	34	19	10	5	54	27	67	**1st**	Round of 32	Quarter-Final	E. Mohammed	9	Bonačić; Kranjcar
2012–13	PGL	34	19	7	8	60	33	64	3rd	**1st**	Group stage	Khalatbari	13	Kranjcar
2013–14	PGL	30	14	12	4	36	20	54	4th	Round of 16	Group stage	Mehdi Sharifi	9	Kranjcar
2014–15	PGL	30	17	8	5	46	27	59	**1st**	Round of 16	Did not qualify	Mehdi Sharifi	12	Kranjcar; Faraki
2015–16	PGL	30	8	14	8	29	30	38	11th	Quarter-Final	Group stage	Khalatbari; Chimba	4	Faraki; Navidkia; Štimac; Zaghinejad
2016–17	PGL	30	12	9	9	38	34	45	5th	Quarter-Final	—	Masoud Hassanzadeh; Mehrdad Mohammadi	7	Veisi; Kranjčar
2017–18	PGL	30	6	11	13	31	34	29	14th	1/16 Final	—	Sasan Ansari	11	Kranjčar; Ghanbari; Ebrahimzadeh
2018–19	PGL	30	15	13	2	46	20	58	2nd	Semi-Final	—	**Kiros Stanlley**	**16**	Ghalenoei
2019–20	PGL	30	12	13	5	39	22	49	5th	Quarter-Final	Group stage	Kiros Stanlley	7	Ghalenoei; Teixeira*
**Total**		**964**	**378**	**324**	**262**	**1213**	**921**	**1348**						

=== Key ===
- P = Played
- W = Games won
- D = Games drawn
- L = Games lost
- F = Goals for
- A = Goals against
- Pts = Points
- Pos = Final position
- CWC = Asian Cup Winners Cup
- ACL = AFC Champions League
- LL = Local League
- TJC = Takht Jamshid Cup
- IL = Isfahan League
- QL = Qods League
- Div 1 = Azadegan League
- IPL = Iran Pro League
- PGL = Persian Gulf Pro League

Champions	Runners-up	3rd place	4th place	Promoted	Relegated

== See also ==
- Sepahan
- Takht Jamshid Cup
- Azadegan League
- Iran Pro League
- Hazfi Cup
