= Morteza Mansouri =

Iranian footballer

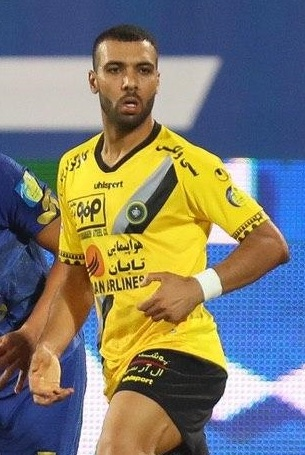

Personal information
- Date of birth: 23 June 1990 (age 36)
- Place of birth: Shoush, Iran
- Height: 1.81 m (5 ft 11 in)
- Position: Right back

Team information
- Current team: Havadar
- Number: 37

Senior career*
Years	Team	Apps	(Gls)
2012–2013	Hafari Ahvaz	21	(0)
2014–2016	Esteghlal Ahvaz	6	(0)
2016	Khoneh Be Khoneh	12	(1)
2016–2019	Padideh	53	(1)
2019–2021	Sepahan	37	(0)
2021–2022	Nassaji	26	(0)
2022–2023	Mes Rafsanjan	1	(0)
2023–	Havadar	52	(0)
- * Club domestic league appearances and goals as of 21 April 2025

Morteza Mansouri (Persian: مرتضی منصوری; born 23 June 1990) is an Iranian footballer who plays for Havadar in the Persian Gulf Pro League.

Mansouri played for Hafari Ahvaz in the Azadegan League making 21 appearances for them. He made his debut in the Persian Gulf League for Esteghlal Ahvaz on 26 September 2015 in a home defeat to Gostaresh Foolad Tabriz.

== Club career ==
=== Sepahan ===
- Last Update:7 September 2019

Club performance			League		Cup		Continental		Total	
Season	Club	League	Apps	Goals	Apps	Goals	Apps	Goals	Apps	Goals
Iran			League		Hazfi Cup		Asia		Total	
2019–20	Sepahan	Iran Pro League	15	0	2	1	2	0	19	1
Career total			15	0	2	1	2	0	19	1
