= Iman Zakizadeh =

Iranian footballer

Personal information
- Full name: Iman Zakizadeh
- Date of birth: 8 June 1996 (age 30)
- Place of birth: Isfahan, Iran
- Height: 1.82 m (6 ft 0 in)
- Position: Center forward

Team information
- Current team: Gol Reyhan Alborz

Youth career
- 2013–2017: Sepahan

Senior career*
| Years | Team | Apps | (Gls) |
| 2014–2017 | Sepahan B | 38 | (10) |
| 2017– | Sepahan | 2 | (0) |
| 2019– | → Gol Reyhan (loan) | 0 | (0) |

International career
| 2014–2016 | Iran U20 | 7 | (1) |
- * Club domestic league appearances and goals as of 4 March 2018

Iman Zakizadeh (born 8 June 1996) is an Iranian footballer who plays as a center forward for Gol Reyhan Alborz in the Azadegan League.

He made his Iran Pro League debut on 23 February 2018 against Siah Jamegan.

== Club career statistics ==
- Last Update: 4 March 2018

| Club performance | | | League | | Cup | | Continental | | Total | |
| Season | Club | League | Apps | Goals | Apps | Goals | Apps | Goals | Apps | Goals |
| Iran | | | League | | Hazfi Cup | | Asia | | Total | |
|---|---|---|---|---|---|---|---|---|---|---|
| 2017–18 | Sepahan | Iran Pro League | 2 | 0 | 0 | 0 | - | - | 2 | 0 |
| 2018–19 | Sepahan | Iran Pro League | 0 | 0 | 0 | 0 | - | - | 0 | 0 |
| Career total | | | 2 | 0 | 0 | 0 | 0 | 0 | 2 | 0 |
