= Saber Didehvar =

Iranian footballer

Personal information
- Full name: Saber Didehvar صابر دیده‌ور
- Date of birth: 26 December 1995 (age 30)
- Place of birth: Dehdasht, Iran
- Positions: Left midfielder; left back

Team information
- Current team: Naft va Gaz Gachsaran

Youth career
- Keshavar Dehdasht
- Naft va Gaz Gachsaran
- Sepahan

Senior career*
Years	Team	Apps	(Gls)
2014–2016	Sepahan U21	38	(17)
2016–2018	Sepahan	8	(2)
2019–	Al-Bahri		

International career
2014–2015	Iran U16	5	(1)
- * Club domestic league appearances and goals as of 20 January 2019

Saber Didehvar (Persian: صابر دیده‌ور; born 26 December 1995 in Dehdasht) is an Iranian footballer who played as a left midfielder or left back for Al-Bahri in the Iraqi Premier League.

He made his first Persian Gulf Pro League debut on 9 December 2016 against Saba Qom.

== Club career statistics ==
- Last Update:9 December 2016
