= Jalal Omidian =

Iranian footballer

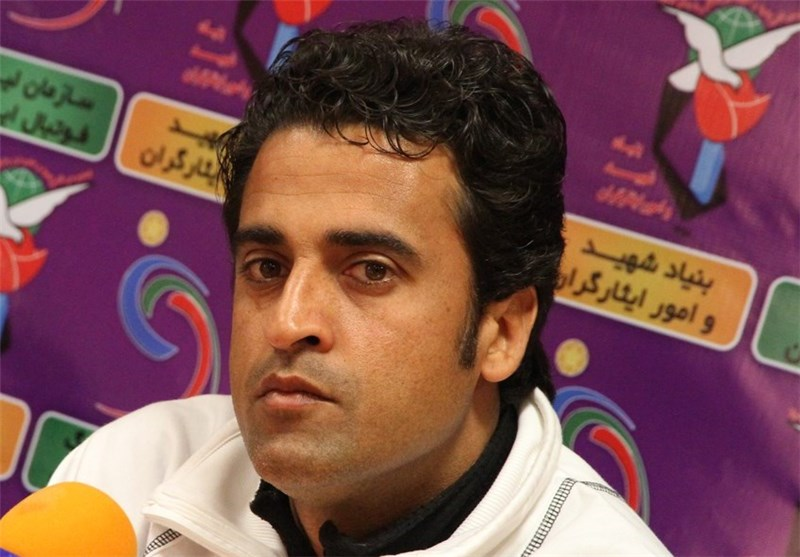
- Omidian in 2022

Personal information
- Full name: Jalal Omidian
- Date of birth: March 21, 1978 (age 48)
- Place of birth: Iran
- Position: Midfielder

Team information
- Current team: Zob Ahan (manager)

Senior career*
Years	Team	Apps	(Gls)
2006–2007	Paykan	10	(0)
2007–2009	Mes Kerman	55	(2)
2009–2010	Zob Ahan	12	(0)

International career^{‡}
	Iran	1	(0)

Managerial career
- 2014–2018: Zob Ahan (assistant)
- 2018–2020: Sepahan (assistant)
- 2020–2021: Gol Gohar Sirjan (assistant)
- 2021–2023: Paykan (assistant)
- 2023–2024: Aluminium Arak (assistant)
- 2024–2025: Sepahan (assistant)
- 2024: Sepahan (caretaker)
- 2025–2026: Kheybar Khorramabad (assistant)
- 2026–: Zob Ahan
- * Club domestic league appearances and goals as of 3 June 2010 (UTC) ‡ National team caps and goals as of 13 May 2010

Jalal Omidian (Persian: جلال امیدیان;born March 21, 1978) is an Iranian football coach and former player who most recently manages Zob Ahan.

== Club career ==
Omidian last played for Zob Ahan.

=== Club Career Statistics ===
Last Update 3 June 2010

Club performance			League		Cup		Continental		Total	
Season	Club	League	Apps	Goals	Apps	Goals	Apps	Goals	Apps	Goals
Iran			League		Hazfi Cup		Asia		Total	
2006–07	Paykan	Persian Gulf Cup	10	0			-	-		
2007–08	Mes	Persian Gulf Cup	32	2	1	0	-	-	33	2
2008–09	Mes	Persian Gulf Cup	23	0			-	-		
2009–10	Zob Ahan	Persian Gulf Cup	12	0			0	0		
Total	Iran		77	2			0	0		
Career total			77	2			0	0		

- Assist Goals

Season	Team	Assists
09–10	Zob Ahan	0
