= Khaled Shafiei =

Iranian footballer (born 1987)

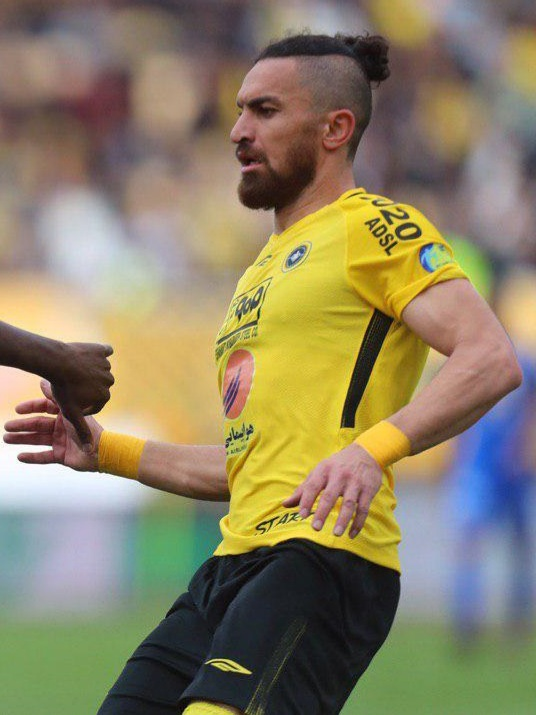

Personal information
- Date of birth: 29 January 1987 (age 39)
- Place of birth: Nurabad, Iran
- Height: 1.84 m (6 ft 0 in)
- Position: Defender

Youth career
- 2008–2009: Shahrdari Zanjan

Senior career*
Years	Team	Apps	(Gls)
2009–2010	Kowsar	19	(0)
2010–2013	Fajr Sepasi	82	(1)
2013	Naft Tehran	7	(0)
2013–2014	Gostaresh Foulad	23	(0)
2014–2017	Tractor	68	(3)
2017	FC Seoul	2	(0)
2018	Zob Ahan	9	(0)
2018–2019	Sepahan	13	(1)
2019	Machine Sazi	0	(0)
2020	Saipa	12	(0)
2020–2022	Bashundhara Kings	35	(4)
- * Club domestic league appearances and goals

Khaled Shafiei (Persian: خالد شفیعی; born 29 January 1987) is an Iranian former football defender.

== Career ==
Shafiei joined Fajr Sepasi in 2010 after spending the previous season in Kowsar.

He joined FC Seoul on 25 June 2017, becoming the first Iranian player in K League.

== Club career statistics ==
As of 12 April 2019

Club performance			League		Cup		Continental		Total	
Season	Club	League	Apps	Goals	Apps	Goals	Apps	Goals	Apps	Goals
2009–10	Kowsar	Division 1	19	0			—		19	0
2010–11	Fajr Sepasi	Division 1	27	1			—		27	1
2011–12	Fajr Sepasi	Pro League	30	0			—		30	0
2012–13	Fajr Sepasi	Pro League	25	0			—		25	0
2013–14	Gostaresh Foulad	Pro League	23	0			—		23	0
2014–15	Tractor	Pro League	22	0	0	0	6	0	28	0
2015–16	Tractor	Pro League	18	3	1	0	8	0	27	3
2016–17	Tractor	Pro League	28	0	6	0	0	0	34	0
2017	FC Seoul	K League	2	0	0	0	—	–	2	0
2017–18	Zob Ahan	Pro League	9	0	0	0	6	0	15	0
2018–19	Sepahan	Pro League	13	1	1	0	—		14	1
Career total			216	5	8	0	20	0	244	5

== Honours ==
Tractor

- Persian Gulf Pro League runner-up: 2014–15

Bashundhara Kings

- Bangladesh Federation Cup: 2020–21
