= Shahab Adeli =

Iranian football player

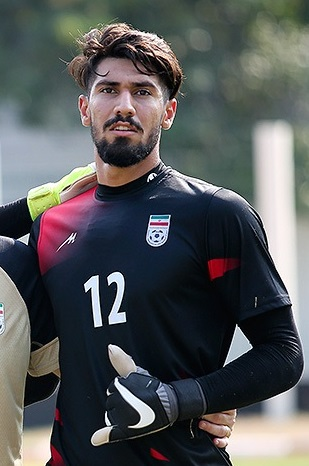

Personal information
- Date of birth: 19 January 1997 (age 29)
- Place of birth: Tehran, Iran
- Height: 1.97 m (6 ft 6 in)
- Position: Goalkeeper

Team information
- Current team: Nika Pars Chaloos
- Number: 50

Youth career
- –2015: Saba Qom
- 2015–2017: Moghavemat Tehran

Senior career*
Years	Team	Apps	(Gls)
2017–2018	Naft Tehran	7	(0)
2018–2020	Sepahan	0	(0)
2020–2021	Baaderaan	6	(0)
2021–2022	Nassaji	0	(0)
2022–2023	Shohadaye Razakan Alborz		
2023–2024	Kavir Moghava		
2024–2025	Sepidrood		
2025–	Nika Pars Chaloos		

International career^{‡}
2016–2017	Iran U20	6	(0)
2018–2019	Iran U23	4	(0)
- * Club domestic league appearances and goals as of 31 May 2022 ‡ National team caps and goals as of 6 March 2017

Shahab Adeli (Persian: شهاب عادلی; born 19 January 1997) is an Iranian football player who plays as a goalkeeper for Nika Pars Chaloos in League 2.

== Club career ==
=== Sepahan ===
- Last Update:27 August 2019

Club performance			League		Cup		Continental		Total	
Season	Club	League	Apps	Goals	Apps	Goals	Apps	Goals	Apps	Goals
Iran			League		Hazfi Cup		Asia		Total	
2018–19	Sepahan	Iran Pro League	0	0	0	0	0	0	0	0
2019–20	Sepahan	Iran Pro League	0	0	0	0	0	0	0	0
Career total			0	0	0	0	0	0	0	0
