= Mohammadreza Mehdizadeh =

Iranian footballer (born 1994)

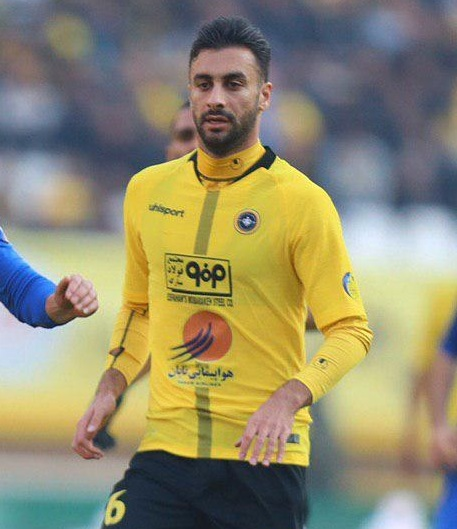
- Mehdizadeh with Sepahan in 2020

Personal information
- Full name: Mohammadreza Mehdizadeh
- Date of birth: February 18, 1994 (age 32)
- Place of birth: Rasht, Iran
- Height: 1.88 m (6 ft 2 in)
- Positions: Centre-back; right-back

Team information
- Current team: Esteghlal Khuzestan
- Number: 66

Youth career
- 2014–2015: Damash Gilan

Senior career*
| Years | Team | Apps | (Gls) |
| 2015–2016 | Damash Gilan | 27 | (0) |
| 2016–2019 | Tractor | 56 | (3) |
| 2019–2022 | Sepahan | 49 | (3) |
| 2023–2024 | Nassaji | 9 | (0) |
| 2024–2025 | Mes Rafsanjan | 28 | (0) |
| 2025– | Esteghlal Khuzestan | 30 | (1) |
- * Club domestic league appearances and goals as of 19 March 2021 ‡ National team caps and goals as of 6 March 2017

Mohammadreza Mehdizadeh (born February 19, 1994) is an Iranian professional footballer who plays as a defender for Esteghlal Khuzestan.

== Club career statistics ==
| Club | Division | Season | League | | Hazfi Cup | | Asia | | Total | |
| Club | Division | Season | Apps | Goals | Apps | Goals | Apps | Goals | Apps | Goals |
|---|---|---|---|---|---|---|---|---|---|---|
| Damash | Division 1 | 2014–15 | 3 | 0 | 0 | 0 | – | – | 3 | 0 |
| Damash | Division 1 | 2015–16 | 24 | 0 | 0 | 0 | – | – | 24 | 0 |
| Tractor | PGL | 2016–17 | 20 | 1 | 5 | 0 | – | – | 25 | 1 |
| Tractor | PGL | 2017–18 | 27 | 2 | 3 | 0 | 6 | 0 | 36 | 0 |
| Tractor | PGL | 2018–19 | 9 | 0 | 0 | 0 | 0 | 0 | 9 | 0 |
| Sepahan | PGL | 2018–19 | 10 | 0 | 0 | 0 | 0 | 0 | 10 | 0 |
| Sepahan | PGL | 2019–20 | 11 | 1 | 2 | 0 | 0 | 0 | 13 | 1 |
| Career total | | | 104 | 4 | 10 | 0 | 6 | 0 | 120 | 4 |
