= 1973–74 Iran 2nd Division =

Iran Football's 2nd Division
- Season: 1973–74
- Champions: Sepahan

The following is the standings of the Iran Football's 1973–74 football season. Sepahan were crowned the champions.

== League standings ==
=== Group A ===
Pos	Team	Pld	W	D	L	GF	GA	GD	Pts	Qualification
1	Sepahan	3	2	1	0	4	1	+3	5	Final
2	Iran Novin Kerman	3	1	1	1	2	2	0	3	
3	Arya Mashhad	3	0	3	0	2	2	0	3	
4	Taj Shiraz	3	0	1	2	0	2	−2	0 (Note: 1 point deducted?)	

=== Group B ===
Pos	Team	Pld	W	D	L	GF	GA	GD	Pts	Qualification
1	Gomrok Ahvaz	3	3	0	0	8	2	+6	6	Final
2	Tractor Sazi	3	1	1	1	4	4	0	3	
3	Niro Kermanshah	3	0	2	1	1	4	−3	2	
4	Taj Sari	3	0	1	2	2	5	−3	1	

== Final ==
Sepahan	2–2	Gomrok Ahvaz

Isfahan

Gomrok Ahvaz	0–0 (3–4)(p)	Sepahan

Ahvaz

Sepahan promoted to 1976–77 Takht Jamshid Cup

== See also ==
- 1974–75 Takht Jamshid Cup
