= Mehdi Amini =

Iranian football goalkeeper

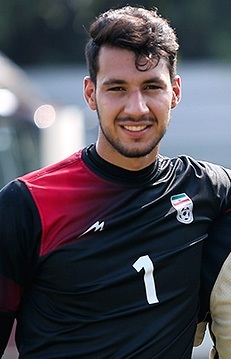

Personal information
- Full name: Mehdi Amini zazerani
- Date of birth: 16 May 1998 (age 28)
- Place of birth: Falavarjan, Iran
- Height: 1.97 m (6 ft 6 in)
- Position: Goalkeeper

Team information
- Current team: Khujand

Youth career
- –2012: Sepahan

Senior career*
Years	Team	Apps	(Gls)
2012–2018	Sepahan	13	(0)
2018–2021	Paykan	17	(0)
2021	Machine Sazi	3	(0)
2021	Zob Ahan	6	(0)
2022–2023	Tractor	0	(0)
2023–	Khujand	9	(0)

International career^{‡}
2011–2013	Iran U17	20	(0)
2013–2014	Iran U20	17	(0)
2018–2020	Iran U23	12	(0)
- * Club domestic league appearances and goals as of 3 October 2021 ‡ National team caps and goals as of 30 November 2016

Mehdi Amini (Persian: مهدی امینی; born 16 May 1998) is an Iranian professional footballer who plays as a goalkeeper for Tajikistan Higher League club Khujand.

== Club career ==
=== Sepahan ===
Amini started in the Sepahan youth system and signed a professional contract with the club in the summer of 2016. Amini made his professional debut in 2016 in an Iranian Hazfi Cup match. He made his Persian Gulf Pro League debut on 24 November 2016 in a 1–1 draw against Foolad.

== Club career statistics ==
- Last Update:1 December 2016

Club performance			League		Cup		Continental		Total					
Season	Club	League	Apps	Goals	Apps	Goals	Apps	Goals	Apps	Goals				
Iran											League	Hazfi Cup	Asia	Total
2016–17	Sepahan	Iran Pro League	12	0	5	0	0	0	9	0				
2017–18	Sepahan	Iran Pro League	16	0	0	0	0	0	0	0				
Career total			12	0	5	0	0	0	9	0				
