= Ali Khosravi =

Iranian football referee (born 1961)

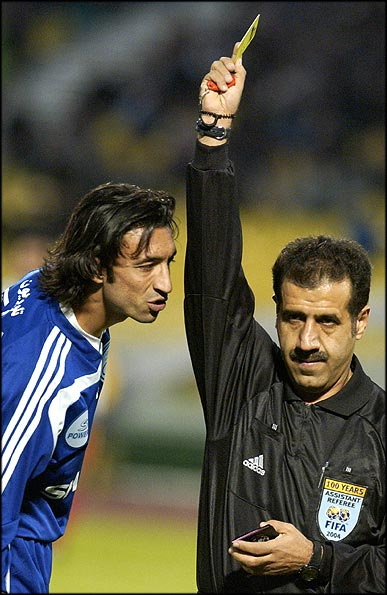
- Full name: Ali Khosravi
- Born: January 1, 1961 (age 65); Iran

International
Years	League	Role
1990s–2000s	FIFA-listed	Referee

Ali Khosravi (born 1961) is an Iranian international association football (soccer) referee. He was a referee for the final of the 2004 AFC Champions League between Al-Ittihad and Seongnam FC. Khosravi was also a referee for 2004 Summer Olympics, 2000 AFC Asian Cup and 1999 FIFA World Youth Championship.
