= Aziz Maeboodi =

Iranian footballer

Personal information
- Date of birth: 20 February 1987 (age 39)
- Place of birth: Bandar Anzali, Iran
- Height: 1.77 m (5 ft 10 in)
- Position: Defender

Team information
- Current team: Etehad Fuman

Youth career
- Malavan

Senior career*
Years	Team	Apps	(Gls)
2009–2016	Malavan	87	(1)
2016–2018	Sanat Naft	19	(0)
2018–2020	Gostaresh Foulad	44	(2)
2020–2021	Aluminium Arak	4	(0)
2021–2022	Paykan	2	(0)
2022–2023	Panik	16	(1)
2023–2024	Kesht va Sanat		
2024–	Etehad Fuman		
- * Club domestic league appearances and goals as of 23 April 2023

Aziz Maeboodi (born 20 February 1987) is an Iranian footballer who plays for Etehad Fuman.

== Club career ==
Maeboodi has played the first years of his career with Malavan.

=== Club career statistics ===
As of 8 August 2014

Club performance			League	
Season	Club	League	Apps	Goals
Iran			League	
2009–10	Malavan	Pro League	5	0
2010–11	Malavan	Pro League	14	1
2011–12	Malavan	Pro League	12	0
2012–13	Malavan	Pro League	18	0
2013–14	Malavan	Pro League	11	0
2014–15	Malavan	Pro League	27	0
Career total			87	1
