= Ghasem Zaghinejad =

Iranian footballer and manager (born 1955)

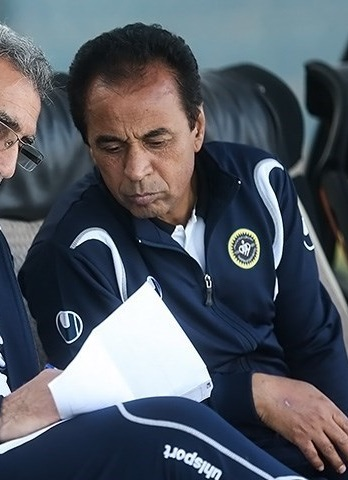

Personal information
- Full name: Ghasem Zaghinejad
- Date of birth: 25 August 1958 (age 68)
- Place of birth: Isfahan, Iran
- Position: Midfielder

Team information
- Current team: Sepahan (assistant coach)

Youth career
- 1971–1973: Sepahan

Senior career*
Years	Team	Apps	(Gls)
1973–1980	Sepahan		
1980–1984	Polyacryl		

Managerial career
- 1990–1993: Polyacryl (youth)
- 1993–1995: Polyacryl B
- 1995–1998: Polyacryl (assistant)
- 1998–2000: Polyacryl
- 2002–2004: Sepahan (youth)
- 2004–2009: Sepahan Novin
- 2009–2011: Sepahan (assistant)
- 2012–2014: Sepahan Novin
- 2014–2016: Sepahan (assistant)
- 2016: Sepahan (interim)
- 2018–: Sepahan (assistant)
- * Club domestic league appearances and goals

Ghasem Zaghinejad (born 14 March 1955 in Isfahan) is an Iranian football manager who is currently assistant manager of Sepahan. He was appointed as the head coach of Sepahan until the end of the season on 22 April 2016 after resignation of Igor Štimac. Previously, he was the assistant coach of the club under Štimac and former manager, Hossein Faraki. He was also in the same position from 2009 until 2011 under head coach Amir Ghalenoei. He is a former player of Sepahan and led the club's B team, Sepahan Novin for the years and help the club to secure multiple promotions.

== Statistics ==
As of 13 May 2016

Team	From	To					
Team	From	To	G	W	D	L	Win %
Sepahan	April 2016	May 2016	5	2	0	3	40.00
Total			5	2	0	3	40.00
