= Ali Keykhosravi =

Iranian footballer (born 1999)

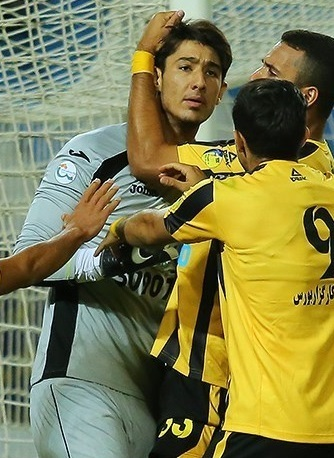

Personal information
- Full name: Ali Keykhosravi
- Date of birth: January 13, 1999 (age 27)
- Place of birth: Isfahan, Iran
- Height: 2.02 m (6 ft 8 in)
- Position: Goalkeeper

Team information
- Current team: Sepahan

Youth career
- 2013–2017: Sepahan

Senior career*
Years	Team	Apps	(Gls)
2017–2023	Sepahan	2	(0)

International career
2017–2021	Iran U20	6	(0)
- * Club domestic league appearances and goals as of 19 March 2021

Ali Keykhosravi (born January 13, 1999) is an Iranian football goalkeeper who played for Iranian club Sepahan in the Persian Gulf Pro League.

== Club career ==
Keykhosravi spent his youth career at Sepahan and joined the first team in July 2017. He made his debut on 11 August 2017 against Pars Jonoubi Jam, coming on as a second-half substitute and immediately saving a penalty kick. The match finished 1–1.

- Last Update:27 August 2019

Club performance			League		Cup		Continental		Total	
Season	Club	League	Apps	Goals	Apps	Goals	Apps	Goals	Apps	Goals
Iran			League		Hazfi Cup		Asia		Total	
2017–18	Sepahan	Iran Pro League	1	0	0	0	0	0	1	0
2018–19	Sepahan	Iran Pro League	0	0	0	0	0	0	0	0
2019–20	Sepahan	Iran Pro League	0	0	0	0	0	0	0	0
Career total			1	0	0	0	0	0	1	0
