= Hossein Zamani =

Footballer (born 2002)

Personal information
- Date of birth: 23 November 2002 (age 23)
- Place of birth: Mashhad, Iran
- Height: 1.75 m (5 ft 9 in)
- Position: Forward

Youth career
- 2010–2019: Ajax
- 2019–2021: Genoa

Senior career*
Years	Team	Apps	(Gls)
2021	Telstar	0	(0)
2021–2022	NEC	0	(0)
2024	Gioiese	12	(2)
2025	Altona East Phoenix		
2025–2026	Zvijezda 09	1	(0)

International career^{‡}
2017	Netherlands U15	1	(0)
2023	Afghanistan U23	1	(0)
2021–	Afghanistan	13	(2)
- * Club domestic league appearances and goals as of 12 May 2026 ‡ National team caps and goals as of 14 October 2025

Hossein Zamani (Dari: حسین زمانی; born 23 November 2002) is a professional footballer who plays as a forward. Born in Iran, he plays for the Afghanistan national team.

== Club career ==
Born in Iran, Zamani moved to Nieuwegein in 2010. He joined youth academy of Ajax at the age of eight.

In August 2019, Zamani moved to youth academy of Italian club Genoa. He joined Telstar in February 2021, where he signed his first professional contract.

In February 2024, Zamani joined Italian Serie D club Gioiese.

== International career ==
Zamani is a former Dutch youth international. In January 2017, Netherlands under-15 team coach Peter van der Veen included him in the squad for friendlies against Ireland. On 31 January, he played his only match for the team in a 5–1 win against Ireland.

In April 2021, Zamani received maiden call-up to Afghanistan national team. He made his debut on 25 May 2021 by scoring a goal in a 3–2 friendly win against Indonesia.

== Career statistics ==
=== International ===
As of match played 14 October 2025

Appearances and goals by national team and year
National team	Year	Apps	Goals
Afghanistan	2021	3	2
Afghanistan	2023	2	0
Afghanistan	2024	3	0
Afghanistan	2025	5	0
Total		13	2

Scores and results list Afghanistan's goal tally first, score column indicates score after each Zamani goal.

List of international goals scored by Hossein Zamani
No.	Date	Venue	Opponent	Score	Result	Competition
1	25 May 2021	Jebel Ali Centre of Excellence, Dubai, United Arab Emirates	Indonesia	3–0	3–2	Friendly
2	15 June 2021	Jassim bin Hamad Stadium, Doha, Qatar	India	1–1	1–1	2022 FIFA World Cup qualification
