= Mehdi Rahimi (footballer) =

Iranian footballer

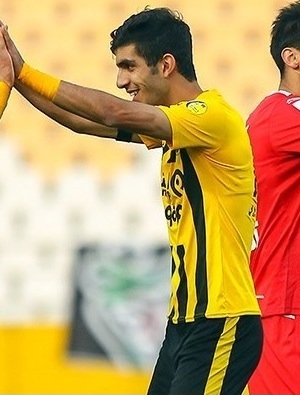

Personal information
- Full name: Mehdi Rahimi
- Date of birth: 2 May 1999 (age 27)
- Place of birth: Isfahan, Iran
- Height: 1.86 m (6 ft 1 in)
- Positions: Centre-back; left-back

Team information
- Current team: Juventud de Torremolinos
- Number: 24

Youth career
- 2013–2017: Sepahan

Senior career*
Years	Team	Apps	(Gls)
2017–2020	Sepahan	12	(1)
2020	→ Nassaji (loan)	1	(0)
2020–2021	Machine Sazi	4	(0)
2021–	Juventud de Torremolinos	0	(0)

International career
2015–2017	Iran U20	12	(1)
2018—	Iran U23	1	(0)
- * Club domestic league appearances and goals as of 24 May 2018

Mehdi Rahimi (born 2 May 1999) is an Iranian footballer who plays as a defender for Juventud de Torremolinos in the Segunda División RFEF.

He made his Iran Pro League debut on 13 October 2017 against Siah Jamegan.

== Club career statistics ==
- Last Update:21 November 2017

Club performance			League		Cup		Continental		Total	
Season	Club	League	Apps	Goals	Apps	Goals	Apps	Goals	Apps	Goals
Iran			League		Hazfi Cup		Asia		Total	
2017–18	Sepahan	Iran Pro League	8	0	0	0	-	-	10	1
2018–19	Sepahan	Iran Pro League	2	0	0	0	-	-	2	0
2019–20	Sepahan	Iran Pro League	0	0	0	0	0	0	0	0
Career total			12	1	0	0	0	0	12	1
