= Mohammad Karimi =

Iranian footballer

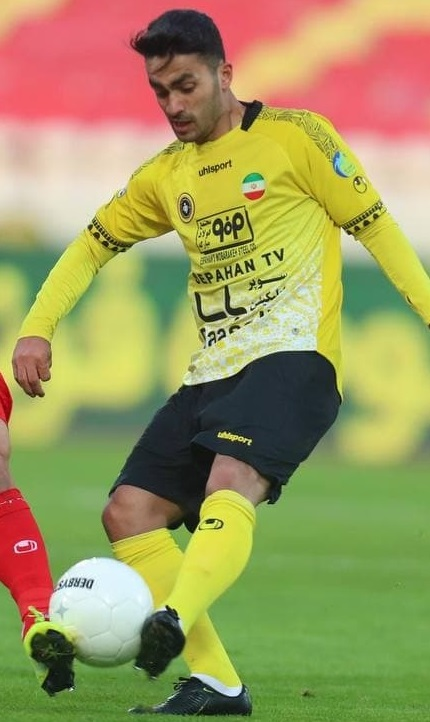

Personal information
- Full name: Seyed Mohammad Karimi
- Date of birth: 20 June 1996 (age 30)
- Place of birth: Sari, Iran
- Height: 1.77 m (5 ft 10 in)
- Position: Midfielder

Team information
- Current team: Sepahan
- Number: 8

Youth career
- 2014–2017: Khooneh be Khooneh

Senior career*
Years	Team	Apps	(Gls)
2017–2018	Khooneh be Khooneh	6	(0)
2018–	Sepahan	164	(9)

International career^{‡}
2015–2016	Iran U20	6	(0)
2023–	Iran	10	(0)
Medal record
Representing Iran
CAFA Nations Cup
Winner	2023 Kyrgyzstan – Uzbekistan	Team
- * Club domestic league appearances and goals as of 15 May 2025 ‡ National team caps and goals as of 5 June 2025

Seyed Mohammad Karimi (Persian: سید محمد کریمی; born 20 June 1996) is an Iranian footballer who plays as a central midfielder for Sepahan in the Persian Gulf Pro League.

He made his Iran Pro League debut on 3 August 2018 against Sepidrood Rasht.

== Career statistics ==
=== Club ===
As of match played 15 May 2025

Appearances and goals by club, season and competition
Club	Season	League			Cup		Continental		Total	
Club	Season	Division	Apps	Goals	Apps	Goals	Apps	Goals	Apps	Goals
Iran			League		Hazfi Cup		Asia		Total	
Rayka	2017–18	Azadegan League	6	0	2	0	—		8	0
Sepahan	2018–19	Iran Pro League	23	0	3	0	—		26	0
Sepahan	2019–20	Iran Pro League	15	2	1	0	4	0	20	2
Sepahan	2020–21	Iran Pro League	27	0	3	0	—		30	0
Sepahan	2021–22	Iran Pro League	27	1	2	0	5	0	34	1
Sepahan	2022–23	Iran Pro League	23	1	1	0	—		24	1
Sepahan	2023–24	Iran Pro League	23	0	4	0	6	0	33	0
Sepahan	2024–25	Iran Pro League	26	5	3	0	7	1	36	6
Sepahan	Total		164	9	17	0	22	1	203	10
Career total			170	9	19	0	22	1	211	10

=== International ===
As of match played 5 June 2025

Appearances and goals by national team and year
National team	Year	Apps	Goals
Iran	2023	3	0
Iran	2024	4	0
Iran	2025	3	0
Total		10	0

== Honours ==
=== Club ===
Sepahan

- Iranian Hazfi Cup: 2023–24
- Iranian Super Cup: 2024

=== Individual ===
- Persian Gulf Pro League Most Assists: 2018–19
