= Hamed Bahiraei =

Iranian footballer (born 1995)

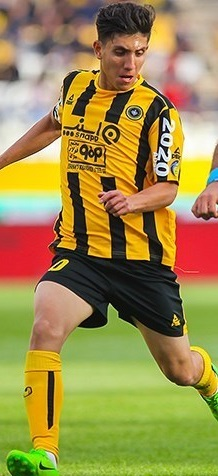

Personal information
- Date of birth: 12 July 1995 (age 31)
- Place of birth: Esfahan, Iran
- Height: 1.84 m (6 ft 0 in)
- Position: Defensive midfielder

Team information
- Current team: Aluminium Arak
- Number: 70

Youth career
- Sepahan

Senior career*
Years	Team	Apps	(Gls)
2010–2012	Sepahan C		
2012–2015	Sepahan B	37	(8)
2015–2021	Sepahan	29	(0)
2020	→ Nassaji (loan)	0	(0)
2021–2022	Qashqai	21	(1)
2022–2024	Fajr Sepasi	45	(2)
2024–2025	Esteghlal Khuzestan	15	(1)
2025–2026	Shams Azar	19	(0)
2026–	Aluminium Arak	5	(0)

International career
2012–2015	Iran U20	5	(0)
- * Club domestic league appearances and goals as of 30 October 2024

Hamed Bahiraei (Persian: حامد بحیرایی; born 12 July 1995) is a footballer who played as a defensive midfielder for Aluminium Arak.

== Club career statistics ==
- Last Update:17 May 2016

Club performance			League		Cup		Continental		Total	
Season	Club	League	Apps	Goals	Apps	Goals	Apps	Goals	Apps	Goals
Iran			League		Hazfi Cup		Asia		Total	
2015–16	Sepahan	Iran Pro League	2	0	0	0	0	0	2	0
2016–17	Sepahan	Iran Pro League	0	0	0	0	-	-	0	0
2017–18	Sepahan	Iran Pro League	1	0	0	0	-	-	1	0
2018–19	Sepahan	Iran Pro League	12	0	1	0	-	-	13	0
2019–20	Sepahan	Iran Pro League	0	0	0	0	0	0	0	0
Career total			15	0	1	0	0	0	16	0
