= Ezzatollah Pourghaz =

Iranian footballer

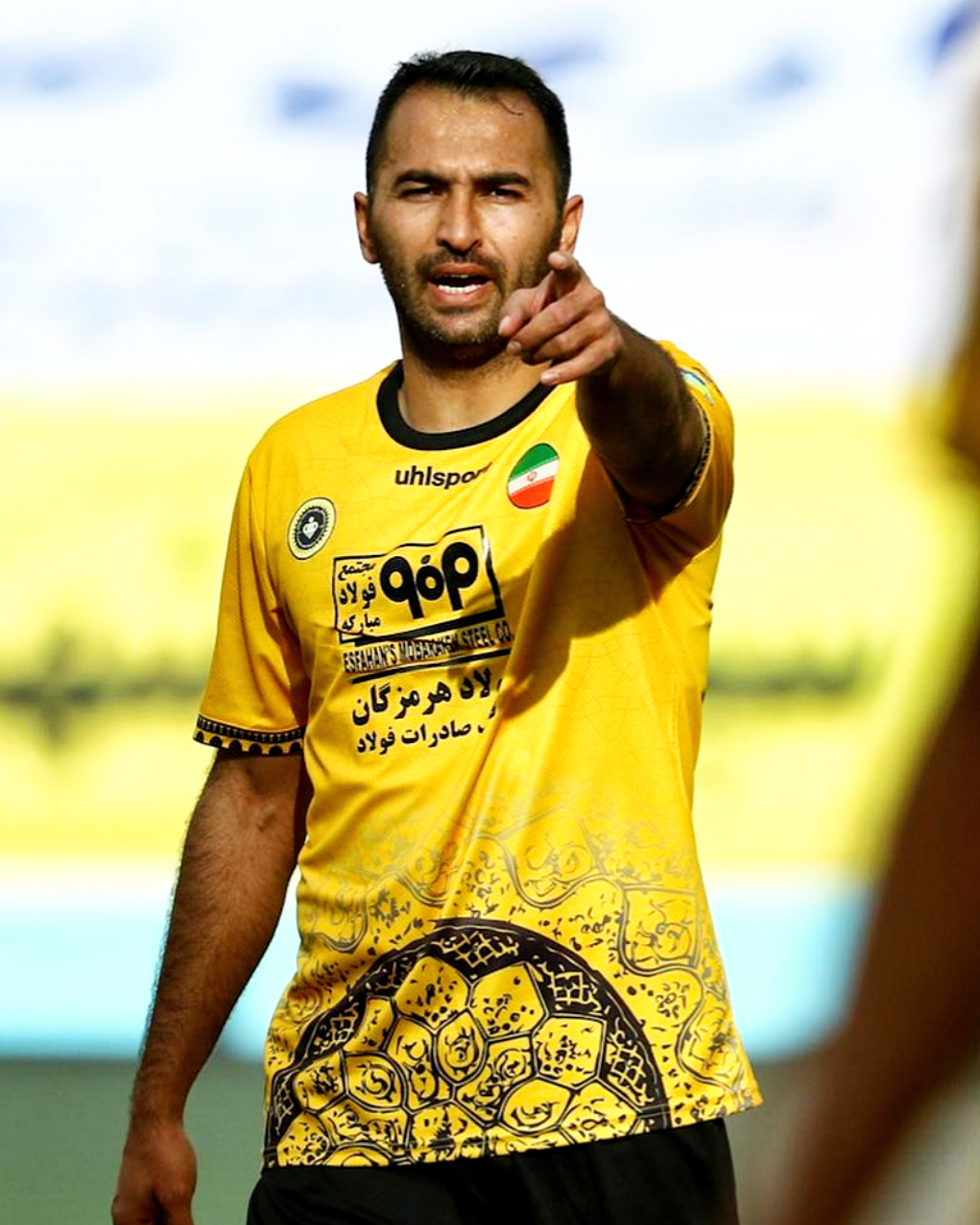
- Pourghaz with Sepahan in 2022

Personal information
- Full name: Ezzatollah Pourghaz
- Date of birth: 21 March 1987 (age 39)
- Place of birth: Bandar Torkaman, Iran
- Height: 1.81 m (5 ft 11 in)
- Positions: Center back; defensive midfielder

Team information
- Current team: Havadar
- Number: 5

Senior career*
Years	Team	Apps	(Gls)
2011–2013	Etka	24	(0)
2013–2014	Iranjavan	21	(0)
2014–2016	Malavan	46	(2)
2016–2017	Esteghlal Khuzestan	12	(1)
2017	Saipa	13	(1)
2017–2022	Sepahan	88	(8)
2022–2023	Havadar	28	(4)

International career^{‡}
2015–2017	Iran	8	(0)
- * Club domestic league appearances and goals as of 18 May 2023 ‡ National team caps and goals as of 5 September 2017

Ezzatollah Pourghaz (Persian: عزت‌الله پورقاز; born 21 March 1987 in Bandar Torkaman, Iran) is an Iranian footballer who played for Havadar in the Persian Gulf Pro League and the Iran national football team.

== Personal life ==
Pourghaz is of Iranian Turkmen origin.

== Club career ==
=== Iranjavan ===
On 25 September 2013 Ezzatollah made his debut against Naft Gachsaran which turned 2–2. He was one of a key players, played 21 matches and was one of the best defenders in the team. In his team he got the least cards, as he only got 2 yellow cards.

=== Malavan ===
He signed his contract with Malavan on 2014. He made his Malavan debut and Persian Gulf Pro League debut in a match against one of the big teams in Iran: Sepahan, the game turned 1–1.

=== Senior team ===
Pourghaz made his debut on 12 November 2015 against Turkmenistan in the 2018 World Cup qualifications. On 17 November 2015 he had to play the last 20 minutes of Iran's match against Guam as a goalkeeper as teammate Alireza Beiranvand was sent off and Iran were out of substitutes, the match finished as a 6–0 victory for Iran.
