= Karim Ghanbari =

Iranian football manager (born 1967)

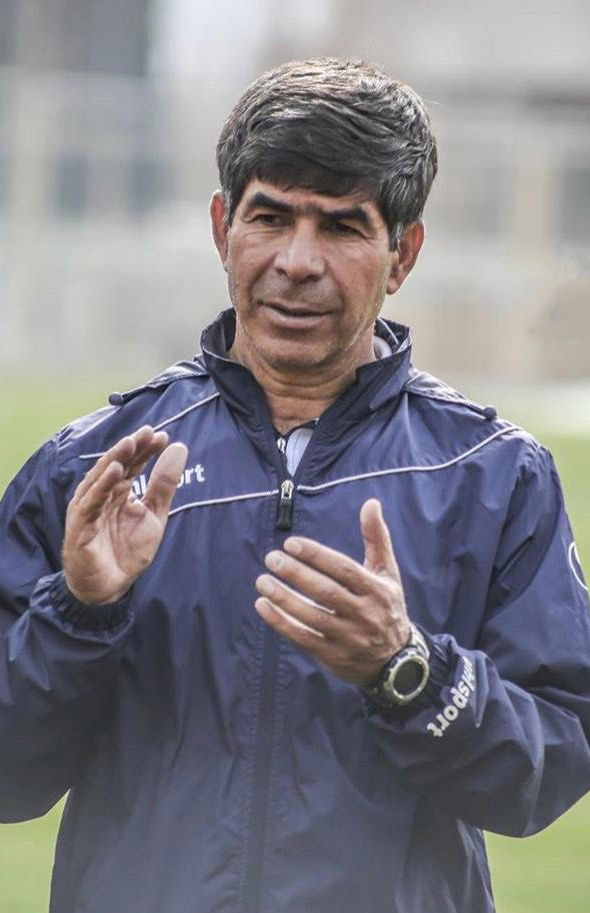

Personal information
- Full name: Karim Ghanbari
- Date of birth: 3 February 1967 (age 59)
- Place of birth: Dezful, Iran
- Position: Midfielder

Senior career*
Years	Team	Apps	(Gls)
1990–2002	Sepahan		
2002–2004	Foolad		

Managerial career
- 2005–2008: Sepahan (assistant)
- 2008: Sepahan (caretaker)
- 2008–2009: Al-Nasr (assistant)
- 2009–2011: Sepahan (assistant)
- 2011: Sepahan (caretaker)
- 2012–2013: Naft Tehran (assistant)
- 2013–2014: Rah Ahan (assistant)
- 2014–2015: Paykan (assistant)
- 2016–2018: Sepahan (assistant)
- 2018: Sepahan (caretaker)
- 2018–2019: Esteghlal Khuzestan (assistant)
- 2019: Esteghlal Khuzestan (caretaker)
- * Club domestic league appearances and goals

Karim Ghanbari (born 3 February 1967, in Dezful) is an Iranian football manager. He came to Sepahan as assistant to Luka Bonačić in 2006, and was the caretaker head coach of Sepahan from 14 October 2011 to 1 November 2011. He was also Bonačić's assistant coach in Al-Nasr from 2008 to 2009.

== Early life ==
He was born on 3 February 1967 in Dezful, Khuzestan province. His family was moved to Isfahan in 1972. He began playing football in sepahan Youth team in 1985.

== Playing career ==
He was joined to poli akril First team squad in 1987 and was played for it until 1990. In 1990, he signed a contract with another Isfahan based team, Sepahan. He was played for Sepahan until 2002 and was one of the Sepahan's best players. and was retired from playing football in 2004.

== Coaching career ==
He was selected as Sepahan's assistant coach in 2006 by Luka Bonačić. After Sepahan was unable to win the 2007–08 season and was ranked as runner up like AFC Champions League and winning Hazfi Cup in both 2006 and 2007, Bonačić was resigned as Sepahan's head coach and was appointed as Dubai based team, Al-Nasr Sports Club. He was selected Ghanbari as his first team assistant coach which was worked with him until his dismissal in February 2009. After he expired his contract with Al-Nasr, he became assistant manager of Sepahan for a second time under management of Amir Ghalenoei. He continue his career with Sepahan after Ghalenoie's resignation in 2011. Bonačić was appointed as Sepahan head coach for a second tenure and Ghanbari was one of his assistants. On 14 August 2011 and after Bonačić was sacked by club due to bad results, Ghanbari became caretaker manager of Sepahan. He was replaced with Zlatko Kranjčar after Sepahan was eliminated from Hazfi Cup. On 30 May 2012, he was named as Mansour Ebrahimzadeh's assistant coach in Naft Tehran. After Ebrahimzadeh signed as head coach of Rah Ahan, Ghanbari also signs a contract to become his assistant.

== Statistics ==
As of 26 January 2018

Team	From	To	Record						
Team	From	To	G	W	D	L	GF	GA	+/-
Sepahan (caretaker)	January 2008	February 2008	2	1	0	1	4	3	+1
Sepahan (caretaker)	October 2011	November 2011	4	2	1	1	6	5	+1
Sepahan (caretaker)	January 2018	January 2018	1	0	0	1	0	1	-1
Esteghlal Khuzestan (caretaker)	February 2019	April 2019	4	1	0	3	3	6	-3
Total			11	4	1	6	13	15	-2
