= Sasan Ansari =

Iranian footballer

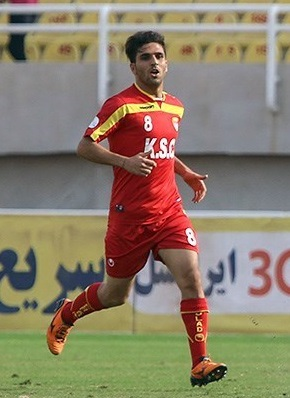
- Ansari playing for Foolad in 2016

Personal information
- Date of birth: 4 May 1991 (age 35)
- Place of birth: Nurabad, Iran
- Height: 1.73 m (5 ft 8 in)
- Positions: Forward; winger

Team information
- Current team: Foolad
- Number: 3

Youth career
- 2008–2012: Foolad

Senior career*
Years	Team	Apps	(Gls)
2012–2016	Foolad	105	(14)
2016	Persepolis	2	(0)
2016–2017	Foolad	25	(16)
2017–2019	Sepahan	44	(15)
2019–2020	Tractor	43	(6)
2020–	Foolad	175	(16)
- * Club domestic league appearances and goals as of 23 May 2019

Sasan Ansari (born 4 May 1991) is an Iranian professional footballer who plays for Foolad as a forward.

== Career ==
Ansari started his career with Foolad in his teenage years. Later, he was placed on the first team by Majid Jalali.

== Career statistics ==
As of 10 October 2026

Appearances and goals by club, season and competition
Club	Season	League			Hazfi Cup		Asia		Other		Total	
Club	Season	Division	Apps	Goals	Apps	Goals	Apps	Goals	Apps	Goals	Apps	Goals
Foolad	2010–11	Pro League	0	0	0	0	—		—		0	0
Foolad	2011–12	Pro League	16	2	2	0	—		—		18	2
Foolad	2012–13	Pro League	19	0	1	0	—		—		20	0
Foolad	2013–14	Pro League	12	0	1	0	8	0	0	0	21	0
Foolad	2014–15	Pro League	28	3	1	0	6	0	0	0	35	3
Foolad	2015–16	Pro League	28	9	3	0	—		—		31	9
Foolad	Total		103	14	8	2	14	0	0	0	111	16
Persepolis	2016–17	Pro League	2	0	0	0	—		—		2	0
Foolad	2016–17	Pro League	25	16	3	2	—		—		28	18
Sepahan	2017–18	Pro League	29	11	1	0	—		—		30	11
Sepahan	2018–19	Pro League	15	3	3	0	—		—		18	3
Sepahan	Total		44	14	4	0	0	0	0	0	48	14
Tractor	2018–19	Pro League	13	1	0	0	—		—		14	1
Tractor	2019–20	Pro League	30	5	3	0	—		—		33	5
Tractor	Total		43	6	3	0	0	0	0	0	46	6
Foolad	2020–21	Persian Gulf Pro League	28	3	4	0	6	0	0	0	38	3
Foolad	2021-22	Persian Gulf Pro League	28	0	1	0	8	1	1	0	38	1
Foolad	2022-23	Persian Gulf Pro League	29	3	2	1	0	0	0	0	31	4
Foolad	2023-24	Persian Gulf Pro League	29	5	1	0	0	0	0	0	30	5
Foolad	2024-25	Persian Gulf Pro League	29	4	2	0	0	0	0	0	31	4
Foolad	2025-26	Persian Gulf Pro League	20	0	1	3	0	0	0	0	21	3
Foolad	2026-27	Persian Gulf Pro League	8	1	0	0	0	0	0	0	8	1
Foolad	Total		151	16	11	4	14	1	1	0	176	18
Career total			380	65	29	7	14	1	1	0	432	75

== Honours ==
Foolad

- Persian Gulf Pro League: 2013–14
- Hazfi Cup: 2020–21
- Iranian Super Cup: 2021

Tractor

- Hazfi Cup: 2019–20

Individual

- Persian Gulf Pro League Team of the Season : 2016-17
