= Jalaleddin Alimohammadi =

Iranian football striker

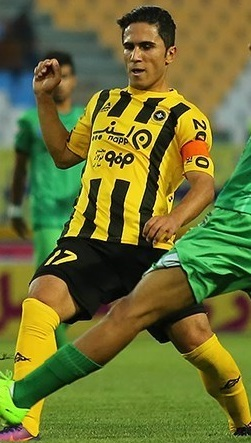

Personal information
- Full name: Jalaleldin Alimohammadi
- Date of birth: June 15, 1990 (age 36)
- Place of birth: Rudsar, Gilan, Iran
- Height: 1.73 m (5 ft 8 in)
- Positions: Attacking midfielder; winger

Team information
- Current team: Zob Ahan
- Number: 17

Youth career
- 2002–2007: Sepahan

Senior career*
Years	Team	Apps	(Gls)
2007–2008	Sepahan	5	(0)
2008–2010	Sepahan Novin		
2010–2011	Foolad Natanz		
2011–2012	Gostaresh Foolad		
2012–2014	Fajr Sepasi	34	(4)
2014–2016	Saba Qom	43	(9)
2016–2019	Sepahan	62	(13)
2019–2020	Paykan	27	(3)
2020–2023	Sepahan	57	(0)
2023–2025	Mes Rafsanjan	53	(9)
2025	Kheybar Khorramabad	0	(0)
2025–	Zob Ahan	32	(0)

International career^{‡}
2006	Iran U17	6	(2)
2007	Iran U20	3	(1)
- * Club domestic league appearances and goals as of 19 March 2021 ‡ National team caps and goals as of 8 September 2008

Jalaleddin Alimohammadi (Persian: جلال‌الدین علی‌محمدی, born June 15, 1990) is an Iranian football attacking midfielder who played for Zob Ahan in the Persian Gulf Pro League.
