= Mehrdad Mohammadi =

Iranian football Winger (born 1993)

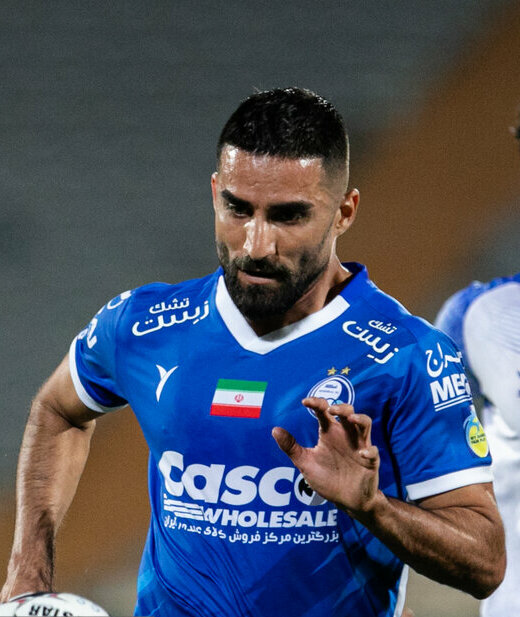
- Mehrdad playing for Esteghlal against Malavan

Personal information
- Full name: Mehrdad Mohammadi Keshmarzi
- Date of birth: 29 September 1993 (age 33)
- Place of birth: Tehran, Iran
- Height: 1.78 m (5 ft 10 in)
- Position: Winger

Team information
- Current team: Foolad
- Number: 7

Youth career
- 2007–2008: Persepolis
- 2008–2011: Steel Azin
- 2011–2012: Damash Tehran
- 2012–2014: Oghab Tehran

Senior career*
Years	Team	Apps	(Gls)
2014–2016	Rah Ahan	41	(11)
2016–2019	Sepahan	83	(14)
2019–2020	Aves	28	(8)
2020–2022	Al-Arabi	25	(11)
2022–2023	Al Sailiya	17	(9)
2023–2025	Esteghlal	29	(9)
2025–2026	Tractor	2	(0)
2026–	Foolad	8	(0)

International career^{‡}
2015–2016	Iran U23	7	(3)
2019–	Iran	5	(2)
- * Club domestic league appearances and goals as of 18 October 2024 ‡ National team caps and goals as of 21 November 2023

Mehrdad Mohammadi (Persian: مهرداد محمدی; born 29 September 1993) is an Iranian football winger who plays for Iranian football club Foolad in the Persian Gulf Pro League. His twin brother Milad plays for Persepolis.

== Club career ==
=== Rah Ahan ===
Mohammadi signed his first professional contract with Rah Ahan in the summer of 2014 after spending the past two years with Oghab Tehran U21. He rejected an offer from Esteghlal in January 2016 after revealing he is a supporter of rival team Persepolis

=== Sepahan ===
Mohammadi joined Sepahan on 14 June 2016 with signing a five-year contract. He has also offers from Persepolis and Paykan.

=== Desportivo Aves ===
Mohammadi joined Desportivo Aves in May 2019.

On 21 July 2020, he terminated his contract after the club failed to pay him for 3 months.

== International career ==
He made his senior team debut against Cambodia in a 2022 FIFA World Cup qualifying match on 10 October 2019.

== Personal life ==
Mohammadi was born south of Tehran in the Fallah district; however, he claims to be a native of Qazvin. His family originates from Qazvin Province, and they are of Persian and Iranian Azerbaijani descent. He hails from the village of Kashmarz.

Mehrdad is the twin brother of professional footballer Milad Mohammadi.

== Career statistics ==
=== Club ===
As of 24 May 2025

Appearances and goals by club, season and competition
Club	Season	League			National Cup		League Cup		Continental		Total	
Club	Season	Division	Apps	Goals	Apps	Goals	Apps	Goals	Apps	Goals	Apps	Goals
Rah Ahan	2014–15	Persian Gulf Pro League	13	1	0	0	—		—		13	1
Rah Ahan	2015–16	Persian Gulf Pro League	28	10	2	1	—		—		30	11
Rah Ahan	Total		41	11	2	1	—		—		43	12
Sepahan	2016–17	Persian Gulf Pro League	28	7	4	0	—		—		32	7
Sepahan	2017–18	Persian Gulf Pro League	26	1	1	0	—		—		27	1
Sepahan	2018–19	Persian Gulf Pro League	29	6	4	1	—		—		33	7
Sepahan	Total		83	14	9	1	—		—		92	15
Aves	2019–20	Primeira Liga	28	8	1	0	0	0	—		29	8
Al-Arabi	2019–20	Qatar Stars League	0	0	1	0	1	0	0	0	2	0
Al-Arabi	2020–21	Qatar Stars League	20	10	3	2	2 (Note: Two appearances and two goals in Qatari Stars Cup, four appearances and two goals in Qatar Cup)	2	—		25	14
Al-Arabi	2021–22	Qatar Stars League	5	1	1	2	0	0	—		6	3
Al-Arabi	Total		25	11	5	4	3	2	—		32	17
Al-Sailiya SC	2022–23	Qatar Stars League	17	9	5	1	3	2	—		25	12
Esteghlal	2023–24	Persian Gulf Pro League	27	8	1	0	—		—		28	8
Esteghlal	2024–25	Persian Gulf Pro League	2	1	1	0	3	0	—		6	1
Esteghlal	Total		29	9	2	0	3	0	—		34	9
Career total			223	60	24	7	9	4	—		256	71

=== International ===
As of match played 21 November 2023

Appearances and goals by national team and year
National team	Year	Apps	Goals
Iran
Iran	2019	2	1
Iran	2023	3	1
Total		5	2

Scores and results list Iran's goal tally first.

No.	Date	Venue	Opponent	Score	Result	Competition
1.	10 October 2019	Azadi Stadium, Tehran, Iran	Cambodia	13–0	14–0	2022 FIFA World Cup qualification
2.	13 October 2023	Amman International Stadium, Amman, Jordan	Jordan	3–1	3–1	2023 Jordan International Tournament

== Honours ==
Al-Arabi SC

Qatar FA Cup: 2022

Esteghlal

Iranian Hazfi Cup: 2024–25

Tractor

- Iranian Super Cup: 2025
