= Sepahan S.C. =

Iranian association football club based in Isfahan

- Full name: Foolad Mobarakeh Sepahan Sport Club
- Nicknames: Yellow Storm of Asia; Yellow Lions of Isfahan
- Short name: Sepahan
- Founded: 5 October 1953; 73 years ago
- Ground: Naghsh-e Jahan Stadium
- Capacity: 76,000
- Owner: Mobarakeh Steel Company
- President: Manouchehr Nikfar
- Manager: Moharram Navidkia
- League: Persian Gulf Pro League
- 2025–26: Persian Gulf Pro League, 3rd
- Website: www.sepahansc.com
Home colours	Away colours	Third colours

Foolad Mobarakeh Sepahan Sport Club (Persian: باشگاه فولاد مبارکه سپاهان, Bâšgâh-e Farhangi-Varzeši-ye Fulâd-e Mobârake-ye Sepâhân), commonly known as Sepahan, is an Iranian sports club based in Isfahan. It is best known for their football section that play in the Persian Gulf Pro League, the highest tier of Iranian football league system.

In the 2002–03 season, Sepahan ended the total dominance of two Tehran-based clubs, Persepolis and Esteghlal, to win the Pro League. They are also the first Iranian club to win three consecutive league titles, reach the AFC Champions League final in 2007 and qualify for the 2007 FIFA Club World Cup, becoming the first-ever Iranian representative to the tournament. To date, they have won five league titles and five Hazfi Cups, becoming one of the most successful football clubs in Iran.

== Club history ==
=== Before the revolution ===
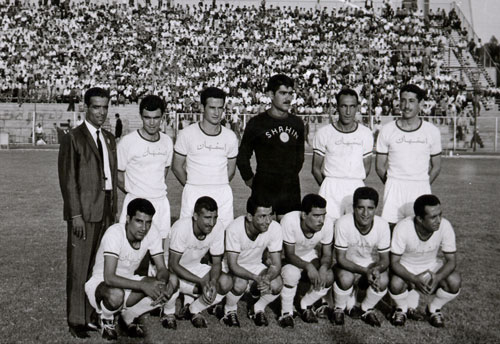
Shahin Isfahan Club

In 1953, with the help of Iran national football team player Mahmoud Hariri the Shahin Isfahan football club was created. This club was one of the teams attached to the more popular and successful Shahin F.C. of Tehran. In 1963, Shahin as the representative of Isfahan Province became champions of Iran after a 1–1 draw against Tehran XI. In 1967, due to the problems that arose in the Shahin F.C. organization in Tehran, the Isfahan branch was forced to cease operations. The club changed its name to Sepahan. The club participated in the Takht Jamshid Cup league from 1974 to 1978. In the club's first season in the Takht Jamshid Cup they finished in 10th place ahead of city rivals Zob Ahan.

=== Post Revolution ===
After the Revolution, they played in the local Isfahan leagues for many years until 1993. That year the club was purchased by the Siman-e-Sepahan (Sepahan Cement) factory of Isfahan. It participated in the Azadegan League until the year 2000, when Foolad Mobarekeh (Steel Mill of Mobarekeh Isfahan) bought the team from the Siman factory. The team now plays under the name of Foolad Mobarakeh Sepahan, and has support from the club board.

=== Success years ===
The club was able to demonstrate its worth when it captured the league title in the 2002–03 season of the IPL, and qualified for the AFC Champions League tournament with Farhad Kazemi. It also won the Hazfi Cup in 2004 and was able to qualify for another season of the ACL competition, though the club did not have much success in the continental tournaments of ACL 2004 and 2005.

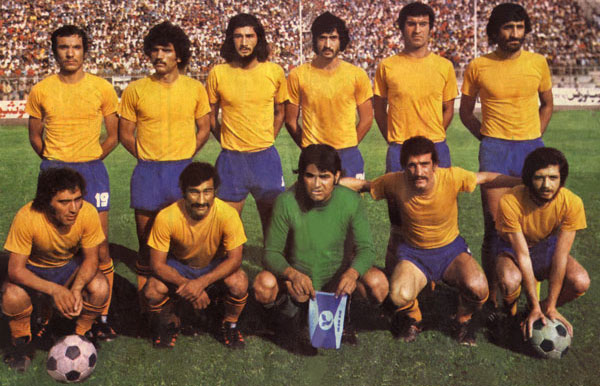
Sepahan in a match against Homa during 1975–76 season

With Luka Bonačić, Sepahan was able to once again win the Hazfi Cup on 22 September 2006. With this win, they gained Iran's final and second spot in the AFC Champions League 2007. They were impressive in continental stage as they finished top of their group and defeated Kawasaki Frontale of Japan and Al Wahda of the UAE to reach the final of the newly established continental tournament for the first time. Although they lost the final to Urawa Red Diamonds on aggregate, by reaching the final, Sepahan became the first Iranian club to qualify for the FIFA Club World Cup.

In the opening match of the FIFA Club World Cup 2007, Sepahan defeated Waitakere United of New Zealand to reach the quarter-final where they met Urawa Red Diamonds for a spot in the semifinal match against AC Milan. Urawa Reds managed to defeat Sepahan for the second time in just one month, reaching the semifinals of the FIFA Club World Cup.

By winning the Hazfi Cup once again in 2007, Sepahan also qualified for the AFC Champions League 2008, but could not repeat their success of 2007.

Sepahan has qualified for the AFC Champions League for the third consecutive time in 2009, coming as the Runners-up in Persian Gulf Cup 2007-08. Sepahan lost the title by only one point to Persepolis F.C., who beat them 2–1 in the last match of the season with a winner six minutes into second half injury time. They tried to improve the team by sacking the Brazilian coach Viera and replacing him with the German coach Firat but they had a difficult season where they could not win anything in the 2008–09 season and changed the coach three times.

In the next season Sepahan hired Turkish and former Iran's assistant coach Engin Firat, but he was fired after getting poor result in the league, and Hossein Charkhabi who was Sepahan Novin head coach at that time replaced Firat. Despite getting good result with the team Charkahbi was replaced once again with Farhad Kazemi who won the league title with Sepahan in the 2002–03 season. Finally Sepahan finished 4th in the league and qualified for the 2010 AFC Champions League Group stage. In the next season the club hired former Iran and Esteghlal head coach Amir Ghalenoei, at the helm of Sepahan's 2010 Season, the club sealed a championship title two weeks before the end of the season with a 2–2 tie against F.C. Aboomoslem.

In the 2010–11 Persian Gulf Cup, Sepahan dominated the league after a slow start and practically won the title two weeks before the season end. They also advanced to the knock out stage of the ACL competition, after finishing on top of the table in the group stage. Their group was arguably the group of death, consisting of Al-Hilal, Al Gharafa and Al-Jazira. They won their third championship and became the most successful team in Iran Pro League.

==== Kranjčar Era ====
They also repeated their league title in 2011–12 season, this time with Croatian manager, Zlatko Kranjčar. Sepahan also made it to the quarter-finals of 2012 AFC Champions League after defeating the fellow Iranian club Esteghlal.

In 2013 however, Sepahan was placed in Group C of the 2013 AFC Champions League and was unable to get past the 2013 AFC Champions League group stage. Being placed in the same group as Al-Gharafa Sports Club of Qatar, Al-Ahli SC of Saudi Arabia and United Arab Emirates' Al Nasr SC, they could not qualify as one of the top two teams of their group. Sepahan started the 2013 AFC Champions League with a great win at home against Al Nasr SC, however heading for an away game against Al-Gharafa Sports Club in Qatar, Sepahan only returned home humiliated by the Qatari team in a 3–1 lost game. That was not the end of Sepahan's poor performance in the AFC Champions League. About three weeks after their loss in Qatar, Sepahan hosted Al-Ahli SC at Foolad Shahr Stadium, losing poorly once again but this time with a score of 4–2. Sepahan still had a chance after those two losses, but all hopes were lost once they lost in front of the Saudi giants again, this time with a score of 4–1 thus having them bid farewell to the 2013 AFC Champions League.

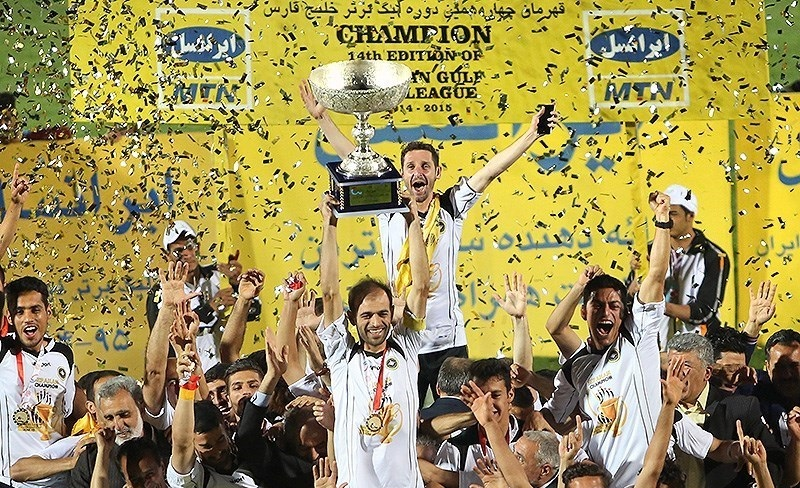
Sepahan players celebrating their fifth league title in 2015

In the 2013–14 Iran Pro League season, Sepahan finished 4th, thus missing out on the AFC Champions League for the first time in five years. At the end of the season, Croatian manager Zlatko Kranjčar announced that he would not be returning for the 2014–2015 season. Sepahan also struggled in the Champions League as well, failing to make it past the group stage with a 1–0 loss to Al Hilal on the final match day. After originally announcing he was leaving the club, Sepahan announced that they had extended the contract of Kranjčar for another season.

==== Faraki years ====
Sepahan started the 2014–15 season with three wins in a row. However, Sepahan did not win their next four matches. Kranjčar resigned on 8 September 2014 and was replaced with former Foolad manager Hossein Faraki.

On 15 May 2015, with a 2–0 Sepahan victory over Saipa and Tractor drawing 3–3 with Naft Tehran, Sepahan won their fifth league title with a one-point margin over runner up Tractor. With the league victory, Sepahan returned to the AFC Champions League after a one-year absence.

On 12 November 2015 Hossein Faraki left Sepahan for personal problems. Faraki left by saying "Things just don't seem to be working out for me and I decided to quit my job in the team, I have nothing more to say because I think Sepahan needs concentration at the moment since they will play in Iran's Hazfi Cup on Thursday."

=== Štimac and Veisi years ===
After Hossein Faraki's resignation, the club signed former Croatia national team manager Igor Štimac. Igor Štimac won his first game against Naft Tehran, but after not winning a game in 10 weeks made the situations harder for Sepahan. Sepahan got knocked out of the Hazfi Cup by their rivals, Zob Ahan in penalties at the semi-final. Sepahan also went out of the AFC Champions League after losing five times in the first round. Igor Štimac resigned as Sepahan head coach on 20 April 2016, after a run of unsuccessful results which led the league champions Sepahan to end up in 11th place and out of both season's cups, Hazfi Cup and AFC Champions League.

Before the start of the 2016–17 season, Abdollah Veisi who had led Esteghlal Khuzestan to the league title, was announced as the new manager of Sepahan but sepahans poor results continued so they announced Zlatko Kranjčar as their new manager. Sepahan finished the season in the 5th place.

== Reserve team ==

Sepahan is also one of the clubs in Iranian football to have a senior reserve team, Foolad Sepahan Novin F.C., that as of the 2007/08 season, participates in 3rd Division and the Hazfi Cup. The reserve team was promoted to the Iran Pro League from the Azadegan League, but was not allowed to participate due to Fifa's regulations about two teams from the same club playing in the same league.

== Crest and colours ==
The team's primary color is yellow, but it has undergone changes throughout history. Sepahan has also used blue or red at times during the league.

Sepahan's emblem, logo, or logotype has undergone changes throughout the club's history. The club's first emblem, when it was called Shahin Isfahan, was similar to the emblem of Shahin Tehran.

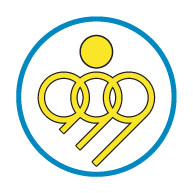
Sepahan's Logo (2000-2006)

Current club logo Since 2006 (Folad Mobarakeh Sepahan)

== Rivalries ==
=== Isfahan Derby ===
The Nagsh-e Jahan derby is a football match played annually in Isfahan, Iran, between the two rival professional teams of the city: Zob Ahan F.C. and Sepahan. Naqsh-e Jahan is an important square in old centrum of Isfahan. The competition is one of the most popular annual football events in Iran. The Isfahan derby goes back to the 1970s, when Zob Ahan F.C. and Sepahan F.C. faced each other in Takht Jamshid Cup seasons (1974/75, 1975/76, 1976/77, 1977/78). Their rivalry resumed in the 1990s when they faced each other in Azadegan League seasons (1993/94, 1996/97, 1997/98) and from then on the two met each other twice a year.

=== Tehran rivalries ===
Esteghlal–Sepahan and Persepolis–Sepahan rivalries are the two important Iran Football Rivalries played between Sepahan and two Tehran based football clubs: Esteghlal and Persepolis.

== FIFA Club World Cup ==
Sepahan S.C., an Iranian football club, made its debut in the FIFA Club World Cup in 2007, when it took part in the competition along with other champion teams like AC Milan, Boca Juniors, Pachuca, Waitakere United, Étoile du Sahel, and Urawa Red Diamonds. It is the sole representative of Iran in the competition till date.

== Partnerships ==
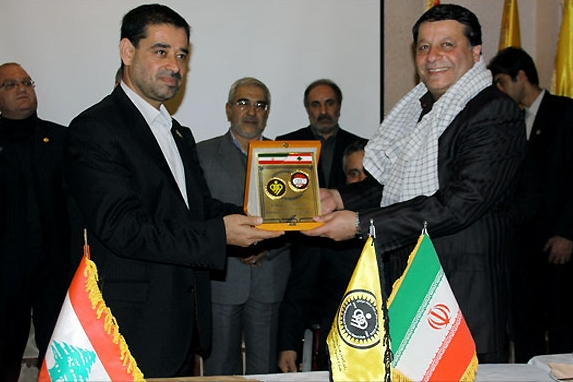
The general secretary of Ahed (left) and the president of Sepahan (right) in 2009

On 28 January 2009, Sepahan and Lebanese club Ahed signed an informal partnership deal. The partnership was made official on 8 March 2021, involving training camps and friendly games between the two sides.

== Stadium ==
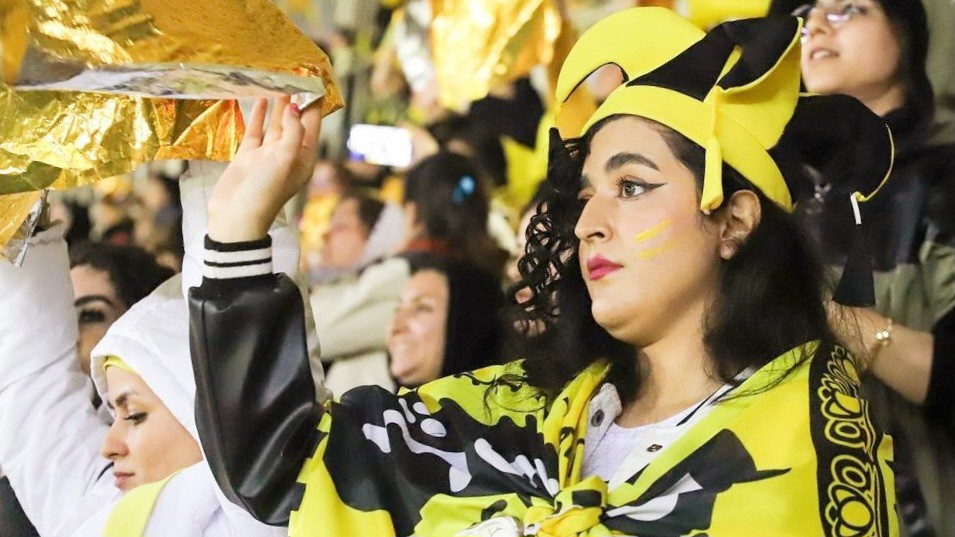
Sepahan female fans entered the stadiums for the first time after 1979 ban in 2024.

The Naghsh-e-Jahan Stadium is a multi-purpose stadium in Isfahan, Iran that is home ground of Sepahan. It is currently used for football matches. The stadium was built in 2003 and holds 45,000 in a three-tier configuration. The first phase finished in 2003 and they have decided to finish the second phase which is the first floor of the stadium. It was started in 2007 and was meant to be finished by 2008, but construction continued until summer 2016. The final capacity of the stadium will be 76,000. Sepahan's second home ground is Foolad Shahr Stadium that is the home ground of Zob Ahan too. Some of Sepahan's matches are held in that stadium.

In 2024, female supporters of the club watched the team's match in stadium for the first time after the 1979 ban.

== Season-by-season ==
For details on seasons, see List of Sepahan F.C. seasons

Season	Div.	Pos.	Hazfi Cup	Asia	
2001–02	IPL	9th	Semi-Final	-	-
2002–03	IPL	Champions	Semi-Final	-	-
2003–04	IPL	6th	Champions	ACL	Group stage
2004–05	IPL	10th	1/8 Final	ACL	Group stage
2005–06	IPL	7th	Champions	-	-
2006–07	IPL	5th	Champions	ACL	Runner Up
2007–08	IPL	2nd	Quarter-Final	ACL	Group stage
2008–09	IPL	4th	1/8 Final	ACL	Group stage
2009–10	IPL	Champions	1/8 Final	ACL	Group stage
2010–11	IPL	Champions	Quarter-Final	ACL	Quarter-Final
2011–12	IPL	Champions	Round of 32	ACL	Quarter-Final
2012–13	IPL	3rd	Champions	ACL	Group stage
2013–14	IPL	4th	Round of 32	ACL	Group stage
2014–15	IPL	Champions	Round of 32	-	-
2015–16	IPL	11th	Semi-Final	ACL	Group stage
2016–17	IPL	5th	Semi-Final	-	-
2017–18	IPL	14th	Round of 32	-	-
2018–19	IPL	2nd	Semi-Final	-	-
2019–20	IPL	5th	Quarter-Final	ACL	Group stage
2020–21	IPL	2nd	Quarter-Final	-	-
2021–22	IPL	3rd	Round of 16	ACL	Group Stage
2022–23	IPL	2nd	Round of 16	ACL	Round of 16
2023–24	IPL	3rd	Champions	-	-
2024–25	IPL	2nd	Quarter-finals	ACLE; ACL2	Group stage
2025–26	IPL				

== Honours ==
=== Domestic ===
==== League ====
- Persian Gulf Pro League
  - Winners (5): 2002–03, 2009–10, 2010–11, 2011–12, 2014–15
  - Runners-up (5): 2007–08, 2018–19, 2020–21, 2022–23, 2024–25
- 2nd Division
  - Winner (1): 1973–74

==== Cup ====
- Hazfi Cup
  - Winners (5): 2003–04, 2005–06, 2006–07, 2012–13, 2023–24
- Iranian Super Cup
  - Winners (1): 2024

=== Continental ===
- AFC Champions League Elite
  - Runners-up (1): 2007

== Players ==
=== First-team squad ===
As of 17 August 2026

Note: Flags indicate national team as defined under FIFA eligibility rules; some limited exceptions apply. Players may hold more than one non-FIFA nationality.

No.	Pos.	Nation	Player
1	GK	IRI	Hossein Hosseini
2	DF	IRI	Hadi Mohammadi
5	DF	IRI	Amin Hazbavi ^{U25}
6	MF	IRI	Aref Haji Eydi
7	FW	IRI	Mehdi Limouchi
8	MF	IRI	Mohammad Karimi (Vice Captain)
9	FW	IRI	Kaveh Rezaei (3rd Captain)
10	MF	POR	Ricardo Alves
11	FW	IRI	Reza Jafari
14	MF	IRI	Arya Yousefi ^{U25}
16	MF	IRI	Amir Hossein Jalalivand
17	MF	IRI	Mohammad Askari ^{U21}

No.	Pos.	Nation	Player
19	MF	IRI	Omid Noorafkan (4th Captain)
20	FW	IRI	Ali Khodadadi
22	GK	IRI	Mohammad Reza Nasri
23	MF	IRI	Gholamreza Sabet Imani
28	DF	IRI	Ehsan Hajsafi (Captain)
41	DF	IRI	Yasin Jorjani ^{U23}
44	DF	IRI	Armin Sohrabian
70	FW	IRI	Kasra Taheri ^{U21}
73	MF	IRI	Saeid Vasei
79	MF	IRI	Mohammad Mehdi Lotfi
81	MF	IRI	Abbas Habibi ^{U21}
88	MF	IRI	Arash Rezavand

=== Reserve Squad ===
Note: Flags indicate national team as defined under FIFA eligibility rules; some limited exceptions apply. Players may hold more than one non-FIFA nationality.

No.	Pos.	Nation	Player
12	GK	IRI	Amir Mehdi Maghsoudi ^{U19}
24	DF	IRI	Mohammad Reza Sharghi ^{U23}
31	MF	IRI	Raouf Soltani ^{U21}
33	DF	IRI	Amjad Kouchaki ^{U21}
72	DF	IRI	Pouya Rashedi ^{U21}
77	GK	IRI	Seyed Pouria Rafiei ^{U21}
80	MF	IRI	Abdolrahim Asgari ^{U19}

No.	Pos.	Nation	Player
83	MF	IRI	Amir Reza Jeddi ^{U21}
86	MF	IRI	Aria Shafiedoost ^{U19}
87	MF	IRI	Arash Hashemi ^{U23}
97	GK	IRI	Abolfazl Khalilian ^{U19}
98	MF	IRI	Taha Alemi ^{U21}
99	MF	IRI	Mahan Akbarzadeh ^{U19}

==== Loan list ====
Note: Flags indicate national team as defined under FIFA eligibility rules; some limited exceptions apply. Players may hold more than one non-FIFA nationality.

No.	Pos.	Nation	Player
—	MF	IRI	Ali Kamali (at Chadormalou until 30 June 2027)

=== Former players ===
For details on former players, see Category:Sepahan players.

=== Notable players ===
See: List of Sepahan players

== Managerial staff ==
=== Current managerial staff ===
Position	Name
Head coach	(Iran) Moharram Navidkia
Assistant coaches	(Iran) Hossein Ghadami (Iran) Vahid Esfahani
Goalkeepers coach	(Iran) Mohammadreza Farahani

=== Head coaches ===
Below is a list of Sepahan coaches from 1953 until the present day.

Name	Nationality	Years
Mahmoud Hariri	(Iran)	1953–1960
Technical Commission		1960–1970
Mahmoud Yavari	(Iran)	1970–1978
Zdravko Rajkov	(Socialist Federal Republic of Yugoslavia)	1978
Mahmoud Yavari	(Iran)	1978–1980
Masoud Tabesh	(Iran)	1980–1993
Firouz Karimi	(Iran)	1993–1994
Nasser Hejazi	(Iran)	1994–1995
Mahmoud Yavari	(Iran)	1995–1996
Rasoul Korbekandi	(Iran)	1996–1998
Mehdi Monajati	(Iran)	1998–1999
Hamid Nadimian	(Iran)	1999–2001
Stanko Poklepović	(Croatia)	2001–2002
Farhad Kazemi	(Iran)	2002–2005
Stanko Poklepović	(Croatia)	2005
Edson Tavares	(Brazil)	2005–2006
Luka Bonačić	(Croatia)	2006–2008
Jorvan Vieira	(Brazil)	2008
Engin Firat	(Turkey)	2008
Hossein Charkhabi	(Iran)	2008
Farhad Kazemi	(Iran)	2008–2009
Amir Ghalenoei	(Iran)	2009–2011
Luka Bonačić	(Croatia)	2011
Karim Ghanbari*	(Iran)	2011
Zlatko Kranjčar	(Croatia)	2011–2014
Hossein Faraki	(Iran)	2014–2015
Igor Štimac	(Croatia)	2015–2016
Ghasem Zaghinejad*	(Iran)	2016
Abdollah Veisi	(Iran)	2016–2017
Zlatko Kranjčar	(Croatia)	2017–2018
Mansour Ebrahimzadeh	(Iran)	2018
Amir Ghalenoei	(Iran)	2018–2020
Miguel Teixeira*	(Portugal)	2020
Moharram Navidkia	(Iran)	2020–2022
José Morais	(Portugal)	2022–2024
Hugo Almeida*	(Portugal)	2024
Jalal Omidian*	(Iran)	2024
Patrice Carteron	(France)	2024–2025
Moharram Navidkia	(Iran)	2025–present

== Club officials ==
Position	Name
President	Manouchehr Nikfar (Acting)
Chairman of the Board	Mojtaba Lotfi
Board Members	Mojtaba Lotfi; Mohammad Reza Saket; Karim Fakharezadeh; Ali Pezeshk; Alireza Afzal

== List of Sepahan records ==
=== FIFA Club World Cup participation ===
FIFA Club World Cup History
Year	Round	Score	Result	Scorers
2007	Play-off	Sepahan 3 – 1 (New Zealand) Waitakere United	Win	Emad Mohammed 3', 4'; Abdul-Wahab 47'
2007	Quarterfinals	Sepahan 1 – 3 (Japan) Urawa Red Diamonds	Loss	Karimi 80'

=== Top scorers by season ===
Season	Player	in League	Player	in whole season
2001–02	(Iran) Edmond Bezik	6		
2002–03	(Iran) Edmond Bezik	13		
2003–04	(Iran) Rasoul Khatibi	8	(Iran) Rasoul Khatibi	14
2004–05	(Iran) Rasoul Khatibi	14	(Iran) Rasoul Khatibi	17
2005–06	(Iran) Rasoul Khatibi	10	(Iran) Rasoul Khatibi	11
2006–07	(Iraq) Emad Mohammed Ridha	9	(Iraq) Emad Mohammed Ridha	12
2007–08	(Iran) Mahmoud Karimi	9	(Iran) Mahmoud Karimi	13
2008–09	(Iraq) Emad Mohammed Ridha	14	(Iraq) Emad Mohammed Ridha	16
2009–10	(Iraq) Emad Mohammed Ridha	19	(Senegal) Ibrahima Touré	20
2010–11	(Senegal) Ibrahima Touré	18	(Senegal) Ibrahima Touré	24
2011–12	(Iraq) Emad Mohammed Ridha	9	(Brazil) Bruno Correa	12
2012–13	(Iran) Mohammad Reza Khalatbari	13	(Albania) Xhevahir Sukaj	16
2013–14	(Iran) Mehdi Sharifi	8	(Iran) Mehdi Sharifi	12
2014–15	(Iran) Mehdi Sharifi	12	(Iran) Mehdi Sharifi	12
2015–16	(Iran) Mohammad Reza Khalatbari (Brazil) Luciano Chimba	4	(Brazil) Luciano Chimba (Iran) Mehdi Sharifi	6
2016–17	(Iran) Mehrdad Mohammadi (Iran) Masoud Hassanzadeh	7	(Iran) Mehrdad Mohammadi (Iran) Masoud Hassanzadeh (Iran) Jalaleddin Alimohammadi	7
2017–18	(Iran) Sasan Ansari	11	(Iran) Sasan Ansari	11
2018–19	(Brazil) Kiros Stanlley	16	(Brazil) Kiros Stanlley	17

=== Players on international cups ===
Cup	Players
(Argentina) 1978 FIFA World Cup	(Iran) Ali Shojaei (Iran) Bahram Mavaddat
(Germany) 2006 FIFA World Cup	(Iran) Moharram Navidkia (Iran) Rasoul Khatibi
(Thailand) (Vietnam) (Malaysia) (Indonesia) 2007 AFC Asian Cup	(Iran) Hadi Aghily
(South Africa) 2009 FIFA Confederations Cup	(Iraq) Abdul-Wahab Abu Al-Hail (Iraq) Emad Mohammed
(Qatar) 2011 AFC Asian Cup	(Iran) Ehsan Hajsafi (Iran) Hadi Aghily (Iran) Jalal Hosseini (Iran) Khosro Heydari (Iran) Mehdi Rahmati (Iran) Mohsen Bengar (Iraq) Emad Mohammed
(Brazil) 2014 FIFA World Cup	(Iran) Ehsan Hajsafi (Iran) Rahman Ahmadi
(Australia) 2015 AFC Asian Cup	(Iran) Ehsan Hajsafi (Iran) Voria Ghafouri
(United Arab Emirates) 2019 AFC Asian Cup	(Iran) Payam Niazmand
(Qatar) 2022 FIFA World Cup	(Iran) Payam Niazmand (Iran) Ramin Rezaeian

== Sponsorship ==
=== Shirt sponsors and manufacturers ===
Sepahan League Sponsors
Period	Kit Manufacturer	Shirt Sponsor
2007–08	(Germany) Uhlsport	Mobarakeh Steel Company
2008–09	(Germany) Uhlsport	Mobarakeh Steel Company
2009–10	(Italy) Lotto	Mobarakeh Steel Company
2010–11	(Italy) Lotto	Mobarakeh Steel Company
2011–12	(Italy) Lotto	Mobarakeh Steel Company
2012–13	(Italy) Lotto	Mobarakeh Steel Company
2013–14	(Germany) Uhlsport	Mobarakeh Steel Company
2014–15	(Germany) Uhlsport	Mobarakeh Steel Company
2015–16	(Spain) Joma	Mobarakeh Steel Company
2016–17	(Germany) Uhlsport	Mobarakeh Steel Company
2017–18	(China) Peak	Mobarakeh Steel Company / Snapp
2018–19	(Iran) Start	Mobarakeh Steel Company / Taban Air / Hamrah-e-Avval
2019–20	(Germany) Uhlsport	Mobarakeh Steel Company / Taban Air / Hamrah-e-Avval
2020–21	(Germany) Uhlsport	Mobarakeh Steel Company / Iran Insurance Company
2021–22	(Germany) Uhlsport	Mobarakeh Steel Company / Iran Insurance Company
2022-23	(Iran) Merooj	Mobarakeh Steel Company / Bahonar Brokerage / GERAD Clothing
2023-24	(Iran) Start	Mobarakeh Steel Company
