= 2019–20 Esteghlal F.C. season =

Esteghlal F.C.
2019–20 season
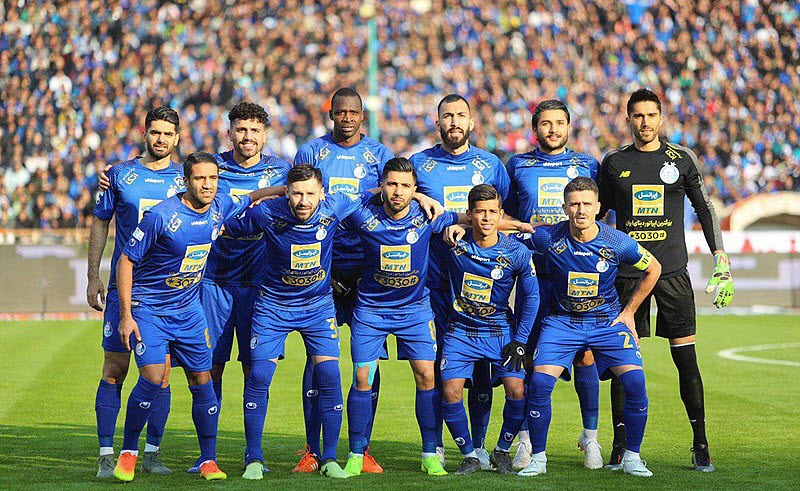
- President: Amirhossein Fathi (until 10 December 2019); Esmaeil Khalilzadeh (from 10 December 2019 until 26 February 2020); Ali Fatollahzadeh (from 26 February 2020 until 30 March 2020); Ahmad Saadatmand (from 30 March 2020)
- Head coach: Andrea Stramaccioni (until 8 December 2019); Voria Ghafouri (caretaker) (from 9 december 2019 until 2 January 2020); Farhad Majidi (from 2 January 2020 until 3 September 2020); Majid Namjoo-Motlagh (from 6 September 2020)
- Stadium: Azadi Stadium
- Pro League: 2nd
- Hazfi Cup: Runners-up
- AFC Champions League: Round of 16
- Top goalscorer: League: Cheick Diabaté (15); All: Cheick Diabaté (19)
- Highest home attendance: 65,000 (vs Shahr Khodro, 5 December 2019)
- Lowest home attendance: 9,000 (vs Naft MIS, 2 February 2020)
- Biggest win: Esteghlal 5–0 Sanat Naft; Al-Rayyan 0–5 Esteghlal
- Biggest defeat: Esteghlal 1–2 Machine Sazi; Al-Ahli 2–1 Esteghlal
Home colours	Away colours	Third colours

The 2019–20 season is the Esteghlal Football Club's 19th season in the Iran Pro League, and their 26th consecutive season in the top division of Iranian football. They also competed in the Hazfi Cup, and 74th year in existence as a football club.

== Players ==
=== First team squad ===
Last updated: 2 February 2020

No.	Name	Nat	Position	Date of birth (age)	Since	End	Signed from
Goalkeepers
1	Hossein Hosseini	(Iran)	GK	30 June 1992 (aged 27)	2012	2021	(Iran) Youth Sector
19	Hossein Pour Hamidi	(Iran)	GK	26 March 1998 (aged 21)	2019	2022	(Iran) Esteghlal Khuzestan
78	Alireza Ansari	(Iran)	GK	6 February 2000 (aged 19)	2019	2020	(Iran) Youth Sector
Defenders
3	Milad Zakipour	(Iran)	LB / LM	23 November 1995 (aged 24)	2016	2021	(Iran) Naft Tehran
4	Roozbeh Cheshmi	(Iran)	CB / DM	24 July 1993 (aged 26)	2015	2020	(Iran) Saba Qom
5	Aref Gholami	(Iran)	CB / RB / LB	19 April 1997 (aged 22)	2019	2021	(Iran) Foolad
21	Vouria Ghafouri	(Iran)	RB / RW	20 September 1987 (aged 32)	2016	2021	(Iran) Sepahan
22	Siavash Yazdani	(Iran)	CB	2 March 1992 (aged 27)	2019	2021	(Iran) Sepahan
30	Azim Gök	(Iran)	CB / LB	25 January 1996 (aged 23)	2016	2021	(Iran) Youth Sector
32	Amirhossein Kargar	(Iran)	RB	22 November 1998 (aged 21)	2018	2021	(Iran) Youth Sector
33	Hrvoje Milić	(Croatia)	LB / LM	10 May 1989 (aged 30)	2019	2021	(Italy) Crotone
41	Arash Dajliri	(Iran)	RB	19 January 1999 (aged 20)	2020		(Iran) Youth Sector
57	Shahin Taherkhani	(Iran)	CB	7 January 1997 (aged 22)	2018	2021	(Iran) Youth Sector
70	Mohammad Daneshgar	(Iran)	CB	20 January 1994 (aged 25)	2018	2020	(Iran) Saipa
Midfielders
6	Ali Karimi	(Iran)	CM / DM	11 February 1994 (aged 25)	2018	2020	(Iran) Sepahan
8	Farshid Esmaeili	(Iran)	AM / LW / RW	23 February 1994 (aged 25)	2015	2020	(Iran) Fajr Sepasi
9	Ali Dashti	(Iran)	RW / SS	18 January 1994 (aged 25)	2018	2021	(Iran) Saipa
14	Farshid Bagheri	(Iran)	DM / CM	5 June 1992 (aged 27)	2016	2020	(Iran) Saba Qom
15	Sina Khadempour	(Iran)	DM / CM / CB	9 January 1997 (aged 22)	2017	2022	(Iran) Naft Tehran
23	Dariush Shojaeian	(Iran)	AM / RW / LW	7 April 1992 (aged 27)	2017	2020	(Iran) Gostaresh Foulad
28	Mohsen Karimi	(Iran)	LW / RW / SS	20 September 1994 (aged 25)	2014	2020	(Iran) Youth Sector
40	Amir Hossein Khodamoradi	(Iran)	AM	13 September 2000 (aged 19)	2020	2024	(Iran) Youth Sector
66	Masoud Rigi	(Iran)	DM / CM	22 February 1991 (aged 28)	2019	2021	(Iran) Shahr Khodro
77	Reza Azari	(Iran)	DM / CM / AM	10 February 1998 (aged 21)	2018	2023	(Iran) Youth Sector
80	Mohammad Bolboli	(Iran)	LW	11 January 1998 (aged 21)	2019	2023	(Iran) Sepidrood
88	Arash Rezavand	(Iran)	AM / CM	5 October 1993 (aged 26)	2019	2021	(Iran) Saipa
Forwards
7	Cheick Diabaté	(Mali)	CF / SS	25 April 1988 (aged 31)	2019	2021	(Turkey) Osmanlıspor
10	Mehdi Ghayedi	(Iran)	SS / RW / LW	5 December 1998 (aged 21)	2017	2023	(Iran) Iranjavan
11	Morteza Tabrizi	(Iran)	CF / LW	6 January 1991 (aged 28)	2018	2020	(Iran) Zob Ahan
17	Zakaria Moradi	(Iran)	CF / RW	14 August 1998 (aged 21)	2019	2023	(Iran) Youth Sector
72	Amir Arsalan Motahari	(Iran)	CF / RW	10 March 1993 (aged 26)	2020	2021	(Iran) Zob Ahan
Players transferred during the season
99	Sajjad Aghaei	(Iran)	CF / LW / RW	19 March 1999 (aged 20)	2017	2022	(Iran) Youth Sector
20	Nikolay Bodurov	(Bulgaria)	CB	30 May 1986 (aged 33)	2020	2021	Unattached

== Transfers ==
=== In ===
No.	Pos.	Nat.	Name	Age	Moving from	Type	Transfer window	Ends	Source
—		(Iran)	Hamed Bakhshi	18	Peykan	Transfer	Summer		
80	LW	(Iran)	Mohammad Bolboli	21	Sepidrood	Transfer	Summer	2023	
9	RW	(Iran)	Ali Dashti	25	Saipa	Transfer	Summer	2021	
44	CB	(Iran)	Milad Bagheri	23	Mes Kerman	Transfer	Summer	2022	
22	CB	(Iran)	Siavash Yazdani	27	Sepahan	Transfer	Summer	2021	
66	DM	(Iran)	Masoud Rigi	28	Shahr Khodro	Transfer	Summer	2021	
15	DM	(Iran)	Sina Khadempour	22	Gol Gohar	End of loan	Summer	2022	
70	RW	(Iran)	Mohammad Javad Mohammadi	23	Arvand Karun	End of loan	Summer	2022	
80	RW	(Iran)	Mohammad Dehghan Nejad	19	Saipa	Transfer	Winter	2020	
88	AM	(Iran)	Arash Rezavand	25	Saipa	Transfer	Summer	2021	
7	CF	(Mali)	Cheick Diabaté	31	(Turkey) Osmanlıspor	Transfer	Summer	2021	
38	CM	(Iran)	Ali Tari	18	Zob Ahan	Transfer	Summer	2024	
5	CB	(Iran)	Aref Gholami	22	Foolad	Transfer	Summer	2021	
—	GK	(Iran)	Erfan Khalili	19	Niroo Zamini	Transfer	Summer	2020	
19	GK	(Iran)	Hossein Pour Hamidi	21	Esteghlal Khuzestan	Transfer	Summer	2022	
33	LB	(Croatia)	Hrvoje Milić	30	(Italy) Crotone	Transfer	Summer	2021	
—	LW	(Iran)	Hossein Bijani	16	Foolad	Transfer	Summer	2022	
30	CB	(Iran)	Azim Gök	23	Malavan	End of loan	Winter	2021	
72	CF	(Iran)	Amir Arsalan Motahari	26	Zob Ahan	Transfer	Winter	2021	
20	CB	(Bulgaria)	Nikolay Bodurov	33	Unattached	Transfer	Winter	2021	

=== Out ===
No.	Pos.	Nat.	Name	Age	Moving to	Type	Transfer window	Source
—	GK	(Iran)	Sasan Zamaneh	20	Persepolis	Transfer	Summer	
—	GK	(Iran)	Parsa Jafari	19	Saipa	Transfer	Summer	
2	RB	(Iran)	Khosro Heydari	35	Retired	End of contract	Summer	
1	GK	(Iran)	Mehdi Rahmati	36	Shahr Khodro	End of contract	Summer	
—	GK	(Iran)	Mohammad Javad Kia	17	Shahr Khodro	Transfer	Summer	
44	RB	(Iran)	Farshad Mohammadi	24	Shahr Khodro	Transfer	Summer	
12	LB	(Iran)	Meysam Teymouri	26	Tractor Sazi	Transfer	Summer	
5	AM	(South Africa)	Ayanda Patosi	26	(South Africa) Cape Town	Loan return	Summer	
26	CF	(Iran)	Fardin Najafi	21	Oghab Tehran	Loan	Summer	
30	DM	(Iran)	Omid Noorafkan	22	(Belgium) Charleroi	Loan return	Summer	
16	RW	(Iran)	Allahyar Sayyadmanesh	18	(Turkey) Fenerbahçe	Transfer	Summer	
29	LB	(Iran)	Amirhossein Esmaeilzadeh	19	Pars Jonoubi	Transfer	Summer	
88	RW	(Iran)	Reza Karimi	20	Unattached	Released	Summer	
90	CF	(Nigeria)	Godwin Mensha	29	(United Arab Emirates) Ajman	Transfer	Summer	
—	LW	(Iran)	Ahmadreza Ahmadvand	20	Persepolis	Transfer	Summer	
13	LB	(Iran)	Armin Sohrabian	23	Saipa	Transfer	Summer	
10	CF	(Iran)	Rouhollah Bagheri	28	Shahr Khodro	Transfer	Summer	
27	AM	(Iran)	Hossein Heydari	20	Qashqai	Transfer	Summer	
70	RW	(Iran)	Mohammad Javad Mohammadi	23	Sorkhpooshan	Transfer	Summer	
43	LB	(Iran)	Amirhossein Pourmohammad	21	Sorkhpooshan	Transfer	Summer	
17	LW	(Iraq)	Humam Tariq	23	(Egypt) Ismaily	Transfer	Summer	
33	CB	(Iran)	Pejman Montazeri	35	(Qatar) Al Kharitiyat	End of contract	Summer	
38	CF	(Iran)	Meraj Pourtaghi	21	Damash Gilan	Transfer	Summer	
22	GK	(Iran)	Mehdi Nourollahi	22	Saipa	Transfer	Summer	
20	CF	(Guinea-Bissau)	Esmaël Gonçalves	28	(Japan) Matsumoto Yamaga	Transfer	Summer	
44	CB	(Iran)	Milad Bagheri	24	Pars Jonoubi	Transfer	Winter	
98	RW	(Iran)	Morteza Aghakhan	26	Saipa	Transfer	Winter	
99	CF	(Iran)	Sajjad Aghaei	20	Zob Ahan	Loan	Winter	

== Pre-season and friendlies ==
30 June 2019 1	Esteghlal	5 – 0	Esteghlal B	Tehran
19:15 IRDT (UTC+04:30)	M. Tabrizi 8' (pen.), 38'; R. Bagheri 16'; A. Dashti 64'; M. Bolboli	Report

4 July 2019 2	Esteghlal	1 – 1	Niroo Zamini	Tehran
18:40 IRDT (UTC+04:30)	D. Shojaeian 9'	Report	A. Akvan 45'

11 July 2019 3	Esteghlal (Iran)	5 – 0	(Nigeria) Heartland	Turkey
18:00 TRT (UTC+03:00)	M. Zakipour 18'; S. Aghaei 20', 39'; M. Tabrizi 59'; A. Dashti 65'	Report

17 July 2019 4	Esteghlal (Iran)	3 – 1	(Romania) Petrolul Ploiești	Turkey
18:00 TRT (UTC+03:00)	S. Aghaei 22'; D. Shojaeian 63'; A. Dashti 75'	Report	12'

25 July 2019 5	Esteghlal	4 – 2	Baadraan Tehran	Tehran
18:30 IRDT (UTC+04:30)	Diabate 34'; Esmaeili 40'; Tabrizi 66'; F.Bagheri 70'	Report	Vakili 10'; Ebrahimi 12'

1 August 2019 6	Esteghlal	4 – 0	Machine Sazi	Tehran
18:30 IRDT (UTC+04:30)	Shojaeian 26'; Esmaeili 30'; Daneshgar 50'; Dashti 90'

5 August 2019 7	Esteghlal	4 – 0	Esteghlal U-20	Tehran
18:30 IRDT (UTC+04:30)

12 August 2019 8	Esteghlal	0–2	Paykan	Tehran
18:00 IRDT (UTC+04:30)

15 August 2019 9	Esteghlal	5–0	Oghab	Tehran
09:30 IRDT (UTC+04:30)

== Competitions ==
=== Overview ===
Competition	First match	Last match	Starting round	Final position	Record							
Competition	First match	Last match	Starting round	Final position	Pld	W	D	L	GF	GA	GD	Win %
Pro League	22 August 2019	20 August 2020	Matchday 1	2nd	30	14	11	5	55	31	+24	46.67
Hazfi Cup	30 September 2019	3 September 2020	Round of 32	Runners-up	5	3	1	1	12	6	+6	60.00
AFC Champions League	21 January 2020	26 September 2020	Preliminary round 2	Round of 16	7	3	2	2	15	6	+9	42.86
Total					42	20	14	8	82	43	+39	47.62

Last updated: 27 September 2020.
Source: Competitions

=== Persian Gulf Pro League ===
==== Results summary ====
Overall								Home						Away					
Pld	W	D	L	GF	GA	GD	Pts	W	D	L	GF	GA	GD	W	D	L	GF	GA	GD
30	14	11	5	55	31	+24	53	8	5	2	25	12	+13	6	6	3	30	19	+11

Last updated: 21 August 2020.
Source: Ipl Stats

==== Results by round ====
Round	1	2	3	4	5	6	7	8	9	10	11	12	13	14	15	16	17	18	19	20	21	22	23	24	25	26	27	28	29	30
Ground	A	H	A	H	A	H	A	H	A	H	A	A	H	A	H	H	A	H	A	H	A	H	A	H	A	H	H	A	H	A
Result	L	D	D	L	D	W	W	W	W	W	W	D	W	D	W	L	L	W	D	W	L	D	L	D	W	D	W	D	D	W
Position	12	12	11	15	14	11	8	7	7	4	3	3	1	2	2	5	5	4	4	3	4	5	4	5	2	2	2	2	2	2

Updated to match(es) played on 21 August 2020. Source: "Ipl".
A = Away; H = Home; W = Win; D = Draw; L = Loss; P = Postponed

==== League table ====
Pos	Team	Pld	W	D	L	GF	GA	GD	Pts	Qualification or relegation
1	Persepolis (C)	30	21	4	5	46	17	+29	67	Qualification for 2021 AFC Champions League group stage
2	Esteghlal	30	14	11	5	55	31	+24	53	Qualification for 2021 AFC Champions League group stage
3	Foolad	30	14	9	7	28	19	+9	51	Qualification for 2021 AFC Champions League qualifying play-offs
4	Tractor	30	14	8	8	31	23	+8	50	Qualification for 2021 AFC Champions League group stage (Note: Tractor qualified to AFC Champions League group stage directly by winning the Hazfi Cup)
5	Sepahan	30	12	13	5	39	22	+17	49	

Source: IPL Table, Soccerway
Rules for classification: 1) Points; 2) Goal difference; 3) Goals scored.
(C) Champions

==== Matches ====
Win Draw Loss Postponed/Cancelled

23 August 2019 1	Machine Sazi	1 – 0	Esteghlal	Tabriz
18:00 IRDT (UTC+04:30)	Sh. Saghebi (yellow card) 13'; M. Khorram (yellow card) 33'; H. Lak (yellow card) 81'; A. Zarei 90+5'	Report	A. Karimi (yellow card) 19'; F. Esmaeili (yellow card) 55'; Ch. Diabaté (yellow card) 78'; M. Daneshgar (red card) 90+3'	Stadium: Bonyan Diesel Stadium; Attendance: 3,700; Referee: Payam Heydari

29 August 2019 2	Esteghlal	1 – 1	Foolad	Tehran
19:00 IRDT (UTC+04:30)	F. Esmaeili 49'; Ch. Diabaté (yellow card) 77'; A. Dashti (yellow card) 90'; H. Hosseini (yellow card) 90+3'	Report	Sh. Gordan (yellow card) 19'; A. Bagherpour 90+5'	Stadium: Azadi Stadium; Attendance: 20,000; Referee: Alireza Faghani

15 September 2019 3	Naft MIS	1 – 1	Esteghlal	Masjed Soleyman
19:45 IRDT (UTC+04:30)	H. Noormohammadi 70'; A. Alizadeh (yellow card) 76'	Report	F. Esmaeili (yellow card) 10' (yellow-red card) 87'; M. Ghayedi 16'	Stadium: Behnam Mohammadi Stadium; Attendance: 5,000; Referee: Mohammadreza Akbarian

22 September 2019 4	Esteghlal	0 – 1	Persepolis	Tehran
16:00 IRST (UTC+03:30)	A. Karimi (penalty missed) 28' (yellow card) 30' (yellow-red card) 89'; M. Tabrizi (yellow card) 42'; D. Shojaeian (yellow card) 75'; A. Gholami (yellow card) 90+4'	Report	H. Kanaanizadegan (yellow card) 42'; H. Hosseini 81' (o.g.); F. Ahmadzadeh (yellow card) 90+3'; S. Nemati (yellow card) 90+4'	Stadium: Azadi Stadium; Attendance: 58,000; Referee: Mouood Bonyadifar
Note: 91st Tehran derby

26 September 2019 5	Zob Ahan	2 – 2	Esteghlal	Isfahan
18:30 IRST (UTC+03:30)	M. Nejadmehdi (yellow card) 32'; D. Esmaeilifar 73'; A. Motahari 90+1'	Report	M. Daneshgar (yellow card) 87'; D. Shojaeian 67'; F. Esmaeili 89'	Stadium: Foolad Shahr Stadium; Attendance: 5,000; Referee: Bijan Heydari

4 October 2019 6	Esteghlal	2 – 1	Gol Gohar	Tehran
16:00 IRST (UTC+03:30)	H. Milić 6'; M. Ghayedi 49'; A. Rezavand (yellow card) 87'	Report	B. Barzay 11' (pen.); M. Farahani (yellow card) 42'	Stadium: Azadi Stadium; Attendance: 0 (NC); Referee: Hassan Akrami

21 October 2019 7	Saipa	0 – 4	Esteghlal	Shahr-e Qods
16:45 IRST (UTC+03:30)	M. Soleimani (yellow card) 45'	Report	A. Gholami 9'; D. Shojaeian (yellow card) 22'; Daneshgar 50'; V. Ghafouri 68' (pen.); S. Aghaei 89'	Stadium: Shahr-e Qods Stadium; Attendance: 2,000; Referee: Ashkan Khorshidi

25 October 2019 8	Esteghlal	2 – 0	Pars Jonoubi	Tehran
19:00 IRST (UTC+03:30)	A. Karimi 28'; M. Zakipour (yellow card) 36'; M. Ghayedi 45'; M. Tabrizi (yellow card) 90'	Report	F. Gerami (yellow card) 87'; A. Abdollahzadeh (yellow card) 88'	Stadium: Azadi Stadium; Attendance: 20,000; Referee: Seyed Reza Mahdavi

1 November 2019 9	Tractor	2 – 4	Esteghlal	Tabriz
18:00 IRST (UTC+03:30)	M.R. Azadi 20'; W. Mimbela (yellow card) 67'; S. Ansari 79'	Report	Ch. Diabaté 40', 65', 69'; M. Rigi (yellow card) 82'; A. Karimi 84'	Stadium: Yadegar-e Emam Stadium; Attendance: 80,000; Referee: Bijan Heydari

5 November 2019 10	Esteghlal	5 – 0	Sanat Naft	Tehran
15:30 IRST (UTC+03:30)	Ch. Diabaté (yellow card) 5' (goal) 20'; M. Daneshgar 9'; M. Ghayedi 26'; V. Ghafouri 30'; H. Milić 72'	Report	N. Salari (yellow card) 20'; M. Hanafi (yellow card) 71'	Stadium: Azadi Stadium; Attendance: 20,000; Referee: Mohammad Hossein Zahedifar

25 November 2019 11	Nassaji	1 – 2	Esteghlal	Qaem Shahr
15:30 IRST (UTC+03:30)	M. Abbaszadeh 61'; M. Nazari (yellow card) 64'; R. Aliyari (yellow card) 72'	Report	M. Rigi (yellow card) 6'; A. Karimi 33'; M. Ghayedi 49'; A. Dashti (yellow card) 75'	Stadium: Vatani Stadium; Attendance: 15,000; Referee: Ali Safaei

30 November 2019 12	Sepahan	2 – 2	Esteghlal	Isfahan
15:00 IRST (UTC+03:30)	G. Gvelesiani 14'; S. Shahbazzadeh (yellow card) 60'; O. Noorafkan 90+5'	Report	M. Ghayedi 33'; Ch. Diabaté 49'	Stadium: Naghsh-e Jahan Stadium; Attendance: 45,000; Referee: Mohammad Hossein Zahedifar

5 December 2019 13	Esteghlal	1 – 0	Shahr Khodro	Tehran
15:00 IRST (UTC+03:30)	Ch. Diabaté (yellow card) 37' (goal) 61'; A. Gholami (yellow card) 45+2'; A. Dashti (yellow card) 85'	Report	A. Ghaseminejad (yellow card) 21'	Stadium: Azadi Stadium; Attendance: 65,000; Referee: Ashkan Khorshidi

9 December 2019 14	Paykan	2 – 2	Esteghlal	Tehran
17:30 IRST (UTC+03:30)	M. Mousavi (yellow card) 18'; F. Emamali (yellow card) 23' (goal) 33'; Sh. Moghanlou (yellow card) 24' (penalty missed) 44'; H. Pour-Amini 90+4'	Report	M. Ghayedi 9'; V. Ghafouri 59'; R. Cheshmi (yellow card) 74'	Stadium: Azadi Stadium; Attendance: 10,000; Referee: Mouood Bonyadifar

14 December 2019 15	Esteghlal	4 – 1	Shahin Bushehr	Tehran
15:00 IRST (UTC+03:30)	A. Rezavand 29'; M. Ghayedi 52'; M. Daneshgar 58'; H. Milić (yellow card) 64'; Ch. Diabaté 69'	Report	A. Safarzadeh (yellow card) 35'; M.S. Barani (yellow card) 62'; H. Maleki 87'	Stadium: Azadi Stadium; Attendance: 10,000; Referee: Ali Bay

19 December 2019 16	Esteghlal	1 – 2	Machine Sazi	Tehran
17:30 IRST (UTC+03:30)	M. Rigi (yellow card) 22'; Ch. Diabaté 23'; V. Ghafouri (yellow card) 37'; M. Daneshgar (yellow card) 45+3'; R. Cheshmi (yellow card) 50'; A. Rezavand (yellow card) 64'	Report	M. Ghaderi 34'; A. Alekasir (yellow card) 38'; H. Lak (yellow card) 45+3'; A. Zendehrouh 52' (pen.) F. Abedini (red card) 90+1'	Stadium: Azadi Stadium; Attendance: 15,010; Referee: Seyyed Vahid Kazemi

24 June 2020 17	Foolad	2 – 1	Esteghlal	Ahvaz
21:00 IRDT (UTC+04:30)	M. Coulibaly 27'; F. Ahmadzadeh (yellow card) 48'; M. Najjarian 80'; L. Pereira (yellow card) 86'; Z. Niknafs (yellow card) 88'	Report	R. Cheshmi 12'; A. Karimi (red card) 45'; A. Gholami (yellow card) 54' (yellow-red card) 65'; M. Ghayedi (yellow card) 72'	Stadium: Foolad Arena; Attendance: 0 (NC); Referee: Seyyed Mehdi Seyyad Ali
Note: The match was postponed and rescheduled to 24 June. The match was played behind closed doors.

2 February 2020 18	Esteghlal	2 – 1	Naft MIS	Tehran
17:00 IRST (UTC+03:30)	M. Ghayedi 35'; A. Motahari 51'	Report	A. Ghasemi 20'; S. Sadeghi (yellow card) 32'; H. Noormohammadi (yellow card) 67'; M. Eydi (yellow card) 85'	Stadium: Azadi Stadium; Attendance: 9,000; Referee: Hamid Haj-Malek

6 February 2020 19	Persepolis	2 – 2	Esteghlal	Tehran
15:30 IRST (UTC+03:30)	A. Alipour 29' (yellow card) 30'; C. Osaguona (yellow card) 55'; B. Resan 89'	Report	A. Motahari 24', 52'	Stadium: Azadi Stadium; Attendance: 56,780; Referee: Bijan Heydari; Man of the Match: Amir Arsalan Motahari
Note: 92nd Tehran derby

23 February 2020 20	Esteghlal	2 – 1	Zob Ahan	Tehran
18:30 IRST (UTC+03:30)	A. Dashti (yellow card) 8'; M. Daneshgar 29'; V. Ghafouri 52'	Report	D. Bjedov 49'; E. Pahlevan (yellow card) 63'; Gh. Haddadifar (yellow card) 90+1'; M. Haghdoost (yellow card) 90+2'	Stadium: Azadi Stadium; Attendance: 0 (NC); Referee: Payam Heydari
Note: No spectator due to the COVID-19 pandemic

27 February 2020 21	Gol Gohar	1 – 0	Esteghlal	Sirjan
16:00 IRST (UTC+03:30)	A. Ebrahimi 61'	Report		Stadium: Gol Gohar Sport Complex; Attendance: 0 (NC); Referee: Mohammadreza Akbarian
Note: No spectator due to the COVID-19 pandemic

29 June 2020 22	Esteghlal	1 – 1	Saipa	Tehran
21:00 IRDT (UTC+04:30)	M. Daneshgar (yellow card) 54'; M. Rigi 70'	Report	Kh. Shafiei (yellow card) 27'; F. Bagheri 45' (o.g.); H.Fallahzadeh (yellow card) 90+1'	Stadium: Azadi Stadium; Attendance: 0 (NC); Referee: Payam Heydari
Note: The match was postponed due to the COVID-19 pandemic and rescheduled to 29 June. The match was played behind closed doors.

27 July 2020 23	Pars Jonoubi	0 – 2	Esteghlal	Jam
20:30 IRDT (UTC+04:30)	F. Gerami (yellow card) 55' (yellow-red card) 90+4'; M. Nouri (penalty missed) 81'	Report	A. Karimi 26'; A. Rezavand (yellow card) 46'; Ch. Diabaté 62'; H. Hosseini (yellow card) 80'	Stadium: Takhti Stadium; Attendance: 0 (NC); Referee: Payam Heydari
Note: The match was postponed due to the COVID-19 pandemic and rescheduled to 27 July. The match was played behind closed doors.

11 July 2020 24	Esteghlal	0 – 0	Tractor	Tehran
21:00 IRDT (UTC+04:30)	A. Dashti (yellow card) 2'; A. Rezavand (yellow card) 53'; M. Zakipour (yellow card) 81'; M. Rigi (yellow card) 85'	Report	A. Imani (yellow card) 53'	Stadium: Azadi Stadium; Attendance: 0 (NC); Referee: Hassan Akrami
Note: The match was postponed due to the COVID-19 pandemic and rescheduled to 11 July. The match was played behind closed doors.

17 July 2020 25	Sanat Naft	0 – 2	Esteghlal	Abadan
21:00 IRDT (UTC+04:30)	M. Ahmadi (yellow card) 28'	Report	Ch. Diabaté 30'; A. Rezavand (yellow card) 36'; A. Motahari 90+5'	Stadium: Takhti Abadan; Attendance: 0 (NC); Referee: Ashkan Khorshidi
Note: The match was postponed due to the COVID-19 pandemic and rescheduled to 17 July. The match was played behind closed doors.

23 July 2020 26	Esteghlal	1 – 1	Nassaji	Tehran
21:00 IRDT (UTC+04:30)	M. Rigi (yellow card) 11'; Ch. Diabaté 40' (pen.); F. Bagheri (yellow card) 64'	Report	H. Mahini (yellow card) 45'; M. Miri 66'; R. Jafari (yellow card) 90'	Stadium: Azadi Stadium; Attendance: 0 (NC); Referee: Reza Kermanshahi
Note: The match was postponed due to the COVID-19 pandemic and rescheduled to 23 July. The match was played behind closed doors.

1 August 2020 27	Esteghlal	2 – 1	Sepahan	Tehran
21:30 IRDT (UTC+04:30)	A. Rezavand (yellow card) 38' (yellow-red card) 44'; V. Ghafouri (yellow card) 42'; Ch. Diabaté 52' (pen.); Sh. Mosleh 65' (o.g.)	Report	O. Noorafkan (yellow card) 42'; Sh. Mosleh (yellow card) 51'; M. Mohebi 82'	Stadium: Azadi Stadium; Attendance: 0 (NC); Referee: Bijan Heydari
Note: The match was postponed due to the COVID-19 pandemic and rescheduled to 1 August. The match was played behind closed doors.

6 August 2020 28	Shahr Khodro	2 – 2	Esteghlal	Mashhad
20:00 IRDT (UTC+04:30)	H. Mehraban 35'; A. Sadeghi (yellow card) 36'; A. Nemati (yellow card) 67'; M.R. Khalatbari 74' (yellow card) 81'; H. Moradmand (yellow card) 90+4'	Report	A. Motahari 55'; Ch. Diabaté 70' (pen.); A. Karimi (yellow card) 79'; M. Ghayedi (yellow card) 83'	Stadium: Imam Reza Stadium; Attendance: 0 (NC); Referee: Vahid Kazemi
Note: The match was postponed due to the COVID-19 pandemic and rescheduled to 6 August. The match was played behind closed doors.

15 August 2020 29	Esteghlal	1 – 1	Paykan	Tehran
20:45 IRDT (UTC+04:30)	A. Karimi 37'	Report	F. Emamali 23' (yellow card) 58'; A. Karimi (yellow card) 27'	Stadium: Azadi Stadium; Attendance: 0 (NC); Referee: Payam Heydari
Note: The match was postponed due to the COVID-19 pandemic and rescheduled to 15 August. The match was played behind closed doors.

20 August 2020 30	Shahin Bushehr	1 – 4	Esteghlal	Bushehr
20:45 IRDT (UTC+04:30)	M. Sarlak 24'; A. Mousazadeh (yellow card) 28'; A. Darvishvand (yellow card) 47'; S. Bahrani (yellow card) 90+4'	Report	V. Ghafouri 47'; Ch. Diabaté 65', 82'; M. Ghayedi 72'	Stadium: Shahid Beheshti Stadium; Attendance: 0 (NC); Referee: Aliasghar Momeni
Note: The match was postponed due to the COVID-19 pandemic and rescheduled to 20 August. The match was played behind closed doors.

=== Hazfi Cup ===
==== Round of 32 ====
30 September 2019 Round of 32	Gol Reyhan	1 – 3 (a.e.t.)	Esteghlal	Karaj
18:15 IRST (UTC+03:30)	K. Mirzaei (yellow card) 30'; M. Papi 38' (red card) 112'; M. Mehrazma (yellow card) 75'	Report	A. Dashti (yellow card) 25'; H. Divsalar 43' (o.g.); M. Tabrizi (penalty missed) 56'; S. Aghaei 93'; M. Daneshgar (yellow card) 98'; A. Karimi (yellow card) 110'; F. Esmaeili 113'	Stadium: Enghelab Stadium; Attendance: 9,000; Referee: Seyed Mehdi Seyed Ali

==== Round of 16 ====
17 October 2019 Round of 16	Esteghlal	3 – 0 (a.e.t.)	Fajr Sepasi	Tehran
16:50 IRST (UTC+03:30)	F. Esmaeili (yellow card) 63'; V. Ghafouri 112'; S. Aghaei 118'; D. Shojaeian 120'	Report	M. Gharibi (yellow card) 56'	Stadium: Azadi Stadium; Attendance: 3,000; Referee: Payam Heydari

==== Quarter-final ====
10 August 2020 Quarter-Final	Esteghlal	2 – 0	Sepahan	Tehran
20:30 IRDT (UTC+04:30)	M. Rigi (yellow card) 28'; V. Ghafouri 45' (pen.); A. Karimi 61'; H. Hosseini (yellow card) 66'	Report	Sh. Mosleh (yellow card) 33'; Kiros Stanlley (yellow card) 40'; M.R. Hosseini (yellow card) 90+3'	Stadium: Azadi Stadium; Attendance: 0 (NC); Referee: Mouood Bonyadifar
Note: The remainder of the competition, held in August 2020, will be played behind closed doors due to the COVID-19 pandemic in Iran.

==== Semi-final ====
26 August 2020 Semi-Final	Persepolis	2 – 2 (a.e.t.) (1-4 p)	Esteghlal	Tehran
19:00 IRDT (UTC+04:30)	S. Nemati (yellow card) 45'; B. Resan 49'; A. Alipour 88'; Sh. Khalilzadeh (yellow card) 117'; M. Torabi (yellow card) 120'	Report	M. Ghayedi 4'; M. Daneshgar 90+3'; A. Gholami (yellow card) 114'	Stadium: Azadi Stadium; Attendance: 0 (NC); Referee: Payam Heydari
	Penalties
	A. Nourollahi (penalty missed); O. Alishah (penalty scored); Ch. Osaguona (penalty missed)		(penalty scored) Ch. Diabaté; (penalty scored) V. Ghafouri; (penalty scored) H. Milić; (penalty scored) A. Motahari
Note: 1. 93rd Tehran derby 2. The remainder of the competition, held in August 2020, will be played behind closed doors due to the COVID-19 pandemic in Iran.

==== Final ====
3 September 2020 Final	Esteghlal	2 – 3	Tractor	Mashhad
18:15 IRDT (UTC+04:30)	M. Ghayedi 51'; F. Esmaeili (yellow card) 88'; A. Motahari 79'	Report	M. Teymouri (yellow card) 7'; M. Khanzadeh 17'; A. Dejagah 34'; A. Imani (yellow card) 38'; A. Imani 41'; S. Ansari (yellow card) 53'; E. Hajsafi (yellow card) 90+2'	Stadium: Imam Reza Stadium; Attendance: 0 (NC); Referee: Mouood Bonyadifar
Note: The remainder of the competition, held in August 2020, will be played behind closed doors due to the COVID-19 pandemic in Iran.

=== AFC Champions League ===
==== Qualifying play-off ====
===== Preliminary =====
25 January 2020 Preliminary round	Esteghlal (Iran)	3 – 0	Al-Kuwait	Dubai, United Arab Emirates
18:20 UTC+4	M. Rigi (yellow card) 19'; Ch. Diabaté 27', 54'; V. Ghafouri 59'; A. Karimi (yellow card) 76'; Sh. Taherkhani (yellow card) 77'	Live Report; Stats Report	F. Hamoud (yellow card) 39'; A. Abbas (yellow card) 44'; Bismark (yellow card) 53'; Y. Al-Khobizi (yellow card) 63'	Stadium: Maktoum bin Rashid Al Maktoum Stadium; Referee: Nazmi Nasaruddin (Malaysia)

===== Play-off =====
28 January 2020 Play-off round	Al-Rayyan (Qatar)	0 – 5	(Iran) Esteghlal	Doha, Qatar
18:15 UTC+3	K. Muftah (yellow card) 56'; A. El-Sayed (yellow card) 57'; F. Younis (yellow card) 83'; A. Hatem (yellow card) 87'	Report	Ch. Diabaté 8'; M. Ghayedi 40', 47'; M. Daneshgar (yellow card) 83'; A. Motahari 84', 90+1'; A. Rezavand (yellow card) 87'	Stadium: Jassim bin Hamad Stadium; Referee: Minoru Tojo (Japan)

==== Group stage ====
Pos	Team	Pld	W	D	L	GF	GA	GD	Pts	Qualification	AHL	EST	SHO	WAH
1	(Saudi Arabia) Al-Ahli	4	2	0	2	4	6	−2	6	Advance to knockout stage	—	2–1	1–0	~~20 Sep~~
2	(Iran) Esteghlal	4	1	2	1	6	4	+2	5	Advance to knockout stage	3–0	—	1–1	~~17 Sep~~
3	(Iraq) Al-Shorta	4	1	2	1	4	4	0	5		2–1	1–1	—	~~0–1~~
4	(United Arab Emirates) Al-Wahda	0	0	0	0	0	0	0	0	Withdrew, results expunged (Note: Al-Wahda were unable to travel to Qatar to play the final four matches of the group stage due to several team members having tested positive for COVID-19. They were considered to have withdrawn from the competition, and their results were expunged.)	~~1–1~~	~~14 Sep~~	~~23 Sep~~	—

Source: AFC
Rules for classification: Tiebreakers
Notes:

10 February 2020 1	Al-Shorta (Iraq)	1 – 1	(Iran) Esteghlal	Erbil, Iraq
17:30 UTC+3	A. Faez 48' (pen.)	Live Report; Stats Report	A. Rezavand (yellow card) 4'; H. Kadhim 24' (o.g.)	Stadium: Franso Hariri Stadium; Referee: Ahmed Al-Ali (Jordan)

17 February 2020 2	Al-Ahli (Saudi Arabia)	2 – 1	(Iran) Esteghlal	Kuwait City, Kuwait
18:30 UTC+3	Al-Moasher 17' (pen.), 29'; M. Al-Majhad (yellow card) 27'; A. Al-Asmari (yellow card) 34'; A. Hindi (yellow card) 52'; Y. Belaïli (yellow card) 90+1'	Live Report; Stats Report	R. Cheshmi (yellow card) 1'; Motahari 22'	Stadium: Jaber Al-Ahmad International Stadium; Attendance: 6,740; Referee: Ko Hyung-jin (South Korea)
Note: Matches between teams from Iran and Saudi Arabia will be played on neutral venues due to deterioration of Iran–Saudi Arabia relations.

14 September 2020 3	Al-Wahda (United Arab Emirates)	Cancelled	(Iran) Esteghlal	Doha, Qatar
21:00 UTC+3		Live Report; Stats Report		Stadium: Khalifa International Stadium

17 September 2020 4	Esteghlal (Iran)	Cancelled	(United Arab Emirates) Al-Wahda	Doha, Qatar
21:00 UTC+3		Live Report; Stats Report		Stadium: Khalifa International Stadium

20 September 2020 5	Esteghlal (Iran)	1 – 1	(Iraq) Al-Shorta	Doha, Qatar
21:00 UTC+3	A. Rezavand (yellow card) 16'; H. Milić (yellow card) 32'; V. Ghafouri (yellow card) 36'; A. Motahari 68'	Live Report; Stats Report	M. Fayyadh 26'; M. Hussein (yellow card) 28'; S. Abdul-Amir (yellow card) 89'; S. Zamil (yellow card) 90+3'	Stadium: Khalifa International Stadium; Attendance: 0 Referee: Ko Hyung-jin (South Korea)

23 September 2020 6	Esteghlal (Iran)	3 – 0	(Saudi Arabia) Al-Ahli	Al Wakrah, Qatar
18:00 UTC+3	M. Ghayedi 29'; H. Milić (yellow card) 30'; A. Karimi 38'; Ch. Diabaté 54'	Live Report; Stats Report	H. Abdulghani (yellow card) 49'	Stadium: Al Janoub Stadium; Attendance: 0 Referee: Adham Makhadmeh (Jordan)

==== Knockout stage ====
===== Round of 16 =====
26 September 2020 Round of 16	Pakhtakor (Uzbekistan)	2 – 1	(Iran) Esteghlal	Al Wakrah, Qatar
20:45 UTC+3	E. Krimets (yellow card) 5'; D. Ćeran 43'; E. Derdiyok 47'; E. Suyunov (yellow card) 84'; F. Sayfiev (yellow card) 89'	Live Report; Stats Report	A. Motahari (yellow card) 4'; A. Karimi 32'; M. Daneshgar (yellow card) 74'; A. Rezavand (yellow card) 77'; M. Zakipour (yellow card) 87'; M. Ghayedi (yellow card) 90+2'	Stadium: Al Janoub Stadium; Attendance: 0 Referee: Ahmed Al-Kaf (Oman)

== Statistics ==
=== Squad statistics ===
No.	Pos	Nat	Player	Total		Pro League		Hazfi Cup		ACL	
No.	Pos	Nat	Player	Apps	Goals	Apps	Goals	Apps	Goals	Apps	Goals
1	GK	(Iran)	Hossein Hosseini	42	0	30	0	5	0	7	0
3	DF	(Iran)	Milad Zakipour	27	0	17	0	5	0	5	0
4	DF	(Iran)	Roozbeh Cheshmi	31	1	22	1	3	0	6	0
5	DF	(Iran)	Aref Gholami	29	1	21	1	5	0	3	0
6	MF	(Iran)	Ali Karimi	37	8	27	5	4	1	6	2
7	FW	(Mali)	Cheick Diabaté	28	19	21	15	2	0	5	4
8	MF	(Iran)	Farshid Esmaeili	29	3	22	2	4	1	3	0
9	FW	(Iran)	Ali Dashti	17	0	14	0	1	0	2	0
10	MF	(Iran)	Mehdi Ghayedi	41	15	30	10	5	2	6	3
11	FW	(Iran)	Morteza Tabrizi	16	0	11	0	2	0	3	0
14	MF	(Iran)	Farshid Bagheri	21	0	15	0	1	0	5	0
15	MF	(Iran)	Sina Khadempour	5	0	4	0	1	0	0	0
17	FW	(Iran)	Zakaria Moradi	5	0	2	0	0	0	3	0
21	DF	(Iran)	Vouria Ghafouri	39	8	29	5	4	2	6	1
22	DF	(Iran)	Siavash Yazdani	14	0	12	0	2	0	0	0
23	MF	(Iran)	Dariush Shojaeian	9	2	7	1	2	1	0	0
28	MF	(Iran)	Mohsen Karimi	4	0	4	0	0	0	0	0
32	DF	(Iran)	Amirhossein Kargar	1	0	1	0	0	0	0	0
33	DF	(Croatia)	Hrvoje Milić	30	2	22	2	4	0	4	0
40	MF	(Iran)	Amir Hossein Khodamoradi	7	0	6	0	1	0	0	0
41	DF	(Iran)	Arash Dajliri	2	0	2	0	0	0	0	0
42	MF	(Iran)	Fardin Rabet	1	0	1	0	0	0	0	0
57	DF	(Iran)	Shahin Taherkhani	11	0	6	0	0	0	5	0
66	MF	(Iran)	Masoud Rigi	38	1	26	1	5	0	7	0
70	DF	(Iran)	Mohammad Daneshgar	36	5	24	4	5	1	7	0
72	FW	(Iran)	Amir Arsalan Motahari	20	10	11	5	2	1	7	4
77	MF	(Iran)	Reza Azari	1	0	1	0	0	0	0	0
80	MF	(Iran)	Mohammad Bolboli	5	0	4	0	1	0	0	0
88	MF	(Iran)	Arash Rezavand	38	1	27	1	5	0	6	0
Players transferred/loaned out during the season
20	DF	(Bulgaria)	Nikolay Bodurov	3	0	1	0	0	0	2	0
99	FW	(Iran)	Sajjad Aghaei	7	3	5	1	2	2	0	0

Last updated: 29 September 2020
Source: Competitions

=== Goals ===
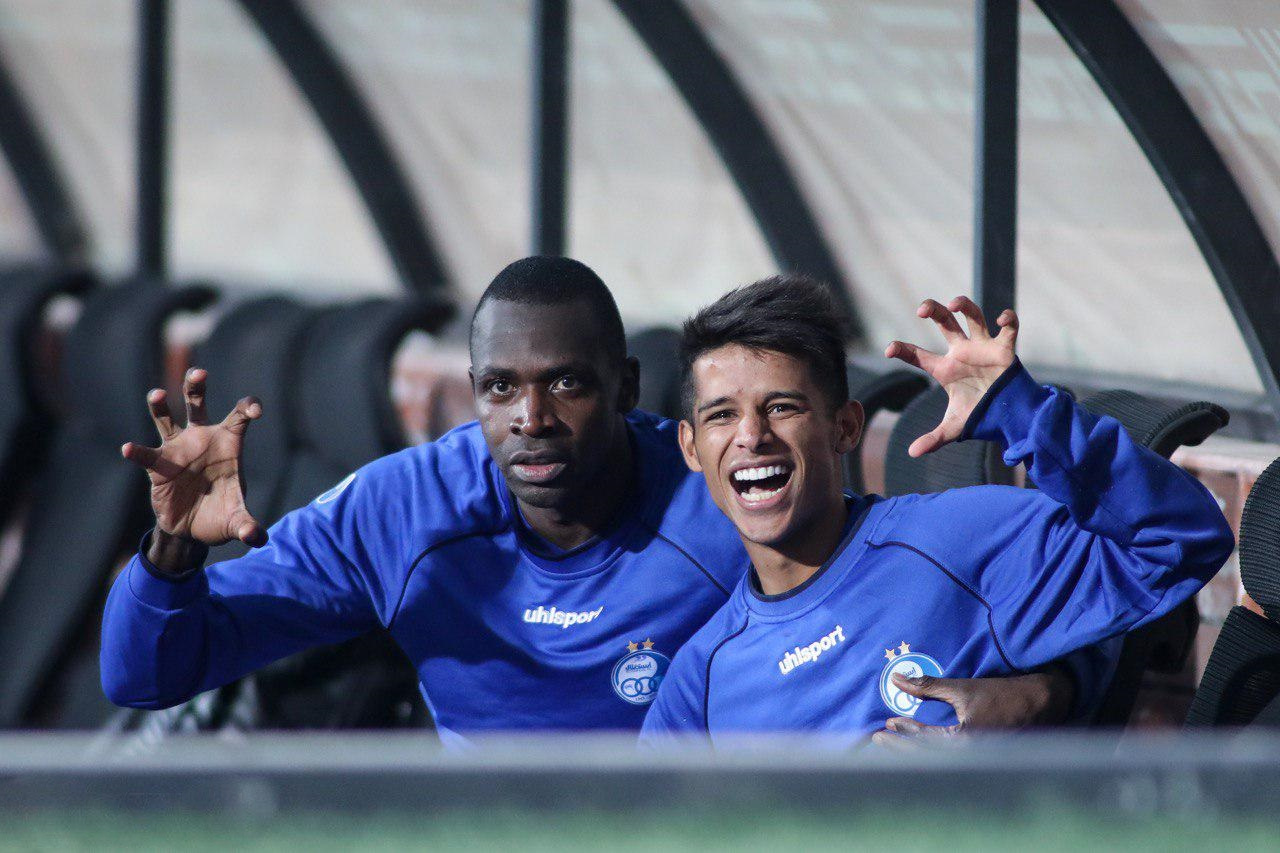
Cheick Diabaté and Mehdi Ghayedi are best scorers during the season

Rank	Player	Position	Pro League	Hazfi Cup	ACL	Total
1	Cheikh Diabaté	FW	15	0	4	19
2	Mehdi Ghayedi	FW	10	2	3	15
3	Amir Arsalan Motahari	FW	5	1	4	10
4	Voria Ghafouri	DF	5	2	1	8
4	Ali Karimi	MF	5	1	2	8
6	Mohammad Daneshgar	DF	4	1	0	5
7	Farshid Esmaeili	MF	2	1	0	3
7	Sajjad Aghaei	FW	1	2	0	3
9	Hrvoje Milić	DF	2	0	0	2
9	Dariush Shojaeian	FW	1	1	0	2
11	Aref Gholami	DF	1	0	0	1
11	Masoud Rigi	MF	1	0	0	1
11	Arash Rezavand	MF	1	0	0	1
11	Rouzbeh Cheshmi	DF	1	0	0	1
Own Goals			1	1	1	3
Total			55	12	15	82

=== Clean sheets ===
Rank	Name	Pro League	Hazfi Cup	ACL	Total
1	Hossein Hosseini	7	2	3	12
Total		7	2	3	12

=== Disciplinary record ===
N	P	Nat.	Name	Pro League			Hazfi Cup			AFC CL			Total			Notes
N	P	Nat.	Name	Yellow card	Second yellow card	Red card	Yellow card	Second yellow card	Red card	Yellow card	Second yellow card	Red card	Yellow card	Second yellow card	Red card	Notes
1	GK	(Iran)	Hossein Hosseini	1			2						3			
3	DF	(Iran)	Milad Zakipour	2						1			3			
4	DF	(Iran)	Roozbeh Cheshmi	2						1			3			
5	DF	(Iran)	Aref Gholami	3	1		1						4	1		
6	MF	(Iran)	Ali Karimi	3	1	1	1			1			5	1	1	
7	MF	(Mali)	Cheick Diabaté	4									4			
8	MF	(Iran)	Farshid Esmaeili	2	1		2						4	1		
9	MF	(Iran)	Ali Dashti	6			1						7			
10	FW	(Iran)	Mehdi Ghayedi	2						1			3			
11	FW	(Iran)	Morteza Tabrizi	2									2			
14	MF	(Iran)	Farshid Bagheri	1									1			
21	DF	(Iran)	Vouria Ghafouri	2						1			3			
23	MF	(Iran)	Dariush Shojaeian	2									2			
33	DF	(Croatia)	Hrvoje Milić	1						2			3			
57	DF	(Iran)	Shahin Taherkhani							1			1			
66	MF	(Iran)	Masoud Rigi	5			1			1			7			
70	DF	(Iran)	Mohammad Daneshgar	3		1	1			2			6		1	
72	FW	(Iran)	Amir Arsalan Motahari	1						1			2			
88	MF	(Iran)	Arash Rezavand	6	1					4			10	1		

Last updated: 29 September 2020
Source: Scoreway
Only competitive matches
(yellow card) = Number of bookings; (second yellow card) = Number of sending offs after a second yellow card; (red card) = Number of sending offs by a direct red card.
