= List of Iranian football transfers summer 2019 =

This is a list of Iranian football transfers for the 2019 summer transfer window. Only moves from Persian Gulf Pro League and Azadegan League are listed. The summer transfer window will begin on 5 June 2019 and closes at midnight on 28 August 2019. Players without a club may join at any time. This list includes transfers featuring at least one Iran Football League club which were completed after the end of the winter 2018–19 transfer window on 3 February and before the end of the 2019 summer window.

== Rules and regulations ==
According to Iran Football Federation rules for 2019–20 Persian Gulf Pro League, each Football Club is allowed to take up to maximum 6 new Iranian player from the other clubs who already played in the 2018–19 Persian Gulf Pro League season. In addition to these six new players, each club is allowed to take up to maximum 4 non-Iranian new players (at least one of them should be Asian) and up to 3 players from Free agent (who did not play in 2019–20 Persian Gulf Pro League season or doesn't list in any 2019–20 League after season's start) during the season. In addition to these players, the clubs are also able to take some new under-23 and under-21 years old players, if they have some free place in these categories in their player lists. Under-23 players should sign in transfer window but under-21 can be signed during the first mid-season. On 5 July 2018, a new rule was confirmed by Iran Football Federation which allows the clubs to move up to three players into their under-25 years old players list. These under-25 years old players must be under contract of the club in the previous season.

=== Players limits ===
The Iranian Football Clubs who participate in 2019–20 Iranian football different levels are allowed to have up to maximum 45 players in their player lists, which will be categorized in the following groups:

- Up to maximum 18 adult (without any age limit) players
- Up to maximum 3 under-25 players (i.e. the player whose birth is after 1 January 1995).
- Up to maximum 11 under-23 players (i.e. the player whose birth is after 1 January 1997).
- Up to maximum 15 under-21 players (i.e. the player whose birth is after 1 January 1999).

== Iran Pro League ==
=== Esteghlal ===
==== In ====
Date	Player	From	Type	Ref
23 June 2019	(Iran) Mohammad Bolboli	(Iran) Sepidrood	Transfer	
23 June 2019	(Iran) Ali Dashti	(Iran) Saipa	Transfer	
23 June 2019	(Iran) Milad Bagheri	(Iran) Mes Kerman	Transfer	
23 June 2019	(Iran) Siavash Yazdani	(Iran) Sepahan	Transfer	
23 June 2019	(Iran) Masoud Rigi	(Iran) Padideh	Transfer	
30 June 2019	(Iran) Sina Khadempour	(Iran) Gol Gohar	End of loan	
8 July 2019	(Iran) Arash Rezavand	(Iran) Saipa	Transfer	
9 July 2019	(Mali) Cheick Diabaté	(Turkey) Osmanlıspor	Transfer	
22 July 2019	(Iran) Aref Gholami	(Iran) Foolad	Transfer	
14 August 2019	(Iran) Hossein Pour Hamidi	(Iran) Esteghlal Khuzestan	Transfer	
19 August 2019	(Croatia) Hrvoje Milić	(Italy) Crotone	Transfer	

==== Out ====
Date	Player	To	Type	Ref
16 May 2019	(Iran) Khosro Heydari	Retired	End of contract	
16 June 2019	(Iran) Mehdi Rahmati	(Iran) Padideh	End of contract	
20 June 2019	(Iran) Arshia Babazadeh	(Thailand) Surat Thani	Transfer	
25 June 2019	(Iran) Farshad Mohammadi Mehr	(Iran) Padideh	Transfer	
26 June 2019	(Iran) Meysam Teymouri	(Iran) Tractor	Transfer	
30 June 2019	(South Africa) Ayanda Patosi	(South Africa) Cape Town	Loan return	
1 July 2019	(Iran) Allahyar Sayyadmanesh	(Turkey) Fenerbahçe	Transfer	
3 July 2019	(Iran) Omid Noorafkan	(Belgium) Charleroi	Loan return	
4 July 2019	(Iran) Amirhossein Esmaeilzadeh	(Iran) Pars Jonoubi	Transfer	
6 July 2019	(Iran) Reza Karimi	Unattached	Released	
11 July 2019	(Nigeria) Godwin Mensha	(United Arab Emirates) Ajman	Transfer	
14 July 2019	(Iran) Ahmadreza Ahmadvand	(Iran) Persepolis	Transfer	
22 July 2019	(Iran) Armin Sohrabian	(Iran) Saipa	Transfer	
22 July 2019	(Iran) Rouhollah Bagheri	(Iran) Padideh	Transfer	
3 August 2019	(Iraq) Humam Tariq	(Egypt) Ismaily	Transfer	
4 August 2019	(Iran) Pejman Montazeri	(Qatar) Al Kharitiyat	End of contract	
28 August 2019	(Iran) Mehdi Nourollahi	(Iran) Saipa	Transfer	
9 September 2019	(Guinea-Bissau) Esmaël Gonçalves	(Japan) Matsumoto Yamaga	Transfer	

=== Foolad ===
==== In ====
Date	Player	From	Type	Ref
28 May 2019	(Iran) Mohammad Bolboli	(Iran) Sepidrood	Transfer	
2 June 2019	(Iran) Shahab Gordan	(Iran) Sanat Naft	Transfer	

==== Out ====
Date	Player	To	Type	Ref
18 June 2019	(Iran) Reza Mirzaei	(Iran) Sepahan	Loan return	

=== Gol Gohar ===
==== In ====
Date	Player	From	Type	Ref

==== Out ====
Date	Player	To	Type	Ref
30 June 2019	(Iran) Sina Khadempour	(Iran) Esteghlal	Loan return	

=== Machine Sazi ===
==== In ====
Date	Player	From	Type	Ref

==== Out ====
Date	Player	To	Type	Ref
8 June 2019	(Iran) Saeid Mehri	(Iran) Machine Sazi	Transfer	

=== Naft Masjed-Soleyman ===
==== In ====
Date	Player	From	Type	Ref

==== Out ====
Date	Player	To	Type	Ref

=== Nassaji ===
==== In ====
Date	Player	From	Type	Ref
30 June 2019	(Iran) Hassan Jafari	(Iran) Sepahan	Released	
30 June 2019	(Iran) Reza Dehghani	(Iran) Sepahan	On loan	
1 July 2019	(Iran) Milad Sarlak	(Iran) Sepahan	End of contract	

==== Out ====
Date	Player	To	Type	Ref
12 June 2019	(Georgia (country)) Giorgi Gvelesiani	(Iran) Sepahan	Transfer	

=== Padideh ===
==== In ====
Date	Player	From	Type	Ref
16 June 2019	(Iran) Mehdi Rahmati	(Iran) Esteghlal	Transfer	

==== Out ====
Date	Player	To	Type	Ref
5 June 2019	(Iran) Morteza Mansouri	(Iran) Sepahan	Transfer	

=== Pars Jonoubi Jam ===
==== In ====
Date	Player	From	Type	Ref
10 June 2019	(Iran) Mohammad Ebrahimi	(Iran) Sepahan	End of Contract	

==== Out ====
Date	Player	To	Type	Ref

=== Paykan ===
==== In ====
Date	Player	From	Type	Ref
18 June 2019	(Iran) Jalaleddin Alimohammadi	(Iran) Sepahan	End of Contract	
2 July 2019	(Iran) Mehdi Amini	(Iran) Sepahan	Released	

==== Out ====
Date	Player	To	Type	Ref

=== In ===
No	P	Name	Age	Moving from	Ends	Transfer fee	Type	Transfer window	Quota	Source
37	MF	Hamidreza Taherkhani	20	Sepidrood Rasht	2021	—	Loan return	Summer		
22	GK	Sasan Zamaneh	20	Esteghlal	2024	—	Transfer	Summer		
10	MF	Farshad Ahmadzadeh	26	(Poland) Śląsk Wrocław	2022	—	Transfer	Summer		
6	DF	Hossein Kanaanizadegan	25	Machine Sazi	2021	—	Transfer	Summer		
19	MF	Vahid Amiri	31	(Turkey) Trabzonspor	2021	—	Transfer	Summer		
16	FW	Mehdi Abdi	20	Academy	2022	—	Promoted	Summer		
20	FW	Amir Roostaei	21	Paykan	2021	—	Transfer	Summer		
12	GK	Amir Hossein Bayat	21	Baadraan	2022	—	Transfer	Summer		

=== Out ===
No	P	Name	Age	Moving to	Transfer fee	Type	Transfer window	Source
19	CF	Mario Budimir	33	(Croatia) Lokomotiva	Free	Transfer	Summer	
7	MF	Soroush Rafiei	29	Unattached	Free	Released	Summer	
69	DF	Shayan Mosleh	26	Unattached	Free	Released	Summer	
37	MF	Hamidreza Taherkhani	20	Unattached	Free	Released	Summer	
10	FW	Mehdi Sharifi	26	Unattached	Free	Released	Summer	
12	GK	Abolfazl Darvishvand	22	Unattached	Free	Released	Summer	
77	FW	Saeid Karimi	19	Unattached	Free	Released	Summer	

=== Saipa ===
==== In ====
Date	Player	From	Type	Ref

==== Out ====
Date	Player	To	Type	Ref

=== Sanat Naft ===
==== In ====
Date	Player	From	Type	Ref

==== Out ====
Date	Player	To	Type	Ref
2 June 2019	(Iran) Shahab Gordan	(Iran) Foolad	Transfer	

=== Sepahan ===
==== In ====
Date	Player	From	Type	Ref
5 June 2019	(Iran) Morteza Mansouri	(Iran) Padideh	Transfer	
6 June 2019	(Iran) Mohammad Reza Hosseini	(Iran) Zob Ahan	Transfer	
8 June 2019	(Iran) Mohammad Mohebi^{U23}	(Iran) Shahin Bushehr	Transfer	
12 June 2019	(Georgia (country)) Giorgi Gvelesiani	(Iran) Nassaji	Transfer	
18 June 2019	(Iran) Reza Mirzaei	(Iran) Foolad Khuzestan	End of loan	
22 June 2019	(Iran) Abolfazl Akasheh^{U21}	(Iran) Arvand Khorramshahr	Transfer	
25 June 2019	(Iran) Alireza Naghizadeh	(Iran) Tractor	Transfer	
5 August 2019	(Iran) Shayan Mosleh	(Iran) Persepolis	Transfer	
19 August 2019	(Iran) Omid Noorafkan^{U23}	(Belgium) Charleroi	On loan	
28 August 2019	(Iran) Ali Babaei^{U21}	(Iran) Paykan U21	Transfer	

==== Out ====
Date	Player	To	Type	Ref
1 June 2019	(Iran) Mehrdad Mohammadi	(Portugal) Aves	End of Contract	
10 June 2019	(Iran) Mohammad Ebrahimi	(Iran) Pars Jonoubi	End of Contract	
11 June 2019	(Iran) Siavash Yazdani	(Iran) Esteghlal	End of Contract	
15 June 2019	(Iran) Mohammad Moslemipour^{U23}	(Iran) Machine Sazi	Transfer	
18 June 2019	(Iran) Jalaleddin Alimohammadi	(Iran) Paykan	End of Contract	
30 June 2019	(Iran) Hassan Jafari	(Iran) Nassaji	Released	
30 June 2019	(Iran) Reza Dehghani^{U23}	(Iran) Nassaji	On loan	
1 July 2019	(Iran) Milad Sarlak	(Iran) Nassaji	End of Contract	
2 July 2019	(Iran) Mehdi Amini	(Iran) Paykan	End of loan - Released	
12 July 2019	(Iran) Bakhtiar Rahmani	(Qatar) Al-Shamal	Released	
6 August 2019	(Iran) Mohammad Papi^{U23}	(Iran) Gol Reyhan	End of loan - On loan	
11 August 2019	(Iran) Davoud Rajabi^{U23}	(Iran) Baadraan	End of loan - On loan	
19 August 2019	(Iran) Mohammad Zeynali^{U23}	(Iran) Gol Gohar	From Navad Urmia - On loan	
28 August 2019	(Iran) Khaled Shafiei	Unattached	Released	
28 August 2019	(Iran) Iman Zakizadeh	Unattached	End of loan - Released	

=== Shahin Bushehr ===
==== In ====
Date	Player	From	Type	Ref

==== Out ====
Date	Player	To	Type	Ref

=== Tractor ===
==== In ====
Date	Player	From	Type	Ref
8 June 2019	(Iran) Rashid Mazaheri	(Iran) Zob Ahan	Transfer	
8 June 2019	(Iran) Mohammad Reza Khanzadeh	(Qatar) Al-Ahli	Transfer	
8 June 2019	(Iran) Saeid Mehri	(Iran) Machine Sazi	Transfer	
8 June 2019	(Iran) Mehdi Tikdari	(Iran) Mes Kerman	Transfer	
15 June 2019	(Iran) Mohammad Moslemipour	(Iran) Sepahan	Transfer	
20 June 2019	(Iran) Masih Zahedi	(Iran) Machine Sazi	Transfer	
26 June 2019	(Iran) Meysam Teymouri	(Iran) Esteghlal	Transfer	
9 July 2019	(Iran) Reza Shekari ^{U23}	(Russia) Rubin Kazan	Transfer	
21 July 2019	(Brazil) Mazola	(Brazil) São Bento	Transfer	
1 August 2019	(Iran) Reza Asadi	(Iran) Saipa	Transfer	
18 August 2019	(Peru) Willyan Mimbela	(Peru) Unión Comercio	Transfer	
22 August 2019	(France) Kévin Fortuné	(France) Troyes AC	Transfer	
31 August 2019	(Iran) Abolfazl Razzaghpour ^{U23}	(Iran) Paykan F.C.	Transfer	

==== Out ====
Date	Player	To	Type	Ref
29 May 2019	(Scotland) Lee Erwin	Unattached	Released	
2 June 2019	(Guinea) Kévin Constant	Unattached	Released	
8 June 2019	(Iran) Mohammad Tayyebi	Unattached	Released	
25 June 2019	(Iran) Alireza Naghizadeh	(Iran) Sepahan	Transfer	
1 July 2019	(Iran) Ali Abdollahzadeh	(Iran) Pars Jonoubi Jam	Transfer	
16 July 2019	(Republic of Ireland) Anthony Stokes	Unattached	Released	
22 July 2019	(Iran) Mehdi Mehdipour	(Iran) Zob Ahan	End of loan	
22 July 2019	(Iran) Danial Esmaeilifar	(Iran) Zob Ahan	End of loan	
22 July 2019	(Iran) Ehsan Pahlavan	(Iran) Zob Ahan	End of loan	
9 August 2019	(Iran) Mohammad Moslemipour	(Iran) Machine Sazi	Transfer	
17 August 2019	(Iran) Masih Zahedi	(Iran) Machine Sazi	Transfer	

=== Zob Ahan ===
==== In ====
Date	Player	From	Type	Ref

==== Out ====
Date	Player	To	Type	Ref
6 June 2019	(Iran) Mohammad Reza Hosseini	(Iran) Sepahan	Transfer	
8 June 2019	(Iran) Mohammad Rashid Mazaheri	(Iran) Tractor	Transfer	
