= Pouria Amini =

Iranian footballer

Pourya amini
Personal information
- Full name: Poorya Amini
- Date of birth: February 27, 1995 (age 31)
- Place of birth: Kermanshah, Iran
- Height: 1.81 m (5 ft 11 in)
- Position: Midfielder

Youth career
- 2014–2016: Esteghlal

Senior career*
Years	Team	Apps	(Gls)
2016–2017	Pars Jonoubi	2	(0)
2017–2018	Naft Tehran	15	(0)
2019–2020	Sh. Bandar Abbas	2	(0)

International career
2013	Iran U17	1	(0)
- * Club domestic league appearances and goals as of 1 November 2021

Poorya Amini (Persian: پوریا امینی; born February 27, 1995) is an Iranian footballer.

== Club career ==
=== Club Career Statistics ===
- Last Update: 1 August 2018

Club performance			League		Cup		Continental		Total	
Season	Club	League	Apps	Goals	Apps	Goals	Apps	Goals	Apps	Goals
Iran			League		Hazfi Cup		Asia		Total	
2016–17	Pars Jonoubi	Azadegan League	2	0	0	0	–	–	2	0
2017–18	Naft Tehran	Persian Gulf Pro League	15	0	1	0	–	–	16	0
Career total			17	0	1	0	0	0	18	0
