= Bagherpour =

Bagherpour is an Iranian surname. Notable people with the name include:

- Amirhossein Bagherpour (born 1997), Iranian footballer
- Delkash (Esmat Bagherpour Panbehzan; 1925–2004), Iranian singer and actress
- Soudabeh Bagherpour (born 1990), Iranian volleyball player
