= Abolfazl Mohammadhassani =

Iranian footballer

Personal information
- Full name: Abolfazl Mohammadhassani
- Date of birth: 17 October 1997 (age 29)
- Place of birth: Bushehr, Iran
- Height: 1.86 m (6 ft 1 in)
- Position: Forward

Team information
- Current team: Esteghlal
- Number: 97

Youth career
- 2014–2017: Pars Jonoubi

Senior career*
Years	Team	Apps	(Gls)
2017–2018	Esteghlal Khuzestan	4	(0)
2018–	Esteghlal	0	(0)
- * Club domestic league appearances and goals

Abolfazl Mohammadhassani (Persian: ابوالفضل محمدحسنی, born 17 October 1997) is an Iranian football forward, who currently plays for Esteghlal in the Persian Gulf Pro League.
