= Voria Ghafouri =

Iranian-footballer (born 1987)

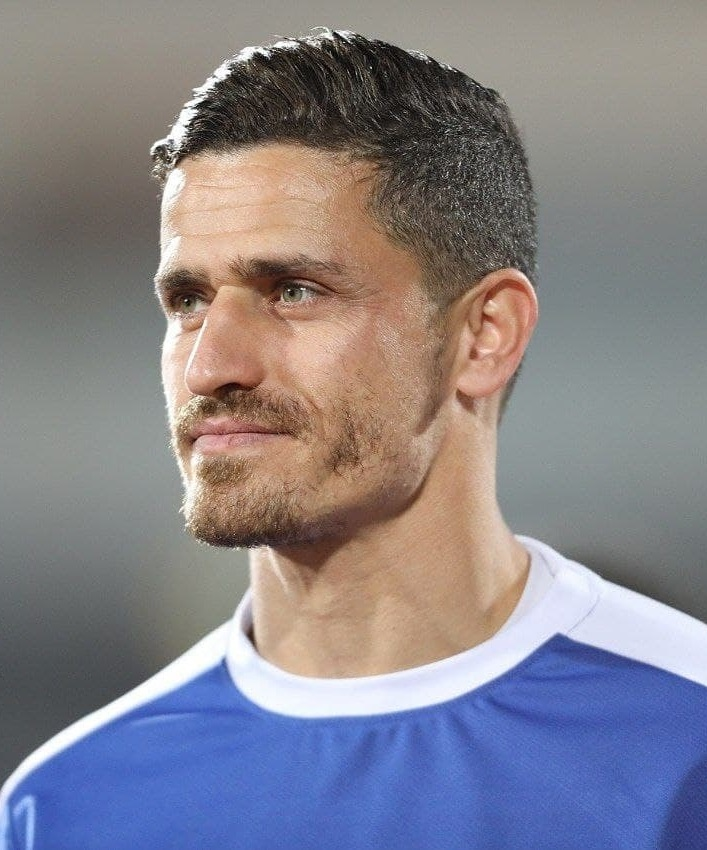
- Ghafouri in 2022

Personal information
- Date of birth: 19 November 1987 (age 38)
- Place of birth: Sanandaj, Iran
- Height: 1.78 m (5 ft 10 in)
- Positions: Right-back; right winger

Team information
- Current team: Esteghlal (assistant)

Youth career
- Pas Tehran

Senior career*
Years	Team	Apps	(Gls)
2007–2010	Pas Hamedan	81	(5)
2010–2012	Shahrdari Tabriz	50	(3)
2012–2014	Naft Tehran	62	(3)
2014–2016	Sepahan	45	(2)
2016–2022	Esteghlal	135	(19)
2022–2023	Foolad	12	(0)
Total		385	(32)

International career
2014–2019	Iran	28	(0)

Managerial career
- 2019: Esteghlal (caretaker player-manager)
- 2025–: Esteghlal (assistant–caretaker manager)
- * Club domestic league appearances and goals

Voria Ghafouri (Kurdish: وریا غەفووری, romanized: Wirya Xefûrî; Persian: وریا غفوری; born 19 November 1987) is an Iranian retired footballer. He has played much of his career as a right-back and also played as a right winger occasionally.

Before joining Esteghlal in 2016, Ghafouri spent a successful two-year spell with Sepahan, winning the Iranian League in 2015. Ghafouri debuted for Iran in 2014 against South Korea. He was part of Iran's squad in the 2015 and 2019 AFC Asian Cup.

During the 2022 World Cup, Voria Ghafouri was arrested for speaking publicly online against the violent repression of Iranian protesters. He is an activist for the civil rights of human rights and has repeatedly published his views.

== Club career ==
=== Early years ===
Ghafouri played his entire career for Pas Hamedan until 2010 when he signed with Shahrdari Tabriz. He later signed with Naft Tehran.

=== Sepahan ===
In July 2014 Ghafouri signed a two-year contract with Sepahan.

Ghafouri was named "Persian Gulf Pro League Defender of the year" by F.F.I.R.I. at the end of 2014–15 season.

=== Esteghlal ===
On 5 June 2016, he signed with Esteghlal on a two-year contract, reuniting him with his former manager at Naft Tehran, Alireza Mansourian. He announced on his Instagram account that he will wear number 21, the same number he used to wear in his previous teams.

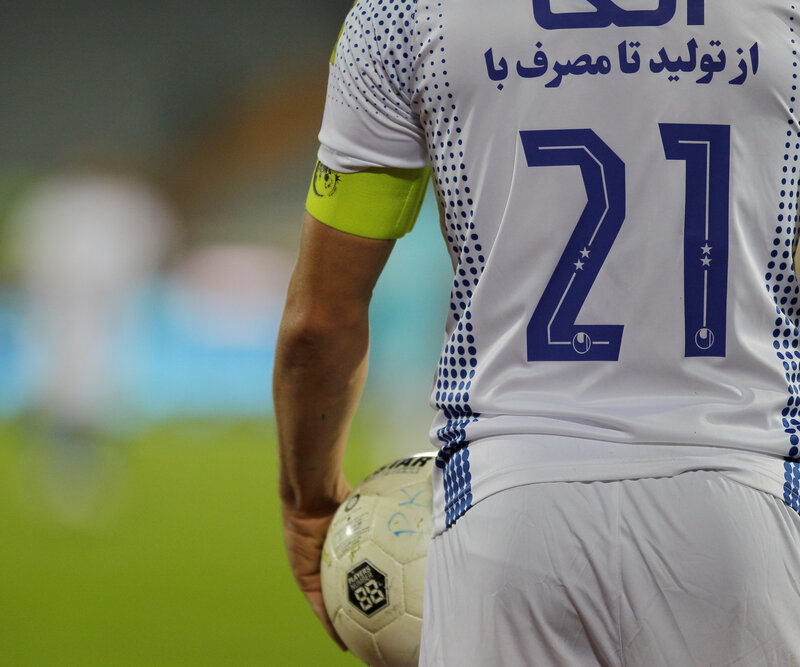
Ghafouri as Esteghlal captain in match against Paykan in 2019.

He made his debut for the club in a 1–1 draw against his former team, Naft Tehran. His first season with Esteghlal was a frustrating one for Ghafouri as he missed 13 matches in total due to various injuries which limited him to making just 17 appearances for the season in the league.

Ghafouri scored his first goal for Esteghlal in a 3–0 win against Esteghlal Khuzestan on 28 December 2017. On 1 March 2018, he scored Esteghlal's winning goal against Persepolis in the Tehran derby. His performance elected him as Man of the match. He was also named as the best right back in Football Tribe's Asia best eleven of the month for his display in March. On 2 April, Ghafouri scored his first AFC Champions League goal from the penalty spot in a 2–0 win against Al-Rayyan, securing qualification for the Round of 16 as Group D winners. He scored another goal in the following match against Al-Hilal and was named Man of the match for his performance. He finished his second season with 6 goals in 34 appearances in all competition as Esteghlal finished the season in third in the league, won the Hazfi Cup and qualified for the quarter-finals of Champions League.

In June 2018, Ghafouri signed a new contract keeping him at Esteghlal for another season. From the start of the 2018–19 season, Esteghlal's manager Winfried Schäfer, led to him being deployed in right-wing positions, a place where he'd occasionally played in his previous teams. On 2 August, he scored the first brace of his career in a 2–2 draw with Zob Ahan in Isfahan. On 26 November, he captained his side for the first time in a 0–1 defeat against his former team Sepahan.

On 2 June 2019, Ghafouri signed a contract extension that will keep him at the club until 2021. At the beginning of the 2019–20 campaign, following the departure of Esteghlal's captain Mehdi Rahmati, Andrea Stramaccioni made him the blues captain.

Esteghlal went on to win the 2021–22 Persian Gulf Pro League, becoming the first team in the league to go through the entire domestic league season unbeaten.

== International career ==
He was called up to Iran national football team in October 2014 by Carlos Queiroz. He made his debut in a 1–0 win against South Korea on 18 November 2014 entering as a substitute for Khosro Heydari.

Ghafouri was selected for the Iranian 2015 AFC Asian Cup squad on 30 December 2014 by Carlos Queiroz. Despite a successful group phase, where Iran won all their games with him featuring in all matches, Ghafouri did not achieve international glory as the team was beaten by Iraq in penalties which he successfully converted his turn in the first knockout stage of the tournament. Due to his performance in the tournament, he was voted as the surprise player of the tournament by the fans.

In May 2018 he was named in Iran's preliminary squad for the 2018 World Cup in Russia. however he did not make the final 23.

Ghafouri was named in the Iranian squad for 2019 AFC Asian Cup. After sitting out the first game against Yemen, he made his first appearance in the competition on 12 January and played the entire 2–0 win over Vietnam.

== Style of play ==
Known for his pace and great crosses. He is regarded as one of the best right-backs of Iran. He also is considered as a set-piece specialist as he takes most of the penalties and free-kicks.

== Activism ==
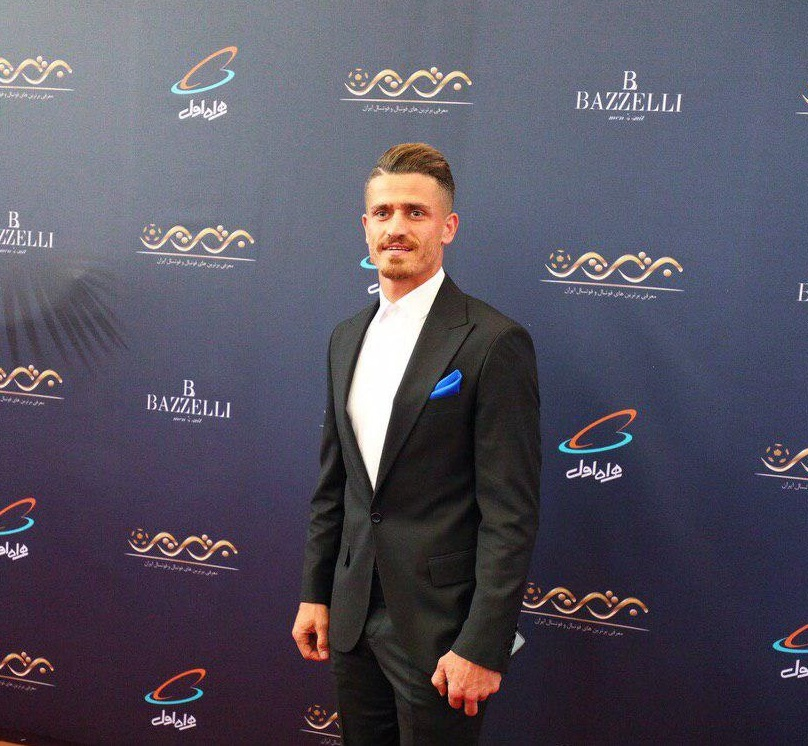
Ghafouri in 2019

Ghafouri regularly criticizes the general problems of society in Iran on his social media. In February 2019, after Mohammad Javad Zarif the Foreign Minister of Iran stated: "We are proud of being under pressure defending the people of Palestine, Lebanon, Yemen and Syria", Ghafouri posted a story on his Instagram account, criticizing him by saying: "You are not under pressure. As a matter of fact, it is the ordinary people who are under pressure." On 18 February, Iranian Supreme Leader Ayatollah Ali Khamenei stated: "Some people, who benefit from the country's peace and security enjoying their jobs and their favorite sports, bite the hand that feeds them" which was claimed to be referring to Ghafouri and fellow footballer Ali Karimi. A few hours after Khamenei's speech, he was summoned by the Ministry of Sport and Youth to give an explanation about his comments on Zarif. After being summoned, many fellow footballers supported him on their social media. During Esteghlal's next home game against Pars Jonoubi Jam, fans chanted his name at the 21-minute mark (as his shirt number is 21) to show their support to him.

Ghafouri has also repeatedly expressed support for the right of women to attend football matches in Iran. In 2019, he distributed blue jerseys in honor of the "Blue Girl" Sahar Khodayari, a woman who self-immolated after she was sentenced to prison for attempting to watch an Esteghal match at Azadi Stadium. Following another incident of violence against female football fans in 2021, Ghafouri wrote on Instagram "As a soccer player, I’ve indeed become humiliated when I play in an era when our mothers and sisters are prohibited from entering stadiums." In 2022 Iran lifted its 40-year ban on women's attendance at football stadiums. In appreciation for his support, during the first Esteghlal match open to women at Azadi Stadium on August 25, 2022, female fans reportedly shouted Ghafouri's name and "Voria, your words are the nation’s words."

In June 2022, Ghafouri announced Esteghlal owners had refused to renew his contract for the 2023 season, which many observers alleged was in retaliation to his outspoken criticism of the government.

On May 30, 2023, in an Instagram story, he announced his intention to retire from football, with his last match being between Esteghlal and Persepolis. Various sports, social, political, and artistic personalities responded to his farewell announcement with support and praise for the popular and social aspects of his personality. On the day of the match, his name was called many times by football fans and people thanked him for his social activities.

=== 2022 protests ===
In June 2022, Iranian Minister of Roads and Urban Development Rostam Ghasemi threatened Ghafouri accusing him of being a Kurdish separatist after he tweeted the word "Kurdistan" twice;, however, he denied the accusation later by stating that he would sacrifice his life for Iran.

On 24 November, Ghafouri was arrested by Iranian security forces after posting a call on social media for the government to end its violence against Kurds.

=== 2025-2026 protests ===
On 10 January, Ghafouri's restaurant, Cafe Varya, publicly supported the protests on its Instagram, stating that: "in solidarity with the dear people of Iran in protest against economic and livelihood pressures, it will be closed on Thursdays and Fridays." This led the Fars News Agency to call on a strong condemnation of this action from the Football Federation Islamic Republic of Iran and the Esteghal club, with the agency stating that they "must show that calling for chaos will have a strong response."

On 7 February 2026, Ghafouri was issued a travel and trade ban by the government for supporting the protests. In addition to prohibiting him from leaving the country, authorities also issued a warrant to seize his assets.

== Personal life ==
Born in Sanandaj, Kurdistan Province, Ghafouri is of Kurdish descent. Ghafouri and his wife Mona Ardalan have two children: son Radin and daughter Barin (born 2017). He cites Dani Alves and Frank Lampard as his favourite football players.

On 6 July 2020, Esteghlal announced Ghafouri and other 8 players have tested positive for COVID-19.

== Career statistics ==
=== Club ===
As of 30 May 2022

Appearances and goals by club, season and competition
Club	Season	League		Hazfi Cup		Asia		Total	
Club	Season	Apps	Goals	Apps	Goals	Apps	Goals	Apps	Goals
Pas Hamedan	2007–08	30	2			—		30	2
Pas Hamedan	2008–09	23	2			—		23	2
Pas Hamedan	2009–10	28	1	0	0	—		28	1
Pas Hamedan	Total	81	5	0	0	—		81	5
Shahrdari Tabriz	2010–11	20	1	1	1	—		21	2
Shahrdari Tabriz	2011–12	30	2	1	0	—		31	2
Shahrdari Tabriz	Total	50	3	2	1	—		52	4
Naft Tehran	2012–13	32	0	0	0	—		32	0
Naft Tehran	2013–14	30	3	1	0	—		31	3
Naft Tehran	Total	62	3	1	0	—		63	3
Sepahan	2014–15	27	2	1	0	—		28	2
Sepahan	2015–16	18	0	2	2	3	0	23	2
Sepahan	Total	45	2	3	2	3	0	51	4
Esteghlal	2016–17	17	0	0	0	6	0	23	0
Esteghlal	2017–18	24	4	4	0	10	2	38	6
Esteghlal	2018–19	23	4	1	0	5	0	29	4
Esteghlal	2019–20	29	5	4	2	6	1	39	8
Esteghlal	2020–21	22	6	5	2	7	0	34	8
Esteghlal	2021–22	20	0	2	0	—		22	0
Esteghlal	Total	135	19	16	4	34	3	185	26
Career total		373	32	22	7	37	3	432	42

=== International ===
As of 6 June 2019

Iran
Year	Apps	Goals
2014	1	0
2015	12	0
2016	0	0
2017	5	0
2018	7	0
2019	3	0
Total	28	0

== Honours ==
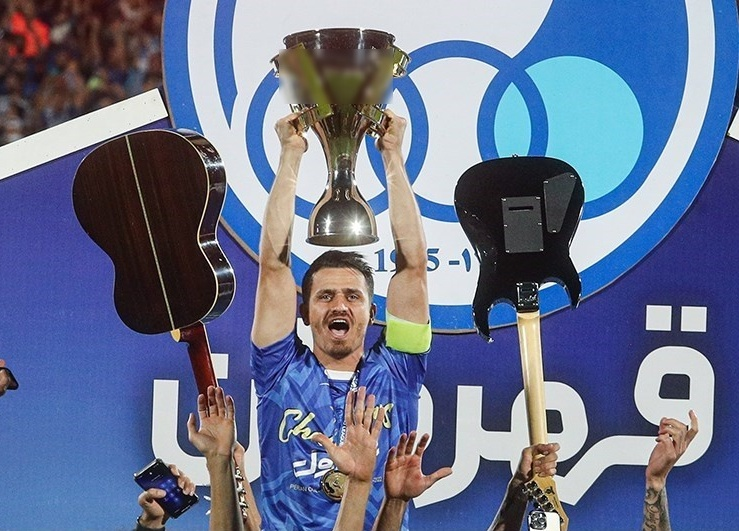
Voria celebrating IPL title with Esteghlal in 2022

Sepahan

- Iran Pro League: 2014–15

Esteghlal

- Iran Pro League: 2021–22
- Hazfi Cup: 2017–18

Individual

- Persian Gulf Pro League Defender of the Year: 2015
- Persian Gulf Pro League Team of the Year: 2014–15, 2017–18
- Navad Player of the Month: February 2018, March 2018
- AFC Champions League Best Right Back: 2019
