= Arash Dajliri =

Iranian footballer

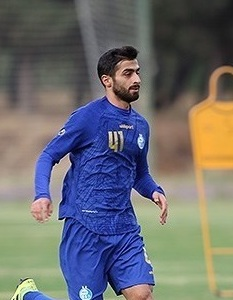

Personal information
- Full name: Arash Dajliri
- Date of birth: January 19, 1999 (age 27)
- Place of birth: Tonekabon, Iran
- Height: 1.85 m (6 ft 1 in)
- Positions: Right-back; center-back

Team information
- Current team: Esteghlal Mollasani F.C.
- Number: 41

Youth career
- 2015–2020: Esteghlal

Senior career*
Years	Team	Apps	(Gls)
2020–2022	Esteghlal	5	(0)
2021–2022	→ Havadar (loan)	8	(0)
2023–2023	Naft Gachsaran	10	(0)
2023–	Esteghlal Mollasani F.C.	4	(0)
- * Club domestic league appearances and goals as of 25 september 2023 ‡ National team caps and goals as of October 1, 2023

Arash Dajliri (Persian: آرش داجلیری; born January 19, 1999, in Tonekabon) is an Iranian footballer who plays as a right-back and center-back for Iranian club Esteghlal Mollasani F.C.

== Club career ==
=== Esteghlal ===
He made his debut for Esteghlal in 25th fixtures of 2019–20 Persian Gulf Pro League against Sanat Naft while he substituted in for Vouria Ghafouri.

=== Havadar ===
On 30 September 2021, Arash Dajliri moved to Havadar on loan from Esteghlal.

=== Naft Gachsaran ===
On 2023 Arash Dajliri moved to Naft Ghaemshahr F.C. and become champion of League 2 (Iran) with this club.

=== Esteghlal Mollasani ===
He joined Esteghlal Mollasani F.C. in Azadegan League in season of 2023–2024.
