= 2016–17 Sepahan F.C. season =

Sepahan
2016–17 season
- Chairman: Mohsen Taheri
- Manager: (Croatia) Zlatko Kranjčar (Iran) Abdollah Veisi
- Stadium: Foolad Shahr Stadium; Naghsh-e Jahan Stadium
- 16th Persian Gulf: 5st
- 30th Hazfi Cup: Semi-Final
- Top goalscorer: Ehsan Hajsafi
- Highest home attendance: 40,000; Sepahan-Esteghlal (Pro League, 25 DEC 2016)
- Lowest home attendance: 900; Sepahan-Siah Jamegan (Pro League, 21 OCT 2016)
- Average home league attendance: 8,000
Home colours	Away colours	Third colours

The 2016–17 season was Sepahan's 16th season in the Pro League, and their 23rd consecutive season in the top division of Iranian Football and 63rd year in existence as a football club. They competed in the Hazfi Cup. Sepahan was captained by Hossein Papi.

== Players ==
=== First-team squad ===
Note: Flags indicate national team as defined under FIFA eligibility rules; some limited exceptions apply. Players may hold more than one non-FIFA nationality.

No.	Pos.	Nation	Player
1	GK	BRA	Lee Oliveira
3	DF	IRI	Shoja' Khalilzadeh
5	DF	MLI	Moussa Coulibaly
6	MF	IRI	Milad Sarlak^{U23}
7	DF	IRI	Hossein Papi (Captain)
8	MF	IRI	Rasoul Navidkia
9	MF	IRI	Farid Karimi
10	FW	IRI	Taleb Reykani
12	FW	IRI	Reza Dehghani ^{U21}
14	FW	IRI	Masoud Hassanzadeh
15	FW	IRI	Mehdi Alimoradi
17	MF	IRI	Jalaleddin Alimohammadi
18	MF	IRI	Naser Ghalavand
19	MF	IRI	Saber Didehvar
20	FW	IRI	Masoud Kazemini

No.	Pos.	Nation	Player
21	MF	IRI	Mahmoud Ghaed Rahmati
22	GK	IRI	Farid Nejat
23	MF	IRI	Mehrdad Mohammadi
26	DF	IRI	Ali Ahmadi
27	GK	IRI	Mehdi Amini^{U23}
28	DF	IRI	Ehsan Hajisafi (Captain)
33	DF	IRI	Armin Sohrabian
37	MF	IRI	Hossein Fazeli
39	DF	IRI	Mohammad Roshandel
47	DF	IRI	Hadi Aghili
55	DF	IRI	Aref Gholami ^{U21}
70	MF	IRI	Hamed Bahiraei ^{U21}
77	DF	IRI	Reza Mirzaei ^{U21}
80	MF	UZB	Server Djeparov
88	DF	IRI	Jalal Abdi

- [U21 = Under 21 year player | U23 = Under 23 year player| U25 = Under 25 year player]

=== Current managerial staff ===
Position	Name
Manager	(Iran) Abdollah Veisi (end of 17 march 2017) (Croatia) Zlatko Kranjčar
First team coach	(Iran) Karim Ghanbari
Assistant coach	(Iran) Mahmoud Karimi
Goalkeepers coach	(Croatia) Tonci Mrduljas
Fitness trainer	(Brazil) Rafael Fogageiro
Doctor	(Iran) Mohammad Rashadi
Doctor assistant	(Iran) Asghar Majidikia
Physiotherapist	(Iran) Hamid Sedighi
Masseurs	(Iran) Ali Mousavi
Administrative manager	(Iran) Reza Fatahi
Executive manager	(Iran) Reza Fatahi

== Matches ==
Competition	First match	Last match	Starting round	Record							
Competition	First match	Last match	Starting round	Pld	W	D	L	GF	GA	GD	Win %
Pro League	26 July 2016	04 may 2017	Results	30	12	9	9	38	34	+4	40.00
Hazfi Cup	29 September 2016	30 December 2016		5	4	0	1	9	2	+7	80.00
Total				35	16	9	10	47	36	+11	45.71

Last updated: 31 August 2018.
Source: Competitions

=== Pro league ===
==== League table ====
Pos	Team	Pld	W	D	L	GF	GA	GD	Pts	Qualification or relegation
3	Tractor Sazi	30	15	11	4	38	24	+14	56	Qualification for the 2018 AFC Champions League group stage
4	Zob Ahan	30	12	10	8	39	30	+9	46	Qualification for the 2018 AFC Champions League qualifying play-offs
5	Sepahan	30	12	9	9	38	34	+4	45	
6	Paykan	30	12	8	10	39	38	+1	44	
7	Est. Khuzestan	30	10	11	9	36	34	+2	41	

Updated to match(es) played on 4 May 2017. Source: IPL Stats, Soccerway
Rules for classification: 1) Points; 2) Goal difference; 3) Goals scored.

==== Results summary ====
Overall								Home						Away					
Pld	W	D	L	GF	GA	GD	Pts	W	D	L	GF	GA	GD	W	D	L	GF	GA	GD
30	14	9	7	41	31	+10	51	8	4	3	23	16	+7	6	5	4	18	15	+3

Last updated: 31 August 2018.

==== Results by round ====
Round	1	2	3	4	5	6	7	8	9	10	11	12	13	14	15	16	17	18	19	20	21	22	23	24	25	26	27	28	29	30
Ground	H	A	H	A	H	A	H	A	H	A	H	A	A	H	A	A	H	A	H	A	H	A	H	A	H	A	A	H	A	H
Result	L	W	W	L	D	W	L	L	W	D	D	L	W	W	D	D	W	D	D	L	L	L	W	D	W	D	W	W	W	L
Position	15	6	2	4	6	3	4	9	6	6	7	10	8	8	8	7	4	5	5	6	9	10	8	7	5	5	5	5	4	5

Source: flashscores.co.uk
A = Away; H = Home; W = Win; D = Draw; L = Loss
