= Zakaria Moradi =

Iranian footballer

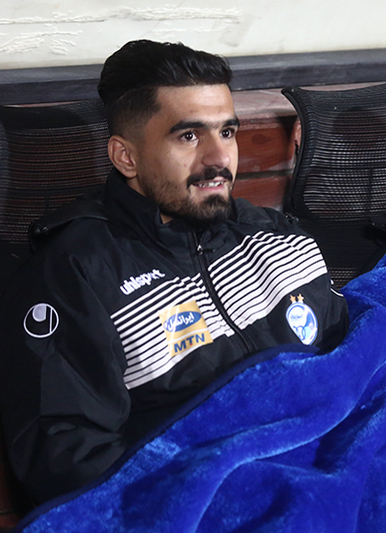

Personal information
- Full name: Zakaria Moradi
- Date of birth: June 14, 1998 (age 28)
- Place of birth: Karaj, Iran
- Height: 1.78 m (5 ft 10 in)
- Position: Winger

Team information
- Current team: Chooka Talesh
- Number: 37

Youth career
- 2015–2016: Fajr Tehran
- 2016: Tahran Mobaddel
- 2017–2018: Aboumoslem Tehran
- 2018–2019: Esteghlal

Senior career*
Years	Team	Apps	(Gls)
2019–2022	Esteghlal	2	(0)
2020–2022	→ Malavan (loan)	10	(0)
2022–	Chooka Talesh	0	(0)
- * Club domestic league appearances and goals as of 3 July 2022

Zakaria Moradi (Persian: زکریا مرادی; born June 14, 1998) is an Iranian football player who played as a winger for Iranian club Chooka Talesh in the Azadegan League.

== Club career ==
=== Esteghlal ===
He made his debut for Esteghlal in 15th fixtures of 2019–20 Iran Pro League against Shahin Bushehr while he substituted in for Hrvoje Milić.
