= Mohammad Dehghan Nejad =

Iranian footballer

Personal information
- Full name: Mohammad Dehghan Nejad
- Date of birth: July 19, 2000 (age 26)
- Place of birth: Iran
- Height: 1.86 m (6 ft 1 in)
- Position: Winger

Team information
- Current team: Naft Masjed Soleyman
- Number: 19

Youth career
- 2015–2016: Esteghlal
- 2016–2017: Badran
- 2017–2018: Ehsan Rey
- 2018–2019: Foolad Mahan
- 2019: Saipa
- 2019–2020: Esteghlal
- 2020–2021: Persepolis

Senior career*
Years	Team	Apps	(Gls)
2021–	Naft Masjed Soleyman	2	(0)
- * Club domestic league appearances and goals as of 30 September 2021

Mohammad Dehghan Nejad (Persian: محمد دهقان نژاد; born July 19, 2000) is an Iranian footballer who plays as a winger for Iranian club Naft Masjed Soleyman in the Persian Gulf Pro League.

== Club career ==
=== Naft Masjed Soleyman ===
On 5 October 2021, Mohebi moved to Naft Masjed Soleyman. He made his debut for Naft Masjed Soleyman in 2nd fixtures of 2021–22 Persian Gulf Pro League against Sepahan while he substituted in for Sina Khadempour.
