= Amirhossein Esmaeilzadeh =

Iranian footballer (born 2000)

Personal information
- Full name: Amirhossein Esmaeilzadeh
- Date of birth: 25 January 2000 (age 26)
- Place of birth: Amol, Iran
- Height: 1.80 m (5 ft 11 in)
- Position: Defender

Team information
- Current team: Nassaji Mazandaran
- Number: 19

Youth career
- 2016–2018: Paykan
- 2018–2019: Esteghlal

Senior career*
Years	Team	Apps	(Gls)
2018–2019	Esteghlal	0	(0)
2019–2020	Pars Jonoubi	4	(0)
2020–2021	Nassaji Mazandaran	0	(0)

International career^{‡}
2017	Iran U17	14	(0)
- * Club domestic league appearances and goals as of 24 May 2021 ‡ National team caps and goals as of 24 December 2021

Amirhossein Esmaeilzadeh (Persian: امیرحسین اسماعیل زاده; born January 25, 2000) is an Iranian footballer who plays for Nassaji Mazandaran in the Persian Gulf Pro League.

== Club career ==
=== Pars Jonoubi ===
He made his debut for Pars Jonoubi in 11th fixture of 2019–20 Persian Gulf Pro League against Paykan while he substituted in for Pouria Aria Kia.
