= Ali Gholami =

Iranian footballer

Personal information
- Date of birth: 5 September 1995 (age 31)
- Place of birth: Gorgan, Iran
- Position: Defender

Team information
- Current team: Sepahan

Youth career
- 2012–2015: Sepahan

Senior career*
Years	Team	Apps	(Gls)
2014–2016	Sepahan	1	(0)

International career
2012–2014	Iran U20	8	(1)
- * Club domestic league appearances and goals as of 17 May 2016

Ali Gholami (born 5 September 1995) is an Iranian footballer who played as a centre-back for Sepahan in the Iran Pro League.

His younger brother Aref Gholami is also a footballer.

== Club career statistics ==
- Last Update:17 May 2016

Club performance			League		Cup		Continental		Total	
Season	Club	League	Apps	Goals	Apps	Goals	Apps	Goals	Apps	Goals
Iran			League		Hazfi Cup		Asia		Total	
2015–16	Sepahan	Iran Pro League	1	0	0	0	0	0	1	0
Career total			1	0	0	0	0	0	1	0
