= Fariborz Gerami =

Iranian footballer (born 1993)

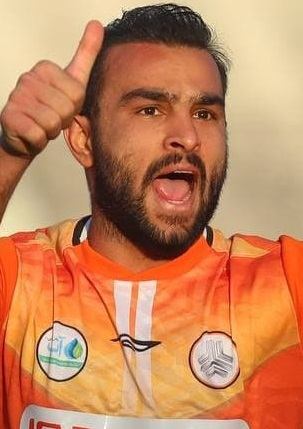

Personal information
- Date of birth: 3 May 1993 (age 33)
- Place of birth: Sari, Iran
- Height: 1.82 m (6 ft 0 in)
- Position: Centre back

Team information
- Current team: Mes Shahr-e Babak
- Number: 4

Youth career
- –2010: Steel Azin

Senior career*
| Years | Team | Apps | (Gls) |
| 2010–2013 | Steel Azin | | |
| 2013–2014 | Padideh | 9 | (0) |
| 2014–2015 | Nassaji | 11 | (1) |
| 2015–2018 | Padideh | 16 | (2) |
| 2018–2020 | Pars Jonoubi | 32 | (4) |
| 2020–2021 | Saipa | 15 | (1) |
| 2021–2024 | Havadar | 48 | (1) |
| 2024–2025 | Zob Ahan | 31 | (3) |
| 2025–2026 | Paykan | 6 | (0) |
| 2026– | Mes Shahr-e Babak | 10 | (1) |
- * Club domestic league appearances and goals as of 28 February 2025

Fariborz Gerami (Persian: فریبرز گرامی, born 3 May 1993) is an Iranian football Defender who plays for Mes Shahr-e Babak.
