= Mohammad Khorram =

Iranian footballer

Personal information
- Full name: Seyed Mohammad Khorramalhosseini
- Date of birth: 7 April 1997 (age 29)
- Place of birth: Qazvin, Iran
- Height: 1.74 m (5 ft 9 in)
- Position: Midfielder

Team information
- Current team: Pars Jonoubi Jam
- Number: 48

Youth career
- 2015–2017: Moghavemat Tehran

Senior career*
Years	Team	Apps	(Gls)
2017–2018	Gostaresh Foulad	8	(0)
2018–2020	Machine Sazi	44	(1)
2020–2022	Tractor	8	(0)
2022–2023	Naft Masjed Soleyman	33	(0)
2023–2024	Damash Gilan	10	(0)
2024	Khooshe Talaee	8	(0)
2024–	Pars Jonoubi Jam	7	(0)

International career^{‡}
2014	Iran U17	1	(0)
2015	Iran U20	2	(1)
2019	Iran U23	2	(0)
- * Club domestic league appearances and goals as of 21 April 2025 ‡ National team caps and goals as of 14 October 2019

Seyed Mohammad Khorramalhosseini, known as Mohammad Khorram (Persian: سیدمحمد خرم الحسینی; born 7 April 1997) is an Iranian football player who plays as midfielder for the Azadegan League club Pars Jonoubi Jam.
