= Parsa Jafari =

Iranian footballer

Personal information
- Date of birth: 9 July 1999 (age 27)
- Place of birth: Mashhad، Iran
- Height: 1.91 m (6 ft 3 in)
- Position: Goalkeeper

Team information
- Current team: Tractor
- Number: 81

Youth career
- 2018–2020: Esteghlal

Senior career*
Years	Team	Apps	(Gls)
2020–2021	Saipa	0	(0)
2021–2026	Zob Ahan	59	(0)
2026–	Tractor	0	(0)

International career
2022–2023	Iran U23	5	(0)
- * Club domestic league appearances and goals

Parsa Jafari (Persian: پارسا جعفری; born 9 July 1999) is an Iranian footballer who plays as a goalkeeper for Persian Gulf Pro League side Tractor.

== Career statistics ==
=== Club ===
Club	Season	League			Cup		Continental		Total	
Club	Season	League	Apps	Goals	Apps	Goals	Apps	Goals	Apps	Goals
Zob Ahan	2021-22	Persian Gulf Pro League	5	0	1	0	0	0	6	0
Zob Ahan	2022-23	Persian Gulf Pro League	6	0	1	0	0	0	7	0
Zob Ahan	2023-24	Persian Gulf Pro League	11	0	2	0	0	0	13	0
Career Total			22	0	4	0	0	0	26	0
