= Atabak Zarei =

Footballer

Personal information
- Date of birth: 5 March 1997 (age 29)
- Place of birth: Tabriz, Iran
- Height: 1.77 m (5 ft 10 in)
- Position: Midfielder

Team information
- Current team: Mes Kernan
- Number: 80

Youth career
- 2010–2015: Shahrdari Tabriz

Senior career*
Years	Team	Apps	(Gls)
2015–2017	Machine Sazi	14	(0)
2017–2018	Gostaresh Foulad	0	(0)
2018–2019	Shahrdari Tabriz	9	(1)
2019–2021	Machine Sazi	44	(2)
2021–2022	Fajr Sepasi	17	(0)
2022–2023	Mes Soongoun		
2023–2025	Chadormalou	25	(1)
2025–	Mes Kernan	13	(0)
- * Club domestic league appearances and goals as of 29 April 2025

Atabak Zarei (Persian: اتابك زارعي; born 5 March 1997) is an Iranian footballer who plays for Mes Kernan in the Azadegan League.
