= Milad Bagheri =

Iranian football defender

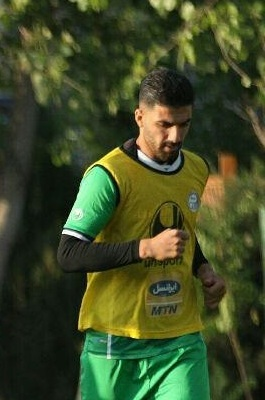

Personal information
- Date of birth: 11 November 1994 (age 31)
- Place of birth: Tehran, Iran
- Height: 1.86 m (6 ft 1 in)
- Position: Center back

Team information
- Current team: Paykan
- Number: 5

Youth career
- 2014–2015: Peykan

Senior career*
Years	Team	Apps	(Gls)
2015–2016	Kimia Farayand	20	(1)
2016	Haf Semnan	10	(0)
2016–2017	Pars Jonoubi	3	(0)
2017–2019	Mes Kerman	55	(3)
2019–2020	Esteghlal	0	(0)
2020	Pars Jonoubi	7	(0)
2020–2021	Gol Gohar	0	(0)
2021–2023	Naft Masjed Soleyman	21	(1)
2023	Shams Azar	10	(0)
2023–2025	Malavan	42	(2)
2025–	Paykan	26	(0)
- * Club domestic league appearances and goals as of 18 April 2025

Milad Bagheri (Persian: میلاد باقری; born 11 November 1994 is an Iranian football defender who plays for Paykan in the Persian Gulf Pro League.

Bagheri joined Sanat Mes Kerman after the excellent performance in the League 2 (Iran) with the Kimia Farayand and then the Azadegan League with the Pars Jonoubi.

After canceling the deal with Esteghlal, he returned to his former Pars Jonoubi team in the winter of 2020.

== Career statistics ==
=== Club ===
Club	Season	League			Cup		Continental		Total	
Club	Season	League	Apps	Goals	Apps	Goals	Apps	Goals	Apps	Goals
Pars Jonoubi	2016-17	Azadegan League	3	0	1	0	0	0	4	0
Mes	2017-18	Azadegan League	28	1	0	0	0	0	28	1
Mes	2018-19	Azadegan League	26	1	2	0	0	0	28	1
Mes	Total		54	2	2	0	0	0	56	2
Pars Jonoubi	2019-20	Persian Gulf Pro League	7	0	0	0	0	0	7	0
Naft MIS	2021-22	Persian Gulf Pro League	10	0	1	0	0	0	11	0
Naft MIS	2022-23	Persian Gulf Pro League	11	1	0	0	0	0	11	1
Naft MIS	Total		21	1	1	0	0	0	22	1
Shams Azar F.C.	2022-23	Azadegan League	10	0	0	0	0	0	10	0
Malavan	2023-24	Persian Gulf Pro League	20	1	2	0	0	0	22	1
Career Total			115	4	6	0	0	0	121	4

== Club career ==
=== Pars Jonoubi jam ===
In the 2016 transfer season, he joined the Pars Jonoubi jam team and was separated from the team after a season in the team.

=== Sanat Mes Kerman ===
In the transfer season of 2017, he joined the Sanat Mes of Kerman and after two seasons in the team and play in the game against Sepahan in the 2018 Cup, he separated from the team and joined the Esteghlal of Tehran.

=== Esteghlal Tehran ===
In 2019 transfer season, he joined the Esteghlal of Tehran with a three-year contract.

=== Pars Jonoubi jam ===
In the winter of 2020, he signed a new contract with his former team, terminating his previous contract.
