= Hossein Pouramini =

Iranian footballer

Personal information
- Date of birth: 27 November 1990 (age 35)
- Place of birth: Borazjan, Iran
- Height: 1.79 m (5 ft 10 in)
- Position: Midfielder

Team information
- Current team: Pars Jonoubi Jam
- Number: 11

Youth career
- –2010: Shahin Bushehr

Senior career*
Years	Team	Apps	(Gls)
2010–2011	Persepolis Borazjan		
2011–2015	Iranjavan		
2015–2016	Mes Rafsanjan	33	(0)
2016–2019	Pars Jonoubi Jam	84	(4)
2019–2022	Paykan	59	(2)
2022	Mes Rafsanjan	10	(0)
2022–2023	Sanat Naft	6	(0)
2023	Iranjavan		
2023–2024	Shahrdari Astara	5	(0)
2024–	Pars Jonoubi Jam	27	(0)
- * Club domestic league appearances and goals as of 21 April 2025

Hossein Pouramini (Persian: حسین پورامینی; born 27 November 1990) is an Iranian football midfielder who plays for Pars Jonoubi Jam in the Azadegan League.

== Club career statistics ==
As of 1 June 2018.

Club	Division	Season	League		Hazfi Cup		Asia		Total	
Club	Division	Season	Apps	Goals	Apps	Goals	Apps	Goals	Apps	Goals
Iranjavan	Division 1	2014–15	4	0	0	0	–	–	4	0
Mes Rafsanjan	Division 1	2015–16	33	0	0	0	–	–	33	0
Pars Jonoubi	Division 1	2016–17	27	0	1	0	–	–	28	0
Pars Jonoubi	Iran Pro League	2017–18	27	3	1	0	0	0	28	3
Career Totals			91	3	2	0	0	0	93	3
