= Ali Tari =

Iranian footballer (born 2001)

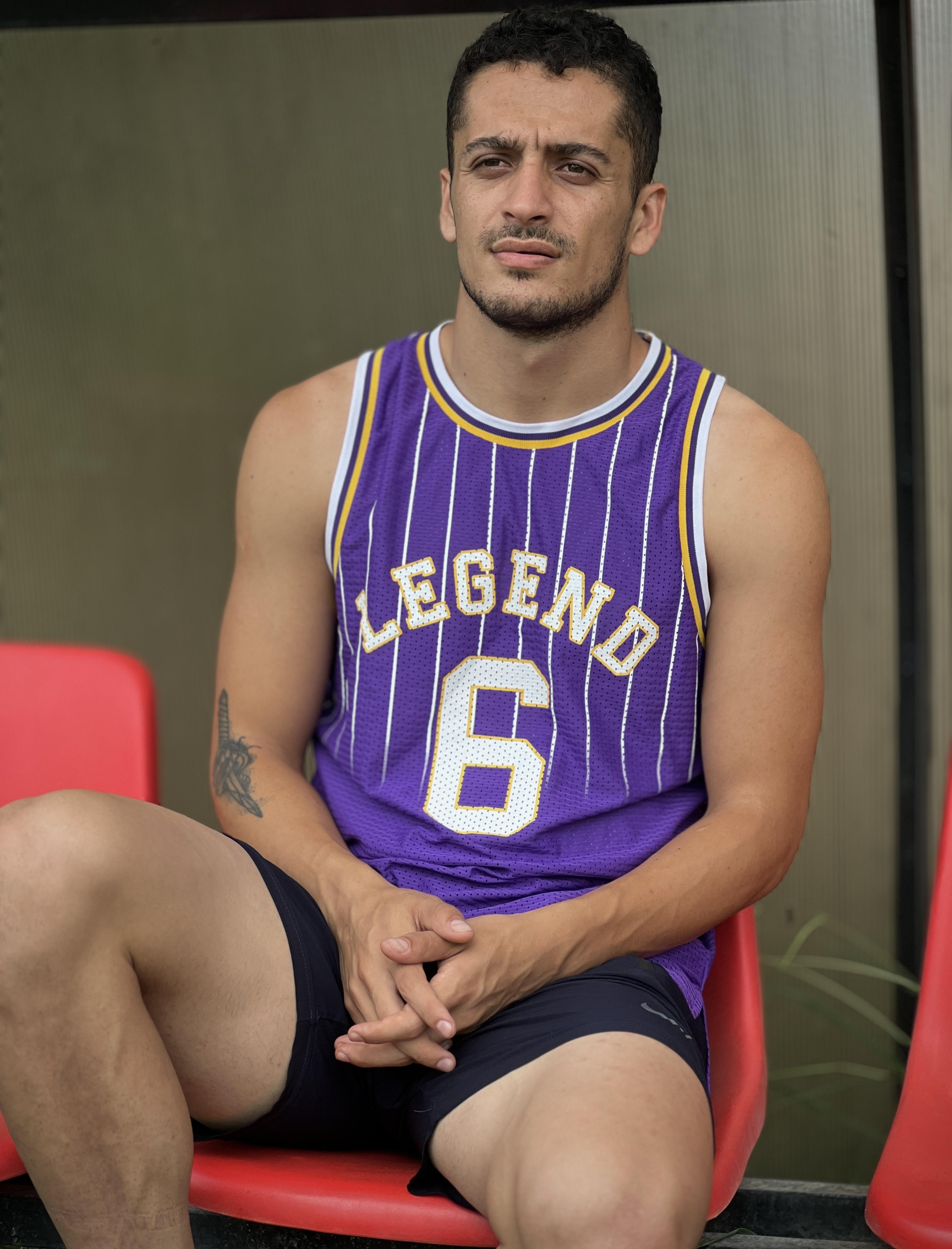

Personal information
- Date of birth: 30 December 2001 (age 24)
- Place of birth: Nowshahr, Iran
- Height: 1.83 m (6 ft 0 in)
- Position: Midfielder

Team information
- Current team: Sanat Naft
- Number: 38

Youth career
- Persepolis Qaem Shahr
- 2017: Oxin Alborz
- 2017–2018: Naft Tehran
- 2018–2019: Machine Sazi
- 2019: Zob Ahan
- 2019–2020: Esteghlal
- 2020–2021: Sabail

Senior career*
Years	Team	Apps	(Gls)
2021–2022	Shahr Khodro	10	(1)
2022–2023	Sanat Naft	11	(2)

International career
2017–2019	Iran U20		
- * Club domestic league appearances and goals

Ali Tari (Persian: علی تاری; born 30 December 2001) is an Iranian footballer who plays as a midfielder for Naft Abadan in the Persian Gulf Pro League

== Club career ==
=== Early career ===
Tari started his career as a youth player at Persepolis Qaem Shahr and then transferred to Oxin Alborz. He also played for Naft Tehran and Machine Sazi before joining Zob Ahan. In July 2019, he joined Esteghlal with a five-year contract.

== International career ==
In August 2017, Tari was invited to the Iran national under-20 football team by Amir Hossein Peyrovani.
