= Shahin Taherkhani =

Iranian footballer

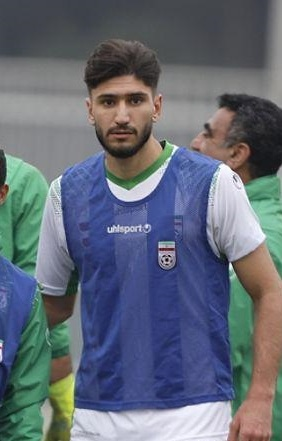
- Taherkhani in Iran U23 team training in 2019

Personal information
- Date of birth: 7 January 1997 (age 29)
- Place of birth: Qazvin, Iran
- Height: 1.93 m (6 ft 4 in)
- Position: Defender

Team information
- Current team: Zob Ahan
- Number: 57

Youth career
- 2015–2016: Gostaresh Foulad
- 2016–2018: Paykan
- 2018–2019: Esteghlal

Senior career*
Years	Team	Apps	(Gls)
2014–2016	Gostaresh Foulad	0	(0)
2017–2018	Paykan	0	(0)
2019–2020	Esteghlal	6	(0)
2020–2021	Paykan	1	(0)
2021–2023	Nassaji Mazandaran	28	(1)
2024	Fajr Sepasi	11	(4)
2024–2025	Pars Jonoubi	24	(1)
2025–	Zob Ahan	14	(0)

International career
2019	Iran U23	3	(0)
- * Club domestic league appearances and goals as of 21 April 2025

Shahin Taherkhani (Persian: شاهین طاهرخانی; born 7 January 1997) is an Iranian professional footballer who plays as a centre-back for Persian Gulf Pro League club Zob Ahan.

== Club career ==
=== Esteghlal ===
He made his debut for Esteghlal in first fixtures of 2019–20 Iran Pro League against Machine Sazi.

=== Paykan ===
In November 2020, he moved to Paykan on deadline day. He made his debut for the club in the second week of the 2020–21 Persian Gulf Pro League against Shahr Khodro. They won that game 1–0, he played 46 minutes and got subbed off for Mohammad Amin Darvishi.
