= Aref Gholami =

Iranian footballer

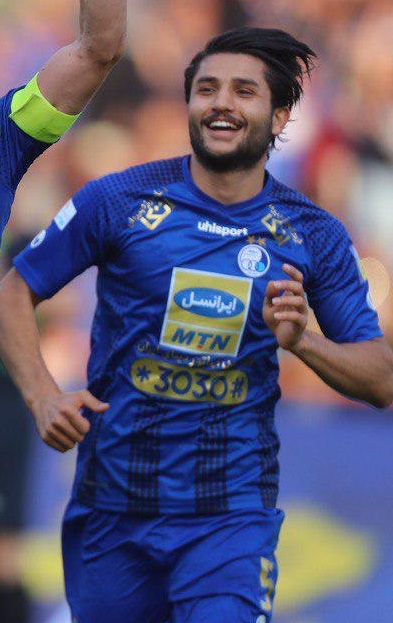

Personal information
- Date of birth: 19 April 1997 (age 29)
- Place of birth: Gorgan, Iran
- Height: 1.78 m (5 ft 10 in)
- Positions: Center back; defensive midfielder

Team information
- Current team: Chadormalou
- Number: 8

Youth career
- 2010–2016: Sepahan

Senior career*
Years	Team	Apps	(Gls)
2016–2018	Sepahan	32	(0)
2018	Zob Ahan	7	(0)
2018–2019	Foolad	8	(0)
2019–2023	Esteghlal	75	(2)
2024	Velež Mostar	7	(0)
2024–2025	Tractor	2	(0)
2025–2026	Esteghlal	9	(0)
2026–	Chadormalou	8	(0)

International career^{‡}
2015–2017	Iran U20	7	(0)
2018–2021	Iran U23	4	(0)
2022–	Iran	1	(0)
- * Club domestic league appearances and goals as of 5 February 2026 ‡ National team caps and goals as of 24 March 2022

Aref Gholami (Persian: عارف غلامی; born 19 April 1997) is an Iranian footballer who plays as a center back.

== Club career ==
He made his first Persian Gulf Pro League debut on 1 December 2016 against Gostaresh Foolad.

== International career ==
On the 4th of October 2020, Dragan Skočić called him up to the national team for friendlies against Uzbekistan and Mali. He made his debut for Iran on 24 March 2022 against South Korea.

== Personal life ==
His older brother Ali Gholami is also a footballer.

On 9 February 2026, in the midst of the 2025–2026 Iranian protests, Gholami publicly objected to being included on a list of supporters of the 1979 Islamic Revolution by the Ministry of Sport and Youth, ahead of the Revolution's anniversary.

== Career statistics ==
=== Club career ===
As of 5 February 2026

Club	Season	League			Cup		Continental		Other		Total	
Club	Season	Division	Apps	Goals	Apps	Goals	Apps	Goals	Apps	Goals	Apps	Goals
2016–17	Sepahan	Pro League	15	0	2	0	—		—		17	0
2017–18	Sepahan	Pro League	17	0	0	0	—		—		17	0
2018–19	Zob Ahan	Pro League	7	0	0	0	—		—		7	0
2018–19	Foolad	Pro League	8	0	0	0	—		—		8	0
2019–20	Esteghlal	Pro League	21	1	5	0	3	0	—		29	1
2020–21	Esteghlal	Pro League	20	0	3	0	5	0	—		28	0
2021–22	Esteghlal	Pro League	12	0	1	0	—		—		13	0
2022–23	Esteghlal	Pro League	22	1	3	0	—		1	0	26	1
2025–26	Esteghlal	Pro League	9	0	1	0	0	0	0	0	10	0
Total			84	2	13	0	8	0	1	0	106	2
2023–24	Velež Mostar	Premier League Bosnia	7	0	0	0	—		—		7	0
2024–25	Tractor	Pro League	2	0	1	0	2	0	—		5	0
Career total			140	2	16	0	10	0	1	0	167	2

=== International ===
As of match played 24 March 2022

Appearances and goals by national team and year
National team	Year	Apps	Goals
Iran	2022	1	0
Total		1	0

== Honours ==
Esteghlal

- Persian Gulf Pro League: 2021–22
- Hazfi Cup runner-up: 2019–20, 2020–21
- Iranian Super Cup: 2022

Tractor

- Persian Gulf Pro League: 2024–25
