= Amirhossein Bagherpour =

Iranian footballer (born 1997)

Personal information
- Full name: Amirhossein Bagherpour
- Date of birth: November 11, 1997 (age 28)
- Place of birth: Babol, Iran
- Position: Centre forward

Team information
- Current team: Naft Masjed Soleyman
- Number: 14

Youth career
- –2018: Foolad

Senior career*
| Years | Team | Apps | (Gls) |
| 2018–2020 | Foolad | 17 | (1) |
| 2018–2019 | → Esteghlal Khuzestan (loan) | 15 | (2) |
| 2020–2021 | Naft Masjed Soleyman | 2 | (0) |
| 2021–2022 | F.C. Nassaji Mazandaran | 2 | (0) |
- * Club domestic league appearances and goals

Amirhossein Bagherpour (Persian: امیرحسین باقرپور; born November 11, 1997) is an Iranian footballer who plays as a forward for Iranian club Naft Masjed Soleyman in the Persian Gulf Pro League.
