= Mohammad Bolboli =

Iranian footballer (born 1998)

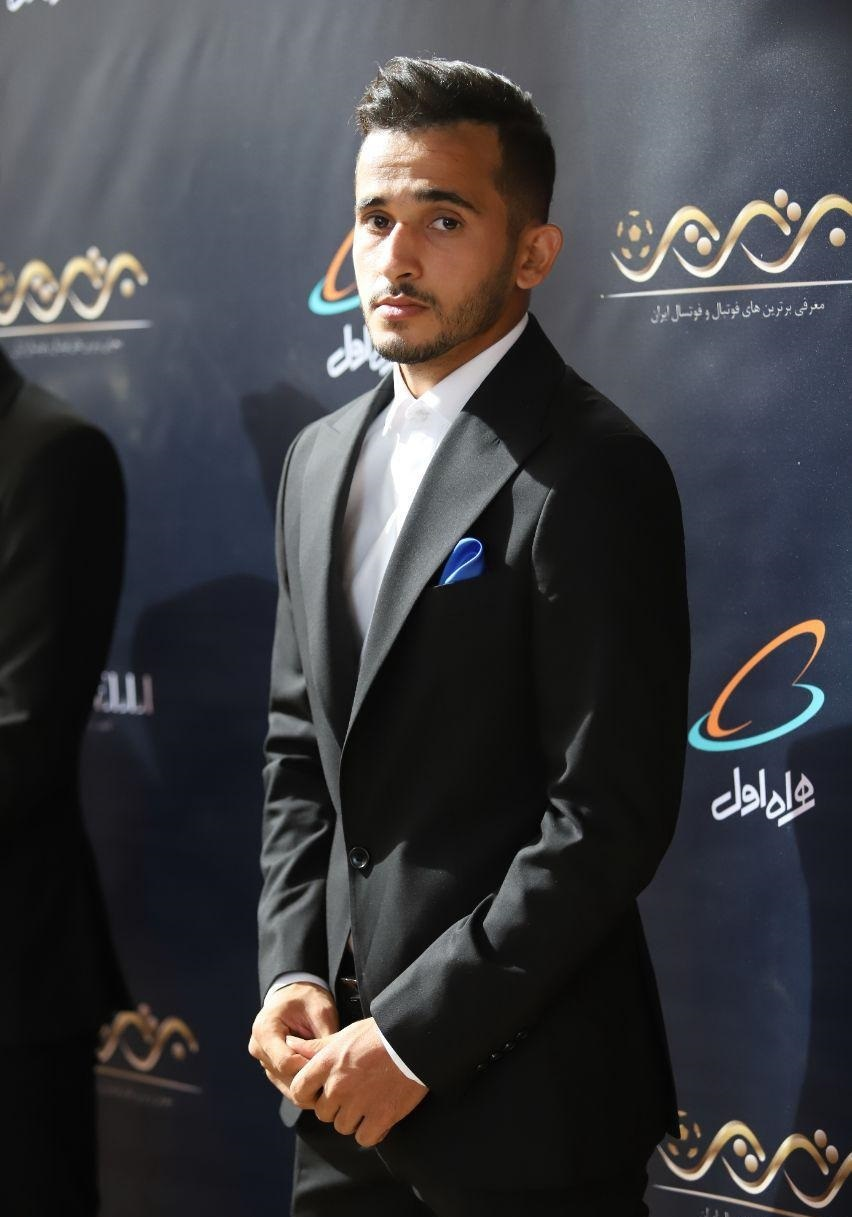

Personal information
- Full name: Mohammad Bolboli Rami
- Date of birth: 11 January 1998 (age 28)
- Place of birth: Fereydunkenar, Iran
- Height: 1.77 m (5 ft 10 in)
- Position: Left winger

Team information
- Current team: Tractor
- Number: 72

Youth career
- 2016: Parseh Tehran
- 2016–2017: Tehran Mobaddel
- 2017–2018: Damash Tehran
- 2018–2019: Saipa

Senior career*
Years	Team	Apps	(Gls)
2019	Sepidrood	9	(7)
2019–2021	Esteghlal	4	(0)
2020–2021	→ Naft Masjed Soleyman (loan)	5	(0)
2021	Naft Masjed Soleyman	10	(1)
2022–	Tractor	2	(0)
- * Club domestic league appearances and goals

Mohammad Bolboli (Persian: محمد بلبلی; born 11 January 1998) is an Iranian professional football player who plays as a left winger who currently plays for Iranian club Tractor in the Persian Gulf Pro League.

== Club career ==
=== Sepidrood ===
He made his debut for Sepidrood in 17th fixtures of 2018–19 Iran Pro League against Sepahan S.C. while he substituted in for Mohammad Gholami.
