= Hrvoje Milić =

Croatian footballer (born 1989)

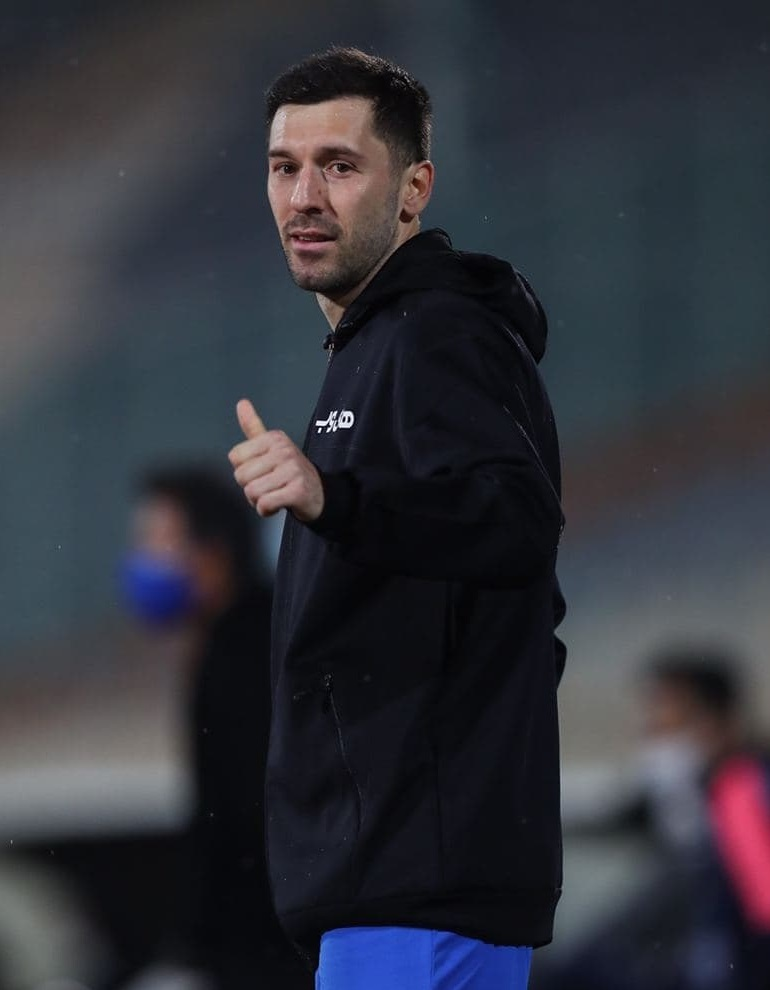
- Milić with Esteghlal in 2020

Personal information
- Date of birth: 10 May 1989 (age 37)
- Place of birth: Osijek, SR Croatia, Yugoslavia
- Height: 1.83 m (6 ft 0 in)
- Positions: Full-back; winger

Youth career
- Osijek
- 2006–2008: Hajduk Split

Senior career*
Years	Team	Apps	(Gls)
2008–2009	Hajduk Split	3	(0)
2009–2010	Djurgården	36	(3)
2011–2013	Istra 1961	57	(5)
2013–2015	Rostov	45	(1)
2015–2016	Hajduk Split	28	(1)
2016–2017	Fiorentina	17	(0)
2017–2018	Olympiacos	2	(0)
2018	Napoli	0	(0)
2019	Crotone	9	(0)
2019–2021	Esteghlal	34	(3)
2022	Zrinski Jurjevac	12	(0)

International career
2013–2014	Croatia	6	(0)
- * Club domestic league appearances and goals

Hrvoje Milić (Croatian pronunciation: [xr̩̂ʋoje mǐlitɕ]; born 10 May 1989) is a former Croatian professional footballer who played as a full-back. He played for Fiorentina in Italy, Osijek, Hajduk Split and Istra 1961 in Croatia, Djurgården in Sweden, Rostov in Russia and Esteghlal in Iran.

== Club career ==
Born in Osijek, Milić started his career at the youth sides of NK Osijek before moving to HNK Hajduk Split where he first started in their under-19 side. He made his professional debut in the Croatian Derby against GNK Dinamo Zagreb on 8 March 2008. He made one further appearance that season.

Milić moved to Djurgårdens IF in March 2009 after failing to crack the first team at Hajduk. He debuted, coming in as a substitute, in the 2009 Allsvenskan season premiere against Örebro SK. At Djurgården, he immediately became a prominent first team member, making 30 appearances in his first season with the club. He also managed four goals and four assists that same season. Quoting disciplinary problems, Djurgården let Milić return to Croatia for the second half of the 2010 season.

He moved back to Croatia in July 2011, joining NK Istra 1961 on a free transfer. He was a starter throughout the 11–12 season, making 26 appearances and scoring one goal. His next season was even more successful, making 31 appearances, scoring four goals and making three assists.

In July 2013, he moved to FC Rostov in a deal worth around €350k. In Milić's first season at Rostov, he made 29 appearances, scoring one goal and managing four assists mostly from a left back position.

=== Return to Hajduk ===
In August 2015 he signed a three-year contract with Hajduk Split. Milić made his Hajduk debut in a Europa League qualifier against Slovan Liberec on the 20th of that same month. His first season at Hajduk was below average and most people considered that he didn't justify the expectations of the club and fans. Milić made 42 appearances in his return season, scoring one goal and making seven assists.

=== Fiorentina ===
On 16 August 2016, Milić joined Serie A side ACF Fiorentina in a deal which saw a reported €700.000 transfer fee go to Hajduk.

=== Olympiakos ===
On 22 July 2017, only after a season in Serie A (that has been disappointing), Milić has been sold to reigning Greek champions Olympiacos for €1.5 million. Having fallen surplus to requirements by his then club managers Besnik Hasi and Takis Lemonis, his contract was officially terminated by the Reds on 31 January 2018, playing only four games with the club in all competitions.

=== Napoli ===
On 23 February 2018, he returned to the Italian Serie A after being signed by S.S.C. Napoli who signed him to replace the injured Faouzi Ghoulam.

=== Crotone ===
On 31 January 2019, he signed with the Italian Serie B club Crotone.

=== Esteghlal ===
On 19 August 2019, Milić moved to Iranian club Esteghlal on a two-year contract.

== Career statistics ==
=== Club ===
Appearances and goals by club, season and competition
Club	Season	League			National cup		Continental (Note: Includes UEFA Europa League and AFC Champions League.)		Other		Total	
Club	Season	Division	Apps	Goals	Apps	Goals	Apps	Goals	Apps	Goals	Apps	Goals
Esteghlal	2019–20	Persian Gulf Pro League	22	2	4	0	4	0	—		30	2
Esteghlal	2020–21	Persian Gulf Pro League	12	1	1	0	6	0	—		19	1
Esteghlal	Total		34	3	5	0	10	0	—		49	3
Career total			34	3	5	0	10	0	0	0	49	3

== Honours ==
Esteghlal

- Hazfi Cup: runner-up: 2019–20, 2020–21
