= Ali Dashti (footballer) =

Iranian footballer

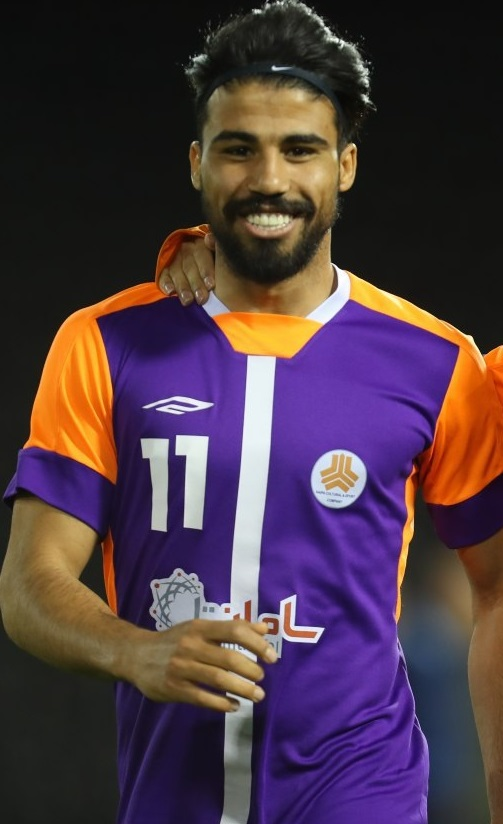

Personal information
- Date of birth: 18 January 1994 (age 32)
- Place of birth: Kangan, Iran
- Height: 1.73 m (5 ft 8 in)
- Positions: Midfielder; right back

Team information
- Current team: Pars Jonoubi Jam
- Number: 8

Youth career
- –2015: Iranjavan U21

Senior career*
Years	Team	Apps	(Gls)
2015–2016	Paykan	3	(0)
2016–2018	Pars Jonoubi Jam	42	(5)
2018–2019	Saipa	24	(4)
2019–2020	Esteghlal	14	(0)
2020–2021	Zob Ahan	9	(1)
2021	Gol Gohar Sirjan	6	(0)
2021–2022	Tractor	11	(0)
2022–2023	Aluminium Arak	4	(0)
2023–	Pars Jonoubi Jam	27	(5)
- * Club domestic league appearances and goals as of 16 April 2025

Ali Dashti (Persian: علی دشتی; born 18 January 1994) is an Iranian midfielder who plays for Pars Jonoubi Jam in the Azadegan League.

== Club career statistics ==
As of 1 June 2018.

Club	Division	Season	League		Hazfi Cup		Asia		Total	
Club	Division	Season	Apps	Goals	Apps	Goals	Apps	Goals	Apps	Goals
Paykan	Division 1	2015–16	3	0	0	0	–	–	3	0
Pars Jonoubi	Division 1	2016–17	18	1	0	0	–	–	18	1
Pars Jonoubi	Iran Pro League	2017–18	24	4	0	0	0	0	24	4
Career Totals			45	5	0	0	0	0	45	5
