= Sina Khadempour =

Iranian footballer (born 1997)

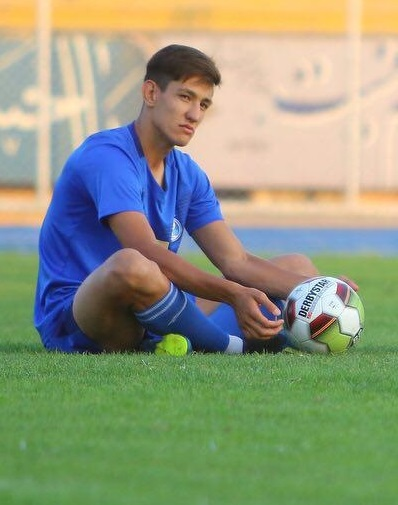

Personal information
- Full name: Siena Khadempour Khalifehlou
- Date of birth: January 9, 1997 (age 29)
- Place of birth: Ardabil, Iran
- Height: 1.90 m (6 ft 3 in)
- Position: Defensive midfielder

Team information
- Current team: Kheybar Khorramabad
- Number: 14

Youth career
- 2014–2015: Fajr Tehran
- 2015–2017: Naft Tehran

Senior career*
| Years | Team | Apps | (Gls) |
| 2016–2017 | Naft Tehran | 7 | (0) |
| 2017–2022 | Esteghlal | 7 | (0) |
| 2017–2018 | → Naft Tehran (loan) | 13 | (0) |
| 2019 | → Gol Gohar (loan) | 2 | (0) |
| 2021–2022 | → Naft MIS (loan) | 17 | (0) |
| 2022–2023 | Chooka Talesh | 28 | (4) |
| 2023– | Kheybar Khorramabad | 45 | (1) |
| 2025–2026 | → Malavan (loan) | 12 | (0) |

International career^{‡}
| 2015–2017 | Iran U20 | 3 | (0) |
| 2017–2020 | Iran U23 | 4 | (0) |
- * Club domestic league appearances and goals as of 3 July 2022 ‡ National team caps and goals as of 6 March 2017

Sina Khadempour (Persian: سینا خادم پور, born January 9, 1997) is an Iranian professional football player who most recently played for Kheybar Khorramabad in the Persian Gulf Pro League. He has also played for the Iran national under-23 football team.

== Club career ==
=== Club career statistics ===
As of 15 May 2017

| Club performance | | | League | | Cup | | Continental | | Total | |
| Club | League | Season | Apps | Goals | Apps | Goals | Apps | Goals | Apps | Goals |
| Iran | | | League | | Hazfi Cup | | Asia | | Total | |
|---|---|---|---|---|---|---|---|---|---|---|
| Naft Tehran | Pro League | 2017–18 | 13 | 0 | 1 | 0 | – | – | 14 | 0 |
| Career Total | | | 13 | 0 | 1 | 0 | 0 | 0 | 14 | 0 |

== International career ==
Khadempour has played 2 matches for Iran under-20 in 2017 FIFA U-20 World Cup.

== Honours ==
Naft Tehran

- Hazfi Cup: 2016–17
