= F.C. Pars Jonoubi Jam =

Iranian football club

Pars Jonoubi پارس جنوبی
- Full name: Football Club Pars Jonoubi Jam
- Nicknames: زنبورهای جنوب; Zenburhai Jinub (South bees)
- Founded: 2007; 19 years ago
- Ground: Takhti Jam
- Capacity: 15,000
- Owner: Pars Special Economic Energy Zone
- Chairman: Morad Moradi
- Head Coach: Mehdi Rajabzadeh
- League: Azadegan League
- 2024–25: Azadegan League, 6th
Home colours	Away colours	Third colours

Football Club Pars Jonoubi Jam (Persian: باشگاه فوتبال پارس جنوبی جم; Bashgah-e Futbal-e Pars Jinubi), commonly known as Pars Jonoubi Jam, is an Iranian football club based in Jam, Bushehr. They were promoted to the Persian Gulf Pro League in the 2016–17 season.

The football team plays their home games at the Shohada Stadium which has a seating capacity of 15,000. The club is owned and supported by the PSEEZ (Pars Special Energy Economic Zone) and is named after the South Pars Gas Field.

== History ==
=== Establishment ===
In 2007, F.C. Pars Junubi Jam Bushehr was founded by the PSEEZ (Pars Special Energy Economic Zone). In 2010 Pars Jonoubi Jam were allowed to play in Iran Football's 2nd Division. In 2015–16 Iran Football's 2nd Division Pars Jonoubi Jam finished second in their group. They won their promotion play-off against Naft va Gaz Gachsaran and were promoted to the Azadegan League.

=== Azadegan League ===
On 7 August 2016, Pars Junubi Jam played its first ever Azadegan League match against Mes Rafsanjan. They won the game 1–0. On 24 April 2017 Pars Jam defeated Esteghlal Ahvaz 2–1 and were crowned Azadegan League champions and were promoted to the Persian Gulf Pro League for the 2017–18 season.

=== Persian Gulf Pro League ===
In September 2017, Pars led the league after six rounds following their win against Esteghlal.

== Supporters ==
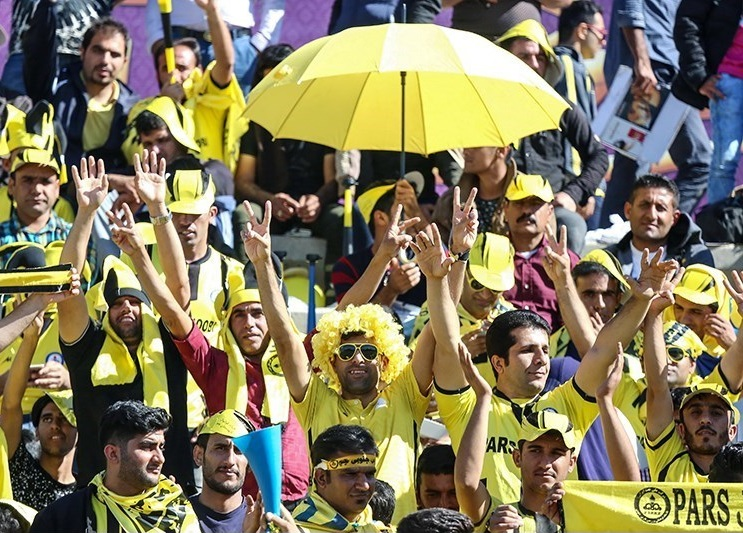

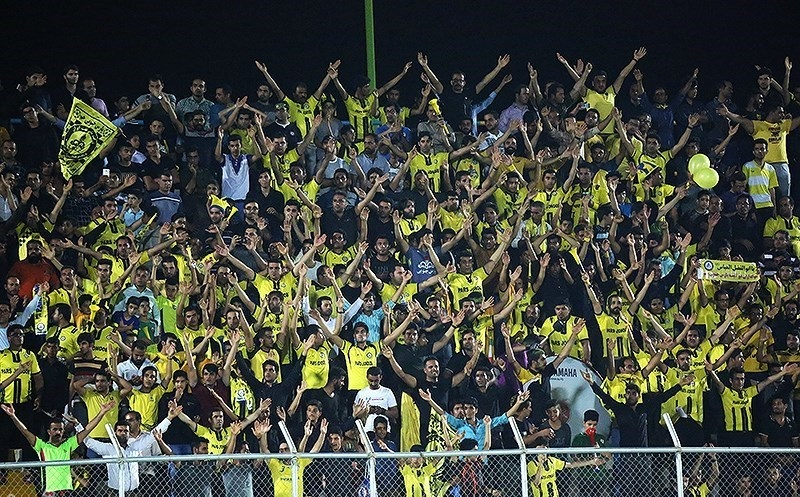

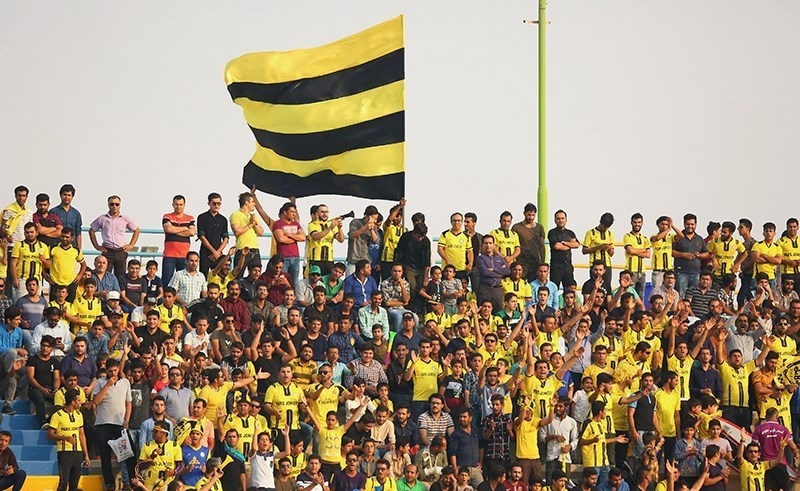

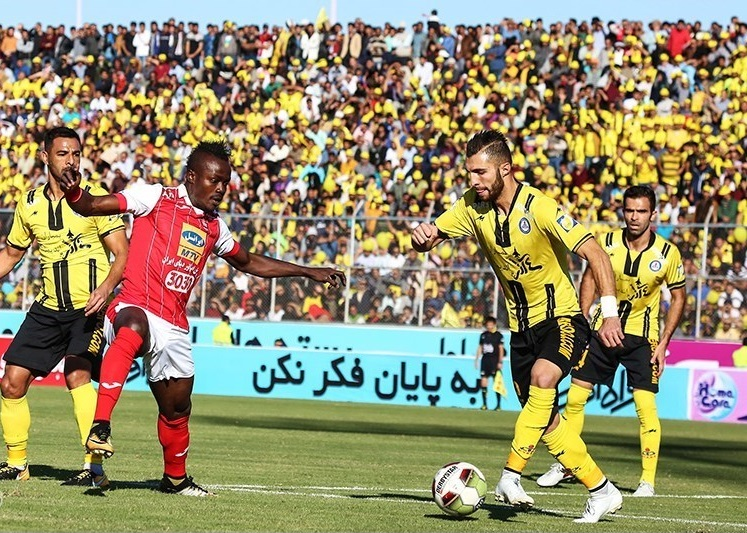

== Stadium ==
The home venue of Pars Junubi Jam is the Shohada Stadium in Jam, Bushehr, Iran with a 10,000 seating capacity. It is owned by the PSEEZ (Pars Special Energy Economic Zone).

== Season-by-Season ==
The table below shows the achievements of the club in various competitions.

Season	League	Position	Hazfi Cup	Notes
2010–11	2nd Division	5th/Group A	Did not qualify
2011–12	2nd Division	9th/Group A	Did not qualify
2012–13	2nd Division	4th/Group A
2013–14	2nd Division	7th/Group B
2014–15	2nd Division	3rd/Group B
2015–16	2nd Division	2nd/Group A		Promoted
2016–17	Azadegan League	1st	Round of 32	Promoted
2017–18	Iran Pro League	5th	Round of 32
2018–19	Iran Pro League	12th	Round of 16
2019–20	Iran Pro League	15th	Round of 32	Relegated

== Honours ==
=== Domestic competitions ===
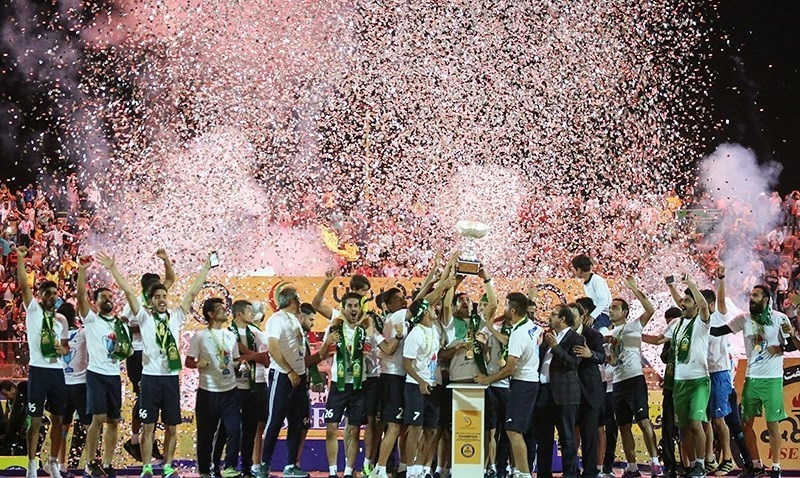
Pars Jam players celebrating promotion to the Persian Gulf Pro League in 2017.

==== League ====
- Azadegan League
  - Champions (1): 2016–17

== Players ==
=== First team squad ===
As of 1 March 2025

Note: Flags indicate national team as defined under FIFA eligibility rules; some limited exceptions apply. Players may hold more than one non-FIFA nationality.

No.	Pos.	Nation	Player
1	GK	IRI	Mehdi Nourollahi
2	DF	IRI	Mojtaba Moghtadaei
3	DF	IRI	Mohammadreza Khedri
4	DF	IRI	Amirhossein Salehi
5	DF	IRI	Fardin Moaveni
6	MF	IRI	Mohammad Soltani Mehr
7	FW	IRI	Homayoun Eftekhari
8	FW	IRI	Ali Dashti
9	FW	IRI	Hamidreza Naderi
11	MF	IRI	Hossein Pouramini (Captain)
12	GK	IRI	Ahmad Mehrabi
17	DF	IRI	Mohammad Mohammadzadeh
18	DF	IRI	Ali Derakhshan
21	MF	IRI	Siyam Mohammadzadeh
22	GK	IRI	Ali Hajivand

No.	Pos.	Nation	Player
23	FW	IRI	Abolfazl Mostared
24	FW	IRI	Armin Ahmadi
25	MF	IRI	Amirhossein Akhavan
27	FW	IRI	Reza Khani
48	MF	IRI	Mohammad Khorram
49	FW	IRI	Mohammad Alizadeh
57	DF	IRI	Shahin Taherkhani
66	MF	IRI	Omid Seydali
68	MF	IRI	Taha Hosseini
70	MF	IRI	Abbas Bouazar
71	MF	IRI	Koroush Ezhdehakosh
72	DF	IRI	Mohsen Nikaeein
76	FW	IRI	Fardin Najafi
77	MF	IRI	Reza Jafari
99	FW	IRI	Alireza Hadi
