= 2018–19 Tractor S.C. season =

Tractor
2018–19 season
- Owner: Mohammad Reza Zonuzi
- Chairman: Sadegh Deroudgar (until 12 August 2018); Alireza Asadi (From 12 August 2018 until 6 January 2019); Ayoub Behtaj (From 8 February 2019 until 18 March 2019)
- Manager: John Toshack (until 17 September 2018); Mohammad Taghavi(interim) (from 17 September 2018 until 9 January 2019); Georges Leekens (from 13 January 2019 until 18 May 2019)
- Stadium: Yadegar-e Emam Stadium
- Persian Gulf Pro League: 5th
- Hazfi Cup: Round of 32
- Top goalscorer: League: Anthony Stokes (11); All: Anthony Stokes (13)
- Highest home attendance: 80,000 v Esteghlal (15 February 2019)
- Average home league attendance: 47,055
Home colours	Away colours

The 2018–19 season was the Tractor Sports Club’s 11th season in the Iran Pro League, and their 10th consecutive season in the top division of Iranian football. They will also be competed in the Hazfi Cup, and 48th year in existence as a football club.

== Players ==
=== First team squad ===
As of 3 September 2018.

No.	Name	Nationality	Position (s)	Date of Birth (Age)	Signed From
Goalkeepers
1	Mohsen Forouzan	(Iran)	GK	May 3, 1988 (aged 30)	(Iran) Pars Jonoubi Jam
22	Alireza Heidari	(Iran)	GK	December 1, 1992 (aged 26)	(Iran) Malavan
33	Mahdi Mohammadian	(Iran)	GK	March 5, 1997 (aged 21)	(Iran) U21
Defenders
2	Mohammad Tayyebi	(Iran)	DF	September 11, 1986 (aged 32)	(Iran) Pars Jonoubi Jam
3	Reza Sharbati	(Iran)	LB, LM	February 16, 1995 (aged 23)	(Iran) Siah Jamegan
5	Ali Abdollahzadeh	(Iran)	DF, RB	January 4, 1993 (aged 25)	(Iran) Sanat Naft
16	Mohammadreza Mehdizadeh	(Iran)	DF	February 18, 1994 (aged 24)	(Iran) Damash Gilan
26	Ehsan Hajsafi	(Iran)	LB, LM, DM	February 25, 1990 (aged 28)	(Greece) Olympiacos
29	Iman Salimi	(Iran)	DF, DM	June 1, 1996 (aged 22)	(Iran) Pars Jonoubi Jam
40	Ali Esmaeili	(Iran)	DF	December 16, 1996 (aged 22)	(Iran) U21
70	Amir Reza Nasr Azadani	(Iran)	RB, RM	February 7, 1996 (aged 22)	(Iran) Rah Ahan
77	Mohammad Moslemipour	(Iran)	LB	May 25, 1997 (aged 21)	(Iran) U19
Midfielders
6	Alireza Naghizadeh	(Iran)	DM, CM, AM	March 3, 1993 (aged 25)	(Iran) Gostaresh Foolad
7	Masoud Shojaei	(Iran)	AM, CM, RW, LW	June 9, 1984 (aged 34)	(Greece) AEK Athens
8	Ali Taheran ^{U23}	(Iran)	DM, CM	April 7, 1997 (aged 21)	(Iran) U21
9	Mehdi Mehdipour	(Iran)	DM, CM, AM	February 18, 1994 (aged 24)	(Iran) Zob Ahan
11	Danial Esmaeilifar	(Iran)	RM, RB, RW	February 26, 1993 (aged 25)	(Iran) Zob Ahan
21	Ashkan Dejagah	(Iran)	AM, RW, LW	July 5, 1986 (aged 32)	(England) Nottingham Forest
99	Ghaem Eslamikhah	(Iran)	AM, RM, LM	January 17, 1995 (aged 23)	(Iran) Baadraan
Forwards
10	Ehsan Pahlavan	(Iran)	LW, LM	July 25, 1993 (aged 25)	(Iran) Zob Ahan
14	Yousef Seyedi	(Iran)	LW, RW, CF	March 8, 1996 (aged 22)	(Iran) Gostaresh Foolad
17	Mohammad Reza Azadi ^{U21}	(Iran)	CF, RW	December 7, 1999 (aged 19)	(Iran) U19
19	Lee Erwin	(Scotland)	CF, LW, RW	November 7, 1994 (aged 24)	(Scotland) Kilmarnock
20	Reza Abdi ^{U23}	(Iran)	CF	May 11, 1996 (aged 22)	(Iran) U21
24	Yukiya Sugita	(Japan)	LW, RW, AM, CF	April 22, 1993 (aged 25)	(Sweden) Dalkurd
28	Anthony Stokes	(Republic of Ireland)	CF, SS, LW	July 25, 1988 (aged 30)	(Greece) Apollon Smyrnis
32	Hamed Hosseinalizadeh ^{U21}	(Iran)	LW, LM, RW	January 9, 1998 (aged 20)	(Iran) U19

== Transfers ==
=== In ===
No.	Pos.	Nat.	Name	Age	Moving from	Type	Transfer window	Ends	Source
1	GK	(Iran)	Mohsen Forouzan	30	Pars Jonoubi	Transfer	Summer	2021	
2	DF	(Iran)	Mohammad Tayyebi	31	Pars Jonoubi	Transfer	Summer	2020	
4	DF	(Iran)	Mohammad Ahle Shakheh	24	Foolad	Transfer	Summer	2021	
5	DF	(Iran)	Ali Abdollahzadeh	25	Sanat Naft Abadan	Transfer	Summer	2020	
6	MF	(Iran)	Alireza Naghizadeh	25	Gostaresh Foolad	Transfer	Summer	2021	
14	FW	(Iran)	Yousef Seyyedi	22	Gostaresh Foolad	Transfer	Summer	2023	
15	FW	(England)	Harry Forrester	27	(Scotland) Rangers	Transfer	Summer	2020	
28	FW	(Republic of Ireland)	Anthony Stokes	29	(Greece) Apollon Smyrnis	Transfer	Summer	2020	
24	MF	(Japan)	Yukiya Sugita	25	(Sweden) Dalkurd	Transfer	Summer	2021	
78	MF	(Iran)	Sobhan Khaghani	18	Meshki Pooshan	Transfer	Summer	2020	
22	GK	(Iran)	Alireza Heidari	25	Malavan	Transfer	Summer	2020	
7	MF	(Iran)	Masoud Shojaei	33	(Greece) AEK Athens	Transfer	Summer	2021	
21	MF	(Iran)	Ashkan Dejagah	31	(England) Nottingham Forest	Transfer	Summer	2021	
19	FW	(Scotland)	Lee Erwin	23	(Scotland) Kilmarnock	Transfer	Summer	2022	
26	DF	(Iran)	Ehsan Hajsafi	28	(Greece) Olympiacos	Transfer	Summer	2021	
29	DF	(Iran)	Iman Salimi	22	Pars Jonoubi	Transfer	Summer	2022	
23	DF	(Guinea)	Kévin Constant	31	(Switzerland) Sion	Transfer	Winter	2022	
97	GK	(Iran)	Mohammad Reza Akhbari	25	Saipa	Transfer	Winter	2022	
36	DF	(Iran)	Ahmad Mousavi	26	Machine Sazi	Transfer	Winter	2021	
90	FW	(Iran)	Sasan Ansari	27	Sepahan	Transfer	Winter	2021	
66	MF	(Iran)	Akbar Imani	26	Sanat Naft	Transfer	Winter		

=== Out ===
No.	Pos.	Nat.	Name	Age	Moving to	Type	Transfer window	Source
1	GK	(Iran)	Farzin Garousian	25	(Iran) Esteghlal Khuzestan	Released	Summer	
2	DF	(Iran)	Mohammad Iranpourian	32	(Iran) Sepahan	Transfer	Summer	
4	DF	(Iran)	Hadi Mohammadi	27	(Iran) Zob Ahan	End of loan	Summer	
4	DF	(Iran)	Mohammad Ahle Shakheh	24	(Iran) Machine Sazi	Transfer	Summer	
5	DF	(Croatia)	Šime Gregov	28	Unattached	Released	Summer	
28	DF	(Iran)	Mohammad Naderi	21	(Belgium) Kortrijk	Transfer	Summer	
23	DF	(Iran)	Aref Aghasi	21	(Iran) Foolad	End of loan	Summer	
6	MF	(Iran)	Mehdi Kiani	31	(Iran) Sepahan	Transfer	Summer	
15	MF	(England)	Harry Forrester	27	(Iran) Machine Sazi	Transfer	Summer	
30	MF	(Iran)	Amir Asadzadeh	21	(Iran) Fajr Sepasi	Transfer	Summer	
27	MF	(Iran)	Fakher Tahami	21	(Iran) Sanat Naft Abadan	End of loan	Summer	
66	MF	(Iran)	Sina Ashouri	29	Unattached	Released	Summer	
7	FW	(Iran)	Omid Alishah	26	(Iran) Persepolis	End of loan	Summer	
10	FW	(Iran)	Mohammad Ebrahimi	33	(Iran) Oxin Alborz	Transfer	Summer	
18	FW	(Bosnia and Herzegovina)	Sulejman Krpić	27	(Bosnia and Herzegovina) Željezničar Sarajevo	Transfer	Summer	
24	FW	(Iran)	Farzad Hatami	32	(Iran) Oxin Alborz	Transfer	Summer	
17	FW	(Iran)	Amir Arsalan Motahari	25	(Oman) Saham	Transfer	Summer	

== Coaching staff ==
As of 13 January 2018.

Position	Staff
Head coach	(Belgium) Georges Leekens
Assistant coach	(Belgium) Patrick De Wilde (Iran) Amir Hossein Peiravani (Iran) Kazem Mahmoudi
Fitness coach	(Iran) Emad Mohajeri
Goalkeeper coach	(Iran) Amir Yousefi
Team Manager	(Iran) Hassan Azarnia
Media Officer	(Iran) Mostafa Manteghey

== Pre-season and friendlies ==
6 July 2018 Friendly	Tractor (Iran)	2–0	(Azerbaijan) Keşla	Ankara
17:30 DST+03:00	Pahlevan 10'; Reza Abdi 85'	Report		Stadium: Kızılcahamam Stadium

9 July 2018 Friendly	Gençlerbirliği (Turkey)	2–3	(Iran) Tractor	Ankara
18:00 DST+03:00	Ciftci 50'; Jaílton 85'	Report	Reza Abdi 43'; Esmaeilifar 44'; Mehdizadeh 56'	Stadium: Kızılcahamam Stadium

11 July 2018 Friendly	Tractor (Iran)	2–2	(Romania) Iași	Ankara
17:30 DST+03:00	Esmaeilifar 20'; Azadi 91'	Report		Stadium: Kızılcahamam Stadium

15 July 2018 Friendly	Sivasspor (Turkey)	1–1	(Iran) Tractor	Bolu
16:00 DST+03:00	Yandaş 6'	Report	Tayyebi 76'	Stadium: Karaçayır 3 Nolu Sahası

21 July 2018 Friendly	Tractor	0–0	Shahrdari Mahshahr	Tabriz
18:00 DST+04:30		Report		Stadium: Bonyan Diesel Stadium; Attendance: 2,000

== Competitions ==
=== Overview ===
Competition	First match	Last match	Starting round	Final position	Record							
Competition	First match	Last match	Starting round	Final position	Pld	W	D	L	GF	GA	GD	Win %
Pro League	27 July 2018	16 May 2019	Matchday 1		30	14	10	6	42	25	+17	46.67
Hazfi Cup	14 September 2018	14 September 2018	Round of 32	Round of 32	1	0	1	0	3	3	+0	0.00
Total					31	14	11	6	45	28	+17	45.16

Source: Competitions

=== Persian Gulf Pro League ===
==== Standings ====
Pos	Team	Pld	W	D	L	GF	GA	GD	Pts	Qualification or relegation
3	Esteghlal	30	16	9	5	40	13	+27	57	Qualification for 2020 AFC Champions League Qualifying play-offs
4	Padideh	30	16	8	6	32	16	+16	56	Qualification for 2020 AFC Champions League Qualifying play-offs
5	Tractor Sazi	30	14	10	6	42	25	+17	52	
6	Zob Ahan	30	9	13	8	28	28	0	40	
7	Saipa	30	9	11	10	28	33	−5	38	

Source: IPL Table
Rules for classification: 1) Points; 2) Goal difference; 3) Goals scored.

==== Results summary ====
Overall								Home						Away					
Pld	W	D	L	GF	GA	GD	Pts	W	D	L	GF	GA	GD	W	D	L	GF	GA	GD
30	14	10	6	42	25	+17	52	10	3	2	27	9	+18	4	7	4	15	16	−1

Last updated: 16 May 2019.
Source: Ipl Stats

==== Results by round ====
Round	1	2	3	4	5	6	7	8	9	10	11	12	13	14	15	16	17	18	19	20	21	22	23	24	25	26	27	28	29	30
Ground	A	H	A	H	A	H	A	H	A	H	A	H	A	A	H	H	A	H	A	H	A	H	A	H	A	H	A	H	H	A
Result	D	D	L	W	D	W	D	W	L	W	W	W	D	W	L	W	D	W	D	W	W	W	W	W	L	L	L	D	D	D
Position	12	12	15	9	11	6	6	6	7	4	4	4	4	4	4	4	5	4	5	5	4	4	2	2	2	4	4	5	5	5

Updated to match(es) played on 16 May 2019. Source: "Ipl".
A = Away; H = Home; W = Win; D = Draw; L = Loss

==== Matches ====
Win Draw Loss Postponed

Date Round	Home	Score	Away	Location

27 July 2018 1	Naft Masjed Soleyman	0–0	Tractor	Masjed Soleyman
20:45 DST+04:30	Vakia (yellow card) 57'; Asgari (yellow card) 74'	Report	Taheran (yellow card) 51'; Esmaeili (yellow card) 93'	Stadium: Behnam Mohammadi Stadium; Attendance: 5,000; Referee: Koopal Nazemi

3 August 2018 2	Tractor	1–1	Nassaji	Tabriz
20:00 DST+04:30	Taheran (yellow card) 32'; Stokes 41'	Report	Mamashli (yellow card) 43'; Abbaszadeh (yellow card) 63'; Nazari 67', (yellow card) 80'; Hamed Lak (yellow card) 73'	Stadium: Yadegar-e-Emam Stadium; Attendance: 0 Referee: Reza Kermanshahi

10 August 2018 3	Esteghlal	3–0	Tractor	Tehran
20:30 DST+04:30	Abdollahzadeh 13' (o.g.); Tabrizi 28'; Zakipour (yellow card) 37'; Esmaeili 51'	Report	Abdollahzadeh (yellow card) 83'	Stadium: Azadi Stadium; Attendance: 75,000; Referee: Mehdi Seyedali

17 August 2018 4	Tractor	1–0	Saipa	Tabriz
19:45 DST+04:30	Esmaeilifar 77'; Mehdipour (yellow card) 94'	Report	Dashti (yellow card) 24'; Sarfo (yellow card) 79'	Stadium: Yadegar-e-Emam Stadium; Attendance: 60,156; Referee: Mohammad Hossein Zahedifar

24 August 2018 5	Sepahan	2–2	Tractor	Isfahan
20:00 DST+04:30	Shahbazzadeh 35'; Kiani (yellow card) 65'; Pourghaz 89'	Report	Stokes 73'; Esmaeilifar 90'	Stadium: Foolad Shahr Stadium; Attendance: 12,000; Referee: Seyed Hossein Zargar

30 August 2018 6	Tractor	2–1	Machine Sazi	Tabriz
18:00 DST+04:30	Mehdizadeh (yellow card) 32'; Dejagah (yellow card) 45'; Stokes 48'; Shojaei 60'	Report	Zahedi (yellow card) 63'; Afraz 92'	Stadium: Yadegar-e-Emam Stadium; Attendance: 35,610; Referee: Ali Safaei

23 September 2018 7	Padideh	0–0	Tractor	Mashhad
19:00 DST+03:30	Khalatbari (yellow card) 72'	Report	Shojaei (yellow card) 68'	Stadium: Imam Reza Stadium; Attendance: 14,000; Referee: Mohammad Hossein Zahedifar

28 September 2018 8	Tractor	6–0	Esteghlal Khuzestan	Tabriz
17:40 DST+03:30	Abdollahzadeh 21'; Stokes 35' (pen.), 40', 64', 83'; Dejagah 90'	Report	Kiani (yellow card) 33'; Shahmakvandzadeh (yellow card) 38'; Hamdinejad (yellow card) 60'	Stadium: Yadegar-e-Emam Stadium; Attendance: 50,000; Referee: Yaser Hamrang

20 October 2018 9	Sanat Naft	2–1	Tractor	Abadan
18:00 DST+03:30	Reykani 17'; Kaabi (yellow card) 31'; Jabireh 76'; Ahmadi (yellow card) 86'; Gordan (yellow card) 96'	Report	Abdollahzadeh (yellow card) 33'; Stokes 74'; Tayyebi (yellow card) 82'	Stadium: Takhti Stadium; Attendance: 0 Referee: Seyed Hossein Zargar

26 October 2018 10	Tractor	2–1	Sepidrood	Tabriz
16:00 DST+03:30	Abdollahzadeh (yellow card) 38'; Mehdipour (yellow card) 57'; Shojaei (yellow card) 62', (goal) 86'; Erwin 94'	Report	Bayrami (yellow card) 42'; Tohidast (yellow card) 65'; Ebrahimi (yellow card) 76'; Maleki (yellow card) 82'; Nozhati 90'	Stadium: Yadegar-e-Emam Stadium; Attendance: 35,000; Referee: Reza Adel

2 November 2018 11	Paykan	1–2	Tractor	Qods
15:30 DST+03:30	Batista (yellow card) 72'; Ghazi 74'; Saghebi (yellow card) 75'	Report	Salimi 5'; Esmaeilifar 10'; Hajsafi (yellow card) 84'	Stadium: Shahr-e Qods Stadium; Attendance: 8,000; Referee: Ali Bayi

9 November 2018 12	Tractor	4–1	Zob Ahan	Tabriz
15:30 DST+03:30	Shojaei (yellow card) 28'; Erwin 57', 59', 64'; Shojaei 75'	Report	Fakhreddini (yellow card) 3'; Mosalman 27'; Mazaheri (yellow card) 55'; Mohammadi (yellow card) 57'; Hernández (yellow card) 78'	Stadium: Yadegar-e-Emam Stadium; Attendance: 70,000; Referee: Mohammad Hossein Zahedifar

25 November 2018 13	Persepolis	0–0	Tractor	Tehran
15:00 DST+03:30	Kamyabinia (yellow card) 33'	Report	Dejagah (yellow card) 85'	Stadium: Azadi Stadium; Attendance: 35,000; Referee: Mohammadreza Akbarian

1 December 2018 14	Pars Jonoubi Jam	0–1	Tractor	Jam
15:00 DST+03:30	Pour Amini (yellow card) 57'; Lotfi (yellow card) 76'	Report	Esmaeilifar (yellow card) 67'; Mehdipour 77'	Stadium: Takhti Stadium; Attendance: 7,000; Referee: Koopal Nazemi

14 December 2018 15	Tractor	1–2	Foolad	Tabriz
15:00 DST+03:30	Naghizadeh 76'; Hajsafi (yellow card) 90+1'	Report	Mirzaei 24'; Pereira 51' (pen.), (yellow card) 64'; Hardani (yellow card) 74'; Moradian (yellow card) 81'	Stadium: Yadegar-e-Emam Stadium; Attendance: 70,000; Referee: Bijan Heydari

6 February 2019 16	Tractor	3–0	Naft Masjed Soleyman	Tabriz
15:30 DST+03:30	Dejagah 50'; Sugita 56'; M. Hosseini 66' (o.g.)	Report	Sharifat (yellow card) 24'; Coulibaly (yellow card) 48'; Vakia (yellow card) 57'	Stadium: Yadegar-e-Emam Stadium; Attendance: 35,000; Referee: Reza Kermanshahi

10 February 2019 17	Nassaji Mazandaran	1–1	Tractor	Qaem Shahr
17:00 DST+03:30	Abdollahzadeh (yellow card) 44'; Jafari 74'	Report	Gvelesiani 17' (o.g.)	Stadium: Vatani Stadium; Attendance: 8,000; Referee: Mehdi Seyedali

15 February 2019 18	Tractor	1–0	Esteghlal	Tabriz
15:30 DST+03:30	Dejagah (yellow card) 45' , (goal) 53'; Imani (yellow card) 58'	Report	Shojaeian (yellow card) 32'; Cheshmi (yellow card) 90'	Stadium: Yadegar-e-Emam Stadium; Attendance: 70,000; Referee: Ashkan Khorshidi

24 February 2019 19	Saipa	0–0	Tractor	Qods
16:00 DST+03:30	Ramezani (yellow card) 45'; Sarfo (yellow card) 52'	Report	Dejagah (yellow card) 53'	Stadium: Shahr-e Qods Stadium; Attendance: 8,870; Referee: Vahid Kazemi

1 March 2019 20	Tractor	2–0	Sepahan	Tabriz
16:00 DST+03:30	Mehdipour 38'; Ansari (yellow card) 69'; Stokes 73' (pen.); Forouzan (yellow card) 78'	Report		Stadium: Yadegar-e-Emam Stadium; Attendance: 45,000; Referee: Ashkan Khorshidi

7 March 2019 21	Machine Sazi	0–2	Tractor	Tabriz
15:00 DST+03:30	Kanaani (yellow card) 90'	Report	Dejagah 23', (yellow card) 90+1'; Stokes 50', (yellow card) 86'	Stadium: Yadegar-e-Emam Stadium; Attendance: 17,000; Referee: Mohammadreza Akbarian

14 March 2019 22	Tractor	1–0	Padideh	Tabriz
16:00 DST+03:30	Stokes 21'; Shojaei (yellow card) 80'	Report	Aghajanpour (yellow card) 90+5'	Stadium: Yadegar-e-Emam Stadium; Attendance: 29,700; Referee: Bijan Heydari

30 March 2019 23	Esteghlal Khuzestan	0–3	Tractor	Ahvaz
19:00 DST+04:30	M. Karimi (yellow card) 53'; Kalantari (yellow card) 53'	Report	Sugita 16'; Esmaeilifar 42'; Salimi (yellow card) 58'; Imani (yellow card) 63'; Dejagah 66'	Stadium: Ghadir Stadium; Attendance: 400; Referee: Amir Arab Baraghi

5 April 2019 24	Tractor	1–0	Sanat Naft	Tabriz
17:00 DST+04:30	Shojaei (yellow card) 18'; Ansari 42'; Mousavi (yellow card) 90+5'	Report	Kandji (yellow card) 32'; Kaabi (yellow card) 90+5'	Stadium: Yadegar-e-Emam Stadium; Attendance: 40,000; Referee: Reza Adel

12 April 2019 25	Sepidrood	3–1	Tractor	Rasht
17:00 DST+04:30	Bayrami 2', 66'; Ferdousi 33'; Shenani (yellow card) 41'; Sheikh Soleimani (yellow card) 45'; Bolboli (yellow card) 90+2'; Aghaeipour (yellow card) 90+2' (yellow-red card) 90+5'	Report	Shojaei 23'; Tayyebi (yellow card) 37'; Imani (yellow card) 54'	Stadium: Sardar Jangal Stadium; Attendance: 8,000; Referee: Seyed Reza Mahdavi

19 April 2019 26	Tractor	0–1	Paykan	Tabriz
17:00 DST+04:30	Dejagah (yellow card) 59'; Imani (yellow card) 87'; Shojaei (yellow card) 90+5'	Report	Mousavi (yellow card) 31'; Momeni (yellow card) 39'; Alekasir 51'; Karimi (yellow card) 66'; Magno (yellow card) 74'	Stadium: Yadegar-e-Emam Stadium; Attendance: 40,000; Referee: Mooud Bonyadifar

26 April 2019 27	Zob Ahan	2–0	Tractor	Isfahan
19:00 DST+04:30	Mohammadzadeh 17' (pen.); Habibzadeh (yellow card) 82'; Derakhshan Mehr 90+4'	Report	Shojaei (yellow card) 46'	Stadium: Foolad Shahr Stadium; Attendance: 1,500; Referee: Seyed Hossein Zargar

1 May 2019 28	Tractor	1–1	Persepolis	Tabriz
17:00 DST+04:30	Imani (yellow card) 8'; Esmaeilifar 79'; Hajsafi (yellow card) 87'	Report	Resan (yellow card) 8'; Kamyabinia 11'; Beiranvand (yellow card) 44'; Torabi (yellow card) 64'; Mosleh (yellow card) 90+5'	Stadium: Yadegar-e-Emam Stadium; Attendance: 60,000; Referee: Mohammad Hossein Zahedifar

11 May 2019 29	Tractor	1–1	Pars Jonoubi Jam	Tabriz
21:30 DST+04:30	Salimi 22'; Imani (yellow card) 88'	Report	Seifollahi 78' (pen.)	Stadium: Yadegar-e-Emam Stadium; Attendance: 12,000; Referee: Reza Adel

16 May 2019 30	Foolad	2–2	Tractor	Ahvaz
21:30 DST+04:30		Report		Stadium: Foolad Arena

=== Hazfi Cup ===
14 September 2018 Round of 32	Sanat Naft	3–3 (a.e.t.) (4–3 p)	Tractor	Abadan
20:00 DST+04:30	Karrar 42', 92'; Balotelli 81'	Report	Stokes 45', 63' (yellow card) 86'; Esmaeilifar 58'	Stadium: Takhti Stadium; Attendance: 7,000; Referee: Bijan Heydari
	Penalties
	Karrar (penalty scored); Hakhamaneshi (penalty scored); Jahani (penalty scored); Balotelli (penalty scored); Barzay (penalty missed)		Stokes (penalty scored); Abdollahzadeh (penalty missed); Taheran (penalty scored); Pahlavan (penalty scored); Mehdipour (penalty missed)

== Statistics ==
=== Squad statistics ===
No.	Pos	Nat	Player	Total		Persian Gulf Pro League		Hazfi Cup	
No.	Pos	Nat	Player	Apps	Goals	Apps	Goals	Apps	Goals
1	GK	(Iran) IRN	Mohsen Forouzan	13	0	12	0	1	0
2	DF	(Iran) IRN	Mohammad Tayyebi	13	0	12	0	1	0
3	DF	(Iran) IRN	Reza Sharbati	6	0	5	0	1	0
5	DF	(Iran) IRN	Ali Abdollahzadeh	10	1	9	1	1	0
6	MF	(Iran) IRN	Alireza Naghizadeh	10	0	9	0	1	0
7	MF	(Iran) IRN	Masoud Shojaei	10	3	9	3	1	0
8	MF	(Iran) IRN	Ali Taheran	10	0	9	0	1	0
9	MF	(Iran) IRN	Mehdi Mehdipour	12	0	11	0	1	0
10	FW	(Iran) IRN	Ehsan Pahlavan	12	0	11	0	1	0
11	MF	(Iran) IRN	Danial Esmaeilifar	13	4	12	3	1	1
14	MF	(Iran) IRN	Yousef Seyedi	2	0	2	0	0	0
16	DF	(Iran) IRN	Mohammadreza Mehdizadeh	8	0	7	0	1	0
17	FW	(Iran) IRN	Mohammad Reza Azadi	2	0	2	0	0	0
19	FW	(Scotland) SCO	Lee Erwin	7	4	6	4	1	0
20	FW	(Iran) IRN	Reza Abdi	2	0	2	0	0	0
21	MF	(Iran) IRN	Ashkan Dejagah	9	1	8	1	1	0
22	GK	(Iran) IRN	Alireza Heidari	0	0	0	0	0	0
24	FW	(Japan) JPN	Yukiya Sugita	12	0	11	0	1	0
26	DF	(Iran) IRN	Ehsan Hajsafi	6	0	6	0	0	0
28	FW	(Ireland) EIR	Anthony Stokes	12	10	11	8	1	2
29	DF	(Iran) IRN	Iman Salimi	3	1	3	1	0	0
32	FW	(Iran) IRN	Hamed Hosseinalizadeh	1	0	1	0	0	0
33	GK	(Iran) IRN	Mahdi Mohammadian	0	0	0	0	0	0
40	DF	(Iran) IRN	Ali Esmaeili	1	0	1	0	0	0
70	MF	(Iran) IRN	Amir Reza Nasr Azadani	0	0	0	0	0	0
77	DF	(Iran) IRN	Mohammad Moslemipour	0	0	0	0	0	0
99	MF	(Iran) IRN	Ghaem Eslamikhah	0	0	0	0	0	0
Players transferred out during the season
4	DF	(Iran) IRN	Mohammad Ahle Shakheh	3	0	3	0	0	0
15	MF	(England) ENG	Harry Forrester	2	0	2	0	0	0

Last updated: 8 November 2018
Source: Competitions

=== Goalscorers ===
Rank	No.	Pos	Nat	Name	Pro League	Hazfi Cup	Total
1	28	FW	(Republic of Ireland)	Anthony Stokes	11	2	13
2	21	MF	(Iran)	Ashkan Dejagah	5	0	5
2	11	MF	(Iran)	Danial Esmaeilifar	4	1	5
4	19	FW	(Scotland)	Lee Erwin	4	0	4
5	7	MF	(Iran)	Masoud Shojaei	3	0	3
6	9	MF	(Iran)	Mehdi Mehdipour	2	0	2
6	24	FW	(Japan)	Yukiya Sugita	2	0	2
8	5	DF	(Iran)	Ali Abdollahzadeh	1	0	1
8	29	DF	(Iran)	Iman Salimi	1	0	1
8	6	MF	(Iran)	Alireza Naghizadeh	1	0	1
Own goal					2	0	2
Totals					36	3	39

Last updated: 30 March 2018

=== Clean sheets ===
Rank	No.	Pos	Nat	Name	Pro League	Hazfi Cup	Total
1	1	GK	(Iran)	Mohsen Forouzan	13	0	13

Last updated: 30 March 2019
