= List of Iranian football transfers summer 2018 =

Transfers of Iran Pro League from June to September of 2018

This is a list of Iranian football transfers for the 2018 summer transfer window. Transfers of Iran Pro League are listed. Transfer window was opened on June 13, 2018, and will be open until September 4, 2018, for players who played in Iranian clubs.

== Rules and regulations ==
According to Iran Football Federation rules for 2018–19 Iran Pro League, each Football Club is allowed to take up to maximum 6 new Iranian player from the other clubs who already played in the 2017–18 Iran Pro League season. In addition to these six new players, each club is allowed to take up to maximum 4 non-Iranian new players (at least one of them should be Asian) and up to 3 players from Free agent (who did not play in 2018–19 Iran Pro League season or doesn't list in any 2018–19 League after season's start) during the season. In addition to these players, the clubs are also able to take some new under-23 and under-21 years old players, if they have some free place in these categories in their player lists. Under-23 players should sign in transfer window but under-21 can be signed during the first mid-season. On 5 July 2018, a new rule was confirmed by Iran Football Federation which allows the clubs to move up to three players into their under-25 years old players list. These under-25 years old players must be under contract of the club in the previous season.

=== Players limits ===
The Iranian Football Clubs who participate in 2018–19 Iranian football different levels are allowed to have up to maximum 45 players in their player lists, which will be categorized in the following groups:

- Up to maximum 18 adult (without any age limit) players
- Up to maximum 3 under-25 players (i.e. the player whose birth is after 1 January 1994).
- Up to maximum 9 under-23 players (i.e. the player whose birth is after 1 January 1996).
- Up to maximum 15 under-21 players (i.e. the player whose birth is after 1 January 1998).

== Iran Pro League ==
=== Esteghlal ===
Manager: (Germany) Winfried Schäfer

==== In ====
Date	Player	From	Type	Ref
1 June 2018	(Iran) Morteza Aghakhan	(Iran) Paykan	Transfer	
3 June 2018	(Iran) Farshad Mohammadi	(Iran) Pars Jonoubi	Transfer	
3 June 2018	(Iran) Rouhollah Bagheri	(Iran) Khooneh be Khooneh	Transfer	
3 June 2018	(Iran) Mohammad Daneshgar	(Iran) Saipa	Transfer	
6 June 2018	(Iran) Sina Khadempour	(Iran) Naft Tehran	End of loan	
6 June 2018	(Iran) Sajjad Aghaei	(Iran) Aluminium Arak	End of loan	
12 June 2018	(Iran) Allahyar Sayyad	(Iran) Saipa	Transfer	
12 June 2018	(Iran) Meysam Teymouri	(Iran) Pars Jonoubi	Transfer	
12 June 2018	(Iran) Reza Azari	(Iran) Esteghlal U21	Transfer	
13 June 2018	(Iran) Amirhossein Esmaeilzadeh	(Iran) Peykan U19	Transfer	
16 July 2018	(Iran) Ali Karimi	(Iran) Sepahan	Transfer	
31 July 2018	(Iran) Morteza Tabrizi	(Iran) Zob Ahan	Transfer	
31 July 2018	(Germany) Markus Neumayr	(Turkey) Kasımpaşa	Transfer	
1 August 2018	(Iraq) Humam Tariq	(Iraq) Al-Quwa Al-Jawiya	Transfer	
8 August 2018	(Nigeria) Alhaji Gero	(Sweden) Östersunds	Transfer	

==== Out ====
Date	Player	To	Type	Ref
24 May 2018	(Brazil) Leandro Padovani Celin	Retired	End of contract	
6 June 2018	(Iran) Omid Noorafkan	(Belgium) Charleroi	Transfer	
19 June 2018	(Iran) Mohammad Javad Mohammadi	(Iran) Arvand Khorramshahr	Loan	
25 June 2018	(Iran) Miad Yazdani	(Iran) Sepidrood	Transfer	
27 June 2018	(Iran) Behnam Barzay	(Iran) Sanat Naft	Transfer	
10 July 2018	(Iran) Omid Ebrahimi	(Qatar) Al Ahli	End of contract	
26 July 2018	(Iran) Fardin Najafi	(Iran) Baadraan	Loan	
26 July 2018	(Uzbekistan) Server Djeparov	(Kazakhstan) Zhetysu	End of contract	
30 July 2018	(Iran) Majid Hosseini	(Turkey) Trabzonspor	Transfer	
8 August 2018	(Senegal) Mame Baba Thiam	(United Arab Emirates) Al-Ajman	Transfer	
16 August 2018	(North Macedonia) Bojan Najdenov	(Albania) KF Laçi	Transfer	
3 September 2018	(Iran) Ali Ghorbani	(Slovakia) Spartak Trnava	End of contract	

=== Esteghlal Khuzestan ===
Manager: N/A

==== In ====
Date	Player	From	Type	Ref
	(Iran) Vahid Hamdinejad	(Iran) Pars Jonoubi Jam	Transfer	

==== Out ====
Date	Player	To	Type	Ref
	(Iran) Vahid Sheikhveisi	(Iran) Paykan	Transfer	
	(Iran) Aghil Kaabi	(Iran) Sanat Naft	Transfer	
	(Iran) Meysam Doraghi	(Iran) Foolad	Transfer	
	(Iran) Goudarz Davoudi	Unattached	End of contract	

=== Foolad ===
Manager: (Iran) Sirous Pourmousavi

==== In ====
Date	Player	From	Type	Ref
	(Iran) Meysam Doraghi	(Iran) Foolad	Transfer	
20 June 2018	(Iran) Reza Mirzaei	(Iran) Sepahan	On loan	

==== Out ====
Date	Player	To	Type	Ref
	(Iran) Mohammad Ahle Shakheh	(Iran) Tractor	Transfer	
	(Iran) Rahim Zahivi	(Iran) Saipa	Transfer	
	(Iran) Abdollah Nasseri	(Iran) Saipa	Transfer	
	(Iran) Hamed Lak	(Iran) Nassaji	Transfer	
	(Iran) Ahmad Abdollahzadeh	(Iran) Sanat Naft	Transfer	

=== Gostaresh Foulad ===
Manager: (Iran) Firouz Karimi

==== In ====
Date	Player	From	Type	Ref

==== Out ====
Date	Player	To	Type	Ref

=== Naft Masjed-Soleyman ===
Manager: (Iran) Mahmoud Fekri

==== In ====
Date	Player	From	Type	Ref
	(Iran) Alireza Alizadeh	(Iran) Mes Kerman	Transfer	
	(Iran) Meysam Aghaei	(Iran) Pars Jonoubi	Transfer	
	(Iran) Milad Farahani	(Iran) Naft Tehran	Transfer	
14 June 2018	(Iran) Mahmoud Ghaed Rahmati	(Iran) Sepahan	Transfer	

==== Out ====
Date	Player	To	Type	Ref

=== Nassaji ===
Manager: (Iran) Javad Nekounam

==== In ====
Date	Player	From	Type	Ref
	(Iran) Mohammad Abshak	(Iran) Baadraan	Transfer	
	(Iran) Hamed Lak	(Iran) Foolad	Transfer	
	(Iran) Omid Singh	(Iran) Pars Jonoubi	Transfer	
	(Iran) Farshad Faraji	(Iran) Khooneh be Khooneh	Transfer	
	(Iran) Nima Mirzazad	(Iran) Malavan	Transfer	
	(Iran) Hamed Shiri	(Iran) Saipa	Transfer	
	(Iran) Hamidreza Divsalar	(Iran) Khooneh be Khooneh	Transfer	
	(Iran) Shahin Majidi	(Iran) Fajr Sepasi	Transfer	
	(Iran) Sajjad Ashouri	(Iran) Khooneh be Khooneh	Transfer	
	(Iran) Sajjad Heydari	(Iran) Mes Rafsanjan	Transfer	
	(Iran) Komeil Mohammadi	(Iran) Naft Tehran	Transfer	
	(Iran) Ali Asghar Ashouri	(Iran) Esteghlal Khuzestan	Transfer	

==== Out ====
Date	Player	To	Type	Ref

=== Padideh ===
Manager: (Iran) Yahya Golmohammadi

==== In ====
Date	Player	From	Type	Ref

==== Out ====
Date	Player	To	Type	Ref

=== Pars Jonoubi Jam ===
Manager: (Iran) Mehdi Tartar

==== In ====
Date	Player	From	Type	Ref

==== Out ====
Date	Player	To	Type	Ref
28 May 2018	(Iran) Iman Salimi	(Iran) Tractor	Transfer	
1 June 2018	(Iran) Mohsen Forouzan	(Iran) Tractor	Transfer	
3 June 2018	(Iran) Farshad Mohammadi	(Iran) Esteghlal	Transfer	
3 June 2018	(Iran) Mohammad Tayyebi	(Iran) Tractor	Transfer	

=== Paykan ===
Manager: (Iran) Majid Jalali

==== In ====
Date	Player	From	Type	Ref
30 May 2018	(Iran) Vahid Sheikhveisi	(Iran) Esteghlal Khuzestan	Transfer	
22 June 2018	(Iran) Mehdi Amini	(Iran) Sepahan	On loan	

==== Out ====
Date	Player	To	Type	Ref
22 May 2018	(Iran) Mehdi Shiri	(Iran) Persepolis	Transfer	
26 May 2018	(Iran) Payam Niazmand	(Iran) Sepahan	Transfer	
1 June 2018	(Iran) Morteza Aghakhan	(Iran) Esteghlal	Transfer	

=== Persepolis ===
Manager: (Croatia) Branko Ivanković

==== In ====
Date	Player	From	Type	Ref
18 April 2018	(Iran) Omid Alishah	(Iran) Tractor	Loan return	
22 May 2018	(Iran) Mehdi Shiri	(Iran) Paykan	Transfer	
30 June 2018	(Iran) Hamed Aghaei	(Iran) Naft Tehran	Loan return	
26 May 2018	(Iran) Mehdi Sharifi	(Iran) Sepahan	Transfer	
5 August 2018	(Iran) Saeed Karimi	(Iran) Naft Gachsaran	Transfer	
12 August 2018	(Iran) Mehdi Torabi	(Iran) Saipa	Transfer	
	(Iran) Soroush Rafiei	(Qatar) Al-Khor	Transfer	

==== Out ====
Date	Player	To	Type	Ref
14 May 2018	(Iran) Sadegh Moharrami	(Croatia) Dinamo Zagreb	Transfer	
4 July 2018	(Iran) Farshad Ahmadzadeh	(Poland) Śląsk Wrocław	Transfer	
21 July 2018	(Iran) Vahid Amiri	(Turkey) Trabzonspor	Transfer	
7 July 2018	(Iran) Mohsen Mosalman	(Iran) Zob Ahan	Transfer	
22 May 2018	(Iran) Mehdi Shiri	(Iran) Paykan	Loan	
7 July 2018	(Iran) Hamed Aghaei	(Iran) Oxin Alborz	Transfer	
12 August 2018	(Iran) Mehdi Torabi	(Iran) Saipa	Loan	
	(Iran) Soroush Rafiei	(Iran) Foolad	Loan	

=== Saipa ===
Manager: (Iran) Ali Daei

==== In ====
Date	Player	From	Type	Ref

==== Out ====
Date	Player	To	Type	Ref
22 May 2018	(Iran) Allahyar Sayyad	(Iran) Esteghlal	Transfer	
26 May 2018	(Iran) Ali Gholizadeh	(Belgium) Charleroi	Transfer	

=== Sanat Naft ===
Manager: (Portugal) Paulo Sérgio

==== In ====
Date	Player	From	Type	Ref

==== Out ====
Date	Player	To	Type	Ref

=== Sepahan ===
Manager: (Iran) Amir Ghalenoei

==== In ====
Date	Player	From	Type	Ref
26 May 2018	(Iran) Payam Niazmand	(Iran) Paykan	Transfer	
28 May 2018	(Iran) Mohammad Iranpourian	(Iran) Tractor	Transfer	
29 May 2018	(Brazil) Kiros Stanlley	(Iran) Zob Ahan	Transfer	
30 May 2018	(Iran) Sajjad Shahbazzadeh	Qatar SC	Transfer	
2 June 2018	(Iran) Shahab Adeli ^{U23}	(Iran) Naft Tehran	Transfer	
8 June 2018	(Iran) Khaled Shafiei	(Iran) Zob Ahan	Transfer	
14 June 2018	(Iran) Mehdi Kiani	(Iran) Tractor	Transfer	
30 June 2018	(Iran) Mohammad Karimi ^{U23}	(Iran) Khooneh be Khooneh	Transfer	
13 July 2018	(Iran) Davoud Rajabi ^{U23}	(Iran) Sepahan U21	Transfer	
13 July 2018	(Iran) Ali Khosravi ^{U23}	(Iran) Sepahan U21	Transfer	
15 July 2018	(Iran) Bakhtiar Rahmani	(Iran) Zob Ahan	Transfer	
1 August 2018	(Hungary) Vladimir Koman	(Turkey) Adanaspor	Transfer	

==== Out ====
Date	Player	To	Type	Ref
7 June 2018	(Iran) Masoud Hassanzadeh	(Iran) Zob Ahan	End of contract	
9 June 2018	(Iran) Mehdi Sharifi	(Iran) Persepolis	Released	
14 June 2018	(Iran) Mahmoud Ghaed Rahmati	(Iran) Naft Masjed Soleyman	Released	
14 June 2018	(Iran) Mohammad Ali Ahmadi	Unattached	End of contract	
20 June 2018	(Iran) Reza Mirzaei	(Iran) Foolad	On loan	
22 June 2018	(Iran) Mehdi Amini	(Iran) Paykan	On loan	
16 July 2018	(Iran) Ali Karimi	(Iran) Esteghlal	End of contract	
23 July 2018	(Albania) Edon Hasani	(Albania) KF Tirana	Released	
1 August 2018	(Iraq) Marwan Hussein	(Iraq) Al-Zawra'a	Released	
3 August 2018	(Iran) Saber Didehvar	(Iran) Naft va Gaz Gachsaran	Released	
5 August 2018	(Iran) Aref Gholami	(Iran) Zob Ahan	End of contract	
11 August 2018	(Iran) Mehdi Sedghian	(Iran) Sorkhpooshan Pakdasht	Released	
17 September 2018	(Syria) Ibrahim Alma	(Syria) Al-Wahda	End of contract	

=== Sepidrood ===
Manager: Khodadad Azizi

==== In ====
Date	Player	From	Type	Ref
4 July 2018	(Iran) Koroush Maleki	(Iran) Gostaresh Foolad	Transfer	
4 July 2018	(Iran) Mohsen Irannejad	(Iran) Oxin Alborz	Transfer	
7 July 2018	(Iran) Yaghoub Karimi	(Iran) Machine Sazi	Transfer	
8 July 2018	(Iran) Mohammad Reza Khorsandnia	(Iran) Nassaji	Transfer	
8 July 2018	(Iran) Reza Ma'ghouli	(Iran) Khooneh be Khooneh	Transfer	
6 August 2018	(Iran) Mehrdad Bayrami	(Iran) Esteghlal Khuzestan	Transfer	
27 August 2018	(Iran) Alireza Ezzati	(Iran) Naft Tehran	Transfer	
4 September 2018	(Iran) Mohammad Gholami	(Iran) Aluminium Arak	Transfer	
4 September 2018	(Iran) Hossein Shenani	(Iran) Mes Rafsanjan	Transfer	

==== Out ====
Date	Player	To	Type	Ref
25 July 2018	(Iran) Tohid Gholami	(Iran) Mashin Sazi	End of contract	
27 July 2018	(Iran) Mohammad Gholami	(Iran) Aluminium Arak	End of contract	
4 August 2018	(Iran) Mohsen Irannejad	Unattached	Released	
15 August 2018	(Iran) Mohammad Reza Khorsandnia	Unattached	Released	
28 August 2018	(Iran) Mohammad Lotfi	Unattached	Released	
28 August 2018	(Iran) Omid Samkan	Unattached	Released	
4 September 2018	(Iran) Reza Ma'ghouli	(Iran) Aluminium Arak	Transfer	

=== Tractor ===
Manager: (Wales) John Toshack

==== In ====
Date	Player	From	Type	Ref
1 June 2018	(Iran) Mohsen Forouzan	(Iran) Pars Jonoubi Jam	Transfer	
2 June 2018	(Iran) Mohammad Tayyebi	(Iran) Pars Jonoubi Jam	Transfer	
2 June 2018	(Iran) Alireza Naghizadeh	(Iran) Gostaresh Foolad	Transfer	
12 June 2018	(Iran) Ali Abdollahzadeh	(Iran) Sanat Naft	Transfer	
12 June 2018	(Iran) Mohammad Ahle Shakheh	(Iran) Foolad	Transfer	
3 July 2018	(Iran) Alireza Heidari	(Iran) Malavan	Transfer	
18 July 2018	(England) Harry Forrester	(Scotland) Rangers	Transfer	
19 July 2018	(Republic of Ireland) Anthony Stokes	(Greece) Apollon Smyrnis	Transfer	
25 July 2018	(Iran) Yousef Seyyedi	(Iran) Gostaresh Foolad	Transfer	
25 July 2018	(Iran) Hassan Farivar ^{U21}	(Iran) Tractor U21	Transfer	
29 July 2018	(Japan) Yukiya Sugita	(Sweden) Dalkurd FF	Transfer	
1 August 2018	(Iran) Ashkan Dejagah	(England) Nottingham Forest	Transfer	
1 August 2018	(Iran) Masoud Shojaei	(Greece) AEK Athens	Transfer	
14 August 2018	(Scotland) Lee Erwin	(Scotland) Kilmarnock	Transfer	

==== Out ====
Date	Player	To	Type	Ref
18 April 2018	(Iran) Omid Alishah	(Iran) Persepolis	End of loan	
30 May 2018	(Croatia) Šime Gregov	Unattached	End of contract	
30 May 2018	(Bosnia and Herzegovina) Sulejman Krpić	(Bosnia and Herzegovina) Željezničar Sarajevo	Transfer	
30 May 2018	(Iran) Hadi Mohammadi	(Iran) Zob Ahan	End of loan	
30 May 2018	(Iran) Fakher Tahami	(Iran) Sanat Naft	End of loan	
30 May 2018	(Iran) Aref Aghasi	(Iran) Foolad	End of loan	
28 May 2018	(Iran) Mohammad Iranpourian	(Iran) Sepahan	Transfer	
14 June 2018	(Iran) Mehdi Kiani	(Iran) Sepahan	Transfer	
14 July 2018	(Iran) Mohammad Naderi	(Belgium) KV Kortrijk	Transfer	
27 June 2018	(Iran) Mohammad Ebrahimi	(Iran) Oxin	Transfer	
30 June 2018	(Iran) Arsalan Motahari	Unattached	End of contract	
23 July 2018	(Iran) Farzin Garousian	(Iran) Esteghlal Khuzestan	Transfer	
27 July 2018	(Iran) Farzad Hatami	(Iran) Oxin	Transfer	

=== Zob Ahan ===
Manager: (Iran) Omid Namazi

==== In ====
Date	Player	From	Type	Ref
29 May 2018	(Iran) Hadi Mohammadi	(Iran) Tractor	Transfer	
7 June 2018	(Iran) Masoud Hassanzadeh	(Iran) Sepahan	Transfer	
7 June 2018	(Iran) Mohsen Mosalman	(Iran) Persepolis	Transfer	
7 June 2018	(Honduras) Eddie Hernández	Unattached	Transfer	
7 June 2018	(Brazil) Marion Silva Fernandes	Unattached	Transfer	

==== Out ====
Date	Player	To	Type	Ref
29 May 2018	(Brazil) Kiros Stanlley	(Iran) Sepahan	Transfer	
8 June 2018	(Iran) Khaled Shafiei	(Iran) Sepahan	Transfer	
15 July 2018	(Iran) Bakhtiar Rahmani	(Iran) Sepahan	Transfer	
