= List of Iranian football transfers winter 2018–19 =

This is a list of Iranian football transfers for the 2018–19 winter transfer window. Only transfers involving a team from the professional divisions are listed, including the 16 teams in the 2018–19 Persian Gulf Pro League and the 18 teams playing in the 2018–19 Azadegan League.

The winter transfer window opens on 6 January 2019, although a few transfers may take place prior to that date. The window closes at midnight on 3 February 2019 although outgoing transfers might still happen to leagues in which the window is still open. Players without a club may join teams, either during or in between transfer windows.

== Iran Pro League ==
=== Esteghlal ===
==== In ====
Date	Player	From	Type	Ref
1 December 2018	(Iran) Reza Karimi	(Albania) Skënderbeu Korçë	Transfer	
26 January 2019	(Guinea-Bissau) Esmaël Gonçalves	(Uzbekistan) Pakhtakor	Transfer	
30 January 2019	(Iran) Omid Noorafkan	(Belgium) Charleroi	Loan	
31 January 2019	(South Africa) Ayanda Patosi	(South Africa) Cape Town	Loan (with option to buy)	
5 February 2019	(Nigeria) Godwin Mensha	(Iran) Persepolis	Free Transfer	

==== Out ====
Date	Player	To	Type	Ref
16 December 2018	(Germany) Markus Neumayr	(Switzerland) Aarau	Transfer	
29 January 2019	(Iran) Jaber Ansari	(Iran) Paykan	Transfer	
25 February 2019	(Nigeria) Alhaji Gero	(Sweden) Östersunds	Transfer	

=== Esteghlal Khuzestan ===
==== In ====
Date	Player	From	Type	Ref

==== Out ====
Date	Player	To	Type	Ref

=== Foolad ===
==== In ====
Date	Player	From	Type	Ref

==== Out ====
Date	Player	To	Type	Ref
6 January 2019	(Iran) Soroush Rafiei	(Iran) Persepolis	End of loan	

=== Machine Sazi ===
==== In ====
Date	Player	From	Type	Ref
1 January 2019	(Iran) Ehsan Taeedi	(Iran) Pars Jonoubi	Transfer	
1 January 2019	(Iran) Reza Abdi	(Iran) Tractor Sazi	Transfer	
6 January 2019	(Iran) Yousef Seyyedi	(Iran) Tractor Sazi	Transfer	
6 January 2019	(Iran) Alireza Heidari	(Iran) Tractor Sazi	Transfer	
6 January 2019	(Iran) Milad Ghorbanzadeh	(Iran) Sepidrood	Transfer	

==== Out ====
Date	Player	To	Type	Ref
3 January 2019	(Brazil) Edson	(Brazil) CRB	Free	
6 January 2019	(Iran) Ahmad Mousavi	(Iran) Tractor Sazi	Transfer	
6 January 2019	(Iran) Peyman Babaei	(Azerbaijan) Sumgayit	Loans out	

=== Naft Masjed-Soleyman ===
==== In ====
Date	Player	From	Type	Ref
8 January 2019	(Iran) Mohammad Papi	(Iran) Sepahan	Loan	

==== Out ====
Date	Player	To	Type	Ref

=== Nassaji ===
==== In ====
Date	Player	From	Type	Ref

==== Out ====
Date	Player	To	Type	Ref

=== Padideh ===
==== In ====
Date	Player	From	Type	Ref

==== Out ====
Date	Player	To	Type	Ref

=== Pars Jonoubi Jam ===
==== In ====
Date	Player	From	Type	Ref

==== Out ====
Date	Player	To	Type	Ref

=== Paykan ===
==== In ====
Date	Player	From	Type	Ref

==== Out ====
Date	Player	To	Type	Ref
6 January 2019	(Iran) Mehdi Shiri	(Iran) Persepolis	End of loan	

=== Persepolis ===
==== In ====
Date	Player	From	Type	Ref
2 January 2019	(Iran) Mohammad Naderi	(Belgium) Kortrijk	Loan	
6 January 2019	(Iran) Mehdi Shiri	(Iran) Paykan	End of loan	
6 January 2019	(Iran) Mehdi Torabi	(Iran) Saipa	End of loan	
6 January 2019	(Iran) Soroush Rafiei	(Iran) Foolad	End of loan	
6 January 2019	(Iran) Saeed Karimi	(Iran)		
6 January 2019	(Croatia) Mario Budimir	(Croatia) Dinamo Zagreb		
6 January 2019	(Iran) Mehdi Sharifi	(Iran) Sepahan		

==== Out ====
Date	Player	To	Type	Ref
6 January 2019	(Iran) Hamidreza Taherkhani	(Iran) Sepidrood	Loan until 30 June 2019	
6 January 2019	(Iran) Ehsan Alvanzadeh	(Iran) Machine Sazi	Transfer	
6 January 2019	(Iran) Ahmad Baharvandi			
6 January 2019	(Iran) Shahin Abbasian			

=== Saipa ===
==== In ====
Date	Player	From	Type	Ref

==== Out ====
Date	Player	To	Type	Ref
6 January 2019	(Iran) Mehdi Torabi	(Iran) Persepolis	End of loan	

=== Sanat Naft ===
==== In ====
Date	Player	From	Type	Ref

==== Out ====
Date	Player	To	Type	Ref

=== Sepahan ===
==== In ====
Date	Player	From	Type	Ref
30 December 2018	(Iran) Mohammad Papi ^{U21}	(Iran) Fajr Sepasi	End of loan	
6 January 2019	(Iran) Mohammad Moslemipour ^{U23}	(Iran) Tractor Sazi	Released	
6 January 2019	(Iran) Ali Ghorbani	(Slovenia) Spartak Trnava	Transfer	
18 January 2019	(Iran) Mohammad Ebrahimi	(Iran) Gol Reyhan Alborz	Transfer	
22 January 2019	(Iran) Mohsen Mosalman	(Iran) Zob Ahan	Released	
29 January 2019	(Iran) Mohammadreza Mehdizadeh	(Iran) Tractor Sazi	Transfer	
30 January 2019	(Iran) Amir Hossein Nikpour	(Iran) Sepahan U21	Transfer	
30 January 2019	(Iran) Yasin Salmani	(Iran) Sepahan U21	Transfer	

==== Out ====
Date	Player	To	Type	Ref
8 January 2019	(Iran) Mohammad Papi ^{U21}	(Iran) Naft Masjed Soleyman	Loan	
29 January 2019	(Iran) Sasan Ansari	(Iran) Tractor Sazi	Transfer	
2 February 2019	(Iran) Davoud Rajabi ^{U23}	(Iran) Gol Reyhan Alborz	Loan	
2 February 2019	(Iran) Iman Zakizadeh ^{U23}	(Iran) Gol Reyhan Alborz	Loan	
2 February 2019	(Iran) Hossein Papi	Unattached	Released	

=== Sepidrood ===
==== In ====
Date	Player	From	Type	Ref
3 January 2019	(Iran) Payam Sadeghian	(Turkey) Osmanlıspor	Transfer	
8 January 2019	(Georgia (country)) Luka Nozadze	(Georgia (country)) Sioni	Transfer	
13 January 2019	(Iran) Amir Mansourian	(Iran) Padideh	Transfer	

==== Out ====
Date	Player	To	Type	Ref
6 January 2019	(Iran) Amin Manouchehri		Released	
18 December 2019	(Iran) Hossein Kaebi		Retired	

=== Tractor Sazi ===
==== In ====
Date	Player	From	Type	Ref
4 January 2019	(Guinea) Kevin Constant	(Switzerland) Sion	Transfer	
6 January 2019	(Iran) Ahmad Mousavi	(Iran) Machine Sazi	Transfer	
6 January 2019	(Iran) Mohammadreza Akhbari	(Iran) Saipa	Transfer	
29 January 2019	(Iran) Sasan Ansari	(Iran) Sepahan	Transfer	
2 February 2019	(Iran) Akbar Imani	(Iran) Sanat Naft	Transfer	

==== Out ====
Date	Player	To	Type	Ref
1 January 2019	(Iran) Reza Abdi	(Iran) Machine Sazi	Transfer	
1 January 2019	(Iran) Mohammad Moslemipour	(Iran) Sepahan	Transfer	
6 January 2019	(Iran) Yousef Seyyedi	(Iran) Machine Sazi	Transfer	
6 January 2019	(Iran) Alireza Heidari	(Iran) Machine Sazi	Transfer	
6 January 2019	(Iran) Amir Nasr Azadani	(Iran) Gol Reyhan Alborz	Transfer	
29 January 2019	(Iran) Mohammadreza Mehdizadeh	(Iran) Sepahan	Transfer	

=== Zob Ahan ===
==== In ====
Date	Player	From	Type	Ref

==== Out ====
Date	Player	To	Type	Ref
