= Tractor S.C. Academy =

- Full name: Tractor Sport Club Academy
- Ground: Takhti Stadium; Tractor Stadium
- Director: (Iran) Tractor S.C.
- Chairman: (Iran) Yaqub Vatani
- Head Coach: (Iran) Kazem Mahmoudi (U-21) (Iran) Hossein Hassandokht (U-19)
Home colours	Away colours	Third colours

Tractor Sports Club Academy are the youth team of Tractor Sports Club that was founded in 2011. Tractor Club Football Academy, the first academy in Iran that matches commands AFC started to work.

== Teams ==
Tractor Academy had 4 teams in the different ages, -14, -16, -19 and -21.

== Notable played in the adult team ==
1970s

- (Iran) Hassan Azarnia
- (Iran) Ahad Sheykhlari
- (Iran) Ayoub Zolfagari

1980s

- (Iran) Esmail Halali

1990s

- (Iran) Alireza Nikmehr
- (Iran) Hossein Khatibi
- (Iran) Ali Baghmisheh
- (Iran) Karim Bagheri
- (Iran) Sattar Hamadani
- (Iran) Younes Bahonar
- (Iran) Sirous Dinmohammadi
- (Iran) Abbas Aghaei
- (Iran) Mehdi Nouri

2000s

- (Iran) Mehdi Mohammadpouri
- (Iran) Abolfazl Hajizadeh
- (Iran) Bahram Dabbagh
- (Iran) Peyman Babaei
- (Iran) Saman Nariman Jahan
- (Iran) Masoud Ebrahimzadeh
- (Iran) Ebrahim Abednezhad
- (Iran) Mohammad Ali Ramezanian
- (Iran) Saeid Aghaei
- (Iran) Alireza Naghizadeh
- (Iran) Milad Ghamari
- (Iran) Mehran Gorbanpour
- (Iran) Ali Taheran
