= Ali Esmaeili =

Iranian football defender

Personal information
- Full name: Ali Esmaeili
- Date of birth: 19 December 1996 (age 29)
- Place of birth: Tabriz, Iran
- Height: 1.84 m (6 ft 0 in)
- Position: Right back

Youth career
- 2012–2016: Tractor

Senior career*
Years	Team	Apps	(Gls)
2014–2016	Tractor B	37	(5)
2016–2019	Tractor	1	(0)

International career^{‡}
2016–	Iran U23	0	(0)
- * Club domestic league appearances and goals as of 27 June 2018 ‡ National team caps and goals as of 12 March 2017

Ali Esmaeili (born 19 December 1996) is an Iranian football defender who last played for an Iranian club, Tractor in the Iran Pro League.
