= Danial Esmaeilifar =

Iranian footballer (born 1993)

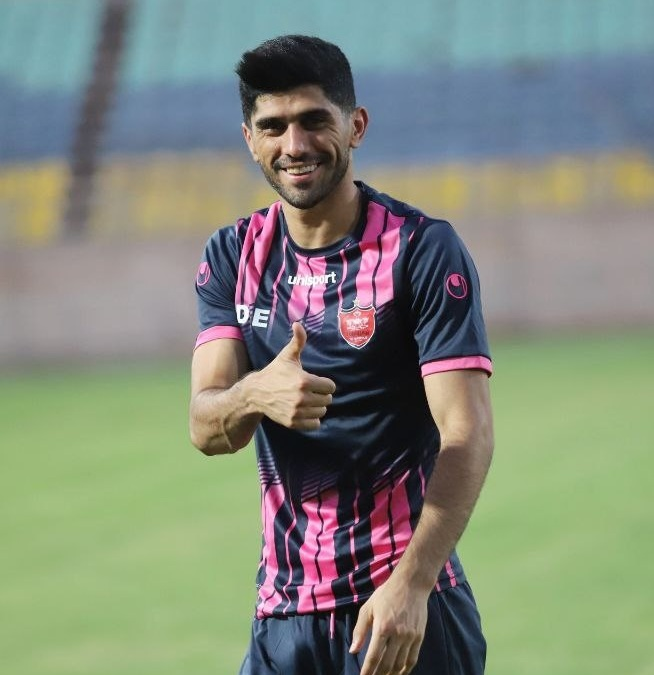
- Esmaeilifar in Persepolis in 2022

Personal information
- Date of birth: 18 March 1993 (age 33)
- Place of birth: Sari, Iran
- Height: 1.83 m (6 ft 0 in)
- Positions: Right back; right midfielder

Team information
- Current team: Tractor
- Number: 11

Youth career
- 2002–2012: Padideh Sari
- 2012–2014: Payam Sanat

Senior career*
Years	Team	Apps	(Gls)
2012–2014	Payam Sanat	22	(1)
2014–2020	Zob Ahan	105	(8)
2018–2019	→ Tractor (loan)	42	(7)
2020–2022	Sepahan	60	(9)
2022–2024	Persepolis	58	(5)
2024–	Tractor	52	(5)

International career^{‡}
2021–2025	Iran	6	(0)
- * Club domestic league appearances and goals as of 26 February 2026 ‡ National team caps and goals as of 31 March 2026

Danial Esmaeilifar (Persian: دانیال اسماعیلی فر; born 18 March 1993) is an Iranian footballer who plays for Iranian club Tractor in the Persian Gulf Pro League and the Iran national team.

== Club career ==
=== Payam Sanat Amol ===
He started his career in the Padideh Sari youth levels. After years in Padideye Sari Academy he joined Payam Sanat Amol in Division 3 and helped them gain promotion to Division 2. In his second season at Payam Sanat Amol he shone in the Hazfi Cup but he could not prevent Payam Sanat Amol's relegation.

=== Zob Ahan ===
After shining in a match against Zob Ahan in the Hazfi Cup he was admitted by Zob Ahan's scouts. Finally he joined Zob Ahan in summer 2014. He made his debut for Zob Ahan in their first fixture of the 2014–15 Iran Pro League against Saba Qom as a starter. He scored his first goal for the club on 10 April 2015 in a 1–1 draw against Esteghlal.

=== Tractor ===
In 2018–19 season he joined Tractor and played in 42 league matches for the team.

=== Sepahan ===
After good appearances in Zob Ahan, he joined Sepahan in summer of 2020.

=== Persepolis ===
On 8 June 2022, Esmaeilifar joined Persian Gulf Pro League side Persepolis on a two-year deal.

== Personal life ==
On 21 January 2026, while playing for Tractor against Mes Rafsanjan F.C., Esmaeilifar was one of three goal scorers, along with teammates Amirhossein Hosseinzadeh and Domagoj Drožđek, who refused to celebrate their goals in solidarity with the 2025–2026 Iranian protests.

== Career statistics ==
As of 14 April 2026

Club	Division	Season	League		Hazfi Cup		Asia		Total	
Club	Division	Season	Apps	Goals	Apps	Goals	Apps	Goals	Apps	Goals
Zob Ahan	Pro League	2014–15	13	3	1	0	—		14	3
Zob Ahan	Pro League	2015–16	25	1	4	0	7	1	36	2
Zob Ahan	Pro League	2016–17	29	0	4	0	6	0	40	0
Zob Ahan	Pro League	2017–18	14	1	1	0	0	0	15	0
Zob Ahan	Pro League	2019–20	21	3	2	1	2	0	25	4
Zob Ahan	Total		102	8	12	1	15	1	129	10
Tractor (loan)	Pro League	2017–18	12	2	1	0	5	0	18	2
Tractor (loan)	Pro League	2018–19	30	5	1	1	—		31	6
Tractor (loan)	Pro League	2024–25	30	3	1	0	8	0	39	3
Tractor (loan)	Pro League	2025–26	22	2	1	0	9+1	1+0	33	3
Tractor (loan)	Total		94	12	4	1	22+1	1+0	121	14
Sepahan	Pro League	2020–21	30	4	3	0	4	0	37	4
Sepahan	Pro League	2021–22	30	5	1	0	6	0	37	5
Sepahan	Total		60	9	4	0	10	0	74	9
Persepolis	Pro League	2022–23	30	2	5	0	—		35	2
Persepolis	Pro League	2023–24	28	2	2	1	6	0	36	3
Persepolis	Total		58	4	7	1	6	0	71	5
Career Total			314	33	27	3	53+1	2+0	395	38

- + other

== International career ==
He made his debut against Lebanon on 29 March 2022 in FIFA World Cup qualification

=== International ===
As of match played 31 March 2026

Appearances and goals by national team and year
National team	Year	Apps	Goals
Iran
Iran	2022	1	0
Iran	2025	4	0
Iran	2026	1	0
Total		6	0

== Honours ==
Payam Sanat Amol

- Football's 3rd Division (1): 2012–13

Zob Ahan

- Hazfi Cup (2): 2014–15, 2015–16
- Iranian Super Cup (1): 2016

Persepolis

- Persian Gulf Pro League (2): 2022–23, 2023–24
- Hazfi Cup (1): 2022–23
- Iranian Super Cup (1): 2023

Tractor

- Persian Gulf Pro League: 2024–25
- Iranian Super Cup: 2025
