= Ashkan Dejagah =

Iranian footballer (born 1986)

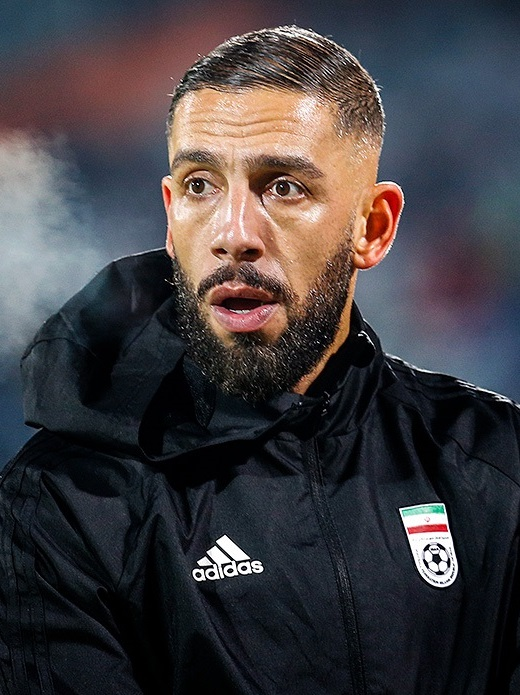
- Dejagah with Iran in 2018

Personal information
- Full name: Seyed Ashkan Dejagah
- Date of birth: 5 July 1986 (age 40)
- Place of birth: Tehran, Iran
- Height: 1.81 m (5 ft 11 in)
- Positions: Attacking midfielder; winger

Youth career
- –1999: Reinickendorfer Füchse
- 1999–2000: Tennis Borussia Berlin
- 2000–2004: Hertha BSC

Senior career*
Years	Team	Apps	(Gls)
2003–2007	Hertha BSC II	72	(23)
2004–2007	Hertha BSC	26	(1)
2007–2012	VfL Wolfsburg	132	(18)
2012–2014	Fulham	43	(5)
2014–2017	Al Arabi	45	(8)
2017	VfL Wolfsburg	0	(0)
2017	VfL Wolfsburg II	2	(0)
2018	Nottingham Forest	1	(0)
2018–2021	Tractor	62	(10)
2021–2022	Al Shahania	14	(7)
2022–2023	Foolad	20	(1)

International career
2002–2003	Germany U17	10	(4)
2003–2004	Germany U18	4	(2)
2004	Germany U19	11	(3)
2004–2005	Germany U20	5	(2)
2005–2009	Germany U21	20	(4)
2012–2019	Iran	59	(11)
Medal record
Men's football
Representing Germany
UEFA European Under-21 Championship
Winner	2009 Sweden
- * Club domestic league appearances and goals as of 18 May 2023

Seyed Ashkan Dejagah (Persian: سید اشكان دژآگه, born 5 July 1986) is an Iranian former professional footballer who played as a midfielder.

Dejagah made his professional debut for Hertha BSC in the 2004–05 Bundesliga season. In 2007, he joined VfL Wolfsburg, winning the Bundesliga in the 2008–09 season. In 2012, he joined Premier League side Fulham on a €2.5 million three-year deal.

Dejagah represented Germany at youth levels between 2001 and 2009, going on to win the 2009 UEFA European Under-21 Football Championship. He has played for the Iranian national team since 2011, helping them qualify for the 2014 World Cup, 2015 Asian Cup and the 2018 FIFA World Cup, although he did not play in the last. In 2015, Dejagah was voted by fans on Navad as Iran's best ever left midfielder.

== Early life ==
Dejagah was born in Tehran, Iran, and moved to Berlin, Germany, at the age of one. He became a German citizen at the age of 16. He played for German national youth teams from 2001 until 2009, winning the 2009 UEFA European Under-21 Football Championship.

== Club career ==
=== Hertha ===
Dejagah made his professional debut for Hertha BSC against VfL Bochum in the opening match of the 2004–05 Bundesliga season, playing the last five minutes in a 2–2 home draw in his only first team appearance that year, thus becoming the youngest player to ever play for the club since it was founded in 1892. In his three years at Hertha, he also played in the regional league. Despite starting out as a central defender, he was quickly moved to the forward position and finished as the team's top scorer in 2005–06, with twelve goals in 23 appearances. Hertha's manager, Falko Götz, showed continuous faith in Dejagah by gradually giving the youngster playing time in the Bundesliga, as well as three UEFA Cup showdowns in 2005–06, playing the following season in the Intertoto Cup against FC Moscow.

=== Wolfsburg ===
In 2007, Dejagah joined VfL Wolfsburg. In his first season at Wolfsburg, he showed himself as a talent by scoring eight goals and in his second season, he was a regular part of the Bundesliga winning team. In the 2009–10 season, after the selection of Armin Veh as club manager, he lost his place in the starting line up and he could not return to the starting team under Steve McClaren. With the return of Felix Magath, he found his form and in the 2011–12 season, he showed himself as a key player by scoring and assisting several goals for his club. After Dejagah stated a desire to join Fulham FC in order to fulfill his childhood dream of playing in the Premier League, Magath stated that he wanted Dejagah to stay at Wolfsburg; however, he later sided with the player's wishes to play at Fulham. Dejagah ended his career in the Bundesliga with 19 goals and 25 assists.

=== Fulham ===
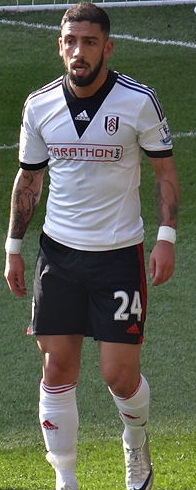
Dejagah playing for Fulham, 2014

==== 2012–13 season ====
On 31 August 2012, Dejagah joined Fulham on a three-year deal with an additional year's option, reportedly for €2.5 million, reuniting with his former Wolfsburg teammate Sascha Riether. He became only the third Iranian, after Andranik Teymourian and Karim Bagheri, to play in the Premier League. He made his league debut on 20 October, in a 1–0 home win against Aston Villa, coming off the bench for Fulham with 20 minutes remaining. He made his first start at Arsenal on 10 November, less than a month after his debut, in a 3–3 draw, while his first assist came on New Year's Day to Dimitar Berbatov in a 2–1 win at West Bromwich Albion.

==== 2013–14 season ====
Dejagah played his first game of the season for Fulham in a League Cup win over Burton Albion, and started his first league match of the season against Manchester United on 2 November. On 4 December, Dejagah scored his first goal for Fulham against Tottenham Hotspur in René Meulensteen's first game as manager. On 14 January, Dejagah scored a goal and provided an assist to Darren Bent in an FA Cup match against Norwich City. On 22 February, Dejagah scored at West Bromwich Albion in his manager's first game again, this time being Felix Magath, his former coach at Wolfsburg. On 15 March, Dejagah scored the winner against Newcastle United, eight minutes after coming on as a substitute, for his fourth Fulham goal. On 30 March, he scored a similar goal against Everton, cutting into his right foot and shooting from outside the 18-yard box. He was named the man of the match after scoring a goal against Hull City on 26 April. Dejagah was voted by fans as Fulham's player of the year at the end of the season.

=== Al-Arabi ===
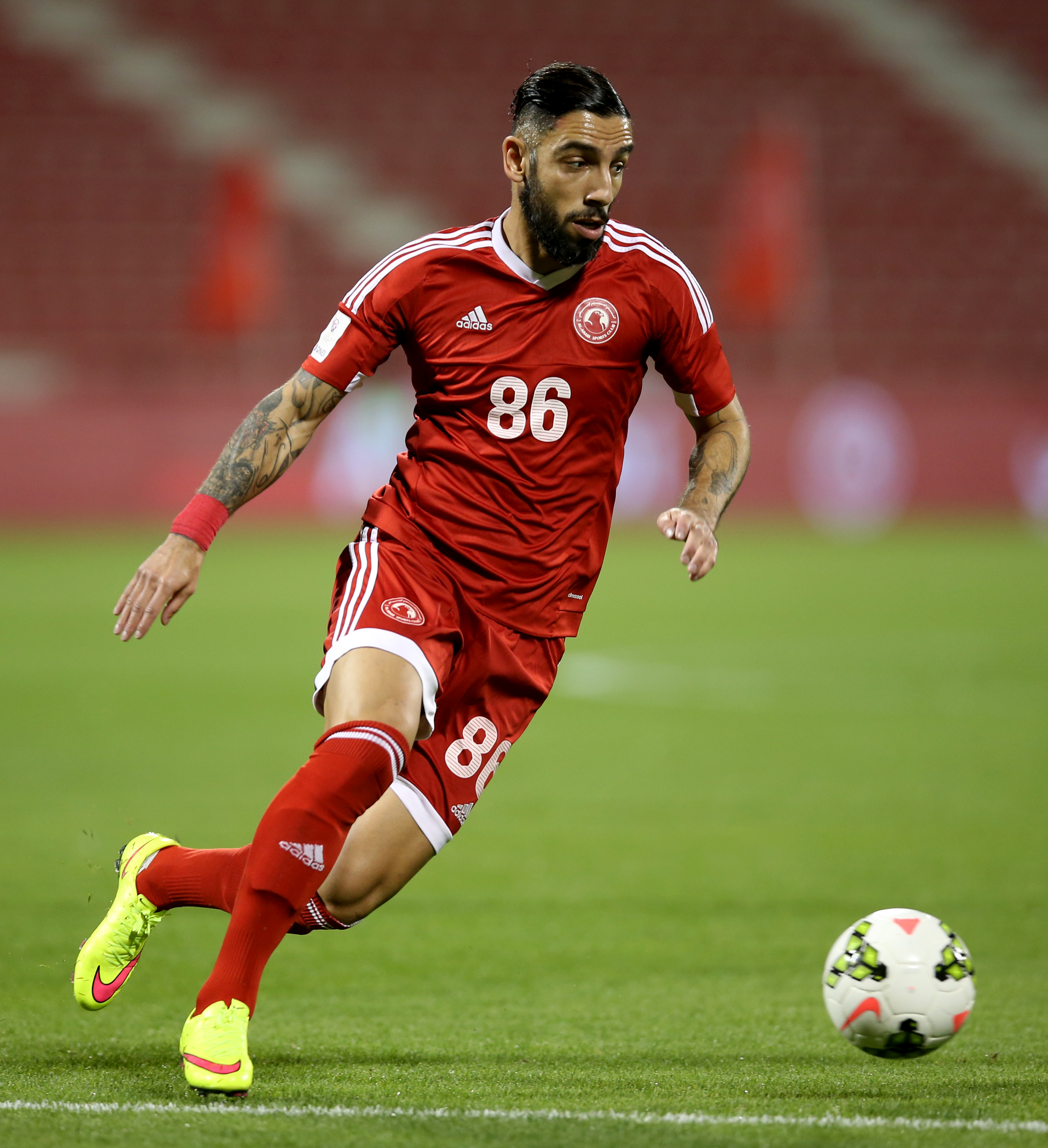
Dejagah playing for Al-Arabi, 2015

On 29 July 2014, Dejagah joined Qatari club Al-Arabi. In his first season with Al-Arabi, Dejagah scored 5 goals in 24 appearances and helped Al-Arabi to an eight place finish. Dejagah scored his first goal of the 2015–16 season on 9 December 2015 in Al-Arabi's 4–1 victory against Al-Mesaimeer. Dejagah was named as Al-Arabi's player of the season for 2015–16. Despite this, the new board members of the club sought to remove him from the squad. In July 2016 Dejagah was linked with loan moves to German club Hertha BSC and English club Watford.

After two years with Al Arabi, Dejagah was removed from the clubs squad on 16 September 2016. Al Arabi could not loan out Dejagah, and in January 2017, after not coming to an agreement with the club, Dejagah was released.

=== Return to Wolfsburg ===
On 30 January 2017, Dejagah signed with his former team VfL Wolfsburg on a six-month deal. He was given the shirt number 25. Shortly after joining Wolfsburg however, Dejagah suffered a hamstring injury and was sidelined for an extended period of time. Dejagah made his return to the pitch on 29 April 2017 with VfL Wolfsburg II. Playing 45 minutes in their 3–0 victory.

Dejagah made his competitive first team debut on 25 May 2017 in the first leg of the relegation play-off against Eintracht Braunschweig. He came on as a late substitute in the second half as Wolfsburg won the match 1–0. He also appeared in the return leg as a second-half substitute, a match that Wolfsburg again won 1–0. In June 2017, Wolfsburg announced that Dejagah would leave the club and would not be returning for the 2017–18 season.

=== Nottingham Forest ===
On 31 January 2018, Dejagah joined EFL Championship club Nottingham Forest on a short-term deal until the end of the 2017–18 season. He made his debut on 3 February against his former club Fulham appearing as a second-half substitute in a 2–0 defeat. On 14 February, Iran's coach Carlos Queiroz announced on his Facebook that Dejagah had gone through surgery.

He was released by Forest at the end of the 2017–18 season.

=== Tractor ===
On 2 August 2018, Dejagah signed a three-year contract with Tractor in the Iran Pro League.

== International career ==
=== Germany ===
In 2004, upon being called up to the German U-19 team, Dejagah scored seven goals in 15 international games, including two against the Netherlands after his team was down 2–0. In 2005, he was invited to play for Germany's U-21.

In October 2007, Dejagah refused to play an under-21 international match for Germany against Israel, in Tel Aviv. He cited "very personal reasons", and said, variously: "There are political reasons. Everyone knows I'm a German-Iranian", "I have more Iranian than German blood in my veins. Besides, I'm doing this out of respect. After all, my parents are Iranian"; and "I have nothing against Israel. But I'm worried about having problems later when travelling to Iran". Bild (Germany's top-selling newspaper), Ronald Pofalla and Friedbert Pflüger (the General Secretary and a leading member of the Christian Democratic Union), and Charlotte Knobloch (President of the Central Council of Jews in Germany) demanded that Dejagah be excluded from Germany's national team.

Dejagah said in a Stern interview that he chose not to play in Israel because, since the Iranian Revolution, Iranians travelling to Israel are subjected by the Iranian government to harsh punishments and several years in prison, and he had concern for his parents who travel to Iran and his other relatives who live in Iran. He also said he did not make his choice because of personal political, antisemitic, or racist reasons. Since the revolution, the Iranian government has warned Iranian athletes not to travel to Israel or compete against Israeli athletes.

After a meeting with Theo Zwanziger, the president of the German Football Association, and national technical director Matthias Sammer, Dejagah stated that his reason was that he was concerned because of his Iranian origins about the welfare of his family and relatives if he were to play in Israel; therefore, he was not excluded from Germany's national team. Zwanziger said, "He clearly stated that his request not to be nominated for the game in Israel had no racist or anti-Semitic background. He credibly assured us that, because of his Iranian origins, he had only been concerned with the well-being of his family and relatives." Zwanziger added that Dejagah was now prepared to play in the home tie against Israel if selected.

Seven years later, in April 2014, Dejagah spoke on the matter, saying, "This was a long time ago; it is in the past. Yes, it helped me grow up but now I only look to the future."

In 2009, Dejagah won the 2009 UEFA Euro U-21s with Germany and scored a goal in the group stages against Finland.

=== Iran ===
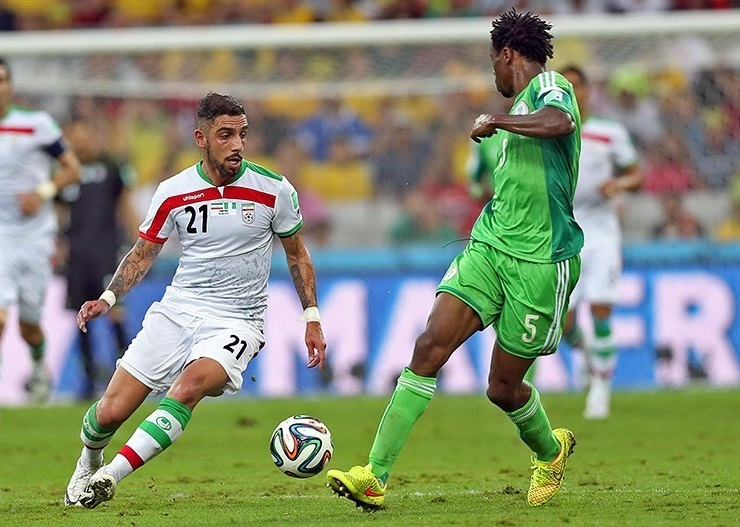
Dejagah in match for Iran against Nigeria at the 2014 FIFA World Cup.

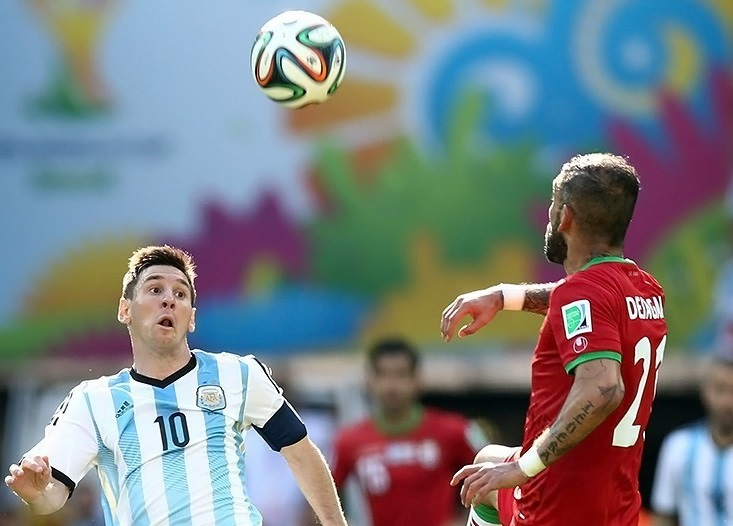
Dejagah playing for Iran against Lionel Messi and Argentina in 2014 World Cup

It had been suggested that Dejagah might play for Iran national team at the international level rather than Germany, but he said he never really considered it an option. Having played for Germany at the age of 21, he was originally no longer eligible to play for Iran. However, FIFA rule changes in July 2009 meant that he could play for Iran. In late December, Iran's coach Afshin Ghotbi approached Dejagah about playing for Iran at the 2011 AFC Asian Cup in Qatar, but he declined because he wanted to focus on playing first team football with his club VfL Wolfsburg instead.

On 21 September 2011, he was invited to the Iran national team by Carlos Queiroz. He scored twice on his debut for Iran against Qatar on 29 February 2012 in a World Cup qualifier. Upon qualification to the 2014 World Cup, his next international goals came on 15 and 19 November in Asian Cup qualifying wins over Thailand and Lebanon, sealing Iran's place in the 2015 Asian Cup as well. Dejagah was named in Iran's 2014 FIFA World Cup squad by Carlos Queiroz. He started for Iran in their opening match against Nigeria, but was substituted in the 73rd minute by Alireza Jahanbakhsh. He also played 85 and 68 minutes in the next matches against Argentina and Bosnia and Herzegovina, respectively. He was called into Iran's 2015 AFC Asian Cup squad on 30 December 2014 by Carlos Queiroz.

On 12 November 2015 after captain Andranik Teymourian was suspended, Dejagah captained the national team for the first time in his career and also scored in a 3–1 victory against Turkmenistan.

He was named in Iran's squad for the 2018 FIFA World Cup in Russia but did not feature in any matches as Iran was eliminated in the group stage.

On 26 December 2018, Dejagah was selected for Iranian squad for 2019 AFC Asian Cup. He started Iran's first match of the tournament and scored the second goal in a 5–0 win Yemen.

== Personal life ==
During his time with Fulham, Dejagah resided in London, England,he has tattoos with Berlin on one arm and Tehran on the other, and the phrase, "Never forget where you're from" on his neck.

In May 2014, Dejagah donated his DNA profile for scientific research on sports-related injuries and training.

On 18 January 2026, Dejagah publicly supported the 2025–2026 Iranian protests, saying: "For 100 hours, 90 million people have been fighting the world's most ruthless oppressors without any connection. With empty hands. No one has heard anything about them."

== Career statistics ==
=== Club ===
As of matches played on 1 March 2021

Appearances and goals by club, season and competition
Club	Season	League			National cup		Continental		Other		Total	
Club	Season	Division	Apps	Goals	Apps	Goals	Apps	Goals	Apps	Goals	Apps	Goals
Hertha BSC II	2003–04	Oberliga	16	2	—		—		—		16	2
Hertha BSC II	2004–05	Regionalliga Nord	22	6	1	0	—		—		23	6
Hertha BSC II	2005–06	Regionalliga Nord	23	12	—		—		—		23	12
Hertha BSC II	2006–07	Regionalliga Nord	11	3	—		—		—		11	3
Hertha BSC II	Total		72	23	1	0	—		—		73	23
Hertha BSC	2004–05	Bundesliga	1	0	1	0	—		—		2	0
Hertha BSC	2005–06	Bundesliga	3	0	0	0	3 (Note: Appearances in UEFA Cup)	0	—		6	0
Hertha BSC	2006–07	Bundesliga	22	1	2	0	1 (Note: Appearance in UEFA Intertoto Cup)	0	—		25	1
Hertha BSC	Total		26	1	3	0	4	0	—		33	1
VfL Wolfsburg	2007–08	Bundesliga	31	8	5	1	—		—		36	9
VfL Wolfsburg	2008–09	Bundesliga	27	3	4	1	7	0	—		38	4
VfL Wolfsburg	2009–10	Bundesliga	24	1	1	0	8 (Note: Appearances in UEFA Champions League and UEFA Europa League)	0	—		33	1
VfL Wolfsburg	2010–11	Bundesliga	23	3	0	0	—		—		23	3
VfL Wolfsburg	2011–12	Bundesliga	26	3	1	0	—		—		27	3
VfL Wolfsburg	2012–13	Bundesliga	1	0	0	0	—		—		1	0
VfL Wolfsburg	Total		132	18	11	2	15	0	—		158	20
Fulham	2012–13	Premier League	21	0	3	0	—		0	0	24	0
Fulham	2013–14	Premier League	22	5	2	1	—		1 (Note: Appearance in Football League Cup)	0	25	6
Fulham	Total		43	5	5	1	—		1	0	49	6
Al-Arabi	2014–15	Qatar Stars League	24	5	0	0	—		—		24	5
Al-Arabi	2015–16	Qatar Stars League	21	3	0	0	—		—		21	3
Al-Arabi	Total		45	8	0	0	—		—		45	8
VfL Wolfsburg	2016–17	Bundesliga	0	0	0	0	—		2 (Note: Appearances in Bundesliga Relegation play-offs)	0	2	0
VfL Wolfsburg II	2016–17	Regionalliga Nord	2	0	0	0	—		—		2	0
Nottingham Forest	2017–18	Championship	1	0	0	0	—		—		1	0
Tractor	2018–19	Iran Pro League	24	6	1	0	—		—		25	6
Tractor	2019–20	Iran Pro League	24	2	5	3	—		—		29	5
Tractor	2020–21	Iran Pro League	11	2	0	0	0	0	0	0	11	2
Tractor	Total		59	10	6	3	—		0	0	65	13
Career total			380	65	25	6	19	0	3	0	427	71

=== International ===
Statistics accurate as of match played 10 September 2019.

Appearances and goals by national team and year
National team	Year	Apps	Goals
Iran	2012	5	2
Iran	2013	5	2
Iran	2014	8	0
Iran	2015	13	2
Iran	2016	7	1
Iran	2017	6	1
Iran	2018	8	1
Iran	2019	7	2
Total		59	11

Scores and results list Iran's goal tally first, score column indicates score after each Dejagah goal.

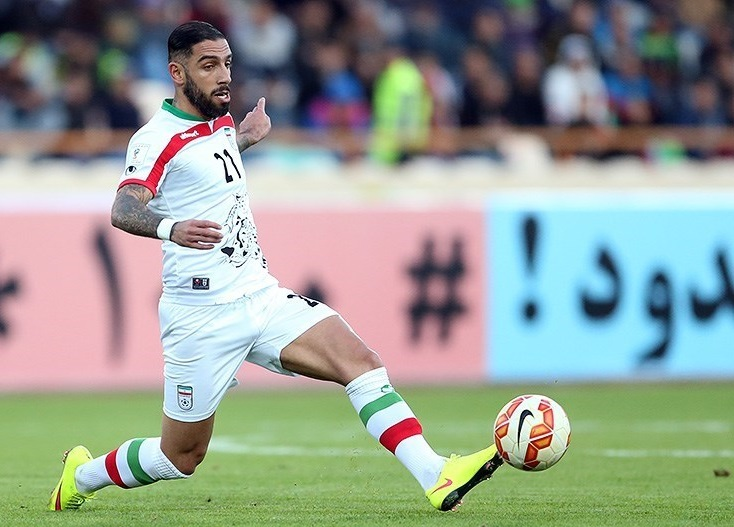
Dejagah on Iranian international duty against Turkmenistan in 2015; he scored his sixth Iran goal in this match.

List of international goals scored by Ashkan Dejagah
No.	Date	Venue	Opponent	Score	Result	Competition
1	29 February 2012	Azadi Stadium, Tehran, Iran	Qatar	1–0	2–2	2014 FIFA World Cup qualification
2	29 February 2012	Azadi Stadium, Tehran, Iran	Qatar	2–1	2–2	2014 FIFA World Cup qualification
3	15 November 2013	Rajamangala Stadium, Bangkok, Thailand	Thailand	1–0	3–0	2015 AFC Asian Cup qualification
4	19 November 2013	Camille Chamoun Sports City Stadium, Beirut, Lebanon	Lebanon	2–0	4–1	2015 AFC Asian Cup qualification
5	3 September 2015	Azadi Stadium, Tehran, Iran	Guam	1–0	6–0	2018 FIFA World Cup qualification
6	12 November 2015	Azadi Stadium, Tehran, Iran	Turkmenistan	3–1	3–1	2018 FIFA World Cup qualification
7	10 November 2016	Shah Alam Stadium, Shah Alam, Malaysia	Papua New Guinea	1–0	8–1	Friendly
8	9 November 2017	Liebenauer Stadium, Graz, Austria	Panama	1–0	2–1	Friendly
9	28 May 2018	Başakşehir Fatih Terim Stadium, Istanbul, Turkey	Turkey	1–2	1–2	Friendly
10	7 January 2019	Mohammed bin Zayed Stadium, Abu Dhabi, United Arab Emirates	Yemen	2–0	5–0	2019 AFC Asian Cup
11	20 January 2019	Mohammed bin Zayed Stadium, Abu Dhabi] United Arab Emirates	Oman	2–0	2–0	2019 AFC Asian Cup

== Honours ==
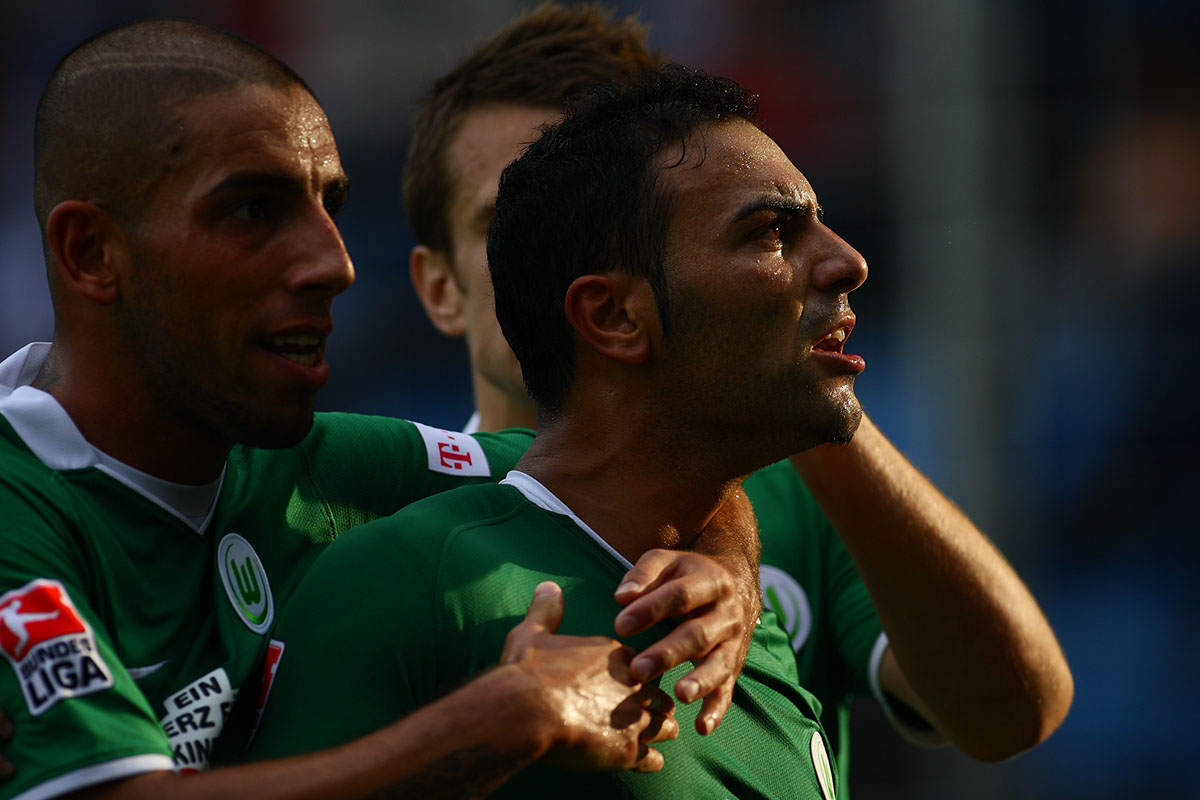
Dejagah celebrating with Mahir Sağlık and Zvjezdan Misimović after scoring a goal in the match against VfL Bochum, 24 August 2008

VfL Wolfsburg

- Bundesliga: 2008–09

Tractor

- Hazfi Cup: 2019–20

Germany U21

- UEFA European Under-21 Football Championship: 2009

Individual

- AFC Asian Cup Team of the Tournament: 2019

== See also ==
- German-Iranians
