= Hassan Farivar =

Iranian footballer

Personal information
- Date of birth: 7 February 1999 (age 27)
- Place of birth: Tabriz, Iran
- Height: 1.86 m (6 ft 1 in)
- Position: Midfielder

Youth career
- 2006–2012: Iranjavan
- 2012–2015: Shahin Bushehr
- 2015–2019: Tractor Sazi

Senior career*
Years	Team	Apps	(Gls)
2019–2020	Pars Jonoubi	0	(0)
2020–2021	Esteghlal Khuzestan	0	(0)
2021–2022	Shahin Bushehr	6	(0)
2022–2023	Khalij Fars	4	(0)
- * Club domestic league appearances and goals as of 23 May 2023

Hassan Farivar (born 7 February 1999) is an Iranian football midfielder.
