= Omid Samkan =

Iranian footballer

Personal information
- Full name: Omid Samkan
- Date of birth: 26 April 1996 (age 30)
- Place of birth: Kuhdasht, Iran
- Height: 1.87 m (6 ft 1 1/2 in)
- Position: Defender

Team information
- Current team: Palayesh Naft

Youth career
- –2015: Paykan
- 2015–2017: Niroye Zamini

Senior career*
Years	Team	Apps	(Gls)
2017–2020	Sepidrood Rasht	21	(0)
2019–2020	→ Khooneh be Khooneh (loan)	22	(0)
2020	Nirooye Zamini	6	(0)
2020–2021	Shahin Bushehr	24	(0)
2021–2022	Shahrdari Astara	13	(1)
2022	Kheybar Khorramabad	6	(0)
2022–2023	Chadormalou	25	(1)
2023–2024	Mes Shahr-e Babak	28	(0)
2024–2025	Palayesh Naft	29	(1)
2025–2026	Mes Shahr-e Babak	31	(4)
2026–	Palayesh Naft	1	(0)
- * Club domestic league appearances and goals

Omid Samkan (Persian: امید سامکن, born 26 April 1996) is an Iranian football defender, who plays for Palayesh Naft in Azadegan League.

== Club career ==
=== Sepidrood ===
He made his debut for Sepidrood Rasht in 6th fixtures of 2017–18 Persian Gulf Pro League against Sanat Naft Abadan.
