= Mohammad Tayyebi =

Iranian footballer

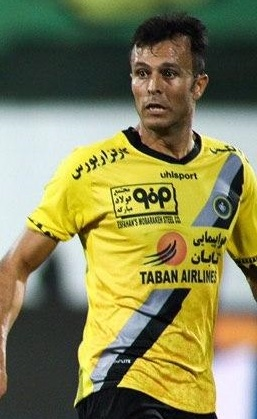

Personal information
- Date of birth: 11 September 1986 (age 40)
- Place of birth: Behbahan, Iran
- Height: 1.86 m (6 ft 1 in)
- Position: Centre back

Senior career*
Years	Team	Apps	(Gls)
2011–2012	Naft Omidiyeh		
2012–2017	Esteghlal Khuzestan	135	(6)
2017–2018	Qatar SC	11	(2)
2018	Pars Jonoubi	6	(0)
2018–2019	Tractor	26	(0)
2019–2020	Naft Masjed Soleyman	15	(1)
2020	Sepahan	12	(0)
2020–2023	Sanat Naft Abadan	78	(4)
2023–2024	Esteghlal Khuzestan	13	(1)
2024	Malavan	7	(0)

International career
2016	Iran	1	(0)
- * Club domestic league appearances and goals

Mohammad Tayyebi (Persian: محمد طیبی; born 11 September 1986) is an Iranian former footballer who played as a centre back.

== Club career ==
=== Esteghlal Khuzestan ===
Tayyebi joined Esteghlal Khuzestan in summer 2012. He was part of Esteghlal Khuzestan in their promotion to the Persian Gulf Pro League. He was one of few players that remained in Esteghlal Khuzestan squad after promotion, mostly utilized as right back and centre back.

=== Qatar ===
On 20 July 2017, Tayyebi signed with Qatar SC.

== Club career statistics ==
As of 31 May 2018.

Club	Division	Season	League		Hazfi Cup		Asia		Total	
Club	Division	Season	Apps	Goals	Apps	Goals	Apps	Goals	Apps	Goals
Esteghlal; Khuzestan	Azadegan League	2012–13	25	1	–	–	–	–	25	1
Esteghlal; Khuzestan	Persian Gulf Pro League	2013–14	27	1	1	0	–	–	28	1
Esteghlal; Khuzestan	Persian Gulf Pro League	2014–15	30	1	2	0	–	–	32	1
Esteghlal; Khuzestan	Persian Gulf Pro League	2015–16	28	1	1	0	–	–	29	1
Esteghlal; Khuzestan	Persian Gulf Pro League	2016–17	25	2	0	0	8	0	33	2
Esteghlal; Khuzestan	Total		135	6	4	0	8	0	147	6
Qatar SC	Qatar Stars League	2017–18	10	2	0	0	0	0	10	2
Pars Jonoubi	Persian Gulf Pro League	2017–18	6	0	–	–	–	–	6	0
Tractor	Persian Gulf Pro League	2018–19	0	0	0	0	–	–	0	0
Naft Masjed Soleyman	Persian Gulf Pro League	2019–20	16	1	1	0	–	–	17	1
Sepahan	Persian Gulf Pro League	2019–20	12	0	1	0	2	0	15	0
Sanat	Persian Gulf Pro League	2020-21	28	2	2	0	0	0	30	2
Naft MIS	Persian Gulf Pro League	2021-22	2	0	0	0	0	0	2	0
Sanat	Persian Gulf Pro League	2021-22	17	1	1	0	0	0	18	1
Sanat	Persian Gulf Pro League	2022-23	29	1	1	0	0	0	30	1
Sanat	Total		46	2	2	0	0	0	48	2
Esteghlal kh	Persian Gulf Pro League	2023-24	13	1	0	0	0	0	13	1
Malavan	Persian Gulf Pro League	2023-24	7	0	1	0	0	0	8	0
Career totals			275	14	11	0	10	0	296	14

== International career ==
He made his debut on 7 June 2016 against Kyrgyzstan in Azadi Stadium in Tehran in a Friendly.

== Honours ==
Esteghlal Khuzestan

- Persian Gulf Pro League (1): 2015–16
- Iranian Super Cup runner-up: 2016
