= Ali Taheran =

Iranian footballer

Personal information
- Full name: Ali Taheran
- Date of birth: 7 April 1997 (age 29)
- Place of birth: Tabriz, Iran
- Height: 1.87 m (6 ft 2 in)
- Position: Defensive midfielder

Team information
- Current team: Sanat Naft Abadan
- Number: 6

Youth career
- 2013–2016: Tractor

Senior career*
Years	Team	Apps	(Gls)
2016–2019	Tractor	35	(0)
2019	Gol Gohar	0	(0)
2020–2022	Shahr Khodro	42	(1)
2023–2026	Chadormalou	82	(6)
2026–	Sanat Naft	25	(2)

International career^{‡}
2016–2019	Iran U20	5	(0)
- * Club domestic league appearances and goals as of 17 June 2019 ‡ National team caps and goals as of 17 January 2019

Ali Taheran (born April 7, 1997) is an Iranian footballer who plays as a midfielder in Persian Gulf Pro League club Sanat Naft.

== Club career statistics ==
Club	Division	Season	League		Hazfi Cup		Asia		Total	
Club	Division	Season	Apps	Goals	Apps	Goals	Apps	Goals	Apps	Goals
Tractor	PGL	2016–17	4	0	1	0	–	–	5	0
Tractor	PGL	2017–18	20	0	2	0	4	–	26	0
Career total			24	0	3	0	4	0	31	0

== Honors ==
Tractor

- Shohada Cup (1): 2017
