= Mohammad Ahle Shakheh =

Iranian Football Defender

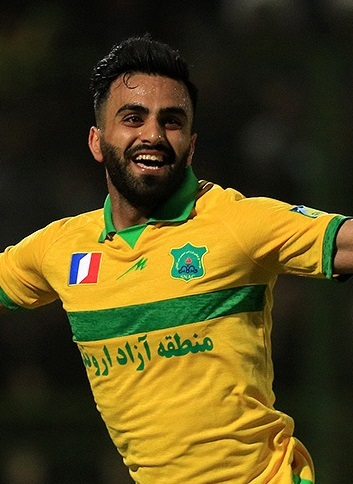

Personal information
- Date of birth: 14 June 1993 (age 33)
- Place of birth: Ahvaz, Iran
- Height: 1.86 m (6 ft 1 in)
- Position: Centre back

Team information
- Current team: Esteghlal Khuzestan
- Number: 44

Youth career
- –2011: Naft Ahvaz
- 2011–2014: Foolad

Senior career*
| Years | Team | Apps | (Gls) |
| 2014–2018 | Foolad | 31 | (2) |
| 2018 | Tractor | 3 | (0) |
| 2018–2019 | Machine Sazi | 18 | (1) |
| 2019–2022 | Sanat Naft | 50 | (3) |
| 2023–2024 | Esteghlal Mollasani | 16 | (0) |
| 2024–2025 | Palayesh Naft | 26 | (4) |
| 2025– | Esteghlal Khuzestan | 16 | (0) |
- * Club domestic league appearances and goals as of 16 April 2025

Mohammad Ahle Shakheh (Persian: محمد اهل شاخه; born 14 June 1993) is an Iranian football defender who plays for Esteghlal Khuzestan in the Persian Gulf Pro League.

== Club career ==
=== Foolad ===
Ahleh Shakheh started his career with Foolad, from youth levels. He promoted to Foolad first team in summer 2014 by Dragan Skočić and signed three-years contract which keeping him until 2017 at Foolad. He made his professional debut against Zob Ahan on 15 September 2015 as a starter.

=== Tractor ===
On 12 June 2018, Ahleh Shakheh signed a 3 years contract with Tractor.

== Club career statistics ==
As of 15 September 2015.

| Club | Division | Season | League | | Hazfi Cup | | Asia | | Total | |
| Club | Division | Season | Apps | Goals | Apps | Goals | Apps | Goals | Apps | Goals |
|---|---|---|---|---|---|---|---|---|---|---|
| Foolad | Pro League | 2014–15 | 0 | 0 | 0 | 0 | 0 | 0 | 0 | 0 |
| Foolad | Pro League | 2015–16 | 20 | 2 | 1 | 0 | – | – | 21 | 2 |
| Foolad | Pro League | 2016-17 | 11 | 0 | 2 | 0 | 0 | 0 | 13 | 0 |
| Foolad | Total | | 31 | 2 | 3 | 0 | 0 | 0 | 34 | 2 |
| Tractor | Persian Gulf Pro League | 2018-19 | 3 | 0 | 0 | 0 | 0 | 0 | 3 | 0 |
| Machine Sazi | Persian Gulf Pro League | 2018-19 | 18 | 1 | 1 | 0 | 0 | 0 | 19 | 1 |
| Sanat | Persian Gulf Pro League | 2019-20 | 27 | 2 | 2 | 2 | 0 | 0 | 29 | 4 |
| Sanat | Persian Gulf Pro League | 2020-21 | 23 | 1 | 1 | 0 | 0 | 0 | 24 | 1 |
| Sanat | Total | | 50 | 3 | 3 | 2 | 0 | 0 | 53 | 5 |
| Esteghlal Mollasani | Azadegan League | 2023-24 | 10 | 0 | 1 | 0 | 0 | 0 | 11 | 0 |
| Career totals | | | 112 | 6 | 8 | 2 | 0 | 0 | 120 | 8 |
