= Yukiya Sugita =

Japanese footballer

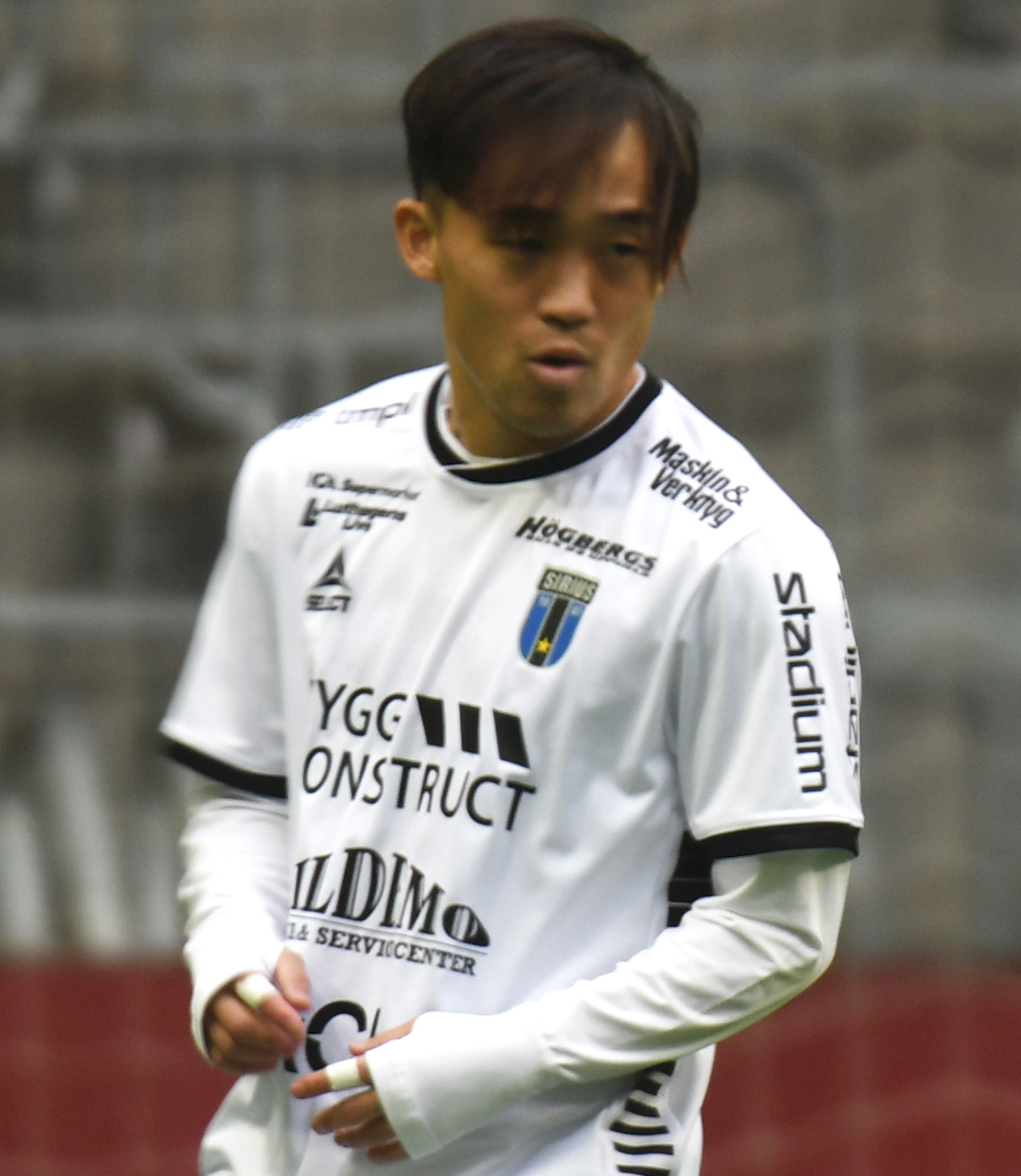
- Sugi playing for IK Sirius in 2020

Personal information
- Date of birth: 22 April 1993 (age 33)
- Place of birth: Saitama, Japan
- Height: 1.66 m (5 ft 5 in)
- Position: Winger

Team information
- Current team: Gefle
- Number: 20

Youth career
- 2009–2011: Kashiwa Reysol
- 2011–2012: Sendai University

Senior career*
Years	Team	Apps	(Gls)
2013	Jove Español B	10	(1)
2013	Jove Español	11	(1)
2013–2016	Hércules	29	(2)
2016–2017	Pattaya United	9	(1)
2016	→ PTT Rayong (loan)	13	(2)
2017–2018	Dalkurd FF	36	(5)
2018–2020	Tractor	37	(3)
2020	→ IK Sirius (loan)	17	(5)
2020–2022	IK Sirius	69	(8)
2023	Foolad	1	(0)
2023	Arar	0	(0)
2024	Gyeongnam FC	1	(0)
2024–2025	Nordic United	28	(7)
2025–	Gefle	33	(1)
- * Club domestic league appearances and goals as of 16 November 2026

Yukiya Sugita (杉田 祐希也, Sugita Yukiya; born 22 April 1993), commonly known as a Sugi, is a Japanese footballer who plays as a winger for Swedish Ettan Norra club Gefle.

== Club career ==
=== Early career and stint in Spain ===
Sugi was born in Saitama, and joined Kashiwa Reysol's youth setup in 2009, aged 16. In the 2011 summer the Spanish agent Javier Subirats decided to represent him, after a friendly match between Kashiwa and Elche's reserves.

However, after failing to join the Valencians, Sugi returned to Japan to play for Sendai University until October 2012, when Gaspar Campillo, coach and sporting director of Jove Español San Vicente, decided to sign him after positive reports written by Subirats. He signed an 18-month deal with the Valencian side, but due to bureaucratic problems, was unable to play with the main squad in the Tercera División, and was assigned to the B-team in the regional levels.

After Jove Español's assignment as a farm team of Hércules, Sugi was called up to the latter's first team by manager Quique Hernández. He played his first match as a professional on 11 September 2013, replacing Quique de Lucas in the 56th minute of a 2–0 home win against Real Murcia in the season's Copa del Rey, becoming the first Asian to play for Hércules.

Sugi made his league debut on 17 November 2013, again from the bench in a 2–4 loss at Córdoba in the Segunda División, and scored his first professional goal seven days later, netting the last of a 3–0 home success against Sabadell. On 22 December 2013, he renewed his link with the Valencian side, signing a three-and-a-half-year contract with a €10 million release clause, being definitely promoted to the main squad.

=== Thailand ===
He left Hércules in 2015, moving to Thailand playing for Pattaya United and PTT Rayong.

=== Dalkurd FF ===
On 21 February 2017, Sugita signed a two-year deal with Dalkurd FF in Superettan, Sweden's second tier. Dalkurd won a promotion to Allsvenskan the same season.

In 2018, Sugita established himself as a key player at Dalkurd, although the club struggled in the league and was placed at the foot of the table mid through the season.

=== Tractor S.C. ===
On 29 July 2018, Sugita signed a three-year contract with Tractor in the Iran Pro League.

=== IK Sirius ===
In March 2020 he joined the Swedish Allsvenskan team IK Sirius on a short-term loan. On 22 July 2020, the loan was extended 31 August. The loan extension was made after the Persian Gulf Pro League was delayed until late September.

=== Arar ===
On 26 August 2023, Sugita joined Saudi Second Division club Arar.
