= Ali Abdollahzadeh =

Iranian footballer

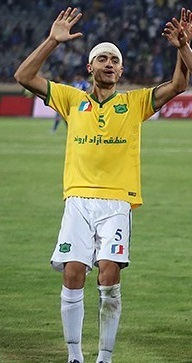
- Abdollahzadeh playing for Sanat Naft

Personal information
- Date of birth: 4 January 1993 (age 33)
- Place of birth: Abadan, Iran
- Height: 1.89 m (6 ft 2 in)
- Positions: Centre back; right back

Team information
- Current team: Sanat Naft
- Number: 5

Youth career
- 2010–2014: Sanat Naft

Senior career*
Years	Team	Apps	(Gls)
2014–2018	Sanat Naft	92	(6)
2018–2019	Tractor	11	(1)
2019–2020	Pars Jonoubi	23	(2)
2020–2021	Sanat Naft	4	(0)
2021	Paykan	3	(0)
2021–2023	Naft Masjed Soleyman	23	(0)
2023–2024	Kheybar	10	(0)
2024–	Sanat Naft	2	(0)

International career^{‡}
2014–2016	Iran U23	11	(1)
- * Club domestic league appearances and goals as of 21 April 2025 ‡ National team caps and goals as of 22 January 2016

Ali Abdollahzadeh (Persian: علی عبد الله زاده; born 4 January 1993) is an Iranian footballer who plays for Sanat Naft as a defender.

== Career ==
=== Tractor ===
On 12 June 2018, Abdollahzadeh signed a three-year contract with Tractor.

== Club career statistics ==
As of 7 April 2015.

Club	Division	Season	League		Hazfi Cup		Asia		Total	
Club	Division	Season	Apps	Goals	Apps	Goals	Apps	Goals	Apps	Goals
Sanat Naft	Azadegan League	2014–15	19	1	0	0	-		19	1
Sanat Naft	Azadegan League	2015–16	24	2	0	0	-		24	2
Sanat Naft	Iran Pro League	2016–17	32	2	2	0	-		32	2
Sanat Naft	Iran Pro League	2017–18	21	1	0	0	-		21	1
Tractor	Iran Pro League	2018–19	6	1	0	0	-		6	1
Career totals			102	7	2	0	0	0	104	7
