= Amir Reza Nasr Azadani =

Iranian footballer (born 1996)

Amir Nasr Azadani
Personal information
- Full name: Amir Reza Nasr Azadani
- Date of birth: 7 February 1996 (age 30)
- Place of birth: Isfahan, Iran
- Height: 1.79 m (5 ft 10 in)
- Position: Defender

Youth career
- 2012–2015: Sepahan

Senior career*
Years	Team	Apps	(Gls)
2015–2016	Rah Ahan	3	(0)
2016–2018	Tractor	14	(2)
- * Club domestic league appearances and goals as of 20 December 2018

Amir Reza Nasr Azadani (Persian: امیررضا نصرآزادانی; born 7 February 1996) is an Iranian footballer who last played as a defender for Persian Gulf Pro League club Tractor. He was sentenced to 26 years in prison in Iran following the protests in the country about the death of Mahsa Amini while in the custody of Iran's morality police.

== Imprisonment ==
Nasr Azadani was arrested in November 2022 during the Mahsa Amini protests, allegedly in connection with the deaths of a police officer and two Basij militia members. He was accused of Moharebeh ("Waging War Against God"), a crime punishable by death in Iran. The Islamic Republic has executed two other Iranian men, Mohsen Shekari and Majidreza Rahnavard, both charged with the same crime for their participation in the Mahsa Amini protests on 8 and 12 December 2022, respectively.

Following his arrest, according to IranWire, relatives reported being threatened: security forces allegedly said that if the family refused to keep Nasr Azadani's arrest quiet, then Nasr Azadani would be given the most severe sentence. VoA-affiliated Polygraph.info expressed skepticism of the murder allegations against Nasr Azadani, given the Iranian state's alleged history of "sham trials", and given IranWire reports of alleged coercion. Iranian authorities stated the sentence was provisional "pending further investigation by a Revolutionary Court".

Reacting to the news of the sentence on 12 December, FIFPRO, the world-wide union of footballers, said it was "shocked and sickened" and called for "immediate removal of his punishment". Nasr Azadani has been charged with rioting against authorities but no sentence has been issued yet and it remains unclear when his trial is set to begin. A petition to stop the execution was raised on the protest site Change.org, and it has over 2 million signatures.

On 9 January 2023, Nasr Azadani was sentenced to 26 years in prison, 16 for the crime of partaking in enmity against God, and 10 years for 2 other crimes committed during the protests.

== Club career ==
Nasr Azadani joined Rah Ahan in 2015, after spending his youth career at Sepahan. He played for the Persian Gulf Pro League with the Tractor team but has not played professionally since his last appearance in November 2017.

== Career statistics ==
Club	Season	League			Cup		Continental		Total	
Club	Season	Division	Apps	Goals	Apps	Goals	Apps	Goals	Apps	Goals
Rah Ahan	2015–16	Persian Gulf Pro League	3	0	0	0	0	0	3	0
Tractor	2016–17	Persian Gulf Pro League	1	0	0	0	0	0	1	0
Tractor	2017–18	Persian Gulf Pro League	13	2	0	0	0	0	13	2
Career total			17	2	0	0	0	0	17	2

== Honours ==
Tractor

- Shohada Cup: 2017
