= Hossein Shenani =

Iranian footballer (born 1993)

Personal information
- Full name: Hossein Mojalli Shananizadeh
- Date of birth: 11 December 1993 (age 32)
- Place of birth: Abadan, Iran
- Height: 1.78 m (5 ft 10 in)
- Position: Winger

Team information
- Current team: Kheybar Khorramabad
- Number: 11

Youth career
- 2011–2014: Mes Kerman

Senior career*
Years	Team	Apps	(Gls)
2014–2015	Foolad Novin	8	(0)
2015–2017	Malavan	42	(5)
2017–2018	Mes Rafsanjan	2	(1)
2018–2019	Sepidrood	15	(2)
2019–2020	Mes Kerman	27	(5)
2020–2022	Zob Ahan	44	(1)
2022–2023	Naft M.I.S	24	(2)
2023–2025	Sanat Naft	52	(9)
2025–2026	Nassaji Mazandaran	31	(2)
2026–	Kheybar Khorramabad	8	(1)
- * Club domestic league appearances and goals as of 7 December 2025

Hossein Mojalli Shananizadeh, known as Hossein Shenani (Persian: حسین شنانی; born 11 December 1993) is an Iranian football forward who plays for Kheybar Khorramabad in Persian Gulf Pro League.

== Club career ==
Shenani started his career with Foolad from youth levels. He moved to Foolad Novin in 2014. In summer of 2015, he joined Malavan. He made his professional debut against Foolad on 31 October 2015 as a substitute for Mohammad Razipour.

== Club career statistics ==
As of 31 October 2015.

Club	Division	Season	League		Hazfi Cup		Asia		Total	
Club	Division	Season	Apps	Goals	Apps	Goals	Apps	Goals	Apps	Goals
Foolad Novin	Division 1	2014–15	7	0	0	0	–	–	7	0
Malavan	Pro League	2015–16	1	0	0	0	–	–	1	0
Career totals			8	0	0	0	0	0	8	0

== Honours ==
=== Club ===
Foolad Novin

- Azadegan League (1): 2014–15
