= Mohsen Forouzan =

Iranian footballer

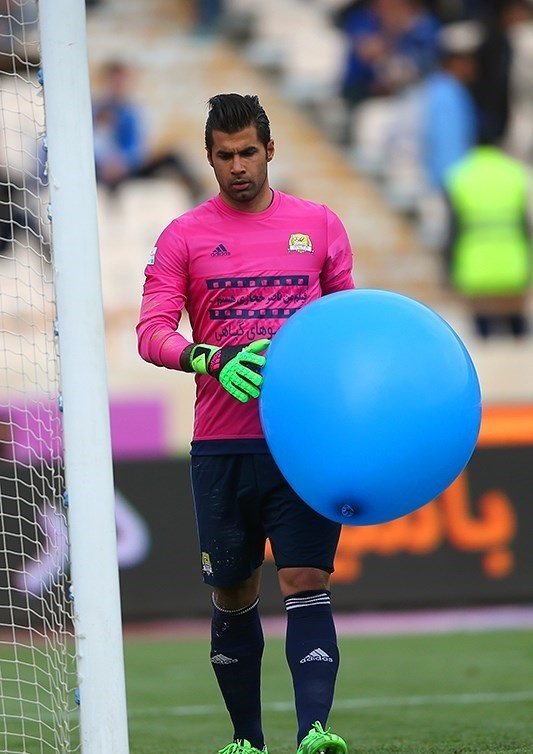
- Forozan in 2015

Personal information
- Full name: Mohsen Foroozan Mesrdashti
- Date of birth: 4 May 1988 (age 38)
- Place of birth: Rasht, Iran
- Height: 1.86 m (6 ft 1 in)
- Position: Goalkeeper

Team information
- Current team: Foolad
- Number: 68

Youth career
- 2001–2003: Shahrdari Khomam
- 2003–2007: Pegah Gilan

Senior career*
| Years | Team | Apps | (Gls) |
| 2006–2007 | Pegah Gilan | 1 | (0) |
| 2007–2009 | Malavan | 1 | (0) |
| 2009–2010 | Damash Gilan | 16 | (0) |
| 2010–2011 | Gostaresh Foulad | 18 | (0) |
| 2011–2013 | Tractor | 30 | (0) |
| 2013–2014 | Gostaresh Foulad | 27 | (0) |
| 2014–2015 | Esteghlal | 28 | (0) |
| 2015 | Siah Jamegan | 10 | (0) |
| 2016 | Rah Ahan | 13 | (0) |
| 2016–2017 | Khoneh Be Khoneh | 5 | (0) |
| 2017 | Saba Qom | 13 | (0) |
| 2017–2018 | Pars Jonoubi | 28 | (0) |
| 2018–2019 | Tractor | 25 | (0) |
| 2020 | Pars Jonoubi | 2 | (0) |
| 2020–2021 | Foolad | 20 | (0) |
| 2021–2024 | Gol Gohar | 50 | (0) |
| 2024 | Zob Ahan | 9 | (0) |
| 2025 | Shams Azar | 13 | (0) |
| 2025 | Mes Rafsanjan | 1 | (0) |
| 2025– | Foolad | 0 | (0) |

International career^{‡}
| 2003–2004 | Iran U17 | | |
| 2005–2006 | Iran U20 | | |
| 2006–2007 | Iran U23 | | |
| 2012–2015 | Iran | 3 | (0) |
- * Club domestic league appearances and goals as of 2 May 2025 ‡ National team caps and goals as of 4 January 2015

Mohsen Forouzan (Persian: محسن فروزان; born 3 May 1988) is an Iranian footballer who plays for Foolad in Persian Gulf Pro League as a goalkeeper. He is also capped by the Iran national football team.

== Club career ==
Forouzan started his senior career in 2004 with local club Pegah Gilan, he moved to rival club Malavan in 2007. In 2011 Forouzan signed with Tractor and played in the Asian Champions League for the first time in his career. After two years at the club Forouzan signed with another Tabrizi team, this time Gostaresh Foulad, in his only season with the club he helped the team avoid relegation. In the summer of 2014 Forouzan transferred to Esteghlal. After Mehdi Rahmati joined Esteghlal in the summer of 2015, Forouzan decided to leave the club and sign for newly promoted Siah Jamegan. He was released halfway through the 2015–16 season.

=== Club career statistics ===
As of 29 July 2018

| Club performance | | | League | | Cup | | Continental | | Total | |
| Season | Club | League | Apps | Goals | Apps | Goals | Apps | Goals | Apps | Goals |
| Iran | | | League | | Hazfi Cup | | Asia | | Total | |
|---|---|---|---|---|---|---|---|---|---|---|
| 2009–10 | Damash | Azadegan League | 16 | 0 | 2 | 0 | 0 | 0 | 18 | 0 |
| 2010–11 | Gostaresh | Azadegan League | 18 | 0 | 0 | 0 | 0 | 0 | 18 | 0 |
| 2011–12 | Tractor | Iran Pro League | 24 | 0 | 1 | 0 | 0 | 0 | 25 | 0 |
| 2012–13 | Tractor | Iran Pro League | 6 | 0 | 1 | 0 | 0 | 0 | 7 | 0 |
| 2013–14 | Gostaresh | Iran Pro League | 27 | 0 | 1 | 0 | 0 | 0 | 28 | 0 |
| 2014–15 | Esteghlal | Iran Pro League | 28 | 0 | 3 | 0 | 0 | 0 | 31 | 0 |
| 2015 | Siah Jamegan | Iran Pro League | 11 | 0 | 0 | 0 | 0 | 0 | 11 | 0 |
| 2016 | Rah Ahan | Iran Pro League | 13 | 0 | 0 | 0 | 0 | 0 | 13 | 0 |
| 2017 | Khoneh Khoneh | Azadegan League | 12 | 0 | 0 | 0 | 0 | 0 | 12 | 0 |
| 2017 | Saba Qom | Iran Pro League | 13 | 0 | 0 | 0 | 0 | 0 | 13 | 0 |
| 2017-18 | Pars Jonoubi | Iran Pro League | 28 | 0 | 0 | 0 | 0 | 0 | 28 | 0 |
| 2018-19 | Tractor | Iran Pro League | 1 | 0 | 0 | 0 | 0 | 0 | 1 | 0 |
| Total | Iran | | 197 | 0 | 8 | 0 | 0 | 0 | 205 | 0 |

== International career ==
He was called into Iran's 2015 AFC Asian Cup squad on 30 December 2014 by Carlos Queiroz.

== Honours ==
Foolad

- Hazfi Cup: 2020–21
