= Mohammad Moslemipour =

Iranian footballer

محمد مسلمی پور
Personal information
- Full name: Mohammad Moslemipour
- Date of birth: May 25, 1997 (age 29)
- Place of birth: Tabriz, Iran
- Height: 1.75 m (5 ft 9 in)
- Position: Left back

Team information
- Current team: Tractor
- Number: 77

Youth career
- 2016–2017: Tractor

Senior career*
Years	Team	Apps	(Gls)
2017–2019	Tractor	12	(0)
2019	Sepahan	2	(0)
2019	Tractor	4	(0)
2019–2020	Machine Sazi	3	(0)
2020-	Tractor	5	(0)

International career^{‡}
2016–	Iran U23	10	(0)
- * Club domestic league appearances and goals as of 16 June 2019 ‡ National team caps and goals as of 16 June 2019

Mohammad Moslemipour (born May 25, 1997) is an Iranian footballer who plays for Tractor as a defender.

== Club career ==
=== Tractor S.C. ===
Moslemipour joined Tractor in summer 2017.

== Club career statistics ==
As of 3 January 2019

Club	Division	Season	League		Hazfi Cup		Asia		Total	
Club	Division	Season	Apps	Goals	Apps	Goals	Apps	Goals	Apps	Goals
Tractor	Pro League	2017–18	11	0			4	0	15	0
Tractor	Pro League	2018–19	1	0			–	–	1	0
Sepahan	Pro League	2018–19	0	0			–	–	0	0
Career total			12	0			4	0	16	0
