= Alireza Heidari (footballer) =

Iranian footballer

Personal information
- Date of birth: 1 December 1992 (age 33)
- Place of birth: Tehran, Iran
- Height: 1.84 m (6 ft 1/2 in)
- Position: Goalkeeper

Team information
- Current team: Be'sat Kermanshah
- Number: 22

Youth career
- 2005–2007: Paykan
- 2007–2012: Rah Ahan

Senior career*
Years	Team	Apps	(Gls)
2010–2013	Rah Ahan	2	(0)
2013–2016	Padideh	7	(0)
2016–2018	Malavan	14	(0)
2018–2019	Tractor	0	(0)
2019–2020	Machine Sazi	6	(0)
2020–2021	Mes Kerman	8	(0)
2022–2023	Shams Azar	5	(0)
2023–2024	Shahin Bandar Ameri	7	(0)
2024–	Be'sat Kermanshah	18	(0)
- * Club domestic league appearances and goals as of 1 May 2025

Alireza Heidari (Persian: علیرضا حیدری; born 1 December 1992) is an Iranian football goalkeeper who plays for Be'sat Kermanshah in the Azadegan League.

== Club career ==
=== Rah Ahan ===
Heidari was part of Rah Ahan Academy during 2007 to 2012. He promoted to first team by Mehdi Tartar in 2010. He made his debut in final fixture of 2011–12 Iran Pro League against Shahin Bushehr as a starter.

=== Padideh ===
He joined Padideh in summer 2013 with four-years contract. He made his debut for Padideh against Saba Qom as a substitute for Mojtaba Roshangar in 2014–15 Iran Pro League.

== Club career statistics ==
As of 19 August 2014

Club	Division	Season	League		Hazfi Cup		Asia		Total	
Club	Division	Season	Apps	Goals	Apps	Goals	Apps	Goals	Apps	Goals
Rah Ahan	Pro League	2010–11	0	0	0	0	–	–	0	0
Rah Ahan	Pro League	2011–12	1	0	0	0	–	–	1	0
Rah Ahan	Pro League	2012–13	1	0	0	0	–	–	1	0
Padideh	Division 1	2013–14	0	0	0	0	–	–	0	0
Padideh	Pro League	2014–15	2	0	0	0	–	–	2	0
Career totals			4	0	0	0	0	0	4	0
