= Hassan Azarnia =

Iranian former footballer and coach

Personal information
- Full name: Hassan Azarnia
- Date of birth: 27 June 1957 (age 69)
- Place of birth: Tabriz, Iran
- Height: 1.82 m (6 ft 0 in)
- Position: Defender

Team information
- Current team: Tractor (supervisor)

Youth career
- 1975–1977: Tractor

Senior career*
| Years | Team | Apps | (Gls) |
| 1976–1985 | Tractor | | |

Managerial career
- 2007–2008: Shahrdari Tabriz
- 2009: Saba (assistant)
- 2010–2011: Mes Soongoun
- 2011–2013: Tractor (technical manager)
- 2013: Tractor (interim)
- 2014–2018: Gostaresh (technical manager)
- 2018–2019: Tractor (supervisor)
- * Club domestic league appearances and goals

Hassan Azarnia (حسن آذرنیا in Persian, born 27 June 1957) is an Iranian football coach and former footballer. He is the supervisor of Iranian football club Tractor S.C.
