= Reza Abdi =

Iranian footballer

Personal information
- Date of birth: 11 May 1996 (age 30)
- Place of birth: Tabriz, Iran
- Height: 1.83 m (6 ft 0 in)
- Position: Striker

Team information
- Current team: Tuzlaspor

Youth career
- 2013–2016: Tractor

Senior career*
Years	Team	Apps	(Gls)
2016–2018	Tractor	4	(0)
2019–2020	Machine Sazi	2	(0)
2020–2021	Gol Reyhan Alborz	3	(0)
2021–2022	Rayka Babol	26	(5)
2023–	Tuzlaspor	0	(0)
- * Club domestic league appearances and goals as of 25 August 2023

Reza Abdi (Persian: رضا عبدی; born 5 May 1996) is an Iranian striker who plays for Turkish club Tuzlaspor.
