= Aghil Kaabi =

Iranian footballer (born 1990)

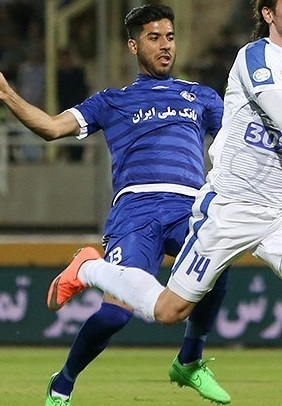

Personal information
- Date of birth: 29 July 1990 (age 36)
- Place of birth: Ahvaz, Iran
- Height: 1.84 m (6 ft 0 in)
- Position: Left back

Team information
- Current team: Foolad B
- Number: 4

Senior career*
Years	Team	Apps	(Gls)
2010–2013	Naft Ahvaz		
2013–2015	Foolad B	40	(2)
2015–2018	Esteghlal Khuzestan	75	(2)
2018–2020	Sanat Naft	51	(2)
2020–2022	Mes Rafsanjan	53	(3)
2022–2023	Naft M.I.S	23	(2)
2023–2024	Esteghlal Khuzestan	7	(0)
2024	Karbala		
2024–	Foolad B		
- * Club domestic league appearances and goals as of 31 December 2023

Aghil Kaabi (Persian: عقیل کعبی; born 29 July 1990) is an Iranian professional footballer who plays as a defender for Foolad B in League 2.

== Club career ==
Kaabi joined to Foolad Novin in summer 2013 from Naft Masjed Soleyman. He was part of Foolad Novin in promoting to Division 1 in 2014 and to Pro League in 2015. He joined Esteghlal Khuzestan in summer 2015 with a contract until 2018. he made his professional debut for Esteghlal Khuzestan on 14 August 2015 in Ahvaz Derby against Foolad as a starter.

== Club career statistics ==
As of 25 December 2017.

Club	Division	Season	League		Hazfi Cup		Asia		Total	
Club	Division	Season	Apps	Goals	Apps	Goals	Apps	Goals	Apps	Goals
Foolad Novin	Division 2	2013–14	21	1	1	0	–	–	22	1
Foolad Novin	Division 1	2014–15	19	1	1	0	–	–	20	1
Esteghlal Khuzestan	Pro League	2015–16	13	0	1	0	–	–	14	1
Esteghlal Khuzestan	Pro League	2016-17	26	1	1	0	7	0	34	0
Esteghlal Khuzestan	Pro League	2017-18	15	0	2	0	–	–	17	0
Career totals			44	3	6	0	7	0	57	3

== Honours ==
=== Club ===
Foolad Novin

- Azadegan League (1): 2014–15

Esteghlal Khuzestan

- Iran Pro League (1): 2015–16
- Iranian Super Cup runner-up: 2016
