= Koroush Maleki =

Iranian association football player

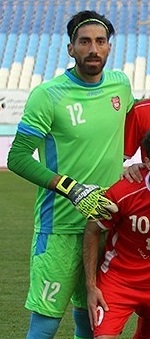

Personal information
- Date of birth: 9 May 1991 (age 35)
- Place of birth: Ravansar, Kermanshah, Iran
- Height: 1.98 m (6 ft 6 in)
- Position: Goalkeeper

Team information
- Current team: Nassaji Mazandaran
- Number: 22

Youth career
- –2012: Mes Rafsanjan

Senior career*
Years	Team	Apps	(Gls)
2012–2015	Mes Rafsanjan	15	(0)
2014–2015	→ Niroo Zamini (loan)	20	(0)
2015–2016	Mes Kerman	23	(0)
2016–2018	Gostaresh Foulad	9	(0)
2018–2019	Sepidrood	21	(0)
2019–2020	Baadraan	28	(0)
2020–2021	Saipa	3	(0)
2021–2022	Arman Gohar Sirjan	26	(0)
2022–2023	Kheybar Khorramabad	31	(0)
2023	Shams Azar	1	(0)
2023–2024	Kheybar Khorramabad	31	(0)
2024–2025	Sanat Naft	30	(0)
2025–	Nassaji Mazandaran	12	(0)
- * Club domestic league appearances and goals as of 7 December 2025

Koroush Maleki (Persian: کوروش ملکی; born 9 May 1991) is an Iranian footballer who plays as a goalkeeper for Nassaji Mazandaran in the Azadegan League.
