= Yousef Seyyedi =

Iranian footballer

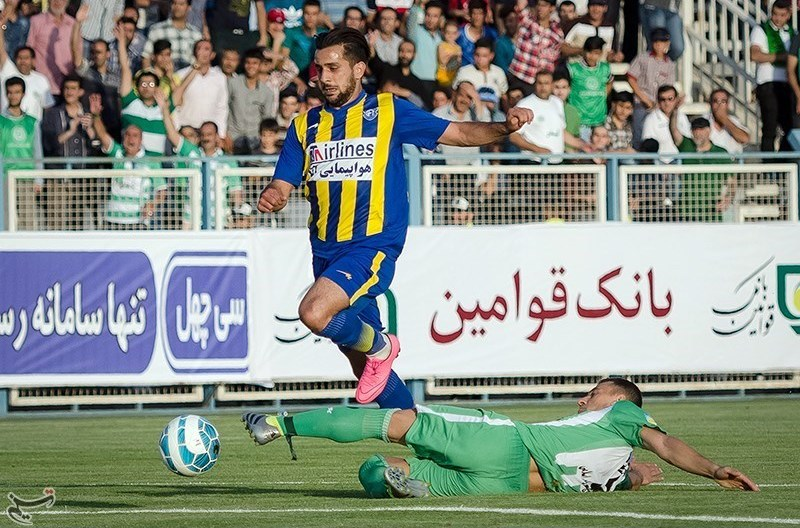

Personal information
- Full name: Yousef Seyyedi
- Date of birth: 8 March 1996 (age 30)
- Place of birth: Ardabil, Iran
- Height: 1.74 m (5 ft 9 in)
- Position: Winger

Team information
- Current team: Machine Sazi
- Number: 10

Youth career
- –2013: Zob Ahan Ardabil
- 2013–2016: Machine Sazi

Senior career*
Years	Team	Apps	(Gls)
2013–2018	Gostaresh Foulad	35	(2)
2015–2016	→ Machine Sazi (loan)	10	(2)
2018	Tractor	2	(0)
2018–	Machine Sazi	7	(1)

International career
2011–2013	Iran U17	12	(4)
2013–2015	Iran U20	4	(3)
- * Club domestic league appearances and goals as of 24 August 2018

Yousef Seyyedi (Persian: یوسف سیدی; born 8 March 1996) is an Iranian Football winger who currently plays for Machine Sazi in the Persian Gulf Pro League.

== Club career ==
=== Early years ===
Seyedi started his career with Zob Ahan Ardabil from youth levels.

=== Gostaresh Foolad ===
He joined Gostaresh Foolad in November 2013. He made his debut for Gostaresh Foolad on 31 October 2014 against Tractor as a substitute for Meysam Naghizadeh.

== Club career statistics ==
As of 11 December 2014.

Club	Division	Season	League		Hazfi Cup		Asia		Total	
Club	Division	Season	Apps	Goals	Apps	Goals	Apps	Goals	Apps	Goals
Gostaresh; Foolad	Pro League	2013–14	0	0	0	0	–	–	0	0
Gostaresh; Foolad	Pro League	2014–15	3	0	1	0	–	–	4	0
Career Totals			3	0	1	0	0	0	4	0

== International career ==
=== U17 ===
He was part of Iran U–17 in 2012 AFC U-16 Championship and 2013 FIFA U-17 World Cup.

=== U20 ===
He invited to Iran U–20 by Ali Dousti Mehr to preparation for 2014 AFC U-19 Championship.
