= Alireza Naghizadeh =

Iranian footballer

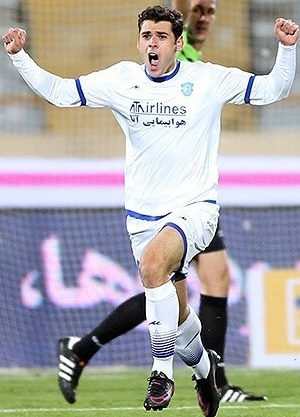

Personal information
- Date of birth: 4 March 1993 (age 33)
- Place of birth: Tabriz, Iran
- Height: 1.85 m (6 ft 1 in)
- Position: Central midfielder

Team information
- Current team: Paykan
- Number: 71

Youth career
- Mokhaberat Tabriz
- –2011: Tractor
- 2011–2014: Gostaresh Foulad

Senior career*
Years	Team	Apps	(Gls)
2012–2018	Gostaresh Foulad	84	(3)
2015–2016	→ Siah Jamegan (loan)	26	(1)
2018–2019	Tractor	23	(1)
2019–2020	Sepahan	0	(0)
2020–2021	Mes Rafsanjan	21	(1)
2021–2024	Aluminium Arak	71	(3)
2024–2025	Kheybar	10	(0)
2025–	Paykan	13	(1)

International career^{‡}
2013–2016	Iran U23	11	(5)
- * Club domestic league appearances and goals as of 21 April 2025 ‡ National team caps and goals as of 22 January 2016

Alireza Naghizadeh (Persian: علیرضا نقی زاده, born 4 March 1993) is an Iranian footballer who plays for Paykan as a central midfielder.

== Club career ==
He has started his career at Gostaresh.

=== Sepahan ===
- Last Update:27 August 2019

Club performance			League		Cup		Continental		Total	
Season	Club	League	Apps	Goals	Apps	Goals	Apps	Goals	Apps	Goals
Iran			League		Hazfi Cup		Asia		Total	
2019–20	Sepahan	Iran Pro League	0	0	0	0	0	0	0	0
Career total			0	0	0	0	0	0	0	0

== International career ==
=== U23 ===
He was invited to Iran U-23 training camp by Nelo Vingada to preparation for Incheon 2014 and 2016 AFC U-22 Championship.
