= List of Iranian football transfers summer 2020 =

This is a list of Iranian football transfers for the 2020 summer transfer window. Only moves from Persian Gulf Pro League are listed. The summer transfer window will begin on 27 August 2020 and closes at midnight on 19 November 2020. Players without a club may join at any time. This list includes transfers featuring at least one Iran Football League club which were completed after the end of the winter 2019–20 transfer window on 13 January and before the end of the 2020 summer window.

== Rules and regulations ==
According to Iran Football Federation rules for 2020–21 Persian Gulf Pro League, each Football Club is allowed to take up to maximum 7 new Iranian player from the other clubs who already played in the 2019–20 Persian Gulf Pro League season. In addition to these seven new players, each club is allowed to take up to 3 players from Free agent (who did not play in 2020–21 Persian Gulf Pro League season or doesn't list in any 2020–21 League after season's start) during the season. Under-25 years old players must be under contract of the club in the previous season. Under-21 and under-19 years old players can also be signed during the season.

=== Players limits ===
The Iranian Football Clubs who participate in 20–21 Iranian football different levels are allowed to have up to maximum 63 players in their player lists, which will be categorized in the following groups:

- Up to maximum 20 adult (without any age limit) players
- Up to maximum 4 under-25 players (i.e. the player whose birth is after 1 January 1996).
- Up to maximum 9 under-23 players (i.e. the player whose birth is after 1 January 1998).
- Up to maximum 15 under-21 players (i.e. the player whose birth is after 1 January 2000).
- Up to maximum 15 under-19 players (i.e. the player whose birth is after 1 January 2002).

== Persian Gulf Pro League ==
=== Aluminium ===
In:

No.	Pos.	Nation	Player
—	DF	(Iran) IRN	Mohammad Iranpourian (from Sepahan)
—	GK	(Iran) IRN	Hossein Pour Hamidi^{U23} (On loan from Esteghlal)

Out:

No.	Pos.	Nation	Player

=== Esteghlal ===
In:

No.	Pos.	Nation	Player
99	FW	(Iran) IRN	Sajjad Aghaei^{U23} (Loan return from Zob Ahan)
12	GK	(Iran) IRN	Mohammad Rashid Mazaheri (from Tractor)
27	DF	(Iran) IRN	Matin Karimzadeh^{U23} (from Pars Jonoubi)
22	MF	(Iran) IRN	Babak Moradi (from Machine Sazi)
20	DF	(Iran) IRN	Ahmad Mousavi (from Gol Gohar)
3	DF	(Iran) IRN	Mohammad Hossein Moradmand (from Shahr Khodro)
9	MF	(Iran) IRN	Mehdi Mehdipour (from Zob Ahan)
2	DF	(Iran) IRN	Mohammad Naderi (from (Belgium) Kortrijk)

Out:

No.	Pos.	Nation	Player
20	DF	(Bulgaria) BUL	Nikolay Bodurov (to (Bulgaria) Pirin Blagoevgrad)
30	DF	(Iran) IRN	Azim Gök (to Mes Kerman)
28	MF	(Iran) IRN	Mohsen Karimi (to Gol Gohar)
4	DF	(Iran) IRN	Roozbeh Cheshmi (to (Qatar) Umm Salal)
9	MF	(Iran) IRN	Ali Dashti (to Zob Ahan)
—	MF	(Iran) IRN	Aref Gholampour^{U21} (to Foolad)
80	FW	(Iran) IRN	Mohammad Bolboli^{U23} (On loan to Naft MIS)
6	MF	(Iran) IRN	Ali Karimi (to Qatar)
3	DF	(Iran) IRN	Milad Zakipour (to Gol Gohar)
—	MF	(Iran) IRN	Mohammad Eslami^{U23} (to Tractor)
32	DF	(Iran) IRN	Amirhossein Kargar^{U23} (to Gol Gohar)
19	GK	(Iran) IRN	Hossein Pour Hamidi^{U23} (On loan to Aluminium Arak)
17	FW	(Iran) IRN	Zakaria Moradi^{U23} (to Malavan)
57	DF	(Iran) IRN	Shahin Taherkhani (to Paykan)

=== Foolad ===
In:

No.	Pos.	Nation	Player
—	MF	(Iran) IRN	Aref Gholampour (from Esteghlal)

Out:

No.	Pos.	Nation	Player
3	DF	(Iran) IRN	Reza Sharbati (to Gol Gohar)

=== Gol Gohar ===
In:

No.	Pos.	Nation	Player
—	MF	(Iran) IRN	Mohammad Miri (from Nassaji)
—	MF	(Iran) IRN	Alireza Alizadeh (from Naft MIS)
—	MF	(Iran) IRN	Ali Asghar Ashouri (from Nassaji)
—	DF	(Iran) IRN	Alireza Arta (from Mes Kerman)
—	GK	(Iran) IRN	Alireza Haghighi (from Nassaji)
—	MF	(Iran) IRN	Saeid Sadeghi (from Shahr Khodro)
—	DF	(Iran) IRN	Armin Sohrabian (from Saipa)
—	DF	(Iran) IRN	Reza Sharbati (from Foolad)
—	FW	(Iran) IRN	Mohsen Karimi (from Esteghlal)
—	DF	(Iran) IRN	Milad Zakipour (from Esteghlal)
—	DF	(Iran) IRN	Amirhossein Kargar^{U23} (from Esteghlal)

Out:

No.	Pos.	Nation	Player
1	GK	(Iran) IRN	Milad Farahani (to Shahr Khodro)
2	DF	(Iran) IRN	Ahmad Mousavi (to Esteghlal)
25	MF	(Iran) IRN	Milad Kamandani (to Nassaji)
70	FW	(Iran) IRN	Sajjad Ashouri (to Mes Rafsanjan)
9	FW	(Iran) IRN	Mehrdad Bayrami (to Nassaji)
99	FW	(Iran) IRN	Farshad Biabani (to Machine Sazi)
3	DF	(Iran) IRN	Abdollah Hosseini (to Zob Ahan)

=== Machine Sazi ===
In:

No.	Pos.	Nation	Player
—	FW	(Iran) IRN	Ali Babaei^{U21} (from Sepahan)
—	FW	(Iran) IRN	Farshad Biabani (from Gol Gohar)
—	DF	(Iran) IRN	Abolfazl Razzaghpour (On loan from Tractor)
—	DF	(Iran) IRN	Mehdi Rahimi^{U23} (from Sepahan)

Out:

No.	Pos.	Nation	Player
1	GK	(Iran) IRN	Hamed Lak (to Persepolis)
88	MF	(Iran) IRN	Ghaem Eslamikhah (to Mes Rafsanjan)
26	DF	(Iran) IRN	Masih Zahedi (to Mes Rafsanjan)
99	MF	(Iran) IRN	Mohammad Ghaderi (to Tractor)
77	DF	(Iran) IRN	Mohammad Moslemipour (to Tractor)
48	MF	(Iran) IRN	Mohammad Khorram (to Tractor)

=== Mes Rafsanjan ===
In:

No.	Pos.	Nation	PlayerSepidrood Rasht S.C.
—	MF	(Iran) IRN	Hossein Shenani (from Mes Kerman)
—	GK	(Iran) IRN	Davoud Noushi Soufiani (from Mes Kerman)
—	DF	(Iran) IRN	Saeed Karimi (from Naft MIS)
—	DF	(Iran) IRN	Aghil Kaabi (from Sanat Naft)
—	DF	(Iran) IRN	Alireza Daghagheleh (from Esteghlal Khuzestan)
—	FW	(Iran) IRN	Emad Mirjavan (from Naft MIS)
—	FW	(Iran) IRN	Faraz Emamali (from Paykan)
—	MF	(Iran) IRN	Ghaem Eslamikhah (from Machine Sazi)
—	DF	(Iran) IRN	Masih Zahedi (from Machine Sazi)
—	MF	(Iran) IRN	Meysam Naghizadeh (from Naft MIS)
—	GK	(Iran) IRN	Nasser Salari (from Sanat Naft)
—	FW	(Iran) IRN	Sajjad Ashouri (from Gol Gohar)
—	MF	(Iran) IRN	Alireza Naghizadeh (from Sepahan)

Out:

No.	Pos.	Nation	Player
8	MF	(Iran) IRN	Hamid Golzari (to Saipa)
—	GK	(Iran) IRN	Kourosh Maleki (to Saipa)

=== Naft Masjed-Soleyman ===
In:

No.	Pos.	Nation	Player
—	FW	(Iran) IRN	Mohammad Bolboli (On loan from Esteghlal)

Out:

No.	Pos.	Nation	Player
6	MF	(Iran) IRN	Alireza Alizadeh (to Gol Gohar)
70	FW	(Iran) IRN	Ahmad Aljabouri (to Shahr Khodro)
7	MF	(Iran) IRN	Sadegh Sadeghi (to Shahr Khodro)
66	DF	(Iran) IRN	Saeed Karimi (to Mes Rafsanjan)
90	FW	(Iran) IRN	Emad Mirjavan (to Mes Rafsanjan)
14	MF	(Iran) IRN	Meysam Naghizadeh (to Mes Rafsanjan)
33	GK	(Iran) IRN	Habib Far Abbasi (to Tractor)

=== Nassaji ===
In:

No.	Pos.	Nation	Player
—	MF	(Iran) IRN	Milad Kamandani (from Gol Gohar)
—	FW	(Iran) IRN	Mehrdad Bayrami (from Gol Gohar)
—	GK	(Iran) IRN	Amir Hossein Nikpour^{U21} (from Sepahan)

Out:

No.	Pos.	Nation	Player
88	GK	(Iran) IRN	Alireza Haghighi (to Gol Gohar)
19	MF	(Iran) IRN	Mohammad Miri (to Gol Gohar)
8	MF	(Iran) IRN	Ali Asghar Ashouri (to Gol Gohar)
7	FW	(Iran) IRN	Rahman Jafari (to Shahr Khodro)
66	MF	(Iran) IRN	Mohammad Erfan Masoumi (to Shahr Khodro)
10	MF	(Iran) IRN	Ali Shojaei (to Persepolis)
91	FW	(Iran) IRN	Rouhollah Bagheri (to Sepahan)
33	FW	(Iran) IRN	Mohammad Abbaszadeh (to Tractor)

=== Paykan ===
In:

No.	Pos.	Nation	Player
—	DF	(Iran) IRN	Shahin Taherkhani (from Esteghlal)

Out:

No.	Pos.	Nation	Player
9	FW	(Iran) IRN	Faraz Emamali (to Mes Rafsanjan)
99	MF	(Iran) IRN	Amir Hossein Karimi (to Shahr Khodro)
70	FW	(Iran) IRN	Shahriar Moghanlou (to (Portugal) Santa Clara)
10	MF	(Iran) IRN	Saeed Vasei (to Tractor)
17	MF	(Iran) IRN	Jalaleddin Alimohammadi (to Sepahan)

=== Persepolis ===
In:

No.	Pos.	Nation	Player
77	DF	(Iran) IRN	Saeid Aghaei (from Sepahan)
81	GK	(Iran) IRN	Hamed Lak (from Machine Sazi)
72	FW	(Iran) IRN	Issa Alekasir (from Sanat Naft)
14	MF	(Iran) IRN	Ehsan Pahlevan (from Zob Ahan)
66	MF	(Iran) IRN	Milad Sarlak (from Shahr Khodro)
23	MF	(Iran) IRN	Ali Shojaei (from Nassaji)
36	FW	(Iran) IRN	Arman Ramezani (from Saipa)
18	MF	(Iran) IRN	Mohammad Sharifi^{U21} (from Saipa)

Out:

No.	Pos.	Nation	Player
10	FW	(Republic of Ireland) IRL	Anthony Stokes (to (Scotland) Livingston)
1	GK	(Iran) IRN	Alireza Beiranvand (to (Belgium) Antwerp)
28	DF	(Iran) IRN	Mohammad Naderi (Loan return to (Belgium) Kortrijk)
9	MF	(Iran) IRN	Mehdi Torabi (to (Qatar) Al-Arabi)
70	FW	(Iran) IRN	Ali Alipour (to (Portugal) Marítimo)
99	FW	(Nigeria) NGA	Christian Osaguona (to (Iraq) Al-Shorta)

=== Saipa ===
In:

No.	Pos.	Nation	Player
—	MF	(Iran) IRN	Hamid Golzari (from Mes Rafsanjan)
—	GK	(Iran) IRN	Kourosh Maleki (from Mes Rafsanjan)
—	MF	(Iran) IRN	Mohsen Mosalman (from Sepahan)

Out:

No.	Pos.	Nation	Player
9	FW	(Iran) IRN	Arman Ramezani (to Persepolis)
13	DF	(Iran) IRN	Armin Sohrabian (to Gol Gohar)
11	MF	(Iran) IRN	Mohammad Sharifi (to Persepolis)

=== Sanat Naft ===
In:

No.	Pos.	Nation	Player
—	DF	(Iran) IRN	Mohammad Tayyebi (from Sepahan)

Out:

No.	Pos.	Nation	Player
7	FW	(Iran) IRN	Issa Alekasir (to Persepolis)
4	DF	(Iran) IRN	Aghil Kaabi (to Mes Rafsanjan)
13	GK	(Iran) IRN	Nasser Salari (to Mes Rafsanjan)

=== Shahr Khodro ===
In:

No.	Pos.	Nation	Player
—	FW	(Iran) IRN	Ahmad Aljabouri (from Naft MIS)
—	FW	(Iran) IRN	Rahman Jafari (from Nassaji)
—	MF	(Iran) IRN	Mohammad Erfan Masoumi (from Nassaji)
—	MF	(Iran) IRN	Sadegh Sadeghi (from Naft MIS)
—	MF	(Iran) IRN	Amir Hossein Karimi (from Paykan)
—	GK	(Iran) IRN	Milad Farahani (from Gol Gohar)

Out:

No.	Pos.	Nation	Player
15	MF	(Iran) IRN	Milad Sarlak (to Persepolis)
4	DF	(Iran) IRN	Mohammad Hossein Moradmand (to Esteghlal)
99	MF	(Iran) IRN	Mohammad Reza Khalatbari (to Sepahan)

=== Sepahan ===
In:

No.	Pos.	Nation	Player
19	MF	(Iran) IRN	Omid Noorafkan^{U25} (Loan return to (Belgium) Charleroi / from (Belgium) Charleroi)
12	MF	(Iran) IRN	Reza Dehghani^{U23} (Loan return from Nassaji)
70	MF	(Iran) IRN	Hamed Bahiraei (Loan return from Nassaji)
15	MF	(Iran) IRN	Mohammad Papi^{U23} (Loan return from Gol Reyhan)
52	DF	(Iran) IRN	Mohammad Reza Asgari^{U21} (from Sepahan U19)
11	DF	(Iran) IRN	Danial Esmaeilifar (from Zob Ahan)
2	DF	(Iran) IRN	Mohammad Nejadmehdi (from Zob Ahan)
99	MF	(Iran) IRN	Mohammad Reza Khalatbari (from Shahr Khodro)
23	DF	(Iran) IRN	Sobhan Pasandideh^{U23} (from Sepahan U21)
18	FW	(Iran) IRN	Alireza Sadeghi^{U23} (from Sepahan U21)
55	GK	(Iran) IRN	Ariyan Janghorban^{U21} (from Sepahan U19)
27	FW	(Iran) IRN	Rouhollah Bagheri (from Nassaji)
17	MF	(Iran) IRN	Jalaleddin Alimohammadi (from Paykan)

Out:

No.	Pos.	Nation	Player
25	FW	(Iran) IRN	Ali Ghorbani (to (Azerbaijan) Sumgayit)
77	MF	(Hungary) HUN	Vladimir Koman (to (United Arab Emirates) Hatta)
7	DF	(Iran) IRN	Saeid Aghaei (to Persepolis)
18	FW	(Iran) IRN	Ali Babaei^{U21} (to Machine Sazi)
24	MF	(Iran) IRN	Alireza Naghizadeh (to Mes Rafsanjan)
22	DF	(Iran) IRN	Mohammad Tayyebi (to Sanat Naft Abadan)
23	MF	(Iran) IRN	Ali Khosravi (to Baadraan)
2	DF	(Iran) IRN	Mohammad Iranpourian (to Aluminium)
14	FW	(Iran) IRN	Abolfazl Akasheh^{U23} (Loan return from Aluminium / to Zob Ahan)
26	DF	(Iran) IRN	Davoud Rajabi (Loan return from Baadraan / to Baadraan)
50	GK	(Iran) IRN	Shahab Adeli (On loan to Baadraan)
55	GK	(Iran) IRN	Amir Hossein Nikpour^{U21} (to Nassaji)
90	MF	(Iran) IRN	Mohammad Zeynali (Loan return from Navad Urmia / to Navad Urmia)
11	MF	(Iran) IRN	Mohsen Mosalman (to Saipa)
78	DF	(Iran) IRN	Mehdi Rahimi^{U23} (Loan return from Nassaji / to Machine Sazi)

=== Tractor ===
In:

No.	Pos.	Nation	Player
30	DF	(Iran) IRN	Abolfazl Razzaghpour (Loan return from Shahin Bushehr)
—	MF	(Iran) IRN	Mohammad Ghaderi (from Machine Sazi)
—	DF	(Iran) IRN	Mohammed Ghanbari (from Khooshe Talaei)
—	DF	(Iran) IRN	Mohammad Moslemipour (from Machine Sazi)
—	DF	(Iran) IRN	Hadi Mohammadi (from Zob Ahan)
—	DF	(Iran) IRN	Vafa Hakhamaneshi (from Zob Ahan)
—	MF	(Iran) IRN	Mohammad Khorram (from Machine Sazi)
—	FW	(Iran) IRN	Amin Assadi (from Arman Gohar)
—	GK	(Iran) IRN	Habib Far Abbasi (from Naft MIS)
—	MF	(Iran) IRN	Saeed Vasei (from Paykan)
—	MF	(Iran) IRN	Mohammad Eslami^{U23} (from Esteghlal)
—	FW	(Iran) IRN	Mohammad Abbaszadeh (from Nassaji Mazandaran)

Out:

No.	Pos.	Nation	Player
9	MF	(Iran) IRN	Reza Asadi (to (Austria) St. Pölten)
1	GK	(Iran) IRN	Mohammad Rashid Mazaheri (to Esteghlal)
30	DF	(Iran) IRN	Abolfazl Razzaghpour (On loan to Machine Sazi)
16	FW	(Iran) IRN	Mohammad Reza Azadi (to (Greece) Panetolikos)
10	FW	(Iran) IRN	Sasan Ansari (to Foolad)
4	DF	(Iran) IRN	Iman Salimi (Unattached)

=== Zob Ahan ===
In:

No.	Pos.	Nation	Player
—	DF	(Iran) IRN	Abdollah Hosseini (from Gol Gohar)
—	FW	(Iran) IRN	Abolfazl Akasheh^{U23} (from Sepahan)
—	MF	(Iran) IRN	Ali Dashti (from Esteghlal)

Out:

No.	Pos.	Nation	Player
—	FW	(Iran) IRN	Sajjad Aghaei (Loan return to Esteghlal)
11	MF	(Iran) IRN	Danial Esmaeilifar (to Sepahan)
10	MF	(Iran) IRN	Ehsan Pahlevan (to Persepolis)
2	DF	(Iran) IRN	Mohammad Nejadmehdi (to Sepahan)
99	MF	(Iran) IRN	Mehdi Mehdipour (to Esteghlal)
4	DF	(Iran) IRN	Hadi Mohammadi (to Tractor)
6	DF	(Iran) IRN	Vafa Hakhamaneshi (to Tractor)

== Azadegan League ==
=== Pars Jonoubi ===
In:

No.	Pos.	Nation	Player

Out:

No.	Pos.	Nation	Player
21	MF	(Iran) IRN	Adam Hemati (to (Azerbaijan) Sumgayit)

=== Shahin Bushehr ===
In:

No.	Pos.	Nation	Player

Out:

No.	Pos.	Nation	Player
2	DF	(Iran) IRN	Abolfazl Razzaghpour (Loan return to Tractor)
