= 2017–18 Tractor S.C. season =

Tractor
2017–18 season
- Chairman: Mostafa Ajorlu
- Manager: Yahya Golmohammadi(until 16 January 2018); Mojtaba Hosseini(from 16 January until 20 January 2018); Ertuğrul Sağlam (from 20 January 2018)
- Stadium: Yadegar-e Emam Stadium
- Persian Gulf Pro League: 10th
- Hazfi Cup: Quarter-Final
- AFC Champions League: Group stage
- Top goalscorer: League: Ehsan Pahlevan; Mohammad Iranpourian (6 goals); All: Mohammad Iranpourian (7 goals)
- Highest home attendance: 45,000 v Persepolis (3 August 2017)
- Lowest home attendance: 1,000 v Sanat Naft (22 April 2018)
- Average home league attendance: 10,807
Home colours	Away colours	Third colours

The 2017–18 season is Tractor's 10th season in the Persian Gulf Pro League. They will also be competing in the Hazfi Cup & AFC Champions League. Tractor is captained by Mehdi Kiani.

== Club ==
Position	Staff
Head coach	Yahya Golmohammadi
First team coach	Mojtaba Hosseini
Assistant coach	Ali Reza Pezhman
Assistant coach	Rodolfo Correa
Fitness coach	Mazaher Rahimpour
Goalkeeper coach	Rui Tavares
Analyzer	Mohammad Asgari
Doctor & Physiotherapist	Ramzan Norouzzadeh
Psychologist	Akbar Sobhi
B team manager	Farhad Pourgholami
Technical manager	Ahad Sheykhlari

=== Management ===
Position	Staff
President	Mostafa Ajorlu
Vice President	Kazem Mahmoudi
Board chairman	Ali Akbar Pourjamshidian
Board members	Sadegh Najafi-Khazarlou; Alireza Navin; Mohammad Javad Dolfkar; Muhammad Ismail Saidi; Ghafour Kargari; Dara Ghaznavi; Mohammad Ali Mojtahedi
Fans club president	Rahman Yavaran
Academy manager	Sadegh Pourhossein

== First Team Squad ==
=== Current squad ===
As of 7 January 2018

Note: Flags indicate national team as defined under FIFA eligibility rules; some limited exceptions apply. Players may hold more than one non-FIFA nationality.

No.	Pos.	Nation	Player
1	GK	IRI	Farzin Garousian
2	DF	IRI	Mohammad Iranpourian
3	DF	IRI	Reza Sharbati (on loan from Meshki Pooshan)
5	DF	CRO	Šime Gregov
6	MF	IRI	Mehdi Kiani (Captain)
7	MF	IRI	Omid Alishah (on loan from Persepolis)
8	DF	IRI	Danial Esmaeilifar (on loan from Zob Ahan)
9	MF	IRI	Mehdi Mehdipour (on loan from Zob Ahan)
10	FW	IRI	Mohammad Ebrahimi
11	FW	IRI	Shahram Goudarzi
14	MF	IRI	Mohammad Nouri
15	FW	IRI	Ehsan Pahlavan (on loan from Zob Ahan)
16	DF	IRI	Mohammadreza Mehdizadeh
17	FW	IRI	Amir Arsalan Motahari
18	FW	BIH	Sulejman Krpić
19	FW	IRI	Mohammad Reza Azadi

No.	Pos.	Nation	Player
23	DF	IRI	Aref Aghasi (on loan from Foolad)
24	FW	IRI	Farzad Hatami
27	FW	IRI	Fakher Tahami (on loan from Sanat Naft)
28	DF	IRI	Mohammad Naderi^{U23}
29	FW	IRI	Reza Abdi ^{U23}
30	MF	IRI	Amir Asadzadeh ^{U23}
32	FW	IRI	Hamed Hosseinalizadeh ^{U21}
33	GK	IRI	Mahdi Mohammadian ^{U21}
34	DF	IRI	Jafar Dehghan ^{U23}
38	DF	IRI	Amir Mehdi Janmaleki ^{U21}
40	DF	IRI	Ali Esmaeili ^{U23}
44	GK	BRA	Jordi Almeida (on loan from Vasco da Gama)
47	FW	IRI	Mehdi Sharifi (on loan from Sepahan)
66	MF	IRI	Sina Ashouri
70	DF	IRI	Amir Reza Nasr Azadani ^{U23}
77	DF	IRI	Mohammad Moslemipour ^{U21}
88	MF	IRI	Ali Taheran ^{U21}
99	MF	IRI	Ghaem Eslamikhah ^{U23} (on loan from Baadraan Tehran)

== Transfers ==
=== Summer ===
In: Note: Flags indicate national team as defined under FIFA eligibility rules; some limited exceptions apply. Players may hold more than one non-FIFA nationality.

No.	Pos.	Nation	Player

Out: Note: Flags indicate national team as defined under FIFA eligibility rules; some limited exceptions apply. Players may hold more than one non-FIFA nationality.

No.	Pos.	Nation	Player
—	GK	IRI	Mohammad Reza Akhbari (Loan return to Saipa)
—	DF	IRI	Saeid Aghaei (to Sepahan)
—	MF	IRQ	Karrar Jassim (to Sanat Naft)
—	FW	BRA	Éder Luciano (Released)
—	DF	IRI	Mohsen Bengar (Released)
—	DF	IRI	Khaled Shafiei (to (South Korea) FC Seoul)
—	MF	IRI	Mohammad Papi (to Fajr Sepasi)

=== Winter ===
In: Note: Flags indicate national team as defined under FIFA eligibility rules; some limited exceptions apply. Players may hold more than one non-FIFA nationality.

No.	Pos.	Nation	Player
18	FW	BIH	Sulejman Krpić (from (Bosnia and Herzegovina) Sloboda Tuzla)
17	FW	IRI	Amir Arsalan Motahari (from Pars Jonoubi Jam)
15	FW	IRI	Ehsan Pahlavan (on loan from Zob Ahan)
9	MF	IRI	Mehdi Mehdipour (on loan from Zob Ahan)
8	DF	IRI	Danial Esmaeilifar (on loan from Zob Ahan)
5	DF	CRO	Šime Gregov (from (Norway) Viking)
3	DF	IRI	Reza Sharbati (on loan from Meshki Pooshan)
44	GK	BRA	Jordi Almeida (from (Brazil) Vasco da Gama)

Out: Note: Flags indicate national team as defined under FIFA eligibility rules; some limited exceptions apply. Players may hold more than one non-FIFA nationality.

No.	Pos.	Nation	Player
47	FW	IRI	Mehdi Sharifi (Loan return to Sepahan)

== Competitions ==
=== Overview ===
Competition	First match	Last match	Starting round	Final position	Record							
Competition	First match	Last match	Starting round	Final position	Pld	W	D	L	GF	GA	GD	Win %
Pro League	27 July 2017	27 April 2018	—	10th	30	8	10	12	28	33	−5	26.67
Hazfi Cup	8 September 2017	19 December 2017	Round of 32	Quarter-Final	3	2	1	0	7	3	+4	66.67
AFC Champions League	30 January 2018	17 April 2018	Group stage	Group stage	6	0	2	4	2	10	−8	0.00
Total					39	10	13	16	37	46	−9	25.64

Last updated: 27 April 2018.
Source: Competitions

=== Persian Gulf Pro League ===
==== Standings ====
Pos	Team	Pld	W	D	L	GF	GA	GD	Pts
8	Sanat Naft	30	10	10	10	36	36	0	40
9	Gostaresh	30	9	10	11	24	32	−8	37
10	Tractor Sazi	30	8	10	12	28	33	−5	34
11	Padideh	30	10	9	11	33	33	0	33 (Note: Padideh deducted 6 points by FIFA)
12	Est. Khuzestan	30	7	10	13	25	42	−17	31

Updated to match(es) played on April 13, 2018. Source: IPL Stats, Soccerway
Rules for classification: 1) Points; 2) Goal difference; 3) Goals scored.

==== Results summary ====
Overall								Home						Away					
Pld	W	D	L	GF	GA	GD	Pts	W	D	L	GF	GA	GD	W	D	L	GF	GA	GD
30	8	10	12	28	33	−5	34	4	7	4	17	15	+2	4	3	8	11	18	−7

Last updated: April 27, 2018.
Source: Ipl Stats

==== Results by round ====
Round	1	2	3	4	5	6	7	8	9	10	11	12	13	14	15	16	17	18	19	20	21	22	23	24	25	26	27	28	29	30
Ground	A	H	A	H	A	H	H	A	H	A	H	A	H	A	H	H	A	H	A	H	A	A	H	A	H	A	H	A	H	A
Result	L	L	L	W	W	D	L	W	D	L	D	L	W	D	D	W	L	D	L	L	D	W	W	D	L	L	D	L	D	W
Position	13	14	15	13	8	8	10	7	7	10	8	13	10	11	11	10	10	11	11	11	11	10	10	10	10	10	10	10	11	10

Updated to match(es) played on April 27, 2018. Source: "iranleague".
A = Away; H = Home; W = Win; D = Draw; L = Loss

==== Matches ====
Win Draw Loss Postponed

Date Round	Home	Score	Away	Location

27 July 2017 1	Esteghlal Khuzestan	1 – 0	Tractor	Ahvaz
21:00 DST+04:30	Doraghi 92'	Report		Stadium: Ghadir Stadium; Attendance: 200

3 August 2017 2	Tractor	1 – 2	Persepolis	Tabriz
19:30 DST +04:30	Hatami 41'; Taheran (yellow card) 80'	Report	Mensha 15'; Kamyabinia 67'; Beiranvand (yellow card) 90+2'	Stadium: Yadegar-e-Emam Stadium; Attendance: 45.000

11 August 2017 3	Esteghlal	1 – 0	Tractor	Tehran
20:45 IRDT (UTC+04:30)	Djeparov 42'; Shojaeian (yellow card) 67'	Report	Taheran (yellow card) 41'	Stadium: Azadi Stadium; Attendance: 61,000

17 August 2017 4	Tractor	2 – 1	Naft Tehran	Tabriz
19:45 (UTC+04:30)	Iranpourian 21' 89'	Report	Aghaei 82'	Stadium: Yadegar-e Emam Stadium; Attendance: 15,000

22 August 2017 5	Saipa	0 – 2	Tractor	Tehran
20:15 DST+04:30		Report	Azadi 72'; Kiani 91'	Stadium: Shahid Dastgerdi Stadium; Attendance: 2,350

15 September 2017 6	Tractor	1 – 1	Siah Jamegan	Tabriz
19:00 DST+04:30	Hatami 92'	Report	Hashemi 86'	Stadium: Yadegar-e Emam Stadium; Attendance: 20,000

22 September 2017 7	Tractor	1 – 2	Padideh	Tabriz
17:45 DST+04:30	Iranpourian 92'	Report	Ghazi 80'; Khanzadeh 84'	Stadium: Yadegar-e Emam Stadium; Attendance: 7,000

28 September 2017 8	Gostaresh Foulad	1 – 2	Tractor	Tabriz
14:00 DST+03:30	Fakhreddini 89'	Report	Nasr Azadani 48'; Tahami 73'	Stadium: Bonyan Diesel Stadium; Attendance: 2,500

13 October 2017 9	Tractor	1 – 1	Pars Jonoubi	Tabriz
16:00 DST+03:30	Iranpourian 59'	Report	Aghasi 56' (o.g.)	Stadium: Yadegar-e Emam Stadium; Attendance: 10,000

19 October 2017 10	Paykan	2 – 1	Tractor	Tehran
15:45 (DST+03:30)	Garousian 15' (o.g.); Roostaei 90'	Report	Nasr Azadani 64'	Stadium: Shahr-e Qods Stadium; Attendance: 2,000

31 October 2017 11	Tractor	0 – 0	Zob Ahan	Tabriz
15:30 DST+03:30		Report		Stadium: Yadegar-e Emam Stadium; Attendance: 5,000

20 November 2017 12	Sepahan	3 – 0	Tractor	Isfahan
14:45 DST+03:30	Ansari 5' 51'; Karimi 82'	Report		Stadium: Naghsh-e Jahan Stadium; Attendance: 0

25 November 2017 13	Tractor	2 – 1	Sepidrood	Tabriz
15:30 DST+03:30	Hatami 12'; Mehdizadeh 21'	Report	Ebrahimi 40'	Stadium: Yadegar-e Emam Stadium; Attendance: 1,500

1 December 2017 14	Sanat Naft	1 – 1	Tractor	Abadan
16:45 DST+03:30	Jassim 81'	Report	Hatami 69'	Stadium: Takhti Stadium; Attendance: 5,000

6 December 2017 15	Tractor	1 – 1	Foolad	Tabriz
15:00 DST+03:30	Mehdizadeh 74'	Report	Hardani 66'	Stadium: Yadegar-e Emam Stadium; Attendance: 3,100

24 December 2017 16	Tractor	3 – 0	Esteghlal Khuzestan	Tabriz
14:30 DST+03:30	Iranpourian 27'; Alishah 45'; Pahlevan 93'	Report		Stadium: Yadegar-e Emam Stadium; Attendance: 2,000

29 December 2017 17	Persepolis	2 – 0	Tractor	Tehran
14:30 IRST +03:30	Alipour 45'; Kamyabinia 78'	Report	Kiani (yellow card) 30'	Stadium: Azadi Stadium; Attendance: 70.000

5 January 2018 18	Tractor	0 – 0	Esteghlal	Tabriz
14:30 IRST (UTC+03:30)		Report		Stadium: Yadegar-e Emam Stadium; Attendance: 38,000

11 January 2018 19	Naft Tehran	2 – 0	Tractor	Tehran
15:00 DST+03:30	Alekasir 80' 88'	Report		Stadium: Takhti Stadium; Attendance: 500

18 January 2018 20	Tractor	1 – 2	Saipa	Tabriz
14:30 DST+03:30	Iranpourian 70'	Report	Torabi 63' 75'	Stadium: Yadegar-e Emam Stadium; Attendance: 1,500

26 January 2018 21	Siah Jamegan	0 – 0	Tractor	Mashhad
14:30 DST+03:30		Report		Stadium: Imam Reza Stadium; Attendance: 5,000

2 February 2018 22	Padideh	0 – 3	Tractor	Mashhad
14:30 DST+03:30		Report	Mehdipour 51'; Pahlevan 83' 93'	Stadium: Imam Reza Stadium; Attendance: 12,000

7 February 2018 23	Tractor	2 – 1	Gostaresh Foulad	Tabriz
14:15 DST+03:30	Pahlevan 76'; Kiani 94'	Report	Zeneyedpour 33'	Stadium: Yadegar-e Emam Stadium; Attendance: 3,000

24 February 2018 24	Pars Jonoubi	1 – 1	Tractor	Jam
15:30 IRST +03:30	Sing 2'	Report	Pahlevan 62'	Stadium: Takhti Stadium; Attendance: 7,000

1 March 2018 25	Tractor	0 – 1	Paykan	Tabriz
15:00 DST+03:30		Report	Momeni 16'	Stadium: Yadegar-e Emam Stadium; Attendance: 5,000

30 March 2018 26	Zob Ahan	3 – 0	Tractor	Isfahan
17:30 DST+04:30	Hosseini 5'; Tabrizi 80' 89'	Report		Stadium: Foolad Shahr Stadium; Attendance: 1,500

7 April 2018 27	Tractor	1 – 1	Sepahan	Tabriz
18:00 DST+04:30	Esmaeilifar 45'	Report	Sharifi 71'	Stadium: Yadegar-e Emam Stadium; Attendance: 5,000

13 April 2018 28	Sepidrood	1 – 0	Tractor	Rasht
16:00 IRST +04:30	Gholami 25'	Report		Stadium: Sardar Jangal Stadium; Attendance: 15.000

22 April 2018 29	Tractor	1 – 1	Sanat Naft	Tabriz
18:00 DST+04:30	Esmaeilifar 59'	Report	César 37'	Stadium: Yadegar-e Emam Stadium; Attendance: 1,000

27 April 2018 30	Foolad	0 – 1	Tractor	Ahvaz
17:00 DST+04:30		Report	Pahlevan 79'	Stadium: Ghadir Stadium; Attendance: 1,000

=== Hazfi Cup ===
==== Matches ====
Win Draw Loss Postponed

Date Round	Home	Score	Away	Location

7 September 2017 Round of 32	Padideh	1 – 2	Tractor	Mashhad
18:15 DST+04:30	Abbasian 70'		Sharifi 87'; Iranpourian 90'	Stadium: Samen Stadium; Attendance: 1,200; Referee: Mohammad Hossein Zahedifar

26 October 2017 Round of 16	Tractor	5 – 2 (a.e.t.)	Fajr Sepasi	Tabriz
17:00	Sharifi 71', 90+1', 105', 116'; Hatami 92'		Shojaeian 32'; Heydari 76'	Stadium: Yadegar-e Emam; Attendance: 500

19 December 2017 Quarter-finals	Esteghlal Khuzestan	0–0 (a.e.t.) (4–3 p)	Tractor	Ahvaz
14:30				Stadium: Ghadir Stadium; Attendance: 500

=== AFC Champions League ===
==== Group stage ====
Pos	Team	Pld	W	D	L	GF	GA	GD	Pts	Qualification
1	(Saudi Arabia) Al-Ahli	6	4	2	0	9	4	+5	14	Advance to knockout stage
2	(United Arab Emirates) Al-Jazira	6	2	2	2	9	9	0	8 (Note: Head-to-head results: Al-Jazira 3–2 Al-Gharafa, Al-Gharafa 2–3 Al-Jazira.)	Advance to knockout stage
3	(Qatar) Al-Gharafa	6	2	2	2	12	9	+3	8	
4	(Iran) Tractor Sazi	6	0	2	4	2	10	−8	2	

Source: AFC
Rules for classification: Group stage tiebreakers
Notes:

Win Draw Loss Postponed

Date Round	Home	Score	Away	Location

12 February 2018 1	Tractor (Iran)	0 – 1	(Saudi Arabia) Al-Ahli	Seeb (Oman)
19:30 UTC+4		http://www.the-afc.com/competitions/afc-champions-league/matches/2018/963976 Live Report]	Assiri 67'	Stadium: Al-Seeb Stadium; Attendance: 1,253; Referee: Jumpei Iida (Japan)

19 February 2018 2	Al-Gharafa (Qatar)	3 – 0	(Iran) Tractor	Al Rayyan
18:00 UTC+3	Taremi 11', 90+4'; Gregov 21' (o.g.)	http://www.the-afc.com/competitions/afc-champions-league/matches/2018/963977 Live Report]		Stadium: Thani bin Jassim Stadium; Attendance: 2,833; Referee: Liu Kwok Man (Hong Kong)

5 March 2018 3	Al-Jazira (United Arab Emirates)	0 – 0	(Iran) Tractor	Abu Dhabi
19:00 UTC+4		http://www.the-afc.com/competitions/afc-champions-league/matches/2018/963980 Live Report]		Stadium: Mohammed bin Zayed Stadium; Attendance: 3,360; Referee: Kim Dong-jin (South Korea)

13 March 2018 4	Tractor (Iran)	1 – 1	(United Arab Emirates) Al-Jazira	Tabriz
16:00 UTC+3:30	Hatami 78'	http://www.the-afc.com/competitions/afc-champions-league/matches/2018/963982 Live Report]	Romarinho 44'	Stadium: Yadegar-e Emam Stadium; Attendance: 41,520; Referee: Fu Ming (China)

3 April 2018 5	Al-Ahli (Saudi Arabia)	2 – 0	(Iran) Tractor	Al Ain (United Arab Emirates)
20:20 UTC+4	Assiri 49'; Zakaria 90+2'	http://www.the-afc.com/competitions/afc-champions-league/matches/2018/963984 Live Report]		Stadium: Tahnoun bin Mohammed Stadium; Attendance: 100; Referee: Peter Green (Australia)

17 April 2018 6	Tractor (Iran)	1 – 3	(Qatar) Al-Gharafa	Tabriz
19:00 UTC+4:30	Iranpourian 31' (pen.)	http://www.the-afc.com/competitions/afc-champions-league/matches/2018/963986 Live Report]	Hassan 70'; Hatem 76'; Taremi 87'	Stadium: Yadegar-e Emam Stadium; Attendance: 1,500; Referee: Ali Sabah (Iraq)

== Statistics ==
=== Squad statistics ===
As of 27 April 2018

No.	Pos	Nat	Player	Total		Persian Gulf Pro League		Hazfi Cup		Champions League	
No.	Pos	Nat	Player	Apps	Goals	Apps	Goals	Apps	Goals	Apps	Goals
1	GK	(Iran) IRI	Farzin Garousian	23	0	19	0	3	0	1	0
2	DF	(Iran) IRI	Mohammad Iranpourian	35	8	27	6	3	1	5	1
3	DF	(Iran) IRI	Reza Sharbati	18	0	14	0	1	0	3	0
5	DF	(Croatia) CRO	Šime Gregov	1	0	0	0	0	0	1	0
6	MF	(Iran) IRI	Mehdi Kiani	30	2	22	2	2	0	6	0
7	MF	(Iran) IRI	Omid Alishah	4	1	3	1	1	0	0	0
8	DF	(Iran) IRI	Danial Esmaeilifar	18	2	12	2	1	0	5	0
9	MF	(Iran) IRI	Mehdi Mehdipour	20	1	14	1	1	0	5	0
10	FW	(Iran) IRI	Mohammad Ebrahimi	29	0	22	0	2	0	5	0
15	FW	(Iran) IRI	Ehsan Pahlavan	17	6	12	6	1	0	4	0
16	DF	(Iran) IRI	Mohammadreza Mehdizadeh	36	2	27	2	3	0	6	0
17	FW	(Iran) IRI	Amir Arsalan Motahari	18	0	12	0	0	0	6	0
18	FW	(Bosnia and Herzegovina) BIH	Sulejman Krpić	10	0	5	0	0	0	5	0
19	FW	(Iran) IRI	Mohammad Reza Azadi	33	1	27	1	3	0	3	0
23	DF	(Iran) IRI	Aref Aghasi	14	0	10	0	1	0	3	0
24	FW	(Iran) IRI	Farzad Hatami	30	6	23	4	3	1	4	1
27	FW	(Iran) IRI	Fakher Tahami	14	1	11	1	2	0	1	0
28	DF	(Iran) IRI	Mohammad Naderi	34	0	25	0	3	0	6	0
29	FW	(Iran) IRI	Reza Abdi	2	0	2	0	0	0	0	0
30	MF	(Iran) IRI	Amir Asadzadeh	7	0	6	0	1	0	0	0
32	FW	(Iran) IRI	Hamed Hosseinalizadeh	6	0	6	0	0	0	0	0
33	GK	(Iran) IRI	Mahdi Mohammadian	0	0	0	0	0	0	0	0
34	DF	(Iran) IRI	Jafar Dehghan	0	0	0	0	0	0	0	0
38	DF	(Iran) IRI	Amir Mehdi Janmaleki	1	0	1	0	0	0	0	0
40	DF	(Iran) IRI	Ali Esmaeili	3	0	3	0	0	0	0	0
44	GK	(Brazil) BRA	Jordi Almeida	16	0	11	0	0	0	5	0
66	MF	(Iran) IRI	Sina Ashouri	5	0	5	0	0	0	0	0
70	DF	(Iran) IRI	Amir Reza Nasr Azadani	15	2	13	2	2	0	0	0
77	DF	(Iran) IRI	Mohammad Moslemipour	16	0	11	0	1	0	4	0
88	MF	(Iran) IRI	Ali Taheran	26	0	20	0	2	0	4	0
99	MF	(Iran) IRI	Ghaem Eslamikhah	4	0	4	0	0	0	0	0
Players transferred out during the season
11	FW	(Iran) IRI	Shahram Goudarzi	9	0	9	0	0	0	0	0
14	MF	(Iran) IRI	Mohammad Nouri	12	0	11	0	1	0	0	0
47	FW	(Iran) IRI	Mehdi Sharifi	15	5	13	0	2	5	0	0

Last updated: 27 April 2018
Source: Competitions

=== Goals ===
As of 27 April 2018

Rank	No.	Pos.	Nat.	Name	Pro League	Hazfi Cup	AFC CL	Total
1	2	DF	(Iran)	Mohammad Iranpourian	6	1	1	8
2	15	FW	(Iran)	Ehsan Pahlavan	6	0	0	6
2	24	FW	(Iran)	Farzad Hatami	4	1	1	6
3	47	FW	(Iran)	Mehdi Sharifi	0	5	0	5
4	70	DF	(Iran)	Amir Reza Nasr Azadani	2	0	0	2
4	8	DF	(Iran)	Danial Esmaeilifar	2	0	0	2
4	6	MF	(Iran)	Mehdi Kiani	2	0	0	2
4	16	DF	(Iran)	Mohammadreza Mehdizadeh	2	0	0	2
5	27	FW	(Iran)	Fakher Tahami	1	0	0	1
5	9	MF	(Iran)	Mehdi Mehdipour	1	0	0	1
5	19	FW	(Iran)	Mohammad Reza Azadi	1	0	0	1
5	7	MF	(Iran)	Omid Alishah	1	0	0	1
Total					28	7	2	37

=== Clean sheets ===
Rank	Name	Pro League	Hazfi Cup	AFC CL	Total
1	(Iran) Farzin Garousian	4	1	0	5
2	(Brazil) Jordi Almeida	3	0	1	4
Total		7	1	1	9

== See also ==
- 2017–18 Iran Pro League
- 2017–18 Hazfi Cup
