= 2020–21 Tractor S.C. season =

Tractor
2020–21 season
- Owner: Mohammad Reza Zonuzi
- Chairman: Mir Masoum Sohrabi (until 30 September 2020); Mohammad Alipour (From 1 October 2020 until 15 November 2020); Sajjad Sayyah (From 22 November 2020 until 11 May 2021); Jamshid Nazmi (from 24 June 2021)
- Manager: Alireza Mansourian (until 8 December 2020); Masoud Shojaei (interim, until 18 February 2021); Rasoul Khatibi (From 20 February 2021 until 28 June 2021); Firouz Karimi (from 29 June 2021)
- Stadium: Yadegar-e Emam Stadium; Shahid Qasem Soleimani Stadium
- Pro League: 4th
- Hazfi Cup: Round of 16
- Iranian Super Cup: Runners-up
- AFC Champions League: Round of 16
- Top goalscorer: League: Mohammad Abbaszadeh (12); All: Mohammad Abbaszadeh (16)
Home colours	Away colours

The 2020–21 season marked Tractor Sport Club's 13th season in the Pro League, and their 12th consecutive season in the top division of Iranian Football. They are also competing in the Hazfi Cup, Super Cup and AFC Champions League.

== First team squad ==
As of 1 November 2020.

No.	Name	Nationality	Position (s)	Date of birth (age)	Signed from
Goalkeepers
1	Mohammad Reza Akhbari	(Iran)	GK	February 15, 1993 (aged 27)	(Iran) Saipa
33	Habib Far Abbasi	(Iran)	GK	September 4, 1997 (aged 23)	(Iran) Naft Masjed Soleyman
69	Reza Seyf Ahmadi ^{U23}	(Iran)	GK	March 28, 1999 (aged 21)	(Iran) Tractor U21
Defenders
3	Mohammad Reza Khanzadeh	(Iran)	CB	January 20, 1992 (aged 28)	(Qatar) Al Ahli
4	Hadi Mohammadi	(Iran)	CB	March 8, 1991 (aged 29)	(Iran) Zob Ahan
14	Meysam Teymouri	(Iran)	LB	July 6, 1992 (aged 28)	(Iran) Esteghlal
15	Vafa Hakhamaneshi	(Iran)	CB	May 27, 1991 (aged 29)	(Iran) Zob Ahan
28	Ehsan Hajsafi	(Iran)	LB, CDM, LM	February 25, 1990 (aged 30)	(Greece) Olympiacos
34	Milad Fakhreddini	(Iran)	RB, RM	May 26, 1990 (aged 30)	(Iran) Zob Ahan
77	Mohammad Moslemipour	(Iran)	LB	May 25, 1997 (aged 23)	(Iran) Machine Sazi
Midfielders
6	Akbar Imani	(Iran)	DM, CM	March 21, 1992 (aged 28)	(Iran) Sanat Naft
7	Masoud Shojaei	(Iran)	AM, CM, RW, LW	June 9, 1984 (aged 36)	(Greece) AEK Athens
8	Saeid Mehri	(Iran)	CM, AM	September 16, 1995 (aged 25)	(Iran) Machine Sazi
11	Mehdi Tikdari	(Iran)	RM, RB, RW	June 13, 1996 (aged 24)	(Iran) Mes Kerman
21	Ashkan Dejagah	(Iran)	AM, RW, LW	July 5, 1986 (aged 34)	(England) Nottingham Forest
30	Saeed Vasei	(Iran)	AM, RW	December 19, 1994 (aged 26)	(Iran) Paykan
48	Mohammad Khorram	(Iran)	CM, AM	April 7, 1997 (aged 23)	(Iran) Machine Sazi
66	Hamid Bou Hamdan	(Iran)	DM, CM	March 13, 1989 (aged 31)	(Iran) Zob Ahan
Forwards
10	Okacha Hamzaoui	(Algeria)	ST, LW	November 12, 1990 (aged 30)	(Algeria) Bel Abbès
20	Mehdi Babri ^{U23}	(Iran)	RW, ST, LW	October 28, 1998 (aged 22)	(Iran) Tractor U19
23	Mohammad Abbaszadeh	(Iran)	ST	May 9, 1990 (aged 30)	(Iran) Nassaji Mazandaran
24	Mohammad Mehdi Ghanbari ^{U23}	(Iran)	RW, LW, AM	April 26, 1998 (aged 22)	(Iran) Khooshe Talaei
70	Amin Asadi	(Iran)	ST, LW, RW		(Iran) Arman Gohar
99	Mohammad Ghaderi ^{U21}	(Iran)	LW, RW, AM	February 27, 2000 (aged 20)	(Iran) Machine Sazi

== Transfers ==
=== Summer ===
In:

No.	Pos.	Nation	Player
30	DF	IRN	Abolfazl Razzaghpour (Loan return from Shahin Bushehr)
—	MF	IRN	Mohammad Ghaderi (from Machine Sazi)
—	DF	IRN	Mohammed Ghanbari (from Khooshe Talaei)
—	DF	IRN	Mohammad Moslemipour (from Machine Sazi)
—	DF	IRN	Hadi Mohammadi (from Zob Ahan)
—	DF	IRN	Vafa Hakhamaneshi (from Zob Ahan)
—	MF	IRN	Mohammad Khorram (from Machine Sazi)
—	FW	IRN	Amin Assadi (from Arman Gohar)
—	GK	IRN	Habib Far Abbasi (from Naft MIS)
—	MF	IRN	Saeed Vasei (from Paykan)
—	MF	IRN	Mohammad Eslami^{U23} (from Esteghlal)
—	FW	IRN	Mohammad Abbaszadeh (from Nassaji Mazandaran)
—	MF	IRN	Hamid Bou Hamdan (from Zob Ahan)

Out:

No.	Pos.	Nation	Player
9	MF	IRN	Reza Asadi (to (Austria) St. Pölten)
1	GK	IRN	Mohammad Rashid Mazaheri (to Esteghlal)
30	DF	IRN	Abolfazl Razzaghpour (On loan to Machine Sazi)
16	FW	IRN	Mohammad Reza Azadi (to (Greece) Panetolikos)
10	FW	IRN	Sasan Ansari (to Foolad)
4	DF	IRN	Iman Salimi (Unattached)

== Competitions ==
=== Overview ===
Competition	First match	Last match	Starting round	Final position	Record							
Competition	First match	Last match	Starting round	Final position	Pld	W	D	L	GF	GA	GD	Win %
Pro League	6 November 2020	30 July 2021	–	4th	30	12	9	9	35	29	+6	40.00
Hazfi Cup	12 March 2021	19 May 2021	Round of 32	Round of 16	2	1	0	1	3	2	+1	50.00
Super Cup	20 June 2021		Final	Runners-up	1	0	0	1	0	1	−1	0.00
AFC Champions League	14 April 2021	14 September 2021	Group stage	Round of 16	7	2	4	1	6	4	+2	28.57
Total					40	15	13	12	44	36	+8	37.50

Last updated: 14 September 2021.
Source: Competitions

=== Persian Gulf Pro League ===
==== Standings ====
Pos	Team	Pld	W	D	L	GF	GA	GD	Pts	Qualification or relegation
2	Sepahan	30	19	8	3	53	24	+29	65	Qualification for 2022 AFC Champions League group stage
3	Esteghlal (Note: Persepolis and Esteghlal did not obtain an AFC license. Therefore, even if they earn the right to play in Asian competitions based on league position, they will not be able to participate.)	30	16	8	6	36	19	+17	56	
4	Tractor	30	12	9	9	35	29	+6	45	
5	Gol Gohar	30	13	6	11	33	32	+1	45	
6	Foolad	30	10	14	6	27	18	+9	44	Qualification for 2022 AFC Champions League group stage (Note: Foolad qualified to AFC Champions League by winning the Hazfi Cup)

Updated to match(es) played on 30 July 2021. Source: IPL Table, Soccerway
Rules for classification: 1) Points; 2) Goal difference; 3) Goals scored.

==== Results summary ====
Overall								Home						Away					
Pld	W	D	L	GF	GA	GD	Pts	W	D	L	GF	GA	GD	W	D	L	GF	GA	GD
30	12	9	9	35	29	+6	45	6	5	4	16	10	+6	6	4	5	19	19	0

Last updated: 30 July 2021.
Source: Ipl Stats

==== Results by round ====
Round	1	2	3	4	5	6	7	8	9	10	11	12	13	14	15	16	17	18	19	20	21	22	23	24	25	26	27	28	29	30
Ground	H	A	H	A	H	A	H	A	H	A	H	A	H	H	A	A	H	A	H	A	H	A	H	A	H	A	H	A	A	H
Result	D	D	L	W	D	W	W	L	D	W	L	W	L	L	W	D	W	L	D	D	W	D	D	L	W	L	W	W	L	W
Position	8	11	13	10	12	8	3	7	7	5	5	5	6	7	7	7	5	5	5	7	6	6	7	7	5	8	5	4	6	4

Updated to match(es) played on 30 July 2021. Source: "Ipl".
A = Away; H = Home; W = Win; D = Draw; L = Loss; P = Postponed

==== Matches ====
Win Draw Loss Postponed

6 November 2020 1	Tractor	0–0	Naft Masjed Soleyman	Tabriz
16:45 IRST (UTC+03:30)	Mehri (yellow card) 28'; Hakhamaneshi (yellow card) 43'; Hajsafi (yellow card) 90'	Report	Bolboli (yellow card) 90'; Moghtadaei (yellow card) 90+7'	Stadium: Yadegar-e Emam Stadium; Attendance: 0 Referee: Mehdi Seyedali

19 November 2020 2	Nassaji Mazandaran	1–1	Tractor	Qaem Shahr
16:10 IRST (UTC+03:30)	Bijan (yellow card) 27'; Gholamalibeygi (yellow card) 45'; Kalantari 69'; Shahalidoost (yellow card) 83'	Report	Hakhamaneshi (yellow card) 14'; Imani (yellow card) 44'; Dejagah 82'	Stadium: Vatani Stadium; Attendance: 0 Referee: Reza Kermanshahi

27 November 2020 3	Tractor	0–1	Sepahan	Tabriz
15:15 IRST (UTC+03:30)	Imani (yellow card) 57'; Mohammadi (yellow card) 84'	Report	Nejadmehdi 28'; Karimi (yellow card) 31'; Rafiei (yellow card) 38'	Stadium: Yadegar-e Emam Stadium; Attendance: 0 Referee: Bijan Heydari

2 December 2020 4	Mes Rafsanjan	0–1	Tractor	Rafsanjan
16:10 IRST (UTC+03:30)	Zahedi (yellow card) 36'	Report	Abbaszadeh 85'; Akhbari (yellow card) 90+5'; Dejagah (yellow card) 90+6'	Stadium: Shohadaye Mes Rafsanjan Stadium; Attendance: 0 Referee: Mohammad Reza Tarokh

7 December 2020 5	Tractor	0–0	Foolad	Tabriz
15:00 IRST (UTC+03:30)	Teymouri (yellow card) 31'; BouHamdan (yellow card) 50'; Mohammadi (yellow card) 67'; Fakhreddini (yellow card) 83'; Imani (yellow card) 85'	Report	Mousavi (yellow card) 11'; Abshak (yellow card) 60'	Stadium: Shahid Qasem Soleimani Stadium; Attendance: 0 Referee: Mohammadreza Akbarian

13 December 2020 6	Machine Sazi	0–1	Tractor	Tabriz
15:00 IRST (UTC+03:30)	Afaghi (yellow card) 51'; Salari (yellow card) 69'	Report	Tikdari (yellow card) 45+1'; Ghanbari 90+3'	Stadium: Yadegar-e Emam Stadium; Attendance: 0 Referee: Yaser Hamrang

18 December 2020 7	Tractor	3–1	Paykan	Tabriz
15:45 IRST (UTC+03:30)	Tikdari 21'; Dejagah 22'; Abbaszadeh 39'; Mohammadi (yellow card) 56'	Report	Jabireh 27', (yellow card) 45+2'	Stadium: Yadegar-e Emam Stadium; Attendance: 0 Referee: Ali Safaei

24 December 2020 8	Sanat Naft	2–1	Tractor	Abadan
16:45 IRST (UTC+03:30)	Khaleghifar 4', (yellow card) 5'; Hanafi (yellow card) 17'; Rikani (yellow card) 43'; Fallahzadeh (yellow card) 75'; Mohammadi 90+2' (o.g.)	Report	Abbaszadeh 45+2'; Dejagah (yellow card) 73'; Asadi (yellow card) 87'; Imani (yellow card) 88'	Stadium: Takhti Stadium; Attendance: 0 Referee: Payam Heydari

30 December 2020 9	Tractor	0–0	Shahr Khodrou	Tabriz
16:40 IRST (UTC+03:30)	Hakhamaneshi (yellow card) 19'; BouHamdan (yellow card) 43'; Fakhreddini (yellow card) 51'	Report	Nemati (yellow card) 56'; Jalali Rad (yellow card) 90+4'	Stadium: Yadegar-e Emam Stadium; Attendance: 0 Referee: Seyed Reza Mahdavi

5 January 2021 10	Zob Ahan	1–2	Tractor	Isfahan
15:00 IRST (UTC+03:30)	Momeni (yellow card) 20'; Dashti (yellow card) 38'; Marković 79'; Ghanbari (yellow card) 90'; Akasheh (yellow card) 90+3'	Report	Abbaszadeh 25', 82'; Fakhreddini (yellow card) 27'; BouHamdan (yellow card) 79'	Stadium: Foolad Shahr Stadium; Attendance: 0 Referee: Hassan Akrami

18 January 2021 11	Tractor	1–3	Esteghlal	Tabriz
14:30 IRST (UTC+03:30)	Mehri (yellow card) 53'; Fakhreddini (yellow card) 63'; Abbaszadeh 81'	Report	Rigi (yellow card) 35'; Shojaeian (yellow card) 36'; Diabaté 38', 65'; Ghayedi 60'; Naderi (yellow card) 81'	Stadium: Yadegar-e Emam Stadium; Attendance: 0 Referee: Bijan Heydari

23 January 2021 12	Gol Gohar	1–2	Tractor	Sirjan
15:00 IRST (UTC+03:30)	Alizadeh (yellow card) 57'; Mensha (yellow card) 62'; Shakeri 64'; Sohrabian (red card) 90+8'	Report	Hajsafi 44', (yellow card) 53'; Hakhamaneshi (yellow card) 62'; Far Abbasi (yellow card) 62'; Abbaszadeh 76'; Mehri (red card) 90+8'	Stadium: Imam Ali Stadium; Attendance: 0 Referee: Ashkan Khorshidi

30 January 2021 13	Tractor	0–1	Aluminium	Tabriz
15:00 IRST (UTC+03:30)	Khanzadeh (yellow card) 15'; Fakhreddini (yellow card) 31'; Moslemipour (yellow card) 45+4'; BouHamdan (yellow card) 90+5'	Report	Singh (yellow card) 28', (goal) 44' (pen.); Pakdel (yellow card) 45+4'; Hosseini (yellow card) 52'; Ahmadi (yellow card) 90+5'	Stadium: Yadegar-e Emam Stadium; Attendance: 0 Referee: Komeil Gholami

4 February 2021 14	Tractor	0–1	Persepolis	Tabriz
15:00 IRST (UTC+03:30)	Fakhreddini (yellow card) 8'; Imani (yellow card) 57'; Ghaderi (yellow card) 90+3'	Report	Hosseini 53'; Aghaei (yellow card) 65'; Lak (yellow card) 69'	Stadium: Yadegar-e Emam Stadium; Attendance: 0 Referee: Mehdi Seyedali

14 February 2021 15	Saipa	1–2	Tractor	Tehran
15:00 IRST (UTC+03:30)	Heydari 8'; Maleki (yellow card) 45'; Aliyari (yellow card) 50'; Haji Eydi (yellow card) 70'	Report	Hajsafi (yellow card) 34'; Khanzadeh 45+3', (yellow card) 78'; BouHamdan 45+6'; Tikdari (yellow card) 88'	Stadium: Shahid Dastgerdi Stadium; Attendance: 0 Referee: Abbas Raki

1 March 2021 16	Naft Masjed Soleyman	1–1	Tractor	Masjed Soleyman
15:00 IRST (UTC+03:30)	Bolboli (yellow card) 22'; Moghtadaei (yellow card) 24' (red card) 24'; Jafari 76'; Kermanshahi (yellow card) 90+2'	Report	Abbaszadeh (yellow card) 42', (goal) 90+3'; Imani (yellow card) 73'	Stadium: Behnam Mohammadi Stadium; Attendance: 0 Referee: Mouood Bonyadifar

6 March 2021 17	Tractor	2–1	Nassaji Mazandaran	Tabriz
15:30 IRST (UTC+03:30)	Abbaszadeh 22'; Teymouri 45+3', (yellow card) 45+3'	Report	Ghaed Rahmati 12', (yellow card) 44'; Aghaei (yellow card) 90+3'	Stadium: Yadegar-e Emam Stadium; Attendance: 0 Referee: Morteza Mansourian

18 March 2021 18	Sepahan	2–0	Tractor	Isfahan
15:30 IRST (UTC+03:30)	Shahbazzadeh 19'; Mohebi (yellow card) 55'; Salmani 81'; Rafiei (yellow card) 88'; Karimi (yellow card) 90+4'	Report	Imani (yellow card) 58' (yellow-red card) 61'; Babaei (penalty missed) 70'; Fakhreddini (yellow card) 84'	Stadium: Naghsh-e Jahan Stadium; Attendance: 0 Referee: Payam Heydari

3 April 2021 19	Tractor	0–0	Mes Rafsanjan	Tabriz
17:00 IRDT (UTC+04:30)		Report	M. Rezaei (yellow card) 45+3'	Stadium: Yadegar-e Emam Stadium; Attendance: 0 Referee: Reza Adel

24 May 2021 20	Foolad	1–1	Tractor	Ahvaz
20:45 IRDT (UTC+04:30)	Ansari 3'; Miri (yellow card) 28'; Hardani (yellow card) 79'	Report	Razzaghpour 34'; Akhbari (yellow card) 74'; Khorram (yellow card) 87'	Stadium: Foolad Arena; Attendance: 0 Referee: Mohammad Hossein Torabian

29 May 2021 21	Tractor	2–0	Machine Sazi	Tabriz
19:00 IRDT (UTC+04:30)	Nariman Jahan 34'; Ghaderi (yellow card) 62'; Fakhreddini 75'	Report	Asadi (yellow card) 27' (yellow-red card) 69'	Stadium: Shahid Qasem Soleimani Stadium; Attendance: 0 Referee: Nasser Jangi

9 May 2021 22	Paykan	1–1	Tractor	Qods
21:20 IRDT (UTC+04:30)	Darvishi 51'; Ghorbankhani (yellow card) 62'; Eidi (yellow card) 73'	Report	Tikdari 10'; Mohammadi (yellow card) 48'	Stadium: Shahr-e Qods Stadium; Attendance: 0 Referee: Ali Asghar Momeni

14 May 2021 23	Tractor	1–1	Sanat Naft	Tabriz
18:30 IRDT (UTC+04:30)	Keshavarzi (yellow card) 44'; Ghaderi 62'; Tikdari (yellow card) 75'; Razzaghpour (yellow card) 87'	Report	Khaleghifar (yellow card) 80'; Rikani 89' (pen.)	Stadium: Yadegar-e Emam Stadium; Attendance: 0 Referee: Mohammad Hossein Zahedifar

26 June 2021 24	Shahr Khodrou	2–1	Tractor	Mashhad
20:30 IRDT (UTC+04:30)	Nemati (yellow card) 8' (red card) 20'; Vakia (yellow card) 15'; Mehraban (yellow card) 51'; A.H. Karimi (yellow card) 63'; Ghaseminejad 86' (pen.); Farahani (yellow card) 88'	Report	Fakhreddini (yellow card) 8'; Fathi 70'	Stadium: Imam Reza Stadium; Attendance: 0 Referee: Amir Arab Baraghi

30 June 2021 25	Tractor	1–0	Zob Ahan	Tabriz
19:15 IRDT (UTC+04:30)	Abbaszadeh (penalty missed) 13', 13'; Teymouri (yellow card) 36'; Fakhreddini (yellow card) 65'; Imani (yellow card) 78'; Tikdari (yellow card) 78'; Keshavarzi (yellow card) 90+6'	Report	Gordan (yellow card) 45+4'	Stadium: Shahid Qasem Soleimani Stadium; Attendance: 0 Referee: Yaser Hamrang

6 July 2021 26	Esteghlal	2–1	Tractor	Tehran
19:15 IRDT (UTC+04:30)	Naderi (yellow card) 45+7'; Ghayedi 54', 59'; Gholami (yellow card) 73'	Report	Abbaszadeh (yellow card) 37'; Akhbari (yellow card) 55'; Ghaderi (yellow card) 90'; Salami (yellow card) 90+1'; Asadi 90+3'	Stadium: Azadi Stadium; Attendance: 0 Referee: Payam Heydari

10 July 2021 27	Tractor	1–0	Gol Gohar	Tabriz
20:15 IRDT (UTC+04:30)	Mohammadi (yellow card) 63'; Babaei (yellow card) 75': Abbaszadeh 90+7'	Report	Sadeghi (yellow card) 18'; Aghajanpour (yellow card) 23'; Ashouri (yellow card) 69' (yellow-red card) 85'; Arta (yellow card) 90+11'	Stadium: Shahid Qasem Soleimani Stadium; Attendance: 0 Referee: Reza Kermanshahi

20 July 2021 28	Aluminium	1–3	Tractor	Arak
21:15 IRDT (UTC+04:30)	Aghakhan 88' (pen.); Nouri (yellow card) 90+7'	Report	Salami 35', (yellow card) 58'; Tikdari 45+2'; Fakhreddini (yellow card) 73'; Abbaszadeh 90+8'	Stadium: Imam Khomeini Stadium; Attendance: 0 Referee: Ali Safaei

25 July 2021 29	Persepolis	3–1	Tractor	Tehran
21:15 IRDT (UTC+04:30)	Moghanlou (yellow card) 21'; Abdi 64', 90+4'; Nourollahi 68'	Report	Babaei 50'; Salami (yellow card) 58'; Razzaghpour (yellow card) 70'; Irankhah (yellow card) 80'	Stadium: Azadi Stadium; Attendance: 0 Referee: Mohammad Hossein Zahedifar

30 July 2021 30	Tractor	5–1	Saipa	Tabriz
21:15 IRDT (UTC+04:30)	Vasei 13'; Nariman Jahan 28'; BouHamdan (yellow card) 39'; Fakhreddini 45'; Fathi 69'; Babaei 88'; Teymouri (yellow card) 90+1'	Report	Mahini 31' (pen.)	Stadium: Shahid Qasem Soleimani Stadium; Attendance: 0 Referee: Ali Asghar Momeni

=== Hazfi Cup ===
12 March 2021 Round of 32	Tractor	3–0	Shahrdari Mahshahr	Tabriz
15:30 IRST (UTC+03:30)		Report		Stadium: Yadegar-e Emam Stadium; Referee: Saeid Vafapisheh
Note: Shahdari Mahshahr were unable to travel to Tabriz, therefore Tractor progressed to the next round.

19 May 2021 Round of 16	Aluminium Arak	2–0	Tractor	Arak
18:00 IRDT (UTC+04:30)	Majidi (yellow card) 2', (goal) 81' (pen.); Houshmand 25'; Abbasian (yellow card) 41'; Pakdel (yellow card) 45+1'; Monazzemi (yellow card) 74'; Aria Kia (yellow card) 90'	Report	Fakhreddini (yellow card) 6'; Mohammadi (yellow card) 17' (yellow-red card) 58'; Razzaghpour (yellow card) 69'; Tikdari (yellow card) 85'; BouHamdan (yellow card) 90'	Stadium: Imam Khomeini Stadium; Referee: Yaser Hamrang

=== Super Cup ===
20 June 2021 Final	Persepolis	1–0	Tractor	Tehran
20:00 IRST +03:30	Aghaei (yellow card) 55'; Alekasir 61'; Moghanlou (yellow card) 81'	Report	Fakhreddini (yellow card) 45+2'; Ghaderi (yellow card) 72'; Tikdari (red card) 78'	Stadium: Azadi Stadium; Referee: Ali Safaei
Note: Due to the COVID-19 pandemic in Iran, the match was played behind closed doors.

=== AFC Champions League ===
==== Group stage ====
Pos	Team	Pld	W	D	L	GF	GA	GD	Pts	Qualification	SHA	TRA	PAK	QWJ
1	(United Arab Emirates) Sharjah (H)	6	3	2	1	9	6	+3	11	Advance to Round of 16	—	0–2	4–1	1–0
2	(Iran) Tractor	6	2	4	0	6	3	+3	10	Advance to Round of 16	0–0	—	0–0	1–0
3	(Uzbekistan) Pakhtakor	6	1	4	1	6	8	−2	7		1–1	3–3	—	1–0
4	(Iraq) Al-Quwa Al-Jawiya	6	0	2	4	2	6	−4	2		2–3	0–0	0–0	—

Source: AFC
Rules for classification: Tiebreakers
(H) Hosts

14 April 2021 1	Pakhtakor (Uzbekistan)	3–3	(Iran) Tractor	Sharjah, United Arab Emirates
19:00 UTC+4	Ismailov (yellow card) 52'; Ćeran 69'; Mukhiddinov 75'; Erkinov 82'; Krimets (yellow card) 84'	Live Report; Stats Report	Khanzadeh (yellow card) 23'; Dejagah 53', (yellow card) 78'; Abbaszadeh 56', 85' (pen.); Teymouri (yellow card) 82'; Ghaderi (yellow card) 90+4'	Stadium: Sharjah Stadium; Referee: Jumpei Iida (Japan)

17 April 2021 2	Tractor (Iran)	0–0	(United Arab Emirates) Sharjah	Sharjah, United Arab Emirates
22:00 UTC+4	Nariman Jahan (yellow card) 28'	Live Report; Stats Report		Stadium: Sharjah Stadium; Referee: Ma Ning (China)

20 April 2021 3	Al-Quwa Al-Jawiya (Iraq)	0–0	(Iran) Tractor	Sharjah, United Arab Emirates
19:00 UTC+4	Bayesh (yellow card) 34'; Kazem (yellow card) 78'	Live Report; Stats Report	Teymouri (yellow card) 63'	Stadium: Sharjah Stadium; Referee: Ahmed Al-Kaf (Oman)

23 April 2021 4	Tractor (Iran)	1–0	(Iraq) Al-Quwa Al-Jawiya	Sharjah, United Arab Emirates
19:00 UTC+4	Tikdari 2'; Moslemipour (yellow card) 24'; Babaei (yellow card) 90+3'	Live Report; Stats Report	Jabbar (red card) 38'; Al Ani (yellow card) 42'; Raed Matrook (yellow card) 86'	Stadium: Sharjah Stadium; Referee: Jumpei Iida (Japan)

26 April 2021 5	Tractor (Iran)	0–0	(Uzbekistan) Pakhtakor	Sharjah, United Arab Emirates
19:00 UTC+4	Dejagah (yellow card) 18'	Live Report; Stats Report		Stadium: Sharjah Stadium; Referee: Hussein Abo Yehia (Lebanon)

29 April 2021 6	Sharjah (United Arab Emirates)	0–2	(Iran) Tractor	Sharjah, United Arab Emirates
22:00 UTC+4	Martins Pereira (yellow card) 43'	Live Report; Stats Report	Abbaszadeh 7', 66'; Babaei (yellow card) 32'	Stadium: Sharjah Stadium; Referee: Jumpei Iida (Japan)

== Statistics ==
=== Squad statistics ===
No.	Pos	Nat	Player	Total		Pro League		Hazfi Cup		ACL		Super Cup	
No.	Pos	Nat	Player	Apps	Goals	Apps	Goals	Apps	Goals	Apps	Goals	Apps	Goals
1	GK	(Iran)	Mohammad Reza Akhbari	37	0	28	0	1	0	7	0	1	0
2	DF	(Iran)	Abolfazl Razzaghpour	18	1	11	1	0	0	6	0	1	0
3	DF	(Iran)	Mohammad Reza Khanzadeh	19	1	12	1	0	0	6	0	1	0
4	DF	(Iran)	Hadi Mohammadi	27	0	18	0	1	0	7	0	1	0
5	DF	(Iran)	Peyman Keshavarzi	7	0	4	0	0	0	3	0	0	0
6	MF	(Iran)	Akbar Imani	35	0	27	0	1	0	6	0	1	0
7	MF	(Iran)	Masoud Shojaei	13	0	12	0	0	0	1	0	0	0
8	MF	(Iran)	Saeid Mehri	13	0	13	0	0	0	0	0	0	0
10	FW	(Algeria)	Okacha Hamzaoui	11	0	11	0	0	0	0	0	0	0
11	FW	(Iran)	Mehdi Tikdari	34	4	26	3	1	0	6	1	1	0
14	DF	(Iran)	Meysam Teymouri	33	2	26	2	1	0	5	0	1	0
15	DF	(Iran)	Vafa Hakhamaneshi	12	0	12	0	0	0	0	0	0	0
18	MF	(Iran)	Ali Fathi	17	2	11	2	1	0	4	0	1	0
20	MF	(Iran)	Ali Najafi	1	0	1	0	0	0	0	0	0	0
21	FW	(Iran)	Ashkan Dejagah	20	3	16	2	0	0	4	1	0	0
23	FW	(Iran)	Mohammad Abbaszadeh	35	16	28	12	1	0	5	4	1	0
24	FW	(Iran)	Mohammad Mehdi Ghanbari	12	1	12	1	0	0	0	0	0	0
28	MF	(Iran)	Ehsan Hajsafi	16	1	16	1	0	0	0	0	0	0
30	MF	(Iran)	Saeed Vasei	11	1	7	1	0	0	4	0	0	0

Last updated: 14 September 2021
Source: Competitions

== See also ==
- 2020–21 Persian Gulf Pro League
- 2020–21 Hazfi Cup
- 2021 AFC Champions League
