= List of Iranian football transfers winter 2021–22 =

The 2021–22 winter transfer window for Iranian football transfers opened on 16 January and closed at midnight on 12 February. Additionally, players without a club could join at any time. This list includes transfers featuring at least one Iran Football League club which were completed after the end of the summer 2021 transfer window on 7 November 2021 and before the end of the 2021–22 winter window.

== Persian Gulf Pro League ==
=== Aluminium ===
In:

No.	Pos.	Nation	Player

Out:

No.	Pos.	Nation	Player

=== Esteghlal ===
In:

No.	Pos.	Nation	Player
59	DF	(Iran) IRN	Abolfazl Jalali (from Saipa)
—	DF	(Iran) IRN	Saleh Hardani (from Foolad)
—	MF	(Uzbekistan) UZB	Azizbek Amonov (from (Uzbekistan) Lokomotiv)

Out:

No.	Pos.	Nation	Player
22	MF	(Iran) IRN	Babak Moradi (to Havadar)
42	MF	(Iran) IRN	Fardin Rabet (On loan to Padideh)
7	MF	(Iran) IRN	Arash Rezavand (On loan to Foolad)
33	DF	(Iran) IRN	Aref Aghasi (to Foolad)
27	DF	(Iran) IRN	Matin Karimzadeh (On loan to Nassaji)
12	GK	(Iran) IRN	Rashid Mazaheri (to Sepahan)
16	FW	(Iran) IRN	Mohammad Reza Azadi (to)

=== Fajr Sepasi ===
In:

No.	Pos.	Nation	Player

Out:

No.	Pos.	Nation	Player

=== Foolad ===
In:

No.	Pos.	Nation	Player
—	MF	(Iran) IRN	Alireza Koushki (from Paykan)

Out:

No.	Pos.	Nation	Player

=== Gol Gohar ===
In:

No.	Pos.	Nation	Player

Out:

No.	Pos.	Nation	Player

=== Havadar ===
In:

No.	Pos.	Nation	Player
—	MF	(Iran) IRN	Babak Moradi (from Esteghlal)

Out:

No.	Pos.	Nation	Player

=== Mes Rafsanjan ===
In:

No.	Pos.	Nation	Player
—	MF	(Iran) IRN	Hossein Pour Amini (from Paykan)

Out:

No.	Pos.	Nation	Player

=== Naft Masjed-Soleyman ===
In:

No.	Pos.	Nation	Player

Out:

No.	Pos.	Nation	Player
—	DF	(Iran) IRN	Payam Malekian (to Padideh)

=== Nassaji ===
In:

No.	Pos.	Nation	Player

Out:

No.	Pos.	Nation	Player

=== Padideh ===
In:

No.	Pos.	Nation	Player
—	DF	(Iran) IRN	Payam Malekian (from Naft Masjed-Soleyman)
—	MF	(Iran) IRN	Fardin Rabet (On loan from Esteghlal)

Out:

No.	Pos.	Nation	Player

=== Paykan ===
In:

No.	Pos.	Nation	Player

Out:

No.	Pos.	Nation	Player
—	MF	(Iran) IRN	Alireza Koushki (to Foolad)
—	MF	(Iran) IRN	Hossein Pour Amini (to Mes Rafsanjan)

=== Persepolis ===
In:

No.	Pos.	Nation	Player

Out:

No.	Pos.	Nation	Player

=== Sanat Naft ===
In:

No.	Pos.	Nation	Player

Out:

No.	Pos.	Nation	Player

=== Sepahan ===
In:

No.	Pos.	Nation	Player

Out:

No.	Pos.	Nation	Player

=== Tractor ===
In:

No.	Pos.	Nation	Player

Out:

No.	Pos.	Nation	Player

=== Zob Ahan ===
In:

No.	Pos.	Nation	Player

Out:

No.	Pos.	Nation	Player
