= List of Iranian football transfers winter 2019–20 =

This is a list of Iranian football transfers for the 2019–20 winter transfer window. Only transfers involving a team from the professional divisions are listed, including the 16 teams in the 2019–20 Persian Gulf Pro League and the 18 teams playing in the 2019–20 Azadegan League.

The winter transfer window opens on 17 December 2019, although a few transfers may take place prior to that date. The window closes at midnight on 13 January 2020 although outgoing transfers might still happen to leagues in which the window is still open. Players without a club may join teams, either during or in between transfer windows.

== Iran Pro League ==
=== Esteghlal ===
In:

No.	Pos.	Nation	Player
30	DF	(Iran) IRN	Azim Gök (Loan return from Malavan)
72	FW	(Iran) IRN	Amir Arsalan Motahari (from Zob Ahan)
20	DF	(Bulgaria) BUL	Nikolay Bodurov (from Free agent)

Out:

No.	Pos.	Nation	Player
44	DF	(Iran) IRN	Milad Bagheri (to Pars Jonoubi)
98	FW	(Iran) IRN	Morteza Aghakhan (to Saipa)
99	FW	(Iran) IRN	Sajjad Aghaei (On loan to Zob Ahan)

=== Foolad ===
In:

No.	Pos.	Nation	Player
12	MF	(South Africa) RSA	Ayanda Patosi (On loan from (South Africa) Cape Town City)
—	MF	(Iran) IRN	Zobeir Niknafs (from Zob Ahan)
—	MF	(Iran) IRN	Sina Zamehran (from Shahr Khodro)
77	MF	(Iran) IRN	Farshad Ahmadzadeh (from Persepolis)

Out:

No.	Pos.	Nation	Player
—	MF	(Iran) IRN	Meysam Doraghi (to Shahin Bushehr)
—	MF	(Iran) IRN	Rouhollah Seifollahi (to Shahr Khodro)
—	DF	(Jordan) JOR	Anas Bani Yaseen (to (Qatar) Al-Markhiya)

=== Gol Gohar ===
In:

No.	Pos.	Nation	Player
2	DF	(Iran) IRN	Ahmad Mousavi (from Tractor)
20	FW	(Nigeria) NGA	Godwin Mensha (from (United Arab Emirates) Ajman)

Out:

No.	Pos.	Nation	Player
—	FW	(Brazil) BRA	Jefferson Tavares da Silva (to (Bolivia) Palmaflor)
—	MF	(Netherlands) NED	Kevin Jansen (to (Netherlands) Quick Boys)
—	MF	(Montenegro) MNE	Uroš Delić (to Free agent)

=== Machine Sazi ===
In:

No.	Pos.	Nation	Player

Out:

No.	Pos.	Nation	Player
—	FW	(Brazil) BRA	Jefferson Reis de Jesus (to Free agent)

=== Naft Masjed-Soleyman ===
In:

No.	Pos.	Nation	Player

Out:

No.	Pos.	Nation	Player
—	DF	(Iran) IRN	Mohammad Tayyebi (to Sepahan)

=== Nassaji ===
In:

No.	Pos.	Nation	Player
70	MF	(Iran) IRN	Hamed Bahiraei (On loan from Sepahan)
15	DF	(Iran) IRN	Mehdi Rahimi (On loan from Sepahan)

Out:

No.	Pos.	Nation	Player

=== Pars Jonoubi Jam ===
In:

No.	Pos.	Nation	Player
—	DF	(Iran) IRN	Milad Bagheri (from Esteghlal)

Out:

No.	Pos.	Nation	Player
—	DF	(Iran) IRN	Mehdi Torkaman (to Sepahan)

=== Paykan ===
In:

No.	Pos.	Nation	Player
—	GK	(Armenia) ARM	Aram Hayrapetyan (from (Armenia) Urartu)

Out:

No.	Pos.	Nation	Player

=== Persepolis ===
In:

No.	Pos.	Nation	Player

Out:

No.	Pos.	Nation	Player
—	MF	(Iran) IRN	Farshad Ahmadzadeh (to Foolad)

=== Saipa ===
In:

No.	Pos.	Nation	Player
—	FW	(Iran) IRN	Morteza Aghakhan (On loan from Esteghlal)

Out:

No.	Pos.	Nation	Player

=== Sanat Naft ===
In:

No.	Pos.	Nation	Player

Out:

No.	Pos.	Nation	Player

=== Shahin Bushehr ===
In:

No.	Pos.	Nation	Player
2	DF	(Iran) IRN	Abolfazl Razzaghpour (On loan from Tractor)
—	MF	(Iran) IRN	Meysam Doraghi (from Foolad)

Out:

No.	Pos.	Nation	Player

=== Shahr Khodro ===
In:

No.	Pos.	Nation	Player
80	MF	(Iran) IRN	Rouhollah Seifollahi (from Foolad)
99	FW	(Iran) IRN	Mohammad Reza Khalatbari (from Zob Ahan)
67	FW	(Ukraine) UKR	Miro Slavov (from (Latvia) Riga)

Out:

No.	Pos.	Nation	Player
—	MF	(Iran) IRN	Soroush Rafiei (to Sepahan)
—	MF	(Iran) IRN	Sina Zamehran (to Foolad)
—	DF	(Iran) IRN	Farshad Mohammadi Mehr (from Zob Ahan)
—	FW	(Nicaragua) NCA	Carlos Chavarría (to (Tunisia) Africain)

=== Sepahan ===
In:

No.	Pos.	Nation	Player
16	FW	(Oman) OMA	Muhsen Al-Ghassani (from (Oman) Suwaiq Club)
67	DF	(Iran) IRN	Mehdi Torkaman (from Pars Jonoubi Jam)
22	DF	(Iran) IRN	Mohammad Tayyebi (from Naft Masjed-Soleyman)
73	MF	(Iran) IRN	Soroush Rafiei (from Shahr Khodro)

Out:

No.	Pos.	Nation	Player
70	MF	(Iran) IRN	Hamed Bahiraei (On loan to Nassaji)
78	DF	(Iran) IRN	Mehdi Rahimi (On loan to Nassaji)
35	FW	(Iran) IRN	Abolfazl Akasheh (On loan to Aluminium Arak)

=== Tractor ===
In:

No.	Pos.	Nation	Player
20	FW	(Algeria) ALG	Okacha Hamzaoui (from (Algeria) USM Bel Abbès)
69	DF	(Iran) IRN	Milad Fakhreddini (from Zob Ahan)
15	DF	(Brazil) BRA	Yuri Matias (from (Portugal) Académica)

Out:

No.	Pos.	Nation	Player
30	DF	(Iran) IRN	Abolfazl Razzaghpour (On loan to Shahin Bushehr)
2	DF	(Iran) IRN	Ahmad Mousavi (to Gol Gohar)
13	FW	(France) FRA	Kévin Fortuné (to Free agent)
11	FW	(Brazil) BRA	Mazola (to (Brazil) CA Juventus)
24	FW	(Japan) JPN	Yukiya Sugita (to Free agent)

=== Zob Ahan ===
In:

No.	Pos.	Nation	Player
22	GK	(Lebanon) LBN	Mehdi Khalil (On loan from (Algeria) Al Ahed)
17	DF	(Iran) IRN	Farshad Mohammadi Mehr (from Shahr Khodro)
—	DF	(Iran) IRN	Vafa Hakhamaneshi (from (Iraq) Al-Minaa)
—	FW	(Iran) IRN	Sajjad Aghaei (On loan from Esteghlal)
18	FW	(Serbia) SRB	Darko Bjedov (from (Serbia) Rad)

Out:

No.	Pos.	Nation	Player
—	DF	(Iran) IRN	Milad Fakhreddini (to Tractor)
—	FW	(Iran) IRN	Amir Arsalan Motahari (to Esteghlal)
—	MF	(Iran) IRN	Zobeir Niknafs (to Foolad)
—	FW	(Iran) IRN	Mohammad Reza Khalatbari (to Shahr Khodro)
—	DF	(Nigeria) NGA	Ebiabowei Baker (to Free agent)
—	FW	(Nigeria) NGA	Macauley Chrisantus (to (Saudi Arabia) Hetten)
