= List of Iranian football transfers summer 2021 =

This is a list of Iranian football transfers for the 2021 summer transfer window. Only moves from Persian Gulf Pro League are listed. The summer transfer window will begin on 16 August 2021 and closes at midnight on 7 November 2021. Players without a club may join at any time. This list includes transfers featuring at least one Iran Football League club which were completed after the end of the winter 2020–21 transfer window on 16 March and before the end of the 2021 summer window.

== Rules and regulations ==
According to Iran Football Federation rules for 2021–22 Persian Gulf Pro League, each Football Club is allowed to take up to maximum 7 new Iranian player from the other clubs who already played in the 2020–21 Persian Gulf Pro League season. In addition to these seven new players, each club is allowed to take up to 3 players from Free agent (who did not play in 2021–22 Persian Gulf Pro League season or doesn't list in any 2021–22 League after season's start) during the season. Under-25 years old players must be under contract of the club in the previous season. Under-21 and under-19 years old players can also be signed during the season.

=== Players limits ===
The Iranian Football Clubs who participate in 21–22 Iranian football different levels are allowed to have up to maximum 63 players in their player lists, which will be categorized in the following groups:

- Up to maximum 20 adult (without any age limit) players
- Up to maximum 4 under-25 players (i.e. the player whose birth is after 1 January 1997).
- Up to maximum 9 under-23 players (i.e. the player whose birth is after 1 January 1999).
- Up to maximum 15 under-21 players (i.e. the player whose birth is after 1 January 2001).
- Up to maximum 15 under-19 players (i.e. the player whose birth is after 1 January 2003).

== Persian Gulf Pro League ==
=== Aluminium ===
In:

No.	Pos.	Nation	Player
—	FW	(Iran) IRN	Alireza Sadeghi ^{U23} (On loan from Sepahan)

Out:

No.	Pos.	Nation	Player
6	MF	(Iran) IRN	Mehdi Hosseini (to Mes Rafsanjan)

=== Esteghlal ===
In:

No.	Pos.	Nation	Player
80	FW	(Iran) IRN	Mohammad Bolboli (Loan return from Naft MIS)
40	MF	(Iran) IRN	Amir Hossein Khodamoradi (Loan return from Sanat Naft)
44	DF	(Iran) IRN	Mohammadjavad Behafarin (Loan return from Chooka Talesh)
71	FW	(Iran) IRN	Mohammad Hossein Fallah (Loan return from Machine Sazi)
77	MF	(Iran) IRN	Reza Azari (Loan return from Machine Sazi)
42	MF	(Iran) IRN	Fardin Rabet (Loan return from Naft MIS)

Out:

No.	Pos.	Nation	Player
19	GK	(Iran) IRN	Hossein Pour Hamidi (to Tractor)
2	DF	(Iran) IRN	Mohammad Naderi (to (Turkey) Altay)
7	DF	(Mali) MLI	Cheick Diabaté (Unattached)
33	DF	(Croatia) CRO	Hrvoje Milić (Unattached)
6	MF	(Iran) IRN	Masoud Rigi (to Sepahan)

=== Fajr Sepasi ===
In:

No.	Pos.	Nation	Player

Out:

No.	Pos.	Nation	Player
—	MF	(Iran) IRN	Aria Barzegar (Loan return to Persepolis)

=== Foolad ===
In:

No.	Pos.	Nation	Player

Out:

No.	Pos.	Nation	Player
68	GK	(Iran) IRN	Mohsen Forouzan (to Gol Gohar)
10	MF	(Iran) IRN	Farshad Ahmadzadeh (to Sepahan)

=== Gol Gohar ===
In:

No.	Pos.	Nation	Player
—	DF	(Iran) IRN	Iman Salimi (from (Slovakia) Sereď)
—	DF	(Iran) IRN	Mehdi Tikdari (from Tractor)
—	GK	(Iran) IRN	Mohsen Forouzan (from Foolad)
—	FW	(Iran) IRN	Hossein Nokhodkar^{U21} (from Saipa)
—	DF	(Iran) IRN	Shayan Mosleh (from Sepahan)

Out:

No.	Pos.	Nation	Player
5	DF	(Iran) IRN	Alireza Ebrahimi (to Persepolis)
1	GK	(Iran) IRN	Alireza Haghighi (Unattached)

=== Havadar ===
In:

No.	Pos.	Nation	Player

Out:

No.	Pos.	Nation	Player

=== Mes Rafsanjan ===
In:

No.	Pos.	Nation	Player
—	MF	(Iran) IRN	Mehdi Hosseini (from Aluminium)
—	DF	(Iran) IRN	Mehdi Torkaman (from Sepahan)

Out:

No.	Pos.	Nation	Player
16	MF	(Iran) IRN	Alireza Naghizadeh (to Tractor)

=== Naft Masjed-Soleyman ===
In:

No.	Pos.	Nation	Player

Out:

No.	Pos.	Nation	Player

=== Nassaji ===
In:

No.	Pos.	Nation	Player
—	DF	(Iran) IRN	Morteza Mansouri (from Sepahan)

Out:

No.	Pos.	Nation	Player
44	GK	(Iran) IRN	Nima Mirzazad (to Sepahan)

=== Padideh ===
In:

No.	Pos.	Nation	Player

Out:

No.	Pos.	Nation	Player

=== Paykan ===
In:

No.	Pos.	Nation	Player

Out:

No.	Pos.	Nation	Player
17	FW	(Iran) IRN	Amir Roustaei (Loan return to Persepolis)

=== Persepolis ===
In:

No.	Pos.	Nation	Player
20	FW	(Iran) IRN	Amir Roustaei (Loan return from Paykan)
26	MF	(Iran) IRN	Saeid Hosseinpour (Loan return from Machine Sazi)
25	MF	(Iran) IRN	Aria Barzegar (Loan return from Fajr Sepasi)
5	DF	(Iran) IRN	Alireza Ebrahimi (from Gol Gohar Sirjan)

Out:

No.	Pos.	Nation	Player
6	DF	(Iran) IRN	Hossein Kanaanizadegan (to (Qatar) Al Ahli)
70	FW	(Iran) IRN	Shahriyar Moghanlou (Loan return to (Portugal) Santa Clara)

=== Sanat Naft ===
In:

No.	Pos.	Nation	Player

Out:

No.	Pos.	Nation	Player

=== Sepahan ===
In:

No.	Pos.	Nation	Player
1	GK	(Austria) AUT	Christopher Knett (from (Greece) Panetolikos)
6	MF	(Iran) IRN	Masoud Rigi (from Esteghlal)
8	MF	(Iran) IRN	Farshad Ahmadzadeh (from Foolad khuzestan)
14	MF	(Iran) IRN	Aria Yousefi ^{U21} (from Sepahan U19)
16	DF	(Iran) IRN	Davoud Rajabi ^{U25} (Loan return from Baadraan)
23	MF	(Iran) IRN	Amir Mohammad Mohkamkar ^{U21} (from Sepahan U19)
25	DF	(Iran) IRN	Amir Saman Ranjbar ^{U23} (from Sepahan Novin)
27	MF	(Iran) IRN	Hassan Shoushtari (from Arman Gohar Sirjan)
44	GK	(Iran) IRN	Nima Mirzazad (from Nassaji)
70	FW	(Iran) IRN	Shahriyar Moghanlou (from (Portugal) Santa Clara)

Out:

No.	Pos.	Nation	Player
1	GK	(Iran) IRN	Payam Niazmand (to (Portugal) Portimonense)
10	MF	(Iran) IRN	Mohammad Mohebi (to (Portugal) Santa Clara)
15	MF	(Iran) IRN	Mohammad Papi ^{U25} (Loan return from Baadraan/ On loan to Naft Masjed Soleyman)
18	FW	(Iran) IRN	Alireza Sadeghi ^{U23} (On loan to Aluminium Arak)
28	MF	(Iran) IRN	Ehsan Hajsafi (to (Greece) AEK Athens)
37	DF	(Iran) IRN	Morteza Mansouri (to Nassaji)
67	DF	(Iran) IRN	Mehdi Torkaman (to Mes Rafsanjan)
69	DF	(Iran) IRN	Shayan Mosleh (to Gol Gohar Sirjan)
70	MF	(Iran) IRN	Hamed Bahiraei (to Machine Sazi)
8	MF	(Iran) IRN	Rasoul Navidkia (Unattached)
27	FW	(Iran) IRN	Rouhollah Bagheri (Unattached)
88	FW	(Brazil) BRA	Kiros Stanlley (Unattached)

=== Tractor ===
In:

No.	Pos.	Nation	Player
—	GK	(Iran) IRN	Hossein Pour Hamidi (from Esteghlal)
16	MF	(Iran) IRN	Alireza Naghizadeh (from Mes Rafsanjan)

Out:

No.	Pos.	Nation	Player
7	MF	(Iran) IRN	Masoud Shojaei (Unattached)
21	MF	(Iran) IRN	Ashkan Dejagah (Unattached)
11	DF	(Iran) IRN	Mehdi Tikdari (to Gol Gohar)

=== Zob Ahan ===
In:

No.	Pos.	Nation	Player

Out:

No.	Pos.	Nation	Player
