= Gholampour =

Gholampour (Persian: غلامپور) is a surname. Notable people with the surname include:

- Ali Gholampour, accomplice of Iranian serial killer Mohammed Bijeh
- Aref Gholampour (born 1999), Iranian football midfielder
- Behzad Gholampour (born 1966), Iranian football and futsal goalkeeper
- Sina Gholampour (born 1999), Iranian swimmer
