= List of Iranian football transfers winter 2020–21 =

This is a list of Iranian football transfers for the 2020–21 winter transfer window. Only moves from Persian Gulf Pro League are listed. Players without a club may join at any time. This list includes transfers featuring at least one Iran Football League club which were completed after the end of the summer 2020 transfer window on 19 November 2020 and before the end of the 2020–21 winter window.

== Rules and regulations ==
According to Iran Football Federation rules for 2020–21 Persian Gulf Pro League, each Football Club is allowed to take up to maximum 7 new Iranian player from the other clubs who already played in the 2020–21 Persian Gulf Pro League season.

== Persian Gulf Pro League ==
=== Aluminium ===
In:

No.	Pos.	Nation	Player

Out:

No.	Pos.	Nation	Player

=== Esteghlal ===
In:

No.	Pos.	Nation	Player

Out:

No.	Pos.	Nation	Player
11	FW	(Iran) IRN	Morteza Tabrizi (to Gol Gohar)

=== Foolad ===
In:

No.	Pos.	Nation	Player

Out:

No.	Pos.	Nation	Player

=== Gol Gohar ===
In:

No.	Pos.	Nation	Player
—	FW	(Iran) IRN	Morteza Tabrizi (from Esteghlal)

Out:

No.	Pos.	Nation	Player

=== Machine Sazi ===
In:

No.	Pos.	Nation	Player

Out:

No.	Pos.	Nation	Player

=== Mes Rafsanjan ===
In:

No.	Pos.	Nation	Player
60	MF	(Iran) IRN	Mehdi Kiani (from Sepahan)

Out:

No.	Pos.	Nation	Player

=== Naft Masjed-Soleyman ===
In:

No.	Pos.	Nation	Player

Out:

No.	Pos.	Nation	Player

=== Nassaji ===
In:

No.	Pos.	Nation	Player
—	MF	(Iran) IRN	Reza Dehghani ^{U23} (on loan from Sepahan)

Out:

No.	Pos.	Nation	Player

=== Paykan ===
In:

No.	Pos.	Nation	Player
—	MF	(Iran) IRN	Mohammad Papi ^{U23} (on loan from Sepahan)

Out:

No.	Pos.	Nation	Player
20	DF	(Iran) IRN	Hojjat Haghverdi (Unattached)
1	GK	(Iran) IRN	Vahid Sheikhveisi (Unattached)
10	FW	(Iran) IRN	Mehdi Sharifi (Unattached)

=== Persepolis ===
In:

No.	Pos.	Nation	Player
99	MF	(Iran) IRN	Mehdi Torabi (from (Qatar) Al-Arabi)

Out:

No.	Pos.	Nation	Player
5	MF	(Iraq) IRQ	Bashar Resan (to Qatar SC)

=== Saipa ===
In:

No.	Pos.	Nation	Player

Out:

No.	Pos.	Nation	Player

=== Sanat Naft ===
In:

No.	Pos.	Nation	Player

Out:

No.	Pos.	Nation	Player

=== Shahr Khodro ===
In:

No.	Pos.	Nation	Player

Out:

No.	Pos.	Nation	Player

=== Sepahan ===
In:

No.	Pos.	Nation	Player
44	GK	(Iran) IRN	Hojjat Sedghi (from Gol Reyhan Alborz)
28	MF	(Iran) IRN	Ehsan Hajsafi (from Tractor)

Out:

No.	Pos.	Nation	Player
16	FW	(Oman) OMA	Muhsen Al-Ghassani (to (Oman) Al-Seeb)
12	MF	(Iran) IRN	Reza Dehghani ^{U23} (on loan to Nassaji)
15	MF	(Iran) IRN	Mohammad Papi ^{U23} (on loan to Paykan)
23	DF	(Iran) IRN	Sobhan Pasandideh ^{U23} (on loan to Malavan)
6	MF	(Iran) IRN	Mehdi Kiani (to Mes Rafsanjan)

=== Tractor ===
In:

No.	Pos.	Nation	Player

Out:

No.	Pos.	Nation	Player
28	MF	(Iran) IRN	Ehsan Hajsafi (to Sepahan)

=== Zob Ahan ===
In:

No.	Pos.	Nation	Player

Out:

No.	Pos.	Nation	Player
