= Šime Gregov =

Croatian footballer (born 1989)

Personal information
- Full name: Šime Gregov
- Date of birth: 8 July 1989 (age 37)
- Place of birth: Zadar, Croatia
- Height: 1.89 m (6 ft 2 1/2 in)
- Position: Centre back

Team information
- Current team: Varesina

Senior career*
Years	Team	Apps	(Gls)
2007–2011	Zadar	24	(0)
2010–2011	→ Raštane (loan)		
2011	Velebit		
2011–2014	Hrvatski Dragovoljac	55	(1)
2014–2016	Istra 1961	33	(1)
2016	Krško	13	(1)
2016–2017	Koper	24	(0)
2017	Viking	10	(0)
2018	Tractor	0	(0)
2018	Krško	0	(0)
2018–2019	Kurilovec		
2019	Hrvatski Dragovoljac	11	(1)
2019–2020	Seregno	18	(1)
2021	Ghivizzano Borgo a Mozzano	11	(1)
2021–	Varesina		
- * Club domestic league appearances and goals as of 09:02, 9 June 2021 (UTC)

Šime Gregov (born 8 July 1989) is a Croatian footballer who currently plays for Italian club Varesina Calcio.

== Club career ==
Gregov started his professional career with local Zadar in 2007.

He later transferred to Hrvatski Dragovoljac, where he would stay for three years. In the 2012-13 season Gregov and Hrvatski Dragovoljac finished first and were promoted to the 1. HNL. The following season they got relegated, and Gregov left the club to join Istra 1961.

After spending the last two seasons with PrvaLiga sides Krško and Koper, Gregov signed for Norwegian club Viking 4 July 2017.

On 30 January 2018, Gregov joined Tractor. On 20 July 2018, Gregov returned to NK Krško. But only 1,5-months later, he joined NK Kurilovec on 18 September. He left the club at the end of 2018 and joined Hrvatski Dragovoljac.

In the summer 2019, Gregov moved abroad and joined Italian Serie D club U.S.D. 1913 Seregno Calcio.

== Career statistics ==
As of 9 June 2021

Club	Season	Division	League		Cup		Continental		Total	
Club	Season	Division	Apps	Goals	Apps	Goals	Apps	Goals	Apps	Goals
Zadar	2007–08	1. HNL	11	0	0	0	—		11	0
Zadar	2008–09	1. HNL	8	0	0	0	—		8	0
Zadar	2010–11	1. HNL	5	0	0	0	—		5	0
Zadar	Total		24	0	0	0	—		24	0
Hrvatski Dragovoljac	2012–13	2. HNL	28	1	0	0	—		28	1
Hrvatski Dragovoljac	2013–14	1. HNL	27	0	0	0	—		27	0
Hrvatski Dragovoljac	Total		55	1	0	0	—		55	1
Istra 1961	2014–15	1. HNL	29	1	4	0	—		33	1
Istra 1961	2015–16	1. HNL	4	0	1	0	—		5	0
Istra 1961	Total		33	1	5	0	—		38	1
Krško	2015–16	1. SNL	13	1	0	0	—		13	1
Koper	2016–17	1. SNL	24	0	1	0	—		25	0
Viking	2017	Eliteserien	10	0	0	0	—		10	0
Tractor	2017–18	Persian Gulf Pro League	0	0	0	0	1	0	1	0
Hrvatski Dragovoljac	2018–19	2. HNL	11	1	0	0	—		11	1
Seregno	2019–20	Serie D	18	1	0	0	—		18	1
Ghivizzano Borgo a Mozzano	2020–21	Serie D	11	1	0	0	—		11	1
Career total			199	6	6	0	1	0	206	6
