= Payam Malekian =

Iranian footballer

Personal information
- Full name: Payam Malekian
- Date of birth: January 13, 1996 (age 30)
- Place of birth: Iran
- Position: Defender

Team information
- Current team: Naft Masjed Soleyman
- Number: 77

Youth career
- –2016: Siah Jamegan

Senior career*
Years	Team	Apps	(Gls)
2016–2018	Siah Jamegan	47	(7)
2018–	Naft Masjed Soleyman	10	(1)
- * Club domestic league appearances and goals as of 26 August 2017

Payam Malekian is an Iranian football defender who currently plays for Iranian football club Naft Masjed Soleyman in the Persian Gulf Pro League.
