= Sina Zamehran =

Iranian footballer

Personal information
- Date of birth: 10 March 1997 (age 29)
- Place of birth: Mashhad, Iran
- Height: 1.86 m (6 ft 1 in)
- Position: Midfielder

Youth career
- –2016: Padideh

Senior career*
Years	Team	Apps	(Gls)
2016–2020	Shahr Khodro	19	(0)
2020–2021	Foolad	4	(0)
2021	Sanat Naft	3	(0)
2022–2023	Saipa		
2023	Naft Gachsaran		
2023–2024	Darya Caspian	8	(0)
2025-2026	Saham Club		

International career^{‡}
2019	Iran U23	9	(0)
- * Club domestic league appearances and goals as of 10 June 2024 ‡ National team caps and goals as of 28 December 2019

Sina Zamehran (Persian: سينا زامهران; born 10 March 1997) is an Iranian footballer who plays as a midfielder.
