= Amin Asadi =

Iranian football player

Personal information
- Full name: Amin Asadi
- Date of birth: 14 September 1993 (age 33)
- Place of birth: Tehran, Iran
- Height: 1.82 m (6 ft 0 in)
- Position: Forward

Youth career
- Apadana

Senior career*
Years	Team	Apps	(Gls)
2018–2020	Arman Gohar	33	(23)
2020_2021	Tractor	11	(7)
- * Club domestic league appearances and goals

Amin Asadi (Persian: امین اسدی, born September 14, 1993, in Tehran, Iran) is an Iranian professional footballer who plays as a right back for Saipa in the Persian Gulf Pro League.

== Club career ==
He started his career with Apadana Tehran youth levels. Later he joined Shahin Tehran and Ehsan Rey youth academies.

=== Arman Gohar ===
He joined F.C. Arman Gohar in summer 2018. He made his debut for Arman Gohar on September 15, 2018.

=== Tractor ===
He joined Tractor in summer 2020. He made his debut for Tractor on September 20, 2020.
