= Mahdi Mohammadian =

Iranian footballer

Personal information
- Full name: Mahdi Mohammadian
- Date of birth: March 5, 1997 (age 29)
- Place of birth: Tabriz, Iran
- Height: 1.88 m (6 ft 2 in)
- Position: Goalkeeper

Youth career
- 2013–2016: Tractor

Senior career*
Years	Team	Apps	(Gls)
2016–2019	Tractor	0	(0)
- * Club domestic league appearances and goals as of 26 June 2018 ‡ National team caps and goals as of 8 June 2017

Mahdi Mohammadian (born March 5, 1997) is an Iranian goalkeeper who last played for Iranian club Tractor in the Iran Pro League.
