= Hamed Hosseinalizadeh =

Iranian footballer

Personal information
- Full name: Hamed Hosseinalizadeh
- Date of birth: January 9, 1998 (age 28)
- Place of birth: Khalkhal, Iran
- Height: 1.74 m (5 ft 9 in)
- Position: Left winger

Team information
- Current team: Pars Jonoubi

Youth career
- 2014–2016: Tractor

Senior career*
Years	Team	Apps	(Gls)
2015–	Tractor B	24	(7)
2016–2020	Tractor	7	(0)
2020–	Nassaji	0	(0)
2020–2021	Pars Jonoubi	0	(0)
2022	Shahrdari Hamedan F.C.		

International career^{‡}
2016–	Iran U20	3	(0)
- * Club domestic league appearances and goals as of 9 November 2018 ‡ National team caps and goals as of 4 August 2018

Hamed Hosseinalizadeh (born January 9, 1998) is an Iranian football forward who currently plays for Iranian club Pars Jonoubi in the Iran Pro League.
