= Rahman Jafari =

Iranian footballer

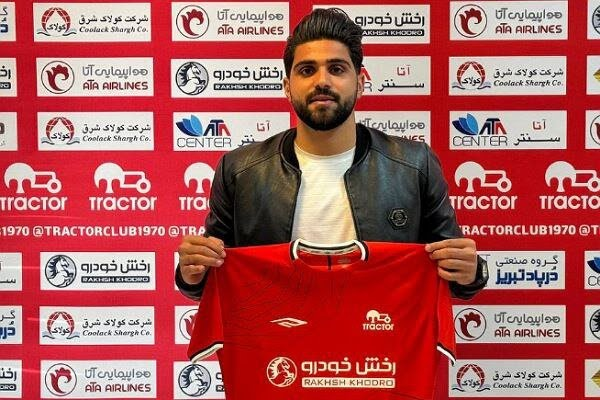

Personal information
- Date of birth: 6 March 1997 (age 29)
- Place of birth: Babol, Iran
- Height: 1.82 m (5 ft 11 1/2 in)
- Position: Striker

Team information
- Current team: Zob Ahan
- Number: 11

Youth career
- –2016: Nassaji Mazandaran

Senior career*
Years	Team	Apps	(Gls)
2016–2020	Nassaji Mazandaran	68	(9)
2020–2022	Shahr Khodro	41	(2)
2022–2024	Shams Azar	45	(29)
2024	Tractor	18	(5)
2024–2026	Aluminium Arak	43	(8)
2026–	Zob Ahan	14	(1)
- * Club domestic league appearances and goals as of 2 May 2025

Rahman Jafari (Persian: رحمان جعفری; born 6 March 1997) is an Iranian football forward who plays for Zob Ahan in Persian Gulf Pro League.

== Career statistics ==
=== Club ===
Club	Season	League			Cup		Continental		Other	
Club	Season	League	Apps	Goals	Apps	Goals	Apps	Goals	Apps	Goals
Nassaji	2014-15	Azadegan League	1	0	0	0	0	0	1	0
Nassaji	2015-16	Azadegan League	5	1	0	0	0	0	5	1
Nassaji	2016-17	Azadegan League	4	0	0	0	0	0	4	0
Nassaji	2017-18	Azadegan League	13	2	2	0	0	0	15	2
Nassaji	2018-19	Persian Gulf Pro League	17	3	2	0	0	0	19	3
Nassaji	2019-20	Persian Gulf Pro League	25	3	1	0	0	0	26	3
Nassaji	Total		65	9	5	0	0	0	70	9
Shahr Khodro	2020-21	Persian Gulf Pro League	18	1	0	0	0	0	18	1
Shahr Khodro	2021-22	Persian Gulf Pro League	23	1	2	0	0	0	25	1
Shahr Khodro	Total		41	2	2	0	0	0	43	2
Shams Azar	2022-23	Azadegan League	30	24	1	0	0	0	31	24
Shams Azar	2023-24	Persian Gulf Pro League	14	5	0	0	0	0	14	5
Shams Azar	Total		44	29	1	0	0	0	45	29
Tractor	2023-24	Persian Gulf Pro League	5	4	0	0	0	0	5	4
Career Total			155	44	8	0	0	0	163	44
