= Fakher Tahami =

Iranian footballer

Personal information
- Full name: Seyed Fakher Tahami
- Date of birth: 19 April 1996 (age 30)
- Place of birth: Abadan, Iran
- Height: 1.76 m (5 ft 9 1/2 in)
- Position: Forward

Team information
- Current team: Paykan
- Number: 30

Youth career
- 2004–2014: Sanat Naft

Senior career*
Years	Team	Apps	(Gls)
2013–2024	Sanat Naft	128	(5)
2016–2018	→ Tractor (loan)	14	(1)
2024–	Paykan	5	(0)
- * Club domestic league appearances and goals as of 16 April 2025

Seyed Fakher Tahami (Persian: سیدفاخر تهامی; born 19 April 1996) is an Iranian football forward who plays for Paykan in the Azadegan League.

== Career statistics ==
=== Club ===
Club	Season	League			Cup		Continental		Total	
Club	Season	League	Apps	Goals	Apps	Goals	Apps	Goals	Apps	Goals
Sanat	2014-15	Azadegan League	9	1	0	0	0	0	9	1
Sanat	2015-16	Azadegan League	12	2	0	0	0	0	12	2
Sanat	Total		21	3	0	0	0	0	21	3
Tractor	2016-17	Persian Gulf Pro League	3	0	0	0	0	0	3	0
Tractor	2017-18	Persian Gulf Pro League	11	1	2	0	1	0	14	1
Tractor	Total		14	1	2	0	1	0	17	1
Sanat	2018-19	Persian Gulf Pro League	11	1	0	0	0	0	11	1
Sanat	2019-20	Persian Gulf Pro League	9	0	0	0	0	0	9	0
Sanat	2020-21	Persian Gulf Pro League	17	1	0	0	0	0	17	1
Sanat	2021-22	Persian Gulf Pro League	25	0	0	0	0	0	25	0
Sanat	2022-23	Persian Gulf Pro League	20	0	1	0	0	0	21	0
Sanat	2023-24	Persian Gulf Pro League	19	0	0	0	0	0	19	0
Sanat	Total		101	2	1	0	0	0	102	2
Career Total			136	6	3	0	1	0	140	6

== Honours ==
Tractor

- Shohada Cup (1): 2017
