= Saeed Vasei =

Iranian footballer

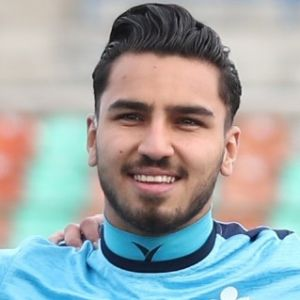

Personal information
- Date of birth: 19 December 1994 (age 31)
- Place of birth: Mashhad, Iran
- Height: 1.83 m (6 ft 0 in)
- Position: Attacking midfielder

Team information
- Current team: Sepahan
- Number: 73

Youth career
- 2006–2010: Saipa Mashhad
- 2010–2013: Ghadir Khorasan
- 2013–2014: Siah Jamegan

Senior career*
Years	Team	Apps	(Gls)
2014–2016	Siah Jamegan	17	(1)
2016–2018	Baadraan	52	(9)
2018–2020	Paykan	47	(6)
2020–2023	Tractor	27	(1)
2023–2024	Foolad	22	(1)
2024–2025	Mes Rafsanjan	30	(3)
2026–	Sepahan	3	(0)
- * Club domestic league appearances and goals as of 1 May 2025

Saeed Vasei (Persian: سعید واسعی; born 19 December 1994) is an Iranian professional footballer who plays as a midfielder for Sepahan in the Persian Gulf Pro League.

== Club career ==
Vasei started his career with Saipa Mashhad Academy. He also had experiences in Ghadir Khorasan, Sanat Khorasan and Mes Kerman Academies. Vasei joined to Siah Jamegan in summer 2014 and was part of the club in promotion to Persian Gulf Pro League in 2015. He made his professional debut for Siah Jamegan on 7 August 2015 in 1–0 loss against Esteghlal Ahvaz as a substitute for Milan Jovanović.

On 12 October 2020, Vasei signed a contract with Persian Gulf Pro League club Tractor .

== International career ==
In 2019, Vasei was invited to the Iranian national team by Marc Wilmots and played a game against the Iran national under-23 football team, which was not an official FIFA-recognized game.

== Career statistics ==
As of 20 October 2015.

Club	Division	Season	League		Hazfi Cup		Asia		Total	
Club	Division	Season	Apps	Goals	Apps	Goals	Apps	Goals	Apps	Goals
Siah Jamegan	Division 1	2014–15	2	0	0	0	–	–	2	0
Siah Jamegan	Pro League	2015–16	14	1	0	0	–	–	14	1
Baadraan	Azadegan league	2016_ 2018	53	9					53	9
Peykan	Persian Gulf pro league	2018_ 20	47	6					47	6
Tractor	Persian Gulf pro league	2020_ 21	5	0					2	0
Career Totals			7	0	0	0	0	0	118	16
