= Mehdi Torkaman =

Iranian footballer (born 1989)

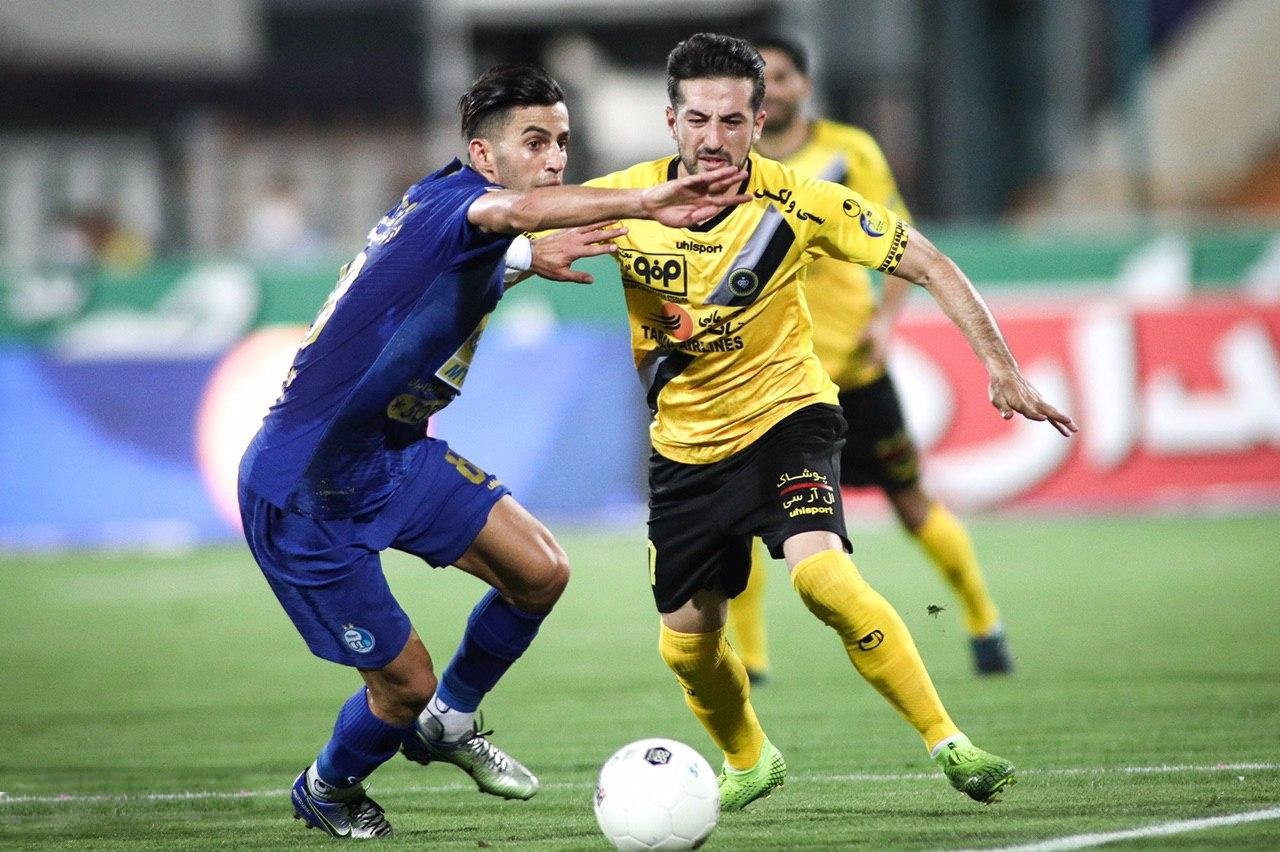
- Torkaman in 2020

Personal information
- Date of birth: March 8, 1989 (age 37)
- Place of birth: Karaj, Iran
- Height: 1.78 m (5 ft 10 in)
- Positions: Left-back; left winger

Team information
- Current team: Mes Rafsanjan
- Number: 77

Youth career
- –2011: Saipa

Senior career*
Years	Team	Apps	(Gls)
2011–2012	Saipa	1	(0)
2012–2013	Albadr	13	(4)
2013–2014	Shahrdari Ardabil	22	(5)
2014–2015	Shahrdari Zanjan	14	(4)
2015–2016	Shahrdari Ardabil	19	(1)
2016	Baadraan	10	(6)
2016–2017	Shahrdari Bandar Abbas	15	(7)
2017–2018	Baadraan	19	(2)
2018–2019	Aluminium Arak	21	(1)
2019	Pars Jonoubi	15	(0)
2020–2021	Sepahan	12	(1)
2021–	Mes Rafsanjan	28	(0)
- * Club domestic league appearances and goals as of 19 March 2021

Mehdi Torkaman (Persian: مهدی ترکمان; born March 8, 1989) is an Iranian footballer who plays as a left back for Mes Rafsanjan in the Persian Gulf Pro League.

== Career ==
=== Saipa ===
He made his debut for Saipa in last fixtures of 2011–12 Iran Pro League against Naft Abadan while he substituted in for Roozbeh Shahalidoost.

=== Pars Jam ===
Torkaman signed a two-year deal with Pars Jam on 16 June 2019 and returned to first tier of Iran football.

== Career statistics ==
Club performance			League		Cup		Continental		Total	
Season	Club	League	Apps	Goals	Apps	Goals	Apps	Goals	Apps	Goals
Iran			League		Hazfi Cup		Asia		Total	
2019–20	Sepahan	Iran Pro League	2	1	0	0	0	0	2	1
Career total			2	1	0	0	0	0	2	1
