= Fardin Rabet =

Association football player

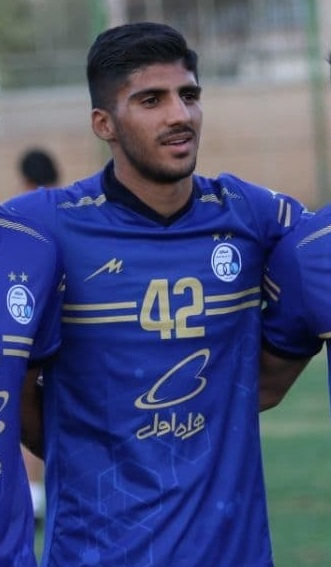
- Fardin, playing for Esteghlal, 2021

Personal information
- Full name: Fardin Rabet
- Date of birth: 29 October 2001 (age 25)
- Place of birth: Piranshahr, Iran
- Height: 1.80 m (5 ft 11 in)
- Position: Left winger

Team information
- Current team: TSV Neudrossenfeld
- Number: 42

Youth career
- 2017–2019: Tractor
- 2019–2021: Esteghlal

Senior career*
Years	Team	Apps	(Gls)
2019–2021	Esteghlal	5	(0)
2020–2021	→ Naft Masjed Soleyman (loan)	13	(1)
2021–2022	→ Shahr Khodro (loan)	13	(0)
2022–2024	Dalkurd	29	(2)
2024	Olimpia Grudziądz	15	(1)
2024–2025	TSV Neudrossenfeld	25	(7)
2025–	APEA Akrotiri	14	(0)
2026–2027	TSV Neudrossenfeld		

International career
2019–2020	Iran U20		
	Iran U23	2021-2022	
- * Club domestic league appearances and goals as of 3 May 2026

Fardin Rabet (Persian: فردین رابط; born 29 October 2001) is an Iranian professional footballer who plays as a winger for German club TSV Neudrossenfeld.

== Biography ==
Fardin Rabet was born in the city of Piranshahr and is Iranian-Kurdish.

== Club career ==
=== Esteghlal Tehran ===
He made his debut for Esteghlal in matchday 26 of 2019–20 Iran Pro League against Nassaji Mazandaran while he substituted in for Mehdi Ghayedi.

=== Europe ===
Rabet left Esteghlal for the Swedish club Dalkurd FF (a club founded by Swedish members of the Kurdish diaspora) in 2022. He played with Dalkurd from 2022 to 2024, then signed with Polish club Olimpia Grudziądz in 2024. Rabet moved from TSV Neudrossenfeld, where he played 2024–2025, to APEA Akrotiri, then back to Neudrossenfield in 2026.
