= Mohammad Reza Akhbari =

Iranian footballer (born 1993)

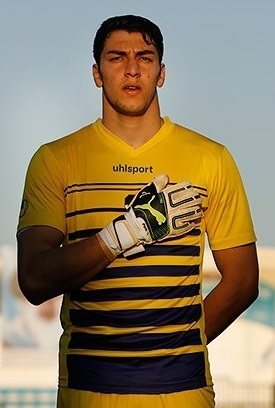
- Akhbari with Tractor in 2021

Personal information
- Full name: Mohammad Reza Akhbari Shad
- Date of birth: 15 February 1993 (age 33)
- Place of birth: Isfahan, Iran
- Height: 1.91 m (6 ft 3 in)
- Position: Goalkeeper

Team information
- Current team: Gol Gohar
- Number: 97

Youth career
- 2005–2014: Saipa

Senior career*
Years	Team	Apps	(Gls)
2013–2019	Saipa	26	(0)
2015–2017	Tractor (loan)	60	(0)
2018–2023	Tractor	84	(0)
2023–2025	Gol Gohar	54	(0)
2025–2026	Sepahan	7	(0)
2026–	Gol Gohar	1	(0)

International career^{‡}
2014–2016	Iran U23	13	(1)
2016–	Iran	1	(0)
- * Club domestic league appearances and goals as of 31 October 2025 ‡ National team caps and goals as of 10 November 2016

Mohammad Reza Akhbari (Persian: محمدرضا اخباری; born 15 February 1993) is an Iranian footballer who plays as a goalkeeper for Gol Gohar and the Iran national team.

== Club career ==
=== Saipa ===
Ahkbari started his career with Saipa at the youth level, one of the unknown young players presented to the Iranian football by coach Engin Firat. He debuted in the last fixture of the 2013–14 Iran Pro League against Saba Qom as a starter.

== International career ==
=== Youth ===
Akhbari was invited to the Iran U23 preliminary camp by Nelo Vingada to preparation for Incheon 2014 and 2016 AFC U-22 Championship (Summer Olympic qualification). He was named in Iran U23 final list for Incheon 2014.

=== Senior ===
He was invited to Iran senior national team for the first time on 12 March 2016 by Carlos Queiroz for two upcoming matches against India and Oman during 2018 FIFA World Cup qualification. However, he did not play. He played his first international match on 8 June 2016 in a friendly against Kyrgyzstan, coming as a substitute of Alireza Haghighi in the second half.

=== International ===
As of match played 10 November 2016

Appearances and goals by national team and year
National team	Year	Apps	Goals
Iran
Iran	2016	1	0
Total		1	0
