= Habib Far Abbasi =

Footballer

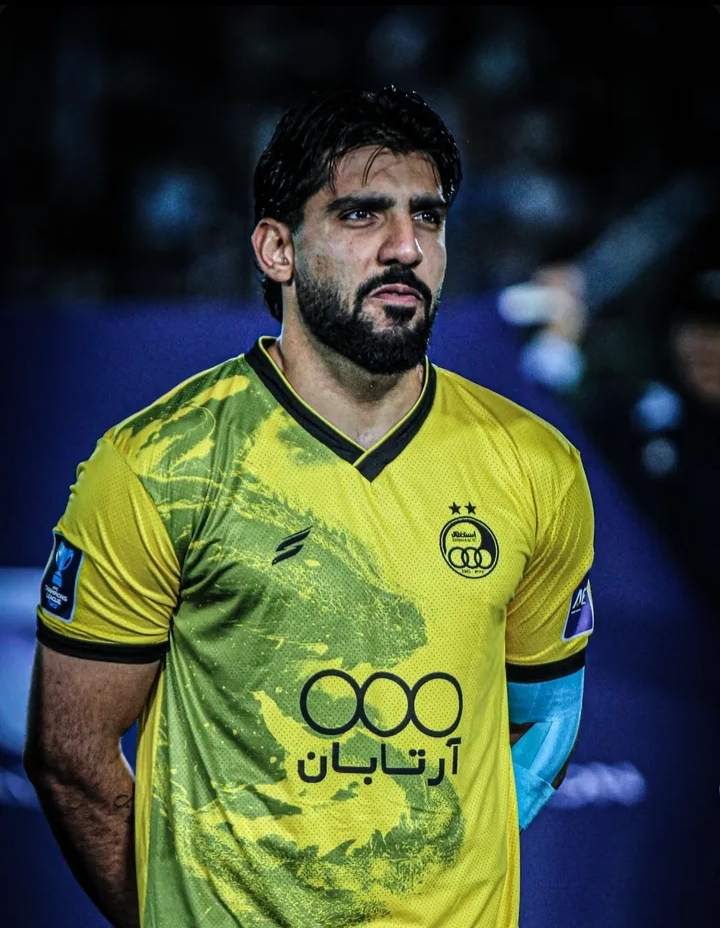
- Far Abbasi with Esteghlal in 2025

Personal information
- Date of birth: 4 September 1997 (age 29)
- Place of birth: Masjed Soleyman, Iran
- Height: 1.89 m (6 ft 2 in)
- Position: Goalkeeper

Team information
- Current team: Esteghlal
- Number: 76

Youth career
- 2016–2017: Naft M.I.S

Senior career*
Years	Team	Apps	(Gls)
2017–2020	Naft M.I.S	23	(0)
2020–2021	Tractor	4	(0)
2021–2025	Zob Ahan	59	(0)
2024–2025	→ Malavan (loan)	42	(0)
2025–	Esteghlal	21	(0)

International career^{‡}
2020	Iran U23	3	(0)
2026–	Iran	1	(0)
- * Club domestic league appearances and goals as of 7 November 2026 ‡ National team caps and goals as of 14 November 2026

Habib Far Abbasi (Persian: حبیب فرعباسی; born 4 September 1997) is an Iranian football goalkeeper who plays for Persian Gulf Pro League club Esteghlal and the Iran national team.

== Career statistics ==
=== Club ===
As of match played 7 November 2026

club	Season	League			Cup		Continental		Other		Total	
club	Season	League	Apps	Goals	Apps	Goals	Apps	Goals	Apps	Goals	Apps	Goals
Nafm MIS	2018–19	Persian Gulf Pro League	8	0	1	0	-	-	-	-	9	0
Nafm MIS	2019–20	Persian Gulf Pro League	15	0	2	0	-	-	-	-	17	0
Nafm MIS	Total		23	0	3	0	0	0	0	0	26	0
Tractor	2020–21	Persian Gulf Pro League	4	0	0	0	0	0	0	0	4	0
Zob Ahan	2021–22	Persian Gulf Pro League	25	0	1	0	-	-	-	-	26	0
Zob Ahan	2022–23	Persian Gulf Pro League	24	0	0	0	-	-	-	-	24	0
Zob Ahan	2023–24	Persian Gulf Pro League	10	0	0	0	-	-	-	-	10	0
Zob Ahan	Total		59	0	1	0	0	0	0	0	60	0
Malavan	2023–24	Persian Gulf Pro League	14	0	1	0	-	-	-	-	15	0
Malavan	2024–25	Persian Gulf Pro League	28	0	5	0	-	-	-	-	33	0
Malavan	Total		42	0	6	0	0	0	0	0	48	0
Esteghlal	2025–26	Persian Gulf Pro League	10	0	1	0	4	0	0	0	15	0
Esteghlal	2026–27	Persian Gulf Pro League	11	0	0	0	4	0	0	0	15	0
Esteghlal	Total		21	0	1	0	8	0	0	0	30	0
Career Total			149	0	11	0	8	0	0	0	168	0

=== International ===
As of match played 14 November 2026

Appearances and goals by national team and year
National team	Year	Apps	Goals
Iran
Iran	2026	1	0
Total		1	0
