= Reza Sharbati =

Iranian footballer (born 1995)

Personal information
- Date of birth: February 16, 1995 (age 31)
- Place of birth: Mashhad, Iran
- Height: 1.79 m (5 ft 10 in)
- Positions: Left back; left midfielder

Team information
- Current team: Awana
- Number: 3

Youth career
- Siah Jamegan

Senior career*
Years	Team	Apps	(Gls)
2013–2019	Siah Jamegan	65	(0)
2018–2019	→ Tractor (loan)	20	(0)
2019–2020	Foolad	0	(0)
2020–2021	Gol Gohar Sirnan	1	(0)
2021–2022	Vista Turbine	25	(0)
2022–2023	Omid Vahdat		
2023	Panik	12	(0)
2023–2024	Setaregan Sorkh	13	(0)
2024–	Awana		
- * Club domestic league appearances and goals as of 14 May 2024

Reza Sharbati (Persian: رضا شربتی; born 16 February 1995) is an Iranian footballer who plays for Awana as a left back.

== Club career ==
Sharbati started his career with Siah Jamegan from youth levels. He made his professional debut for Siah Jamegan on 13 August 2015, in 1–0 win against Naft Tehran as a starter.

== Club career statistics ==
Club	Division	Season	League		Hazfi Cup		Asia		Total	
Club	Division	Season	Apps	Goals	Apps	Goals	Apps	Goals	Apps	Goals
Siah Jamegan	Division 1	2013–14	1	0	0	0	–	–	1	0
Siah Jamegan	Division 1	2014–15	4	0	0	0	–	–	4	0
Siah Jamegan	PGL	2015–16	23	0	1	0	–	–	23	0
Siah Jamegan	PGL	2016–17	26	0	0	0	–	–	26	0
Siah Jamegan	PGL	2017–18	15	0	1	0	–	–	16	0
Tractor	PGL	2017–18	14	0	1	0	3	0	18	0
Career total			83	0	3	0	3	0	89	0
