= Ghaem Eslamikhah =

Iranian footballer

Personal information
- Date of birth: 17 January 1995 (age 31)
- Place of birth: Dehdasht, Iran
- Height: 1.74 m (5 ft 9 in)
- Position: Attacking midfielder

Team information
- Current team: Malavan
- Number: 10

Youth career
- –2016: Baadraan

Senior career*
Years	Team	Apps	(Gls)
2013–2014	Shahrdari Yasuj		
2014–2015	Foolad Yasuj		
2015–2016	Naft Gachsaran		
2016–2017	Baadraan	35	(7)
2017–2019	Tractor	9	(0)
2019–2020	Machine Sazi	22	(1)
2020–2023	Mes Rafsanjan	34	(3)
2023–2024	Havadar	16	(0)
2024–2025	Gol Gohar	11	(1)
2024–2025	→ Malavan (loan)	21	(4)
2025–	Malavan	27	(2)

International career^{‡}
2017	Iran U23	1	(0)
- * Club domestic league appearances and goals as of 18 April 2025 ‡ National team caps and goals as of 16 March 2017

Ghaem Eslamikhah (Persian: قائم اسلامی خواه; born 17 January 1995) is an Iranian football midfielder who plays for Malavan in the Persian Gulf Pro League.
