= Aref Gholampour =

Iranian footballer

Personal information
- Date of birth: 22 May 1999 (age 27)
- Place of birth: Izeh, Iran
- Height: 1.75 m (5 ft 9 in)
- Position: Defensive midfielder

Team information
- Current team: Navad Urmia
- Number: 23

Youth career
- 2018–2019: Saipa
- 2019–2020: Esteghlal

Senior career*
Years	Team	Apps	(Gls)
2020–2022	Foolad	2	(0)
2022	Qashqai	4	(0)
2022–2023	Naft Gachsaran		
2023–2024	Foolad B		
2024–	Navad Urmia		
- * Club domestic league appearances and goals as of 7 June 2022

Aref Gholampour (Persian: عارف غلام پور; born 22 May 1999) is an Iranian football midfielder who plays for Navad Urmia in League 2.
