= Abolfazl Razzaghpour =

Iranian association football player

Personal information
- Full name: Abolfazl Razzaghpour
- Date of birth: 17 September 1997 (age 29)
- Place of birth: Qaem Shahr, Iran
- Height: 1.78 m (5 ft 10 in)
- Position: Left-back

Team information
- Current team: Foolad
- Number: 2

Youth career
- 2013–2016: Nassaji

Senior career*
Years	Team	Apps	(Gls)
2016–2017	Nassaji	8	(0)
2017–2019	Paykan	12	(0)
2019–2023	Tractor	67	(2)
2020	→ Shahin Bushehr (loan)	14	(2)
2020–2021	→ Machine Sazi (loan)	17	(0)
2023–2025	Gol Gohar	57	(0)
2025–	Foolad	33	(2)

International career^{‡}
2016–2017	Iran U20	7	(9)
2017–2019	Iran U23	12	(0)
- * Club domestic league appearances and goals as of 2 May 2025 ‡ National team caps and goals as of 26 March 2019

Abolfazl Razzaghpour (Persian: ابوالفضل رزاق پور; born 17 September 1997) is an Iranian footballer who plays as a defender for Foolad in the Persian Gulf Pro League.

== Club career ==
=== Club career statistics ===
As of 31 May 2018.

Club	Division	Season	League		Hazfi Cup		Asia		Other		Total	
Club	Division	Season	Apps	Goals	Apps	Goals	Apps	Goals	Apps	Goals	Apps	Goals
Nassaji	Division 1	2016–17	8	0	0	0	–	–	0	0	8	0
Paykan	Pro League	2017–18	10	0	1	0	–	–	0	0	11	0
Paykan	Pro League	2018-19	2	0	1	0	0	0	0	0	3	0
Paykan	Total		12	0	2	0	0	0	0	0	12	0
Shahin	Persian Gulf Pro League	2019-20	14	2	0	0	0	0	0	0	14	2
Machine Sazi	Persian Gulf Pro League	2020-21	17	0	1	0	0	0	0	0	18	0
Tractor	Persian Gulf Pro League	2020-21	11	1	1	0	6	0	1	0	19	1
Tractor	Persian Gulf Pro League	2021-22	27	1	1	0	0	0	0	0	28	1
Tractor	Persian Gulf Pro League	2022-23	28	0	1	0	0	0	0	0	29	0
Tractor	Total		66	2	3	0	6	0	1	0	76	2
Gol Gohar	Persian Gulf Pro League	2023-24	28	0	4	1	0	0	0	0	32	1
Career Totals			145	4	10	1	6	0	1	0	162	5
