= Abolfazl Akasheh =

Iranian footballer

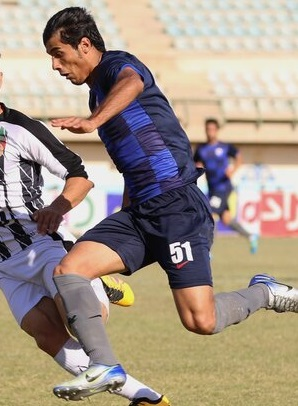

Personal information
- Full name: Abolfazl Babadi Akasheh
- Date of birth: 9 March 1999 (age 27)
- Place of birth: Borujen, Iran
- Position: Forward

Team information
- Current team: Mes Kerman

Youth career
- 2014–2018: Zob Ahan
- 2018: Gol Gohar

Senior career*
Years	Team	Apps	(Gls)
2018–2019	Gol Gohar	0	(0)
2019	Arvand Khorramshahr	9	(1)
2019–2020	Sepahan	0	(0)
2020	→ Aluminium Arak (loan)	8	(4)
2020–2021	Zob Ahan	8	(0)
2021	Havadar	2	(0)
2021–2022	Shahr Khodro	16	(3)
2022–2023	Chadormalou	11	(2)
2023	Bandar Astara		
2023–2024	Esteghlal Mollasani	11	(3)
2024	Mes Kerman	15	(1)
2024–2026	Sanat Naft	11	(2)
2026–	Mes Kerman		

International career
2017–2019	Iran U20	8	(2)
- * Club domestic league appearances and goals as of 16 April 2025

Abolfazl Babadi Akasheh (Persian: ابوالفضل بابادی عکاشه; born 9 March 1999) is an Iranian footballer who plays as a forward for Mes Kerman in the Azadegan League.

Sepahan signed Akasheh in 2019. In January 2020, he moved on loan from Sepahan to Aluminium Arak. On 16 August 2020, he scored the goal that promoted Aluminium Arak to the Persian Gulf Pro League in a match against Damash Gilan in the 2019–20 Azadegan League.

On 21 September 2020, he appeared for Sepahan against Al Ain in the 2020 AFC Champions League.
