= Mohammad Papi =

Iranian footballer (born 1998)

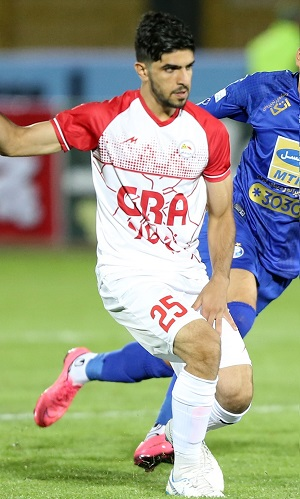

Personal information
- Full name: Mohammad Papi
- Date of birth: April 12, 1998 (age 28)
- Place of birth: Aligoudarz, Iran
- Height: 1.78 m (5 ft 10 in)
- Position: Right back

Team information
- Current team: Malavan
- Number: 20

Youth career
- 2012–2016: Sepahan

Senior career*
Years	Team	Apps	(Gls)
2015–2021	Sepahan	2	(0)
2016–2017	→ Tractor (loan)	0	(0)
2017–2018	→ Fajr Sepasi (loan)	20	(1)
2019	→ Naft Masjed Soleyman (loan)	9	(0)
2019–2020	→ Gol Reyhan Alborz (loan)	17	(1)
2020–2021	→ Paykan (loan)	0	(0)
2021	→ Baadraan (loan)	6	(0)
2021–2022	→ Vista Turbine (loan)	7	(2)
2022–2024	Shams Azar	62	(9)
2024–2025	Chadormalou	23	(1)
2025–	Malavan	32	(0)
- * Club domestic league appearances and goals as of 7 March 2024 @ 16:17(AEST) ‡ National team caps and goals as of 15 June 2017

Mohammad Papi (Persian: محمد پاپی, born April 12, 1998) is an Iranian football player who currently plays for Malavan in the Persian Gulf Pro League.

He is the younger brother of Hossein Papi; the former Sepahan player.
