= 2022–23 Sepahan S.C. season =

Sepahan
22–23 season
- Chairman: Mohammad Reza Saket
- Manager: José Morais
- Stadium: Naghsh-e Jahan Stadium
- Persian Gulf Pro League: 2nd
- Hazfi Cup: Round of 16
Home colours	Away colours	Third colours

The 2022–23 season is Sepahan's 69th season in existence, and their 42nd consecutive season in the top flight of Iran football. It is also the club's 22nd consecutive season in the Persian Gulf Pro League. The club will compete in the Persian Gulf Pro League and Hazfi Cup.

== First-team squad ==
Last updated: 27 January 2023

Note: Flags indicate national team as defined under FIFA eligibility rules; some limited exceptions apply. Players may hold more than one non-FIFA nationality.

No.	Pos.	Nation	Player
5	MF	POR	Manuel Fernandes
6	MF	IRI	Masoud Rigi
8	MF	IRI	Yasin Salmani ^{U21}
9	DF	IRI	Ramin Rezaeian (vice-captain)
10	FW	IRI	Farshad Ahmadzadeh
11	MF	BRA	Ygor Catatau
12	GK	IRI	Ali Keykhosravi ^{U25}
14	FW	IRI	Arya Yousefi ^{U21}
17	MF	IRI	Jalaleddin Alimohammadi (captain)
18	DF	IRI	Milad Zakipour
19	DF	IRI	Omid Noorafkan
20	FW	IRI	Isa Moradi
21	MF	IRI	Mohammad Karimi
22	GK	IRI	Mohammad Sadegh Salehi ^{U21}

No.	Pos.	Nation	Player
25	FW	IRI	Reza Bakhtiarizadeh ^{U21}
41	FW	BDI	Elvis Kamsoba
44	GK	IRI	Nima Mirzazad
58	DF	IRI	Mohammad Daneshgar
66	MF	IRI	Mohammad Ghorbani ^{U23}
70	FW	IRI	Shahriyar Moghanlou
76	GK	IRI	Payam Niazmand (on loan from Portimonense)
80	MF	IRI	Arshia Sarshogh ^{U21}
81	FW	IRI	Mohammad Alinejad
86	MF	IRI	Mohammad Javad Hosseinnejad ^{U21}
88	MF	IRI	Ahmad Reza Mousavi ^{U21}
91	DF	BRA	Nilson Júnior
99	DF	IRI	Siavash Yazdani

- U21 = Under 21 year player. U23 = Under 23 year player. U25 = Under 25 year player. INJ = Out of main squad due to injury.

== Transfers ==
=== Summer ===
In:

No.	Pos.	Nation	Player
45	GK	IRI	Nima Mirzazad (Loan return from Sanat Naft)
18	DF	IRI	Milad Zakipour (from Gol Gohar Sirjan)
58	DF	IRI	Mohammad Daneshgar (from Esteghlal)
60	MF	IRI	Mohammad Alinejad (from Aluminium Arak)
9	DF	IRI	Ramin Rezaeian (from Persepolis)
20	FW	BDI	Elvis Kamsoba (from (Australia) Sydney)
15	MF	POR	Manuel Fernandes (from (Greece) Apollon Smyrnis)
3	DF	BRA	Renato Silviera (from (Brazil) Vila Nova)
5	DF	BRA	Nilson Júnior (from (Brazil) Sampaio Corrêa)
86	MF	IRI	Mohammad Javad Hosseinnejad ^{U21} (from Sepahan U19)
80	MF	IRI	Arshia Sarshogh ^{U21} (from Sepahan U19)
88	MF	IRI	Ahmad Reza Mousavi ^{U21} (from Sepahan U19)
26	FW	IRI	Reza Bakhtiarizadeh ^{U21} (from Sepahan U19)
20	FW	IRI	Isa Moradi (from Khooshe Talaei Saveh)
16	GK	IRI	Payam Niazmand (On loan from Portimonense)
66	MF	IRI	Mohammad Ghorbani ^{U23} (from Nassaji)

Out:

No.	Pos.	Nation	Player
11	DF	IRI	Danial Esmaeilifar (to Persepolis)
30	DF	GEO	Giorgi Gvelesiani (to Persepolis)
73	MF	IRI	Soroush Rafiei (to Persepolis)
9	FW	IRI	Sajjad Shahbazzadeh (to Esteghlal)
77	MF	IRI	Reza Mirzaei (to Esteghlal)
1	GK	AUT	Christopher Knett (to Foolad)
16	DF	IRI	Davoud Rajabi (to Fajr Sepasi)
5	DF	IRI	Ezzatollah Pourghaz (to Havadar)
20	MF	IRI	Milad Jahani (to Malavan)
25	DF	IRI	Amir Saman Ranjbar ^{U23} (to Van Pars Naghsh-e-Jahan)
22	GK	IRI	Hojjat Sedghi (Unattached)
38	FW	IRI	Alireza Sadeghi ^{U25} (Loan return from Aluminium Arak - Unattached)
66	DF	IRI	Mohammadreza Mehdizadeh (Unattached)
23	FW	IRI	Amir Mohammad Mohkamkar ^{U21} (Unattached)

=== Winter ===
In:

No.	Pos.	Nation	Player
11	MF	BRA	Ygor Catatau (from (Brazil) Sampaio Corrêa)
22	GK	IRI	Mohammad Sadegh Salehi ^{U21} (from Sepahan U19)
99	DF	IRI	Siavash Yazdani (from Esteghlal)

Out:

No.	Pos.	Nation	Player
1	GK	IRI	Mohammad Rashid Mazaheri (to Paykan)
2	DF	IRI	Mohammad Nejadmehdi (to Foolad)
3	DF	BRA	Renato Silveira (to (Brazil) Novorizontino)
7	MF	IRI	Mohammad Reza Hosseini (On loan to Gol Gohar)
27	MF	IRI	Hassan Shoushtari (to Saipa)
66	DF	IRI	Mohammadreza Mehdizadeh (to Nassaji)

== Pre-season and friendlies ==
24 July 2022 Friendly	Daricaspor (Turkey)	0–4	(Iran) Sepahan	İzmit, Turkey
		Report		Stadium: Naghsh-e-Jahan; Attendance: 0

26 July 2022 Friendly	İstanbulspor (Turkey)	1–1	(Iran) Sepahan	İzmit, Turkey
		Report		Stadium: Naghsh-e-Jahan; Attendance: 0

29 July 2022 Friendly	Mesaimeer (Turkey)	1–0	(Iran) Sepahan	İzmit, Turkey
		Report		Stadium: Naghsh-e-Jahan; Attendance: 0

5 August 2022 Friendly	Sepahan	4–0	Khooshe Talaei	Isfahan
		Report		Stadium: Naghsh-e-Jahan; Attendance: 0

17 February 2023 Friendly	Sepahan (Iran)	2–0	(Russia) Zenit	Isfahan, Iran
15:30 IRDT (UTC+03:30)	Ghorbani 4'; Daneshgar 45+1'	Report		Stadium: Naghsh-e-Jahan; Attendance: 30,000; Referee: Mooud Bonyadifar

== Competitions ==
=== Overview ===
Competition	First match	Last match	Starting round	Final position	Record							
Competition	First match	Last match	Starting round	Final position	Pld	W	D	L	GF	GA	GD	Win %
Persian Gulf Pro League	12 August 2022	18 May 2023	Matchday 1	Runners-up	30	19	8	3	49	17	+32	63.33
Hazfi Cup	11 January 2023	22 February 2023	Round of 32	Round of 16	2	1	0	1	5	4	+1	50.00
Total					32	20	8	4	54	21	+33	62.50

Source: Soccerway

=== Persian Gulf Pro League ===
==== Standings ====
Pos	Team	Pld	W	D	L	GF	GA	GD	Pts	Qualification or relegation
1	Persepolis (C)	30	20	6	4	46	13	+33	66	Qualification for 2023–24 AFC Champions League group stage
2	Sepahan	30	19	8	3	49	17	+32	65	Qualification for 2023–24 AFC Champions League group stage
3	Esteghlal (Note: Esteghlal did not pay its debts on time and did not obtain an AFC license. They were therefore unable to participate in AFC competitions.)	30	18	8	4	52	22	+30	62	
4	Tractor	30	15	7	8	42	34	+8	52	Qualification for 2023–24 AFC Champions League qualifying play-offs
5	Mes Rafsanjan	30	11	14	5	30	15	+15	47	

Source: Iran Football League Organization - League Full Table, Iplstats
Rules for classification: 1) Points; 2) Head-to-head points; 3) Head-to-head goal difference; 4) Total goal difference; 5) Total goals scored; 6) Play-off at neutral venue.

==== Results by round ====
Round	1	2	3	4	5	6	7	8	9	10	11	12	13	14	15	16	17	18	19	20	21	22	23	24	25	26	27	28	29	30
Ground	A	H	A	H	A	H	A	H	A	H	A	A	H	A	H	H	A	H	A	H	A	H	A	H	A	H	H	A	H	A
Result	W	W	D	L	D	D	W	D	W	W	D	D	W	L	W	W	W	W	W	W	D	W	W	W	L	W	D	W	W	W
Position	1	1	1	3	4	4	3	4	3	2	4	4	4	4	2	2	2	1	1	1	1	1	1	1	1	1	2	2	2	2

First match(es) will be played on 12 August 2022. Source: "Iran Football League Organization - League Full Table".
A = Away; H = Home; W = Win; D = Draw; L = Loss

==== Matches ====
Win Draw Loss Postponed

August 12, 2022 1	Esteghlal	0–2	Sepahan	Tehran
19:00 UTC+04:30		Report	Rezaeian (yellow card) 6', (goal) 57'; Alinejad (yellow card) 49'; Salmani 53'; Karimi (yellow card) 90+1'	Stadium: Azadi; Attendance: 0 Referee: Bijan Heydari
Note: The match was played behind closed doors due to the problems of the electronic ticketing system of the clubs.

August 18, 2022 2	Sepahan	2–1	Nassaji	Isfahan
		Report		Stadium: Naghsh-e-Jahan; Attendance: 7,000

August 26, 2022 3	Gol Gohar	2–2	Sepahan	Sirjan
		Report		Stadium: Shahid Qasem Soleimani; Attendance: 4,000

August 31, 2022 4	Sepahan	0–1	Foolad	Isfahan
		Report		Stadium: Naghsh-e-Jahan; Attendance: 5,000

September 5, 2022 5	Zob Ahan	1–1	Sepahan	Fooladshahr
		Report		Stadium: Foolad Shahr; Attendance: 3,000

September 10, 2022 6	Sepahan	0–0	Aluminium Arak	Isfahan
		Report		Stadium: Naghsh-e-Jahan; Attendance: 8,000

October 2, 2022 7	Havadar	1–2	Sepahan	Tehran
		Report		Stadium: Shahid Dastgerdi

7 October 2022 8	Sepahan	0 – 0	Persepolis	Isfahan
20:00 IRST (UTC+03:30)		Report	Omri (yellow card) 68'	Stadium: Naghsh-e Jahan Stadium; Attendance: 0 Referee: Amir Arab Baraghi

October 13, 2022 9	Sanat Naft	0–2	Sepahan	Abadan
		Report		Stadium: Takhti

October 20, 2022 10	Sepahan	4–2	Tractor	Isfahan
		Report		Stadium: Naghsh-e-Jahan

October 28, 2022 11	Mes Rafsanjan	0–0	Sepahan	Rafsanjan
		Report		Stadium: Shohadaye Mes Rafsanjan

December 19, 2022 12	Malavan	0–0	Sepahan	Bandar-e Anzali
		Report		Stadium: Sirous Ghayeghran

December 24, 2022 13	Sepahan	4–0	Naft MIS	Isfahan
		Report		Stadium: Naghsh-e-Jahan

December 31, 2022 14	Paykan	1–0	Sepahan	Karaj
		Report		Stadium: Enghelab

January 5, 2023 15	Sepahan	2–0	Mes Kerman	Isfahan
		Report		Stadium: Naghsh-e-Jahan

19 January 2023 16	Sepahan	2–1	Esteghlal	Isfahan
16:30 IRST (UTC+03:30)	Moghanlou (yellow card) 36'; Noorafkan 50'; Karimi (yellow card) 86'; Rezaeian 90+5' (pen.)	Report	Hardani (yellow card) 23'; Motahari 58'; Babaei (yellow card) 75'; Mohebi (yellow card) 79'	Stadium: Naghsh-e-Jahan; Attendance: 0 Referee: Hassan Akrami

January 26, 2023 17	Nassaji	0–1	Sepahan	Qaem Shahr
		Report		Stadium: Vatani

February 1, 2023 18	Sepahan	4–1	Gol Gohar	Isfahan
		Report		Stadium: Naghsh-e-Jahan

February 7, 2023 19	Foolad	0–1	Sepahan	Ahvaz
		Report		Stadium: Foolad Arena

February 14, 2023 20	Sepahan	2–1	Zob Ahan	Isfahan
		Report		Stadium: Naghsh-e-Jahan

February 28, 2023 21	Aluminium Arak	1–1	Sepahan	Arak
		Report		Stadium: Imam Khomeini

March 5, 2023 22	Sepahan	3–1	Havadar	Isfahan
		Report		Stadium: Naghsh-e-Jahan

March 11, 2023 23	Persepolis	0 – 1	Sepahan	Tehran
16:45 IRST (UTC+03:30)	Pereira (yellow card) 39' (red card) 45+2'	Report	Rezaeian (yellow card) 50'; Rigi (yellow card) 70'; Daneshgar (yellow card) 90+1'; Karimi 90+4'	Stadium: Azadi Stadium; Referee: Payam Heydari

March 31, 2023 24	Sepahan	1–0	Sanat Naft	Isfahan
		Report		Stadium: Naghsh-e-Jahan

April 7, 2023 25	Tractor	1–0	Sepahan	Tabriz
		Report		Stadium: Yadegar-e Emam

April 15, 2023 26	Sepahan	2–0	Mes Rafsanjan	Isfahan
		Report		Stadium: Naghsh-e-Jahan

April 24, 2023 27	Sepahan	1–1	Malavan	Isfahan
		Report		Stadium: Naghsh-e-Jahan

May 5, 2023 28	Naft MIS	0–2	Sepahan	Masjed Soleyman
		Report		Stadium: Behnam Mohammadi

May 12, 2023 29	Sepahan	5–0	Paykan	Isfahan
		Report		Stadium: Naghsh-e-Jahan

May 18, 2023 30	Mes Kerman	1–2	Sepahan	Kerman
		Report		Stadium: Shohadaye Mes Kerman

=== Hazfi Cup ===
11 January 2023 Round of 32	Sepahan	3–0	Saipa	Isfahan
		Report		Stadium: Naghsh-e-Jahan

22 February 2023 Round of 16	Sepahan	2–4 (a.e.t.)	Persepolis	Isfahan
15:00 IRST (UTC+03:30)	Yazdani (yellow card) 11' (yellow-red card) 99'; Daneshgar (yellow card) 21'; Esmaeilifar 41' (o.g.); Rigi (yellow card) 55'; Ahmadzadeh 74'; Noorafkan (yellow card) 78'; Rezaeian (yellow card) 95'	Report	Gvelesiani 12' (pen.) 100' (pen.); Alekasir 58'; Asadbeigi (yellow card) 65'; Beiranvand (yellow card) 75'; Sarlak (yellow card) 75'; Nemati 94'	Stadium: Naghsh-e-Jahan; Referee: Bijan Heydari
