= List of Iranian football transfers summer 2022 =

This is a list of Iranian football transfers for the 2022 summer transfer window. Only moves from Persian Gulf Pro League are listed. The summer transfer window will begin on 13 June 2022 and closes at midnight on 31 August 2022. Players without a club may join at any time. This list includes transfers featuring at least one Iran Football League club which were completed after the end of the winter 2021–22 transfer window on 12 February 2022 and before the end of the 2022 summer window.

== Rules and regulations ==
According to Iran Football Federation rules for 2022–23 Persian Gulf Pro League, each Football Club is allowed to take up to maximum 7 new Iranian player from the other clubs who already played in the 2021–22 Persian Gulf Pro League season. In addition to these seven new players, each club is allowed to take up to 3 players from Free agent (who did not play in 2022–23 Persian Gulf Pro League season or doesn't list in any 2022–23 League after season's start) during the season. Under-25 years old players must be under contract of the club in the previous season. Under-21 and under-19 years old players can also be signed during the season.

=== Players limits ===
The Iranian Football Clubs who participate in 22–23 Iranian football different levels are allowed to have up to maximum 63 players in their player lists, which will be categorized in the following groups:

- Up to maximum 20 adult (without any age limit) players
- Up to maximum 4 under-25 players (i.e. the player whose birth is after 1 January 1998).
- Up to maximum 9 under-23 players (i.e. the player whose birth is after 1 January 2000).
- Up to maximum 15 under-21 players (i.e. the player whose birth is after 1 January 2002).
- Up to maximum 15 under-19 players (i.e. the player whose birth is after 1 January 2004).

== Persian Gulf Pro League ==
=== Aluminium ===
In:

No.	Pos.	Nation	Player

Out:

No.	Pos.	Nation	Player
—	FW	IRN	Alireza Sadeghi ^{U25} (Loan return to Sepahan)
—	MF	IRN	Mohammad Alinejad (to Sepahan)

=== Esteghlal ===
In:

No.	Pos.	Nation	Player
88	MF	IRN	Arash Rezavand (Loan return from Foolad)
10	FW	IRN	Sajjad Shahbazzadeh (from Sepahan)
19	MF	IRN	Reza Mirzaei (from Sepahan)
26	MF	IRN	Omid Hamedifar (from Sanat Naft)
80	MF	IRN	Mohammad Hossein Zavari (from Sanat Naft)
6	DF	IRN	Mohammad Hosseini (from Havadar)
18	FW	IRN	Peyman Babaei (from Tractor)
3	DF	IRN	Mohammad Hossein Moradmand (Loan return from Malavan)
77	FW	IRN	Mohammad Mohebi (On loan from (Portugal) Santa Clara)
20	FW	IRN	Mehdi Ghayedi (On loan from (United Arab Emirates) Shabab Al Ahli)
7	DF	IRN	Siavash Yazdani (Loan return from Malavan)

Out:

No.	Pos.	Nation	Player
39	FW	BEN	Rudy Gestede (Unattached)
70	DF	IRN	Mohammad Daneshgar (to Sepahan)
—	MF	IRN	Alireza Khodabakhshi (to Havadar)
99	MF	IRN	Amirhossein Hosseinzadeh (to (Belgium) Charleroi)
27	DF	IRN	Matin Karimzadeh (to Nassaji Mazandaran)
10	FW	IRN	Amin Ghaseminejad (to Gol Gohar)
21	DF	IRN	Voria Ghafouri (to Foolad)
15	MF	IRN	Sina Khadempour (to Chooka Talesh)
17	FW	IRN	Zakaria Moradi (to Chooka Talesh)
42	FW	IRN	Fardin Rabet (to (Sweden) Dalkurd)
41	DF	IRN	Arash Dajliri (Unattached)
77	MF	IRN	Reza Azari (Unattached)
44	DF	IRN	Mohammad Javad Behafarin (Unattached)
6	DF	IRN	Mohammad Hosseini (to Tractor)

=== Foolad ===
In:

No.	Pos.	Nation	Player
—	GK	AUT	Christopher Knett (from Sepahan)
—	DF	IRN	Voria Ghafouri (from Esteghlal)

Out:

No.	Pos.	Nation	Player
88	MF	IRN	Arash Rezavand (Loan return to Esteghlal)

=== Gol Gohar ===
In:

No.	Pos.	Nation	Player
—	FW	IRN	Amin Ghaseminejad (from Esteghlal)

Out:

No.	Pos.	Nation	Player
—	DF	IRN	Milad Zakipour (to Sepahan)

=== Havadar ===
In:

No.	Pos.	Nation	Player
—	DF	IRN	Ezzatollah Pourghaz (from Sepahan)
—	MF	IRN	Alireza Khodabakhshi (from Esteghlal)

Out:

No.	Pos.	Nation	Player
—	DF	IRN	Mohammad Hosseini (to Esteghlal)

=== Malavan ===
In:

No.	Pos.	Nation	Player

Out:

No.	Pos.	Nation	Player
—	DF	IRN	Mohammad Hossein Moradmand (Loan return to Esteghlal)
—	DF	IRN	Siavash Yazdani (Loan return to Esteghlal)

=== Mes Kerman ===
In:

No.	Pos.	Nation	Player

Out:

No.	Pos.	Nation	Player

=== Mes Rafsanjan ===
In:

No.	Pos.	Nation	Player

Out:

No.	Pos.	Nation	Player

=== Naft Masjed-Soleyman ===
In:

No.	Pos.	Nation	Player

Out:

No.	Pos.	Nation	Player

=== Nassaji ===
In:

No.	Pos.	Nation	Player
—	DF	IRN	Matin Karimzadeh (from Esteghlal)

Out:

No.	Pos.	Nation	Player

=== Paykan ===
In:

No.	Pos.	Nation	Player

Out:

No.	Pos.	Nation	Player

=== Persepolis ===
In:

No.	Pos.	Nation	Player
—	DF	IRN	Danial Esmaeilifar (from Sepahan)
—	DF	GEO	Giorgi Gvelesiani (from Sepahan)
—	MF	IRN	Soroush Rafiei (from Sepahan)

Out:

No.	Pos.	Nation	Player
—	DF	IRN	Ramin Rezaian (to Sepahan)

=== Sanat Naft ===
In:

No.	Pos.	Nation	Player

Out:

No.	Pos.	Nation	Player
—	GK	IRN	Nima Mirzazad (Loan return to Sepahan)
—	MF	IRN	Omid Hamedifar (to Esteghlal)
—	MF	IRN	Mohammad Hossein Zavari (to Esteghlal)

=== Sepahan ===
In:

No.	Pos.	Nation	Player
44	GK	IRN	Nima Mirzazad (Loan return from Sanat Naft)
18	DF	IRN	Milad Zakipour (from Gol Gohar Sirjan)
58	DF	IRN	Mohammad Daneshgar (from Esteghlal)
81	MF	IRN	Mohammad Alinejad (from Aluminium Arak)
9	DF	IRN	Ramin Rezaeian (from Persepolis)
41	FW	BDI	Elvis Kamsoba (from (Australia) Sydney)
5	MF	POR	Manuel Fernandes (from (Greece) Apollon Smyrnis)
3	DF	BRA	Renato (from (Brazil) Vila Nova)
91	DF	BRA	Nilson Júnior (from (Brazil) Sampaio Corrêa)
86	MF	IRN	Mohammad Javad Hosseinnejad ^{U21} (from Sepahan U19)
80	MF	IRN	Arshia Sarshogh ^{U21} (from Sepahan U19)
88	MF	IRN	Ahmad Reza Mousavi ^{U21} (from Sepahan U19)
25	FW	IRN	Reza Bakhtiarizadeh ^{U21} (from Sepahan U19)
20	FW	IRN	Isa Moradi (from Khooshe Talaei Saveh)
76	GK	IRN	Payam Niazmand (On loan from (Portugal) Portimonense)
66	MF	IRN	Mohammad Ghorbani ^{U23} (from Nassaji)

Out:

No.	Pos.	Nation	Player
11	DF	IRN	Danial Esmaeilifar (to Persepolis)
30	DF	GEO	Giorgi Gvelesiani (to Persepolis)
73	MF	IRN	Soroush Rafiei (to Persepolis)
9	FW	IRN	Sajjad Shahbazzadeh (to Esteghlal)
77	MF	IRN	Reza Mirzaei (to Esteghlal)
1	GK	AUT	Christopher Knett (to Foolad)
16	DF	IRN	Davoud Rajabi (to Fajr Sepasi)
5	DF	IRN	Ezzatollah Pourghaz (to Havadar)
20	MF	IRN	Milad Jahani (to Malavan)
25	DF	IRN	Amir Saman Ranjbar ^{U23} (to Van Pars Naghsh-e-Jahan)
22	GK	IRN	Hojjat Sedghi (Unattached)
38	FW	IRN	Alireza Sadeghi ^{U25} (Loan return from Aluminium Arak - Unattached)
66	DF	IRN	Mohammadreza Mehdizadeh (Unattached)
23	FW	IRN	Amir Mohammad Mohkamkar ^{U21} (Unattached)

=== Tractor ===
In:

No.	Pos.	Nation	Player
—	DF	IRN	Mohammad Hosseini (from Esteghlal)

Out:

No.	Pos.	Nation	Player
—	FW	IRN	Peyman Babaei (to Esteghlal)

=== Zob Ahan ===
In:

No.	Pos.	Nation	Player

Out:

No.	Pos.	Nation	Player
