= 2023–24 Sepahan S.C. season =

Sepahan
2023–24 season
- Chairman: Mohammad Reza Saket
- Manager: José Morais
- Stadium: Naghsh-e Jahan Stadium
- Pro League: 3rd
- Hazfi Cup: Winners
- AFC Champions League: Round of 16
Home colours	Away colours

The 2023–24 season is Sepahan's 70th season in existence, and their 43rd consecutive season in the top flight of Iranian football. It is also the club's 23rd consecutive season in the Persian Gulf Pro League. The club will compete in the Persian Gulf Pro League, Hazfi Cup and AFC Champions League.

== Players ==
Note: Flags indicate national team as defined under FIFA eligibility rules; some limited exceptions apply. Players may hold more than one non-FIFA nationality.

No.	Pos.	Nation	Player
1	GK	IRI	Payam Niazmand (vice-captain)
2	DF	IRI	Hadi Mohammadi
5	MF	IRI	Reza Asadi
6	MF	BFA	Bryan Dabo
8	MF	IRI	Mohammad Karimi (captain)
9	DF	IRI	Ramin Rezaeian
10	MF	IRI	Farshad Ahmadzadeh
11	FW	IRI	Kaveh Rezaei
13	GK	IRI	Mohammad Gerami ^{U21}
14	DF	IRI	Arya Yousefi ^{U23}
17	MF	IRI	Esmaeil Gholizadeh ^{U21}
18	DF	IRI	Milad Zakipour

No.	Pos.	Nation	Player
19	DF	IRI	Omid Noorafkan (third-captain)
22	GK	IRI	Sadegh Salehi ^{U21}
23	MF	IRI	Ahmad Reza Mousavi ^{U21}
33	FW	GHA	Issah Abass (on loan from Chaves)
44	GK	IRI	Nima Mirzazad
58	DF	IRI	Mohammad Daneshgar
70	FW	IRI	Shahriyar Moghanlou
77	MF	IRI	Ali Ahmadi ^{U21}
80	MF	IRI	Arshia Sarshogh ^{U21}
81	MF	IRI	Reza Shekari
86	MF	IRI	Mohammad Javad Hosseinnejad ^{U21}
99	DF	IRI	Siavash Yazdani

- U21 = Under-21 level player. U23 = Under-23 level player. SPE = Special group player. INJ = Out of main squad due to injury.

== Transfers ==
=== Summer ===
In:

No.	Pos.	Nation	Player
77	MF	IRI	Mohammad Reza Hosseini (Loan return from Gol Gohar)
1	GK	IRI	Payam Niazmand (from (Portugal) Portimonense, previously on loan)
26	FW	IRI	Ali Ahmadi ^{U21} (from Sepahan U19)
7	MF	IRI	Reza Shekari (from Gol Gohar)
11	FW	IRI	Kaveh Rezaei (from Tractor)
8	MF	IRI	Reza Asadi (from Tractor)
15	MF	IRI	Ehsan Pahlevan (from Foolad)
72	FW	IRI	Issa Alekasir (from Persepolis)
3	DF	IRI	Hadi Mohammadi (from Tractor)

Out:

No.	Pos.	Nation	Player
41	FW	BDI	Elvis Kamsoba (to (Indonesia) PSS Sleman)
11	MF	BRA	Ygor Catatau
15	MF	POR	Manuel Fernandes
25	FW	IRI	Reza Bakhtiarizadeh ^{U21} (to Sepahan U21)
8	MF	IRI	Yasin Salmani (to Persepolis)
23	DF	IRI	Sobhan Pasandideh (Loan return from Malavan / to Havadar)
6	MF	IRI	Masoud Rigi (to Persepolis)
26	MF	IRI	Amir Mohammad Mohkamkar ^{U21} (Loan return from Saipa / to Esteghlal Khuzestan)
27	MF	IRI	Hassan Shoushtari (Loan return from Saipa / to Esteghlal Khuzestan)
20	FW	IRI	Isa Moradi (On loan to Shams Azar)
17	MF	IRI	Jalaleddin Alimohammadi (to Mes Rafsanjan)
81	FW	IRI	Mohammad Alinejad (On loan to Foolad)
—	FW	IRI	Kasra Taheri (to (Russia) Rubin Kazan)

== Pre-season and friendlies ==
5 July 2022 Friendly	Sepahan (Iran)	8–0	(Moldova) Sucleia	Turkey
		Report

8 July 2022 Friendly	Sepahan (Iran)	3–1	(Turkey) JK Academy	Turkey
17:00 UTC+3		Report

== Competitions ==
=== Overview ===
Competition	Starting round	Final position	Record							
Competition	Starting round	Final position	Pld	W	D	L	GF	GA	GD	Win %
Pro League	Matchday 1	3rd	30	17	6	7	53	26	+27	56.67
Hazfi Cup	Round of 32	Winners	5	5	0	0	10	2	+8	100.00
AFC Champions League	Group stage	Round of 16	8	3	1	4	18	14	+4	37.50
Total			43	25	7	11	81	42	+39	58.14

Last updated: 13 July 2024.
Source: Competitions

=== Persian Gulf Pro League ===
==== Standings ====
Pos	Team	Pld	W	D	L	GF	GA	GD	Pts	Qualification or relegation
1	Persepolis (C)	30	20	8	2	45	18	+27	68	Qualification for the 2024–25 AFC Champions League Elite phase
2	Esteghlal	30	19	10	1	40	15	+25	67	Qualification for the 2024–25 AFC Champions League Elite phase
3	Sepahan	30	17	6	7	53	26	+27	57	Qualification for the 2024–25 AFC Champions League Elite qualifying play-offs (Note: Qualified as the 2023–24 Hazfi Cup winners.)
4	Tractor	30	16	6	8	42	22	+20	54	Qualification for the 2024–25 AFC Champions League Two group stage
5	Zob Ahan	30	11	9	10	30	29	+1	42	

Source: Iran Football League Organization - League Full Table, Iplstats
Rules for classification: 1) Points; 2) Head-to-head points; 3) Head-to-head goal difference; 4) Total goal difference; 5) Total goals scored; 6) Play-off at neutral venue.
(Note: Head-to-head record is used only after all the matches between the teams in question have been played).
(C) Champions

==== Results by round ====
Round	1	2	3	4	5	6	7	8	9	10	11	12	13	14	15	16	17	18	19	20	21	22	23	24	25	26	27	28	29	30
Ground	H	A	H	A	H	A	H	A	H	H	A	H	A	H	A	A	H	A	H	A	H	A	H	A	A	H	A	H	A	H
Result	W	W	W	W	W	L	W	D	L	W	W	W	W	L	L	D	W	L	L	W	W	L	D	W	D	D	D	W	W	W
Position	3	1	1	1	1	1	1	1	2	2	1	1	1	1	2	2	2	3	4	4	4	4	3	3	3	3	3	3	3	3

Updated to match(es) played on 13 July 2024. Source: "Ipl".
A = Away; H = Home; W = Win; D = Draw; L = Loss; P = Postponed

==== Matches ====
The league fixtures were announced on 9 August.

10 August 2023 1	Sepahan	3–1	Tractor	Isfahan
19:00 IRST (UTC+03:30)	Zakipour (yellow card) 6'; Moghanlou 11'; Shekari (yellow card) 12', (goal) 60'; Nilson (yellow card) 15' (yellow-red card) 79'; Asadi 25'; Ahmadzadeh (yellow card) 45+1'; Daneshgar (yellow card) 45+5'; Rezaei (yellow card) 90+7'	Report	Hadi (yellow card) 45+5' (yellow-red card) 86'; Karimazar 89', (yellow card) 90'; Aghajanpour (yellow card) 90+1'; Alves (yellow card) 90+6'; Khalilzadeh (yellow card) 90+7'	Stadium: Naghsh-e Jahan; Attendance: 35,000; Referee: Payam Heydari

2	Zob Ahan	0–2	Sepahan
		Report

3	Sepahan	1–0	Esteghlal
		Report

4	Paykan	1–3	Sepahan
		Report

5	Sepahan	3–1	Foolad
		Report

6	Gol Gohar	3–1	Sepahan
		Report

7	Sepahan	4–1	Sanat Naft
		Report

8	Nassaji Mazandaran	1–1	Sepahan
		Report

9	Sepahan	2–0	Malavan
		Report

10	Sepahan	1–0	Persepolis
		Report

11	Esteghlal Khuzestan	1–3	Sepahan
		Report

12	Sepahan	5–1	Mes Rafsanjan
		Report

13	Havadar	0–5	Sepahan
		Report

14	Sepahan	0–1	Aluminium Arak
		Report

15	Shams Azar	1–0	Sepahan
		Report

16	Tractor	0–0	Sepahan
		Report

17	Sepahan	1–0	Zob Ahan
		Report

18	Esteghlal	1–0	Sepahan
		Report

19	Sepahan	2–3	Paykan
		Report

20	Foolad	1–3	Sepahan
		Report

21	Sepahan	2–0	Gol Gohar
		Report

22	Sanat Naft	2–1	Sepahan
		Report

23	Sepahan	0–0	Nassaji Mazandaran
		Report

24	Malavan	1–2	Sepahan
		Report

25	Persepolis	0–0	Sepahan
		Report

26	Sepahan	1–1	Esteghlal Khuzestan
		Report

27	Mes Rafsanjan	1–1	Sepahan
		Report

28	Sepahan	2–0	Havadar
		Report

29	Aluminium Arak	0–1	Sepahan
		Report

30	Sepahan	4–1	Shams Azar
		Report

=== Hazfi Cup ===
4 March 2024 Round of 32	Sepahan	3–0	Shams Azar	Isfahan
17:30	Reza Asadi 24'; Omid Noorafkan60'; Reza Shekari71'			Stadium: Naghsh-e Jahan Stadium

26 April 2024 Round of 16	Esteghlal Mollasani	1–2	Sepahan	Ahvaz
19:30				Stadium: Ghadir Stadium

16 May 2024 Quarter-final	Sepahan	1–0	Malavan	Isfahan
19:30	Farshad Ahmadzadeh 39'			Stadium: Naghsh-e Jahan Stadium

15 June 2024 Semi-final	Sepahan (1)	2–1	Gol Gohar (1)

20 June 2024 Final	Sepahan	2–0	Mes Rafsanjan	Tehran
	Moghanlou 8', 23' (pen.)			Stadium: Azadi Stadium; Attendance: 15,000; Referee: Bijan Heydari

=== AFC Champions League ===
==== Group stage ====
Pos	Team	Pld	W	D	L	GF	GA	GD	Pts	Qualification	ITH	SEP	QWJ	AGK
1	(Saudi Arabia) Al-Ittihad	6	5	0	1	11	4	+7	15	Advance to round of 16	—	2–1	1–0	3–0
2	(Iran) Sepahan	6	3	1	2	16	8	+8	10 (Note: Ranked on head-to-head points: Sepahan 4, Al-Quwa Al-Jawiya 1.)	Advance to round of 16	0–3 (Note: The match was abandoned after Al-Ittihad walked off in protest due to the presence of a sculpture of Qasem Soleimani on the pitch. The match was awarded a 3–0 win to Al-Ittihad, with Sepahan also being fined $200,000 and banned from hosting its next three Asian Champions League matches at home.)	—	1–0	9–0
3	(Iraq) Al-Quwa Al-Jawiya	6	3	1	2	9	7	+2	10		2–0	2–2	—	3–2
4	(Uzbekistan) AGMK	6	0	0	6	5	22	−17	0		1–2	1–3	1–2	—

Source: AFC
Rules for classification: Tiebreakers
Notes:

18 September 2023 1	Al-Quwa Al-Jawiya (Iraq)	2–2	(Iran) Sepahan	Franso Hariri Stadium, (Note: Team did not use their own home stadium.) Erbil
19:00 UTC+3	Jasim 26', 88'	Report	Daneshgar 30'; Ghorbani 67'	Attendance: 10,327; Referee: Ma Ning (China)

2 October 2023 2	Sepahan (Iran)	0–3 (awd.)	(Saudi Arabia) Al Ittihad	Isfahan, Iran
19:30 UTC+3:30				Stadium: Naghsh-e Jahan Stadium
Note: The match was called off due to Al-Ittihad refusing to take the pitch over a bust of Qasem Soleimani. On 2 November 2023, AFC awarded a 3–0 win to Al-Ittihad.

23 October 2023 3	AGMK (Uzbekistan)	1–3	(Iran) Sepahan	OKMK Sport Majmuasi, Olmaliq
19:00 UTC+5	Mirakhmadov 36'	Report	Rezaeian 32', 49'; Asadi 59'	Attendance: 3,200; Referee: Omar Mohamed Al Ali (United Arab Emirates)

6 November 2023 4	Sepahan (Iran)	9–0	(Uzbekistan) AGMK	Azadi Stadium (Note: After an investigation about displaying a sculpture of Qasem Soleimani during the home match against Ittihad FC, Sepahan were banned from playing three home matches of this competition at Naghsh-e-Jahan Stadium. Since Sepahan qualified for the knockout stage, this ban will include the home leg in the round of 16.), Tehran
19:30 UTC+3:30	Ahmadzadeh 8'; Asadi 59'; Hosseinnejad 60', 90+3'; Ghorbani 62'; Rezaeian 71'; Alekasir 79', 87'; Moghanlou 82'	Report		Attendance: 4,721; Referee: Kim Jong-hyeok (South Korea)

27 November 2023 5	Sepahan (Iran)	1–0	(Iraq) Al-Quwa Al-Jawiya	Azadi Stadium, Tehran
21:30 UTC+3:30	Ahmadzadeh 4'	Report		Attendance: 10,450; Referee: Abdulrahman Al-Jassim (Qatar)

4 December 2023 6	Al-Ittihad (Saudi Arabia)	2–1	(Iran) Sepahan	Mecca, Saudi Arabia
21:00 UTC+3	Al-Amri 14'; Felipe (yellow card) 19'; Hamdallah (yellow card) 45'; Al-Ghamdi (yellow card) 68'; Jota 69'; Z. Hawsawi (yellow card) 90+2'	Report	Dabo (yellow card) 45+4'; Rezaeian 48'; Asadi (yellow card) 68'; Niazmand (yellow card) 88'	Stadium: King Abdul Aziz Stadium; Attendance: 11,159; Referee: Ma Ning (China)

==== Round of 16 ====
15 February 2024 First leg	Sepahan (Iran)	1–3	(Saudi Arabia) Al-Hilal	Isfahan, Iran
19:30 UTC+3:30	Karimi (yellow card) 29'; Rezaeian 37', (yellow card) 86'; Daneshgar (red card) 76'	Report	Malcom 57', (yellow card) 86'; Mitrović 90+4'; Al-Hamdan 90+7'	Stadium: Naghsh-e Jahan Stadium; Attendance: 61,265; Referee: Ahmad Al-Ali (Kuwait)

22 February 2024 Second leg	Al-Hilal (Saudi Arabia)	3–1 (6–2 agg.)	(Iran) Sepahan	Riyadh, Saudi Arabia
21:00 UTC+3	S. Al-Dawsari 76'; Neves 82'; Mitrović 90+7'	Report	Ahmadzadeh 54'; Yazdani (red card) 71'	Stadium: Kingdom Arena; Attendance: 18,055; Referee: Adel Al-Naqbi (United Arab Emirates)
