= Payam Parsa =

Iranian footballer

Personal information
- Date of birth: 22 July 2002 (age 24)
- Place of birth: Abadan, Iran
- Height: 1.83 m (6 ft 0 in)
- Position: Goalkeeper

Team information
- Current team: Mes Rafsanjan
- Number: 1

Youth career
- –2018: Sanat Naft

Senior career*
Years	Team	Apps	(Gls)
2018–2024	Sanat Naft	23	(0)
2024–	Mes Rafsanjan	2	(0)
- * Club domestic league appearances and goals as of 16 April 2025

Payam Parsa (Persian: پیام پارسا; born 22 July 2002) is an Iranian football goalkeeper who plays for Mes Rafsanjan in the Persian Gulf Pro League.

== Career statistics ==
=== Club ===
Club	Season	League			Cup		Continental		Total	
Club	Season	League	Apps	Goals	Apps	Goals	Apps	Goals	Apps	Goals
Sanat	2020-21	Persian Gulf Pro League	1	0	0	0	0	0	1	0
Sanat	2022-23	Persian Gulf Pro League	1	0	0	0	0	0	1	0
Sanat	2023-24	Persian Gulf Pro League	12	0	1	0	0	0	13	0
Total			14	0	1	0	0	0	15	0

== Club career ==
=== Sanat Naft ===
He made his debut for Sanat Naft in first fixtures of 2020–21 Persian Gulf Pro League against Paykan.
