= Jeferson Santos =

Jeferson Santos may refer to:

- Jeferson Bahia (born 1992), Brazilian footballer
- Jeferson Santos Junior (born 1999), Brazilian judoka
