= Esmaeil Gholizadeh =

Iranian football player

Esmail Gholizadeh
Personal information
- Date of birth: 18 February 2006 (age 20)
- Place of birth: Ardabil, Iran
- Height: 1.80 m (5 ft 11 in)
- Positions: Attacking midfielder; left winger

Team information
- Current team: Esteghlal
- Number: 87

Youth career
- 2020–2023: Sepahan

Senior career*
| Years | Team | Apps | (Gls) |
| 2023–2024 | Sepahan | 1 | (0) |
| 2024 | Shams Azar | 6 | (0) |
| 2025– | Esteghlal | 27 | (4) |

International career^{‡}
| 2022–2024 | Iran U17 | 20 | (9) |
| 2024–2025 | Iran U20 | 14 | (7) |
| 2025– | Iran U23 | 3 | (0) |
| 2026– | Iran | 1 | (0) |
- * Club domestic league appearances and goals as of 7 November 2026 ‡ National team caps and goals as of 14 November 2026

Esmaeil Gholizadeh (born 18 February 2006) is an Iranian football player who plays as an attacking midfielder for the Persian Gulf League team Esteghlal F.C. and the Iran national team.

== Career statistics ==
=== Club ===
As of 7 November 2026

| club | Season | League | | | Cup | | Continental | | Other | | Total | |
| club | Season | League | Apps | Goals | Apps | Goals | Apps | Goals | Apps | Goals | Apps | Goals |
|---|---|---|---|---|---|---|---|---|---|---|---|---|
| Sepahan | 2023–24 | Persian Gulf Pro League | 1 | 0 | 0 | 0 | 0 | 0 | - | - | 1 | 0 |
| Shams Azar | 2024–25 | Persian Gulf Pro League | 6 | 0 | 0 | 0 | - | - | - | - | 6 | 0 |
| Esteghlal | 2025–26 | Persian Gulf Pro League | 16 | 1 | 2 | 1 | 6 | 1 | 0 | 0 | 24 | 3 |
| Esteghlal | 2026–27 | Persian Gulf Pro League | 11 | 3 | 0 | 0 | 4 | 1 | - | - | 15 | 4 |
| Esteghlal | Total | | 27 | 4 | 2 | 1 | 10 | 2 | 0 | 0 | 39 | 7 |
| Total | | | 34 | 4 | 2 | 1 | 10 | 2 | 0 | 0 | 46 | 7 |

=== International ===
As of match played 14 November 2026

Appearances and goals by national team and year
| National team | Year | Apps | Goals |
|---|---|---|---|
Iran
| Iran | 2026 | 1 | 0 |
| Total | | 1 | 0 |
