= Sajjad Bazgir =

Iranian footballer

Personal information
- Date of birth: 28 February 1994 (age 32)
- Place of birth: Khorramabad, Iran
- Height: 1.76 m (5 ft 9 in)
- Position: Winger

Team information
- Current team: Mes Rafsanjan
- Number: 25

Youth career
- –2011: PAS Tehran
- 2011–2013: Damash Tehran
- 2014–2015: Naft Novin

Senior career*
Years	Team	Apps	(Gls)
2015–2016	Tehran Mobaddel		
2016–2018	Pardis		
2018	Zolfaghar Kashan		
2018–2020	Kheybar Khorramabad		
2020–2021	Esteghlal Mollasani	16	(1)
2021–2023	Malavan	71	(14)
2023–2024	Shams Azar	2	(0)
2024–2025	Malavan	14	(0)
2025–	Mes Rafsanjan	6	(0)
- * Club domestic league appearances and goals as of 1 May 2025

Sajjad Bazgir (Persian: سجاد بازگیر; born 28 February 1994) is an Iranian footballer who plays as a forward for Persian Gulf Pro League club Mes Rafsanjan.

== Club career ==
=== Esteghlal Mollasani ===
Bazgir joined Esteghlal Mollasani in October 2020. He made his debut on November 22, 2020, against Rayka Babol.

=== Malavan ===
On 3 April 2021, Bazgir signed for Malavan on a six-month contract until the end of the season. At the end of the season, he extended his contract for one season.
