= 2022–23 Persian Gulf Pro League =

22nd season of Persian Gulf Pro League

Persian Gulf Pro League
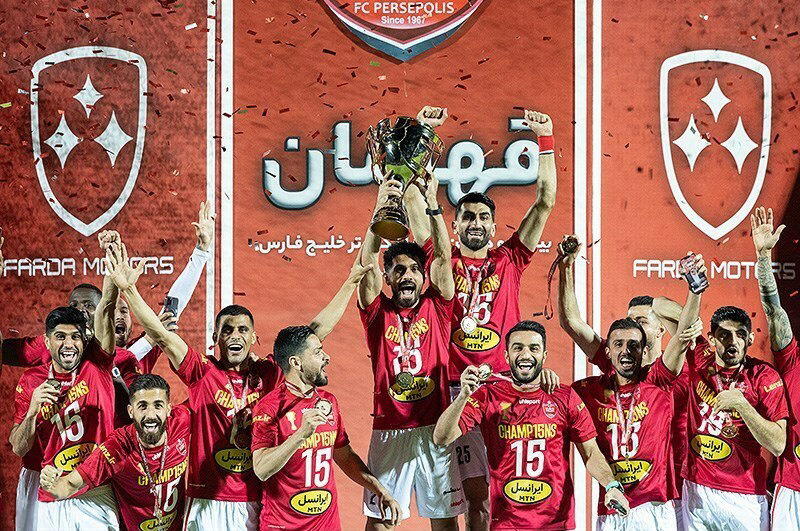
- Season: 2022–23
- Dates: October 2, 2022 — May 18, 2023
- Champions: Persepolis; 8th Pro League title 15th Iranian title
- Relegated: Naft MIS; Mes Kerman
- Champions League: Persepolis; Sepahan; Nassaji; Tractor
- Matches: 240
- Goals: 480 (2 per match)
- Top goalscorer: Shahriyar Moghanlou (13 Goals)
- Biggest home win: Esteghlal 7–1 Tractor (18 May 2023)
- Biggest away win: Naft Masjed soleyman 0–5 Gol Gohar (7 October 2022)
- Highest scoring: Esteghlal 7–1 Tractor (18 May 2023)
- Longest winning run: Persepolis (7 matches)
- Longest unbeaten run: Esteghlal (13 matches)
- Longest winless run: Naft Masjed Soleyman (20 matches)
- Longest losing run: Naft Masjed Soleyman (6 matches)
- Highest attendance: 70,000; Tractor – Sepahan (7 April 2023); Sepahan – Malavan (24 April 2023)
- Lowest attendance: 0 (spectator ban); 104 matches
- Total attendance: 1,294,100
- Average attendance: 9,515 (matches with spectator bans not included)
- All statistics correct as of 18 May 2023.

The 2022–23 Persian Gulf Pro League (formerly known as Iran Pro League) was the 40th season of Iran's Football League and 22nd as Persian Gulf Pro League since its establishment in 2001. The 2022–23 season started on 11 August 2022 and featured 14 teams from the 2021–22 Persian Gulf Pro League and two new teams promoted from the 2021–22 Azadegan League: Mes Kerman and Malavan. Shahriyar Moghanlou of Sepahan was the top scorer with 13 goals.

== Teams ==
=== Stadiums and locations ===
Locations of the 2023–24 Persian Gulf Pro League teams
Location of Tehran teams in 2023–24 Persian Gulf Pro League teams

Team	Location	Stadium	Capacity
Aluminium Arak	Arak	Imam Khomeini	15,000
Esteghlal	Tehran	Azadi	78,116
Foolad	Ahvaz	Foolad Arena	30,655
Gol Gohar Sirjan	Sirjan	Shahid Qasem Soleimani	9,000
Havadar	Karaj	Enghelab Stadium	8,250
Malavan	Bandar-e Anzali	Sirous Ghayeghran	9,000
Mes Kerman	Kerman	Shohadaye Mes Kerman	30,000
Mes Rafsanjan	Rafsanjan	Shohadaye Mes	3,800
Naft Masjed Soleyman	Masjed Soleyman	Behnam Mohammadi	8,000
Nassaji Mazandaran	Qaem Shahr	Vatani	15,000
Paykan	Karaj	Enghelab	18,000
Persepolis	Tehran	Azadi	78,116
Sanat Naft	Abadan	Takhti Abadan	10,000
Sepahan	Isfahan	Naghsh-e-Jahan	75,000
Tractor	Tabriz	Yadegar-e Emam	66,833
Zob Ahan	Fooladshahr	Fooladshahr	20,000

=== Number of teams by region ===
Region	Number of teams	Teams
Tehran	4	Esteghlal, Havadar, Paykan, Persepolis
Khuzestan	3	Foolad, Naft Masjed Soleyman, Sanat Naft
Kerman	3	Gol Gohar Sirjan, Mes Kerman, Mes Rafsanjan
Isfahan	2	Sepahan, Zob Ahan
East Azarbaijan	1	Tractor
Markazi	1	Aluminium Arak
Mazandaran	1	Nassaji
Gilan	1	Malavan

=== Personnel and kits ===
Note: Flags indicate national team as has been defined under FIFA eligibility rules. Players may hold more than one non-FIFA nationality.

Team	Manager	Captain	Kit manufacturer
Aluminium Arak	(Iran) Mehdi Rahmati	(Iran) Meysam Majidi	(Iran) Start
Esteghlal	(Portugal) Ricardo Sá Pinto	(Iran) Hossein Hosseini	(Iran) Yousef Jameh
Foolad	(Iran) Alireza Mansourian	(Iran) Ayoub Vali	(Iran) Merooj
Gol Gohar	(Iran) Saeid Alhoei	(Iran) Mehran Golzari	(Germany) Uhlsport
Havadar	(Iran) Saket Elhami	(Iran) Masoud Shojaei	(Iran) Yousef Jameh
Malavan	(Iran) Maziar Zare	(Iran) Sadegh Barani	(Iran) Start
Mes Kerman	(Iran) Farzad Hosseinkhani	(Iran) Arman Shahdadnejad	(Germany) Uhlsport
Mes Rafsanjan	(Iran) Mohammad Rabiei	(Iran) Mohsen Azarbad	(Iran) Yousef Jameh
Naft MIS	(Iran) Reza Enayati	(Iran) Meysam Naghizadeh	(Iran) Yousef Jameh
Nassaji	(Spain) Carlos Inarejos	(Iran) Hamed Shiri	(Germany) Uhlsport
Paykan	(Iran) Mojtaba Hosseini	(Iran) Ebrahim Salehi	(Iran) Merooj
Persepolis	(Iran) Yahya Golmohammadi	(Iran) Omid Alishah	(Germany) Uhlsport
Sanat Naft	(Iran) Abdollah Veisi	(Iran) Taleb Reykani	(Iran) Merooj
Sepahan	(Portugal) Jose Morais	(Iran) Jalaleddin Alimohammadi	(Iran) Merooj
Tractor	(Spain) Paco Jemez	(Iran) Mehdi Kiani	(Iran) Start
Zob Ahan	(Iran) Mehdi Tartar	(Iran) Masoud Ebrahimzadeh	(Iran) Start

=== Managerial changes ===
Team	Outgoing head coach	Manner of departure	Date of vacancy	Position in table	Incoming head coach	Date of appointment
Esteghlal	(Iran) Farhad Majidi	Resigned	3 June 2022	Pre-season	(Portugal) Ricardo Sá Pinto	21 June 2022
Havadar	(Iran) Reza Enayati	Resigned	4 June 2022	Pre-season	(Iran) Saket Elhami	22 June 2022
Sepahan	(Iran) Moharram Navidkia	Resigned	8 June 2022	Pre-season	(Portugal) José Morais	23 June 2022
Tractor	(Turkey) Ertuğrul Sağlam	Mutual Consent	15 June 2022	Pre-season	(Turkmenistan) Kurban Berdyev	16 June 2022
Nassaji Mazandaran	(Iran) Esmaeil Esmaeili	End of caretaker role	20 June 2022	Pre-season	(Iran) Hamid Motahari	20 June 2022
Sanat Naft	(Iran) Alireza Mansourian	Resigned	24 June 2022	Pre-season	(Germany) (Iran) Reza Parkas	1 July 2022
Sanat Naft	(Germany) (Iran) Reza Parkas	Sacked	14 September 2022	15th	(Iran) Firouz Karimi	28 September 2022
Sanat Naft	(Iran) Firouz Karimi	Sacked	10 November 2022	16th	(Brazil) Edson Tavares	13 November 2022
Tractor	(Turkmenistan) Kurban Berdyev	Signed by (Russia) Sochi	27 November 2022	7th	(Spain) Paco Jemez	6 December 2022
Naft MIS	(Iran) Reza Mohajeri	Resigned	21 December 2022	16th	(Iran) Ebrahim Ashkesh	21 December 2022
Naft MIS	(Iran) Ebrahim Ashkesh	Sacked	23 January 2022	16th	(Iran) Reza Enayati	23 January 2023
Foolad	(Iran) Javad Nekounam	Resigned	22 February 2023	9th	(Iran) Alireza Mansourian	28 February 2023
Sanat Naft	(Brazil) Edson Tavares	Sacked	9 March 2023	15th	(Iran) Abdollah Veisi	9 March 2023
Gol Gohar	(Iran) Amir Ghalenoei	Signed by Iran	18 March 2023	4th	(Iran) Saeid Alhoei	18 March 2023
Nassaji Mazandaran	(Iran) Hamid Motahari	Mutual Consent	8 April 2023	13th	(Spain) Carlos Inarejos	9 April 2023

== Foreign Players ==
The number of foreign players is restricted to four per Persian Gulf Pro League team, including a slot for a player from AFC countries. A team can use four foreign players on the field in each game, including at least one player from the AFC country.
In bold: Players that have been capped for their national team.

Club	Player 1	Player 2	Player 3	Asian Player	Former Player
Aluminium Arak	(Colombia) Hansel Zapata			(South Sudan) **Valentino Yuel** (Note: Yuel is a South Sudan international but since he has Australian citizenship counts as an Asian Player.)	
Esteghlal	(Brazil) Raphael Silva	(France) Arthur Yamga			(Uzbekistan) **Azizbek Amonov**
Foolad	(Austria) Christopher Knett	(Spain) Roberto Torres	(Spain) Álex Alegría	(Japan) Yukiya Sugita	(South Africa) **Ayanda Patosi** (Mali) Moussa Coulibaly
Gol Gohar	(Brazil) Kiros Stanlley	(Brazil) Wescley	(Gabon) Eric Bocoum		
Havadar					
Malavan					
Mes Kerman	(Guinea-Bissau) Bura Nogueira			(Australia) **Ruon Tongyik**	
Mes Rafsanjan	(Brazil) Chimba	(Brazil) Jeferson Bahia	(Nigeria) Godwin Mensha		
Naft MIS					
Nassaji	(Mali) **Adama Niane**				
Paykan	(South Sudan) **Tito Okello**			(Uzbekistan) **Sherzod Temirov**	
Persepolis	(Brazil) Leandro Pereira	(Georgia (country)) **Giorgi Gvelesiani**	(Mali) **Cheick Diabaté**	(Tajikistan) **Vahdat Hanonov**	(Uzbekistan) **Sherzod Temirov** (Netherlands) Jürgen Locadia
Sanat Naft	(Iraq) **Mohammed Ridha Jalil**	(Uruguay) Sebastián Píriz	(Uzbekistan) **Sharof Mukhiddinov**	(Tajikistan) **Sheriddin Boboyev**	
Sepahan	(Brazil) Nilson Júnior	(Brazil) Ygor Catatau	(Portugal) **Manuel Fernandes**	(Burundi) **Elvis Kamsoba** (Note: Kamsoba is a Burundi international but since he has Australian citizenship counts as an Asian Player.)	(Brazil) Renato Silviera
Tractor	(Brazil) Gustavo Vagenin	(Portugal) Ricardo Alves	(Spain) Jaime Romero	(Iraq) **Safaa Hadi**	
Zob Ahan					(Serbia) Darko Bjedov (Tajikistan) **Ehson Panjshanbe**

== League table ==
=== Standings ===
Pos	Team	Pld	W	D	L	GF	GA	GD	Pts	Qualification or relegation
1	Persepolis (C)	30	20	6	4	46	13	+33	66	Qualification for 2023–24 AFC Champions League group stage
2	Sepahan	30	19	8	3	49	17	+32	65	Qualification for 2023–24 AFC Champions League group stage
3	Esteghlal (Note: Esteghlal did not pay its debts on time and did not obtain an AFC license. They were therefore unable to participate in AFC competitions.)	30	18	8	4	52	22	+30	62	
4	Tractor	30	15	7	8	42	34	+8	52	Qualification for 2023–24 AFC Champions League qualifying play-offs
5	Mes Rafsanjan	30	11	14	5	30	15	+15	47	
6	Gol Gohar	30	12	9	9	40	36	+4	45	
7	Aluminium Arak	30	8	16	6	20	15	+5	40 (Note: Aluminium is above Foolad based on Total goal difference, as the teams played two draws during the season.)	
8	Foolad	30	9	13	8	27	26	+1	40	
9	Zob Ahan	30	7	15	8	25	24	+1	36	
10	Havadar	30	7	12	11	24	34	−10	33	
11	Paykan	30	5	13	12	12	28	−16	28	
12	Malavan	30	5	12	13	21	40	−19	27	
13	Nassaji Mazandaran	30	5	11	14	26	44	−18	26	Qualification for 2023–24 AFC Champions League group stage (Note: Qualified to AFC Champions League group stage by winning the 2021–22 Hazfi Cup.)
14	Sanat Naft	30	5	10	15	22	36	−14	25	
15	Mes Kerman (R)	30	4	10	16	22	37	−15	22	Relegation to 2023–24 Azadegan League
16	Naft Masjed Soleyman (R)	30	4	8	18	22	59	−37	20	Relegation to 2023–24 Azadegan League

Source: Iran Football League Organization - League Full Table, Iplstats
Rules for classification: 1) Points; 2) Head-to-head points; 3) Head-to-head goal difference; 4) Total goal difference; 5) Total goals scored; 6) Play-off at neutral venue.

== Results ==
Home \ Away	ALU	EST	FOL	GOL	HAV	MLV	SMK	MES	MIS	NSJ	PAY	PRS	SNA	SEP	TRC	ZOB
Aluminium Arak	—	0–1	0–1	0–0	0–1	1–0	2–0	2–1	0–0	3–0	0–0	0–1	3–1	1–1	0–2	0–0
Esteghlal	0–0	—	1–1	2–1	6–1	4–0	1–0	0–0	3–1	3–1	0–0	2–2	1–1	0–2	7–1	2–0
Foolad	2–2	0–2	—	1–2	0–0	1–0	0–0	0–0	1–0	2–0	1–1	1–0	0–0	0–1	3–2	1–1
Gol Gohar	0–1	1–2	2–2	—	2–1	1–0	1–1	2–2	4–0	0–1	2–1	0–2	0–1	2–2	2–1	1–0
Havadar	1–1	0–1	0–0	1–1	—	1–0	1–1	0–1	1–1	1–1	0–1	1–3	0–1	1–2	0–1	1–0
Malavan	1–1	1–3	3–1	1–2	1–2	—	0–0	0–4	1–0	1–0	1–0	0–1	2–1	0–0	1–1	1–1
Mes Kerman	1–1	2–3	1–1	2–2	0–1	0–0	—	0–2	2–0	2–1	3–0	1–3	2–0	1–2	1–3	0–0
Mes Rafsanjan	0–0	1–2	2–0	0–0	2–1	0–0	1–0	—	1–0	1–1	2–0	0–1	4–0	0–0	1–0	0–0
Naft MIS	0–1	0–0	1–4	0–5	0–0	5–1	3–2	0–0	—	2–2	1–2	1–2	0–0	0–2	1–5	1–0
Nassaji	0–0	1–1	2–1	1–2	1–1	2–2	2–0	1–1	4–0	—	1–1	0–4	0–2	0–1	2–0	0–0
Paykan	0–0	0–2	0–2	0–1	1–1	1–0	1–0	1–1	0–0	0–0	—	0–1	0–0	1–0	0–1	0–0
Persepolis	0–0	1–0	0–0	4–0	0–1	3–0	1–0	1–0	3–0	5–1	0–0	—	2–0	0–1	0–1	1–0
Sanat Naft	0–1	0–1	0–0	0–1	0–1	1–1	2–1	1–1	1–2	4–0	1–1	1–2	—	0–2	1–3	1–1
Sepahan	0–0	2–1	0–1	4–1	3–1	1–1	2–0	2–0	4–0	2–1	5–0	0–0	1–0	—	4–2	2–1
Tractor	0–0	2–0	1–0	2–2	0–0	1–1	0–0	0–1	3–2	1–0	1–0	2–3	1–0	1–0	—	1–1
Zob Ahan	1–0	0–1	2–0	1–0	3–3	1–1	1–0	0–0	5–1	1–0	1–0	0–0	2–2	1–1	1–3	—

Updated to match(es) played on 18 May 2023. Source: IPL Stats, Soccerway
Legend: Blue = home team win; Yellow = draw; Red = away team win.
For upcoming matches, an "a" indicates there is an article about the rivalry between the two participants.

=== Positions by round ===
The table lists the positions of teams after each week of matches. In order to preserve chronological evolvements, any postponed matches are not included to the round at which they were originally scheduled, but added to the full round they were played immediately afterwards.

Team ╲ Round	1	2	3	4	5	6	7	8	9	10	11	12	13	14	15	16	17	18	19	20	21	22	23	24	25	26	27	28	29	30
Aluminium Arak	14	7	13	12	15	15	10	10	9	8	5	8	8	5	8	7	7	7	6	6	7	7	7	7	8	8	8	7	7	7
Esteghlal	16	6	2	4	6	3	2	3	2	3	2	3	2	2	4	4	4	3	3	3	3	3	2	2	2	1	3	3	3	3
Foolad	9	11	5	2	3	5	6	7	8	9	10	10	10	10	7	7	8	8	8	9	8	8	9	8	7	7	7	8	8	8
Gol Gohar	3	3	4	6	2	2	4	1	4	4	3	2	3	3	2	3	3	4	5	4	4	4	4	4	4	4	5	6	6	6
Havadar	4	4	8	8	12	14	15	13	10	10	11	11	11	12	11	12	10	9	9	8	9	9	10	9	10	10	10	10	10	10
Malavan	15	16	16	16	16	13	14	12	13	15	14	13	13	13	13	11	13	11	11	11	12	12	11	11	12	12	12	13	11	12
Mes Kerman	12	5	10	9	13	12	13	15	15	13	13	14	14	14	14	14	14	14	14	14	14	14	14	14	14	14	14	14	14	15
Mes Rafsanjan	6	10	12	11	11	7	8	5	7	7	8	6	6	7	5	5	6	6	7	7	6	6	5	6	6	6	6	5	5	5
Naft MIS	2	2	7	7	5	8	12	14	14	14	15	16	16	16	16	16	16	15	15	15	15	15	15	15	16	16	16	16	16	16
Nassaji	7	13	14	14	8	11	7	8	6	5	6	9	9	6	9	8	9	10	10	10	11	11	12	12	13	13	13	12	13	13
Paykan	5	8	3	5	7	9	11	11	12	11	12	12	12	11	12	13	11	12	12	12	13	13	13	13	11	11	11	11	12	11
Persepolis	10	12	6	1	1	1	1	2	1	1	1	1	1	1	1	1	1	2	2	2	2	2	3	3	3	3	1	1	1	1
Sanat Naft	11	15	9	13	14	16	16	16	16	16	16	15	15	15	15	15	15	16	16	16	16	16	16	16	15	15	15	15	15	14
Sepahan	1	1	1	3	4	4	3	4	3	2	4	4	4	4	3	2	2	1	1	1	1	1	1	1	1	2	2	2	2	2
Tractor	13	14	15	15	9	6	5	6	5	6	7	5	5	8	6	6	5	5	4	5	5	5	6	5	5	5	4	4	4	4
Zob Ahan	8	9	11	10	10	10	9	9	11	12	9	7	7	9	10	10	12	13	13	13	10	10	8	10	9	9	9	9	9	9

Leader : 2023–24 AFC Champions League Group stage
AFC Champions League group stage
Relegation to 2023-24 Azadegan League

Updated to match(es) played on 18 May 2023. Source: Iran Football League Organization

==== First Placed team ====
#	Team	Top of Table(weeks)
1	Persepolis	17
2	Sepahan	11
3	Gol Gohar	1
4	Esteghlal	1

== Season statistics ==
=== Top scorers ===
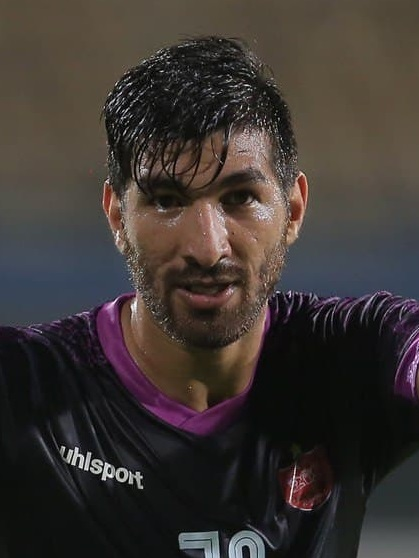
Shahriyar Moghanlou scored 13 goals in the Persian Gulf Pro League Season.

Rank	Player	Club	Goals
1	(Iran) Shahriyar Moghanlou	Sepahan	13
2	(Iran) Mehdi Ghayedi	Esteghlal	12
3	(Iran) Reza Asadi	Tractor	11
4	(Iran) Mohammad Abbaszadeh	Tractor	10
5	(Iran) Mohammad Mohebi	Esteghlal	8
5	(Iran) Aref Rostami	Mes Kerman	8
7	(Iran) Mohammad Reza Azadi	Aluminium Arak	7
7	(Iran) Sajjad Bazgir	Malavan	7
7	(Iran) Omid Noorafkan	Sepahan	7
7	(Iran) Ramin Rezaeian	Sepahan	7
7	(Iran) Reza Shekari	Gol Gohar	7
7	(Iran) Hamed Shiri	Nassaji	7
7	(Iran) Mehdi Torabi	Persepolis	7
7	(France) Arthur Yamga	Esteghlal	7
15	(Netherlands) Jürgen Locadia	Persepolis	6
15	(Iran) Saeid Sadeghi	Persepolis	6
15	(Georgia (country)) Giorgi Gvelesiani	Persepolis	6

==== Hat-tricks ====
Player	For	Against	Result	Date
(Iran) Mohammad Abbaszadeh	Tractor	Naft MIS	3–2 (H)	14 October 2022
(Iran) Reza Asadi	Tractor	Zob Ahan	3–1 (A)	27 January 2023
(Iran) Taleb Reykani	Sanat Naft	Nassaji	4–0 (H)	23 April 2023
(Iran) Mehdi Torabi	Persepolis	Gol Gohar	4–0 (H)	12 May 2023
(Iran) Mehdi Ghayedi	Esteghlal	Tractor	7–1 (H)	18 May 2023
(Iran) Saeid Saharkhizan	Havadar	Zob Ahan	3–3 (A)	18 May 2023

=== Clean sheets ===
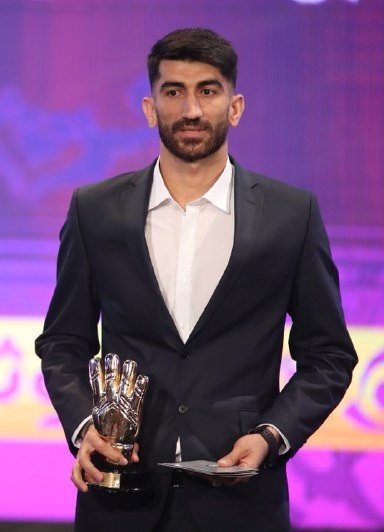
Alireza Beiranvand won his fourth Persian Gulf Pro League Golden Glove after keeping 18 clean sheets for Persepolis.

Rank	Player	Club	Clean sheets
1	(Iran) Alireza Beiranvand	Persepolis	18
2	(Iran) Hossein Pourhamidi	Aluminum Arak	17
3	(Austria) Christopher Knett	Foolad	14
4	(Iran) Mohammad Reza Akhbari	Tractor	13
4	(Iran) Hamed Lak	Mes Rafsanjan	13
4	(Iran) Payam Niazmand	Sepahan	13
7	(Iran) Hossein Hosseini	Esteghlal	12
8	(Iran) Habib Far Abbasi	Zob Ahan	11
9	(Iran) Mohammad Rashid Mazaheri	Sepahan Paykan	7

== Awards ==
=== Metrica Weekly awards ===
Weeks	Team of the Week		Player of the Week		References
Weeks	Club	Point	Player	Point	References
Week 1	Sepahan	7.7	(Iran) Amir Hossein Karimi _{(MIS)}	8.30	
Week 2	Esteghlal	7.8	(Iran) Mehdi Ghayedi _{(EST)}	7.91	
Week 3	Paykan	7.4	(Iran) Majid Aliyari _{(FOL)}	8.10	
Week 4	Foolad	7.6	(Iran) Aref Rostami _{(SMK)}	7.91	
Week 5	Persepolis	7.6	(Iran) Saeid Sadeghi _{(PRS)}	8.94	
Week 6	Esteghlal	7.9	(Netherlands) Jürgen Locadia _{(PRS)}	8.75	

== Attendances ==
=== Average home attendances ===
Pos	Team	Total	High	Low	Average	Change
1	Tractor	267,000	70,000	0	33,375	−3.7%
2	Sepahan	256,000	70,000	0	25,600	+28.0%
3	Persepolis	218,000	50,000	0	23,111	+110.1%
4	Esteghlal	143,500	35,000	0	14,350	−61.6%
5	Nassaji	85,800	15,000	0	8,580	+1,330.0%
6	Foolad	68,000	30,000	0	8,500	+41.7%
7	Sanat Mes Kerman	53,000	15,000	0	5,889	n/a
8	Malavan	43,000	10,000	0	5,375	n/a
9	Naft MIS	33,000	10,000	0	4,125	+50.0%
10	Sanat Naft	32,000	10,000	0	4,000	+33.3%
11	Aluminium Arak	31,300	15,000	0	3,478	+15.9%
12	Paykan	16,900	15,000	0	3,380	+3,280.0%
13	Gol Gohar	30,000	8,000	0	3,333	+11.1%
14	Mes Rafsanjan	18,300	3,800	0	1,830	+155.2%
15	Zob Ahan	7,200	3,000	0	800	−55.6%
16	Havadar	1,100	500	0	157	+4.7%
	League total	1,294,100	40,000	0	9,515	n/a

Updated to games played on 18 May 2023
Source: Iranleague.ir
Notes:
Matches with spectator bans are not included in average attendances
Malavan and Sanat Mes Kerman played in the previous season in the Azadegan League

=== Attendances by round ===
Team/Round	1	2	3	4	5	6	7	8	9	10	11	12	13	14	15	16	17	18	19	20	21	22	23	24	25	26	27	28	29	30	Average
Aluminium Arak	NC	A	500	A	5,000	A	NC	A	NC	A	NC	A	N/A	A	NC	A	1,000	A	2,000	A	5,000	A	300	A	15,000	A	2,000	A	500	A	3,478
Esteghlal	NC	A	35,000	A	20,000	20,000	A	NC	A	NC	A	NC	A	NC	A	A	1,500	A	2,000	A	A	10,000	A	15,000	A	10,000	A	15,000	A	15,000	14,350
Foolad	NC	A	7,000	A	5,000	A	NC	A	NC	A	NC	A	NC	NC	A	A	NC	A	9,000	A	5,000	A	30,000	A	5,000	A	5,000	A	A	2,000	8,500
Gol Gohar	NC	A	8,000	A	6,000	A	NC	A	NC	NC	A	NC	A	NC	A	A	2,000	A	2,000	A	2,000	A	2,000	A	A	5,000	A	1,000	A	2,000	3,333
Havadar	A	100	100	A	NC	A	NC	A	NC	A	NC	A	NC	A	NC	NC	A	A	NC	A	100	A	100	A	100	A	100	A	500	A	157
Malavan	A	NC	A	6,000	A	NC	A	NC	A	NC	A	NC	A	A	NC	NC	A	3,000	A	3,000	A	3,000	A	4,000	A	10,000	A	7,000	7,000	A	5,375
Mes Rafsanjan	A	1,500	A	2,000	A	2,000	A	NC	A	A	NC	A	NC	A	NC	700	A	1,000	A	1,000	A	500	A	3,800	1,000	A	1,000	A	3,800	A	1,830
Naft MIS	NC	A	3,000	10,000	A	8,000	A	NC	A	NC	A	NC	A	NC	A	A	3,000	A	A	2,000	A	2,000	A	NC	A	NC	A	4,000	A	1,000	4,125
Nassaji	NC	A	15,000	A	10,000	A	NC	NC	A	NC	A	800	A	NC	A	A	5,000	A	1,000	A	15,000	A	A	3,000	A	11,000	A	10,000	A	15,000	8,580
Paykan	NC	A	A	NC	A	NC	A	NC	A	NC	A	NC	A	NC	A	A	NC	NC	A	NC	A	100	A	1,000	A	500	A	15,000	A	300	3,380
Persepolis	A	40,000	A	30,000	A	A	NC	A	NC	A	NC	A	NC	A	NC	NC	A	5,000	A	5,000	8,000	A	20,000	A	10,000	A	40,000	A	50,000	A	23,111
Sanat Mes Kerman	A	NC	A	10,000	A	6,000	A	NC	A	NC	A	NC	A	NC	A	NC	A	5,000	A	2,000	A	2,000	A	3,000	A	15,000	A	5,000	A	5,000	5,889
Sanat Naft	A	NC	A	A	3,000	A	NC	A	NC	A	NC	A	NC	A	NC	NC	A	3,000	2,000	A	3,000	A	3,000	A	3,000	A	5,000	A	10,000	A	4,000
Sepahan	A	13,000	A	12,000	A	4,000	A	NC	A	NC	A	A	NC	A	NC	NC	A	15,000	A	10,000	A	6,000	A	11,000	A	60,000	70,000	A	55,000	A	25,600
Tractor	A	NC	A	30,000	A	35,000	A	A	NC	A	NC	A	NC	A	NC	NC	A	25,000	A	20,000	A	NC	2,000	A	70,000	A	35,000	A	50,000	A	33,375
Zob Ahan	NC	A	1,000	A	3,000	A	NC	A	NC	A	NC	NC	A	NC	A	A	700	A	1,000	A	200	A	400	A	200	A	A	500	A	200	800
Total	0	54,600	69,600	100,000	52,000	75,000	0	0	0	0	0	800	0	0	0	700	13,200	57,000	19,000	43,000	38,300	23,600	57,800	40,800	104,300	111,500	158,100	57,500	176,800	40,500	1,294,100
Average	0	13,650	8,700	14,256	7,429	12,500	0	0	0	0	0	800	0	0	0	700	2,200	8,143	2,714	6,149	4,788	3,371	7,225	5,829	13,038	15,926	19,763	7,188	22,100	5,063	9,515

Notes:
Updated to games played on 18 May 2023. Source: Iranleague.ir
Matches with spectator bans are not included in average attendances

=== Highest attendances ===
Rank	Home team	Score	Away team	Attendance	Date	Week	Stadium
1	Tractor	1–0	Sepahan	70,000	7 April 2023	25	Sahand
1	Sepahan	1–1	Malavan	70,000	24 April 2023	27	Naghsh-e Jahan
3	Sepahan	2–0	Mes Rasfanjan	60,000	15 April 2023	26	Naghsh-e Jahan
4	Sepahan	5–0	Paykan	55,000	12 May 2023	29	Naghsh-e Jahan
5	Persepolis	4–0	Gol Gohar	50,000	12 May 2023	29	Azadi
5	Tractor	1–0	Nassaji	50,000	12 May 2023	29	Sahand
7	Persepolis	0–0	Foolad	40,000	19 August 2022	2	Azadi
7	Persepolis	1–0	Esteghlal	40,000	23 April 2023	27	Azadi
9	Esteghlal	1–0	Sanat Mes Kerman	35,000	25 August 2022	3	Azadi
9	Tractor	1–0	Sanat Naft	35,000	10 September 2022	6	Sahand

Notes:
Updated to games played on 18 May 2023. Source: Iranleague.ir

== See also ==
- 2022–23 Azadegan League
- 2022–23 2nd Division
- 2022–23 3rd Division
- 2022–23 Hazfi Cup
- 2022 Iranian Super Cup
- 2023–24 AFC Champions League
