= Nima Mirzazad =

Iranian professional football player (born 1997)

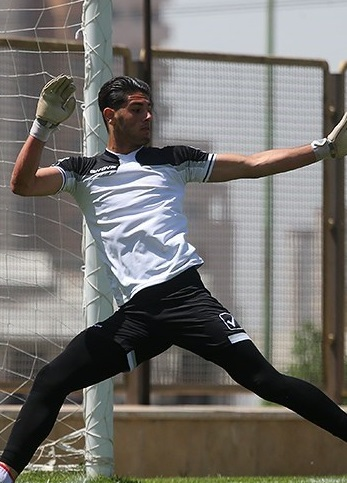

Personal information
- Date of birth: 27 February 1997 (age 29)
- Place of birth: Bandar-e Anzali, Iran
- Height: 1.97 m (6 ft 6 in)
- Position: Goalkeeper

Team information
- Current team: Kolding

Youth career
- Malavan

Senior career*
Years	Team	Apps	(Gls)
2014–2018	Malavan	48	(0)
2018–2021	Nassaji	23	(0)
2021–2026	Sepahan	14	(0)
2022	→ Sanat Naft Abadan (loan)	1	(0)
2025–2026	→ Mes Rafsanjan (loan)	19	(0)
2026–	Kolding	0	(0)

International career
2014–2017	Iran U20	2	(0)
2018–2020	Iran U23	1	(0)
Medal record
Representing Iran
CAFA Nations Cup
Runner-up	2025 Tajikistan–Uzbekistan	Team
- * Club domestic league appearances and goals

Nima Mirzazad (born 27 February 1997) is an Iranian professional football player currently playing for Kolding in the Danish 1st Division.

== Club career ==
=== Malavan ===
Mirzazad joined Malavan's senior team before the start of the 2014–15 season at the age of 17. Nima Mirzazad made his debut in Persian Gulf Pro League on 8 May 2016, against Saba Qom as Malavan's first goalkeeper, Hossein Hosseini, was injured. Nima was 19 years and 2 months and 10 days old on this day.

=== Statistics ===
As of 1 May 2017

Club	Division	Season	League		Hazfi Cup		Asia		Total	
Club	Division	Season	Apps	Goals	Apps	Goals	Apps	Goals	Apps	Goals
Malavan	PGPL	2014–15	0	0	0	0	–	–	0	0
Malavan	PGPL	2015–16	2	0	0	0	–	–	2	0
Malavan	Azadegan League	2016–17	8	0	0	0	–	–	8	0
Malavan	Azadegan League	2017–18	7	0	0	0	–	–	7	0
Malavan	Total		17	0	0	0	-	-	17	0
F.C. Nassaji Mazandaran	Persian Gulf Pro League	2018-2019	0	0	0	0	0	0	0	0
F.C. Nassaji Mazandaran	Persian Gulf Pro League	2019-20	5	0	1	0	0	0	6	0
F.C. Nassaji Mazandaran	Persian Gulf Pro League	2020-21	18	0	1	0	0	0	19	0
F.C. Nassaji Mazandaran	Total		23	0	2	0	0	0	25	0
Sepahan	Persian Gulf Pro League	2021-22	1	0	0	0	0	0	1	0
Sepahan	Persian Gulf Pro League	2022-23	1	0	1	0	0	0	2	0
Sepahan	Persian Gulf Pro League	2023-24	1	0	0	0	0	0	1	0
Sepahan	Total		3	0	1	0	0	0	4	0
Career Total			43	0	3	0	–	–	46	!0

== International ==
Nima was invited Iran U19 team at the age of 17. He was invited to the senior national team camp by manager Carlos Queiroz at the age of 19.

== Honours ==
Sepahan

- Iranian Hazfi Cup: 2023–24
