= Jeferson Bahia =

Brazilian footballer (born 1992)

Personal information
- Full name: Jeferson Silva dos Santos
- Date of birth: 28 May 1992 (age 34)
- Place of birth: Salvador, Brazil
- Height: 1.93 m (6 ft 4 in)
- Position: Centre-back

Team information
- Current team: Newroz SC
- Number: 28

Youth career
- 2009: Portuguesa

Senior career*
Years	Team	Apps	(Gls)
2010–2012	Palmeiras B		
2012	→ Pirassununguense (loan)	5	(1)
2012	Vitória das Tabocas		
2013	Castelo		
2013	Sertãozinho		
2014	Vitória das Tabocas		
2014	Barbalha		
2014	Real Noroeste	3	(0)
2015	Destroyers		
2016	Desportiva Ferroviária		
2016	Goytacaz	13	(0)
2016–2019	Varzim	62	(2)
2019	Penafiel	7	(0)
2020–2022	Portimonense	1	(0)
2020–2021	→ Londrina (loan)	23	(1)
2021	→ Paraná (loan)	9	(1)
2021	→ Amora (loan)	8	(0)
2022	→ Água Santa (loan)	11	(0)
2022	→ Brusque (loan)	9	(0)
2022–2023	Mes Rafsanjan	30	(2)
2023–2024	Foolad	26	(0)
2024–2025	Al-Karma	37	(1)
2026–	Newroz SC	7	(0)
- * Club domestic league appearances and goals as of 19:39, 8 February 2026 (UTC)

Jeferson Silva dos Santos (born 28 May 1992), commonly known as Jeferson Bahia, is a Brazilian professional footballer who plays as a centre-back for Iraq Stars League club Newroz SC.

== Career ==
Jeferson Bahia made his professional debut in the Segunda Liga for Varzim on 6 August 2016 in a game against Gil Vicente.

In January 2026, Bahia joined Iraq Stars League club Newroz SC.
