= Mohammad Alinejad =

Iranian football forward

Mohammad Alinezhaad
Personal information
- Full name: Mohammad Alinezhaad
- Date of birth: 3 July 1993 (age 33)
- Place of birth: Gorgan, Iran
- Height: 1.78 m (5 ft 10 in)
- Position: Winger

Team information
- Current team: Gol Gohar
- Number: 13

Youth career
- 2001–2011: Esteghlal Gorgan
- 2011–2012: Esteghlal
- 2012–2014: Malavan

Senior career*
Years	Team	Apps	(Gls)
2014–2015	Etka Gorgan	7	(0)
2015	Pars Jonoubi Jam		
2015–2016	Saipa	6	(1)
2016–2017	Nassaji Mazandaran	7	(0)
2017	Haf Semnan		
2017–2018	Naft Masjed Soleyman	24	(1)
2019–2022	Aluminium Arak	39	(0)
2022–2024	Sepahan	25	(2)
2023–2024	→ Foolad (loan)	27	(1)
2024–2025	Mes Rafsanjan	27	(1)
2025–2026	Malavan	20	(3)
2026–	Gol Gohar	7	(1)
- * Club domestic league appearances and goals as of 8 July 2020

Mohammad Alinezhaad (Persian: محمد علینژاد) is an Iranian footballer who plays as a winger for Iranian football club Gol Gohar.

== Career statistics ==
=== Club ===
Club	Season	League			Cup		Continental		Total	
Club	Season	League	Apps	Goals	Apps	Goals	Apps	Goals	Apps	Goals
Etka	2014-15	Azadegan League	3	0	0	0	0	0	3	0
Saipa	2015-16	Persian Gulf Pro League	7	1	2	0	0	0	9	1
Nassaji	2016-17	Azadegan League	7	0	1	0	0	0	8	0
Naft MIS	2017-18	Azadegan League	24	1	2	0	0	0	26	1
Aluminium	2019-20	Azadegan League	24	2	0	0	0	0	24	2
Mes	2020-21	Azadegan League	13	3	1	0	0	0	14	3
Aluminium	2020-21	Persian Gulf Pro League	10	0	0	0	0	0	10	0
Aluminium	2021-22	Persian Gulf Pro League	29	0	4	1	0	0	33	1
Aluminium	Total		39	0	4	1	0	0	43	1
Sepahan	2022-23	Persian Gulf Pro League	25	2	2	0	0	0	27	2
Foolad	2023-24	Persian Gulf Pro League	19	0	1	0	0	0	20	0
Career Total			161	9	13	1	0	0	174	10

== Club career ==
Alinejad started his youth career with his hometown club, Esteghlal Gorgan. He later joined the Esteghlal and Malavan academies. Alinejad began his senior career with Etka Gorgan in the summer of 2014 and made seven appearances for the club in the Azadegan League. After Etka Gorgan resigned from the Azadegan League in the winter of 2015, Alinejad moved to League 2 side Pars Jonoubi Jam. He moved on to Saipa in the summer of 2015 and made his professional debut against Persepolis on 16 September as a substitute for Reza Norouzi.
