= Ramin Rezaeian =

Iranian footballer (born 1990)

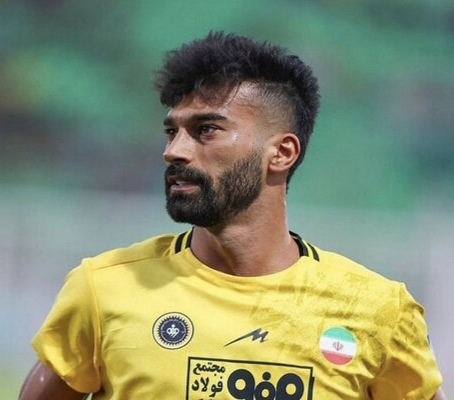
- Rezaeian in 2024

Personal information
- Full name: Ramin Rezaeian Salehrad
- Date of birth: 21 March 1990 (age 36)
- Place of birth: Sari, Mazandaran, Iran
- Height: 1.84 m (6 ft 0 in)
- Positions: Right back; winger

Team information
- Current team: Foolad
- Number: 69

Youth career
- 2002–2008: Shahrdari Sari
- 2008–2009: Shensa-ye Tehran

Senior career*
Years	Team	Apps	(Gls)
2009–2013	Saba Qom	98	(7)
2013–2015	Rah Ahan	54	(11)
2015–2017	Persepolis	40	(9)
2017–2018	KV Oostende	16	(1)
2018–2020	Al Shahania	32	(16)
2020–2022	Al-Duhail	10	(2)
2021–2022	→ Al-Sailiya (loan)	24	(5)
2022	Persepolis	13	(0)
2022–2024	Sepahan	56	(15)
2024–2026	Esteghlal	35	(11)
2026	→ Foolad (loan)	6	(1)
2026–	Foolad	4	(0)

International career^{‡}
2015–	Iran	79	(10)
Medal record
Representing Iran
CAFA Nations Cup
Winner	2023 Kyrgyzstan – Uzbekistan	Team
Runner-up	2025 Tajikistan–Uzbekistan	Team
- * Club domestic league appearances and goals as of 24 September 2026 ‡ National team caps and goals as of 29 September 2026

Ramin Rezaeian Salehrad Semeskandi (Note: Persian: رامین رضائیان سمسکندی) (born 21 March 1990) is an Iranian professional footballer who plays as a right back for Foolad Club in the Persian Gulf Pro League and Iran national team. He is Iran's highest ever goalscorer in the FIFA World Cup with three goals.

He started his career as a right-back, but he often plays as a winger. Rezaeian was Carlos Queiroz's first choice on the right side of the defence of the Iran men's national team in the 2018 FIFA World Cup qualification matches. Known for his great speed, agility, and athleticism, he is often regarded as one of Iran's best ever fullbacks.

== Early life ==
Ramin Rezaeian was born on 21 March 1990 in Samaskandah, a village in Sari County, Mazanderan Province.

== Club career ==
=== Saba Qom ===
Rezaeian played his entire career for Saba Qom before signing for Rah Ahan in 2013. He made 98 appearances for the club scoring seven goals.

=== Rah Ahan ===
Rezaeian signed a three–year with the Tehran-based club Rah Ahan in 2013. After several good performances in the 2014–15 season, Rezaeian was recognized as one of the best fullbacks in the league and was called up to the national team. On 3 April 2015, Rezaeian scored his team's first goal in a 2–2 draw against Persepolis. Two weeks later, on 17 April, he scored a brace in a 2–2 draw against Esteghlal Khuzestan.

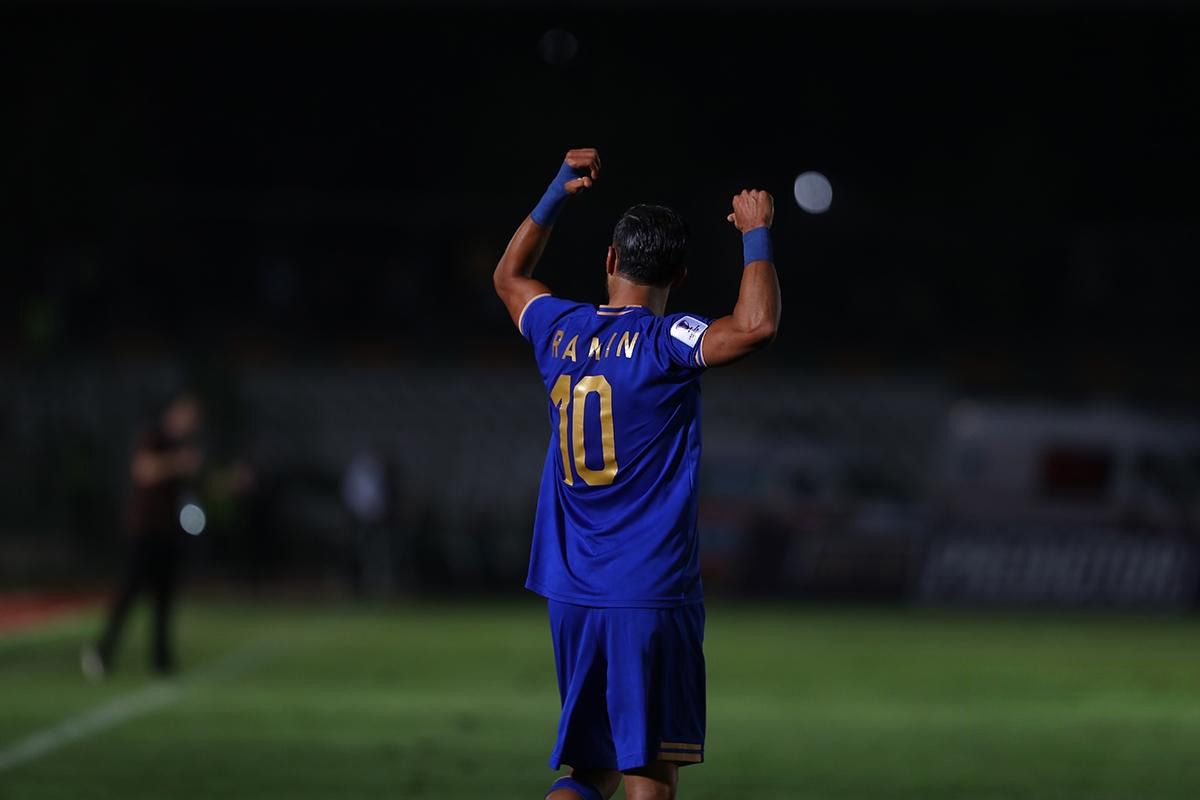
Esteghlal FC vs Al-Gharafa FC

=== Persepolis ===
Rezaeian joined Persepolis on 27 June 2015 with a two-year contract. He scored his first goal for Persepolis in a 2–0 victory against Siah Jamegan. On 26 December 2015, Rezaeian scored a 30-yard free kick against Padideh in stoppage time to earn them a 2–2 draw. After initially signing a contract with Turkish Süper Lig club Rizespor in the summer of 2016, Rezaeian cancelled his contract and re–joined Persepolis.

=== Oostende ===
After rejecting an offer from Tehran rivals Esteghlal F.C., Rezaeian joined Belgian club K.V. Oostende on 9 July 2017 with a two-year contract after a successful trial period at the club. Ramin made his debut on 27 July 2017 in a 3rd round Europa League qualifier against French club Olympique de Marseille. Oostende lost the match 4–2 and Rezaeian played the full 90 minutes.

=== Al Shahania ===
On 6 November 2018, Rezaeian joined Qatar Stars League side Al Shahania. In his first match with the club, on 8 November, Ramin scored a free kick goal in his team's 5–1 loss to Al Duhail. On 23 November, in his second match with his club, Ramin assisted his team's only goal in a 1–0 win against Al-Kharitiyath.

=== Al-Duhail ===
On 22 August 2020, Rezaeian signed a two-year contract with Qatar Stars League champion, Al-Duhail.

=== Al-Sailiya ===
After the engagement of the new trainer from Al-Duhail, Rezaein was loaned to Al-Sailiya.

=== Persepolis ===
On 12 February 2022, Rezaeian signed a contract with Persian Gulf Pro League champions Persepolis.

=== Sepahan ===
On 15 July 2022, Rezaeian signed a contract with Persian Gulf Pro League side Sepahan.

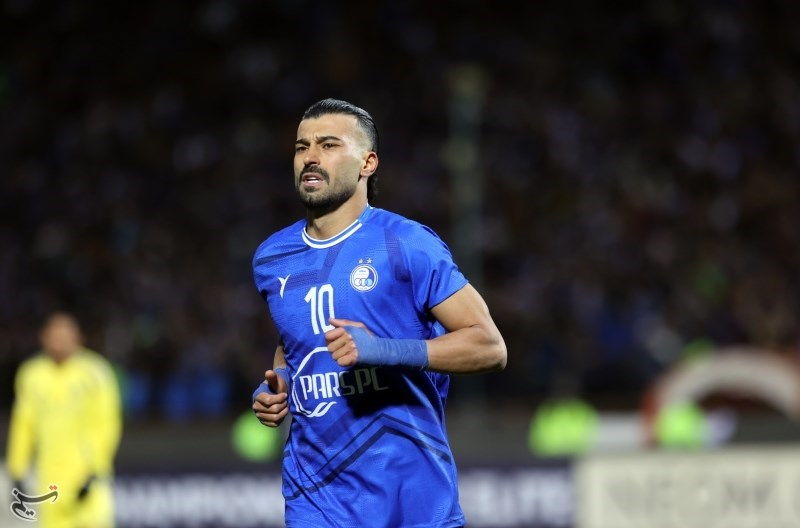
match between Esteghlal of Iran and Al-Nassr of Saudi Arabia

=== Esteghlal ===
In December 2024 while with Esteghlal, Rezaeian was summoned by Football Federation Islamic Republic of Iran after hugging a female fan, months after goalkeeper Hossein Hosseini was also summoned by the federation and faced a suspension and fine for embracing a female fan in April 2024. In his first game for Esteghlal against Shams Azar in Qazvin, he changed the outcome of the game in favor of Esteghlal with an assist to Mohammad Hossein Eslami in the final minutes, and the game ended with a 2–1 victory for Esteghlal. Rezaian played in his second game for Esteghlal against Malavan in Qazvin and managed to score two goals from the penalty spot for the Blues, and in addition to his first goal for Esteghlal, he was named the best player on the field. He also managed to register an assist in Tehran Derby.

His first Asian goal with Esteghlal came against Qatar's Al-Gharafa in the AFC Champions League Elite, and on the day Esteghlal defeated their Qatari rival 3–0, he also scored one of these goals, making it his first Asian goal with the Iranian blue team.

He also scored his first goal for Esteghlal in the Hazfi Cup, where he scored in extra time for Esteghlal in the round of 16 of the Hazfi Cup against Shams Azar.

== International career ==
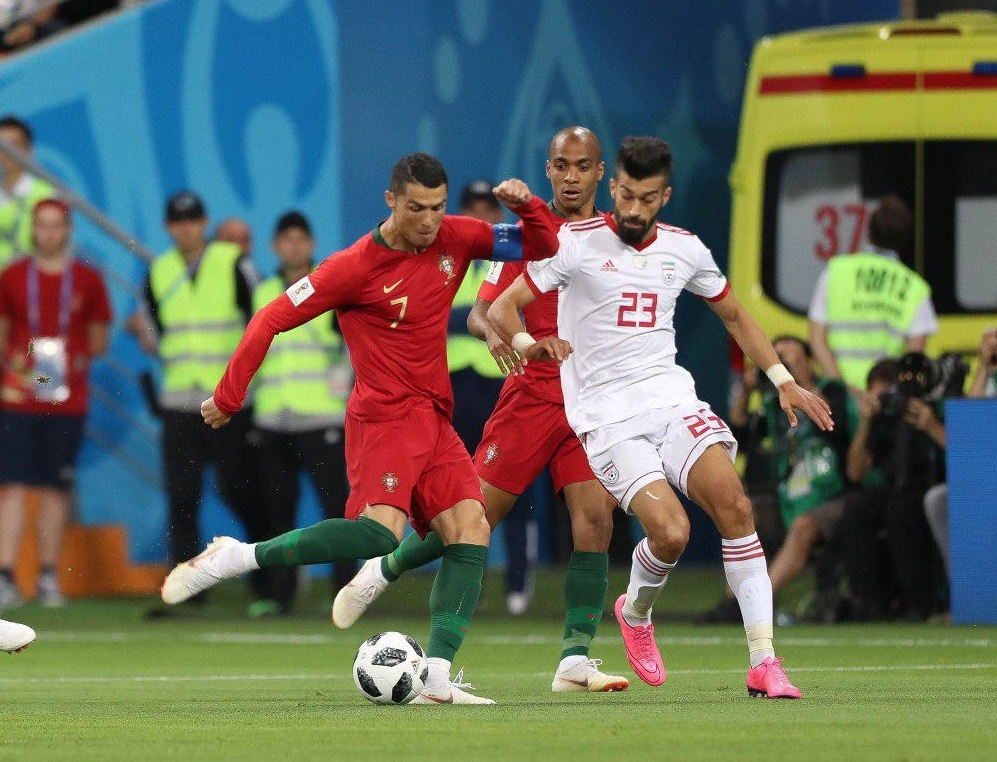
Rezaeian (in white) at the 2018 FIFA World Cup (Iran–Portugal match)

He was called into Iran's 2015 AFC Asian Cup squad on 30 December 2014 by Carlos Queiroz. He made his debut against Iraq in a friendly on 4 January 2015. He also played a friendly match against Sweden. Rezaeian scored his first international goal on 17 November 2015 in a 6–0 victory against Guam. In May 2018, he was named in Iran's preliminary squad for the 2018 FIFA World Cup in Russia.

Rezaeian was called up to the squad for the 2022 FIFA World Cup in Qatar. In the group stage match against Wales at the Ahmad bin Ali Stadium on 25 November 2022, Rezaeian scored the second goal to secure 2–0 victory for Iran.

He was also named in the 26-man squad for the 2026 FIFA World Cup. On 15 June 2026, Rezaeian scored Iran's first goal of the 2026 FIFA World Cup in their opening match against New Zealand which ended 2–2, making him the oldest Asian player ever to score in a FIFA World Cup game. He also assisted Mohammad Mohebi for Iran's second goal and was named man of the match. It was also the first time an Iranian player had ever tallied both a goal and an assist in a World Cup match. On June 26, he netted a goal and was named Man of the Match in a 1–1 draw with Egypt, becoming Iran's all-time top scorer at the World Cup with three goals, breaking the tie with Mehdi Taremi. In addition, his goal against Egypt within the first 14 minutes was the fastest scored by an Iranian player in FIFA World Cup history.

== Style of play ==
Rezaeian is skilled in long and fast starts as well as long passes, corner and free kicks. He also has good scoring skills.

BBC Persian wrote about him: "On the right side, Ramin Rezaeian is the key player of Branko. He is considered Branko's savior with his scoring power in difficult situations."

== Personal life ==
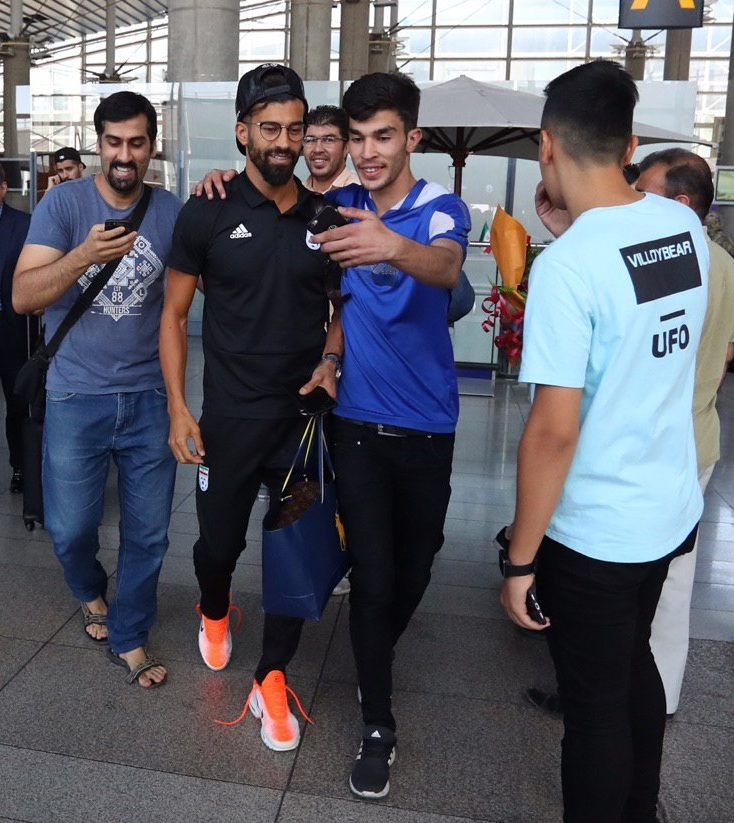
Rezaeian and fans in Tehran in 2019

He is popular among Iranian football fans, especially Persepolis fans. His father is a retired doctor and he has one older sister. He has announced that he controls his diet and loves ice cream.

=== Political views ===
After Iranian attacks on Israel during the Twelve-Day War, Rezaeian posted online, saying that "We are the Iranian people and we do not pay ransom to anyone. Long Live Iran."

In April 2026, Rezaeian offered his condolences to the Iranian nation on the assassination of Ali Khamenei by Israeli forces. He also stated that he will fight as a "soldier for Iran on the national team".

== Career statistics ==
=== Club ===
As of 27 February 2026

Appearances and goals by club, season and competition
Club	Season	League			National cup		Continental		Other		Total	
Club	Season	Division	Apps	Goals	Apps	Goals	Apps	Goals	Apps	Goals	Apps	Goals
Saba	2009–10	Iran Pro League	20	1	0	0	—		—		20	1
Saba	2010–11	Iran Pro League	22	1	1	0	—		—		23	1
Saba	2011–12	Iran Pro League	24	0	2	0	—		—		26	0
Saba	2012–13	Iran Pro League	31	4	0	0	1	0	—		32	4
Saba	Total		97	6	3	0	1	0	0	0	101	6
Rah Ahan	2013–14	Iran Pro League	27	2	3	2	—		—		30	4
Rah Ahan	2014–15	Iran Pro League	27	9	2	0	—		—		29	9
Rah Ahan	Total		54	11	5	2	0	0	0	0	59	13
Persepolis	2015–16	Iran Pro League	28	5	2	0	—		—		30	5
Persepolis	2016–17	Iran Pro League	12	4	1	0	1	0	—		14	4
Persepolis	Total		40	9	3	0	1	0	0	0	44	9
Oostende	2017–18	Belgian First Division A	16	1	2	0	2	0	5	1	25	2
Al Shahania	2018–19	Qatar Stars League	11	4	0	0	—		—		11	4
Al Shahania	2019–20	Qatar Stars League	21	13	0	0	—		1	0	22	13
Al Shahania	Total		32	17	0	0	0	0	1	0	33	17
Al Duhail	2019–20	Qatar Stars League	0	0	0	0	3	1	—		3	1
Al Duhail	2020–21	Qatar Stars League	10	2	—		—		0	0	10	2
Al Duhail	Total		10	2	0	0	3	1	0	0	13	3
Al Sailiya	2020–21	Qatar Stars League	11	3	2	0	0	0	5	0	18	3
Al Sailiya	2021–22	Qatar Stars League	13	2	—		0	0	5	2	18	4
Al Sailiya	Total		24	5	2	0	0	0	10	2	36	7
Persepolis	2021–22	Iran Pro League	13	0	1	0	—		—		14	0
Sepahan	2022–23	Persian Gulf Pro League	29	7	2	0	—	—	—	—	31	7
Sepahan	2023–24	Persian Gulf Pro League	27	8	5	1	7	5	—	—	39	14
Sepahan	Total		56	15	7	1	7	5	0	0	70	21
Esteghlal	2024–25	Persian Gulf Pro League	28	10	4	2	10	1	—		42	13
Esteghlal	2025–26	Persian Gulf Pro League	7	1	1	0	3	0	1	0	12	1
Esteghlal	Total		35	11	5	2	13	1	1	0	54	14
Foolad	2025–26	Persian Gulf Pro League	6	1	0	0	—		—		6	1
Career total			383	76	28	5	27	7	17	3	455	91

=== International ===
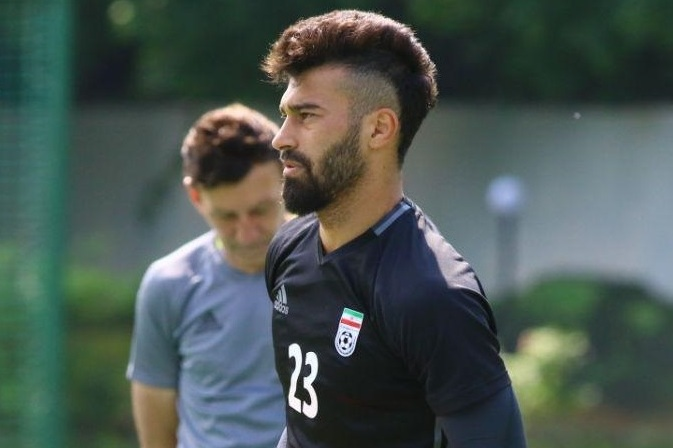
Ramin Rezaeian during Iran men's national football team's practice at Moscow's Locomotive Club in June 2018

As of 29 September 2026

Appearances and goals by national team and year
National team	Year	Apps	Goals
Iran	2015	7	1
Iran	2016	9	1
Iran	2017	8	0
Iran	2018	11	0
Iran	2019	10	0
Iran	2022	3	1
Iran	2023	10	3
Iran	2024	7	0
Iran	2025	5	0
Iran	2026	9	4
Total		79	10

Scores and results list Iran's goal tally first, score column indicates score after each Rezaeian goal.

List of international goals scored by Ramin Rezaeian
No.	Date	Venue	Cap	Opponent	Score	Result	Competition
1	17 November 2015	GFA National Training Center, Dededo, Guam	7	Guam	3–0	6–0	2018 FIFA World Cup qualification
2	10 November 2016	Shah Alam Stadium, Shah Alam, Malaysia	15	Papua New Guinea	8–1	8–1	Friendly
3	25 November 2022	Ahmad bin Ali Stadium, Al Rayyan, Qatar	47	Wales	2–0	2–0	2022 FIFA World Cup
4	28 March 2023	Azadi Stadium, Tehran, Iran	50	Kenya	2–1	2–1	Friendly
5	16 November 2023	Azadi Stadium, Tehran, Iran	57	Hong Kong	4–0	4–0	2026 FIFA World Cup qualification
6	21 November 2023	Milliy Stadium, Tashkent, Uzbekistan	58	Uzbekistan	1–0	2–2	2026 FIFA World Cup qualification
7	29 May 2026	Mardan Sports Complex, Antalya, Turkey	73	Gambia	2–1	3–1	Friendly
8	4 June 2026	Mardan Sports Complex, Antalya, Turkey	74	Mali	2–0	2–0	Friendly
9	15 June 2026	SoFi Stadium, Inglewood, United States	75	New Zealand	1–1	2–2	2026 FIFA World Cup
10	26 June 2026	Lumen Field, Seattle, United States	77	Egypt	1–1	1–1	2026 FIFA World Cup

== Honours ==
Persepolis

- Iran Pro League: 2016–17; runner-up: 2015–16 ، 2021–22

Al-Sailiya

- Qatari Stars Cup: 2020–21
- QFA Cup: 2021

Sepahan

- Iranian Hazfi Cup: 2023–24

Esteghlal

- Iranian Hazfi Cup: 2024–25

Individual

- Iran Pro League Team of the Season: 2014–15, 2015–16
