= Shohadaye Mes Kerman Stadium =

Football stadium in Kerman, Iran

Coordinates: 30°14′10″N 57°06′44″E

Shahid Raisi Stadium
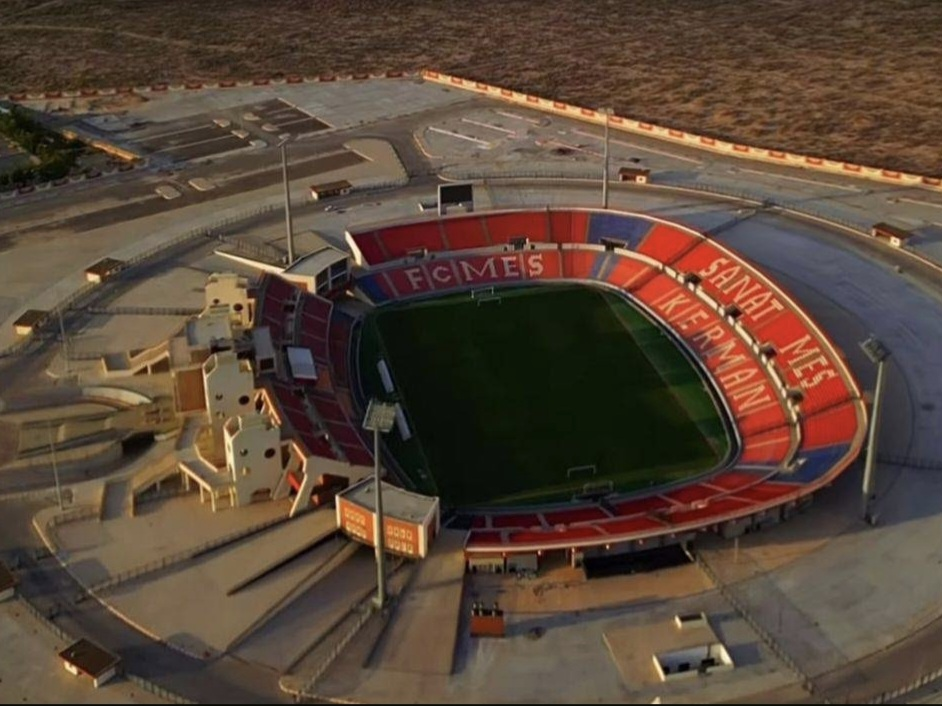
- Interactive map of Shahid Raisi Stadium
- Full name: Shohadaye Mes Kerman Stadium
- Location: Kerman, Iran
- Owner: Kerman's copper industries
- Operator: Kerman's copper industries
- Capacity: 30,000 seated
- Surface: Grass

Construction
- Built: 2006
- Opened: 2024

Tenant
- Mes Kerman

Shohadaye Mes Kerman Stadium-Shahid Raisi Stadium(Persian: ورزشگاه شهید رئیسی), is a football stadium located in the Kerman, Iran. It is owned by Kerman's copper industries, and currently is used by Mes Kerman.

== Features of Kerman Mes Stadium ==
One of the prominent features of this stadium is the proximity of the spectators to the grass field, which was achieved by leaving aside the tartan track. This stadium has a capacity of thirty thousand spectators. This project is the third fully roofed stadium in Iran, and the design of the shell and roof makes it special compared to other stadiums in Iran. Kerman Mes Football Stadium is the only Iranian football stadium at the FIFA Class 4 level and the only stadium in this country designed based on the latest edition of the FIFA standard.

The location of this stadium around a major tourist highway called Haftbagh and not too far from the Kerman metropolis are important features of its accessibility. Its public transportation includes buses.
