= Mes Rafsanjan Stadium =

Iranian football stadium

Mes Rafsanjan Stadium is a football stadium in the city of Rafsanjan, Iran. This stadium, with a capacity of 10,000 people, was inaugurated on 3 November 2023, coinciding with the match between Mes Rafsanjan and Foolad.

It is currently home to Persian Gulf Pro League side Mes.

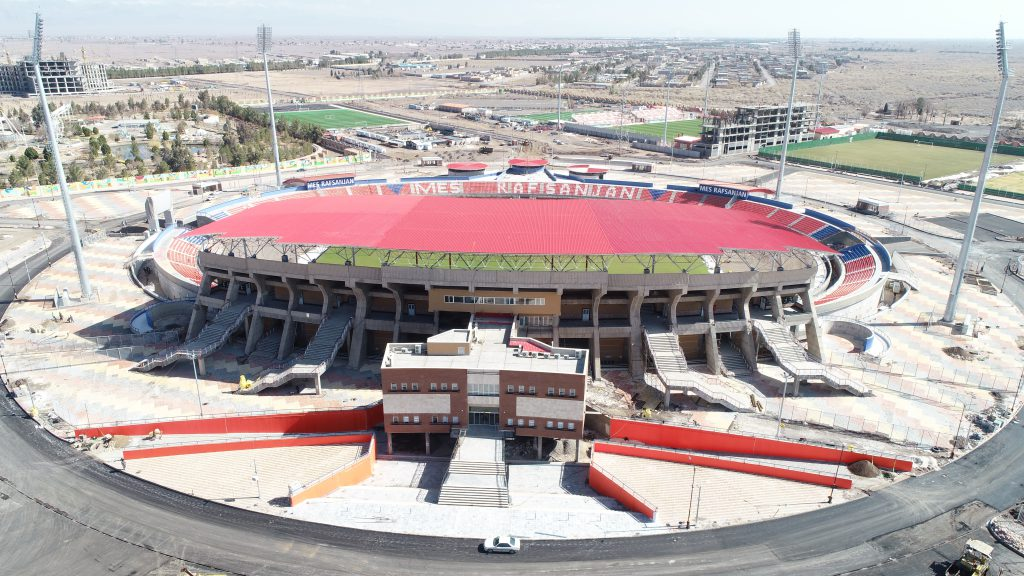
rafsanjan mes estadium

== Opening match ==
The first official match held in this stadium was between Mes Rafsanjan and Foolad, which ended with a score of 3–0.

== Facilities ==
The Mes Rafsanjan Stadium complex, with a capacity of 10,000 people, includes a gym, swimming pool, technique hall, amphitheater hall.
