= Mohammad Javad Hosseinnejad =

Iranian footballer

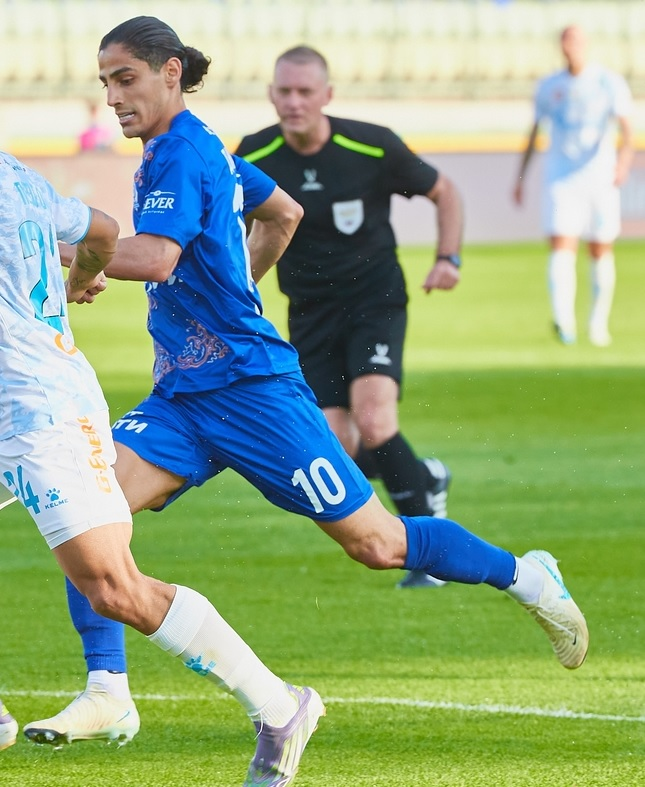
- Hosseinnejad with Dynamo Makhachkala in 2025

Personal information
- Full name: Mohammad Javad Hosseinnejad Mahalleh Kolaei
- Date of birth: 26 June 2003 (age 23)
- Place of birth: Juybar, Iran
- Height: 1.80 m (5 ft 11 in)
- Position: Midfielder

Team information
- Current team: Dynamo Makhachkala
- Number: 10

Youth career
- 2019–2023: Sepahan

Senior career*
Years	Team	Apps	(Gls)
2023–2024	Sepahan	22	(0)
2024–	Dynamo Makhachkala	61	(8)

International career^{‡}
2022–2023	Iran U20	5	(2)
2023–	Iran U23	9	(2)
2023–	Iran	6	(0)
- * Club domestic league appearances and goals as of 22 November 2026 ‡ National team caps and goals as of 14 November 2026

Mohammad Javad Hosseinnejad (Persian: محمدجواد حسین نژاد محله کلایی; born 26 June 2003) is an Iranian footballer who plays as a midfielder for Dynamo Makhachkala in the Russian Premier League. He has also played for Iran national team.

== Club career ==
On 9 August 2024, Hosseinnejad signed a contract with Russian Premier League newcomers Dynamo Makhachkala. On his debut on 19 August 2024 against Akhmat Grozny, he scored the only goal of the game to give Dynamo their first RPL victory and was named man of the match. In his third game on 1 September 2024 against Krylia Sovetov Samara, he assisted on Dynamo's goal in 1–0 victory which was the first away RPL victory for Dynamo, and was selected as man of the match again.

== Personal life ==
On 1 January 2026, Hosseinnejad publicly supported the 2025–2026 Iranian protests on his Instagram, saying: "Protests and strikes are not a fight with this precious and dear land; they are a sign of pain that must be seen."

On 16 January, just before their match against South Korea in the 2026 AFC U-23 Asian Cup, Hosseinnejad, along with his entire team, refused to sing "Mehr-e Khavaran", the national anthem of the Islamic Republic of Iran, in solidarity with the 2025–2026 Iranian protests.

== Career statistics ==
As of 22 November 2026

Appearances and goals by club, season and competition
Club	Season	League			National cup (Note: Includes Iranian Hazfi Cup, Russian Cup)		Continental		Other		Total	
Club	Season	Division	Apps	Goals	Apps	Goals	Apps	Goals	Apps	Goals	Apps	Goals
Sepahan	2022–23	Pro League	1	0	0	0	—		—		1	0
Sepahan	2023–24	Pro League	21	0	3	0	4 (Note: Appearances in AFC Champions League)	2	—		28	2
Sepahan	Total		22	0	3	0	4	2	0	0	29	2
Dynamo Makhachkala	2024–25	Russian Premier League	24	3	5	0	—		—		29	3
Dynamo Makhachkala	2025–26	Russian Premier League	29	4	8	0	—		1 (Note: Appearances in relegation play-offs)	0	38	4
Dynamo Makhachkala	2026–27	Russian Premier League	8	1	4	0	—		—		12	1
Dynamo Makhachkala	Total		61	8	17	0	0	0	1	0	79	8
Career total			83	8	20	0	4	2	1	0	108	10

=== International ===
As of match played 14 Novembr 2026

Appearances and goals by national team and year
National team	Year	Apps	Goals
Iran
Iran	2023	2	0
Iran	2024	1	0
Iran	2025	2	0
Iran	2026	1	0
Total		6	0

== Honours ==
Sepahan

- Iranian Hazfi Cup: 2023–24
