= Isa Moradi =

Iranian footballer

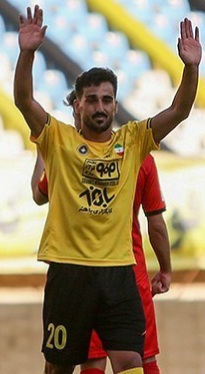

Personal information
- Full name: EIsa Moradi
- Date of birth: 25 May 1997 (age 29)
- Place of birth: Qeydar, Iran
- Height: 1.77 m (5 ft 10 in)
- Position: Forward

Team information
- Current team: Kheybar Khorramabad
- Number: 10

Senior career*
Years	Team	Apps	(Gls)
2019–2021	Naft Iranian		(17)
2020	→ Parag Tehran (loan)		
2021–2022	Shohadaye Razakan Alborz	12	(4)
2022	Daraei		(2)
2022	Khooshe Talaei	0	(0)
2022–2025	Sepahan	15	(3)
2023–2024	→ Shams Azar (loan)	26	(4)
2024–2025	→ Mes Rafsanjan (loan)	19	(3)
2025–	Kheybar Khorramabad	25	(4)
- * Club domestic league appearances and goals as of 15 June 2023

Isa Moradi (Persian: عیسی مرادی, born 25 May 1997) is an Iranian footballer who plays for Persian Gulf Pro League club Kheybar Khorramabad.

== Club career ==
=== Naft Iranian ===
Moradi scored 17 times in 2020–21, and became the league's top scorer.

=== Sepahan ===
On 18 August 2022, Moradi joined Sepahan on a five-year contract. He made his debut on 5 September 2022 against Zob Ahan as a substitute for Yasin Salmani.

== Honours ==
Individual

- League 3 top scorer: 2020–21 (17 goals)
