= Mohammad Ghorbani (footballer) =

Iranian footballer

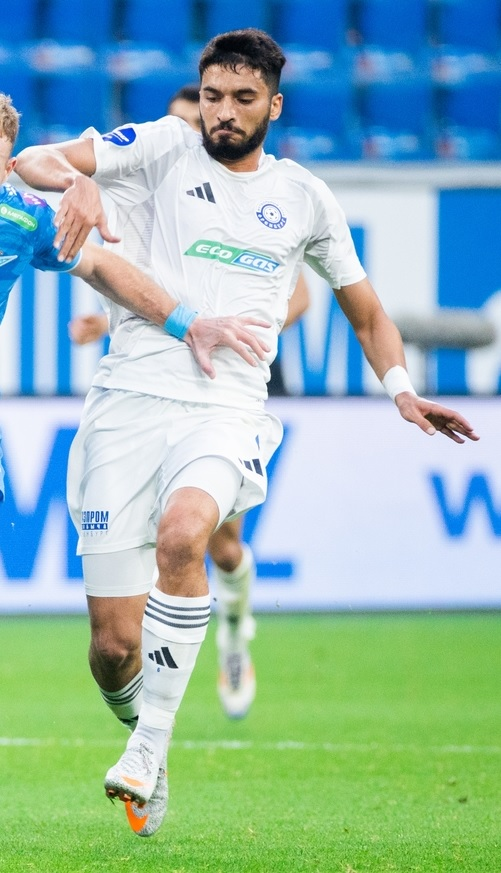
- Ghorbani with Orenburg in 2024

Personal information
- Date of birth: 7 October 2001 (age 25)
- Place of birth: Arak, Iran
- Height: 1.90 m (6 ft 3 in)
- Positions: Defensive midfielder; centre-back

Team information
- Current team: Al Wahda
- Number: 6

Youth career
- 2018–2020: Havadar

Senior career*
Years	Team	Apps	(Gls)
2020–2022	Nassaji	13	(0)
2022–2024	Sepahan	34	(0)
2024–2025	Orenburg	29	(2)
2025–	Al Wahda	33	(2)

International career^{‡}
2022–	Iran U23	12	(2)
2024–	Iran	21	(0)
Medal record
Representing Iran
CAFA Nations Cup
Runner-up	2025 Tajikistan–Uzbekistan	Team
- * Club domestic league appearances and goals as of 16 May 2026 ‡ National team caps and goals as of 17 November 2026

Mohammad Ghorbani (Persian: محمد قربانی; born 7 October 2001) is an Iranian professional footballer who plays for Emirati club Al Wahda and the Iran national team.

== Club career ==
=== Nassaji Mazandaran ===
He made his debut for Nassaji Mazandaran in the first fixtures of 2021–22 Persian Gulf Pro League against Fajr Sepasi Shiraz.

=== Orenburg ===
On 21 February 2024, Ghorbani joined Russian Premier League club Orenburg.

=== Al Wahda ===
On 5 February 2025, Ghorbani moved to Al Wahda in the United Arab Emirates.

== International career ==
Ghorbani was called up for the first time to the senior Iran national team in November 2022 for a friendly against Nicaragua, but remained on the bench in the game.

Ghorbani made his debut on 26 March 2024 in a World Cup qualifier against Turkmenistan.

On 1 June 2026, he was named in the 26-man squad for the 2026 FIFA World Cup.

== Career statistics ==
=== Club ===
As of match played 16 May 2026

Club	Season	League			National cup (Note: Includes Hazfi Cup, Russian Cup)		Continental		Other		Total	
Club	Season	Division	Apps	Goals	Apps	Goals	Apps	Goals	Apps	Goals	Apps	Goals
Nassaji	2020–21	Pro League	1	0	0	0	—		—		1	0
Nassaji	2021–22	Pro League	12	0	2	0	—		—		14	0
Nassaji	Total		13	0	2	0	—		—		15	0
Sepahan	2022–23	Pro League	20	0	2	0	—		—		22	0
Sepahan	2023–24	Pro League	14	0	0	0	6 (Note: Appearances in AFC Champions League)	2	—		20	2
Sepahan	Total		34	0	2	0	6	2	—		42	2
Orenburg	2023–24	Russian Premier League	11	1	3	2	—		—		14	3
Orenburg	2024–25	Russian Premier League	18	1	1	0	—		—		19	1
Orenburg	Total		29	2	4	2	—		—		33	4
Al Wahda	2024–25	UAE Pro League	11	1	0	0	—		—		11	1
Al Wahda	2025–26	UAE Pro League	22	1	2	0	7	0	5	0	36	1
Al Wahda	Total		33	2	2	0	7	0	5	0	47	2
Career totals			109	4	10	2	13	2	5	0	137	8

=== International ===
As of match played 17 November 2026

Appearances and goals by national team and year
National team	Year	Apps	Goals
Iran	2024	7	0
Iran	2025	6	0
Iran	2026	8	0
Total		21	0
