= Mohammad Reza Saket =

Iranian football executive

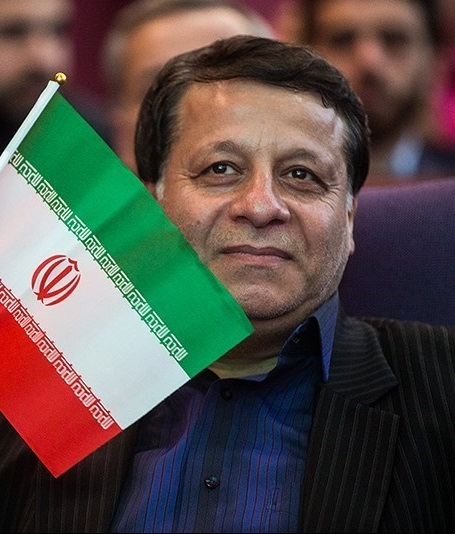
- Born: 8 February 1962 (age 63); Isfahan, Iran
- Occupations: Football Administrator; Former General Secretary of Football Federation Islamic Republic of Iran
- Known for: Chairman of Sepahan
- Title: Chairman of Foolad Mahan

Mohammad Reza Saket (Persian: محمدرضا ساکت; born 8 February 1962 in Isfahan) is an Iranian football administrator. He was formerly the chairman of the Sepahan F.C. from 2020 to 2023 for second term. Who was representative of club chairpersons of Football Federation Islamic Republic of Iran from 2022 to 2025.

He was the former general secretary of Football Federation Islamic Republic of Iran and the chairman of Iranian football club Sepahan F.C. from 2002 until his resignation in 2011.

== Titles ==
  - Iran Pro League (3): 2002–03, 2009–10, 2010–11
  - Hazfi Cup (3): 2004, 2006, 2007

Business positions
Preceded by Foroud Ahmadi	Sepahan chairman 1999–2011	Succeeded by Alireza Rahimi
Preceded by Alireza Asadi	Football Federation Islamic Republic of Iran general secretary 2017–2018	Succeeded by Ebrahim Shakouri
Preceded by Manouchehr Nikfar	Sepahan chairman 2020–present	Succeeded by Incumbent
