= Shahriyar Moghanlou =

Iranian footballer

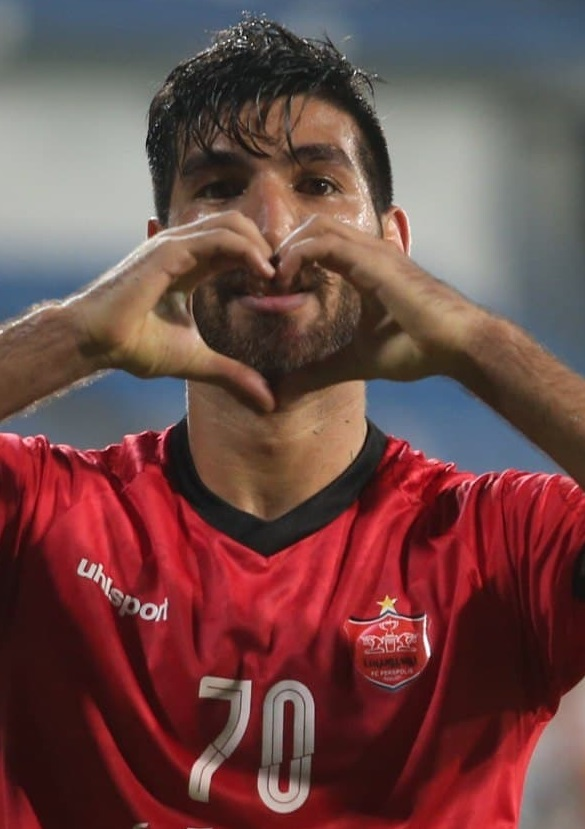
- Moghanlou with Persepolis in 2021 AFC Champions League

Personal information
- Full name: Shahriyar Moghanlou
- Date of birth: 21 December 1994 (age 31)
- Place of birth: Zanjan, Iran
- Height: 1.92 m (6 ft 3 1/2 in)
- Position: Striker

Team information
- Current team: Tractor
- Number: 70

Youth career
- 2011–2014: Sorkhpooshan
- 2014–2015: Paykan

Senior career*
Years	Team	Apps	(Gls)
2015–2020	Paykan	78	(16)
2017–2019	→ Malavan (loan)	56	(23)
2020–2021	Santa Clara	11	(0)
2021	→ Persepolis (loan)	13	(4)
2021–2024	Sepahan	82	(37)
2024–2026	Kalba	51	(16)
2026–	Tractor	8	(3)

International career^{‡}
2023–	Iran	24	(2)
Medal record
Representing Iran
CAFA Nations Cup
Runner-up	2025 Tajikistan–Uzbekistan	Team
- * Club domestic league appearances and goals as of 15 May 2026 ‡ National team caps and goals as of 27 June 2026

Shahriyar Moghanlou (Persian: شهريار مغانلو; born 21 December 1994) is an Iranian professional footballer who plays as a centre-forward for Persian Gulf Pro League club Tractor and the Iran national team.

== Club career ==
Shahriyar was born in the city of Zanjan to an Iranian Azerbaijani family. Moghanlou started his professional career with Paykan while he promoted to the first team in the winter of 2015. He made his professional debut for Paykan against Gostaresh Foulad on 4 February 2015 when he was used as a substitute for Ali Hosseini.

=== Santa Clara ===
On 23 September 2020, Moghanlou signed a three-year contract with Portuguese Primeira Liga side Santa Clara.

=== Persepolis ===
On 7 March 2021, Moghanlou signed a contract with Persian Gulf Pro League champions Persepolis. The details of the fee contract have not been released.

== International career ==
He made his senior debut on 23 March 2023 against Russia in a friendly match.

He scored his first international goal on 12 September 2023 against Angola in a friendly match.

On 1 June 2026, he was named in the 26-man squad for the 2026 FIFA World Cup.

== Career statistics ==
=== Club ===
As of 15 May 2026

Club	Division	Season	League		National Cup		Continental		Other		Total	
Club	Division	Season	Apps	Goals	Apps	Goals	Apps	Goals	Apps	Goals	Apps	Goals
Paykan	Persian Gulf Pro League	2014–15	2	0	—		—		—		2	0
Paykan	Azadegan League	2015–16	29	2	0	0	—		—		29	2
Paykan	Persian Gulf Pro League	2016–17	19	1	1	0	—		—		20	1
Paykan	Persian Gulf Pro League	2019–20	28	13	0	0	—		—		28	13
Paykan	Total		78	16	1	0	—		—		79	16
Malavan (loan)	Azadegan League	2017–18	30	7	2	0	—		—		32	7
Malavan (loan)	Azadegan League	2018–19	26	16	0	0	—		—		26	16
Malavan (loan)	Total		56	23	2	0	—		—		58	23
Santa Clara	Primeira Liga	2020–21	11	0	2	1	—		—		13	1
Santa Clara	Total		11	0	2	1	—		—		13	1
Persepolis (loan)	Persian Gulf Pro League	2020–21	13	4	2	0	6	4	1	0	22	8
Persepolis (loan)	Total		13	4	2	0	6	4	1	0	22	8
Sepahan	Persian Gulf Pro League	2021–22	27	8	1	0	5	3	—		33	11
Sepahan	Persian Gulf Pro League	2022–23	28	13	2	3	—		—		30	16
Sepahan	Persian Gulf Pro League	2023–24	27	16	4	2	6	1	—		37	19
Sepahan	Total		82	37	7	5	11	4	—		100	46
Kalba	UAE Pro League	2024–25	26	8	0	0	0	0	3	1	29	9
Kalba	UAE Pro League	2025–26	25	8	0	0	0	0	2	0	27	8
Kalba	Total		51	16	0	0	0	0	5	1	56	17
Career total			291	96	14	6	17	8	6	1	328	111

=== International ===
As of match played on 27 June 2026

Appearances and goals by national team and year
National team	Year	Apps	Goals
Iran	2023	4	1
Iran	2024	10	1
Iran	2025	4	0
Iran	2026	6	0
Total		24	2

No.	Date	Venue	Opponent	Score	Result	Competition
1	12 September 2023	Azadi Stadium, Tehran, Iran	Angola	4–0	4–0	Friendly
2	9 January 2024	Al Rayyan Training, Al Ryyan, Qatar	Indonesia	3–0	5–0	Friendly

== Honours ==
=== Club ===
Paykan

- Azadegan League (1): 2015–16

Persepolis

- Persian Gulf Pro League (1): 2020–21
- Iranian Super Cup (1): 2020

Sepahan

- Iranian Hazfi Cup: 2023–24

=== Individual ===
- Azadegan League Top Goalscorer (1): 2018–19
- Persian Gulf Pro League Top Goalscorer (2): 2022–23, 2023–24

== Personal life ==
On 3 January 2026, Moghanloo publicly supported the 2025–2026 Iranian protests, stating: "We are doing the hardest thing in the world because we are both sad and hopeful. We are both homesick and full of hope. We are both tired and full of struggle to live."
