= Alireza Sadeghi =

Iranian footballer (born 1999)

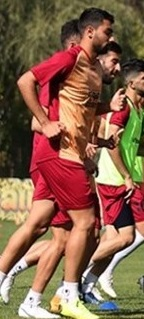

Personal information
- Full name: Alireza Sadeghi
- Date of birth: 14 March 1999 (age 27)
- Place of birth: Mashhad, Iran
- Height: 1.87 m (6 ft 2 in)
- Position: Forward

Youth career
- 2014–2017: Shahab Khorasan
- 2017–2020: Sepahan

Senior career*
Years	Team	Apps	(Gls)
2020–2022	Sepahan	2	(0)
2021–2022	→ Aluminium Arak (loan)	2	(0)

International career
2017–2019	Iran U20	12	(3)
- * Club domestic league appearances and goals as of 19 June 2022

Alireza Sadeghi (born 14 March 1999) is an Iranian footballer who played as a forward for Sepahan in the Persian Gulf Pro League.

== Career ==
Sadeghi made his Iran Pro League debut on 6 March 2021 against Aluminium Arak.

He became the top-scorer of Iran U-19 and U-21 Iran Football Leagues for three seasons from 2017 to 2020.

== Career statistics ==
As of 1 July 2021

Appearances and goals by club, season and competition
Club	Season	League			Hazfi Cup		Asia		Total	
Club	Season	Division	Apps	Goals	Apps	Goals	Apps	Goals	Apps	Goals
Sepahan	2020–21	Iran Pro League	2	0	0	0	0	0	2	0
Career total			2	0	0	0	0	0	2	0
