= Amirmohammad Mohkamkar =

Iranian footballer (born 2001)

Personal information
- Date of birth: 20 December 2001 (age 24)
- Place of birth: Badeleh, Miandorud, Iran
- Height: 1.79 m (5 ft 10 in)
- Position: Left winger

Team information
- Current team: Shams Azar
- Number: 10

Youth career
- –2018: Padideh Sari
- 2018–2021: Sepahan

Senior career*
| Years | Team | Apps | (Gls) |
| 2021–2022 | Sepahan | 3 | (0) |
| 2023 | Saipa | 11 | (2) |
| 2023–2025 | Esteghlal Khuzestan | 34 | (2) |
| 2025– | Shams Azar | 30 | (0) |
- * Club domestic league appearances and goals as of 17/2/24 @ 07:14(AEST)

Amirmohammad Mohkamkar (Persian: امیرمحمد محکم‌کار; born 20 December 2001) is an Iranian footballer who currently plays for Shams Azar in the Persian Gulf Pro League.

== Club career ==
=== Sepahan ===
Mohkamkar made his debut for Sepahan in 13th fixtures of 2021–22 Iran Pro League against Shahr Khodro while he substituted in for Farshad Ahmadzadeh.
