= Christopher Knett =

Austrian footballer

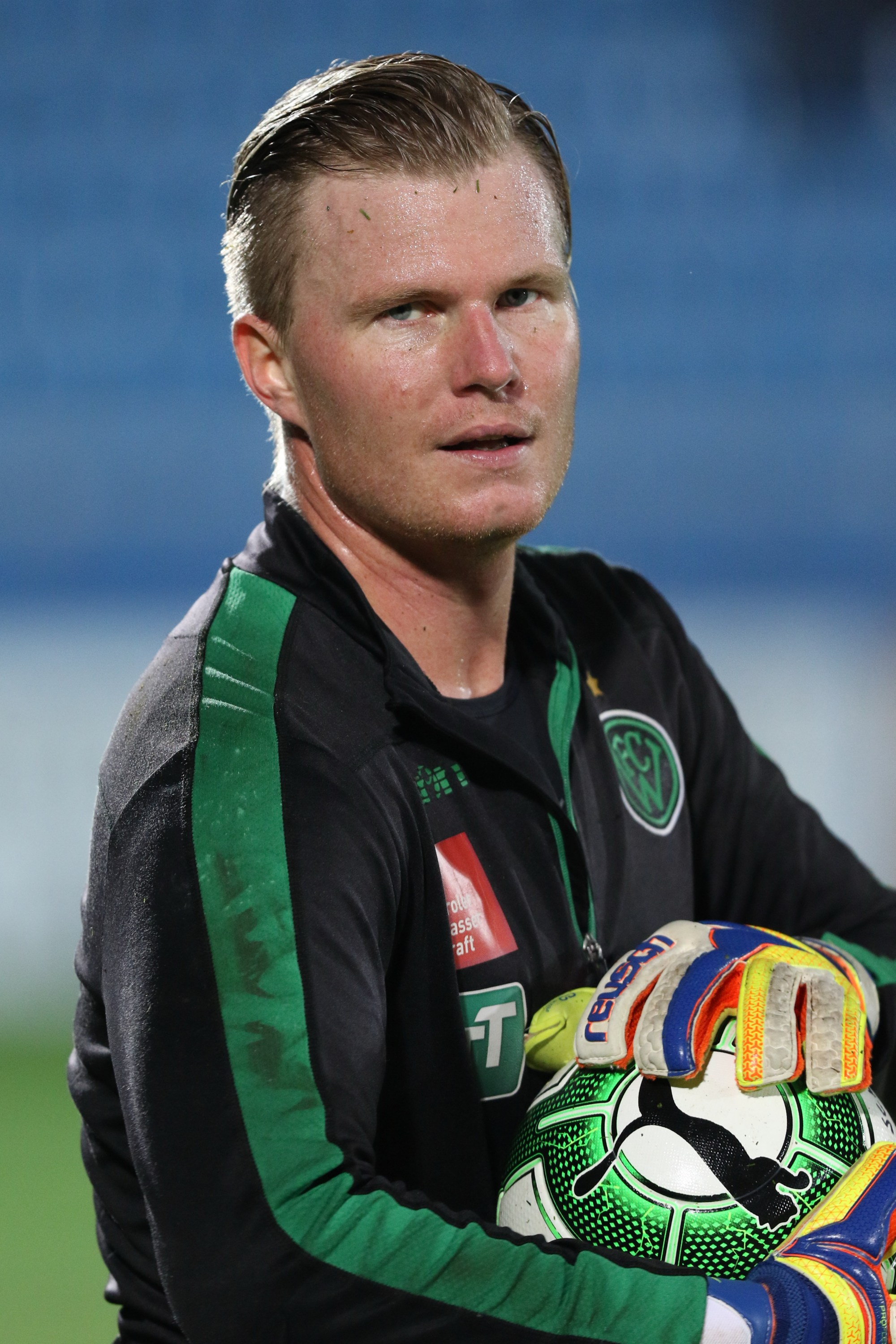

Personal information
- Date of birth: 1 August 1990 (age 36)
- Place of birth: Vienna, Austria
- Height: 1.84 m (6 ft 0 in)
- Position: Goalkeeper

Team information
- Current team: SKN St. Pölten
- Number: 1

Youth career
- 1996–1998: Hellas Kagran
- 1998–2000: FC Stadlau
- 2000–2006: Austria Wien
- 2006–2008: Sonnenhof Großaspach
- 2008: Hoffenheim

Senior career*
Years	Team	Apps	(Gls)
2008–2009	Hoffenheim II	1	(0)
2009–2013	Sonnenhof Großaspach	94	(0)
2013–2017	Austria Lustenau	138	(0)
2017–2019	Wacker Innsbruck	61	(0)
2019–2021	Panetolikos	45	(0)
2021–2022	Sepahan	18	(0)
2022–2024	Foolad	53	(0)
2025	Al-Arabi	0	(0)
2025–	SKN St. Pölten	25	(0)
- * Club domestic league appearances and goals as of 17 May 2026

Christopher Knett (born 1 August 1990) is an Austrian professional footballer who played as a goalkeeper for SKN St. Pölten.
