= Nilson Júnior (footballer, born 1991) =

Brazilian footballer

Personal information
- Full name: Nilson Barbosa Nascimento Júnior
- Date of birth: 9 September 1991 (age 35)
- Place of birth: Maceió, Brazil
- Height: 1.90 m (6 ft 3 in)
- Position: Centre-back

Team information
- Current team: Malut United
- Number: 2

Youth career
- 2008–2012: CRB

Senior career*
Years	Team	Apps	(Gls)
2012–2014	CRB	6	(0)
2012–2013	→ Moreirense (loan)	0	(0)
2015	Boquinhense	10	(4)
2016	7 Setembro	10	(0)
2017	Santa Rita	13	(0)
2017	Coruripe	5	(2)
2017–2018	Sousa		
2018–2020	Treze	31	(0)
2019	→ Cascavel (loan)	3	(0)
2019	→ Jacuipense (loan)	3	(0)
2019	→ América SE (loan)		
2021	Vila Nova	9	(1)
2021–2022	Sampaio Corrêa	54	(0)
2022–2023	Sepahan	29	(1)
2024–2025	Ponte Preta	17	(0)
2025	Operário Ferroviário	4	(0)
2025–	Malut United	21	(1)
- * Club domestic league appearances and goals as of 28 April 2026

Nilson Barbosa Nascimento Júnior (born 9 September 1991) is a Brazilian professional footballer who plays as a centre-back for CSA club Brasileirão Série D.

== Career ==
On 5 August 2022, Nilson signed a two-year contract with Iranian Persian Gulf Pro League side Sepahan.

On 10 September 2025, he signed with Indonesian club Malut United.
