= Mes Rafsanjan F.C. =

Iranian football club

Mes Rafsanjan مس رفسنجان
- Full name: Mes Rafsanjan Football Club
- Founded: 1995; 28 years ago
- Ground: Mes Rafsanjan Stadium
- Capacity: 10,000; 3,800
- Owner: NICICO
- Chairman: Mohammad Momeni
- Head Coach: Farshad Pious
- League: Azadegan League
- 2025–26: Persian Gulf Pro League, 16th of 16 (relegated via play-off)
- Website: https://mesrafsanjan.com/
Home colours	Away colours

Mes Rafsanjan Football Club is an Iranian football club based in Rafsanjan, Iran. The club is owned by the Copper Industries Company, a nationalised Iranian copper industry company, after which the club is named.

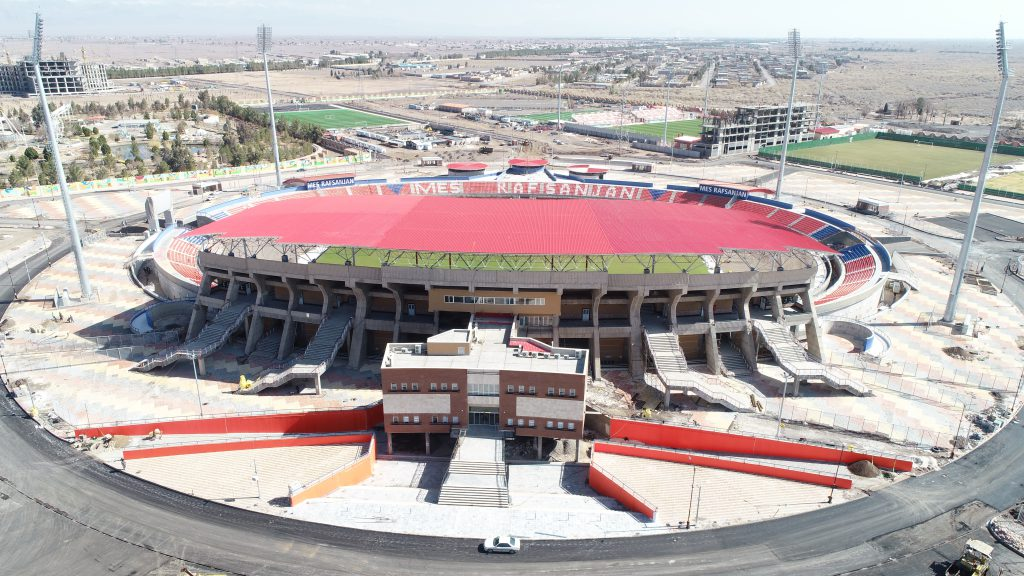
Rafsanjan Mes Stadium

== History ==
In 1995 the national Iranian copper industry decided to form a football club in Rafsanjan, one of its focus cities. It would go on to form another football team in Kerman a year later, also named after the national copper industry.

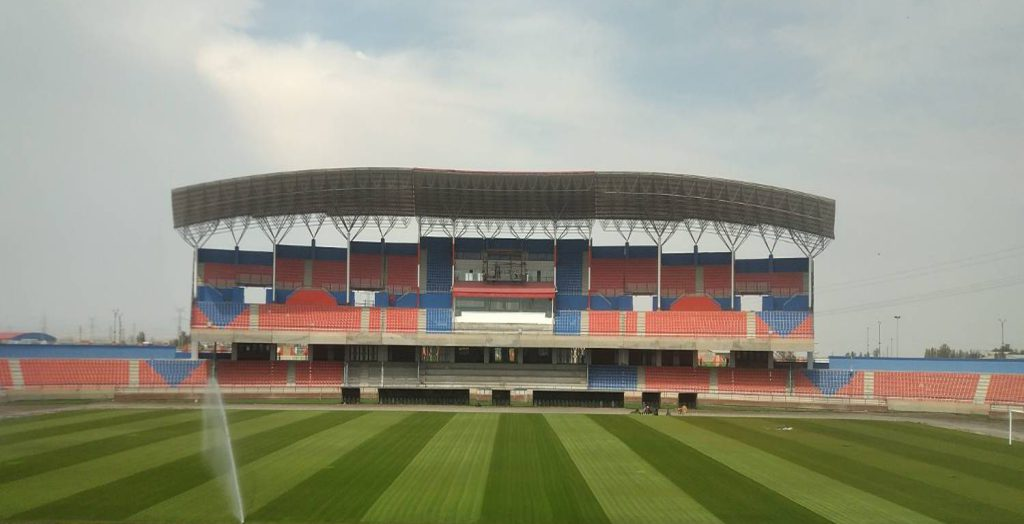
Rafsanjan Mes Stadium

Mes Rafsanjan knocked out a number of Persian Gulf Pro League clubs in the Hazfi Cup of 2008–09, including Foolad and Esteghlal Tehran. The club was later defeated by the eventual champions Zob Ahan in the semi-finals.

In 2020 Mes Refanjan were promoted to the Persian Gulf Pro League, where they have enjoyed moderate success.

== Season-by-season ==
The table below shows the achievements of the club in various competitions.

Season	League	Position	Hazfi Cup	Notes
2006–07	League 2	2nd	Withdrew	Promoted
2007–08	Azadegan League	4th	Withdrew	
2008–09	Azadegan League	3rd	Quarterfinals	
2009–10	Azadegan League	7th	1/4 Final	
2010–11	Azadegan League	9th	2nd Round	
2011–12	Azadegan League	12th	1/16 Final	
2012–13	Azadegan League	11th	1/8 Final	
2013–14	Azadegan League	6th	1/16 Final	
2014–15	Azadegan League	2nd	1/32 Final	
2015–16	Azadegan League	5th	Withdrew	
2016–17	Azadegan League	11th	1/16 Final	
2017–18	Azadegan League	10th	1/32 Final	
2018–19	Azadegan League	10th	1/32 Final	
2019–20	Azadegan League	1st	withdraw	Promoted
2020–21	Persian Gulf Pro League	8th	1/32 Final	
2021–22	Persian Gulf Pro League	6th	Quarterfinals	
2022–23	Persian Gulf Pro League	5th	1/16 Final	
2023–24	Persian Gulf Pro League	10th	Runner-up	

== Honours ==
- Azadegan League
  - Champions (1): 2019–20
- Hazfi Cup
  - Runners-up (1): 2023–24

== Players ==
=== First-team squad ===
Note: Flags indicate national team as defined under FIFA eligibility rules; some limited exceptions apply. Players may hold more than one non-FIFA nationality.

No.	Pos.	Nation	Player
1	GK	IRI	Payam Parsa
2	DF	IRI	Amir Hossein Sedghi
3	DF	IRI	Reza Aliyari
5	DF	IRI	Meysam Joudaki
6	DF	IRI	Mojtaba Lotfi
7	FW	IRI	Hossein Karimzadeh
8	MF	IRI	Reza Moghanlou
9	MF	IRI	Ali Najafi
10	FW	IRI	Yousef Keyshams
11	FW	IRI	Aria Barzegar
15	DF	IRI	Mehdi Tahmasebzadeh
17	MF	IRI	Ali Asghar Sadeghinasab
18	MF	IRI	Milad Souri
19	FW	IRI	Mohammad Hossein Harandi
20	FW	IRI	Mohammad Saberipour
22	GK	IRI	Koroush Maleki
23	DF	IRI	Ali Akbar Ranjbar
28	FW	IRI	Farbod Dadashtabar
30	FW	IRI	Salman Ghaffari

No.	Pos.	Nation	Player
32	MF	IRI	Mohammadreza Rahimi
33	GK	IRI	Mohammad Sadegh Salehi
35	MF	IRI	Reza Akbarian
36	MF	IRI	Mohammad Reza Jahani
38	DF	IRI	Reza Bemani
39	DF	IRI	Mohammad Mehdi Moshref
40	GK	IRI	Amir Hossein Alizadeh
41	FW	IRI	Parham Azimi
49	MF	IRI	Mohammad Alizadeh
50	DF	IRI	Vahid Heydarieh
55	DF	IRI	Amirali Torkzadeh
59	DF	IRI	Payam Rezania
70	MF	IRI	Mehdi Zeydabadi
77	DF	IRI	Amir Mohammad Panahi
78	MF	IRI	Hesam Choubdari
79	FW	IRI	Sajjad Golmohammadi
84	DF	IRI	Abolfazl Mahdavi
87	MF	IRI	Mohammad Akbarinasab
99	FW	IRI	Amin Nasserzadeh

For recent transfers, see List of Iranian football transfers summer 2022.

== Coaches ==
=== Head coaches ===
Name	Nationality	Years
Vinko Begović	(Croatia)	2013–2015
Mišo Krstičević	(Croatia)	2015–2016
Ali Asghar Kalantari	(Iran)	2016
Mišo Krstičević	(Croatia)	2016–2017
Ali Samereh	(Iran)	2017–2018
Mišo Krstičević	(Croatia)	2018–2019
Mohammad Rabiei	(Iran)	2019–2023
Saket Elhami	(Iran)	2023–2024
Moharram Navidkia	(Iran)	2024
Masoud Shojaei	(Iran)	2024-2025
Sirous Pourmousavi	(Iran)	2025 - current
