= 2026–27 Persepolis F.C. season =

Persepolis
2026–27 season
- President: Peyman Haddadi
- Head coach: Mehdi Tartar (from 5 July 2026)
- Stadium: Azadi and Shohada-ye Shahr-e Qods
- Persian Gulf Pro League: 2nd
- Top goalscorer: Ali Alipour (5)
- Biggest win: 4–1 vs Esteghlal Khuzestan; 3–0 vs Malavan; 3–0 vs Mes Shahr-e Babak; 3–0 vs Paykan
- Biggest defeat: 1–2 vs Fajr Sepasi; 0–1 vs Tractor; 0–1 vs Foolad
Home colours	Away colours
- All statistics correct as of 20 November 2026.

The 2026–27 season is the Persepolis's 26nd season in the Persian Gulf Pro League, and their 44st consecutive season in the top division of Iranian Football. In addition to the domestic league, Persepolis will also participate in this season's Hazfi Cup competiti ons.

== Kits ==
- Supplier: (Iran) Yousef Jameh
- Sponsors: Asan Pardakht, Daria Hamrah

Home	Away	Goalkeeper 1	Goalkeeper 2

== Technical staff ==
=== Mehdi Tartar staff ===
Position	Staff
Head coach	(Iran) Mehdi Tartar
Assistant coach	(Iran) Karim Bagheri (Iran) Reza Jabbari (Iran) Alireza Mohammad (Iran) Vahid Fazeli
Goalkeeping coach	(Iran) Hossein Inanlou
Assistant Goalkeeping coach	(Iran) Javad Bagheri
Fitness Coach	(Greece) Kyriakos Giagou
Assistant Fitness Coach	(Iran) Keramat Safarpour (Iran) Siamak Tehrani
Analyzer	(Iran) Miaad Ghasemzadeh
Doctor	(Iran) Alireza Haghighat
Head of the medical committee	(Iran) Alireza Ghalyaei
Team Manager	(Iran) Mohsen Khalili
Media Officer	(Iran) Alireza Ashraf

== Players ==
=== First team ===
No.	Pos.	Nat.	Name	Age	Since	App.	Goals	Ends	Signed from	Notes
Goalkeepers
1	GK	(Iran)	Payam Niazmand	31	2025	34	0	2027	Sepahan	
22	GK	(Iran)	Amirreza Rafiei	23	2022	12	0	2027	Nassaji	U-25
95	GK	(Iran)	Mohammad Gandomi	20	2025	0	0	2028	Academy	U-21
Defenders
3	DF	(Iran)	Abolfazl Jalali	28	2026	7	0	2028	Esteghlal	
4	DF	(Iran)	Mohammadmehdi Zare	23	2026	13	0	2030	(Russia) Akhmat Grozny	
5	DF	(Iran)	Hossein Abarghouei	30	2025	25	0	2028	Kheybar	
6	DF	(Iran)	Hossein Kanaanizadegan	32	2023	163	14	2027	(Qatar) Al Ahli	Captain
20	DF	(Iran)	Majid Eydi	29	2026	13	1	2028	Gol Gohar	
33	DF	(Hungary)	Dániel Gera	30	2026	6	0	2027	(Hungary) Diósgyőri	
58	DF	(Iran)	Amirhossein Taheri	22	2026	0	0	2031	Nirooye Zamini	U-23
63	DF	(Iran)	Pouya Esmi	16	2026	1	0	—	Academy	U-17
74	DF	(Iran)	Alireza Homaeifard	20	2024	1	0	2028	Paykan	U-21
89	DF	(Iran)	Danial Eiri	22	2026	6	0	2030	Nassaji	U-23
Midfielders
8	MF	(Iran)	Mehdi Tikdari	30	2026	12	0	2028	Gol Gohar	
66	MF	(Iran)	Pouya Pourali	30	2026	13	0	2028	Gol Gohar	
77	MF	(Iran)	Mohammad Khodabandelou	26	2024	74	2	2028	Mes Rafsanjan	
80	MF	(Iran)	Yasin Salmani	24	2023	28	1	2027	Sepahan	U-25
88	MF	(Montenegro)	Marko Bakić	32	2025	21	1	2027	(Greece) OFI	
99	MF	(Iran)	Pouria Latififar	22	2026	7	0	2030	Gol Gohar	
Forwards
7	FW	(Iran)	Mohammad Omri	26	2021	74	7	2029	Academy	
9	FW	(Iran)	Ali Alipour	30	2024	289	98	2027	(Portugal) Gil Vicente	Vice Captain
10	FW	(Iran)	Mohammadmehdi Mohebi	26	2026	13	4	2029	(United Arab Emirates) Kalba	
11	FW	(Uzbekistan)	Igor Sergeev	33	2026	14	4	2028	(Uzbekistan) Pakhtakor	
21	FW	(Iran)	Pouria Shahrabadi	20	2026	13	2	2030	Gol Gohar	U-21
23	FW	(Republic of the Congo)	Thievy Bifouma	34	2025	27	5	2027	Esteghlal Khuzestan	
34	FW	(Iran)	Amirhossein Mahmoudi	20	2025	12	1	2029	Academy	U-21
45	FW	(Iran)	Mohammadhossein Sadeghi	22	2025	10	1	2029	Havadar	U-23
70	FW	(Uzbekistan)	Oston Urunov	25	2024	70	16	2027	(Uzbekistan) Navbahor	3rd Captain
Players left the club during the season
14	MF	(Iran)	Alireza Enayatzadeh	22	2023	11	1	2028	Academy	U-23
37	DF	(Iran)	Yaghoub Barajeh	20	2024	26	1	2028	Mes Kerman	U-21
90	MF	(Iran)	Kourosh Ezhdehakosh	19	2026	0	0	2031	Aluminium	U-20

Last updated: 20 November 2026.

== Transfers ==
=== In ===
Date	No.	Pos.	Nat.	Player	Moving from	Type	Fee	Source
Summer
30 June 2026	17	FW	(Iran)	Mojtaba Fakhrian	(Iran) Malavan	Loan return	—	
5 July 2026	8	MF	(Iran)	Mehdi Tikdari	(Iran) Gol Gohar	Transfer	Free	
7 July 2026	20	DF	(Iran)	Majid Eydi	(Iran) Gol Gohar	Transfer	Free	
9 July 2026	21	FW	(Iran)	Pouria Shahrabadi	(Iran) Gol Gohar	Transfer	€400,000	
10 July 2026	3	DF	(Iran)	Abolfazl Jalali	(Iran) Esteghlal	Transfer	Free	
16 July 2026	4	DF	(Iran)	Mohammadmehdi Zare	(Russia) Akhmat Grozny	Transfer	€800,000	
16 July 2026	66	MF	(Iran)	Pouya Pourali	(Iran) Gol Gohar	Transfer	Free	
25 July 2026	99	MF	(Iran)	Pouria Latififar	(Iran) Gol Gohar	Transfer	€463,000	
28 July 2026	10	FW	(Iran)	Mohammadmehdi Mohebi	(United Arab Emirates) Kalba	Transfer	€350,000	
8 August 2026	90	MF	(Iran)	Kourosh Ezhdehakosh	(Iran) Aluminium	Transfer	€100,000	
8 August 2026	58	DF	(Iran)	Amirhossein Taheri	(Iran) Nirooye Zamini	Transfer	Free	
17 August 2026	89	DF	(Iran)	Danial Eiri	(Iran) Nassaji	Transfer	€600,000	

Total spending: ▼€2,713,000

=== Out ===
Date	No.	Pos.	Nat.	Player	Moving to	Type	Fee	Source
Summer
1 July 2026	7	MF	(Iran)	Soroush Rafiei	Unattached	End of contract	—	
1 July 2026	18	FW	(Iran)	Abolfazl Babaei	Unattached	End of contract	—	
11 July 2026	17	FW	(Iran)	Mojtaba Fakhrian	(Iran) Gol Gohar	Loan	—	
11 July 2026	10	MF	(Iran)	Milad Sarlak	(Iran) Foolad	Transfer	Free	
12 July 2026	76	DF	(Iran)	Soheil Sahraei	(Iran) Gol Gohar	Transfer	Free	
19 July 2026	4	DF	(Iran)	Milad Mohammadi	(Belarus) Maxline Vitebsk	Transfer	Free	
27 July 2026	69	FW	(Iran)	Mohammadamin Kazemian	(Iran) Gol Gohar	Transfer	€139,000	
5 August 2026	2	FW	(Iran)	Omid Alishah	(Iran) Gol Gohar	Transfer	Free	
6 August 2026	20	DF	(Iran)	Farzin Moamelegari	(Iran) Malavan	Loan	—	
8 August 2026	81	MF	(Iran)	Reza Shekari	(Iran) Paykan	Transfer	Free	
10 August 2026	8	DF	(Iran)	Morteza Pouraliganji	(Uzbekistan) Pakhtakor	Transfer	Free	
17 August 2026	14	MF	(Iran)	Alireza Enayatzadeh	(Iran) Mes Shahr-e Babak	Loan	—	
26 August 2026	37	DF	(Iran)	Yaghoub Barajeh	(Iran) Nassaji	Loan	—	
26 August 2026	90	MF	(Iran)	Kourosh Ezhdehakosh	(Iran) Nassaji	Loan	—	

Total income: ▲€139,000
Balance: ▼€2,574,000

== Pre-season and friendlies ==
Win Draw Loss Fixtures

13 July 2026 Friendly	Persepolis	3–0	Shohadaye Razakan	Tehran
17:30 IRST (UTC+03:30)	Omri; Tikdari; Mirshafieian	Report		Stadium: Azadi Stadium No. 3

21 July 2026 Friendly	Persepolis	2–0	Kheybar	Tehran
17:30 IRST (UTC+03:30)	Tikdari; Sergeev	Report	Zarouni (red card)	Stadium: Azadi Stadium No. 3

26 July 2026 Friendly	Persepolis (Iran)	1–0	(Egypt) Pyramids	Erzurum, Turkey
17:30 IRST (UTC+03:30)	Bifouma 86'	Report		Stadium: Erzurum Camp

30 July 2026 Friendly	Alanyaspor (Turkey)	0–1	(Iran) Persepolis	Erzurum, Turkey
17:30 IRST (UTC+03:30)		Report	Alipour 90'	Stadium: Erzurum Camp

2 August 2026 Friendly	Erzurumspor (Turkey)	0–6	(Iran) Persepolis	Erzurum, Turkey
18:00 IRST (UTC+03:30)		Report	Homaeifard 14'; Shahrabadi 26', 72'; Sadeghi 39'; Bifouma 43'; Mahmoudi 52'	Stadium: Erzurum Camp

8 August 2026 Friendly	Persepolis	1–1	Aluminium	Tehran
17:00 IRST (UTC+03:30)	Alipour 31' (pen.)	Report	Kahrizi 55'	Stadium: Azadi Stadium No. 3

9 August 2026 Friendly	Persepolis	11–0	Montakhab Karaj	Tehran
17:00 IRST (UTC+03:30)	Sergeev; Salmani; Mahmoudi; Homaeifard; Tikdari; Shahrabadi	Report		Stadium: Azadi Stadium No. 3

20 August 2026 Friendly	Persepolis	4–2	Ario Eslamshahr	Tehran
17:30 IRST (UTC+03:30)	Mahmoudi 32'; Tikdari 79' (pen.); Shahrabadi 87'; Sadeghi 90+2'	Report		Stadium: Azadi Stadium No. 3

25 August 2026 Friendly	Persepolis	2–0	Persepolis U-23	Tehran
17:15 IRST (UTC+03:30)	Shahrabadi 71'; Sergeev 86'	Report		Stadium: Azadi Stadium No. 3

3 September 2026 Friendly	Persepolis	1–0	Mes Rafsanjan	Tehran
17:00 IRST (UTC+03:30)	Latififar 65'	Report		Stadium: Azadi Stadium No. 3

8 September 2026 Friendly	Persepolis	1–2	Pars Jonoubi	Tehran
16:00 IRST (UTC+03:30)	Salmani	Report	Zare; Delfi	Stadium: Azadi Stadium No. 3

13 September 2026 Friendly	Persepolis	4–0	Shahid Ghandi	Tehran
16:00 IRST (UTC+03:30)	Tikdari 27'; Salmani 59' (pen.); Zarei 70'; Eydi 85'	Report		Stadium: Azadi Stadium No. 3

25 September 2026 Friendly	Persepolis	0–1	Chadormalou	Tehran
17:00 IRST (UTC+03:30)		Report	Asadi	Stadium: Azadi Stadium No. 3

2 October 2026 Friendly	Persepolis	2–0	Gol Gohar	Tehran
16:15 IRST (UTC+03:30)	Mohebi 39'; Sadeghi 66'	Report		Stadium: Azadi Stadium No. 3

10 October 2026 Friendly	Persepolis	3–0	Foolad Hormozgan	Tehran
16:15 IRST (UTC+03:30)	Gera; Urunov; Shahrabadi	Report		Stadium: Shahid Kazemi Stadium

26 October 2026 Friendly	Persepolis	8–0	Setaregan Alborz	Tehran
15:00 IRST (UTC+03:30)	Sergeev; Mahmoudi; Cheshmberah; Bakić	Report		Stadium: Shahid Kazemi Stadium

13 November 2026 Friendly	Persepolis	2–1	Iran U-20	Tehran
14:30 IRST (UTC+03:30)	Eiri 57'; Tikdari 70' (pen.)	Report	Cheshmberah 10'	Stadium: Iran National Football Camp

21 November 2026 Friendly	Persepolis	7–0	KIA	Tehran
	Mirshafieian; Sergeev; Mahmoudi; Sadeghi; Salmani	Report		Stadium: Shahid Kazemi Stadium

== Competitions ==
=== Overview ===
Competition	First match	Last match	Record							
Competition	First match	Last match	Pld	W	D	L	GF	GA	GD	Win %
PGPL	15 August 2026		13	8	2	3	23	7	+16	61.54
Hazfi Cup			0	0	0	0	0	0	+0	—
Total			13	8	2	3	23	7	+16	61.54

Last updated: 20 November 2026
Source: Competitions

=== Persian Gulf Pro League ===
==== League Table ====
Pos	Team	Pld	W	D	L	GF	GA	GD	Pts	Qualification or relegation
1	Sepahan	12	8	2	2	23	7	+16	26	Qualification for the 2027–28 AFC Champions League Elite league stage
2	Persepolis	12	7	2	3	20	7	+13	23	Qualification for the 2027–28 AFC Champions League Elite league stage
3	Foolad	12	6	5	1	12	6	+6	23	Qualification for the 2027–28 AFC Champions League Elite league stage
4	Esteghlal	10	5	5	0	12	3	+9	20	Qualification for the 2027–28 AFC Champions League Two group stage
5	Tractor	10	6	2	2	12	5	+7	20	

Updated to match(es) played on 6 November 2026. Source: Iran Football League Organization - League Full Table
Rules for classification: 1) Points; 2) Head-to-head points; 3) Head-to-head goal difference; 4) Total goal difference; 5) Total goals scored; 6) Fair-play points.
(Note: Head-to-head record is used only after all the matches between the teams in question have been played).

==== Results summary ====
Overall								Home						Away					
Pld	W	D	L	GF	GA	GD	Pts	W	D	L	GF	GA	GD	W	D	L	GF	GA	GD
13	8	2	3	23	7	+16	26	5	0	2	16	5	+11	3	2	1	7	2	+5

==== Results by round ====
Round	1	2	3	4	5	6	8	7^{1}	9	10	11	12	13	14	15	16	17	18	19	20	21	22	23	24	25	26	27	28	29	30	31	32	33	34
Ground	A	H	A	H	A	H	H	A	A	H	A	H	H	A	H	A	H	H	A	H	A	H	A	H	A	H	A	H	A	A	H	A	H	A
Result	W	W	L	W	D	W	W	D	W	L	W	L	W																					
Position	3	1	5	3	4	2	2	1	1	1	1	2	2																					
Points	3	6	6	9	10	13	16	17	20	20	23	23	26																					

Updated to match(es) played on 20 November 2026. Source: "iranleague".
A = Away; H = Home; W = Win; D = Draw; L = Loss

^{1} Matchday 7 (vs Kheybar) was postponed due to the Iran national U-23 football team's involvement in the Asian Games.

==== Matches ====
Win Draw Loss Postponed

15 August 2026 1	Shams Azar	0–2	Persepolis	Qazvin
19:30 IRST (UTC+03:30)	Moazami Goudarzi (yellow card) 27'; Rezaei (yellow card) 38'	Report	Mohebi 10'; Omri 15'	Stadium: Sardar-e Azadegan Stadium; Attendance: 8,000; Referee: Bijan Heydari

19 August 2026 2	Persepolis	4–1	Esteghlal Khuzestan	Qods
19:30 IRST (UTC+03:30)	Khodabandelou 6'; Alipour 20'; Sergeev 48'; Kanaanizadegan (yellow card) 69'; Shahrabadi 90+3'; Bakić (yellow card) 90+5'; Bifouma (yellow card) 90+8'	Report	Niazmand 64' (o.g.); Mohammadi Farhani (yellow card) 83'	Stadium: Shohada-ye Shahr-e Qods Stadium; Referee: Hassan Akrami

23 August 2026 3	Tractor	1–0	Persepolis	Tabriz
18:30 IRST (UTC+03:30)	Moghanlou (yellow card) 24'; Štrkalj 90'	Report		Stadium: Yadegar-e Emam Stadium; Attendance: 0 Referee: Amir Arab Baraghi

29 August 2026 4	Persepolis	3–0	Malavan	Qods
19:15 IRST (UTC+03:30)	Papi 20' (o.g.); Khodabandelou (yellow card) 30'; Bifouma 34'; Alipour 56'	Report	Jafari (yellow card) 42'; Shahriari (red card) 70'	Stadium: Shohada-ye Shahr-e Qods Stadium; Referee: Seyed Reza Mahdavi

2 September 2026 5	Esteghlal	1–1	Persepolis	Isfahan
19:30 IRST (UTC+03:30)	Razzaghinia (yellow card) 40'; Asani 60'; Goudarzi (yellow card) 77'	Report	Mohebi 50'; Tikdari (yellow card) 74'; Khodabandelou (yellow card) 87'	Stadium: Naghsh-e Jahan Stadium; Attendance: 50,000; Referee: Mooud Bonyadifard

7 September 2026 6	Persepolis	2–0	Zob Ahan	Qods
19:00 IRST (UTC+03:30)	Alipour 42'; Shahrabadi 64'	Report	Ghaderi (yellow card) 28'; Mokhtari (yellow card) 79'	Stadium: Shohada-ye Shahr-e Qods Stadium; Referee: Meysam Heydari

9 October 2026 8	Persepolis	3–1	Sanat Naft	Qods
17:00 IRST (UTC+03:30)	Bifouma 5'; Alipour 53' (pen.); Urunov 85'	Report	Fakhreddini (yellow card) 45+4'; Baseri 66'	Stadium: Shohada-ye Shahr-e Qods Stadium; Referee: Ahmad Mohammadi

14 October 2026 7	Kheybar	0–0	Persepolis	Khorramabad
17:00 IRST (UTC+03:30)	Maleki (yellow card) 90+4'	Report	Salmani (yellow card) 83'	Stadium: Takhti Stadium; Referee: Bijan Heydari
Note: The match was originally scheduled for 13 September 2026, but was postponed due to the Iran national U-23 football team's involvement in the Asian Games.

19 October 2026 9	Mes Shahr-e Babak	0–3	Persepolis	Shahr-e Babak
15:30 IRST (UTC+03:30)	Tarhani (red card) 21'	Report	Tikdari (yellow card) 27'; Bifouma 33'; Alipour (penalty missed) 68'; Eydi 74'; Sadeghi 90+3'	Stadium: Shahid Soleimani Stadium; Referee: Koopal Nazemi

25 October 2026 10	Persepolis	0–1	Foolad	Qods
16:45 IRST (UTC+03:30)	Shahrabadi (yellow card) 19'	Report	Akbarzadeh (yellow card) 53'; Amiri 87'; Zadehattar (yellow card) 90+2'	Stadium: Shohada-ye Shahr-e Qods Stadium; Referee: Amir Arab Baraghi

31 October 2026 11	Nassaji	0–1	Persepolis	Qaem Shahr
16:30 IRST (UTC+03:30)	Hosseinzadehfard (yellow card) 45'; Arasteh (yellow card) 61'	Report	Tikdari (yellow card) 53'; Mohebi 58', (yellow card) 68'; Zare (yellow card) 90+5'	Stadium: Vatani Stadium; Referee: Seyed Reza Mahdavi

6 November 2026 12	Persepolis	1–2	Fajr Sepasi	Qods
16:30 IRST (UTC+03:30)	Rigi 69' (o.g.); Bifouma (yellow card) 79'; Mahmoudi (yellow card) 85'	Report	Pahlavan 15'; Moredi (yellow card) 32', (goal) 59'; Nasiri (yellow card) 37'	Stadium: Shohada-ye Shahr-e Qods Stadium; Referee: Vahid Zamani

20 November 2026 13	Persepolis	3–0	Paykan	Qods
16:15 IRST (UTC+03:30)	Bifouma (yellow card) 35', (goal) 39'; Mohebi (yellow card) 34', (goal) 52'; Latififar (yellow card) 59'; Alipour 72'	Report	Bagheri (yellow card) 34'	Stadium: Shohada-ye Shahr-e Qods Stadium; Referee: Morteza Mansourian

27 November 2026 14	Aluminium	v	Persepolis	Arak
16:15 IRST (UTC+03:30)				Stadium: Imam Khomeini Stadium

4 December 2026 15	Persepolis	v	Sepahan	Qods
16:15 IRST (UTC+03:30)				Stadium: Shohada-ye Shahr-e Qods Stadium

19 December 2026 16	Gol Gohar	v	Persepolis	Sirjan
16:15 IRST (UTC+03:30)				Stadium: Shahid Soleimani Stadium

25 December 2026 17	Persepolis	v	Chadormalou	Qods
16:15 IRST (UTC+03:30)				Stadium: Shohada-ye Shahr-e Qods Stadium

==== Score overview ====
Win Draw Loss

Opposition	Home score	Away score	Aggregate score
Aluminium			
Chadormalou			
Esteghlal		1–1	
Esteghlal Khuzestan	4–1		
Fajr Sepasi	1–2		
Foolad	0–1		
Gol Gohar			
Kheybar		0–0	
Malavan	3–0		
Mes Shahr-e Babak		3–0	
Nassaji		1–0	
Paykan	3–0		
Sanat Naft	3–1		
Sepahan			
Shams Azar		2–0	
Tractor		0–1	
Zob Ahan	2–0		

== Statistics ==
=== Overall ===
No.	Pos.	Nat.	Name	PGPL		Hazfi Cup		Total	
No.	Pos.	Nat.	Name	Apps	Goals	Apps	Goals	Apps	Goals
Goalkeepers
1	GK	(Iran)	Payam Niazmand	13	0	0	0	13	0
22	GK	(Iran)	Amirreza Rafiei	0	0	0	0	0	0
95	GK	(Iran)	Mohammad Gandomi	0	0	0	0	0	0
Defenders
3	DF	(Iran)	Abolfazl Jalali	2 (5)	0	0	0	2 (5)	0
4	DF	(Iran)	Mohammadmehdi Zare	12 (1)	0	0	0	12 (1)	0
5	DF	(Iran)	Hossein Abarghouei	4 (1)	0	0	0	4 (1)	0
6	DF	(Iran)	Hossein Kanaanizadegan	7	0	0	0	7	0
20	DF	(Iran)	Majid Eydi	13	1	0	0	13	1
33	DF	(Hungary)	Dániel Gera	0	0	0	0	0	0
58	DF	(Iran)	Amirhossein Taheri	0	0	0	0	0	0
63	DF	(Iran)	Pouya Esmi	(1)	0	0	0	(1)	0
74	DF	(Iran)	Alireza Homaeifard	(1)	0	0	0	(1)	0
89	DF	(Iran)	Danial Eiri	3 (3)	0	0	0	3 (3)	0
Midfielders
8	MF	(Iran)	Mehdi Tikdari	11 (1)	0	0	0	11 (1)	0
66	MF	(Iran)	Pouya Pourali	12 (1)	0	0	0	12 (1)	0
77	MF	(Iran)	Mohammad Khodabandelou	10 (1)	1	0	0	10 (1)	1
80	MF	(Iran)	Yasin Salmani	(5)	0	0	0	(5)	0
88	MF	(Montenegro)	Marko Bakić	(3)	0	0	0	(3)	0
99	MF	(Iran)	Pouria Latififar	5 (2)	0	0	0	5 (2)	0
Forwards
7	FW	(Iran)	Mohammad Omri	6 (3)	1	0	0	6 (3)	1
9	FW	(Iran)	Ali Alipour	11 (2)	5	0	0	11 (2)	5
10	FW	(Iran)	Mohammadmehdi Mohebi	13	4	0	0	13	4
11	FW	(Uzbekistan)	Igor Sergeev	6 (2)	1	0	0	6 (2)	1
21	FW	(Iran)	Pouria Shahrabadi	2 (11)	2	0	0	2 (11)	2
23	FW	(Republic of the Congo)	Thievy Bifouma	10 (3)	4	0	0	10 (3)	4
34	FW	(Iran)	Amirhossein Mahmoudi	(7)	0	0	0	(7)	0
45	FW	(Iran)	Mohammadhossein Sadeghi	(4)	1	0	0	(4)	1
70	FW	(Uzbekistan)	Oston Urunov	3 (6)	1	0	0	3 (6)	1
Players left the club during the season
14	MF	(Iran)	Alireza Enayatzadeh	0	0	0	0	0	0
37	DF	(Iran)	Yaghoub Barajeh	0	0	0	0	0	0
90	MF	(Iran)	Kourosh Ezhdehakosh	0	0	0	0	0	0
Updated: 20 November 2026

=== Goal scorers ===
Rank	No.	Pos.	Nat.	Name	PGPL	Hazfi Cup	Total
1	9	FW	(Iran)	Ali Alipour	5	0	5
2	10	FW	(Iran)	Mohammadmehdi Mohebi	4	0	4
2	23	FW	(Republic of the Congo)	Thievy Bifouma	4	0	4
4	21	FW	(Iran)	Pouria Shahrabadi	2	0	2
5	7	FW	(Iran)	Mohammad Omri	1	0	1
5	11	FW	(Uzbekistan)	Igor Sergeev	1	0	1
5	20	DF	(Iran)	Majid Eydi	1	0	1
5	45	FW	(Iran)	Mohammadhossein Sadeghi	1	0	1
5	70	FW	(Uzbekistan)	Oston Urunov	1	0	1
5	77	MF	(Iran)	Mohammad Khodabandelou	1	0	1
Own goal					2	0	2
Totals					23	0	23
Updated: 20 November 2026

=== Assists ===
Rank	No.	Pos.	Nat.	Name	PGPL	Hazfi Cup	Total
1	9	FW	(Iran)	Ali Alipour	3	0	3
1	20	DF	(Iran)	Majid Eydi	3	0	3
3	10	FW	(Iran)	Mohammadmehdi Mohebi	2	0	2
3	23	FW	(Republic of the Congo)	Thievy Bifouma	2	0	2
5	3	DF	(Iran)	Abolfazl Jalali	1	0	1
5	7	FW	(Iran)	Mohammad Omri	1	0	1
5	11	FW	(Uzbekistan)	Igor Sergeev	1	0	1
5	21	FW	(Iran)	Pouria Shahrabadi	1	0	1
5	70	FW	(Uzbekistan)	Oston Urunov	1	0	1
5	77	MF	(Iran)	Mohammad Khodabandelou	1	0	1
Totals					16	0	16
Updated: 20 November 2026

=== Goalkeeping ===
Rank	No.	Nat.	Name	PGPL			Hazfi Cup			Total		
Rank	No.	Nat.	Name	Apps	GA	CS	Apps	GA	CS	Apps	GA	CS
1	1	(Iran)	Payam Niazmand	13	7	7	0	0	0	13	7	7
2	22	(Iran)	Amirreza Rafiei	0	0	0	0	0	0	0	0	0
2	95	(Iran)	Mohammad Gandomi	0	0	0	0	0	0	0	0	0
Totals				13	7	7	0	0	0	13	7	7
Updated: 20 November 2026

=== Captains ===
Note: Numbers in parentheses indicate the number of times a player served as captain after the fixed captain was substituted.

Rank	No.	Pos.	Nat.	Name	PGPL	Hazfi Cup	Total
1	6	DF	(Iran)	Hossein Kanaanizadegan	7	0	7
2	9	FW	(Iran)	Ali Alipour	4 (4)	0	4 (4)
3	1	GK	(Iran)	Payam Niazmand	2 (4)	0	2 (4)
Totals					13 (8)	0	13 (8)
Updated: 20 November 2026

=== Disciplinary record ===
No.	Pos.	Nat.	Player	PGPL			Hazfi Cup			Total		
No.	Pos.	Nat.	Player	Yellow card	(yellow card) (yellow-red card)	Red card	Yellow card	(yellow card) (yellow-red card)	Red card	Yellow card	(yellow card) (yellow-red card)	Red card
4	DF	(Iran)	Mohammadmehdi Zare	1	‌ ‌ ‌ 0 ‌ ‌ ‌	‌ 0 ‌	‌ 0 ‌	‌ ‌ ‌ 0 ‌ ‌ ‌	‌ 0 ‌	1	‌ ‌ ‌ 0 ‌ ‌ ‌	‌ 0 ‌
6	DF	(Iran)	Hossein Kanaanizadegan	1	0	0	0	0	0	1	0	0
8	MF	(Iran)	Mehdi Tikdari	3	0	0	0	0	0	3	0	0
10	FW	(Iran)	Mohammadmehdi Mohebi	2	0	0	0	0	0	2	0	0
21	FW	(Iran)	Pouria Shahrabadi	1	0	0	0	0	0	1	0	0
23	FW	(Republic of the Congo)	Thievy Bifouma	3	0	0	0	0	0	3	0	0
34	FW	(Iran)	Amirhossein Mahmoudi	1	0	0	0	0	0	1	0	0
77	MF	(Iran)	Mohammad Khodabandelou	2	0	0	0	0	0	2	0	0
80	MF	(Iran)	Yasin Salmani	1	0	0	0	0	0	1	0	0
88	MF	(Montenegro)	Marko Bakić	1	0	0	0	0	0	1	0	0
99	MF	(Iran)	Pouria Latififar	1	0	0	0	0	0	1	0	0
Head coach		(Iran)	Mehdi Tartar	1	0	0	0	0	0	1	0	0
Coach		(Iran)	Alireza Mohammad	1	0	0	0	0	0	1	0	0
Manager		(Iran)	Mohsen Khalili	0	0	1	0	0	0	0	0	1
Totals				19	0	1	0	0	0	19	0	1
Updated: 20 November 2026

Ordered by (red card) , (second yellow card) and (yellow card)
(yellow card) = Number of bookings; (second yellow card) = Number of sending offs after a second yellow card; (red card) = Number of sending offs by a direct red card.
