= Pouya Pourali =

Iranian professional footballer

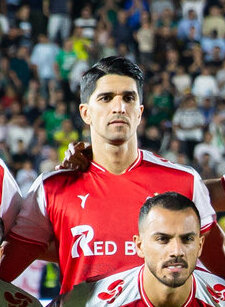
- Pourali with Persepolis in 2026

Personal information
- Full name: Pouya Pourali Roudbari
- Date of birth: 22 March 1996 (age 30)
- Place of birth: Bahnemir, Iran
- Height: 1.82 m (5 ft 11 1/2 in)
- Position: Midfielder

Team information
- Current team: Persepolis
- Number: 66

Youth career
- 2011–2012: Padideh Sari
- 2012–2014: Shahrdari Juybar
- 2014–2015: Khoneh Be Khoneh

Senior career*
Years	Team	Apps	(Gls)
2015–2017	Khoneh Be Khoneh	6	(0)
2017–2018	Baadraan	1	(0)
2018–2019	Khoneh Be Khoneh	20	(0)
2019–2021	Fajr Sepasi	23	(1)
2021–2023	Zob Ahan	43	(0)
2023–2024	Malavan	25	(1)
2024–2025	Tractor	7	(0)
2025–2026	Gol Gohar	21	(1)
2026–	Persepolis	13	(0)
- * Club domestic league appearances and goals as of 20 November 2026

Pouya Pourali Roudbari (Persian: پویا پورعلی; born 22 March 1996) is an Iranian professional football player who plays as a Midfielder for Persian Gulf Pro League club Persepolis. He also has a history of playing for Khoneh Be Khoneh, Baadraan and Fajr Sepasi.

He played his first game in the Pro League in the first week of the Iranian Football Pro League 2021-22 against Sanat Naft Abadan in the starting lineup.

In addition to the position of defensive midfielder, this player also has the ability to play in the positions of central midfielder, winger, right back and central defender.

== Club career ==
=== Early career ===
Pouya Pourali started his football career with the youth of Padideh Sari Club and with this team became the champion of the National Youth Regions League in 2011. He later joined to the Shahrdari Juybar Club and with this team in 2012 became the champion of Mazandaran Province Youth.

=== Baadran ===
Pourali joined the Khoneh Be Khoneh Babol team in 2015, and after spending two seasons, he left the club and join to Baadran. In Baadraan, he played only one game and the next season he went to the Khoneh Be Khoneh club again.

=== Khoneh Be Khoneh F.C. ===
Pourali joined Khoneh Be Khoneh in 2018. During one year at the club, he managed to play 19 games (1,696 minutes).

=== Fajr Sepasi Shiraz F.C. ===
In 2019, Pourali joined Fajr Sepasi Shiraz to perform his military service and managed to score 1 goal in 22 games (1,980 minutes) for this team in the Azadegan League. And in the 2020–21 season, won the Azadegan League with this team and succeeded in advancing to the Pro League.

=== Zob Ahan Esfahan F.C. ===
In 2021, Pouya Pourali joined the Zob Ahan Football Club team under the direct supervision of the head coach, Mehdi Tartar, and played 10 games in the Hazfi Cup and Pro League for this team until the middle of the season.

=== Persepolis ===
On 16 July 2026, Pourali joined Persian Gulf Pro League side Persepolis on a two-year deal.

== Career statistics ==
=== Club ===
As of 20 November 2026

Club	Season	League			Cup		Continental		Other		Total	
Club	Season	Division	Apps	Goals	Apps	Goals	Apps	Goals	Apps	Goals	Apps	Goals
Persepolis	2026–27	Pro League	13	0	0	0	—		—		13	0
Persepolis	Total		13	0	0	0	—		—		13	0

== Honours ==
=== Padideh Sari ===
- Youth Regions League: 2011

=== Shahrdari Juybar ===
- Mazandaran Province Youth League: 2012

=== Khoneh Be Khoneh ===
- First Division Youth League: 2014
- Youth Azadegan League: 2015-16
- Youth Pro League: 2016–17

=== Fajr Sepasi ===
- Azadegan League: 2020–21

Tractor

- Persian Gulf Pro League: 2024–25
