= 2026–27 Hazfi Cup =

40th season of the Iranian football knockout competition

Iranian Knockout Cup

Tournament details
- Country: Iran
- Dates: 29 November 2026 – TBD
- Teams: 82
- All statistics correct as of 21 November 2026.

The 2026–27 Hazfi Cup is the 40th season of the Iranian football knockout cup. The competition had initially been cancelled due to calendar congestion, but following the postponement of the 2027 AFC Asian Cup, the Football Federation decided to hold it.

== Background ==
In the 2025–26 season, the Hazfi Cup was played up to the round of 16, but due to wartime conditions and the suspension of competitions, the remainder of the tournament was cancelled and no champion was crowned.

For the 2026–27 season, the League Organization initially announced that the Hazfi Cup would not be held, citing calendar congestion, the expansion of the Persian Gulf Pro League to 18 teams, the Olympic team's participation in the Nagoya Asian Games, the 2027 AFC Asian Cup, and Asian club competitions. Esteghlal also proposed holding the remaining matches of the previous season or scheduling a new season, which was not accepted at the time.

After the 2027 AFC Asian Cup was postponed due to wartime conditions and insecurity in host Saudi Arabia, the necessary calendar space became available, and Mehdi Taj, president of the Football Federation, issued a letter to the League Organization ordering the competition's return to the calendar. The tournament will begin on 29 November 2026 with the preliminary rounds.

== Teams ==
The teams participating in this competition are divided into four main groups: Pro League, Azadegan League, Second Division, and provincial leagues.

Persian Gulf Pro League; All 18 teams in the 2026–27 season (Note: Enter the competition in the round of 32)	Azadegan League; All 16 teams in the 2026–27 season (Note: Enter the competition in the third round)	2nd Division League; All 28 teams in the 2026–27 season (Note: Enter the competition in the second round)	Provincial Leagues champions, 3rd and 4th Division League clubs 20 teams (Note: Enter the competition in the first round)
Aluminium Arak; Esteghlal; Esteghlal Khuzestan; Persepolis; Paykan; Tractor; Chadormalou Ardakan; Kheybar Khorramabad; Zob Ahan; Sepahan; Shams Azar; Sanat Naft Abadan; Fajr Sepasi; Foolad; Gol Gohar; Mes Shahr-e Babak; Malavan; Nassaji	Ario Eslamshahr; Beasat Kermanshah; Pars Jonoubi Jam; Palayesh Naft Bandar Abbas; Qeshm Island; Saipa; Shahin Bandar Ameri; Fard Alborz; Foolad B; Kara Gostar Shabestar; Mes Rafsanjan; Mes Kerman; Naft Masjed Soleyman; Naft va Gaz Gachsaran; Nirooye Zamini; Havadar	Ako Mode Ardabil; Aseman Golestan; Esteghlal Zahedan; Iranjavan Bushehr; Bargh Shiraz; Parvaz Simorgh; Pishtazan Sanat Babol; Chooka Talesh; Damash Gilan; Dena Yasuj; Zob Ahan B; Rakhsh Khodro Tabriz; Rezvani Esfahan; Sepahan Novin; Sepidrood; Shahin Tehran; Shayan Diesel; Shahr Arka Alborz; Shahrdari Mahshahr; Shahrvand Bandar Abbas; Shahid Ghandi; Fajr Qazvin; Foolad Hormozgan; Keshavarz Robat Karim; Malavan Bushehr; Naft Ahvaz; Naft va Gaz Ilam; Navad Urmia	Aramesh Mashhad; Ettehad Safein Kish; Ehsan Shahr-e Rey; Ersi Marand; Esteghlal Javan Sonqor; Esteghlal Javan Susangerd; Parsian Maaden Zagros; Parseh Lordegan; Paykan Novin Bojnord; Torkan Zanjan; Ronahi Urmia; Setareh Khanaqah Meybod; Shahrdari Qaleh Mombi; Talaeipoushan Shahrud; Toofan Kukherd Hormozgan; Oghab Zahedan; Fath Mehran; Keshavarz Bagherabad Mahallat; MKN Galugah; Kurdistan representative

== First round ==
The draw for this round was held on 21 November 2026. Twenty teams participate in the first round, with the 10 winners advancing to face the 2nd Division League teams in the next round.

Number of teams per tier entering this round
Pro League	Azadegan League	2nd Division League	Provincial leagues, 3rd and 4th Division League	Total
0 / 18	0 / 16	0 / 28	20 / 20	20 / 82

29 November 2026	MKN Galugah (4)	v	Paykan Novin Bojnord (4)	Galugah
				Stadium: Shahid Sineh Sepehr Stadium

29 November 2026	Talaeipoushan Shahrud (4)	v	Aramesh Mashhad (4)	Shahrud
				Stadium: Shahrud Azad University Stadium

29 November 2026	Ersi Marand (4)	v	Torkan Zanjan (4)	Marand
				Stadium: Takhti Marand Stadium

29 November 2026	Ehsan Shahr-e Rey (4)	v	Keshavarz Bagherabad Mahallat (4)	Rey
				Stadium: Shahr-e Salem 2 Stadium

30 November 2026	Kurdistan representative (4)	v	Ronahi Urmia (4)

30 November 2026	Shahrdari Qaleh Mombi (4)	v	Esteghlal Javan Susangerd (4)	Qaleh Mombi
				Stadium: Shahid Rajai Bahmai Stadium

30 November 2026	Parsian Maaden Zagros (4)	v	Parseh Lordegan (4)	Shahinshahr
				Stadium: Mellat Stadium

30 November 2026	Oghab Zahedan (4)	v	Setareh Khanaqah Meybod (4)	Zahedan
				Stadium: Alghadir Zahedan Stadium

30 November 2026	Toofan Kukherd Hormozgan (4)	v	Ettehad Safein Kish (4)	Bastak
				Stadium: Takhti Bastak Stadium

30 November 2026	Esteghlal Javan Sonqor (4)	v	Fath Mehran (4)	Sonqor
				Stadium: Takhti Sonqor Stadium
