= Hossein Abarghouei =

Iranian footballer

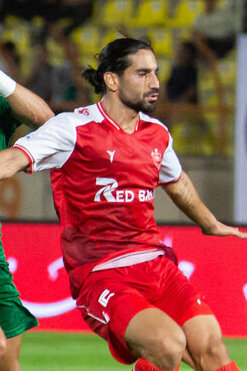

Personal information
- Full name: Mohammad Hossein Abarghouei
- Date of birth: July 8, 1996 (age 30)
- Place of birth: Tehran, Iran
- Height: 1.84 m (6 ft 1/2 in)
- Position: Defender

Team information
- Current team: Persepolis
- Number: 5

Youth career
- 2013–2014: Persepolis
- 2014–2015: Saba Qom
- 2015–2016: Parseh Tehran
- 2016: Kimiya Farayand
- 2016–2017: Esteghlal

Senior career*
Years	Team	Apps	(Gls)
2017–2018	Gostaresh Foulad	2	(0)
2018–2019	Machine Sazi	4	(0)
2019–2021	Oghab Teheran	16	(1)
2021–2022	Vista Turbine	25	(3)
2022–2023	Shams Azar	24	(1)
2023–2025	Kheybar Khorramabad	58	(2)
2025–	Persepolis	23	(0)

International career^{‡}
2025	Iran	1	(0)
- * Club domestic league appearances and goals as of 20 November 2026 ‡ National team caps and goals as of 10 October 2025

Hossein Abarghouei (Persian: حسین ابرقویی; born 8 July 1996) is an Iranian football midfielder who currently plays for Iranian football club Persepolis in Persian Gulf Pro League and the Iran national team.

== Club career ==
Abarghouei started his career with Parseh Tehran's academy, before moving to Esteghlal's academy in 2016.

He started his senior career in 2017 with Gostaresh Foulad, in Persian Gulf Pro League.

In 2011, Abarghouei moved to Oghab Teheran to complete his mandatory military service. Later he joined Vista Toorbin. On 25 July, he made his debut for the club in a 1–0 defeat against Khooshe Talaei in the Azadegan League.

On 16 July 2022, Abarghouei signed a contract with Shams Azar.

== Career statistics ==
=== Club ===
As of 20 November 2026

Club	Season	League			Cup		Continental		Other		Total	
Club	Season	Division	Apps	Goals	Apps	Goals	Apps	Goals	Apps	Goals	Apps	Goals
Persepolis	2025–26	Pro League	18	0	1	0	—		1	0	20	0
Persepolis	2026–27	Pro League	5	0	0	0	—		—		5	0
Persepolis	Total		23	0	1	0	—		1	0	25	0

== International career ==
He made his debut against Russia on 10 October 2025 in Friendly match.

=== International ===
As of match played 10 October 2025

Appearances and goals by national team and year
National team	Year	Apps	Goals
Iran
Iran	2025	1	0
Total		1	0
