= Mohammadhossein Sadeghi =

Iranian footballer

Personal information
- Full name: Mohammadhossein Sadeghi
- Date of birth: 29 March 2004 (age 22)
- Place of birth: Firuzabad, Fars, Iran
- Position: Left winger

Team information
- Current team: Persepolis
- Number: 45

Youth career
- –2022: Pars Jonoubi
- 2022–2023: Esteghlal

Senior career*
Years	Team	Apps	(Gls)
2023–2024	Pars Jonoubi	2	(0)
2024–2025	Havadar	17	(2)
2025–	Persepolis	10	(1)
- * Club domestic league appearances and goals as of 20 November 2026

Mohammadhossein Sadeghi (Persian: محمدحسین صادقی; born 29 March 2004) is an Iranian professional footballer who plays as a left winger for Persepolis in the Persian Gulf Pro League.

== Club career ==
Sadeghi began his senior career with Pars Jonoubi Jam before moving to Havadar in the Persian Gulf Pro League on 10 August 2024. He made his debut in the Persian Gulf Pro League on 20 January 2025 against Kheybar Khorramabad.

He scored his first professional goal on 30 March 2025 against Chadormalou.

In 2025, Sadeghi signed a contract with Persepolis for a reported fee of €320,000.

== Career statistics ==
As of 20 November 2026

Club	Division	Season	League		Hazfi Cup		Asia		Super Cup		Total	
Club	Division	Season	Apps	Goals	Apps	Goals	Apps	Goals	Apps	Goals	Apps	Goals
Persepolis	Persian Gulf Pro League	2025–26	6	0	0	0	–	–	–	–	6	0
Persepolis	Persian Gulf Pro League	2026–27	4	1	0	0	–	–	–	–	4	1
Persepolis	Total		10	1	0	0	–	–	–	–	10	1
Persepolis total			10	1	0	0	–	–	–	–	10	1
