= Mohammadmehdi Zare =

Iranian footballer (born 2003)

Mohammad Mehdi Zare
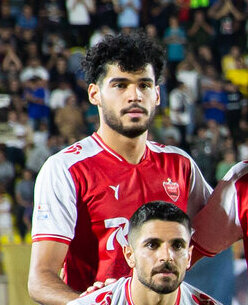
- Zare with Persepolis in 2026

Personal information
- Full name: Mohammad Mehdi Zare Mahzabiyeh
- Date of birth: 24 January 2003 (age 23)
- Place of birth: Shiraz, Iran
- Height: 1.92 m (6 ft 4 in)
- Position: Centre-back

Team information
- Current team: Persepolis
- Number: 4

Youth career
- Bargh Shiraz
- –2022: Khalij Fars
- 2022–2023: Esteghlal

Senior career*
Years	Team	Apps	(Gls)
2023–2024	Pars Jonoubi	15	(2)
2024–2025	Gol Gohar	23	(0)
2025–2026	Akhmat Grozny	9	(0)
2026–	Persepolis	13	(0)

International career
2024–	Iran	0	(0)
- * Club domestic league appearances and goals as of 20 November 2026

Mohammad Mehdi Zare Mahzabiyeh, known as Mohammad Mehdi Zare (Persian: محمدمهدی زارع مهذبیه; born 24 January 2003) is an Iranian football player who plays as a centre-back for Persian Gulf Pro League club Persepolis.

== Club career ==
On 22 July 2025, Zare signed a four-year contract with Russian Premier League club Akhmat Grozny. He joined Ousmane Ndong, who was Zare's teammate in the center of defense of Gol Gohar Sirjan in the previous season and signed with Akhmat one day earlier.

Zare made his RPL debut for Akhmat on 27 July 2025 in a game against CSKA Moscow.

On 16 July 2026, Zare returned to Iran and signed a four-year contract with Persepolis.

== Personal life ==
On 16 January 2026, just before their match against South Korea in the 2026 AFC U-23 Asian Cup, Zare, along with his entire team, refused to sing "Mehr-e Khavaran", the national anthem of the Islamic Republic of Iran, in solidarity with the 2025–2026 Iranian protests.

== Career statistics ==
As of 20 November 2026

Club	Season	League			Cup		Total	
Club	Season	Division	Apps	Goals	Apps	Goals	Apps	Goals
Pars Jonoubi	2023–24	Azadegan League	15	2	2	1	17	3
Gol Gohar	2024–25	Persian Gulf Pro League	23	0	2	0	25	0
Akhmat Grozny	2025–26	Russian Premier League	9	0	5	0	14	0
Persepolis	2026–27	Persian Gulf Pro League	13	0	0	0	13	0
Career total			60	2	9	1	69	3
