= Amir Mahmoudi =

Iranian footballer

Amirhossein Mahmoudi
Personal information
- Full name: Amirhossein Mahmoudi
- Date of birth: 12 July 2006 (age 20)
- Place of birth: Tehran, Iran
- Height: 1.87 m (6 ft 2 in)
- Position: Left winger

Team information
- Current team: Persepolis
- Number: 34

Youth career
- 2020–2025: Persepolis

Senior career*
Years	Team	Apps	(Gls)
2025–	Persepolis	12	(1)

International career^{‡}
2026–	Iran	5	(0)
- * Club domestic league appearances and goals as of 20 November 2026 ‡ National team caps and goals as of 29 September 2026

Amirhossein Mahmoudi (Persian: امیرحسین محمودی; born 12 July 2006) is an Iranian professional footballer who plays as a left winger for Persepolis in the Persian Gulf Pro League and the Iran national team.

== Club career ==
Mahmoudi began his football career in the youth academy of Persepolis. After becoming the top scorer of the Tehran U-19 Premier League in June 2025, he signed a professional contract with the senior team. He made his first-team debut in a match against Foolad in week 18 of the Persian Gulf Pro League on 28 January 2026. In his second appearance for Persepolis, against Chadormalou, he scored his first goal for the club in the 82nd minute, securing a victory for his team.

== International career ==
Mahmoudi received his first call-up to the Iran national team in 2026 and has earned 5 caps.

== Career statistics ==
As of 20 November 2026

Club	Division	Season	League		Hazfi Cup		Asia		Super Cup		Total	
Club	Division	Season	Apps	Goals	Apps	Goals	Apps	Goals	Apps	Goals	Apps	Goals
Persepolis	Persian Gulf Pro League	2025–26	5	1	0	0	–	–	–	–	5	1
Persepolis	Persian Gulf Pro League	2026–27	7	0	0	0	–	–	–	–	7	0
Total Persepolis			12	1	0	0	–	–	–	–	12	1

=== International ===
As of match played 29 September 2026

Iran
Year	Apps	Goals
2026	5	0
Total	5	0
