= Pouria Latififar =

Iranian footballer (born 2003)

Personal information
- Full name: Pouria Latififar
- Date of birth: 16 August 2003 (age 23)
- Place of birth: Qorveh, Iran
- Height: 1.85 m (6 ft 1 in)
- Position: Midfielder

Team information
- Current team: Persepolis
- Number: 99

Youth career
- 2022–2023: Moghavemat Tehran

Senior career*
Years	Team	Apps	(Gls)
2023–2026	Gol Gohar	45	(2)
2026–	Persepolis	7	(0)

International career
2025–	Iran U-23	7	(0)
- * Club domestic league appearances and goals as of 20 November 2026

Pouria Latififar (Persian: پوریا لطیفی‌فر; born 16 August 2003) is an Iranian professional footballer who plays as a midfielder for Persepolis in the Persian Gulf Pro League.

== Club career ==
Latififar began his senior career with Gol Gohar in 2023, making 45 appearances and scoring 2 goals over three seasons. On 25 July 2026, he joined Persepolis for a reported fee of €463,000, signing a contract until 2030.

== International career ==
Latififar has represented Iran U-23 at the international level, earning seven caps.

== Career statistics ==
As of 20 November 2026

Appearances and goals by club, season and competition
Club	Season	League			Hazfi Cup		Asia		Other		Total	
Club	Season	Division	Apps	Goals	Apps	Goals	Apps	Goals	Apps	Goals	Apps	Goals
Persepolis	2026–27	Persian Gulf Pro League	7	0	0	0	–		–		7	0
Career total			7	0	0	0	0	0	0	0	7	0
