= Yasin Salmani =

Iranian footballer

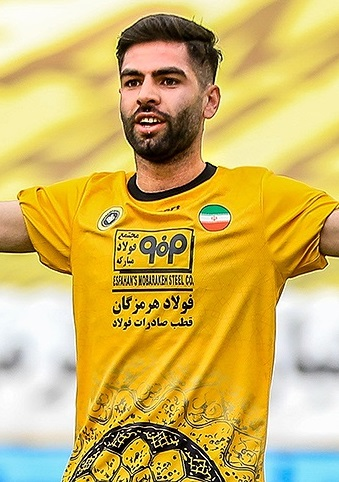
- Salmani with Sepahan in 2021

Personal information
- Full name: Yasin Salmani
- Date of birth: 27 February 2002 (age 24)
- Place of birth: Kordkuy, Iran
- Height: 1.83 m (6 ft 0 in)
- Positions: Attacking midfielder; forward

Team information
- Current team: Persepolis
- Number: 80

Youth career
- 2014–2018: Sepahan

Senior career*
Years	Team	Apps	(Gls)
2019–2023	Sepahan	50	(7)
2023–	Persepolis	21	(1)

International career
2018	Iran U17	8	(0)
2019	Iran U20	2	(1)
2021–2023	Iran U23	18	(7)
- * Club domestic league appearances and goals as of 20 November 2026

Yasin Salmani (Persian: یاسین سلمانی; born 27 February 2002) is an Iranian professional footballer who plays as an attacking midfielder for Persian Gulf Pro League club Persepolis.

== Club career ==
=== Sepahan ===
Salmani made his Persian Gulf Pro League debut on 19 December 2019 against Shahin Bushehr.

=== Persepolis ===
On 20 August 2023, Salmani signed a two-year contract with Persian Gulf Pro League champions Persepolis. Esteghlal was also interested to make a deal with him.

On 30 August 2023, Salmani scored his first goal for the team in a league match against Foolad in the dying moments of the match.

== Career statistics ==
=== Club ===
As of 20 November 2026

Club	Division	Season	League		Hazfi Cup		Asia		Other		Total	
Club	Division	Season	Apps	Goals	Apps	Goals	Apps	Goals	Apps	Goals	Apps	Goals
Sepahan	Pro League	2019–20	1	0	0	0	—		—		1	0
Sepahan	Pro League	2020–21	17	4	3	0	1	0	—		21	4
Sepahan	Pro League	2021–22	14	1	1	0	5	0	—		20	1
Sepahan	Pro League	2022–23	18	2	2	0	—		—		20	2
Sepahan	Total		50	7	6	0	6	0	—		62	7
Persepolis	Pro League	2023–24	3	1	0	0	2	0	—		5	1
Persepolis	Pro League	2024–25	10	0	1	0	3	0	0	0	14	0
Persepolis	Pro League	2025–26	3	0	0	0	—		1	0	4	0
Persepolis	Pro League	2026–27	5	0	0	0	—		—		5	0
Persepolis	Total		21	1	1	0	5	0	1	0	28	1
Career totals			71	8	7	0	11	0	1	0	90	8

== Honours ==
Iran U19

- CAFA Junior Championship 2019

Persepolis

- Persian Gulf Pro League (1): 2023–24
