= Danial Eiri =

Iranian footballer (born 2003)

Personal information
- Full name: Danial Eiri
- Date of birth: 26 October 2003 (age 23)
- Place of birth: Gonbad-e Kavus, Iran
- Height: 1.85 m (6 ft 1 in)
- Position: Centre-back

Team information
- Current team: Persepolis
- Number: 89

Youth career
- –2024: Zob Ahan

Senior career*
Years	Team	Apps	(Gls)
2024–2026	Zob Ahan	19	(0)
2025–2026	→ Malavan (loan)	36	(0)
2026	Nassaji Mazandaran	0	(0)
2026–	Persepolis	6	(0)

International career^{‡}
2022–2023	Iran U20	8	(0)
2023–	Iran U23	9	(0)
- * Club domestic league appearances and goals as of 6 November 2026 ‡ National team caps and goals as of 1 June 2026

Danial Eiri (Persian: دانیال ایری; born 26 October 2003) is an Iranian professional footballer who plays as a Centre-back for Persian Gulf Pro League side Persepolis.

== Club career ==
On 19 January 2025, Eiri joined Malavan, on loan from Zob Ahan.

== International career ==
In 2023, Eiri was part of the Iran under-20 national team squad at the 2023 AFC U-20 Asian Cup in Uzbekistan, and was later selected for the under-23 national team's squad for the 2026 AFC U-23 Asian Cup.

He was first invited to an Iran national team training camp in March 2025. In March 2026, he was supposed to travel with Iran for the 2026 Jordan International Tournament, but was unable to join them due to issues relating to his military service, he was replaced in the team by Arya Yousefi.

On 16 May, Eiri was included in Iran's 30-man preliminary squad for the 2026 FIFA World Cup, before being officially selected for the final squad on 1 June.

== Career statistics ==
=== Club ===
As of 6 November 2026

Club	Season	League			Cup		Continental		Other		Total	
Club	Season	Division	Apps	Goals	Apps	Goals	Apps	Goals	Apps	Goals	Apps	Goals
Zob Ahan	2023–24	Pro League	12	0	2	0	—		—		14	0
Zob Ahan	2024–25	Pro League	7	0	0	0	—		—		7	0
Zob Ahan	Total		19	0	2	0	—		—		21	0
Malavan (loan)	2024–25	Pro League	14	0	4	0	—		—		18	0
Malavan (loan)	2025–26	Pro League	22	0	2	0	—		—		24	0
Malavan (loan)	Total		36	0	6	0	—		—		42	0
Persepolis	2026–27	Pro League	6	0	0	0	—		—		6	0
Persepolis	Total		6	0	0	0	—		—		6	0
Career total			61	0	8	0	0	0	0	0	69	0
