= Kourosh Ezhdehakosh =

Iranian football player

Personal information
- Full name: Kourosh Ezhdehakosh
- Date of birth: 2007 (age 19)
- Place of birth: Kazerun, Fars, Iran
- Height: 1.86 m (6 ft 1 in)
- Position: Attacking midfielder

Team information
- Current team: Nassaji Mazandaran (on loan from Persepolis)
- Number: 99

Senior career*
Years	Team	Apps	(Gls)
2024–2025	Pars Jonoubi	8	(2)
2025–2026	Aluminium Arak	10	(1)
2026–	Persepolis	0	(0)
2026–	→ Nassaji Mazandaran (loan)	6	(0)
- * Club domestic league appearances and goals as of 2 September 2026

Kourosh Ezhdehakosh (Persian: کوروش اژدهاکش; born 2007 in Kazerun) is an Iranian professional footballer who plays as an attacking midfielder for Nassaji in the Persian Gulf Pro League, on loan from Persepolis. He is of Qashqai descent.

He has previously played for Pars Jonoubi and Aluminium Arak. In August 2026, he signed a four-year contract with Persepolis. Shortly after, in September 2026, he joined Nassaji on loan during the final hours of the Iranian transfer window. He made his debut for Nassaji in their starting lineup against Shams Azar.

== Club career ==
=== Pars Jonoubi Jam ===
Ezhdehakosh began his football career at Pars Jonoubi Jam and later joined the senior team. He made his debut in the Hazfi Cup during the 2024–25 season against Damash Gilan, coming on as a substitute and scoring a goal. He also scored in the penalty shootout for Pars Jonoubi.

Following Ezhdehakosh's transfer from Aluminium Arak to Persepolis, Pars Jonoubi filed a complaint against the transfer. The club claimed that according to an agreement made when Ezhdehakosh transferred from Pars Jonoubi to Aluminium Arak, they were entitled to a share of any future transfer. Pars Jonoubi issued a statement declaring the transfer to Persepolis illegal and requested that Persepolis and Nassaji refrain from using the player.

Pars Jonoubi had previously sent a letter to the league organization requesting payment of their dues from the transfer of Ezhdehakosh from Pars Jonoubi to Aluminium Arak.

=== Aluminium Arak ===
In 2025, Ezhdehakosh joined Aluminium Arak and played in the Persian Gulf Pro League for the 2025–26 season. In the second half of the season, he became a regular starter for Aluminium Arak.

He scored his first league goal for Aluminium Arak in the 15th minute of a match against Esteghlal Khuzestan in week 19 of the league, which ended in a 1–1 draw.

=== Persepolis ===
In August 2026, Persepolis reached an agreement with Aluminium Arak to sign Ezhdehakosh. Media reports indicated he signed a four-year contract. He joined Persepolis as one of Aluminium Arak's young talents.

Reports initially suggested he would be loaned to Nassaji Mazandaran to gain more playing time. However, head coach Mehdi Tartar decided to keep Ezhdehakosh at Persepolis.

=== Nassaji (loan) ===
In September 2026, after agreements between Persepolis and Nassaji, Ezhdehakosh joined Nassaji on loan for the 2026–27 season. He had already been training with Nassaji before the official announcement and made his debut in the starting lineup against Shams Azar.
