= Mehdi Tikdari =

Iranian football player (b. 1996)

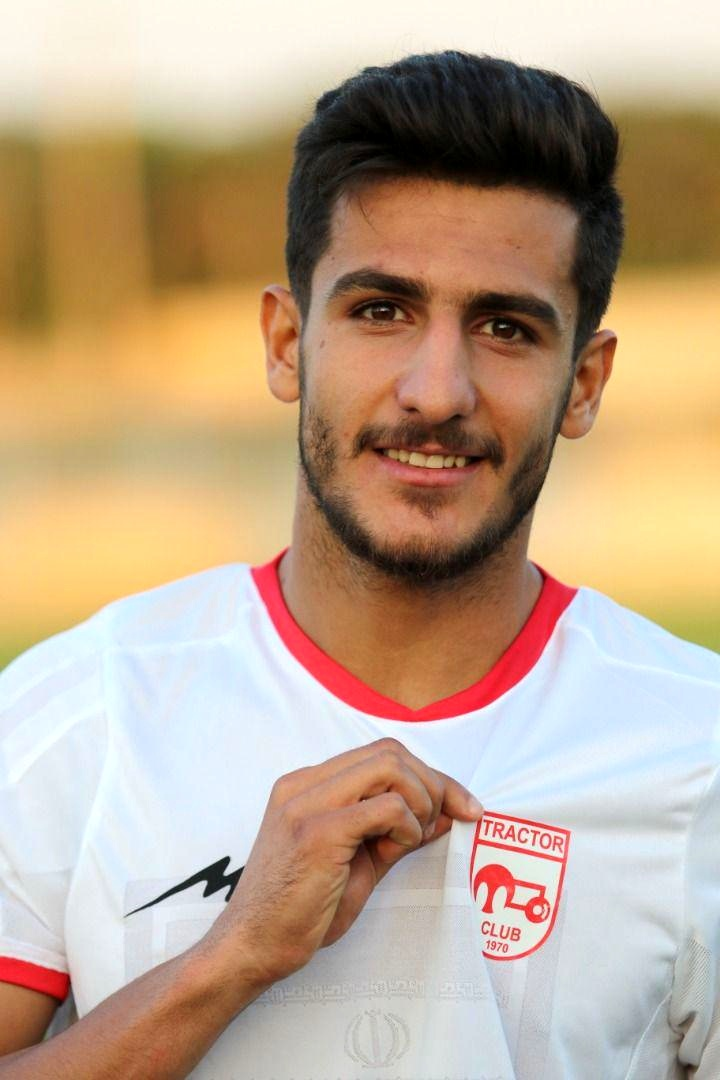
- Tikdari with Tractor in 2019

Personal information
- Full name: Mehdi Tikdarinejad
- Date of birth: June 13, 1996 (age 30)
- Place of birth: Kerman, Iran
- Height: 1.84 m (6 ft 0 in)
- Position: Winger

Team information
- Current team: Persepolis
- Number: 8

Youth career
- 2013–2016: Mes Kerman

Senior career*
Years	Team	Apps	(Gls)
2016–2019	Mes Kerman	75	(14)
2019–2021	Tractor	56	(3)
2021–2026	Gol Gohar	117	(14)
2026–	Persepolis	12	(0)

International career^{‡}
2025	Iran	1	(0)
Medal record
Representing Iran
CAFA Nations Cup
Runner-up	2025 Tajikistan–Uzbekistan	Team
- * Club domestic league appearances and goals as of 20 November 2026 ‡ National team caps and goals as of 29 August 2025

Mehdi Tikdari (Persian: مهدی تیکدری; born June 13, 1996) is an Iranian football player who plays as a right back for Persepolis in the Persian Gulf Pro League.

== Club career ==
=== Tractor ===
Mehdi Tikdari extended his contract with this team for five seasons in December 2020 under an agreement with Mohammad Alipour, CEO of Tractor.

== Personal life ==
On 24 January 2026, Tikdari was summoned by the Football Federation Islamic Republic of Iran for expressing solidarity with the 2025–2026 Iranian protests by placing his hands over his eyes, in a symbolic gesture of mourning, when he scored a goal against Fajr Sepasi Shiraz F.C..

== Career statistics ==
=== Club ===
As of 20 November 2026

Club	Season	League			Cup		Continental		Other		Total	
Club	Season	Division	Apps	Goals	Apps	Goals	Apps	Goals	Apps	Goals	Apps	Goals
Persepolis	2026–27	Pro League	12	0	0	0	—		—		12	0
Persepolis	Total		12	0	0	0	—		—		12	0

== Honours ==
Tractor

- Hazfi Cup (1): 2019–20

== International career ==
He made his debut against Afghanistan on 29 August 2025 in CAFA Championship.

=== International ===
As of match played 29 August 2025

Appearances and goals by national team and year
National team	Year	Apps	Goals
Iran
Iran	2025	1	0
Total		1	0
