= Pouria Shahrabadi =

Iranian footballer

Personal information
- Full name: Pouria Shahrabadi
- Date of birth: 15 June 2006 (age 20)
- Place of birth: Gorgan, Iran
- Height: 1.89 m (6 ft 2 in)
- Position: Striker

Team information
- Current team: Persepolis
- Number: 21

Youth career
- –2024: Esteghlal

Senior career*
Years	Team	Apps	(Gls)
2024–2026	Gol Gohar	24	(4)
2026–	Persepolis	13	(2)

International career
2025–2026	Iran U-20	3	(0)
2026–	Iran U-23	3	(1)
- * Club domestic league appearances and goals as of 20 November 2026

Pouria Shahrabadi (Persian: پوریا شهرآبادی; born 15 June 2006) is an Iranian professional footballer who plays as a striker for Persepolis in the Persian Gulf Pro League.

== Club career ==
Shahrabadi began his professional career with Gol Gohar Sirjan, joining the senior team for the 2024 season. He made his debut in the Persian Gulf Pro League and by the end of 2025, he had made 16 appearances across all competitions, scoring 1 goal. He scored his first professional goal against Esteghlal, a match which Gol Gohar won 1–0.

On 9 July 2026, Shahrabadi signed a four-year contract with Persepolis for a reported fee of €400,000.

== International career ==
Shahrabadi has represented Iran U-20 at the international level, earning 3 caps.

== Career statistics ==
As of 20 November 2026

Club	Division	Season	League		Hazfi Cup		Asia		Other		Total	
Club	Division	Season	Apps	Goals	Apps	Goals	Apps	Goals	Apps	Goals	Apps	Goals
Persepolis	Persian Gulf Pro League	2026–27	13	2	0	0	–	–	–	–	13	2
Persepolis total			13	2	0	0	–	–	–	–	13	2
