= Ali Alipour =

Iranian footballer (born 1995)

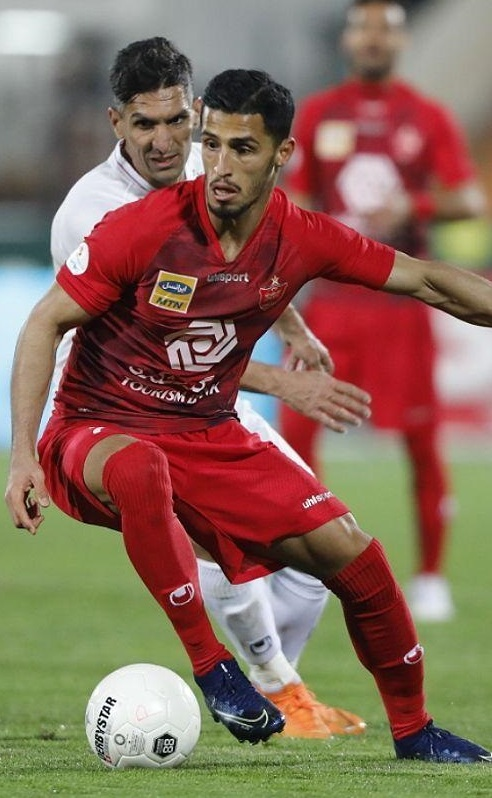
- Alipour playing for Persepolis in 2020

Personal information
- Full name: Ali Alipour Ghara
- Date of birth: 11 November 1995 (age 31)
- Place of birth: Qaem Shahr, Iran
- Height: 1.83 m (6 ft 0 in)
- Position: Forward

Team information
- Current team: Persepolis
- Number: 9

Youth career
- 2010–2011: Nassaji
- 2011–2012: Steel Azin

Senior career*
Years	Team	Apps	(Gls)
2010–2011	Nassaji	1	(0)
2012–2013	Sang Ahan Bafq	25	(3)
2013–2015	Rah Ahan	25	(4)
2015–2020	Persepolis	153	(56)
2020–2022	Marítimo	60	(10)
2022–2024	Gil Vicente	34	(4)
2024–	Persepolis	65	(23)

International career^{‡}
2010–2011	Iran U17	6	(3)
2011–2013	Iran U20	6	(8)
2018–	Iran	15	(1)
Medal record
Representing Iran
CAFA Nations Cup
Runner-up	2025 Tajikistan–Uzbekistan	Team
- * Club domestic league appearances and goals as of 6 November 2026 ‡ National team caps and goals as of 16 June 2026

Ali Alipour (Persian: علی علیپور; born 11 November 1995) is an Iranian professional footballer who plays as a Striker for Persian Gulf Pro League club Persepolis and the Iran national team.

At the age of 19 years and 185 days, Alipour was the youngest-ever player to score in the Tehran derby after scoring in Persepolis 1–0 victory on 15 May 2015. He is the only player in Tehran derby history who has scored the winning goal in two derby matches.

== Club career ==
Alipour started his career with Nassaji Mazandaran. He made his professional debut in 2010 at the age of 14 with Azadegan League club Nassaji Mazandaran.

=== Persepolis ===
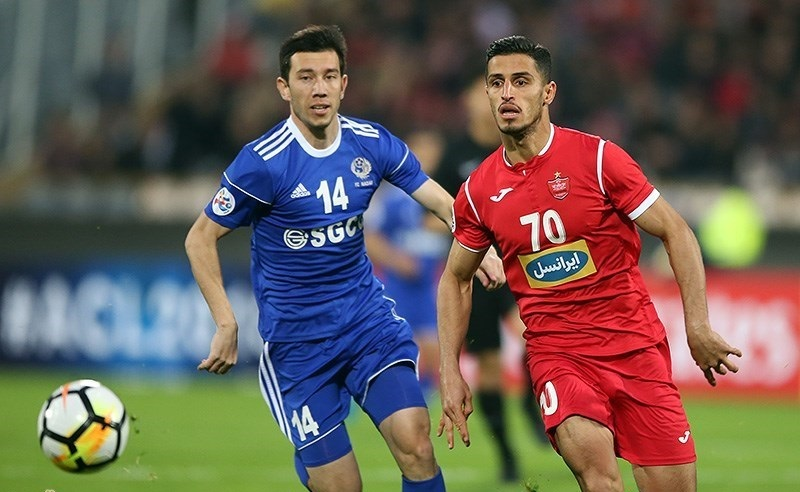
Alipour, pictured playing against Nasaf in the 2018 AFC Champions League

Alipour signed with Persepolis in January 2015. He scored his first goal for the club on 11 March 2015 in a 2–2 draw against Naft Masjed Soleyman. On 15 May, Alipour scored in the Tehran derby against Esteghlal, making him the youngest player to score in the Tehran derby at 19 years old. On 26 March 2016, Alipour scored his first hat-trick for the club in a 6–4 friendly win against Omani champions Al-Oruba.

He was the Persian Gulf Pro League top goalscorer in 2017–18, tallying 19 goals.

=== C.S. Marítimo ===
On 28 September 2020, Alipour joined Portuguese Primeira Liga club Marítimo on a two-year deal.

He helped the team in many important matches and was one of the key players of the team in the front line.

=== Gil Vicente ===
On 18 May 2022, Alipour joined Portuguese club Gil Vicente. At this time, he was also linked to his previous club, Persepolis.

=== Return to Persepolis ===
On 19 July 2024, Alipour joined Persian Gulf Pro League side Persepolis with another contract. He was also linked to Esteghlal Tehran. After signing the contract with Persepolis he said: "I came back with full concentration and calm thinking, and I'm very happy that it happened".

== International career ==
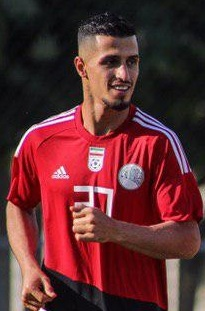
Alipour in Iran training in 2019.

Alipour was called up to the Iran national football team in March 2017. He made his debut against Sierra Leone on 17 March 2018 in a friendly match.

On 1 June 2026, he was named in the 26-man squad for the 2026 FIFA World Cup.

== Career statistics ==
=== Club ===
As of match played 21 November 2026

Club	Season	League			National cup (Note: Includes Iranian Hazfi Cup, Taça de Portugal)		League cup (Note: Includes Taça da Liga)		Continental		Other		Total	
Club	Season	Division	Apps	Goals	Apps	Goals	Apps	Goals	Apps	Goals	Apps	Goals	Apps	Goals
Nassaji	2010–2011	Azadegan League	1	0	0	0	—		—		—		1	0
Sang Ahan Bafq	2012–13	Azadegan League	25	3	0	0	—		—		—		25	3
Rah Ahan	2013–14	Persian Gulf Pro League	17	2	3	1	—		—		—		20	3
Rah Ahan	2014–15	Persian Gulf Pro League	8	1	2	0	—		—		—		10	1
Rah Ahan	Total		25	3	5	1	—		—		—		30	4
Persepolis	2014–15	Persian Gulf Pro League	11	2	0	0	—		8 (Note: Appearances in AFC Champions League)	0	—		19	2
Persepolis	2015–16	Persian Gulf Pro League	26	5	3	0	—		—		—		29	5
Persepolis	2016–17	Persian Gulf Pro League	29	4	1	0	—		7	0	—		37	4
Persepolis	2017–18	Persian Gulf Pro League	28	19	3	1	—		12	5	1 (Note: Appearance in Iranian Super Cup)	1	44	26
Persepolis	2018–19	Persian Gulf Pro League	30	14	5	1	—		12	3	0	0	47	18
Persepolis	2019–20	Persian Gulf Pro League	29	12	4	3	—		2	2	0	0	35	17
Persepolis	2024–25	Persian Gulf Pro League	30	12	2	2	—		8 (Note: Appearances in AFC Champions League Elite)	1	1	0	41	15
Persepolis	2025–26	Persian Gulf Pro League	22	6	1	0	—		—		—		23	6
Persepolis	2026–27	Persian Gulf Pro League	13	5	0	0	—		—		—		13	5
Persepolis	Total		218	79	19	7	—		49	11	2	1	288	98
Marítimo	2020–21	Primeira Liga	26	2	3	0	0	0	—		—		29	2
Marítimo	2021–22	Primeira Liga	34	8	1	1	0	0	—		1	0	36	9
Marítimo	Total		60	10	4	1	0	0	—		1	0	65	11
Gil Vicente	2022–23	Primeira Liga	15	2	2	1	4	1	3 (Note: Appearances in UEFA Europa Conference League)	0	—		24	4
Gil Vicente	2023–24	Primeira Liga	19	2	1	0	–		–		–		20	2
Gil Vicente	Total		34	4	3	1	4	1	3	0	–		44	6
Career total			363	99	31	10	4	1	52	11	3	1	453	122

=== International ===
As of 16 June 2026

Appearances and goals by national team and year
National team	Year	Apps	Goals
Iran	2018	2	0
Iran	2019	1	0
Iran	2025	8	1
Iran	2026	4	0
Total		15	1

Scores and results list Iran's goal tally first, score column indicates score after each Alipour goal.

List of international goals scored by Ali Alipour
No.	Date	Venue	Cap	Opponent	Score	Result	Competition
1	1 September 2025	Hisor Central Stadium, Hisor, Tajikistan	7	India	2–0	3–0	2025 CAFA Nations Cup

== Honours ==
Persepolis

- Persian Gulf Pro League: 2016–17, 2017–18, 2018–19, 2019–20
- Hazfi Cup: 2018–19
- Iranian Super Cup: 2017, 2018, 2019
- AFC Champions League runner-up: 2018

Individual

- Persian Gulf Pro League Top Goalscorer: 2017–18
- Persian Gulf Pro League Team of the Year: 2017–18
- Persian Gulf Pro League Best Striker of the Year: 2017–18
- Navad Player of the Month: September 2017, October 2017
