= Marko Bakić =

Montenegrin footballer

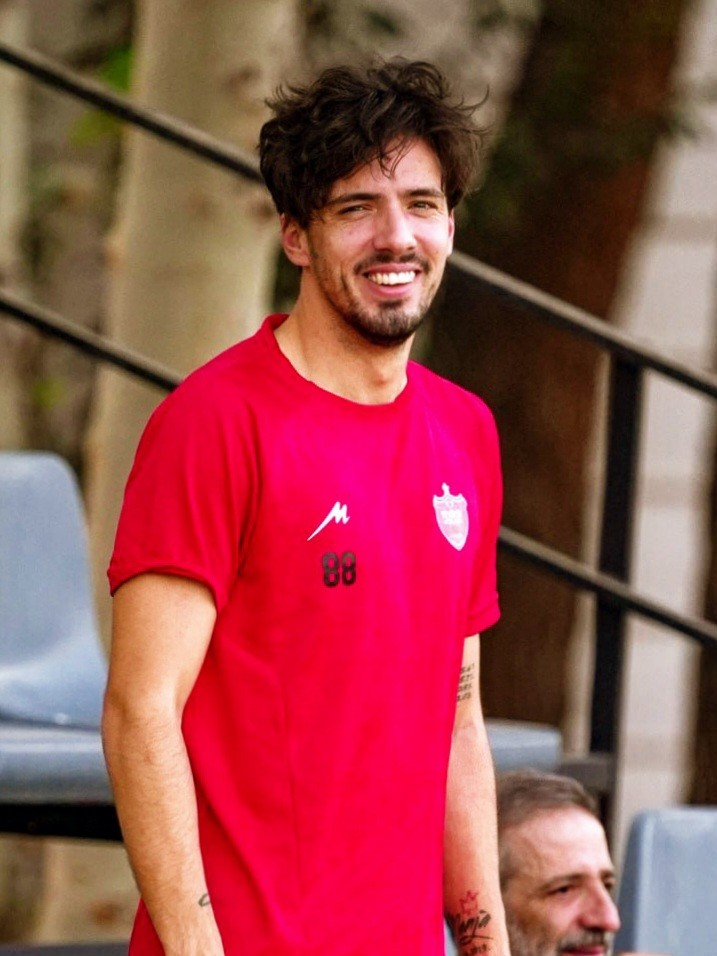
- Bakić in Persepolis training in 2025

Personal information
- Full name: Marko Bakić
- Date of birth: 1 November 1993 (age 33)
- Place of birth: Budva, FR Yugoslavia
- Height: 1.86 m (6 ft 1 in)
- Position: Midfielder

Team information
- Current team: Persepolis
- Number: 88

Youth career
- 2008–2010: Mogren

Senior career*
Years	Team	Apps	(Gls)
2010–2012	Mogren	33	(5)
2012–2013	Torino	1	(0)
2013–2016	Fiorentina	3	(0)
2014–2015	→ Spezia (loan)	21	(1)
2016	→ Belenenses (loan)	12	(4)
2016–2019	Braga	6	(0)
2017	→ Alcorcón (loan)	15	(1)
2018	→ Belenenses (loan)	13	(1)
2018–2019	→ Mouscron (loan)	18	(2)
2019–2022	Mouscron	55	(3)
2022–2023	Budućnost Podgorica	13	(5)
2023–2025	OFI	71	(8)
2025–	Persepolis	19	(1)

International career^{‡}
2011–2012	Montenegro U19	15	(0)
2011–2014	Montenegro U21	8	(0)
2012–	Montenegro	37	(0)
- * Club domestic league appearances and goals as of 7 September 2026 ‡ National team caps and goals as of 22:40, 9 October 2025 (UTC)

Marko Bakić (Montenegrin: Марко Бакић, pronounced [mâːrko bǎːkitɕ, bâ-, bǎ-]; born 1 November 1993) is a Montenegrin professional footballer who plays as a midfielder for Persian Gulf Pro League club Persepolis.

== Club career ==
=== Torino ===
On 30 August 2012, it was announced that Bakić signed a two-year contract with Torino F.C., with a clause that states that Fiorentina possesses 50% of the player's contract and is eligible to have the player introduced to their squad after a season spent with Torino. Bakić made his Serie A debut at the age of 19 for Torino on 19 May 2013, in a 2–2 draw with Calcio Catania.

=== Fiorentina ===
On 21 June 2013, Bakić was transferred from Torino to Fiorentina.

=== Braga ===
On 27 July 2016, Bakić signed a five-year contract for Portuguese club Braga. After being sparingly used, he was loaned to Spanish Segunda División club AD Alcorcón on 31 January 2017.

=== Mouscron ===
After having spent the 2018-19 season at Mouscron on loan from Braga with an option to buy, Mouscron decided to activate the option in June 2019. Bakić penned a 4-year contract.

=== OFI ===
On 18 January 2023, Bakić joined OFI of the Greek Super League on a free transfer until the summer of 2024.

=== Persepolis ===
Marko Bakic joined Persepolis Tehran on July 16, 2025, on a 2-year contract. In his ninth game with Persepolis, Bakic managed to score his first goal of the season in a spectacular manner by scoring a goal against Tractor from a planted shot and preventing his team from losing.

== International career ==
Bakić made his debut for Montenegro at the age of 18 against Latvia on 15 August 2012 to 20 June 2024 and has, as of July 2020, earned a total of 15 caps, scoring no goals.

== Career statistics ==
=== Club ===
As of 7 September 2026

Club	Season	League			Cup		Continental		Other		Total	
Club	Season	Division	Apps	Goals	Apps	Goals	Apps	Goals	Apps	Goals	Apps	Goals
Persepolis	2025–26	Pro League	16	1	1	0	—		1	0	18	1
Persepolis	2026–27	Pro League	3	0	0	0	—		—		3	0
Persepolis	Total		19	1	1	0	—		1	0	21	1

=== International ===
As of 9 October 2025

Appearances and goals by national team and year
National team	Year	Apps	Goals
Montenegro
Montenegro	2012	1	0
Montenegro	2013	1	0
Montenegro	2014	3	0
Montenegro	2015	2	0
Montenegro	2016	4	0
Montenegro	2018	1	0
Montenegro	2019	3	0
Montenegro	2020	5	0
Montenegro	2021	1	0
Montenegro	2023	3	0
Montenegro	2024	8	0
Montenegro	2025	5	0
Total		37	0

== Honours ==
Mogren

- Montenegrin First League: 2010–11

Budućnost Podgorica

- Montenegrin First League: 2022–23
