= Abolfazl Babaei =

Iranian footballer (born 2003)

Personal information
- Full name: Abolfazl Babaei Yekta
- Date of birth: 22 October 2003 (age 23)
- Place of birth: Dialabad, Qazvin, Iran
- Position: Forward

Youth career
- Saipa
- 2018–2020: Moghavemat Tehran
- 2020–2021: Baderan

Senior career*
Years	Team	Apps	(Gls)
2021	Baderan	1	(1)
2021–2024	Fajr Sepasi	43	(6)
2024–2026	Persepolis	12	(0)
- * Club domestic league appearances and goals as of 16 July 2026

Abolfazl Babaei (Persian: ابوالفضل بابایی; born 22 October 2003 in Qazvin) is an Iranian professional footballer who plays as a forward.

He has previously played for Baderan, Fajr Sepasi, and Persepolis.

== Club career ==
Babaei began his senior career with Baderan in 2021, making one appearance and scoring one goal. He then joined Fajr Sepasi, where he made 43 appearances and scored 6 goals over three seasons.

In 2024, Babaei signed with Persepolis. He made 12 appearances for the club across two seasons before leaving in July 2026.

== Career statistics ==
As of 18 April 2025

Club	Division	Season	League		Hazfi Cup		Asia		Super Cup		Total	
Club	Division	Season	Apps	Goals	Apps	Goals	Apps	Goals	Apps	Goals	Apps	Goals
Baderan	Azadegan League	2020–21	1	1	0	0	–	–	–	–	1	1
Baderan total			1	1	0	0	–	–	–	–	1	1
Fajr Sepasi	Persian Gulf Pro League	2021–22	7	0	2	0	–	–	–	–	9	0
Fajr Sepasi	Azadegan League	2022–23	24	4	0	0	–	–	–	–	24	4
Fajr Sepasi	Azadegan League	2023–24	12	2	0	0	–	–	–	–	12	2
Fajr Sepasi total			43	6	2	0	–	–	–	–	45	6
Persepolis	Persian Gulf Pro League	2023–24	5	0	1	0	–	–	–	–	6	0
Persepolis	Persian Gulf Pro League	2024–25	7	0	0	0	0	0	0	0	7	0
Persepolis total			12	0	1	0	–	–	–	–	13	0
Career total			56	7	3	0	–	–	–	–	59	7

== Honours ==
Persepolis

- Persian Gulf Pro League: 2023–24
