= Mohammadmehdi Mohebi =

Iranian footballer

Mohammad Mehdi Mohebi
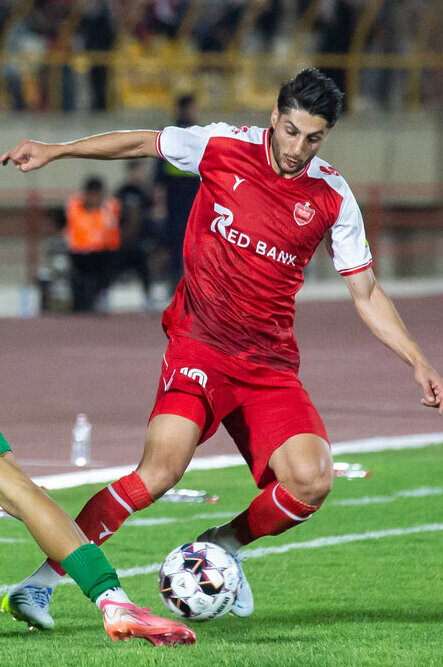
- Mohebi with Persepolis in 2026

Personal information
- Full name: Mohammad Mehdi Mohebi
- Date of birth: 10 February 2000 (age 26)
- Place of birth: Tehran, Iran
- Height: 1.86 m (6 ft 1 in)
- Position: Winger

Team information
- Current team: Persepolis
- Number: 10

Youth career
- 2015–2018: Esteghlal
- 2016–2017: → Naft Novin (loan)
- 2017: → Saipa (loan)
- 2018–2020: Moghavemat Tehran

Senior career*
Years	Team	Apps	(Gls)
2020–2021	Naft Masjed Soleyman	30	(2)
2021–2022	Paykan	19	(1)
2022–2024	Mes Rafsanjan	50	(4)
2024–2025	Sepahan	26	(7)
2025–2026	Kalba	8	(0)
2025–2026	Kalba II	2	(0)
2026	→ Sepahan (loan)	5	(1)
2026–	Persepolis	13	(4)

International career^{‡}
2021	Iran U23	2	(0)
2025–	Iran	8	(2)
Medal record
Representing Iran
CAFA Nations Cup
Runner-up	2025 Tajikistan–Uzbekistan	Team
- * Club domestic league appearances and goals as of 20 November 2026 ‡ National team caps and goals as of 17 November 2026

Mohammad Mehdi Mohebi (Persian: محمدمهدی محبی; born 10 February 2000), known as Mehdi Mohebi, is an Iranian footballer who plays as a winger for Iranian club Persepolis in the Persian Gulf Pro League and the Iran national team.

== Club career ==
=== Naft Masjed Soleyman ===
He made his debut for Naft Masjed Soleyman in first fixtures of 2020–21 Persian Gulf Pro League against Tractor.

=== Paykan ===
On 28 August 2021, Mohebi moved to Paykan. He made his debut for Paykan in first fixtures of 2021–22 Persian Gulf Pro League against Naft Masjed Soleyman.

=== Persepolis ===
On 28 July 2026, Mohebi joined Persian Gulf Pro League side Persepolis on a three-year deal.

== National Team career ==
He made his debut against Qatar on 5 June 2025 in a 2026 World Cup qualification Match.

== Career statistics ==
=== Club ===
As of 20 November 2026

Club	Season	League			National Cup		Continental & other		Total	
Club	Season	League	Apps	Goals	Apps	Goals	Apps	Goals	Apps	Goals
Naft MIS	2020–21	Persian Gulf Pro League	30	2	0	0	—		30	2
Paykan	2021–22	Persian Gulf Pro League	19	1	2	0	—		21	1
Mes Rafsanjan	2022–23	Persian Gulf Pro League	20	1	1	0	—		21	1
Mes Rafsanjan	2023–24	Persian Gulf Pro League	30	3	5	2	—		35	5
Mes Rafsanjan	Total		50	4	6	2	0	0	56	6
Sepahan	2024–25	Persian Gulf Pro League	26	7	3	1	8	1	37	9
Sepahan	2025–26	Persian Gulf Pro League	5	1	0	0	2	0	7	1
Sepahan	Total		31	8	3	1	10	1	44	10
Ittihad Kalba	2025–26	UAE Pro League	8	0	0	0	1	0	9	0
Persepolis	2026–27	Persian Gulf Pro League	13	4	0	0	—		13	4
Total			151	19	11	3	11	1	173	23

=== International ===
As of match played 17 November 2026

Appearances and goals by national team and year
National team	Year	Apps	Goals
Iran
Iran	2025	4	2
Iran	2026	4	0
Total		8	2

Scores and results list Iran's goal tally first, score column indicates score after each Mohebi goal.

List of international goals scored by Mohammad Mehdi Mohebi
No.	Date	Venue	Cap	Opponent	Score	Result	Competition
1	10 June 2025	Azadi Stadium, Tehran, Iran	2	North Korea	1–0	3–0	2026 FIFA World Cup qualification
2	4 September 2025	Hisor Central Stadium, Hisar, Tajikistan	3	Tajikistan	1–0	2–2	2025 CAFA Nations Cup
