= Majid Eidi =

Iranian footballer

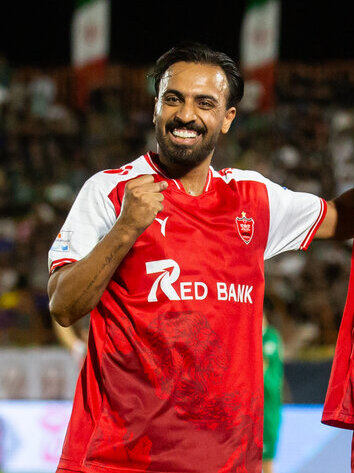
- Eidi with Persepolis in 2026

Personal information
- Date of birth: 19 September 1996 (age 30)
- Place of birth: Arak, Iran
- Height: 1.77 m (5 ft 10 in)
- Position: Right back

Team information
- Current team: Persepolis
- Number: 20

Youth career
- Naft Masjed Soleyman

Senior career*
Years	Team	Apps	(Gls)
2015–2017	Aluminium Arak	27	(1)
2017–2020	Naft Masjed Soleyman	29	(0)
2020–2021	Paykan	23	(0)
2021–2022	Naft Masjed Soleyman	30	(0)
2022–2024	Malavan	59	(2)
2024–2026	Gol Gohar	50	(1)
2026–	Persepolis	13	(1)
- * Club domestic league appearances and goals as of 20 November 2026

Majid Eidi (Persian: مجید عیدی; born 19 September 1996) is an Iranian footballer who plays for Persepolis of the Persian Gulf Pro League as a right-back.

== Club career ==
=== Persepolis ===
On 7 July 2026, Eidi joined Persian Gulf Pro League side Persepolis on a two-year deal.

== Career statistics ==
=== Club ===
As of 20 November 2026

Club	Season	League			Cup		Continental		Other		Total	
Club	Season	Division	Apps	Goals	Apps	Goals	Apps	Goals	Apps	Goals	Apps	Goals
Persepolis	2026–27	Pro League	13	1	0	0	—		—		13	1
Persepolis	Total		13	1	0	0	—		—		13	1
