= Sardar-e Azadegan Stadium =

Coordinates: 6.3259°N 50.0201°E

- Interactive map of Sardar-e Azadegan Stadium
- Full name: Sardar-e Azadegan Stadium
- Former names: Shahid Emami Stadium
- Location: Qazvin, Iran
- Owner: General Department of Sports and Youth of Qazvin Province
- Operator: Shams Azar
- Capacity: 15,000
- Surface: Grass
- Field size: 105 × 108 m

Construction
- Groundbreaking: 2003
- Opened: 19 July 2012 (14 years ago)
- Cost: 190 billion R (19 billion tomans)

Tenant
- Shams Azar

Sardar-e Azadegan Stadium (Persian: ورزشگاه سردار آزادگان), also known as Seyed Aliakbar Aboutorabi Stadium, is a stadium in Qazvin, Iran, with a seating capacity of 15,000 spectators. The stadium covers an area of 70,000 square meters and is part of the Azadegan Sports Complex.

== History ==
Construction of the 15,000-seat Sardar-e Azadegan Stadium began in 2003 with a budget of 100 billion rials. The stadium was officially opened on 19 July 2012, with a final construction cost of 190 billion rials.

== League matches hosting ==
Shams Azar has hosted its opponents at this stadium during its time in the Azadegan League. Following the club's promotion to the Persian Gulf Pro League in the 2023–24 season, the stadium has been used as Shams Azar's home ground.

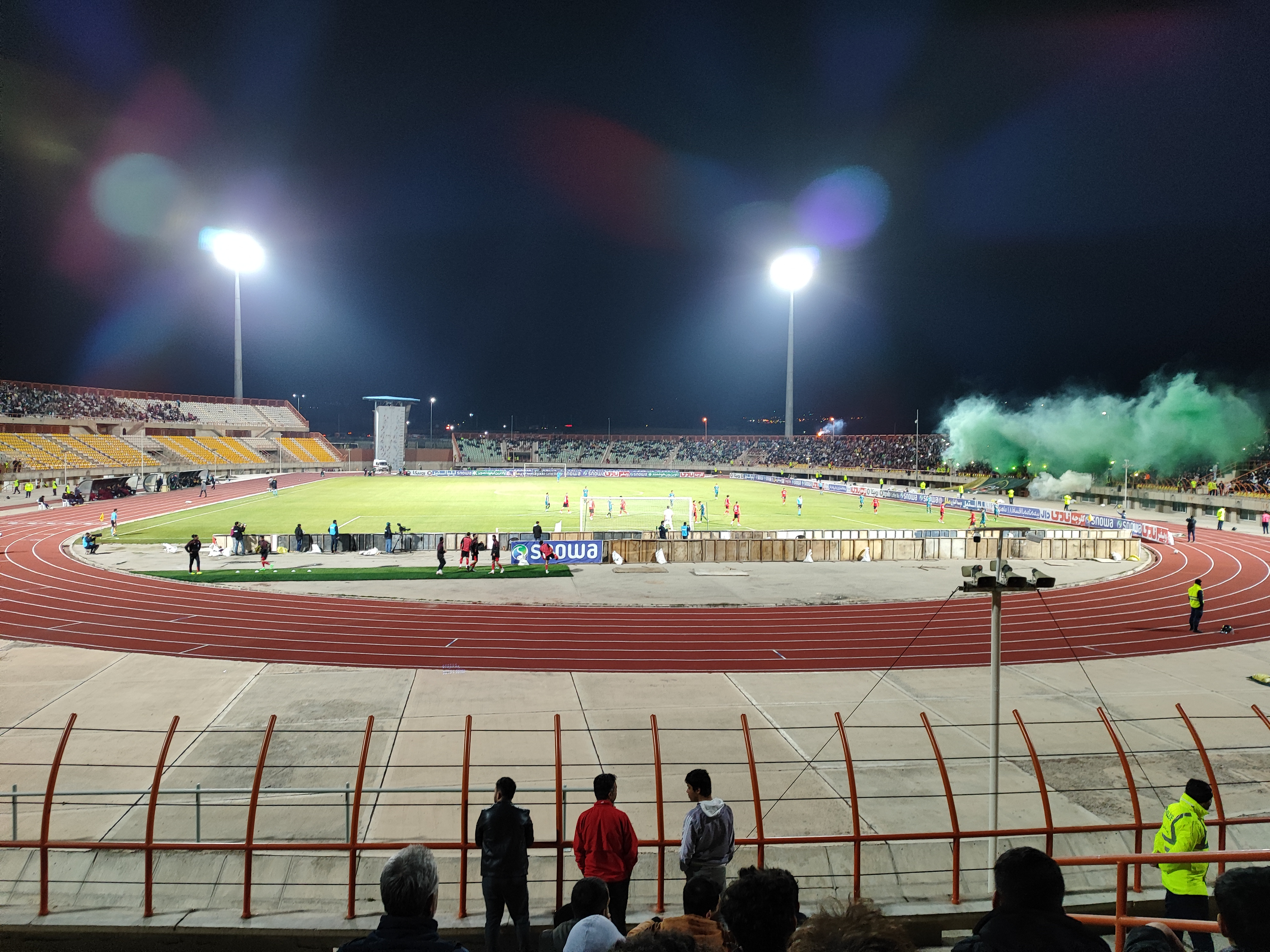
View of a match between Shams Azar and Tractor

== Facilities ==
=== Capacity ===
The stadium has a seating capacity of 15,000 spectators.

=== Lighting ===
The stadium features the largest and most standard lighting masts in the country, standing at a height of 50 meters with a capacity of 1,500 lux, installed and operational for the first time in Iran.

=== Athletics track ===
The stadium includes a tartan track (athletics) measuring 4,000 square meters.

=== Scoreboard ===
The stadium has a full-color LED scoreboard capable of displaying match time and clock.

Panoramic view of Sardar Azadegan Stadium

== Gallery ==

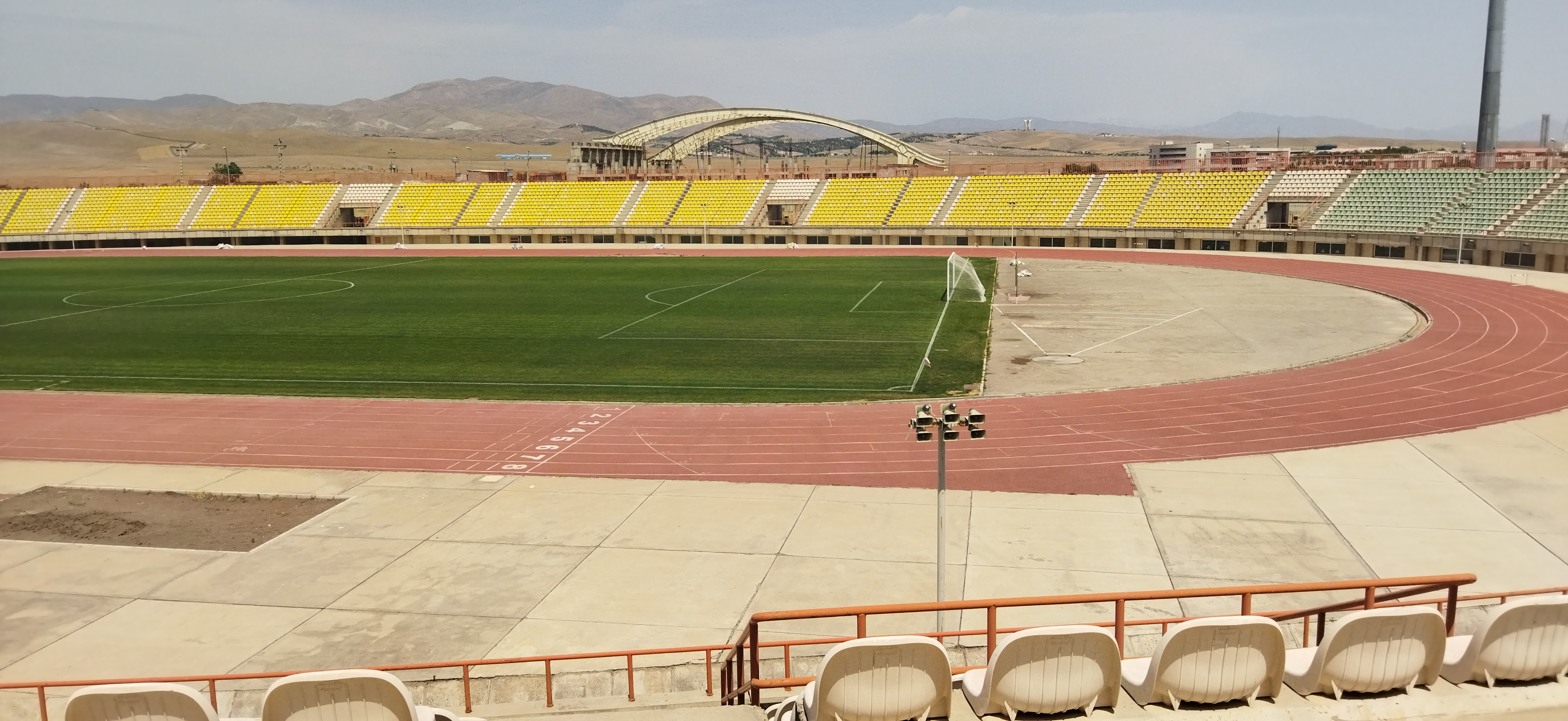

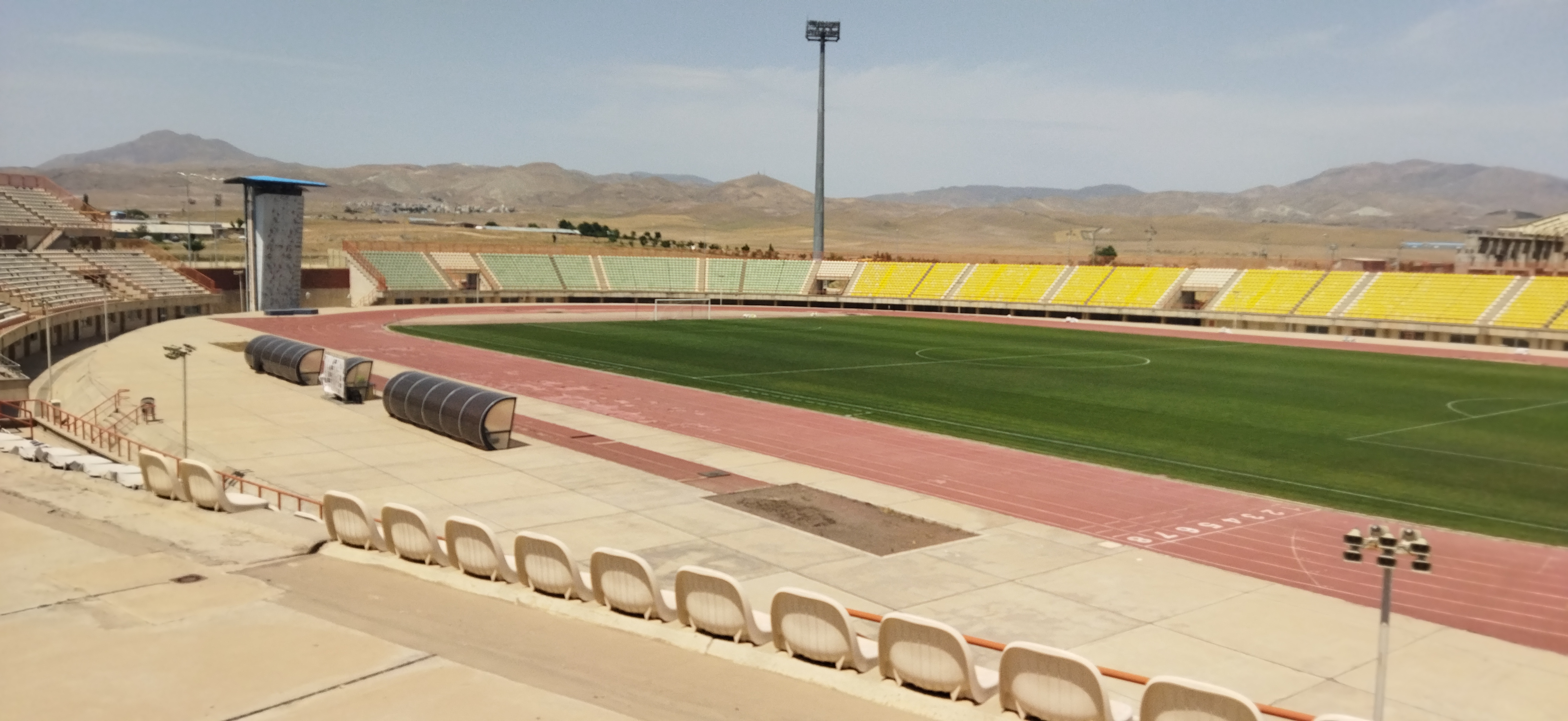

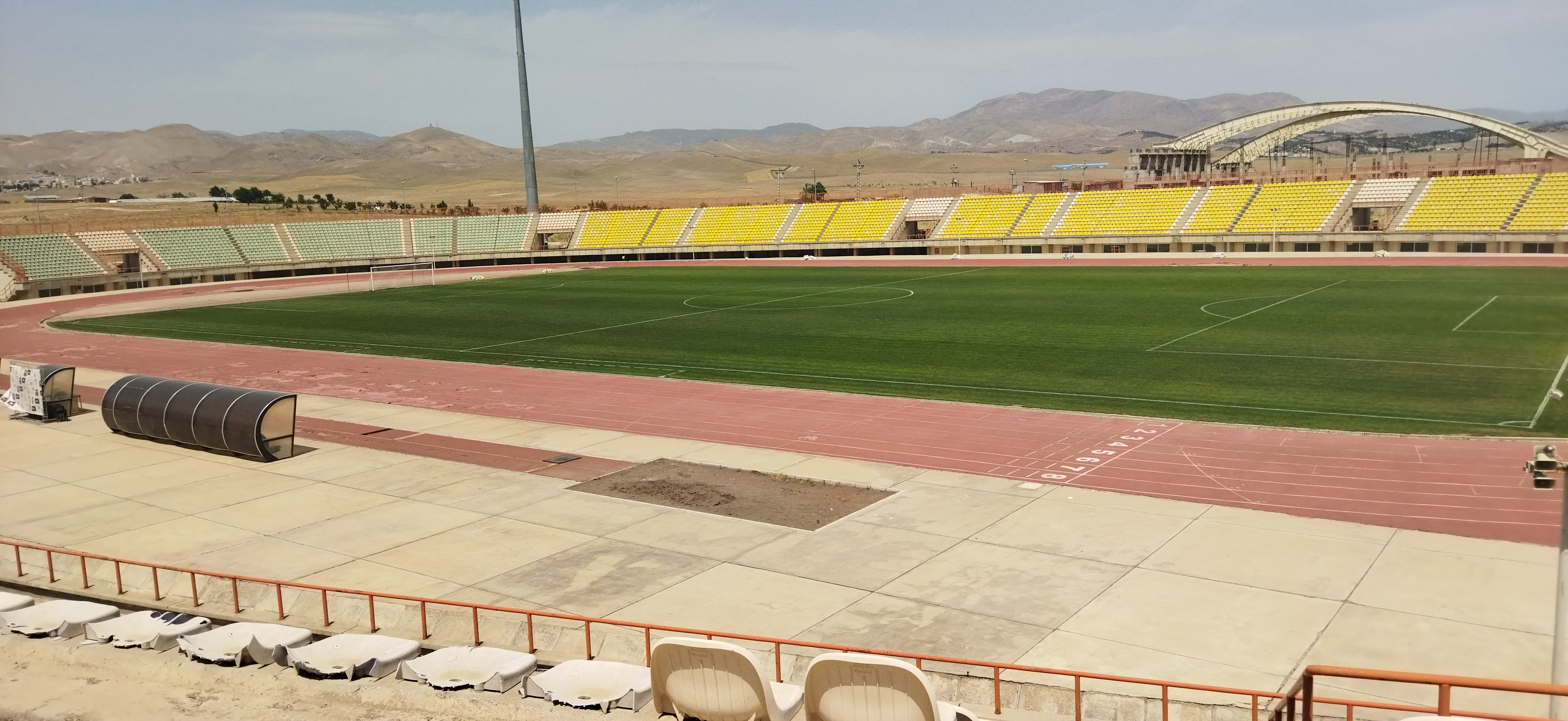

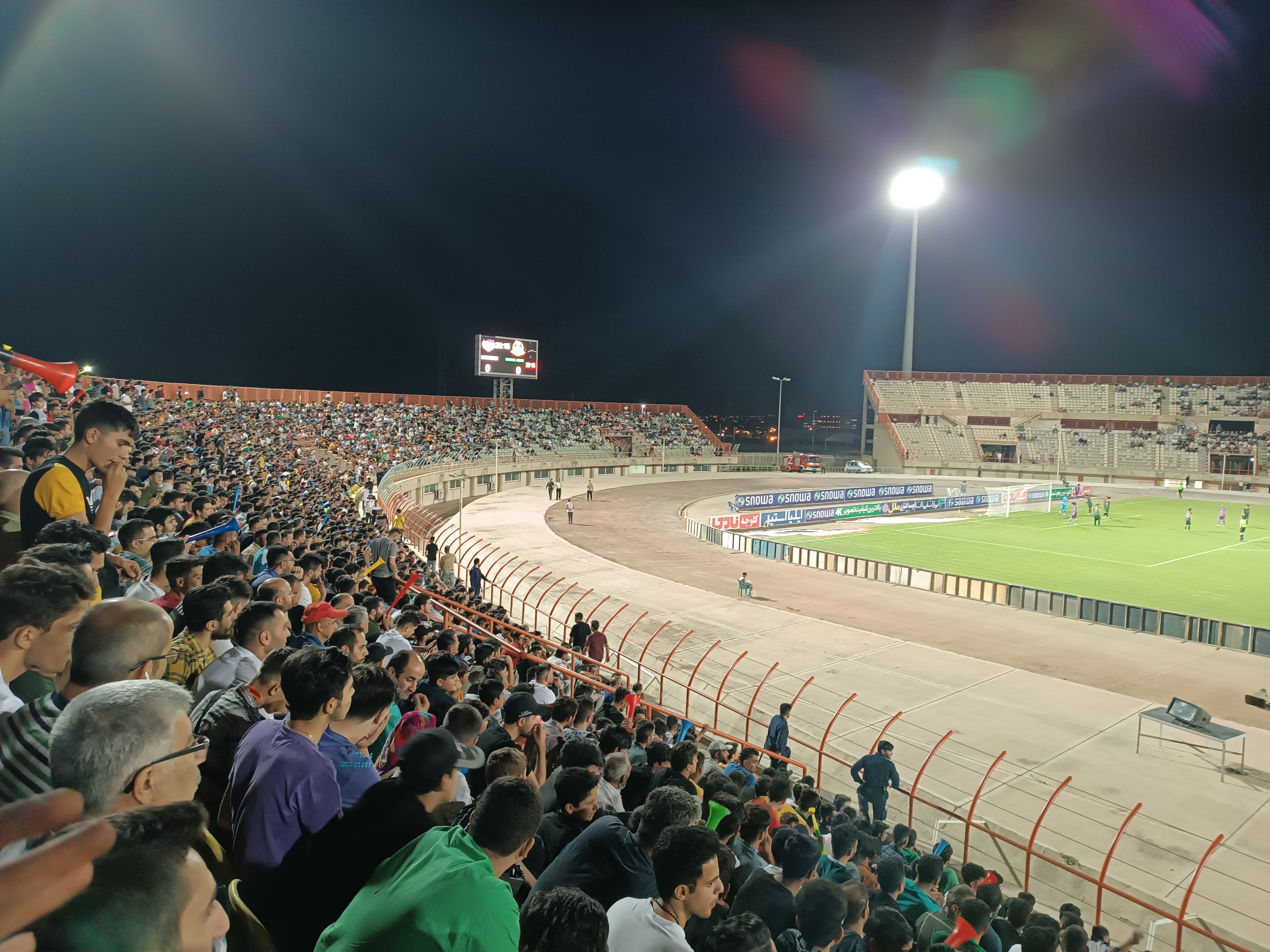
