= Amirhossein Taheri (footballer, born 2004) =

Iranian professional footballer

Personal information
- Full name: Amirhossein Taheri Tanha
- Date of birth: 21 May 2004 (age 22)
- Place of birth: Jam, Bushehr, Iran
- Height: 1.84 m (6 ft 0 in)
- Position: Centre-back

Team information
- Current team: Persepolis
- Number: 58

Youth career
- 2020–2021: Saipa
- 2021–2022: Ehsan Rey
- 2022–2024: Moghavemat Tehran

Senior career*
Years	Team	Apps	(Gls)
2024–2026	Nirooye Zamini	39	(1)
2026–	Persepolis	0	(0)
- * Club domestic league appearances and goals as of 7 September 2026

Amirhossein Taheri Tanha (Persian: امیرحسین طاهری تنها; born 21 May 2004 in Bushehr) is an Iranian professional footballer who plays as a centre-back for Persepolis. He has previously played for Mes Kerman and Nirooye Zamini in the Azadegan League, and joined Persepolis on a five-year contract in August 2026.

== Club career ==
=== Nirooye Zamini ===
Taheri began his professional career at Nirooye Zamini. He came through the club's youth ranks before progressing to the senior team.

In the 2024–25 season, Taheri played in the Azadegan League for Nirooye Zamini, making 14 appearances.

In the 2025–26 season, Taheri's role in the Nirooye Zamini squad became more prominent, as he made 25 appearances in the Azadegan League and started every match.

In addition to the Azadegan League, Taheri also played for Nirooye Zamini in the Hazfi Cup. In the round of 32 of the 2025–26 season against Shams Azar Qazvin, which ended in a 3–2 defeat for Nirooye Zamini, he played the full 90 minutes.

=== Persepolis ===
Taheri's performances at Nirooye Zamini drew interest from other clubs, and in August 2026, Persepolis announced that they had signed the young defender on a five-year contract.

== Career statistics ==
As of 7 September 2026

Club	Season	Division	Apps	Goals	Minutes
Nirooye Zamini	2024–25	Azadegan League	14	0	61
Nirooye Zamini	2025–26	Azadegan League	25	1	2,156
Nirooye Zamini	2025–26	Hazfi Cup	1	0	90
Persepolis	2026–27	Persian Gulf Pro League	1	0	10
