= Yaghoub Barajeh =

Iranian footballer

Personal information
- Full name: Yaghoub Barajeh
- Date of birth: 26 January 2006 (age 20)
- Place of birth: Abadan, Iran
- Height: 1.83 m (6 ft 0 in)
- Positions: Right back; right winger

Team information
- Current team: Nassaji Mazandaran (on loan from Persepolis)
- Number: 37

Youth career
- –2022: Kia Academy
- 2022–2024: Mes Kerman U-19

Senior career*
Years	Team	Apps	(Gls)
2024–	Persepolis	23	(1)
2026–	→ Nassaji Mazandaran (loan)	5	(0)

International career
2022–2023	Iran U-17	14	(1)
2024–	Iran U-20	11	(2)
- * Club domestic league appearances and goals as of 13 February 2026

Yaghoub Barajeh (Persian: یعقوب براجعه; born 26 January 2006) is an Iranian professional footballer who plays as a right back or right winger for Nassaji in the Persian Gulf Pro League, on loan from Persepolis. He also represents the Iran U-20 national team.

Barajeh gained recognition for scoring against Brazil U-17 at the 2023 FIFA U-17 World Cup.

He was discovered by scouts from Mehdi Mahdavikia's football academy during local tournaments in Kashan, where he began his professional football journey.

== Club career ==
=== Persepolis ===
On 25 July 2024, Barajeh signed a four-year contract with Persepolis.

On 26 August 2026, Barajeh joined Nassaji on a season-long loan.

== Career statistics ==
As of 13 February 2026

Club	Division	Season	League		Hazfi Cup		Asia		Super Cup		Total	
Club	Division	Season	Apps	Goals	Apps	Goals	Apps	Goals	Apps	Goals	Apps	Goals
Persepolis	Persian Gulf Pro League	2024–25	11	1	1	0	1	0	0	0	13	1
Persepolis	Persian Gulf Pro League	2025–26	12	0	1	0	–	–	–	–	13	0
Persepolis total			23	1	2	0	1	0	0	0	26	1

== International career ==
=== Iran U-17 ===
Barajeh was called up to the Iran U-17 national team by head coach Hossein Abdi for the 2023 AFC U-17 Asian Cup and the 2023 FIFA U-17 World Cup.

He scored Iran's first goal against Brazil U-17 during the group stage of the 2023 FIFA U-17 World Cup.
