= Shohada-ye Shahr-e Qods Stadium =

Football stadium in Shahr-e Qods, Tehran, Iran

Coordinates: 35.7018°N 51.1096°E

Shahr-e Qods Stadium
- Shohada-ye Shahr-e Qods
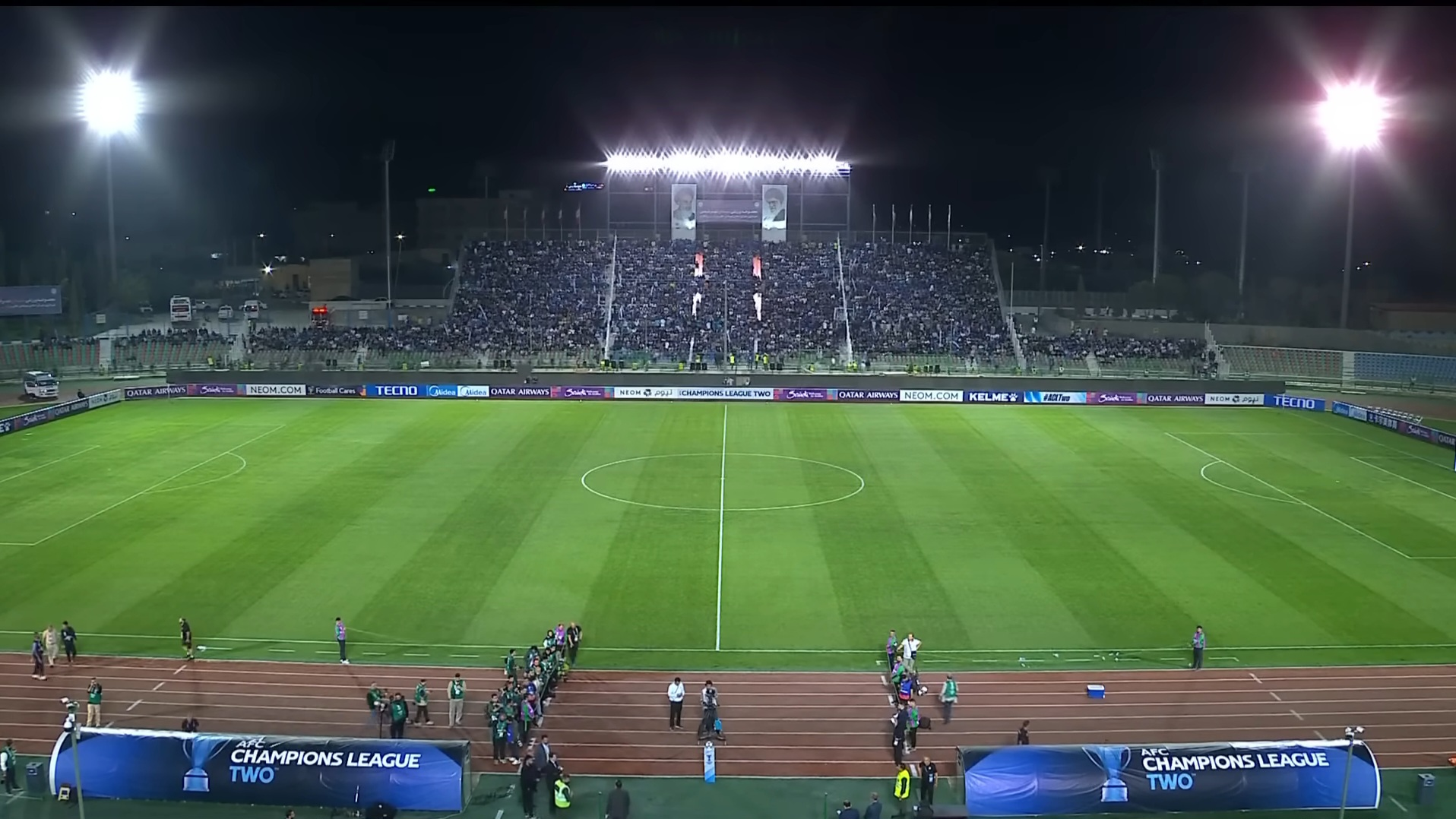
- Shohada-ye Shahr-e Qods Stadium in 2025
- Interactive map of Shahr-e Qods Stadium
- Full name: Shohada-ye Shahr-e Qods Stadium
- Location: Shahr-e Qods, Iran
- Owner: Municipality of Tehran
- Operator: Municipality of Tehran
- Capacity: 8,000
- Record attendance: 11,800; Rah Ahan vs. Persepolis (2015–16 Persian Gulf Pro League, 18 December 2015)
- Field size: 105 m × 68 m (344 ft × 223 ft)

Construction
- Built: 2005
- Opened: 2005
- Renovated: 2014 and 2024

Tenants
- Paykan (2013–2021); Rah Ahan (2015–2016); Esteghlal (2024–2026); Persepolis (2024–2026)

Shohada-ye Shahr-e Qods Stadium (Persian: ورزشگاه شهدای شهر قدس, Vârzeshgah-e Shohada-ye Shahr-e Qods) is a football stadium in Shahr-e Qods, Tehran province, Iran with a 8,000 seating capacity. The stadium is named for supporters of Palestine in Iran.

== History ==
Shohada-ye Shahr-e Qods Stadium was constructed by Municipality of Tehran in 2005. In mid-2006 Persepolis considered buying Shahr-e Qods Stadium, but the deal fell through due to Persepolis' poor financial situation and the long distance between the city center and the stadium. In addition to a lack of interest from other teams playing their home games in this city, the stadium was not used many times.

In 2013 Paykan moved from Tehran to Shahr-e Qods. They played all their home games in the 2013–14 Azadegan League season in this Stadium. Paykan achieved promotion to Persian Gulf Pro League after 1–0 victory over Fajr Sepasi in Shahr-e Qods. Following the good support from the people of Shahr-e Qods, Paykan announced they will be playing in that city for the 2014–15 Persian Gulf Pro League season.

Because of a bad state of the stadium, it was renovated in 2014. Consequently, Paykan played their home games in the first half of the 2014–15 Persian Gulf Pro League season in Tehran's Takhti Stadium and Shahid Dastgerdi Stadium. Since January 2015 Paykan and Rah Ahan play their games in Shahr-e Qods.

== Safety problems ==
According to reports, the stadium has serious safety problems for employees and spectators in 2023 and 2024. Electrocution of employees, falling objects, injuries to employees, problems with ambulance and treatment, asphalt problems, problems with sound and electricity system, have been among the problems of the stadium.

== Location ==
The stadium is located in Shahr-e Qods, near Karaj.
