= Takhti Stadium (Khorramabad) =

Football stadium in Khorramabad, Iran

Takhti Stadium Khorramabad
- Takhti Khorramabad
- Interactive map of Takhti Stadium Khorramabad
- Location: Khorramabad, Iran
- Coordinates: 33°53′55.4″N 48°44′27.7″E
- Owner: Municipality of Khorramabad
- Operator: Municipality of Khorramabad
- Capacity: 8,000
- Field size: 105 × 68 m

Construction
- Groundbreaking: 1960
- Opened: 1976

Tenant
- Kheybar Khorramabad (2005–present)

The Takhti Stadium Khorramabad (Persian: ورزشگاه تختی خرم‌آباد) is a football stadium in Khorramabad, Lorestan, Iran with a 8,000 seating capacity. Takhti Stadium is home venue of Kheybar Khorramabad after opening in 2005. It is named after Gholamreza Takhti.

== Building ==
The stadium holds 8,000 people and has green seats. The stadium is located near to the Zagros Mountains.

== Events ==
The stadium hosts all home games of Kheybar Khorramabad in Azadegan League. Furthermore, it hosts some cultural events.
