= Shahid Soleimani Stadium (Shahr-e Babak) =

Football stadium in Shahr-e Babak, Kerman, Iran

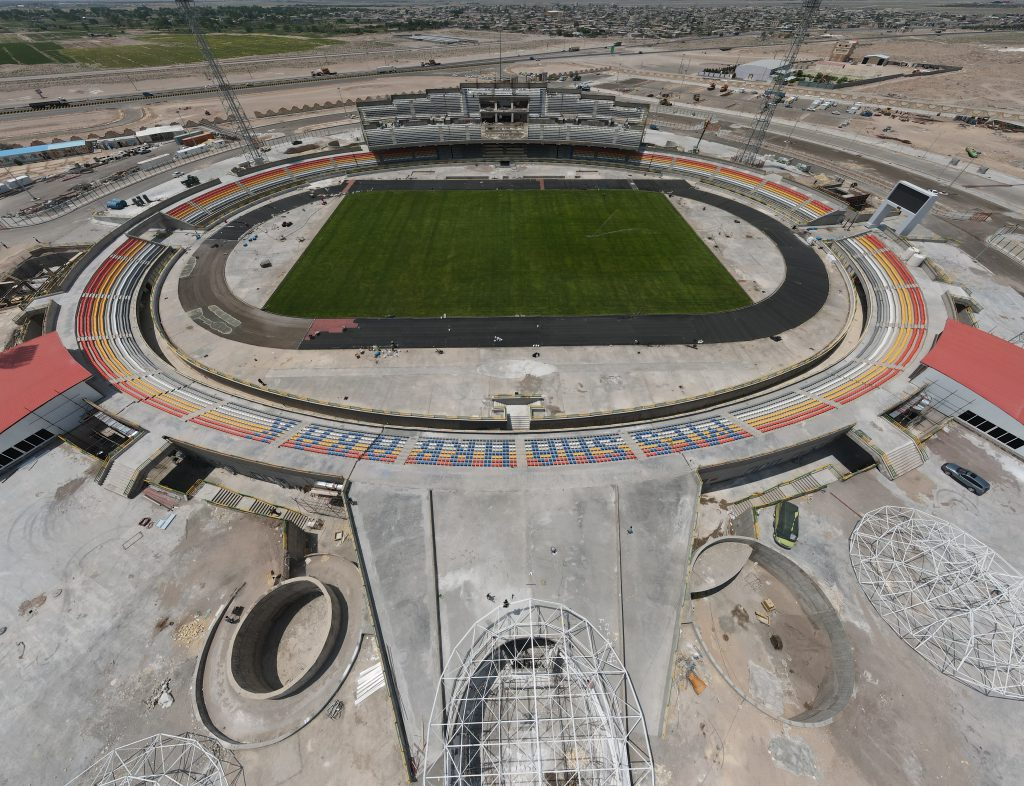
- Interactive map of Shahid Soleimani Stadium
- Full name: Shahid Soleimani Stadium
- Location: Shahr-e Babak, Kerman, Iran
- Coordinates: 30.1523°N 55.1027°E
- Owner: Mes Shahr-e Babak F.C.
- Operator: Mes Shahr-e Babak F.C.
- Capacity: 10,000

Construction
- Groundbreaking: 2007
- Built: 2007–2025
- Opened: 2025

Tenant
- Mes Shahr-e Babak F.C.

Shahid Soleimani Stadium (Persian: ورزشگاه شهید سلیمانی) is a football stadium in Shahr-e Babak, Kerman province, Iran. It serves as the home venue of Mes Shahr-e Babak F.C..

== Facilities ==
The Shohada-ye Mes Shahr-e Babak Sports Complex is a multi-purpose sports complex equipped with professional facilities. In addition to the 10,000-seat main football stadium, the complex includes a 1,000-seat football stadium for youth teams, a multi-purpose indoor arena with a capacity of 2,000 spectators, a 25-metre competition swimming pool, as well as training grounds and other sports infrastructure.

The complex also features an amphitheatre and facilities for electronic and educational classes.
