= Mehdi Tartar =

Iranian association football coach (born 1972)

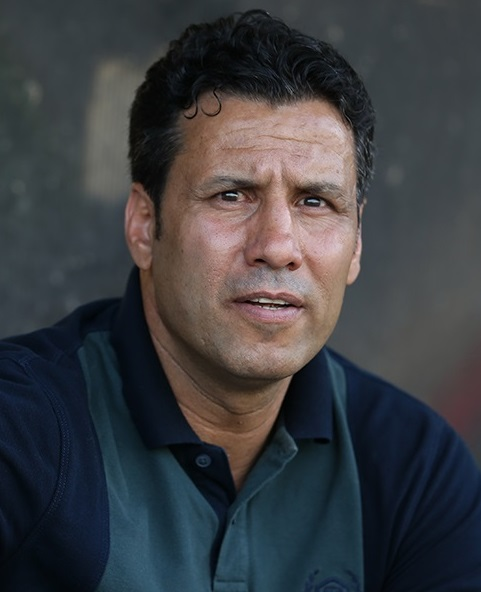

Personal information
- Date of birth: 24 September 1972 (age 54)
- Place of birth: Tehran, Iran
- Height: 1.81 m (5 ft 11 in)
- Position: Midfielder

Team information
- Current team: Persepolis (manager)

Senior career*
Years	Team	Apps	(Gls)
1991–1993	PAS Tehran	21	(0)
1993–1994	Sepahan	13	(0)
1994–1996	Bahman		
1996–1998	PAS Tehran	28	(0)
1998–1999	Tractor Sazi	9	(0)
1999–2003	Persepolis	45	(0)
2003–2005	Aboomoslem	56	(2)
2005–2009	Rah Ahan	103	(7)

Managerial career
- 2009: Rah Ahan
- 2009–2010: Rah Ahan
- 2010: Persepolis (assistant)
- 2010–2011: Rah Ahan
- 2012: Damash Gilan
- 2012: Gahar Zagros
- 2014: Gostaresh
- 2014–2015: Saba Qom
- 2015–2016: Rah Ahan
- 2016–2019: Pars Jonoubi
- 2019–2020: Naft Masjed Soleyman
- 2020–2021: Paykan
- 2021–2023: Zob Ahan
- 2023–2024: Malavan
- 2024–2026: Gol Gohar
- 2026–: Persepolis
- * Club domestic league appearances and goals

Mehdi Tartar (Persian: مهدی تارتار; born 24 September 1972) is an Iranian football coach and former player who manages Persepolis in Persian Gulf Pro League.

In September 2010 he was appointed manager of Iran Pro League team Rah Ahan after a spell as assistant at Persepolis but was sacked by the club on July 14, 2011. Tartar was appointed as the head coach of Gahar Zagros for the season 2012–13 of Iran Pro League but he resigned from his position due to the financial problems the club was facing with in that time. He is son-in-law of Firouz Karimi, Iranian football head coach.

== Career statistics ==
Last update June 3, 2010

Club performance			League		Cup		Continental		Total	
Season	Club	League	Apps	Goals	Apps	Goals	Apps	Goals	Apps	Goals
Iran			League		Hazfi Cup		Asia		Total	
1999–00	Persepolis	Azadegan League	10	0	2	0	0	0	12	0
2000–01	Persepolis	Azadegan League	6	0	0	0	3	0	9	0
2001–02	Persepolis	Persian Gulf Cup	19	0	3	0	-	-	22	0
2002–03	Persepolis	Persian Gulf Cup	9	0			3	0		
2003–04	Aboomoslem	Persian Gulf Cup		2			-	-		
2004–05	Aboomoslem	Persian Gulf Cup		0			-	-		
2005–06	Rah Ahan	Persian Gulf Cup	28	2			-	-		
2006–07	Rah Ahan	Persian Gulf Cup	27	4			-	-		
2007–08	Rah Ahan	Persian Gulf Cup	22	1			-	-		
2008–09	Rah Ahan	Persian Gulf Cup	26	0			-	-		
Total	Iran			9			6	0		
Career total				9			6	0		

== Managerial statistics ==
As of 20 November 2026

Managerial record by team and tenure
Team	Nat.	From	To	Record					Ref.
Team	Nat.	From	To	G	W	D	L	Win %	Ref.
Persepolis	(Iran)	5 July 2026		13	8	2	3	61.54	
Career Total	(Iran)			13	8	2	3	61.54	

== Honours ==
=== Player ===
Pas

- Iranian Football League runner-up: 1997–98

Persepolis

- Iranian Football League: 1998–99, 1999–2000, 2001–02
- Hazfi Cup: 1998–99

Aboumoslem

- Hazfi Cup runner-up: 2004–05

=== Manager ===
Rah Ahan

- Hazfi Cup runner-up: 2008–09

Pars Jam

- Azadegan League: 2016–17

=== Individual ===
- Azadegan League Manager of the Season: 2016–17
- Navad Manager of the Month: August 2017
