= F.C. Kheybar Khorramabad =

Iranian football club

Kheybar Khorramabad خیبر خرم آباد
- Full name: Football Club Kheybar Khorramabad
- Short name: FC Kheybar
- Founded: 1984; 42 years ago
- Ground: Takhti Khorramabad, Khorramabad, Iran
- Capacity: 8,000
- Owner: Masoud Abdi
- Chairman: Ehsan Nasser
- Head Coach: Faraz Kamalvand
- League: Persian Gulf Pro League
- 2025–26: Persian Gulf Pro League, 9th of 16
- Website: fc-kheybar.com
Home colours	Away colours

Football Club Kheybar Khorramabad is a football club in Khorramabad city, Iran, which was established in 1984. As of 2025, this club currently plays in the Persian Gulf Pro League, the highest football tier in Iran. The current owner of this club is Masoud Abdi.

== History ==
Kheybar Khorramabad Football Club is an Iranian football club located in Khorramabad city. The club was established in 1984.

== Players ==
=== First-team squad ===
Note: Flags indicate national team as defined under FIFA eligibility rules; some limited exceptions apply. Players may hold more than one non-FIFA nationality.

No.	Pos.	Nation	Player
1	GK	IRI	Ehsan Moradian
3	DF	IRI	Erfan Ghahremani
4	DF	IRI	Sobhan Pasandideh
6	DF	IRI	Taha Shariati
7	MF	IRI	Hamidreza Taherkhani
8	MF	IRI	Fardin Yousefi
10	FW	IRI	Isa Moradi
11	MF	IRI	Hossein Shenani
12	GK	IRI	Mohammadreza Dinarvand ^{U25}
14	MF	IRI	Sina Khadempour
15	DF	IRI	Masoud Mohebi ^{U21}
16	FW	IRI	Mehdi Abdi
17	MF	IRI	Hamid Haji Aghaei
19	DF	IRI	Mehrdad Ghanbari (Captain)
20	FW	IRI	Amir Reza Teymouri
21	MF	IRI	Mohammad Salehi ^{U23}

No.	Pos.	Nation	Player
22	DF	IRI	Sajjad Danaei
23	MF	IRI	Ali Khanzadi
30	MF	IRI	Parham Hassani ^{U19}
31	GK	IRI	Abolfazl Hashemi
33	GK	IRI	Amir Reza Najafpour ^{U23}
44	DF	IRI	Farshad Mohammadi Mehr
66	MF	IRI	Arian Maali ^{U19}
70	MF	IRI	Hamidreza Zarouni ^{U21}
76	MF	IRI	Amir Hossein Farsi ^{U19}
77	MF	IRI	Abouzar Safarzadeh
78	MF	IRI	Mehran Amiri
80	DF	IRI	Emad Hadavand ^{U21}
83	MF	IRI	Abolfazl Derikvand ^{U23}
88	MF	IRI	Esmaeil Babaei
99	FW	IRI	Alireza Maleki (on loan from Nassaji Mazandaran)

== Supporters and fans ==
Kheybar Khorramabad, also known as Kheybar Lortbaran, is one of the most popular teams in Lorestan province, whose fans are not limited only to Lorestan province, but also has fans in all Lurish provinces.

== Stadium ==
The club currently plays its games at the 8,000-seat Takhti Khorramabad.

In the future, the club plans to play its games in the stadium named Lor Arena. The stadium was completed in 2024 with a capacity of 15,000 seats. The stadium has now been handed over to Kheybar and the club is planning to expand it to 23,000 seats.

== Club managers ==
- (Iran) Ali Nikbakht (2015–2016)
- (Iran) Davoud Haghdoust (2016–2017)
- (Iran) Mehrdad Khademi (2017–2020)
- (Iran) Omid Ravankhah (2020)
- (Iran) Abdollah Veisi (2020–2021)
- (Iran) Mohsen Ashouri (2021)
- (Iran) Faraz Kamalvand (2021–2023)
- (Iran) Mohammad Reza Mohajeri (2023–2024)

== National titles ==
- Azadegan League

Champion (1): 2023–24

- Hazfi Cup

Runner Up (1): 1986–87,

- 2nd Division

Third place : 2014–15, Promoted to 2015–16 Azadegan League
