= 2026–27 Persian Gulf Pro League =

26th season of Persian Gulf Pro League

Persian Gulf Pro League
- Season: 2026–27
- Dates: 18 August 2026 –
- Matches: 80
- Goals: 156 (1.95 per match)
- Biggest home win: Sepahan 6–1 Fajr Sepasi (8 October 2026)
- Biggest away win: Sanat Naft 0–3 Foolad (24 August 2026); Mes Shahr-e Babak 0–3 Persepolis (19 October 2026)
- Highest scoring: Sepahan 6–1 Fajr Sepasi (8 October 2026)
- Longest winning run: Tractor (4)
- Longest unbeaten run: Esteghlal (10)
- Longest winless run: Mes Shahr-e Babak (9)
- Longest losing run: Gol Gohar, Sanat Naft (3)

The 2026–27 Persian Gulf Pro League is the 45th season of Iran's Football League and 26th as Persian Gulf Pro League.

Mes Rafsanjan were relegated from the previous season, and with the promotion of Nassaji Mazandaran, Mes Shahr-e Babak and Sanat Naft Abadan from the 2025–26 Azadegan League, the league has been expanded from 16 to 18 teams for the 2026–27 season.

== Teams ==
The league will consist of the following 18 clubs:

=== Promotion and relegation (pre-season) ===
Promoted from 2025–26 Azadegan League	Relegated from Play-off 2025–26 Persian Gulf Pro League
Nassaji Mazandaran; Mes Shahr-e Babak; Sanat Naft Abadan	Mes Rafsanjan

=== Stadiums and locations ===
Locations of the 2026–27 Persian Gulf Pro League teams
Location of Tehran teams in 2026–27 Persian Gulf Pro League

Team	Location	Stadium	Capacity
Aluminium	Arak	Imam Khomeini	15,000
Chadormalou	Ardakan	Shahid Nassiri	15,000
Esteghlal	Tehran	Azadi	78,116
Esteghlal Khuzestan	Ahvaz	Takhti،Ghadir Stadium	10,000
Fajr Sepasi	Shiraz	Pars	50,000
Foolad	Ahvaz	Foolad Arena	30,655
Gol Gohar	Sirjan	Shahid Qasem Soleimani	9,000
Kheybar	Khorramabad	Takhti Khorramabad	8,000
Malavan	Bandar-e Anzali	Sirous Ghayeghran	9,000
Mes Shahr-e Babak	Shahr-e Babak	Shohadaye Mes Shahr-e Babak	10,000
Nassaji	Qaem Shahr	Vatani Stadium	15,000
Paykan	Tehran	Shohadaye Shahr-e Qods Stadium	8,000
Persepolis	Tehran	Azadi	78,116
Sanat Naft	Abadan	Takhti	20,000
Sepahan	Isfahan	Naghsh-e-Jahan	75,000
Shams Azar	Qazvin	Sardar Azadegan	15,000
Tractor	Tabriz	Yadegar-e Emam	66,833
Zob Ahan	Fooladshahr	Fooladshahr	20,000

=== Personnel and kits ===
Note: Flags indicate national team as has been defined under FIFA eligibility rules. Players may hold more than one non-FIFA nationality.

Team	Manager	Captain	Kit manufacturer	Main kit sponsor	Other kit sponsor(s)
Aluminium	(Iran) Pirouz Ghorbani	(Iran) Amir Noori	Sina Sport	IRALCO	
Chadormalou	(Iran) Saeid Akhbari	(Iran) Saeid Mohammadifard	Yousef Jameh	CMIC	
Esteghlal	(Iran) Sohrab Bakhtiarizadeh	(Iran) Rouzbeh Cheshmi	Start	PGPIC	
Esteghlal Khuzestan	(Iran) Amir Khalifeh-Asl	(Iran) Hamid Bou Hamdan	Merooj	INSIG	
Fajr Sepasi	(Iran) Mehdi Rajabzadeh	(Iran) Masoud Rigi	Merooj		
Foolad	(Iran) Hamid Motahari	(Iran) Sasan Ansari	Merooj	KSC	
Gol Gohar	(Iran) Mehdi Rahmati	(Iran) Ali Asghar Ashouri	Sina Sport	Gol Gohar mine	
Kheybar	(Iran) Faraz Kamalvand	(Iran) Mehrdad Ghanbari	Sina Sport	Foulad Amir (Steel)	
Malavan	(Iran) Maziar Zare	(Iran) Mahyar Zahmatkesh	Merooj		
Mes Shahr-e Babak	(Iran) Mojtaba Hosseini	(Iran) Mohammad Javad Pouravaz	Sina Sport	NICICO	
Nassaji	(Iran) Saeid Daghighi	(Iran) Sadegh Albousabih	Uhlsport	Varesh Airlines	
Paykan	(Iran) Saket Elhami	(Iran) Amir Hossein Gholami	Yousef Jameh	IKCO	
Persepolis	(Iran) Mehdi Tartar	(Iran) Hossein Kanaanizadegan	Yousef Jameh	Bank Shahr	Daria (Telecommunications)
Sanat Naft	(Iran) Sirous Pourmousavi	(Iran) Taleb Rikani	Darik	Arvand Free Zone	
Sepahan	(Iran) Moharram Navidkia	(Iran) Ehsan Hajsafi	Yousef Jameh	Mobarakeh Steel	Aratile Ceramic
Shams Azar	(Iran) Vahid Rezaei	(Iran) Mohammad Nejadmehdi	AR	Shams Azar Macaron	
Tractor	(Iran) Javad Nekounam	(Iran) Shojae Khalilzadeh	Start	ATA Airlines	
Zob Ahan	(Iran) Mohammad Rabiei	(Iran) Jalaleddin Alimohammadi	Yousef Jameh	Refah Bank	

=== Foreign players ===
Club	Player 1	Player 2	Player 3	Player 4	Player 5	Former players
Aluminium Arak						
Chadormalou	(Brazil) Edson Mardden	(Ecuador) Renny Boboy	(Paraguay) Diego Torres	(Paraguay) Rodrigo Alborno		
Esteghlal	(Albania) Jasir Asani	(Uzbekistan) Jaloliddin Masharipov	(Uzbekistan) Rustam Ashurmatov			
Esteghlal Khuzestan						
Fajr Sepasi						
Foolad						
Gol Gohar	(Tunisia) Louay Ben Hassine					
Kheybar						
Malavan						
Mes Shahr-e Babak						
Nassaji						
Paykan						
Persepolis	(Republic of the Congo) Thievy Bifouma	(Hungary) Dániel Gera	(Montenegro) Marko Bakić	(Uzbekistan) Igor Sergeev	(Uzbekistan) Oston Urunov	
Sanat Naft	(Gabon) Eric Bocoum					
Sepahan	(Portugal) Ricardo Alves					
Shams Azar						
Tractor	(Croatia) Igor Postonjski	(Croatia) Tibor Halilović	(Croatia) Tomislav Štrkalj	(Uzbekistan) Odiljon Hamrobekov		
Zob Ahan						

== League table ==
Pos	Team	Pld	W	D	L	GF	GA	GD	Pts	Qualification or relegation
1	Sepahan	12	8	2	2	23	7	+16	26	Qualification for the 2027–28 AFC Champions League Elite league stage
2	Persepolis	12	7	2	3	20	7	+13	23	Qualification for the 2027–28 AFC Champions League Elite league stage
3	Foolad	12	6	5	1	12	6	+6	23	Qualification for the 2027–28 AFC Champions League Elite league stage
4	Esteghlal	10	5	5	0	12	3	+9	20	Qualification for the 2027–28 AFC Champions League Two group stage
5	Tractor	10	6	2	2	12	5	+7	20	
6	Aluminium Arak	12	4	5	3	12	9	+3	17	
7	Fajr Sepasi	11	4	5	2	12	13	−1	17	
8	Chadormalou	12	4	5	3	12	15	−3	17	
9	Kheybar	11	3	5	3	14	13	+1	14	
10	Gol Gohar	10	4	1	5	10	9	+1	13	
11	Paykan	11	3	4	4	10	11	−1	13	
12	Nassaji	11	2	5	4	7	10	−3	11	
13	Malavan	12	3	3	6	12	18	−6	10 (Note: In the match between Malavan and Tractor, Malavan, as the host of the match, had two points deducted due to their inability to control the situation and prevent inappropriate chants by the spectators.)	
14	Esteghlal Khuzestan	11	2	4	5	7	14	−7	10	
15	Sanat Naft	11	2	4	5	6	15	−9	10	Relegation to 2027–28 Azadegan League
16	Zob Ahan	11	1	6	4	6	10	−4	9	Relegation to 2027–28 Azadegan League
17	Shams Azar	11	1	4	6	7	13	−6	7	Relegation to 2027–28 Azadegan League
18	Mes Shahr-e Babak	12	0	5	7	7	23	−16	5	Relegation to 2027–28 Azadegan League

Updated to match(es) played on 6 November 2026. Source: Iran Football League Organization - League Full Table
Rules for classification: 1) Points; 2) Head-to-head points; 3) Head-to-head goal difference; 4) Total goal difference; 5) Total goals scored; 6) Fair-play points.
(Note: Head-to-head record is used only after all the matches between the teams in question have been played).

== Results ==
Home \ Away	ALU	CHA	EST	ESK	FJR	FOL	GOL	KHE	MLV	MSB	NSJ	PAY	PRS	SNA	SEP	SAQ	TRC	ZOB
Aluminium	—	0–0	0–0	-	-	-	-	2–2	1–1	-	-	-	-	-	-	-	-	0–0
Chadormalou	-	—	1–1	-	-	-	-	2–2	-	-	-	-	-	-	0–2	1–0	0–2	-
Esteghlal	-	-	—	-	-	-	1–0	-	-	4–0	-	1–0	1–1	-	2–0	-	-	-
Esteghlal Khuzestan	0–2	1–1	-	—	-	-	-	-	-	-	1–1	-	-	-	-	2–0	1–0	-
Fajr Sepasi	2–1	-	-	-	—	-	-	-	-	1–1	-	2–0	-	0–0	-	-	-	0–0
Foolad	-	-	0–0	-	1–0	—	-	-	-	2–1	0–0	-	-	-	-	1–1	-	-
Gol Gohar	0–2	3–0	-	3–0	-	-	—	0–1	-	-	1–0	-	-	-	-	-	-	-
Kheybar	-	-	-	2–1	1–1	2–0	-	—	-	-	-	2–3	0–0	-	-	-	-	-
Malavan	-	-	-	-	0–1	1–2	-	-	—	-	0–1	-	-	-	-	-	3–0	2–1
Mes Shahr-e Babak	-	-	-	-	-	-	-	1–1	1–2	—	1–1	-	0–3	0–0	-	-	-	-
Nassaji	-	-	0–1	-	2–2	-	-	1–0	-	-	—	-	-	-	-	0–2	-	1–1
Paykan	-	-	-	0–0	-	-	0–0	-	1–1	-	-	—	-	2–0	-	1–1	-	-
Persepolis	-	-	-	4–1	-	0–1	-	-	3–0	-	-	-	—	3–1	-	-	-	2–0
Sanat Naft	2–1	1–2	-	-	-	0–3	-	-	1–1	-	-	-	-	—	0–0	-	-	-
Sepahan	-	-	-	1–0	6–1	-	2–0	-	-	4–0	-	-	-	-	—	-	0–2	-
Shams Azar	1–2	-	-	-	-	-	2–3	-	-	-	-	-	0–2	-	0–0	—	0–0	-
Tractor	-	-	1–1	-	-	-	1–0	-	-	-	-	2–0	1–0	3–0	-	-	—	-
Zob Ahan	-	1–2	-	-	-	0–0	-	-	-	1–1	-	1–0	-	-	1–2	-	-	—

Updated to match(es) played on 28 October 2026. Source: Iran League
Legend: Blue = home team win; Yellow = draw; Red = away team win.
For upcoming matches, an "a" indicates there is an article about the rivalry between the two participants.

== Positions by round ==
The table lists the positions of teams after each week of matches. In order to preserve chronological evolvements, any postponed matches are not included to the round at which they were originally scheduled, but added to the full round they were played immediately afterwards.

Team ╲ Round	1	2	3	4	5	6	7	8	9	10	11	12	13	14	15	16	17	18	19	20	21	22	23	24	25	26	27	28	29	30	31	32	33	34
Aluminium	2	4	4	4	3	4	5	6	6	6																								
Chadormalou	14	14	18	18	18	15	11	11	9	10																								
Esteghlal	1	2	1	2	2	3	2	3	2	3																								
Esteghlal Khuzestan	15	18	17	16	17	18	15	16	17	14																								
Fajr Sepasi	7	9	7	7	5	8	7	8	8	8																								
Foolad	8	10	6	6	9	6	6	5	5	5																								
Gol Gohar	6	6	3	5	6	9	8	7	7	9																								
Kheybar	9	8	11	12	8	12	12	12	10	7																								
Malavan	10	5	8	11	15	11	13	13	11	11																								
Mes Shahr-e Babak	18	16	14	15	16	16	17	17	18	18	18																							
Nassaji	13	17	15	17	13	10	10	10	12	12																								
Paykan	16	15	9	9	12	7	9	9	13	13	13																							
Persepolis	3	1	5	3	4	2	3	1	1	1																								
Sanat Naft	11	11	13	14	14	17	18	18	16	17																								
Sepahan	4	7	10	8	7	5	4	4	3	2																								
Shams Azar	17	13	16	10	11	14	16	15	14	16																								
Tractor	5	3	2	1	1	1	1	2	4	4																								
Zob Ahan	12	12	12	13	10	13	14	14	15	15																								

Leader : AFC Champions League Elite
AFC Champions League Elite
AFC Champions League Two
Relegation to the Azadegan League

Updated to match(es) played on 28 October 2026. Source: Iran League

== Season statistics ==
As of 21 November 2026

=== Top scorers ===
Rank	Player	Club	Goals
1	(Iran) Amirhossein Hosseinzadeh	Tractor	7
2	(Iran) Kasra Taheri	Sepahan	6
3	(Iran) Ali Alipour	Persepolis	5
4	(Iran) Javad Aghaeipour	Nassaji	4
4	(Albania) Jasir Asani	Esteghlal	4
4	(Republic of the Congo) Thievy Bifouma	Persepolis	4
4	(Iran) Amir Hossein Farsi	Kheybar	4
4	(Iran) Ehsan Hajsafi	Sepahan	4
4	(Iran) Mehdi Limouchi	Sepahan	4
4	(Iran) Mohammadmehdi Mohebi	Persepolis	4
4	(Iran) Aref Rostami	Est. Khuzestan	4
4	(Iran) Yadegar Rostami	Fajr Sepasi	4
4	(Iran) Erfan Shahriari	Malavan	4

=== Top assists ===
Rank	Player	Club	Assists
1	(Iran) Omid Noorafkan	Sepahan	6
2	(Iran) Esmaeil Babaei	Kheybar	4
2	(Iran) Ahmad Reza Zendehrouh	Gol Gohar	4
4	(Iran) Ali Alipour	Persepolis	3
4	(Iran) Majid Eidi	Persepolis	3
4	(Iran) Mohammad Hossein Eslami	Esteghlal	3
4	(Iran) Ehsan Hajsafi	Sepahan	3
4	(Iran) Amir Ali Madadizadeh	Paykan	3
4	(Iran) Reza Mahmoudabadi	Chadormalou	3
4	(Iran) Abolfazl Moredi	Fajr Sepasi	3
4	(Iran) Ali Shojaei	Zob Ahan	3

=== Clean sheets ===
Rank	Player	Club	Clean sheets
1	(Iran) Habib Far Abbasi	Esteghlal	7
1	(Iran) Hossein Hosseini	Sepahan	7
1	(Iran) Mohammad Khalifeh	Aluminium Arak	7
1	(Iran) Hamed Lak	Foolad	7
1	(Iran) Payam Niazmand	Persepolis	7
1	(Iran) Davoud Noushi Soufiani	Zob Ahan	7
7	(Iran) Alireza Beiranvand	Tractor / Fajr Sepasi	6
