= 2025–26 Persian Gulf Pro League =

Persian Gulf Pro League
- Season: 2025–26
- Dates: 18 August 2025 – 27 February 2026
- Champions: Not Completed
- Relegated: Mes Rafsanjan
- Champions League Elite: Esteghlal; Tractor
- Champions League 2: Gol Gohar
- Matches: 175
- Goals: 311 (1.78 per match)
- Top goalscorer: Amirhossein Hosseinzadeh (11 goals)
- Best goalkeeper: Alireza Beiranvand; Alireza Jafarpour (11 clean sheets)
- Biggest home win: Chadormalou 5–1 Gol Gohar (20 February 2026)
- Biggest away win: Tractor 4-1 Aluminium Arak (3 September 2025); Persepolis 3-0 Esteghlal Khuzestan (7 November 2025); Tractor 4-1 Mes Rafsanjan (22 January 2026)
- Highest scoring: Shams Azar 4–4 Chadormalou (26 August 2025)
- Longest winning run: Sepahan (8 matches)
- Longest unbeaten run: Esteghlal (11 matches)
- Longest winless run: Aluminium (12 matches)
- Longest losing run: Aluminium (4 matches)
- Highest attendance: 50,000; Sepahan 0–1 Persepolis (25 August 2025)
- Lowest attendance: 0 (without spectators); 59 matches
- Total attendance: 651,300
- Average attendance: 5,473 (excluding matches played behind closed doors)
- All statistics correct as of 27 February 2026.

The 2025–26 Persian Gulf Pro League was the 43nd season of Iran's Football League and 25th as Persian Gulf Pro League since its establishment in 2001.

The season started on 18 August 2025 and was originally scheduled to end on 15 May 2026, but the league has been suspended due to the 2026 Iran war. The league is expected to resume after the 2026 FIFA World Cup, but was eventually abandoned.

== Teams ==
=== Promotion and relegation (pre-season) ===
A total of sixteen teams contest the league, including fourteen sides from the 2024–25 season and two promoted from the 2024–25 Azadegan League. This includes the two top teams from the Azadegan League. Fajr Sepasi and Paykan. They replaced Nassaji and Havadar.

Promoted from 2024–25 Azadegan League	Relegated from 2024–25 Persian Gulf Pro League
Fajr Sepasi; Paykan	Nassaji; Havadar

=== Stadiums and locations ===
Locations of the 2025–26 Persian Gulf Pro League teams
Location of Tehran teams in 2025–26 Persian Gulf Pro League

Team	Location	Stadium	Capacity
Aluminium	Arak	Imam Khomeini	15,000
Chadormalou	Ardakan	Shahid Nassiri	15,000
Esteghlal	Tehran	Azadi	78,116
Esteghlal Khuzestan	Ahvaz	Takhti	10,000
Fajr Sepasi Shiraz	Shiraz	Pars	50,000
Foolad	Ahvaz	Foolad Arena	30,655
Gol Gohar	Sirjan	Shahid Qasem Soleimani	9,000
Kheybar	Khorramabad	Takhti Khorramabad	8,000
Malavan	Bandar-e Anzali	Sirous Ghayeghran	9,000
Mes Rafsanjan	Rafsanjan	Shohadaye Mes	10,000
Paykan	Tehran	Shohadaye Shahr-e Qods Stadium	8,000
Persepolis	Tehran	Azadi	78,116
Sepahan	Isfahan	Naghsh-e-Jahan	75,000
Shams Azar	Qazvin	Sardar Azadegan	15,000
Tractor	Tabriz	Yadegar-e Emam	66,833
Zob Ahan	Fooladshahr	Fooladshahr	20,000

=== Personnel and kits ===
Note: Flags indicate national team as has been defined under FIFA eligibility rules. Players may hold more than one non-FIFA nationality.

Team	Manager	Captain	Kit manufacturer	Main kit sponsor
Aluminium	(Iran) Mojtaba Hosseini	(Iran) Amir Nouri	Sinasport	IRALCO
Chadormalou	(Iran) Mohammad Saeid Akhbari	(Iran) Ali Taheran	Darik	CMIC
Esteghlal	(Iran) Sohrab Bakhtiarizadeh	(Iran) Rouzbeh Cheshmi	Yousef Jameh	Artaban Motors Group
Esteghlal Khuzestan	(Iran) Amir Khalifeh-Asl	(Iran) Hamid Bou Hamdan	Merooj	Zest (Mattress)
Fajr Sepasi	(Iran) Pirouz Ghorbani	(Iran) Saeed Zare	Merooj	Sham Sham (Meat products)
Foolad	(Iran) Hamid Motahari	(Iran) Sasan Ansari	Yousef Jameh	KSC
Gol Gohar	(Iran) Mehdi Tartar	(Iran) Ali Asghar Ashouri	Yousef Jameh	Gol Gohar mine
Kheybar	(Iran) Mehdi Rahmati	(Iran) Mehrdad Ghanbari	Sinasport	Foulad Amir (Steel)
Malavan	(Iran) Maziar Zare	(Iran) Mahyar Zahmatkesh	Start	Ronix (Industrial tools)
Mes Rafsanjan	(Iran) Mojtaba Jabbari	(Iran) Milad Fakhreddini	Start	NICICO
Paykan	(Iran) Saeed Daghighi	(Iran) Mohsen Azarbad	Alabaft	IKCO
Persepolis	(Brazil) Osmar Loss	(Iran) Omid Alishah	Merooj	Daria (Telecommunications)
Sepahan	(Iran) Moharram Navidkia	(Iran) Mohammad Karimi	Start	Mobarakeh Steel Company
Shams Azar	(Iran) Vahid Rezaei	(Iran) Mehdi Mohammadi	Yousef Jameh	Shams Azar Macaron
Tractor	(Croatia) Dragan Skočić	(Iran) Shojae Khalilzadeh	Start	ATA Airlines
Zob Ahan	(Iran) Ghasem Haddadifar	(Iran) Ehsan Pahlevan	Yousef Jameh	TTP (Commercial Company)

1. On the back of shirt.
2. On the sleeves.
3. On the shorts.

=== Managerial changes ===
Team	Outgoing manager	Manner of departure	Date of vacancy	Position in the table	Incoming manager	Date of appointment
Zob Ahan	(Iran) Mohammad Rabiei	Mutual consent	17 May 2025	Pre-season	(Iran) Ghasem Haddadifar	17 May 2025
Kheybar	(Iran) Saeid Daghighi	Mutual consent	23 May 2025	Pre-season	(Iran) Mohammad Rabiei	23 May 2025
Paykan	(Iran) Sirous Dinmohammadi	Mutual consent	29 May 2025	Pre-season	(Iran) Saeid Daghighi	29 May 2025
Esteghlal	(Iran) Mojtaba Jabbari	Interim	18 June 2025	Pre-season	(Portugal) Ricardo Sá Pinto	18 June 2025
Mes Rafsanjan	(Iran) Sirous Pourmousavi	Disagreement	1 June 2025	Pre-season	(Iran) Rasoul Khatibi	21 July 2025
Sepahan	(France) Patrice Carteron	Resigned	25 June 2025	Pre-season	(Iran) Moharram Navidkia	29 June 2025
Kheybar	(Iran) Mohammad Rabiei	Resigned	30 June 2025	Pre-season	(Iran) Mehdi Rahmati	8 July 2025
Persepolis	(Turkey) İsmail Kartal	Resigned	1 July 2025	Pre-season	(Iran) Vahid Hashemian	4 July 2025
Shams Azar	(Iran) Mehdi Rahmati	Resigned	3 July 2025	Pre-season	(Iran) Vahid Rezaei	3 July 2025
Persepolis	(Iran) Vahid Hashemian	Sacked	25 October 2025	7th	(Brazil) Osmar Loss	28 October 2025
Mes Rafsanjan	(Iran) Rasoul Khatibi	Sacked	4 December 2025	16th	(Iran) Mojtaba Jabbari	7 December 2025
Esteghlal	(Portugal) Ricardo Sá Pinto	Sacked	20 February 2026		(Iran) Sohrab Bakhtiarizadeh	22 February 2026

=== Foreign players ===
The number of foreign players is increased to eight per Persian Gulf Pro League team, including a slot for a player from AFC countries.
In bold: Players that have been capped for their national team.

Club	Player 1	Player 2	Player 3	Player 4	Player 5	Player 6	Player 7	AFC player	Former players
Aluminium									
Chadormalou	(Brazil) Edson Mardden	(Brazil) Vitão	(Ecuador) Renny Simisterra	(Ecuador) Segundo Portocarrero	(Paraguay) Mario Otazú	(Paraguay) Diego Torres	(Paraguay) Mauro Caballero		
Esteghlal	(Albania) **Jasir Asani**	(Haiti) **Duckens Nazon**	(Mali) **Moussa Djenepo**	(Morocco) **Munir El Haddadi**	(Spain) Antonio Adan	(Uzbekistan) **Jaloliddin Masharipov**		(Uzbekistan) **Rustam Ashurmatov**	(Gabon) **Didier Ndong**
Esteghlal Khuzestan									
Fajr Sepasi									
Foolad	(Argentina) Gustavo Blanco	(Brazil) Matheus Costa							(Uzbekistan) **Utkir Yusupov**
Gol Gohar	(Brazil) Marcos Miranda	(Gabon) **Eric Bocoum**	(Gabon) **Jeremie Obounet**	(Serbia) Nemanja Tomašević				(Tajikistan) **Amadoni Kamolov**	
Kheybar									
Malavan									
Mes Rafsanjan	(Bosnia and Herzegovina) Mirzad Mehanović	(North Macedonia) **Stefan Ashkovski**						(South Korea) **Lee Ki-je**	(Brazil) Matheus Costa (Bosnia and Herzegovina) **Numan Kurdić**
Paykan									
Persepolis	(Republic of the Congo) **Thievy Bifouma**	(Hungary) **Dániel Gera**	(Montenegro) **Marko Bakić**	(Uzbekistan) **Igor Sergeev**				(Uzbekistan) **Oston Urunov**	(Ivory Coast) **Serge Aurier**
Sepahan	(France) Enzo Crivelli	(Georgia (country)) **Giorgi Gvelesiani**	(Portugal) Ricardo Alves	(Spain) Iván Sánchez				(Tajikistan) **Vahdat Hanonov**	
Shams Azar									
Tractor	(Albania) Regi Lushkja	(Croatia) Domagoj Drožđek	(Croatia) Igor Postonjski	(Croatia) Tibor Halilović	(Croatia) Tomislav Štrkalj	(Serbia) **Aleksandar Sedlar**	(Sweden) Marko Johansson	(Uzbekistan) **Odiljon Hamrobekov**	
Zob Ahan									(Bosnia and Herzegovina) Dženan Zajmović

== League table ==
The league has been suspended due to the 2026 Iran war. As the league can only continue after the cut-off date for the 2026–27 AFC Club Competitions at June 30, the standings at the time of suspension will determine the clubs qualified for the Champions League Elite and Champions League Two.

Pos	Team	Pld	W	D	L	GF	GA	GD	Pts	Qualification or relegation
1	Esteghlal	22	11	8	3	29	16	+13	41	Qualification for the 2026–27 AFC Champions League Elite league stage
2	Tractor	22	10	9	3	30	12	+18	39	Qualification for the 2026–27 AFC Champions League Elite league stage
3	Sepahan	22	11	6	5	24	13	+11	39	
4	Gol Gohar	23	11	6	6	26	19	+7	39	Qualification for the 2026–27 AFC Champions League Two group stage (Note: 2025–26 Persian Gulf Pro League was abandoned due to the Iran-Israel war, and the AFC Champions League Two slot was determined through a play-off between the third to sixth-placed teams. The third-placed team (Sepahan Isfahan) failed to obtain club license required to enter the competition and was excluded from the play-offs. Consequently, a play-off was contested between the fourth to sixth-placed teams, with Chadormalu Ardakan emerging as the winner. However AFC had already received fourth-placed team Gol Gohar as the official replacement submitted by the Iran Football Federation before the play-offs.)
5	Persepolis	22	9	7	6	23	19	+4	34	
6	Chadormalou	22	8	8	6	22	21	+1	32	
7	Foolad	22	7	10	5	21	16	+5	31	
8	Fajr Sepasi	23	8	6	9	25	27	−2	30	
9	Kheybar	23	7	8	8	22	24	−2	29	
10	Malavan	22	7	8	7	13	21	−8	29	
11	Esteghlal Khuzestan	22	6	7	9	16	23	−7	25	
12	Paykan	23	5	9	9	15	21	−6	24	
13	Shams Azar	23	3	13	7	15	19	−4	22	
14	Aluminium Arak	22	5	7	10	14	21	−7	22	
15	Zob Ahan	21	3	10	8	12	19	−7	19	
16	Mes Rafsanjan (R)	22	3	6	13	13	29	−16	15	Qualification for the Promotion/relegation play-off

Updated to match(es) played on 22 February 2026. Source: Iran Football League Organization - League Full Table
Rules for classification: 1) Points; 2) Head-to-head points; 3) Head-to-head goal difference; 4) Total goal difference; 5) Total goals scored; 6) Fair-play points.
(Note: Head-to-head record is used only after all the matches between the teams in question have been played).
(R) Relegated

== Results ==
Home \ Away	ALU	CHA	EST	ESK	FJR	FOL	GOL	KHE	MLV	MES	PAY	PRS	SEP	SAQ	TRC	ZOB
Aluminium Arak	—	—	—	2–0	1–1	—	1–2	0–1	0–1	0–0	1–1	—	0–1	1–0	0–1	1–0
Chadormalou	1–0	—	1–1	3–1	—	1–0	0–3	2–1	0–0	—	2–0	0–0	—	2–1	—	0–0
Esteghlal	3–1	—	—	1–0	2–1	1–0	0–1	—	3–0	1–0	2–2	—	—	3–2	0–0	3–3
Esteghlal Khuzestan	1–1	—	1–0	—	1–0	1–1	0–1	0–1	—	2–0	0–0	—	0–2	1–1	—	2–0
Fajr Sepasi	—	1–2	0–3	1–2	—	1–2	1–0	2–1	—	1–1	—	2–1	—	1–0	2–1	1–0
Foolad	0–0	0–0	—	—	—	—	3–1	1–0	0–1	—	1–0	3–1	0–1	0–1	0–0	2–1
Gol Gohar	1–0	2–0	—	—	1–2	0–0	—	—	1–0	2–0	0–1	3–1	1–1	—	0–5	1–2
Kheybar	2–2	0–2	1–1	—	1–1	2–2	0–0	—	1–0	3–2	—	2–1	0–1	0–0	2–1	—
Malavan	—	1–0	—	2–1	0–4	2–2	0–2	1–0	—	2–1	—	1–0	1–1	0–0	1–1	—
Mes Rafsanjan	—	2–3	0–1	0–1	—	0–0	—	2–1	—	—	2–0	0–1	0–3	0–0	0–0	0–0
Paykan	0–1	0–0	1–0	1–1	2–2	—	—	0–0	1–0	0–2	—	0–1	0–0	0–1	—	2–0
Persepolis	1–0	1–0	0–0	3–0	1–1	1–1	1–1	1–2	0–0	—	—	—	2–1	—	—	2–0
Sepahan	—	1–0	1–2	3–1	2–0	—	1–1	1–0	0–0	—	2–1	0–1	—	—	1–2	0–0
Shams Azar	0–0	4–4	1–1	0–0	0–1	0–2	1–1	—	—	2–0	1–1	1–2	0–1	—	0–0	—
Tractor	4–1	3–1	0–1	0–0	0–0	—	1–0	—	3–0	4–1	2–1	1–1	1–0	—	—	—
Zob Ahan	0–1	—	0–0	—	2–1	1–1	—	1–1	0–0	2–0	0–1		—	0–0	0–0	—

Updated to match(es) played on 27 February 2026. Source: Iran League, Iplstats
Legend: Blue = home team win; Yellow = draw; Red = away team win.
For upcoming matches, an "a" indicates there is an article about the rivalry between the two participants.

== Asia play-offs ==
=== Bracket ===
Semi-final
June 26 – Tehran
Chadormalou (a.e.t.)	2
Persepolis	1

Final
June 29 – Tehran
Gol Gohar	0 (6)
Chadormalou (p)	0 (7)

=== Semi-final ===
June 26, 2026
20:30 IRST

Chadormalou	2–1 (a.e.t.)	Persepolis
Sadeghian 57'; Mahmoudabadi 120+3'	Report	Kazemian 28'

Shahid Dastgerdi Stadium, Tehran
Attendance: 0
Referee: Mooud Bonyadifard

=== Final ===
June 29, 2026
19:00 IRST

Gol Gohar	0−0 (a.e.t.)	Chadormalou
	Report
Penalties
Tikdari (penalty scored); Jafari (penalty missed); Alipour (penalty scored); Pourali (penalty scored); Shabani (penalty missed); Asadi (penalty scored); Akvan (penalty missed); Garousian (penalty scored); Abbasi (penalty scored); Shahrabadi (penalty missed); Sheikholeslami (penalty missed)	6−7	(penalty missed) Mahmoudabadi; (penalty scored) Safari; (penalty scored) Sadeghian; (penalty scored) Khosravi; (penalty missed) Bayat; (penalty scored) Hosseini; (penalty missed) Sedghi; (penalty scored) Ghojoghi; (penalty scored) Mashhadi; (penalty missed) Mohammadifard; (penalty scored) Arta

Shahid Dastgerdi Stadium, Tehran
Attendance: 0
Referee: Bijan Heydari

== Promotion/relegation play-off ==
July 22, 2026
18:45 IRST

Mes Rafsanjan	0 – 3	Naft Abadan

Shohada-ye Shahr-e Qods Stadium, Qods
Referee: Vahid Kazemi

== Positions by round ==
The table lists the positions of teams after each week of matches. In order to preserve chronological evolvements, any postponed matches are not included to the round at which they were originally scheduled, but added to the full round they were played immediately afterwards.

Team ╲ Round	1	2	3	4	5	6	7	8	9	10	11	12	13	14	15	16	17	18	19	20	21	22	23	24	25	26	27	28	29	30
Aluminium Arak	13	16	16	14	11	5	2	3	7	10	10	9	9	10	13	13	13	15	15	14										
Chadormalou	5	2	2	5	5	7	11	8	5	2	5	6	4	4	4	5	6	6	6	6										
Esteghlal	3	3	10	8	9	9	6	2	1	1	1	1	1	3	3	3	4	2	4	2		1								
Est. Khuzestan	9	4	3	9	4	1	4	9	9	11	11	12	14	14	11	12	12	13	14	12										
Foolad	16	15	14	13	14	13	12	13	13	12	13	14	13	13	10	11	11	10	11	9										
Gol Gohar	4	9	11	3	3	3	1	6	6	9	6	8	8	7	6	4	3	5	3	5										
Fajr Sepasi	8	5	4	1	1	4	3	10	10	8	9	11	11	9	9	9	9	8	8	8										
Kheybar	1	1	1	4	8	11	7	11	11	7	7	7	6	6	8	8	8	9	9	10										
Malavan	7	6	7	10	10	6	8	4	4	5	8	5	7	8	7	7	7	7	7	7										
Mes Rafsanjan	12	12	15	16	16	16	16	16	16	16	16	16	16	16	16	16	16	16	16	16	16	16	16							
Paykan	2	7	5	6	6	10	13	14	14	15	14	10	10	12	12	10	10	11	10	11										
Persepolis	6	8	6	7	7	8	10	7	8	3	2	3	3	2	2	2	1	4	2	4	5									
Sepahan	11	13	13	15	12	12	9	5	2	4	3	2	2	1	1	1	2	3	5	3										
Shams Azar	10	10	12	12	13	15	15	12	12	14	15	15	15	15	15	14	14	12	12	13										
Tractor	14	14	8	2	2	2	5	1	3	6	4	4	5	5	5	6	5	1	1	1										
Zob Ahan	15	11	9	11	15	14	14	15	15	13	12	13	12	11	14	15	15	14	13	15										

Leader : AFC Champions League Elite
AFC Champions League Elite
AFC Champions League Two
Relegation to 2025–26 Azadegan League

Updated to match(es) played on 3 February 2026. Source: Iran League, Iplstats

== Season statistics ==
As of 27 February 2026

=== Top scorers ===
Rank	Player	Club	Goals
1	(Iran) Amirhossein Hosseinzadeh	Tractor	11
2	(Iran) Ehsan Mahroughi	Foolad	9
3	(Albania) Jasir Asani	Esteghlal	7
3	(Ecuador) Renny Simisterra	Chadormalou	7
3	(Iran) Hooman Rabizadeh	Shams Azar	7
6	(Croatia) Domagoj Drožđek	Tractor	6
6	(Iran) Ali Alipour	Persepolis	6
6	(Iran) Hadi Habibinejad	Chadormalou	6
6	(Iran) Mehdi Sharifi	Mes Rafsanjan / Fajr Sepasi	6
10	(Iran) Mehrdad Ghanbari	Kheybar	5
10	(Iran) Amirhossein Jalalivand	Esteghlal Khuzestan	5
10	(Iran) Mehdi Tikdari	Gol Gohar	5

==== Hat-tricks ====
Player	For	Against	Result	Date
(Croatia) Domagoj Drožđek	Tractor	Aluminium	4–1 (H)	12 September 2025
(Iran) Amirhossein Hosseinzadeh	Tractor	Gol Gohar	5–0 (A)	25 October 2025

=== Top assists ===
Rank	Player	Club	Assists
1	(Iran) Ali Alipour	Persepolis	6
1	(Iran) Reza Mahmoudabadi	Chadormalou	6
3	(Iran) Ramin Rezaeian	Esteghlal / Foolad	4
3	(Iran) Abolfazl Razzaghpour	Foolad	4
3	(Iran) Alireza Koushki	Esteghlal	4
3	(Iran) Mehdi Torabi	Tractor	4
3	(Iran) Mehdi Hashemnejad	Tractor	4
3	(Iran) Amirhossein Hosseinzadeh	Tractor	4
9	(Iran) Milad Mohammadi	Persepolis	3
9	(Iran) Ehsan Hajsafi	Sepahan	3
9	(Iran) Danial Esmaeilifar	Tractor	3
9	(Iran) Farshid Esmaeili	Fajr Sepasi	3
9	(Iran) Hadi Habibinejad	Chadormalou	3
9	(Iran) Amirhossein Jeddi	Zob Ahan	3
9	(Iran) Sina Asadbeigi	Foolad	3
9	(Iran) Mehrdad Ghanbari	Kheybar	3
9	(Iran) Majid Eydi	Gol Gohar	3
9	(Morocco) Munir El Haddadi	Esteghlal	3

=== Clean sheets ===
Rank	Player	Club	Clean sheets
1	(Iran) Alireza Beiranvand	Tractor	11
1	(Iran) Alireza Jafarpour	Shams Azar	11
1	(Iran) Farzad Tayebipour	Malavan	11
4	(Iran) Payam Niazmand	Persepolis	10
4	(Iran) Farzin Garousian	Gol Gohar	10
4	(Brazil) Edson Mardden	Chadormalou	10
7	(Iran) Hossein Hosseini	Sepahan	8
7	(Iran) Mohammad Khalifeh	Aluminium	8
7	(Iran) Hamed Lak	Foolad	8
10	(Iran) Mohammad Javad Kia	Esteghlal Khuzestan	7
