= 2024–25 Persian Gulf Pro League =

24th season of Persian Gulf Pro League

Persian Gulf Pro League
- Season: 2024–25
- Dates: 15 August 2024 – 15 May 2025
- Champions: Tractor (1st title)
- Relegated: Havadar; Nassaji Mazandaran
- AFC Champions League Elite: Tractor; Sepahan
- AFC Champions League Two: Esteghlal
- Matches: 240
- Goals: 474 (1.98 per match)
- Top goalscorer: Amirhossein Hosseinzadeh (14 goals)
- Biggest home win: Sepahan 5–0 Havadar (27 December 2024)
- Biggest away win: Havadar 0–5 Persepolis (1 January 2025)
- Highest scoring: Aluminium Arak 4-2 Foolad (20 October 2024); Tractor 5–1 Mes Rafsanjan (21 January 2025); Esteghlal 5–1 Aluminium Arak (2 May 2025); Malavan 3-3 Zob Ahan (2 May 2025); Tractor 3-3 Nassaji (8 May 2025)
- Longest winning run: Persepolis (7 matches)
- Longest unbeaten run: Sepahan (21 matches)
- Longest winless run: Nassaji Mazandaran (10 matches)
- Longest losing run: Havadar; Chadormalu persepolis (4 matches)
- Highest attendance: 90,000; Tractor – Persepolis (22 August 2024); Tractor – Esteghlal (4 April 2025)
- Lowest attendance: 0 (spectator ban); 6 matches
- Total attendance: 2,043,600
- Average attendance: 8,733 (matches with spectator bans not included)
- All statistics correct as of 27 February 2025.

The 2024–25 Persian Gulf Pro League was the 42nd season of Iran's Football League and 24th as Persian Gulf Pro League since its establishment in 2001. The season started on 15 August 2024 and ended on 15 May 2025. On 2 May 2025, Tractor defeated Shams Azar 4–0 to secure their first title with 2 games to go.

== Teams ==
=== Promotion and relegation (pre-season) ===
A total of sixteen teams contest the league, including fourteen sides from the 2023–24 season and two promoted from the 2023–24 Azadegan League. This includes the two top teams from the Azadegan League. Kheybar Khorramabad and Chadormalou Ardakan (both were promoted to the top flight for the first time). They replaced Paykan Tehran and Sanat Naft Abadan, who were both relegated after eight seasons in the top flight.

| Promoted from 2023–24 Azadegan League | Relegated from 2023–24 Persian Gulf Pro League |
|---|---|
| Kheybar Khorramabad; Chadormalou Ardakan | Paykan Tehran; Sanat Naft Abadan |

=== Stadiums and locations ===
Locations of the 2024–25 Persian Gulf Pro League teams
Location of Tehran teams in 2024–25 Persian Gulf Pro League

| Team | Location | Stadium | Capacity |
|---|---|---|---|
| Aluminium | Arak | Imam Khomeini | 15,000 |
| Chadormalou | Ardakan | Shahid Nassiri | 15,000 |
| Esteghlal | Tehran | Azadi | 78,116 |
| Esteghlal Khuzestan | Ahvaz | Takhti | 10,000 |
| Foolad | Ahvaz | Foolad Arena | 30,655 |
| Gol Gohar | Sirjan | Shahid Qasem Soleimani | 9,000 |
| Havadar | Tehran | Dastgerdi | 8,250 |
| Kheybar | Khorramabad | Takhti Khorramabad | 8,000 |
| Malavan | Bandar-e Anzali | Sirous Ghayeghran | 9,000 |
| Mes Rafsanjan | Rafsanjan | Shohadaye Mes | 10,000 |
| Nassaji | Qaem Shahr | Vatani | 15,000 |
| Persepolis | Tehran | Azadi | 78,116 |
| Sepahan | Isfahan | Naghsh-e-Jahan | 75,000 |
| Shams Azar | Qazvin | Sardar Azadegan | 15,000 |
| Tractor | Tabriz | Yadegar-e Emam | 66,833 |
| Zob Ahan | Fooladshahr | Fooladshahr | 20,000 |

=== Number of teams by Province ===
| Province | Number of teams | Teams |
|---|---|---|
| Tehran | 3 | Esteghlal, Havadar, Persepolis |
| Isfahan | 2 | Sepahan, Zob Ahan |
| Kerman | 2 | Gol Gohar, Mes Rafsanjan |
| Khuzestan | 2 | Foolad, Esteghlal Khuzestan |
| East Azarbaijan | 1 | Tractor |
| Gilan | 1 | Malavan |
| Lorestan | 1 | Kheybar |
| Markazi | 1 | Aluminium |
| Mazandaran | 1 | Nassaji |
| Qazvin | 1 | Shams Azar |
| Yazd | 1 | Chadormalou |

=== Personnel and kits ===
Note: Flags indicate national team as has been defined under FIFA eligibility rules. Players may hold more than one non-FIFA nationality.

| Team | Manager | Captain | Kit manufacturer | Main kit sponsor | Other kit sponsor(s) |
|---|---|---|---|---|---|
| Aluminium | (Iran) Mojtaba Hosseini | (Iran) Amir Nouri | Sinasport | IRALCO | |
| Chadormalou | (Iran) Saeid Akhbari | (Iran) Ali Taheran | Darik | CMIC | |
| Esteghlal | (Iran) Mojtaba Jabbari | (Iran) Hossein Hosseini | Yousef Jameh | PGPIC | |
| Esteghlal Khuzestan | (Iran) Amir Khalifeh-Asl | (Iran) Mohammad Tayyebi | Merooj | INSIG | |
| Foolad | (Iran) Yahya Golmohammadi | (Iran) Ayoub Vali | Yousef Jameh | KSC | |
| Gol Gohar | (Iran) Mehdi Tartar | (Iran) Mehran Golzari | Yousef Jameh | Gol Gohar | |
| Havadar | (Iran) Omid Ravankhah | (Iran) Dariush Shojaeian | Darik | Jack Wrestler | |
| Kheybar | (Iran) Saeid Daghighi | (Iran) Mehdi Kiani | Sinasport | Foulad Amir | |
| Malavan | (Iran) Maziar Zare | (Iran) Hamed Noormohammadi | Start | | |
| Mes Rafsanjan | (Iran) Sirous Pourmousavi | (Iran) Mohsen Azarbad | Start | NICICO | |
| Nassaji | (Iran) Saket Elhami | (Iran) Mehrdad Abdi | Start | Varesh Airlines | |
| Persepolis | (Turkey) İsmail Kartal | (Iran) Omid Alishah | Merooj | Saba Battery | |
| Sepahan | (France) Patrice Carteron | (Iran) Mohammad Karimi | Start | Mobarakeh Steel | |
| Shams Azar | (Iran) Mehdi Rahmati | (Iran) Pouria Sarabadani | Yousef Jameh | Shams Azar Macaron | |
| Tractor | (Croatia) Dragan Skočić | (Iran) Shojae Khalilzadeh | Start | ATA Airlines | |
| Zob Ahan | (Iran) Mohammad Rabiei | (Iran) Mohammad Ghoreishi | Yousef Jameh | | |

1. On the back of shirt.
2. On the sleeves.
3. On the shorts.

=== Managerial changes ===
| Team | Outgoing head coach | Manner of departure | Date of vacancy | Position in table | Incoming head coach | Date of appointment |
|---|---|---|---|---|---|---|
| Esteghlal | (Iran) Javad Nekounam | Resigned | 1 October 2024 | 10th | (Iran) Sohrab Bakhtiarizadeh | 1 October 2024 |
| Esteghlal | (Iran) Sohrab Bakhtiarizadeh | End of caretaker spell | 18 October 2024 | 11th | (South Africa) Pitso Mosimane | 18 October 2024 |
| Sepahan | (Portugal) José Morais | Resigned | 2 November 2024 | 1st | (France) Patrice Carteron | 18 October 2024 |

=== Foreign players ===
The number of foreign players is restricted to six per Persian Gulf Pro League team, including a slot for a player from AFC countries.
In bold: Players that have been capped for their national team.

| Club | Player 1 | Player 2 | Player 3 | Player 4 | Player 5 | AFC player | Former players |
|---|---|---|---|---|---|---|---|
| Aluminium | | | | | | | |
| Chadormalou | (Brazil) Diego Carioca | (Brazil) Edson Mardden | (Brazil) Vitão | (Ecuador) Segundo Portocarrero | | | (Brazil) Guilherme Pira (Brazil) Matheus Santos (Brazil) Wallace (Ba'athist Syria) **Alaa Al Dali** |
| Esteghlal | (Brazil) Raphael Silva | (Gabon) **Didier Ndong** | (Kenya) **Masoud Juma** | (Kyrgyzstan) **Joel Kojo** | | (Uzbekistan) **Jaloliddin Masharipov** | (Argentina) Gustavo Blanco Leschuk (Bosnia and Herzegovina) **Almedin Ziljkić** (Bosnia and Herzegovina) Vedran Kjosevski (Democratic Republic of the Congo) **Gaël Kakuta** (France) Arthur Yamga |
| Esteghlal Khuzestan | (Brazil) Kainã | (Brazil) Sávio Roberto | (Republic of the Congo) **Thievy Bifouma** | (Greece) Dimitrios Chatziisaias | | | (Iraq) **Moamel Abdulridha** |
| Foolad | (Argentina) Gustavo Blanco Leschuk | (Brazil) Chimba | (Mali) Moussa Coulibaly | | | (Uzbekistan) **Utkir Yusupov** | (Austria) Christopher Knett (Nigeria) Godwin Mensha |
| Gol Gohar | (Brazil) Gustavo Vagenin | (Gabon) **Eric Bocoum** | (Senegal) Ousmane Ndong | | | (Tajikistan) **Amadoni Kamolov** | (Senegal) **Bouly Sambou** |
| Havadar | (New Zealand) **Joe Champness** | | | | | (Australia) Matthew Millar | |
| Kheybar | (Kenya) **Teddy Akumu** | | | | | | (Brazil) Tony Batista (Ivory Coast) Kévin Boli |
| Malavan | | | | | | | |
| Mes Rafsanjan | (Albania) **Sebastjan Spahiu** | (Brazil) Jair | (Cameroon) Rooney Eva Wankewai | (Germany) Kofi Schulz | | | |
| Nassaji | (Brazil) Luan Polli | (France) Arthur Yamga | (Iraq) **Muntadher Mohammed** | (Kazakhstan) **Alexander Merkel** | (Sudan) **Mohamed Eisa** | (Uzbekistan) **Jasurbek Yakhshiboev** | |
| Persepolis | (Algeria) **Alexis Guendouz** | (Georgia (country)) **Giorgi Gvelesiani** | (Morocco) **Ayoub El Amloud** | (Turkey) **Serdar Dursun** | | (Uzbekistan) **Oston Urunov** | (Angola) **Lucas João** |
| Sepahan | (Burkina Faso) **Bryan Dabo** | (France) **Steven Nzonzi** | (France) **Wissam Ben Yedder** | (Mauritania) **Aboubakar Kamara** | | (Tajikistan) **Vahdat Hanonov** | |
| Shams Azar | | | | | | | |
| Tractor | (Croatia) Domagoj Drožđek | (Croatia) Igor Postonjski | (Croatia) Tomislav Štrkalj | (Portugal) Ricardo Alves | | | (Albania) **Sokol Cikalleshi** |
| Zob Ahan | (Georgia (country)) **Grigol Chabradze** | | | | | | (Burundi) **Bonfils-Caleb Bimenyimana** |

== League table ==
| Pos | Team | Pld | W | D | L | GF | GA | GD | Pts | Qualification or relegation |
|---|---|---|---|---|---|---|---|---|---|---|
| 1 | Tractor (C) | 30 | 21 | 5 | 4 | 57 | 19 | +38 | 68 | Qualification for the 2025–26 AFC Champions League Elite phase |
| 2 | Sepahan | 30 | 16 | 12 | 2 | 48 | 21 | +27 | 60 (Note: Sepahan finished ahead of Persepolis on head-to-head points: Sepahan 6, Persepolis 0) | Qualification for the 2025–26 AFC Champions League Elite qualifying play-offs |
| 3 | Persepolis | 30 | 18 | 6 | 6 | 42 | 20 | +22 | 60 | |
| 4 | Foolad | 30 | 15 | 8 | 7 | 36 | 30 | +6 | 53 | |
| 5 | Gol Gohar | 30 | 12 | 11 | 7 | 23 | 16 | +7 | 47 | |
| 6 | Zob Ahan | 30 | 10 | 12 | 8 | 32 | 28 | +4 | 42 | |
| 7 | Malavan | 30 | 10 | 9 | 11 | 33 | 33 | 0 | 39 | |
| 8 | Aluminium Arak | 30 | 7 | 14 | 9 | 30 | 31 | −1 | 35 | |
| 9 | Esteghlal (Note: Esteghlal qualified to the AFC Champions League Two as 2024–25 Hazfi Cup champions.) | 30 | 7 | 13 | 10 | 30 | 33 | −3 | 34 (Note: Esteghlal finished ahead of Chadormalou on Total goal difference. Head-to-head points: Esteghlal 2, Chadormalou 2. Total goal difference: Esteghlal −3, Chadormalou −6.) | Qualification for the 2025–26 AFC Champions League Two group stage |
| 10 | Chadormalou | 30 | 8 | 10 | 12 | 22 | 28 | −6 | 34 | |
| 11 | Kheybar | 30 | 8 | 9 | 13 | 24 | 31 | −7 | 33 | |
| 12 | Esteghlal Khuzestan | 30 | 6 | 13 | 11 | 19 | 30 | −11 | 31 | |
| 13 | Shams Azar | 30 | 7 | 8 | 15 | 23 | 41 | −18 | 29 | |
| 14 | Mes Rafsanjan | 30 | 6 | 10 | 14 | 24 | 38 | −14 | 28 | |
| 15 | Nassaji (R) | 30 | 3 | 14 | 13 | 15 | 28 | −13 | 23 | Relegation to 2025–26 Azadegan League |
| 16 | Havadar (R) | 30 | 4 | 10 | 16 | 17 | 48 | −31 | 22 | Relegation to 2025–26 Azadegan League |

Source: Iran Football League Organization - League Full Table, Iplstats
Rules for classification: 1) Points; 2) Head-to-head points; 3) Head-to-head goal difference; 4) Total goal difference; 5) Total goals scored; 6) Fair-play points.
(Note: Head-to-head record is used only after all the matches between the teams in question have been played).
(C) Champions; (R) Relegated

== Results ==
| Home \ Away | ALU | CHA | EST | ESK | FOL | GOL | HAV | KHE | MLV | MES | NSJ | PRS | SEP | SAQ | TRC | ZOB |
|---|---|---|---|---|---|---|---|---|---|---|---|---|---|---|---|---|
| Aluminium Arak | — | 0–0 | 1–1 | 1–1 | 4–2 | 0–0 | 0–0 | 1–0 | 1–1 | 0–0 | 1–1 | 1–1 | 1–1 | 3–0 | 0–1 | 2–0 |
| Chadormalou | 1–1 | — | 0–0 | 3–0 | 1–1 | 0–1 | 1–2 | 1–0 | 1–0 | 1–0 | 1–0 | 0–1 | 1–2 | 1–1 | 2–2 | 1–0 |
| Esteghlal | 5–1 | 0–0 | — | 2–0 | 0–1 | 0–0 | 2–2 | 1–1 | 2–2 | 1–0 | 1–0 | 0–1 | 1–1 | 0–1 | 0–2 | 0–3 |
| Esteghlal Khuzestan | 0–0 | 1–1 | 1–0 | — | 0–0 | 1–1 | 1–1 | 0–0 | 1–2 | 3–2 | 2–0 | 1–0 | 0–1 | 1–0 | 1–3 | 0–0 |
| Foolad | 2–0 | 2–1 | 0–2 | 2–1 | — | 1–1 | 3–0 | 1–1 | 2–1 | 0–0 | 1–0 | 1–1 | 2–2 | 1–0 | 1–2 | 1–0 |
| Gol Gohar | 0–0 | 2–0 | 1–1 | 2–0 | 0–1 | — | 0–0 | 2–0 | 1–0 | 0–0 | 2–1 | 0–1 | 1–1 | 1–0 | 0–2 | 0–2 |
| Havadar | 2–1 | 0–1 | 1–2 | 0–1 | 0–1 | 0–1 | — | 0–1 | 2–0 | 0–4 | 0–1 | 0–5 | 1–1 | 2–3 | 0–4 | 0–0 |
| Kheybar | 1–0 | 2–0 | 3–1 | 1–0 | 2–0 | 0–0 | 2–0 | — | 1–3 | 1–2 | 1–0 | 1–2 | 1–2 | 0–0 | 1–2 | 1–1 |
| Malavan | 1–1 | 3–1 | 0–0 | 1–0 | 1–1 | 1–0 | 0–2 | 3–0 | — | 3–0 | 1–0 | 1–2 | 1–1 | 2–0 | 0–2 | 3–3 |
| Mes Rafsanjan | 3–1 | 1–0 | 0–0 | 0–0 | 2–3 | 0–0 | 1–1 | 0–0 | 1–1 | — | 0–0 | 0–3 | 0–3 | 0–1 | 0–2 | 1–2 |
| Nassaji | 1–2 | 0–0 | 2–2 | 0–0 | 0–1 | 0–1 | 0–0 | 0–0 | 1–1 | 0–1 | — | 0–1 | 1–1 | 1–0 | 1–1 | 0–3 |
| Persepolis | 2–0 | 1–0 | 2–1 | 0–0 | 2–0 | 1–0 | 2–0 | 2–1 | 2–0 | 1–3 | 0–1 | — | 0–2 | 2–0 | 2–0 | 1–1 |
| Sepahan | 1–0 | 3–1 | 3–1 | 1–1 | 2–0 | 1–2 | 5–0 | 2–0 | 1–0 | 1–0 | 1–1 | 2–1 | — | 1–0 | 0–1 | 4–1 |
| Shams Azar | 1–3 | 1–1 | 1–2 | 2–2 | 0–3 | 0–1 | 1–1 | 2–0 | 0–1 | 3–1 | 0–0 | 3–2 | 1–1 | — | 0–4 | 1–1 |
| Tractor | 2–0 | 1–0 | 2–1 | 3–0 | 1–2 | 2–1 | 4–0 | 1–0 | 3–0 | 5–1 | 3–3 | 1–1 | 0–0 | 0–1 | — | 0–1 |
| Zob Ahan | 0–4 | 0–1 | 1–1 | 1–0 | 3–0 | 0–2 | 0–0 | 2–2 | 1–0 | 2–1 | 0–0 | 0–0 | 1–1 | 3–0 | 0–1 | — |

Source: Iran League, Iplstats
Legend: Blue = home team win; Yellow = draw; Red = away team win.
For upcoming matches, an "a" indicates there is an article about the rivalry between the two participants.

== Positions by round ==
The table lists the positions of teams after each week of matches. In order to preserve chronological evolvements, any postponed matches are not included to the round at which they were originally scheduled, but added to the full round they were played immediately afterwards.

| Team ╲ Round | 1 | 2 | 3 | 4 | 5 | 6 | 7 | 8 | 9 | 10 | 11 | 12 | 13 | 14 | 15 | 16 | 17 | 18 | 19 | 20 | 21 | 22 | 23 | 24 | 25 | 26 | 27 | 28 | 29 | 30 |
|---|---|---|---|---|---|---|---|---|---|---|---|---|---|---|---|---|---|---|---|---|---|---|---|---|---|---|---|---|---|---|
| Aluminium Arak | 9 | 8 | 11 | 12 | 13 | 11 | 7 | 7 | 8 | 9 | 9 | 9 | 10 | 11 | 7 | 7 | 6 | 6 | 6 | 8 | 10 | 7 | 7 | 8 | 9 | 9 | 9 | 11 | 10 | 8 |
| Chadormalou | 16 | 12 | 15 | 13 | 12 | 8 | 9 | 8 | 6 | 6 | 6 | 6 | 6 | 7 | 9 | 10 | 10 | 8 | 8 | 6 | 8 | 8 | 10 | 12 | 8 | 8 | 8 | 9 | 9 | 10 |
| Esteghlal | 3 | 3 | 9 | 7 | 9 | 7 | 8 | 11 | 13 | 10 | 8 | 8 | 9 | 10 | 11 | 11 | 11 | 9 | 9 | 7 | 9 | 10 | 9 | 9 | 13 | 13 | 11 | 8 | 8 | 9 |
| Est. Khuzestan | 10 | 6 | 7 | 10 | 8 | 10 | 12 | 10 | 10 | 8 | 7 | 7 | 8 | 9 | 10 | 9 | 9 | 11 | 10 | 11 | 12 | 11 | 12 | 10 | 10 | 10 | 12 | 12 | 12 | 12 |
| Foolad | 4 | 4 | 8 | 11 | 6 | 5 | 4 | 5 | 5 | 5 | 5 | 4 | 3 | 4 | 4 | 3 | 3 | 3 | 4 | 4 | 4 | 4 | 4 | 4 | 4 | 4 | 4 | 4 | 4 | 4 |
| Gol Gohar | 12 | 7 | 4 | 5 | 5 | 6 | 6 | 6 | 7 | 7 | 10 | 10 | 11 | 8 | 5 | 5 | 5 | 5 | 5 | 5 | 5 | 5 | 5 | 5 | 5 | 5 | 5 | 5 | 5 | 5 |
| Havadar | 13 | 13 | 14 | 15 | 16 | 16 | 16 | 16 | 16 | 15 | 16 | 16 | 16 | 16 | 16 | 16 | 16 | 16 | 16 | 16 | 16 | 16 | 16 | 16 | 16 | 16 | 16 | 16 | 16 | 16 |
| Kheibar | 5 | 10 | 6 | 9 | 11 | 13 | 13 | 14 | 12 | 13 | 14 | 13 | 14 | 15 | 15 | 14 | 14 | 14 | 12 | 12 | 11 | 12 | 11 | 11 | 12 | 12 | 10 | 10 | 11 | 11 |
| Malavan | 6 | 5 | 3 | 4 | 4 | 3 | 3 | 4 | 4 | 4 | 4 | 5 | 5 | 6 | 8 | 8 | 8 | 10 | 11 | 9 | 6 | 6 | 6 | 6 | 6 | 6 | 6 | 6 | 7 | 7 |
| Mes Rafsanjan | 15 | 14 | 10 | 8 | 10 | 12 | 14 | 13 | 11 | 14 | 15 | 14 | 13 | 14 | 12 | 13 | 13 | 13 | 14 | 13 | 13 | 13 | 14 | 14 | 14 | 14 | 14 | 14 | 14 | 14 |
| Nassaji | 14 | 16 | 16 | 16 | 14 | 14 | 15 | 15 | 15 | 16 | 13 | 12 | 12 | 12 | 13 | 15 | 15 | 15 | 15 | 15 | 14 | 15 | 15 | 15 | 15 | 15 | 15 | 15 | 15 | 15 |
| Persepolis | 7 | 9 | 5 | 2 | 2 | 1 | 1 | 1 | 1 | 1 | 3 | 3 | 4 | 3 | 3 | 4 | 4 | 4 | 3 | 3 | 3 | 3 | 2 | 3 | 3 | 3 | 3 | 3 | 3 | 3 |
| Sepahan | 1 | 1 | 1 | 1 | 1 | 4 | 2 | 2 | 2 | 3 | 2 | 2 | 2 | 1 | 2 | 2 | 1 | 1 | 2 | 2 | 2 | 2 | 3 | 2 | 2 | 2 | 2 | 2 | 2 | 2 |
| Shams Azar | 11 | 15 | 13 | 14 | 15 | 15 | 11 | 12 | 14 | 11 | 12 | 15 | 15 | 13 | 14 | 12 | 12 | 12 | 13 | 14 | 15 | 14 | 13 | 13 | 11 | 11 | 13 | 13 | 13 | 13 |
| Tractor | 2 | 2 | 2 | 3 | 3 | 2 | 5 | 3 | 3 | 2 | 1 | 1 | 1 | 2 | 1 | 1 | 2 | 2 | 1 | 1 | 1 | 1 | 1 | 1 | 1 | 1 | 1 | 1 | 1 | 1 |
| Zob Ahan | 8 | 11 | 12 | 6 | 7 | 9 | 10 | 9 | 9 | 12 | 11 | 11 | 7 | 5 | 6 | 6 | 7 | 7 | 7 | 10 | 7 | 9 | 8 | 7 | 7 | 7 | 7 | 7 | 6 | 6 |

| Leader : 2025–26 AFC Champions League Elite Group stage |
| AFC Champions League Elite Play-off stage |
| Relegation to 2025–26 Azadegan League |

Source: Iran League, Iplstats

== Season statistics ==
=== Top scorers ===
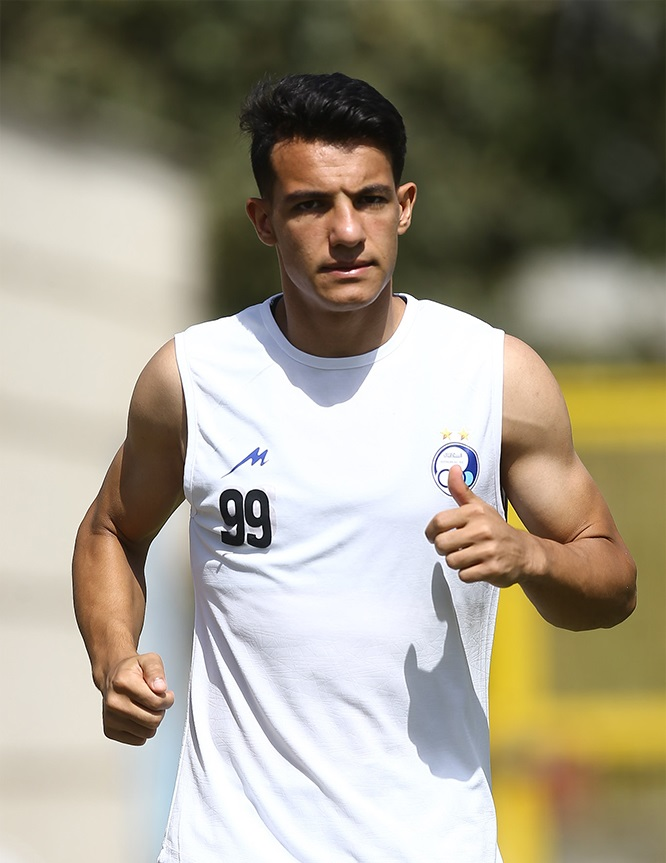
Amirhossein Hosseinzadeh won the Golden Boot with 14 goals.

| Rank | Player | Club | Goals |
|---|---|---|---|
| 1 | (Iran) Amirhossein Hosseinzadeh | Tractor | 14 |
| 2 | (Iran) Ali Alipour | Persepolis | 12 |
| 3 | (Iran) Ramin Rezaeian | Esteghlal | 10 |
| 4 | (Iran) Mehdi Limouchi | Sepahan | 9 |
| 4 | (Iran) Mohammad Amin Kazemian | Aluminium | 9 |
| 6 | (Croatia) Domagoj Drožđek | Tractor | 8 |
| 6 | (Iran) Reza Ghandipour | Malavan | 8 |
| 6 | (Iran) Mehdi Hashemnejad | Tractor | 8 |
| 6 | (Croatia) Tomislav Štrkalj | Tractor | 8 |
| 10 | (Iran) Majid Aliyari | Zob Ahan | 7 |
| 10 | (Iran) Mohammad Mehdi Mohebi | Sepahan | 7 |
| 10 | (Iran) Mohammad Reza Soleimani | Foolad | 7 |

==== Hat-tricks ====
| Player | For | Against | Result | Date |
|---|---|---|---|---|
| (Iran) Mehdi Limouchi | Sepahan | Havadar | 5–0 (H) | 27 December 2024 |
| (Iran) Ali Alipour | Persepolis | Havadar | 5–0 (A) | 1 January 2025 |

=== Clean sheets ===
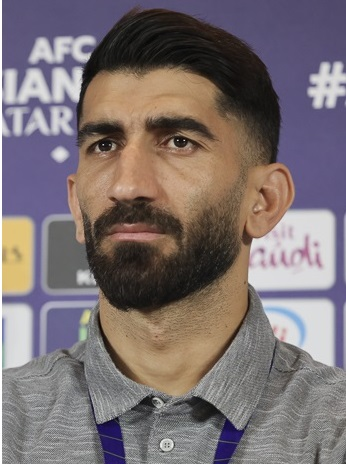
Alireza Beiranvand kept 16 clean sheets and won his fifth Persian Gulf Pro League Golden Glove.

| Rank | Player | Club | Clean sheets |
|---|---|---|---|
| 1 | (Iran) Alireza Beiranvand | Tractor | 16 |
| 2 | (Iran) Mohammad Reza Akhbari | Gol Gohar | 14 |
| 2 | (Algeria) Alexis Guendouz | Persepolis | 14 |
| 4 | (Iran) Parsa Jafari | Zob Ahan | 12 |
| 4 | (Uzbekistan) Utkir Yusupov | Foolad | 12 |
| 6 | (Iran) Ahmad Gohari | Esteghlal Khuzestan | 11 |
| 6 | (Brazil) Edson Mardden | Chadormalou | 11 |
| 8 | (Iran) Mohammad Khalifeh | Aluminium | 10 |
| 8 | (Iran) Hamed Lak | Mes Rafsanjan | 10 |
| 8 | (Brazil) Luan Polli | Nassaji | 10 |

== Attendances ==
=== Average home attendances ===
| Pos | Team | Total | High | Low | Average | Change |
|---|---|---|---|---|---|---|
| 1 | Tractor | 617,000 | 90,000 | 0 | 44,071 | +38.1% |
| 2 | Persepolis | 251,500 | 50,000 | 3,000 | 16,767 | −49.9% |
| 3 | Sepahan | 216,000 | 45,000 | 4,000 | 14,400 | −20.3% |
| 4 | Foolad | 150,200 | 40,000 | 1,000 | 10,013 | +39.7% |
| 5 | Nassaji | 136,500 | 15,000 | 2,000 | 9,100 | +10.5% |
| 6 | Chadormalou | 116,200 | 13,000 | 0 | 8,300 | n/a |
| 7 | Malavan | 104,000 | 10,000 | 2,000 | 6,933 | −1.9% |
| 8 | Esteghlal | 101,000 | 12,000 | 2,000 | 6,733 | −80.3% |
| 9 | Kheybar | 79,000 | 9,000 | 0 | 5,643 | n/a |
| 10 | Shams Azar | 60,500 | 12,000 | 500 | 4,033 | −30.3% |
| 11 | Esteghlal Khuzestan | 58,050 | 20,000 | 250 | 3,870 | −4.7% |
| 12 | Gol Gohar | 38,800 | 9,000 | 300 | 2,587 | −36.9% |
| 13 | Aluminium Arak | 35,900 | 8,000 | 300 | 2,393 | −36.2% |
| 14 | Mes Rafsanjan | 31,600 | 10,000 | 300 | 2,107 | −4.5% |
| 15 | Zob Ahan | 27,750 | 9,000 | 0 | 1,982 | −25.1% |
| 16 | Havadar | 19,600 | 8,000 | 0 | 1,400 | +600.0% |
| | League total | 2,043,600 | 90,000 | 0 | 8,733 | −19.3% |

Updated to games played on 15 May 2025
Source: Iranleague.ir
Notes:
Matches with spectator bans are not included in average attendances
Chadormalou and Kheybar played in the previous season in the Azadegan League

=== Attendances by round ===
| Team/Round | 1 | 2 | 3 | 4 | 5 | 6 | 7 | 8 | 9 | 10 | 11 | 12 | 13 | 14 | 15 | 16 | 17 | 18 | 19 | 20 | 21 | 22 | 23 | 24 | 25 | 26 | 27 | 28 | 29 | 30 | Average |
|---|---|---|---|---|---|---|---|---|---|---|---|---|---|---|---|---|---|---|---|---|---|---|---|---|---|---|---|---|---|---|---|
| Aluminium Arak | A | 1,000 | A | 1,000 | A | 5,000 | A | 2,000 | A | A | 400 | A | 8,000 | A | 1,000 | 700 | A | 500 | A | 6,000 | A | 2,000 | A | 6,000 | 1,500 | A | 500 | A | 300 | A | 2,393 |
| Chadormalou | A | NC | A | 8,000 | A | 10,000 | A | 7,000 | A | 10,000 | A | 6,000 | A | 13,000 | A | 12,000 | A | 8,200 | A | 5,000 | A | 12,000 | A | 5,000 | A | 12,000 | A | 3,000 | A | 5,000 | 8,300 |
| Esteghlal | A | 12,000 | A | 5,000 | A | 10,000 | A | 5,000 | A | 10,000 | A | 2,000 | A | A | 8,000 | 8,000 | A | 5,000 | A | 5,000 | A | 6,000 | A | 8,000 | A | 7,000 | A | 5,000 | 5,000 | A | 6,733 |
| Esteghlal Khuzestan | 500 | A | 20,000 | A | 1,000 | A | 2,000 | 1,000 | A | 20,000 | A | 1,000 | A | 7,000 | A | A | 1,000 | A | 500 | A | 300 | A | A | 1,000 | A | 500 | A | 250 | A | 2,000 | 3,870 |
| Foolad | A | 2,000 | A | 5,000 | A | 7,200 | A | A | 10,000 | A | 25,000 | A | 5,000 | A | 7,000 | 6,000 | A | 40,000 | A | 6,000 | A | 25,000 | 2,000 | A | 4,000 | A | 5,000 | A | 1,000 | A | 10,013 |
| Gol Gohar | A | 2,000 | A | 9,000 | A | 3,000 | A | 3,000 | A | 2,000 | A | A | 2,000 | A | NC | 3,000 | A | 2,000 | A | 2,000 | A | 500 | A | 300 | A | 500 | 9,000 | A | 500 | A | 2,587 |
| Havadar | 1,500 | A | 8,000 | A | 100 | A | 5,000 | A | 200 | A | 500 | A | NC | A | 2,000 | A | 200 | A | 300 | A | 200 | A | 300 | A | 300 | A | 200 | A | 800 | A | 1,400 |
| Kheybar | A | 8,000 | 7,000 | A | NC | A | 4,000 | A | 8,000 | A | 2,000 | A | 6,000 | A | 6,000 | 3,000 | A | A | 8,000 | A | 5,000 | A | 5,000 | A | 2,000 | A | 6,000 | A | 9,000 | A | 5,643 |
| Malavan | 5,000 | A | 9,000 | A | 7,000 | 10,000 | A | 10,000 | A | 10,000 | A | 8,000 | A | 7,000 | A | A | 8,000 | A | 2,000 | A | A | 8,000 | A | 7,000 | A | 3,000 | A | 6,000 | A | 4,000 | 6,933 |
| Mes Rafsanjan | 2,000 | A | 1,000 | A | 3,000 | A | 2,000 | A | 2,000 | A | 1,000 | 500 | A | 1,000 | A | A | 1,000 | A | 5,000 | A | 500 | A | 300 | A | 2,000 | A | A | 10,000 | A | 300 | 2,107 |
| Nassaji | 7,000 | A | 10,000 | A | 10,000 | A | 8,000 | A | 6,000 | 10,000 | A | 7,000 | A | 15,000 | A | A | 10,000 | A | 5,000 | A | 12,000 | A | 15,000 | A | A | 15,000 | A | 2,000 | A | 4,500 | 9,100 |
| Persepolis | 8,000 | A | 15,000 | A | 9,000 | A | 9,000 | A | 6,000 | A | 6,000 | A | 3,000 | 8,500 | A | A | 50,000 | A | 7,000 | A | 50,000 | A | 30,000 | A | 10,000 | A | 20,000 | A | A | 20,000 | 16,767 |
| Sepahan | 9,000 | A | 4,000 | 10,000 | A | 4,000 | A | 4,000 | A | 5,000 | A | 45,000 | A | 13,000 | A | A | 10,000 | A | A | 31,000 | A | 16,000 | A | 15,000 | A | 10,000 | A | 15,000 | A | 25,000 | 14,400 |
| Shams Azar | 10,000 | A | A | 3,000 | A | 2,000 | A | 1,500 | A | 2,000 | A | 1,500 | A | 2,500 | A | A | 1,000 | 7,000 | A | 3,000 | A | 1,000 | A | 12,000 | A | 1,500 | A | 12,000 | A | 500 | 4,033 |
| Tractor | A | 90,000 | A | 40,000 | A | A | 25,000 | A | 10,000 | A | 5,000 | A | 7,000 | A | 30,000 | 10,000 | A | 50,000 | A | NC | 70,000 | A | 40,000 | A | 90,000 | A | 80,000 | A | 70,000 | A | 44,071 |
| Zob Ahan | A | NC | A | A | 6,000 | A | 1,000 | A | 200 | A | 300 | A | 500 | A | 200 | 9,000 | A | 500 | 2,000 | A | 1,000 | A | 6,000 | A | 500 | A | 300 | A | 250 | A | 1,982 |
| Total | 43,000 | 115,000 | 74,000 | 81,000 | 36,100 | 51,200 | 56,000 | 33,500 | 42,400 | 69,000 | 40,200 | 71,000 | 31,500 | 67,000 | 54,200 | 51,700 | 81,200 | 113,200 | 29,800 | 58,000 | 139,000 | 70,500 | 98,600 | 54,300 | 110,300 | 49,500 | 121,000 | 53,250 | 86,850 | 61,300 | 2,043,600 |
| Average | 5,375 | 19,167 | 9,250 | 10,125 | 5,157 | 6,400 | 7,000 | 4,188 | 5,300 | 8,625 | 5,025 | 8,875 | 4,500 | 8,375 | 7,743 | 6,463 | 10,150 | 14,150 | 3,725 | 8,286 | 17,375 | 8,813 | 12,325 | 6,788 | 13,788 | 6,188 | 15,125 | 6,656 | 10,856 | 7,663 | 8,733 |

Notes:
Updated to games played on 15 May 2025. Source: Iranleague.ir
Matches with spectator bans are not included in average attendances

=== Highest attendances ===
| Rank | Home team | Score | Away team | Attendance | Date | Week | Stadium |
|---|---|---|---|---|---|---|---|
| 1 | Tractor | 1–1 | Persepolis | 90,000 | 22 August 2024 | 2 | Sahand |
| 1 | Tractor | 2–1 | Esteghlal | 90,000 | 4 April 2025 | 25 | Sahand |
| 3 | Tractor | 3–0 | Malavan | 80,000 | 18 April 2025 | 27 | Sahand |
| 4 | Tractor | 0–0 | Sepahan | 70,000 | 27 February 2025 | 21 | Sahand |
| 4 | Tractor | 3–3 | Nassaji | 70,000 | 8 May 2025 | 29 | Sahand |
| 6 | Persepolis | 2–0 | Tractor | 50,000 | 26 January 2025 | 17 | Azadi |
| 6 | Tractor | 4–0 | Havadar | 50,000 | 1 February 2025 | 18 | Sahand |
| 6 | Persepolis | 2–1 | Esteghlal | 50,000 | 27 February 2025 | 21 | Azadi |
| 9 | Sepahan | 2–1 | Persepolis | 45,000 | 16 December 2024 | 12 | Naghsh-e Jahan |
| 10 | Tractor | 0–1 | Zob Ahan | 40,000 | 13 September 2024 | 4 | Sahand |

Notes:
Updated to games played on 15 May 2025. Source: Iranleague.ir

=== Additional information ===
Due to renovations at Azadi Stadium, Tehran's rivals Esteghlal and Persepolis had to play their home matches at other stadiums for several months. This led to a significant decline in their attendance.

On 16 December 2024, the Iranian El Clásico between Sepahan and Persepolis was played at the Naghsh-e Jahan Stadium without the presence of male fans. Instead, only female fans were allowed to attend the match. A total of 45,000 women attended the match and saw Sepahan win 2–1 at home. FIFA President Gianni Infantino then expressed his gratitude for the high number of female spectators at a top match in the Iranian professional league. The return match on 18 April 2025 was also played exclusively in front of female spectators.

The match on matchday 17 between Nassaji and Aluminium Arak also took place in front of an exclusively female audience of 10,000. 10,000 exclusively female spectators also attended the match between Persepolis and Esteghlal Khuzestan on matchday 25. For the match between Chadormalou and Foolad on matchday 28, only women were allowed to purchase tickets, with the host offering discounted tickets. Also, on the same match day, Nassaji played only in front of a female audience again.

The match between Tractor and Esteghlal on matchday 25 was officially attended by 90,000 spectators in the overcrowded Yadegar-e Emam (Sahand) Stadium. Several thousand more fans gathered around the stadium to watch the game. Including the 90,000 spectators inside the stadium, a total of approximately 100,000 to 120,000 people were on or near the stadium area. The large number of people around the game also attracted international attention. Previously, 90,000 fans were present at the match against Persepolis on the second matchday. On matchday 27, the stadium was once again overcrowded. 80,000 fans watched the match between Tractor and Malavan.

Foolad also experienced significant overcrowding in one match. On Matchday 18, around 40,000 fans attended the home game against Persepolis in the 30,655-seat Shohadaye Foolad Khuzestan stadium.

== See also ==
- 2024–25 Azadegan League
- 2024–25 League 2
- 2024–25 3rd Division
- 2024–25 Hazfi Cup
- 2024 Iranian Super Cup
