= Chadormalu =

Iron ore mine in Yazd province, Iran

- Location in Iran
- Location: Chadormalu, Yazd province, Iran; 32°19′03″N 55°31′40″E
- Products: Iron Ore
- Company: Chadormalu Mining and Industrial Company
- Website: https://web.archive.org/web/20120120071148/http://www.chadormalu.com/

Chadormalu (Persian: چادرملو) is an iron ore mine in the Yazd province of central Iran with an adjacent settlement and administration complex belonging to Chadormalu Mining and Industrial Company.

The mine is situated in an otherwise uninhabited stretch of the Dasht-e Kavir desert about 180 km northeast of Yazd and 300 km south of Tabas about 40 km off the Yazd–Tabas road.

The ore deposits at Chadormalu were discovered in 1940 and construction of the mine complex began in 1994. Production was started in 1999. In the same year the site was connected to the Iranian rail network by connection to Meybod.
