= Ousmane Ndong =

Senegalese footballer (born 1999)

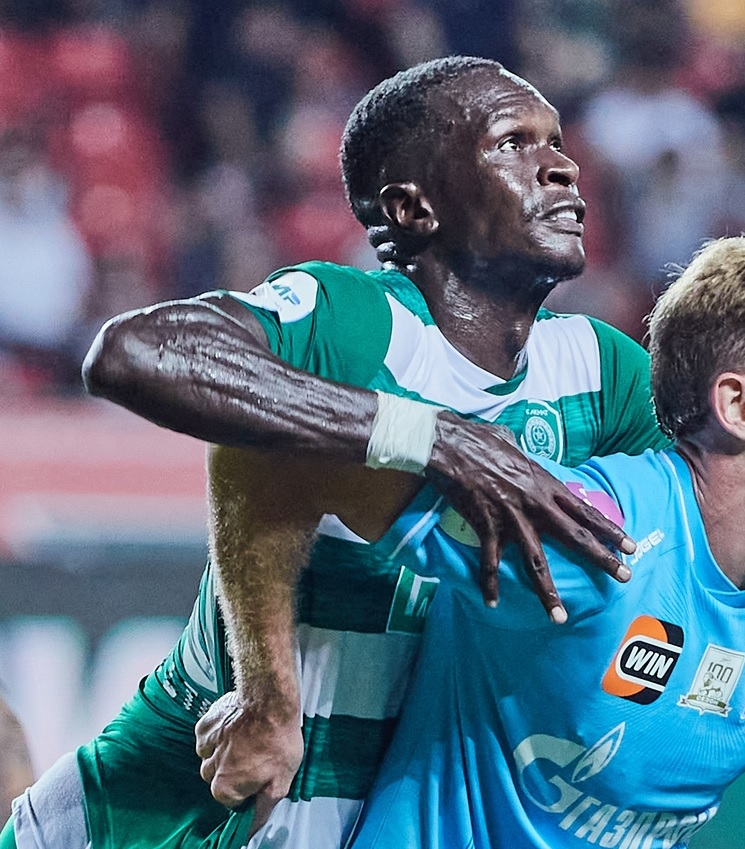
- Ndong with Akhmat in 2025

Personal information
- Date of birth: 20 September 1999 (age 27)
- Place of birth: Dakar, Senegal
- Height: 1.92 m (6 ft 4 in)
- Position: Centre-back

Team information
- Current team: Akhmat Grozny
- Number: 90

Youth career
- Angelo Africa
- Teungueth FC
- Cayor Foot FC
- 2018–2020: Lanús

Senior career*
| Years | Team | Apps | (Gls) |
| 2020–2021 | Lanús | 2 | (0) |
| 2022–2023 | Albion | 26 | (1) |
| 2023–2024 | Gualaceo | 20 | (1) |
| 2024 | Esteghlal Khuzestan | 14 | (3) |
| 2024–2025 | Gol Gohar | 27 | (1) |
| 2025– | Akhmat Grozny | 29 | (2) |
- * Club domestic league appearances and goals as of 29 August 2026

Ousmane Ndong (born 20 September 1999) is a Senegalese professional footballer who plays as a centre-back for Russian club Akhmat Grozny. Besides Senegal, he has played in Uruguay, Argentina, Ecuador, Iran and Russia.

== Career ==
Ndong started out as a central midfielder, spending his early youth years in Senegal with Angelo Africa, Teungueth FC and Cayor Foot FC. In 2018, Ndong moved to Argentina to join Primera División team Lanús. He played in their academy for two years, latterly as captain, whilst transforming into a centre-back. He made the breakthrough into Luis Zubeldía's first-team in mid-2020. He scored in a friendly against Arsenal de Sarandí on 29 September, before making his senior debut in the Copa de la Liga Profesional against Newell's Old Boys on 14 November; becoming the first Senegalese player to play in the Argentine top-flight. On 3 January 2022 it was confirmed, that Ndong's contract with Lanús had been terminated.

At the end of February 2022, Ndong moved to Uruguayan Primera División side Albion.

On 21 July 2025, Ndong signed a three-year contract with Russian Premier League club Akhmat Grozny.

== Personal life ==
Born in Dakar, Ndong was born with two brothers and one sister. His father is a retired policeman, while his mother (d. 2019) was a doctor. He was childhood friends with Sadio Mané. In 2019, in Argentina, Ndong was robbed at gunpoint. He also suffered racist abuse while in the South American country. It took him nine months to learn Spanish, having only previously spoken French and partial English. Ndong states his love of Argentina came from watching Lionel Messi and the Argentina national team; revealing he cried when the nation was eliminated from the Copa América Centenario.

== Career statistics ==
As of 29 August 2026

| Club | Season | League | | | Cup | | Other | | Total | |
| Club | Season | Division | Apps | Goals | Apps | Goals | Apps | Goals | Apps | Goals |
|---|---|---|---|---|---|---|---|---|---|---|
| Lanús | 2020 | Argentine Primera División | – | | | | 2 (Note: Appearances in Copa de la Liga, Soccerway counts them as league appearances) | 0 | 2 | 0 |
| Albion | 2022 | Uruguayan Primera División | 26 | 1 | 1 | 0 | – | | 27 | 1 |
| Gualaceo | 2023 | Ecuadorian Serie A | 20 | 1 | – | | – | | 20 | 1 |
| Esteghlal Khuzestan | 2023–24 | Persian Gulf Pro League | 14 | 3 | 1 | 0 | – | | 15 | 3 |
| Gol Gohar | 2024–25 | Persian Gulf Pro League | 27 | 1 | 3 | 2 | – | | 30 | 3 |
| Akhmat Grozny | 2025–26 | Russian Premier League | 23 | 2 | 3 | 1 | – | | 26 | 3 |
| Akhmat Grozny | 2026–27 | Russian Premier League | 6 | 0 | 2 | 0 | – | | 8 | 0 |
| Akhmat Grozny | Total | | 29 | 2 | 5 | 1 | 0 | 0 | 34 | 3 |
| Career total | | | 116 | 8 | 10 | 3 | 2 | 0 | 128 | 11 |
