= Hadi Habibinejad =

Iranian football midfielder (born 1995)

Personal information
- Full name: Hadi Habibinejad
- Date of birth: October 17, 1995 (age 31)
- Place of birth: Ramhormoz, Iran
- Position: Midfielder

Team information
- Current team: Tractor
- Number: 10

Youth career
- 2011–2013: Pirouzi Ramhormoz
- 2013–2014: Foolad

Senior career*
Years	Team	Apps	(Gls)
2014–2018	Foolad	45	(1)
2018–2021	Malavan	6	(3)
2021–2021	Fajr Sepasi	1	(0)
2021–2022	Tractor	2	(0)
2022	Shahrdari Astara	3	(1)
2022–2023	Esteghlal Mollasani	13	(4)
2023–2026	Chadormalou	46	(12)
2026–	Tractor	7	(0)

International career^{‡}
2013–2015	Iran U20	1	(0)
2026–	Iran	1	(0)
- * Club domestic league appearances and goals as of 7 November 2025 ‡ National team caps and goals as of 4 June 2026

Hadi Habibinejad (Persian: هادی حبیبی‌نژاد) is an Iranian football midfielder who currently plays for Iranian football club Tractor in the Persian Gulf Pro League.

== Club career ==
=== Foolad ===
He started his career with Foolad at youth level. Subsequently, he was signed to the first team by Dragan Skočić under a three-year contract keeping him at Foolad until 2017. He made his debut for Foolad in the second fixture of the 2014–15 Iran Pro League season against Persepolis, as a substitute for Sasan Ansari.

== National Team career ==
He made his debut against Mali on 4 June 2026 in a Friendly Match.

=== International ===
As of match played 4 June 2026

Appearances and goals by national team and year
National team	Year	Apps	Goals
Iran	2026	1	0
Total		1	0
