= Alireza Arta =

Iranian footballer (born 1997)

Personal information
- Date of birth: 4 February 1997 (age 29)
- Place of birth: Kerman, Iran
- Height: 1.82 m (6 ft 0 in)
- Position: Defender

Team information
- Current team: Chadormalou
- Number: 3

Youth career
- 2012–2016: Mes Kerman

Senior career*
Years	Team	Apps	(Gls)
2016–2020	Mes Kerman	19	(0)
2020–2024	Gol Gohar	65	(1)
2024–2025	Tractor	0	(0)
2025–	Chadormalou	18	(0)

International career^{‡}
2017–2019	Iran U23	12	(2)
- * Club domestic league appearances and goals as of 18 April 2025 ‡ National team caps and goals as of 8 January 2018

Alireza Arta (Persian: علیرضا آرتاا; born 4 February 1997) is an Iranian professional football player who plays as defender for the Persian Gulf Pro League club Chadormalou.

== Career statistics ==
=== Club ===
Club	Season	League			Cup		Continental		Total	
Club	Season	League	Apps	Goals	Apps	Goals	Apps	Goals	Apps	Goals
Mes Kerman	2017-18	Azadegan League	2	0	0	0	-	-	2	0
Mes Kerman	2018-19	Azadegan League	4	0	1	0	-	-	5	0
Mes Kerman	2019-20	Azadegan League	11	0	1	0	-	-	12	0
Mes Kerman	Total		17	0	2	0	0	0	19	0
Gol Gohar	2020-21	Persian Gulf Pro League	12	0	2	0	-	-	14	0
Gol Gohar	2021-22	Persian Gulf Pro League	21	1	0	0	-	-	21	1
Gol Gohar	2022-23	Persian Gulf Pro League	16	0	2	0	-	-	18	0
Gol Gohar	2023-24	Persian Gulf Pro League	16	0	1	0	-	-	17	0
Gol Gohar	Total		65	1	5	0	0	0	70	1
Career Total			82	1	7	0	0	0	89	1

== International career ==
=== U20 ===
He is part of Iran U–23 during 2018 AFC U-23 Championship qualification.

== Honours ==
Tractor

- Persian Gulf Pro League: 2024–25
