= Reza Dehghan =

Iranian football player

Personal information
- Full name: Reza Dehghan
- Date of birth: 1 July 1997 (age 29)
- Place of birth: Borazjan, Iran
- Height: 1.87 m (6 ft 2 in)
- Position: Defensive midfielder

Team information
- Current team: Chadormalou
- Number: 76

Youth career
- Shahin Bushehr

Senior career*
Years	Team	Apps	(Gls)
2016–2017	Shahin Bushehr	2	(0)
2017–2018	Foolad	3	(0)
2018–2021	Shahin Bushehr	26	(2)
2021–2022	Arman Gohar	26	(0)
2022–2023	Chadormalou	25	(1)
2023–2024	Mes Shahr-e Babak	16	(0)
2024–	Chadormalou	62	(4)

International career^{‡}
2018–2019	Iran U23		
- * Club domestic league appearances and goals as of 8 January 2018 ‡ National team caps and goals as of 8 January 2018

Reza Dehghan (born 1 July 1997) is an Iranian football player who plays as midfielder for the Persian Gulf Pro League club Chadormalou.
