= Mohammad Saeid Akhbari =

Iranian football manager (born 1986)

Personal information
- Full name: Mohammad Saeid Akhbari
- Date of birth: February 17, 1986 (age 40)
- Place of birth: Tehran, Iran

Team information
- Current team: Chadormalu SC (head coach)

Managerial career
- Years: Team
- 2014–2015: Rah Ahan Tehran (Assistant)
- 2020–2021: Esteghlal Khuzestan (Assistant)
- 2015–2016: Sepahan (Assistant)
- 2017–2018: Foolad (Assistant)
- 2018–2019: Shohadai Babolsar
- 2020: Machine Sazi (Assistant)
- 2020–2021: Machine Sazi
- 2021: Saipa
- 2022–present: Chadormalu

Mohammad Saeid Akhbari (born 17 February 1986) is an Iranian football manager currently serving as the head coach of Chadormalu SC in the Persian Gulf Pro League.

== Coaching career ==
Akhbari began his managerial career with Shohada Babolsar in 2018, achieving a notable average of 1.75 points per match over four games. He later took charge of Machine Sazi in 2020, initially as an assistant before being promoted to head coach. In 2021, he managed Saipa, and since July 2022, he has been at the helm of Chadormalu SC, leading them to promotion to the Persian Gulf Pro League.

== Career statistics ==
=== Managerial record ===
Managerial statistics as of 2025
Club	Tenure	Matches	Wins	Draws	Losses	Win %	Points per match
Shohada Babolsar	2018–2019	4	2	1	1	50%	1.75
Machine Sazi	2020–2021	11	1	4	6	9.1%	0.64
Saipa	2021	14	3	5	6	21.4%	1.00
Chadormalu SC	2022–present	100	45	27	28	45%	1.62

Competition	Tenure	Matches	Wins	Draws	Losses	Points	Points per match
Persian Gulf Pro League	2018–2019	27	8	8	11	32	1.19
Hazfi Cup	2020–2021	1	—	—	1	—	0.00

== Honours ==
- Azadegan League
  - (silver) Runner-up: 2023–24 (with Chadormalu SC)
