= Vitão (footballer, born September 2000) =

Brazilian footballer

Personal information
- Full name: Victor Matheus dos Santos Gonçalves
- Date of birth: 17 September 2000 (age 26)
- Place of birth: Cuiabá, Brazil
- Height: 1.94 m (6 ft 4 in)
- Position: Centre back

Team information
- Current team: Cuiabá

Youth career
- 2015: Penapolense
- 2016: Brasil Central
- 2017: Dínamo de Araxá
- 2018–2019: Capital FC
- 2019: Mixto

Senior career*
Years	Team	Apps	(Gls)
2020	Betis-MG	2	(0)
2021	AA Araguaia	5	(1)
2021	Dom Bosco	0	(0)
2022	Ação	8	(1)
2022	América de Teófilo Otoni	8	(0)
2023	Aruko	12	(2)
2023	→ Cuiabá (loan)	1	(0)
2024	Cuiabá	0	(0)
2024	→ Ituano (loan)	4	(0)
2024–2026	Chadormalou	40	(2)
2026–	Cuiabá	0	(0)
- * Club domestic league appearances and goals as of 18 November 2026

Victor Matheus dos Santos Gonçalves (born 17 September 2000), commonly known as Vitão, is a Brazilian footballer who plays as a central defender for Cuiabá.

== Club career ==
Vitão was born in Cuiabá, Mato Grosso, and represented several teams as a youth before making his senior debut with Betis-MG in the 2020 Campeonato Mineiro Segunda Divisão. He subsequently returned to his native state for the 2021 season, playing for AA Araguaia and Dom Bosco.

On 27 December 2021, Vitão signed for Ação, but ended the 2022 season with América de Teófilo Otoni. In December 2022, he was announced as a part of the Aruko squad for the 2023 Campeonato Paranaense.

On 9 February 2023, after becoming an undisputed starter, Vitão renewed with Aruko until the end of 2024. On 20 March, he moved to Série A side Cuiabá on loan until the end of the year, with a buyout clause.

== Career statistics ==
As of 22 March 2023

Club	Season	League			State League		Cup		Continental		Other		Total	
Club	Season	Division	Apps	Goals	Apps	Goals	Apps	Goals	Apps	Goals	Apps	Goals	Apps	Goals
Betis-MG	2020	Mineiro 2ª Divisão	—		2	0	—		—		—		2	0
AA Araguaia	2021	Mato-Grossense 2ª Divisão	—		5	1	—		—		—		5	1
Dom Bosco	2021	Mato-Grossense	—		0	0	—		—		8 (Note: Appearance(s) in Copa FMF)	1	8	1
Ação	2022	Série D	1	0	7	1	—		—		—		8	1
América de Teófilo Otoni	2022	Mineiro 2ª Divisão	—		8	0	—		—		—		8	0
Aruko	2023	Paranaense	—		12	2	—		—		—		12	2
Cuiabá (loan)	2023	Série A	0	0	—		—		—		—		0	0
Career total			1	0	34	4	0	0	0	0	8	1	43	5
