= Diego Torres (footballer, born 2002) =

Paraguayan footballer

Personal information
- Full name: Diego Joel Torres
- Date of birth: 14 October 2002 (age 24)
- Height: 1.79 m (5 ft 10 in)
- Position: Midfielder

Team information
- Current team: Chadormalou
- Number: 10

Senior career*
Years	Team	Apps	(Gls)
2019–2026	Club Olimpia	16	(4)
2021	→ Celaya (loan)	8	(0)
2024–2025	→ Sportivo Trinidense (loan)	31	(4)
2025	→ Amazonas (loan)	16	(2)
2026	→ Chadormalou (loan)	4	(2)
2026–	Chadormalou	11	(3)

International career^{‡}
2019	Paraguay U17	4	(3)
2019–	Paraguay U18	2	(0)
- * Club domestic league appearances and goals as of 18 December 2025 ‡ National team caps and goals as of 11:19, 15 December 2019 (UTC)

Diego Joel Torres Garcete (born 14 October 2002) is a Paraguayan footballer who plays as a midfielder for Chadormalou.

== Career statistics ==
=== Club ===
As of 15 December 2019.

Club	Season	League			Cup		Continental		Other		Total	
Club	Season	Division	Apps	Goals	Apps	Goals	Apps	Goals	Apps	Goals	Apps	Goals
Club Olimpia	2019	Paraguayan Primera División	7	3	0	0	0	0	0	0	1	1
Career total			1	1	0	0	0	0	0	0	1	1
