= Hojjat Sedghi =

Iranian footballer (born 1993)

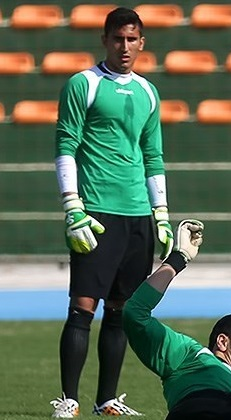

Personal information
- Full name: Hojjat Sedghi
- Date of birth: 7 February 1993 (age 33)
- Place of birth: Kerman, Iran
- Height: 1.87 m (6 ft 1 1/2 in)
- Position: Goalkeeper

Team information
- Current team: Chadormalou
- Number: 1

Youth career
- 2010–2015: Mes Kerman

Senior career*
Years	Team	Apps	(Gls)
2010–2015	Mes Kerman	2	(0)
2015–2017	Paykan	31	(0)
2017–2019	Malavan	39	(0)
2019–2020	Gol Reyhan	25	(0)
2021–2022	Sepahan	0	(0)
2023–	Chadormalou	57	(0)

International career
2012	Iran U20	6	(0)
2013–2014	Iran U23	9	(0)
- * Club domestic league appearances and goals as of 19 March 2021

Hojjat Sedghi (Persian: حجت صدقی; born February 7, 1993) is an Iranian footballer who played as a goalkeeper for Sepahan in the Iran Pro League.

He was a member of Iran national under-20 and Iran national under-23 football teams.

== Club career ==
Sedghi has played most his career with Mes Kerman. He made his debut for Mes Kerman while he used as a substitute against Zob Ahan in last fixture of 2011–12 Iran Pro League.

=== Club career statistics ===
As of 11 May 2012.

Club	Division	Season	League		Hazfi Cup		Asia		Total	
Club	Division	Season	Apps	Goals	Apps	Goals	Apps	Goals	Apps	Goals
Mes Kerman	Pro League	2010–11	0	0	0	0	–	–	0	0
Mes Kerman	Pro League	2011–12	1	0	0	0	–	–	1	0
Mes Kerman	Pro League	2012–13	0	0	0	0	–	–	0	0
Mes Kerman	Pro League	2013–14	0	0	0	0	–	–	0	0
Mes Kerman	Divation1	2014–15	1	0	0	0	–	–	1	0
Paykan	Divation1	2015–16	16	0	1	0	–	–	17	0
Career total			18	0	1	0	0	0	19	0

== International career ==
=== U20 ===
He was part of Iran U–20 participating in 2012 AFC U-19 Championship. He was the first choice of Akbar Mohammadi in qualifiers, but benched during the championship.

=== U23 ===
He invited to Iran U-23 training camp by Nelo Vingada to preparation for Incheon 2014 and 2016 AFC U-22 Championship (Summer Olympic qualification). He named in Iran U23 final list for Incheon 2014.
