= Saeid Mohammadifard =

Iranian footballer

Personal information
- Date of birth: 2 January 1995 (age 31)
- Place of birth: Qaem Shahr, Iran
- Height: 1.75 m (5 ft 9 in)
- Position: Right-back

Team information
- Current team: Chadormalou
- Number: 2

Youth career
- –2016: Pars Jonoubi Jam

Senior career*
Years	Team	Apps	(Gls)
2016–2019	Pars Jonoubi Jam	44	(1)
2019–2022	Saipa	45	(1)
2022–	Chadormalou	118	(1)
- * Club domestic league appearances and goals as of 17 April 2025

Saeid Mohammadifard (Persian: سعید محمدی فرد, born 2 January 1995) is an Iranian footballer who plays as a right-back for Iranian club Chadormalou in the Persian Gulf Pro League.

== Career statistics ==
As of 17 October 2023
Club	Season	League		
Club	Season	Division	Apps	Goals
Pars Jonoubi Jam	2019-20	Azadegan League	0	0
Saipa	2020-21	Persian Gulf Pro League	3	1
Saipa	2021-22	Persian Gulf Pro League	27	1
Saipa	2022-23	Persian Gulf Pro League	11	0
Saipa	2023-24	Persian Gulf Pro League	3	0
Career total			44	2

=== Pars Jonoubi Jam ===
He made his debut for Pars Jonoubi Jam in 7th fixtures of 2017–18 Iran Pro League against Saipa.
