= Amirhossein Jeddi =

Iranian footballer (born 1998)

Personal information
- Full name: Amirhossein Rangraz Jeddi
- Date of birth: 18 October 1998 (age 28)
- Place of birth: Qom, Iran
- Height: 1.76 m (5 ft 9 in)
- Position: Right-back

Team information
- Current team: Zob Ahan
- Number: 23

Youth career
- 2015–2017: Saba Qom
- 2017–2018: Paykan

Senior career*
Years	Team	Apps	(Gls)
2018–2019	Paykan	1	(0)
2019–2020	Aluminium Arak	32	(0)
2020–2022	Paykan	51	(1)
2022–	Zob Ahan	104	(3)
2025	→ Kheybar Khorramabad (loan)	15	(2)

International career^{‡}
2014	Iran U17	1	(0)
- * Club domestic league appearances and goals as of 17 April 2025 ‡ National team caps and goals as of 11 September 2014

Amirhossein Rangraz Jeddi (Persian: امیرحسین رنگرز جدی; born 18 October 1998) is an Iranian professional footballer. He plays as a right-back for Persian Gulf Pro League club Zob Ahan.

== Career statistics ==
As of 6 April 2022

Club	Season	League			Hazfi Cup		Continental		Total	
Club	Season	Division	Apps	Goals	Apps	Goals	Apps	Goals	Apps	Goals
Paykan	2018–19	Persian Gulf Pro League	1	0	0	0	0	0	1	0
Aluminium Arak	2019–20	Azadegan League	31	0	0	0	0	0	31	0
Paykan	2020–21	Persian Gulf Pro League	26	1	1	0	0	0	27	1
Paykan	2021–22	Persian Gulf Pro League	25	0	1	0	0	0	26	0
Paykan	Total		51	1	2	0	0	0	53	1
Zob Ahan	2022-23	Persian Gulf Pro League	30	2	1	0	0	0	31	2
Zob Ahan	2023-24	Persian Gulf Pro League	29	1	2	0	0	0	31	1
Zob Ahan	Total		59	3	3	0	0	0	62	3
Career total			142	4	5	0	0	0	147	4
