= Vahid Rezaei =

Iranian football manager

Personal information
- Place of birth: Shiraz, Iran
- Position: Midfielder

Youth career
- 1992–1993: Bank Melli

Senior career*
Years	Team	Apps	(Gls)
1991–1992	Entezam Tehran	4	(0)
1993–1995	Bank Melli		
1995–1996	Rah Ahan		
1996–1997	Payam Moghavemat	10	(0)
1997–1998	Esteghlal		
1998–2003	Moghavmat Sepasi	79	(4)
2003–2004	Zob Ahan	20	(1)
2004–2006	Moghavmat Sepasi	51	(4)
2006–2007	Pegah Gilan		
2007–2009	Payam Shiraz		

Managerial career
- 2012–2013: Bargh Siraz (assistant)
- 2017: Oxin Alborz (assistant)
- 2017–2018: Damash Gilan
- 2018: Zob Ahan (assistant)
- 2019–2023: Mes Shahr-e Babak
- 2023: Nassaji (assistant)
- 2023: Nassaji (caretaker)
- 2024–2025: Nika Pars Chaloos
- 2025–: Shahin Bandar Ameri
- * Club domestic league appearances and goals

Vahid Rezaei (Persian: وحید رضایی) is an Iranian football manager and a former player who is the manager of Shahin Bandar Ameri in League 2. He played for Fajr Sepasi, Pegah and Esteghlal.

On 20 December 2020, Vahid Rezaei became head coach of Nassaji in Persian Gulf Pro League, replacing Mehdi Rahmati.
