= Tomislav Štrkalj =

Croatian footballer (born 1996)

Personal information
- Date of birth: 2 August 1996 (age 30)
- Place of birth: Zagreb, Croatia
- Height: 1.84 m (6 ft 0 in)
- Position: Striker

Team information
- Current team: Tractor
- Number: 19

Youth career
- 2004–2006: Klokočevac
- 2006–2010: Samobor
- 2010–2012: Inter Zaprešić
- 2013: Dinamo Zagreb
- 2013–2014: Osijek

Senior career*
Years	Team	Apps	(Gls)
2014–2019	Osijek	18	(0)
2014–2015	→ Metalac Osijek (loan)	28	(24)
2016–2017	→ Sesvete (loan)	31	(9)
2017–2018	→ Cibalia (loan)	18	(3)
2018	→ Santarcangelo (loan)	13	(1)
2018	→ Osijek II (loan)	7	(2)
2019	Rio Ave	0	(0)
2019	→ Rudeš (loan)	15	(5)
2019–2023	Tondela	55	(1)
2021	→ Hrvatski Dragovoljac (loan)	14	(2)
2022	→ Auda (loan)	20	(8)
2023–2024	Slaven Belupo	31	(11)
2024–	Tractor	52	(11)

International career
2012	Croatia U17	2	(1)
- * Club domestic league appearances and goals as of 1 August 2025

Tomislav Štrkalj (born 2 August 1996) is a Croatian professional footballer who plays as a striker for Iranian club Tractor.

== Club career ==
Štrkalj spent most of is youth career in several wider Zagreb area clubs, including NK Inter Zaprešić – where he became a Croatia U17 national team player and GNK Dinamo Zagreb where he moved subsequently. He joined NK Osijek's academy, however, in the summer of 2013. In 2014, he was sent on loan to the fourth-tier NK Metalac Osijek where he scored 24 goals in 28 matches. Returning to NK Osijek in the summer of 2015, he signed a five-year professional contract with the club and joined the senior team. Štrkalj made his Prva HNL debut in the 9 August 2015 3–0 away loss against NK Slaven Belupo, coming in from the bench in the 81st minute for Antonio Perošević.

On 14 August 2019 he signed a four-year contract with Portuguese Primeira Liga club Tondela.

On 16 August 2022, Tondela sent Štrkalj on loan to Croatian Football League side Hrvatski Dragovoljac.

In March 2022, Štrkalj was loaned to Latvian club FK Auda.

On 7 August 2023, Croatian Football League side Slaven Belupo announced the free signing of Štrkalj on a two-year deal, after his contract with Tondela had expired.

== Honours ==
Tractor

- Persian Gulf Pro League: 2024–25
- Iranian Super Cup: 2025
