= Segundo Portocarrero =

Ecuadorian footballer (born 1996)

Personal information
- Full name: Segundo Arlen Portocarrero Rodríguez
- Date of birth: 15 October 1996 (age 30)
- Place of birth: Esmeraldas, Ecuador
- Height: 1.82 m (6 ft 0 in)
- Position: Left-back

Team information
- Current team: Leones
- Number: 34

Youth career
- 2012: LDU Quito
- 2013: Independiente del Valle
- 2014–2015: C.S. Emelec

Senior career*
Years	Team	Apps	(Gls)
2016–2020	C.S. Emelec	25	(1)
2018	→ Guayaquil City (loan)	34	(0)
2019	→ C.D. Cuenca (loan)	25	(1)
2020	→ Delfín S.C. (loan)	12	(1)
2021	→ C.S.D. Macará (loan)	26	(4)
2022	Orense S.C.	24	(0)
2023–2025	Barcelona S.C.	26	(1)
2024	→ Universitario de Deportes (loan)	33	(1)
2025–2026	Chadormalou Ardakan	32	(0)
2026–	Leones	2	(0)
- * Club domestic league appearances and goals as of 23 March 2026

Segundo Arlen Portocarrero Rodríguez (born 15 October 1996) is an Ecuadorian footballer who plays as a left-back for Ecuadorian Serie A club Leones.

== Club career ==
Portocarrero played in the youth ranks of LDU Quito in 2012, playing in 19 matches and scoring one goal. In 2013, he moved to Independiente del Valle, where he scored 7 goals in 28 matches.

Portocarrero signed with Emelec in 2014, arriving in the reserve team, where he played 68 matches, scoring 5 goals, before being promoted to the first team for the 2016 season. That year, under manager Alfredo Arias, Portocarrero made his professional debut in a 1–0 home victory against LDU Quito. In 2018, he was loaned to Guayaquil City; in 2019, to Deportivo Cuenca; in 2020, to Delfín SC; and in 2021, to CSD Macará. In 2022, Portocarrero was transferred to Orense SC.

In 2023, he signed for Barcelona SC, where he played both the Ecuadorian Serie A and the Copa Libertadores. In January 2024, Portocarrero's loan to Peruvian club Universitario de Deportes was announced. He became the subject of criticism after a number of matches, due to consideration that his performance did not measure up to what should be expected of a foreign signing, which are limited in number for clubs in the Peruvian league.

== Career statistics ==
=== Club ===
As of match played on 23 March 2026.

Club	Division	Season	League		Cup		Continental		Total	
Club	Division	Season	Apps	Goals	Apps	Goals	Apps	Goals	Apps	Goals
C.S. Emelec	Ecuadorian Serie A	2016	18	0	—		3	0	21	0
C.S. Emelec	Ecuadorian Serie A	2017	7	1	—		0	0	7	1
C.S. Emelec	Total		25	1	0	0	3	0	28	1
Guayaquil City	Ecuadorian Serie A	2018	34	0	—		—		34	0
C.D. Cuenca	Ecuadorian Serie A	2019	25	1	3	0	—		28	1
Delfín S.C.	Ecuadorian Serie A	2020	12	1	1	0	0	0	13	1
C.S.D. Macará	Ecuadorian Serie A	2021	26	4	—		2	0	28	4
Orense S.C.	Ecuadorian Serie A	2022	24	0	2	0	—		26	0
Barcelona S.C.	Ecuadorian Serie A	2023	26	1	—		7	0	33	1
Universitario de Deportes	Liga 1	2024	33	1	—		6	0	39	1
Chadormalou Ardakan	Persian Gulf Pro League	2024-25	12	0	—		—		12	0
Chadormalou Ardakan	Persian Gulf Pro League	2025-26	20	0	2	0	—		22	0
Chadormalou Ardakan	Total		32	0	2	0	0	0	34	0
Leones	Ecuadorian Serie A	2026	2	0	—		—		2	0
Career total			239	9	8	0	18	0	265	9

== Honours ==
Emelec

- Ecuadorian Serie A: 2015, 2017

Universitario de Deportes

- Peruvian Primera División: 2024
