= Chadormalou Ardakan S.C. =

Iranian football club

Chadormalou Ardakan چادرملو اردکان
- Full name: Chadormalou Ardakan Sports Club
- Short name: CSC
- Founded: 2021; 5 years ago
- Ground: Shahid Nassiri Stadium, Iran
- Capacity: 15,000
- Owner: Chadormalu Mining and Industrial Company
- Chairman: Alireza Babaei
- Head Coach: Mohammad Saeid Akhbari
- League: Persian Gulf Pro League
- 2025–26: Persian Gulf Pro League, 6th of 16
- Website: https://sc.chadormalu.com/
Home colours	Away colours	Third colours

Chadormalou Ardakan Sports Club (Persian: باشگاه فوتبال چادرملو اردکان, Bashgah-e Futbal-e Chadormalou Ardakan), commonly known as Chadormalou, is an Iranian football club based in Ardakan, Yazd, that competes in the Persian Gulf Pro League following promotion from the 2023–24 Azadegan League.

== History ==
=== Establishment ===
In 2021, Chadormalou bought Qashqai F.C. and the participation of Qashqai FC in the Azadegan League was given to newly established Chadormalou Ardakan S.C.

=== Azadegan League ===
They held their first competition in Azadegan League in August 2022 and finished Azadegan League on 7th in the end of 2022–23 season. The club was promoted the following season to the Persian Gulf Pro League after finishing 2nd.

=== Persian Gulf Pro League ===
On 10 June 2024, Chadormalou was promoted to the Persian Gulf Pro League for the first time in their history following a 1–0 victory over Babol Caspian Sea on the 34th week of the Azadegan League.

== Coaching staff ==
Current Managers
Manager	(Iran) Mohammad Saeid Akhbari
Assistant Manager	(Iran) Peyman Shirzadi
Assistant Manager	(Iran) Hanif Omranzadeh
Assistant Manager	(Portugal) Cuco
Goalkeeping Coach	(Iran) Hamed Tabatabaei
Fitness coach	(Brazil) Glydiston Ananias
Technical Director	(Iran) Hamid Alidoosti
Team Manager	(Iran) Faraz Fatemi

== Players ==
=== First-team squad ===
As of 27 September 2026

Note: Flags indicate national team as defined under FIFA eligibility rules; some limited exceptions apply. Players may hold more than one non-FIFA nationality.

No.	Pos.	Nation	Player
1	GK	IRI	Hojjat Sedghi
2	DF	IRI	Saeed Mohammadifard (captain)
3	DF	IRI	Alireza Arta
4	DF	IRI	Seyed Mohammadreza Hosseini ^{U23}
5	DF	IRI	Sirous Sadeghian
6	DF	PAR	Rodrigo Alborno
7	MF	IRI	Alireza Safari ^{U23}
8	DF	IRI	Aref Gholami
9	FW	IRI	Mohammad Amin Asadi
10	MF	PAR	Diego Torres
11	FW	ECU	Renny Boboy
12	GK	BRA	Edson Mardden
13	FW	IRI	Reza Mahmoudabadi
14	DF	IRI	Mobin Ghojoghi
16	FW	IRI	Mohammad Taha Tabatabaei
19	MF	IRI	Ali Kamali ^{U23} (on loan from Sepahan)

No.	Pos.	Nation	Player
20	MF	IRI	Aghil Anafjeh
21	FW	IRI	Alireza Bayat ^{U23}
27	MF	IRI	Arsham Mohammadzadeh
30	MF	IRI	Pouria Bali Lashak
33	DF	IRI	Mohammad Zarei ^{U23}
66	MF	IRI	Mohammadtaha Farahani ^{U25}
70	MF	IRI	Abolfazl Isalou
72	MF	IRI	Reza Bahan ^{U23}
76	MF	IRI	Reza Dehghan
77	FW	IRI	Reza Mirzaei
78	MF	IRI	Mohammad Hossein Khosravi
82	DF	IRI	Amir Hossein Kalbasi
83	DF	IRI	Amirreza Shokri ^{U23}
88	FW	IRI	Sajjad Mashhadi ^{U21}
97	FW	IRI	Amirreza Eslamtalab

- U21 = Under 21 year player. U23 = Under 23 year player. U25 = Under 25 year quota.

=== Reserve squads ===
Note: Flags indicate national team as defined under FIFA eligibility rules; some limited exceptions apply. Players may hold more than one non-FIFA nationality.

No.	Pos.	Nation	Player
18	MF	IRI	Amir Mehdi Dehghani ^{U19}
23	MF	IRI	Abolfazl Shourabadi ^{U21}
24	DF	IRI	Seyed Mehdi Hosseini ^{U21}
56	MF	IRI	Aria Arabi ^{U19}

No.	Pos.	Nation	Player
80	FW	IRI	Iliya Negahdari ^{U21}
90	GK	IRI	Amirhossein Asiabanpour ^{U21}
99	GK	IRI	Amirhossein Ahmadsadeghi ^{U19}

== Stadium ==
The home venue of Chadormalou Ardakan is the Shahid Nassiri Stadium (Persian: ورزشگاه شهیدی نصیری) in Ardakan, Yazd, Iran with a 15,000 seating capacity.

== National titles ==
- Azadegan League
  - Runners-up (1): 2023–24
