= Gol Gohar mine =

Largest iron ore mine in Iran

Gol Gohar
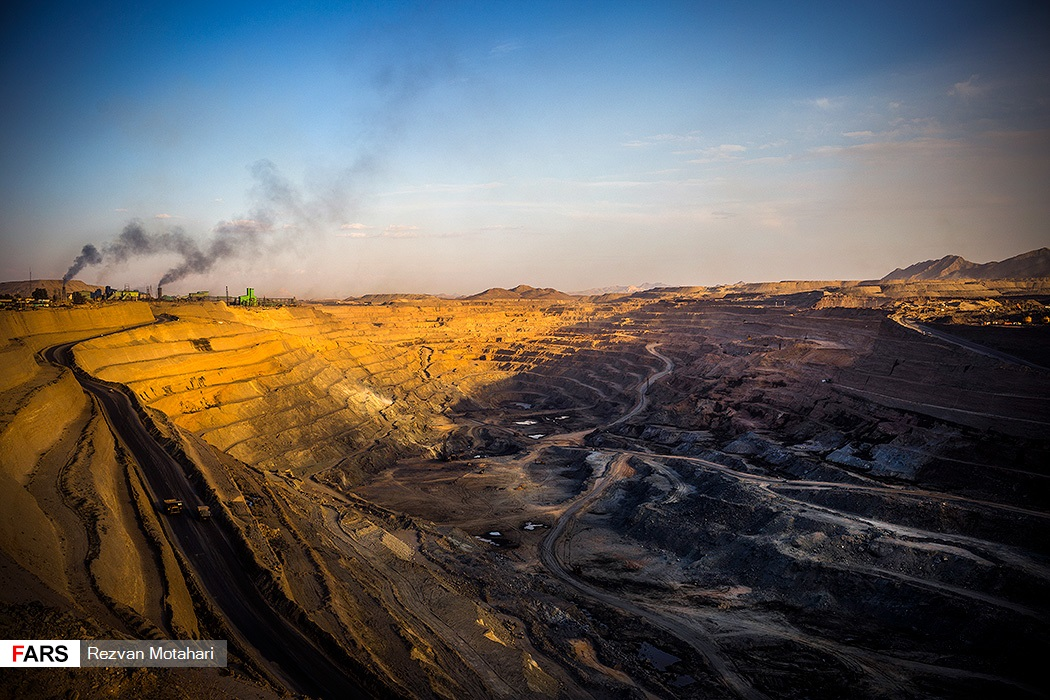
- One of the pits at Gol Gohar

- Location of Gol Gohar within Iran
- Location: Near Sirjan, Kerman, Iran; 29.09272°N 55.32643°E
- Products: Iron ore
- Production: 11 million tons
- Financial year: c. 2006
- Type: Open-pit
- Opened: 1994

Gol Gohar, or Gol-e Gohar (Persian:گل گهر), is the largest iron ore mine in Iran. It has a total iron ore reserve of 1.135 billion tons, and produces about 11 million tons of iron annually as of 2006. It is located about 55 km southwest of the city of Sirjan and is roughly equidistant from the cities of Kerman, Shiraz, and Bandar Abbas.

The Gol Gohar deposits consist of 6 different deposit areas, or "anomalies", in a space of about 10 km by 4 km area. Areas 1 and 2 have been fully mapped, and area 3 has been partly mapped as of 2003. Mining has been done at area 1 since 1994; area 3 has the most extensive iron ore deposits; the other areas are relatively small and as of 2003 there were no plans to explore them further.

== History ==
Iron ore has been mined at Gol Gohar for an estimated 900 years; a large underground mine and smaller open-pit mine in the center of the area used to exist as traces of historical mining activity, but activity since the 20th century has mostly erased these traces. An estimated 350,000 tons of iron ore were extracted from the old mines at Gol Gohar over the course of their existence.

In 1969, the Iran Barite Company began exploratory work at the Gol Gohar site; this was then delegated to the National Iranian Steel Industries Co. (or NISIC), a government corporation that now operates under the name National Iran Steel Company. NISIC then entered into a joint venture with the Swedish company Granges International Mining to continue exploring the deposits. Exploratory drillings began in 1975 on 6 different areas, and mining activity began in 1994.

== Geology ==
The Gol Gohar complex is located in a depression known locally as the Kheyrabad Salt Lake, which itself is located on the northeastern margin of the Sanandaj-Sirjan tectonic-metamorphic belt. The underlying basement rock consists of Paleozoic metamorphic rocks; mainly gneiss, mica schist, amphibiolites, quartz schist, marble, dolomite, and calcite. Above these are Mesozoic and Cenozoic sedimentary rocks and Quaternary alluvial deposits.

The ore body itself is estimated to be lenticular in shape, about 2600 m long from east to west and about 400 m wide from north to south. Several different proposals have been put forward for how it originated: Ljung (1976) suggested a metasedimentary origin, Muke and Golestaneh (1982-91) proposed a magmatic origin similar to the Kiruna mine in Sweden, Hallaji (1992) argued in favor of a metasomatic origin, and Khalili (1993) proposed a volcanic sedimentary origin.

== Gallery ==
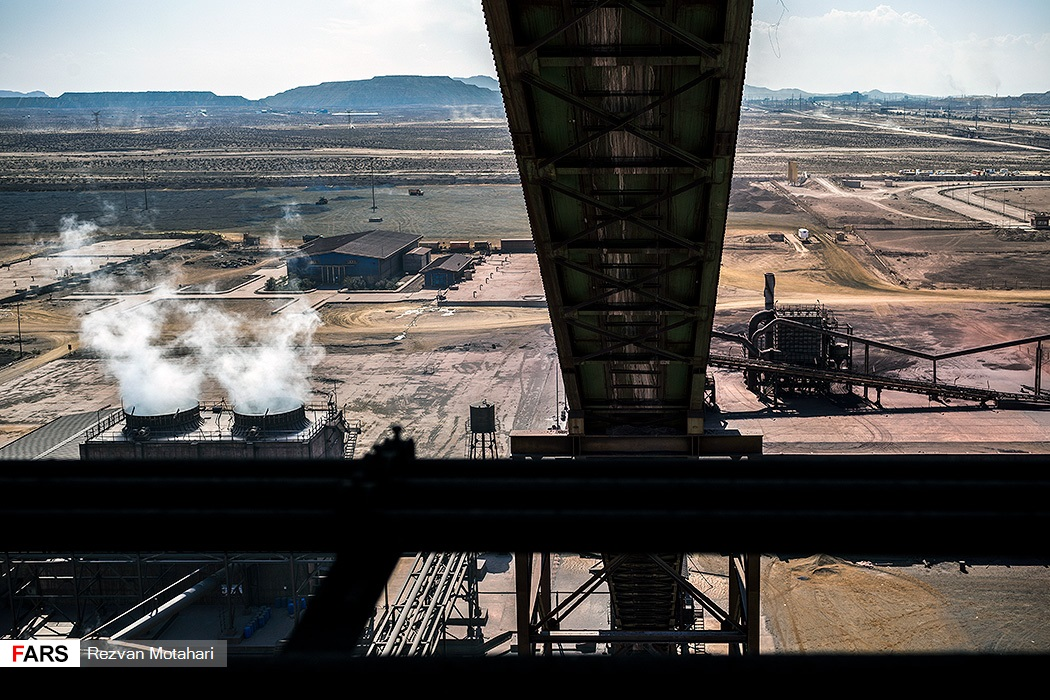

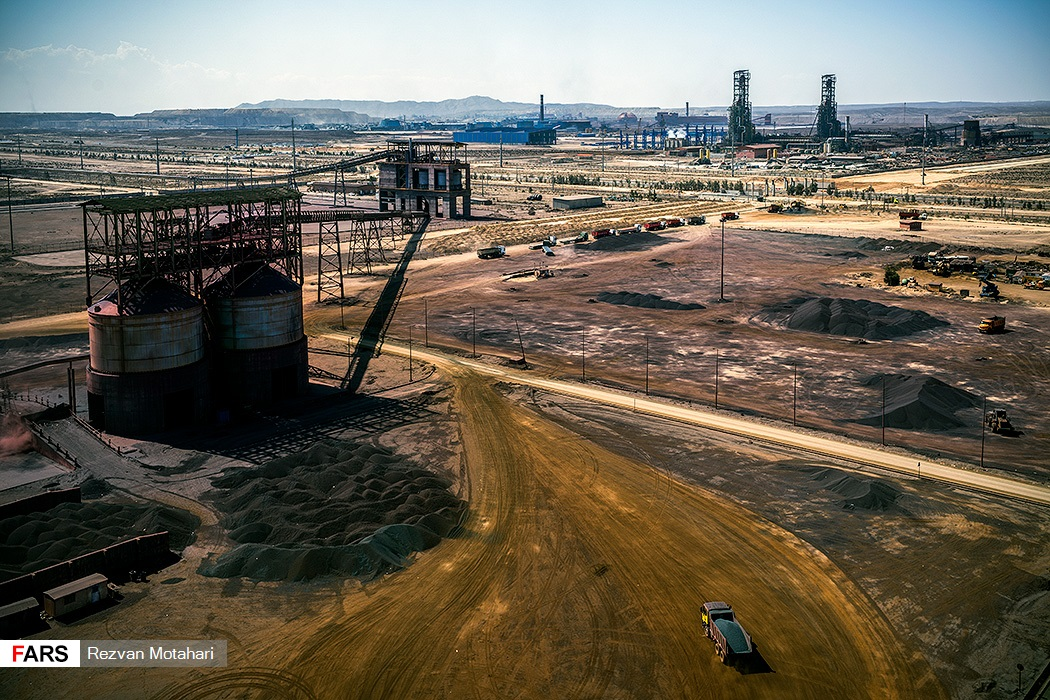

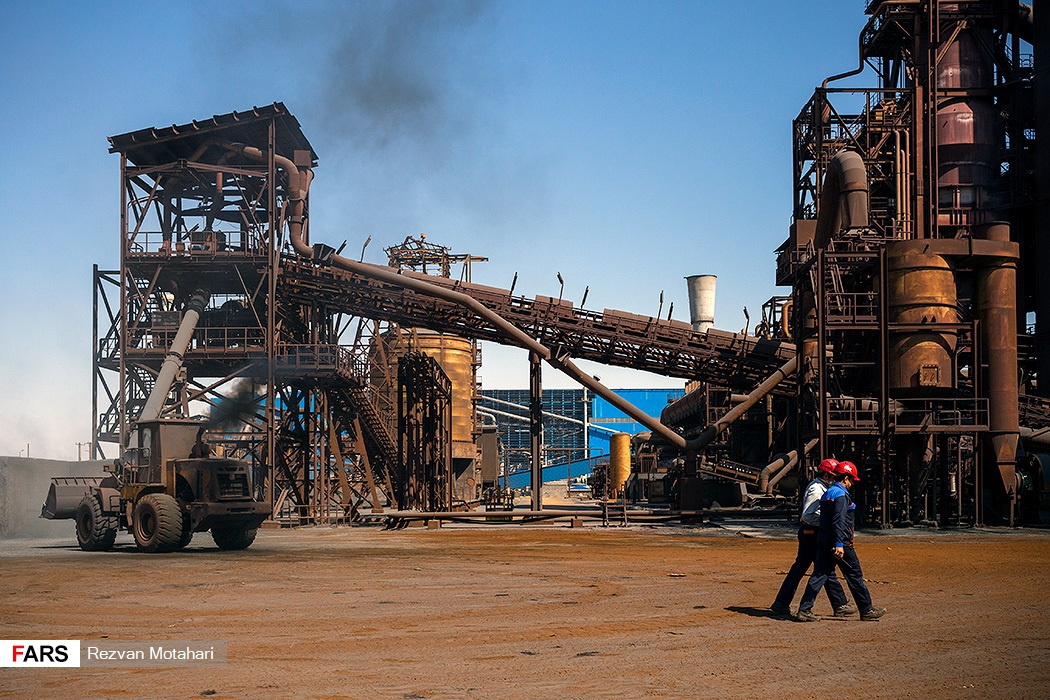

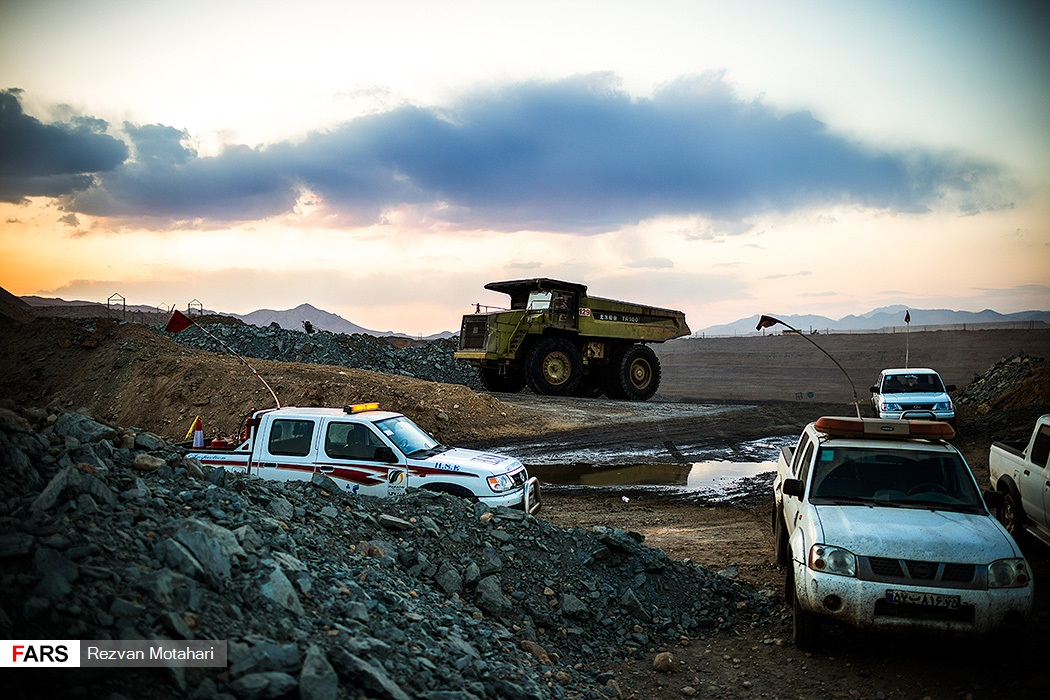

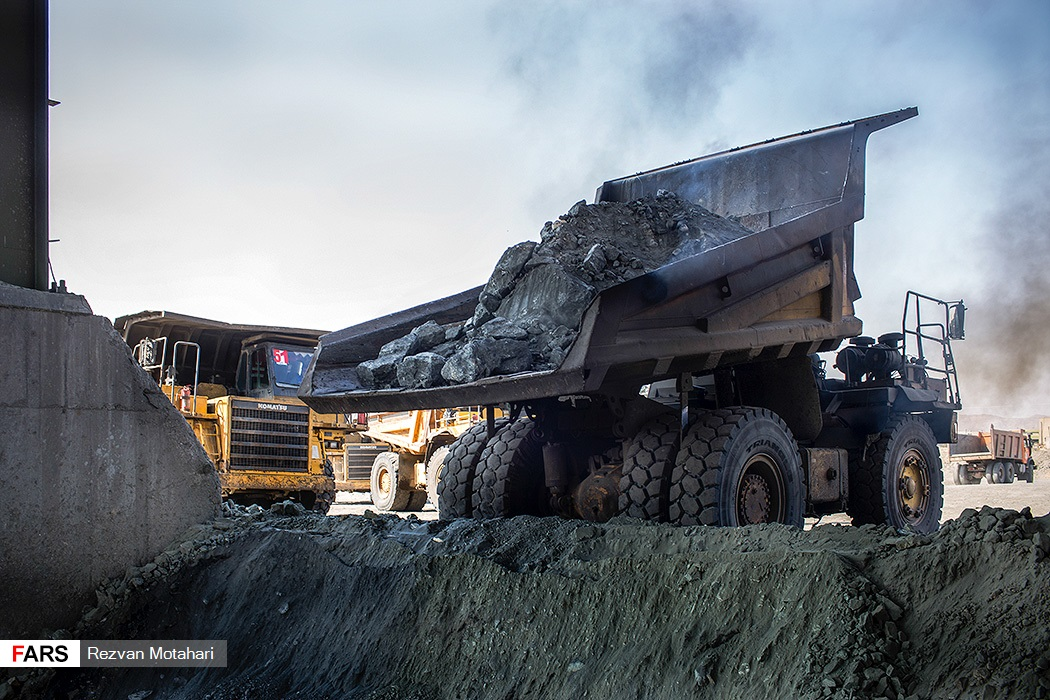

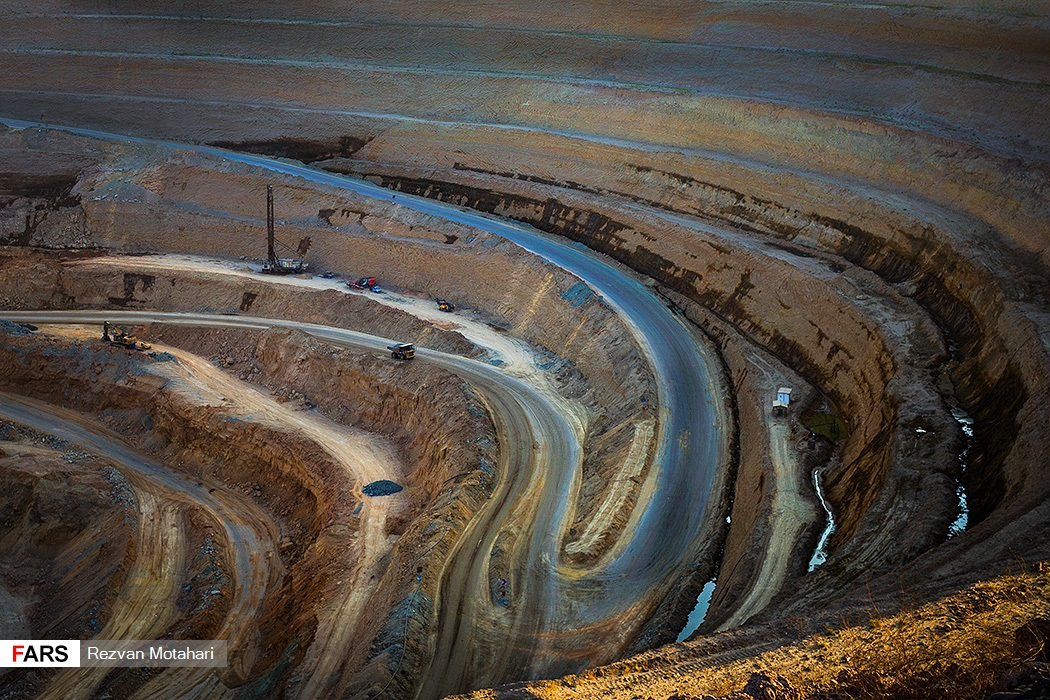

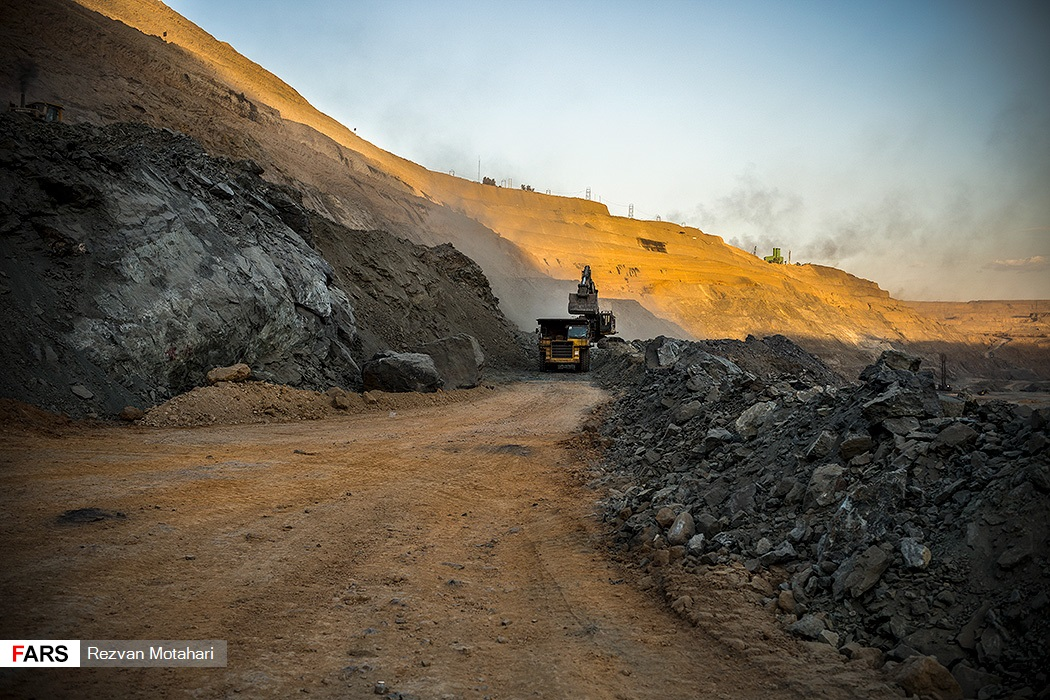

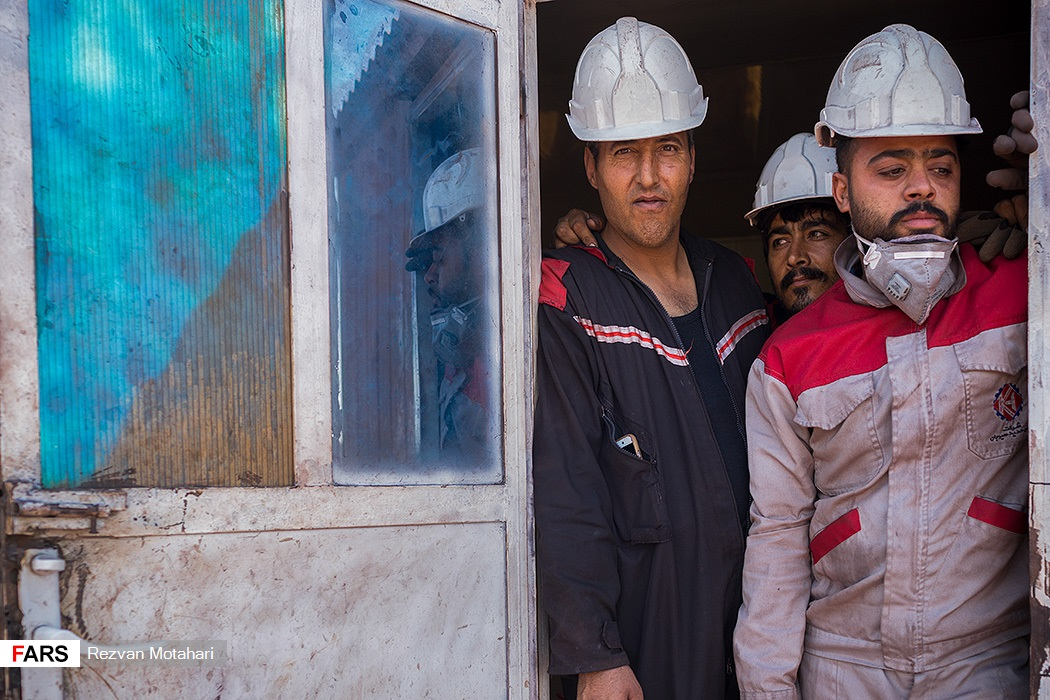

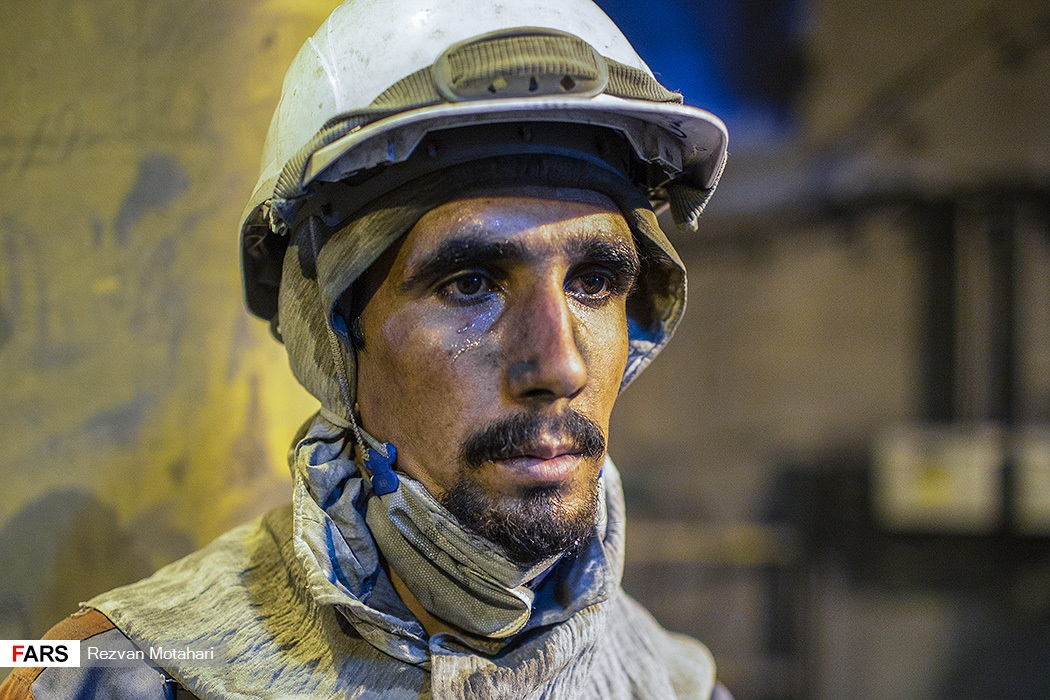

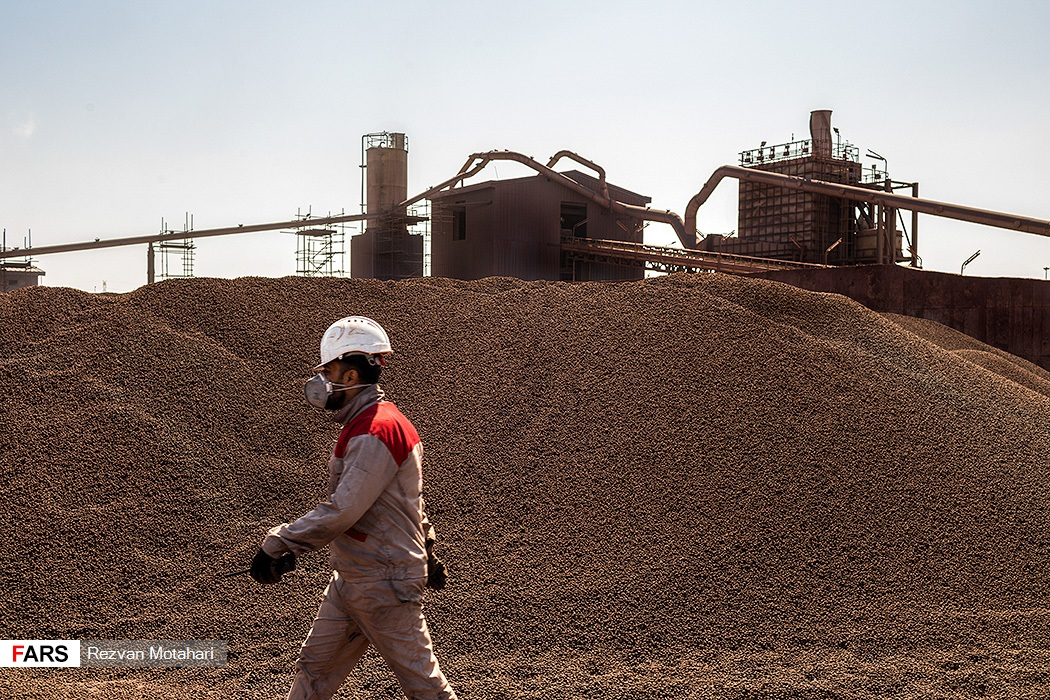

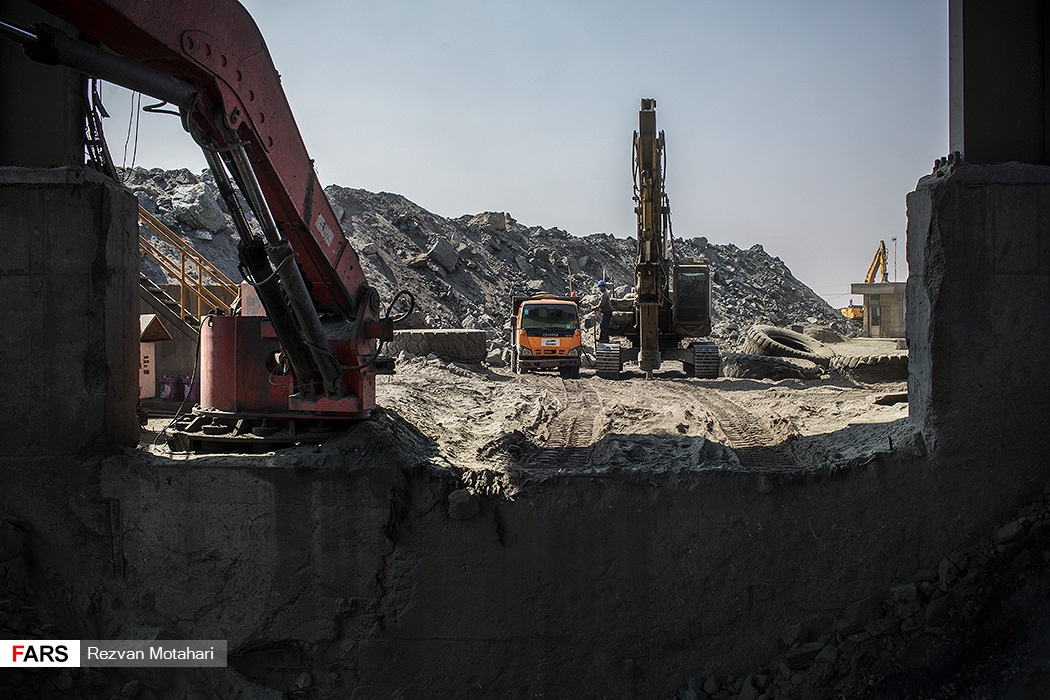
