= Edson Mardden =

Brazilian footballer

Personal information
- Full name: Edson Mardden Alves Pereira
- Date of birth: 12 December 1991 (age 34)
- Place of birth: Combinado, Brazil
- Height: 1.90 m (6 ft 3 in)
- Position: Goalkeeper

Team information
- Current team: Chadormalou
- Number: 12

Youth career
- Internacional

Senior career*
Years	Team	Apps	(Gls)
2012–2014	Arapongas	38	(0)
2013	→ Vila Nova (loan)	0	(0)
2014	→ Nacional-PR (loan)		
2014	Icasa	3	(0)
2014–2017	Criciúma	26	(0)
2016	→ Mirassol (loan)	23	(0)
2018–2021	CRB	50	(0)
2021–2022	Mirassol	10	(0)
2022	Pouso Alegre	18	(0)
2023	São Bento	1	(0)
2023–2024	Amazonas	21	(0)
2024–	Chadormalou	51	(0)
- * Club domestic league appearances and goals as of 16:42, 5 February 2024 (UTC)

Edson Mardden Alves Pereira (born 12 December 1991), known as Edson Mardden or just Edson, is a Brazilian footballer who plays as a goalkeeper for Chadormalou.

== Career ==
Born in Combinado, Tocantins, Edson was an Internacional youth graduate. In 2012, he joined Arapongas, but only made his first team debut in the following year.

On 23 August 2013, Edson was presented on loan at Série C side Vila Nova, but did not play for the club. Back to Arapongas for the 2014 season, he was again a first-choice before being loaned out to Nacional-PR on 10 June of that year.

On 3 October 2014, after a short period at Icasa, Edson was announced at Série A side Criciúma. Initially a third-choice, he made his debut in the category on 23 November, starting in a 1–1 away draw against Flamengo.

Edson spent the following years as a backup to Luiz, also serving a loan stint at Mirassol in the 2016 Campeonato Paulista Série A2. Ahead of the 2018 season, he moved to CRB, but spent the campaign as a backup to João Carlos.

Edson became a regular starter in the 2019 season, but suffered a knee injury which left him sidelined for nearly four months. He shared the starting spot with Victor Souza in 2020, but lost space after the arrival of Diogo Silva in 2021, and left for Mirassol on 15 July of that year.

On 20 May 2022, after being a backup to Darley during the year, Edson signed for Pouso Alegre. On 22 November, he was presented at São Bento for the upcoming season.

On 27 April 2023, Edson was announced at Amazonas. On 4 December, after being mainly a first-choice as the club achieved a first-ever promotion to the Série B, he renewed his contract.

== Career statistics ==
As of 5 February 2024

Club	Season	League			State League		Cup		Continental		Other		Total	
Club	Season	Division	Apps	Goals	Apps	Goals	Apps	Goals	Apps	Goals	Apps	Goals	Apps	Goals
Arapongas	2012	Série D	0	0	0	0	—		—		—		0	0
Arapongas	2013	Paranaense	—		21	0	4	0	—		—		25	0
Arapongas	2014	Paranaense	—		17	0	—		—		—		17	0
Arapongas	Total		0	0	38	0	4	0	—		—		42	0
Vila Nova (loan)	2013	Série C	0	0	—		—		—		—		0	0
Icasa	2014	Série B	3	0	—		—		—		—		3	0
Criciúma	2014	Série A	3	0	—		—		—		—		3	0
Criciúma	2015	Série B	5	0	3	0	0	0	—		—		8	0
Criciúma	2016	Série B	4	0	—		0	0	—		—		4	0
Criciúma	2017	Série B	5	0	6	0	3	0	—		0	0	14	0
Criciúma	Total		17	0	9	0	3	0	—		0	0	29	0
CRB	2018	Série B	0	0	2	0	0	0	—		0	0	2	0
CRB	2019	Série B	16	0	11	0	4	0	—		11 (Note: Appearance(s) in Copa do Nordeste)	0	42	0
CRB	2020	Série B	17	0	3	0	2	0	—		6	0	28	0
CRB	2021	Série B	0	0	1	0	1	0	—		7	0	9	0
CRB	Total		33	0	17	0	7	0	—		24	0	81	0
Mirassol (loan)	2016	Paulista A2	—		23	0	—		—		—		23	0
Mirassol	2021	Série C	10	0	—		—		—		—		10	0
Mirassol	2022	Série C	0	0	0	0	0	0	—		—		0	0
Mirassol	Total		10	0	0	0	0	0	—		—		10	0
Pouso Alegre	2022	Série D	18	0	—		—		—		—		18	0
São Bento	2023	Paulista	—		1	0	—		—		—		1	0
Amazonas	2023	Série C	17	0	—		—		—		—		17	0
Amazonas	2024	Série B	0	0	4	0	0	0	—		—		4	0
Amazonas	Total		17	0	4	0	0	0	—		—		21	0
Career total			98	0	92	0	14	0	0	0	24	0	228	0
