= Amir Khalifeh-Asl =

Iranian footballer (born 1979)

Personal information
- Date of birth: 5 June 1979 (age 47)
- Place of birth: Khoramshahr, Iran
- Height: 1.84 m (6 ft 1/2 in)
- Position: Forward

Team information
- Current team: Esteghlal Khuzestan (manager)

Youth career
- –1998: Foolad

Senior career*
| Years | Team | Apps | (Gls) |
| 1998–2001 | Foolad | 45 | (18) |
| 2001–2002 | Fajr Sepasi | 15 | (1) |
| 2002–2006 | Esteghlal Ahvaz | 82 | (24) |
| 2006–2008 | Foolad | 30 | (5) |
| 2008–2009 | Tarbiat Yazd | 14 | (2) |
| 2009–2010 | Esteghlal Ahvaz | 12 | (1) |
| 2010–2012 | Sh. Bandar Abbas | 39 | (14) |
| 2012 | Aluminium | 3 | (0) |
| 2013 | Sh. Bandar Abbas | 8 | (0) |

International career
| 1998 | Iran U19 | 3 | (1) |

Managerial career
- 2017–2018: PAS Hamedan (assistant)
- 2018–2019: Sh. Bandar Abbas (assistant)
- 2020–2021: Esteghlal Khuzestan
- 2021–2023: Sh. Bandar Abbas
- 2023–2024: Shahrdari Mahshahr
- 2024–2025: Esteghlal Khuzestan (assistant)
- 2025–: Esteghlal Khuzestan
- * Club domestic league appearances and goals

Amir Khalifeh-Asl (Persian: امیر خلیفه اصل; born 5 June 1979) is an Iranian football coach and a former player who is the manager of Esteghlal Khuzestan in Persian Gulf Pro League.

== Club career ==
He served his golden days in Esteghlal Ahvaz.

=== Club career statistics ===
| Club performance | | | League | | Cup | | Total | |
| Season | Club | League | Apps | Goals | Apps | Goals | Apps | Goals |
| Iran | | | League | | Hazfi Cup | | Total | |
|---|---|---|---|---|---|---|---|---|
| 1998–99 | Foolad | Azadegan League | | 10 | | | | |
| 1999–00 | Foolad | Azadegan League | | 4 | | | | |
| 2000–01 | Foolad | Azadegan League | | 4 | | | | |
| 2001–02 | Fajr Sepasi | Pro League | | 1 | | | | |
| 2002–03 | Esteghlal Ahvaz | Pro League | | 7 | | | | |
| 2003–04 | Esteghlal Ahvaz | Pro League | | 9 | | 2 | | 11 |
| 2004–05 | Esteghlal Ahvaz | Pro League | 22 | 5 | | | | |
| 2005–06 | Esteghlal Ahvaz | Pro League | 22 | 3 | | | | |
| 2006–07 | Foolad | Pro League | 20 | 5 | | | | |
| 2007–08 | Foolad | Division 1 | | 0 | | 2 | | 2 |
| 2008–09 | Tarbiat Yazd | Division 1 | 14 | 2 | | | | |
| 2009–10 | Esteghlal Ahvaz | Pro League | 12 | 1 | | | | |
| 2010–11 | Sh. Bandar Abbas | Division 1 | 25 | 9 | | | | |
| 2011–12 | Sh. Bandar Abbas | Division 1 | 14 | 5 | – | – | 14 | 5 |
| 2012–13 | Aluminium | Pro League | 3 | 0 | – | – | 3 | 0 |
| 2013–14 | Sh. Bandar Abbas | Division 1 | | | – | – | | |
| Career total | | | | 74 | | | | |
