= Mohammad Rabiei =

Iranian football manager (born 1981)

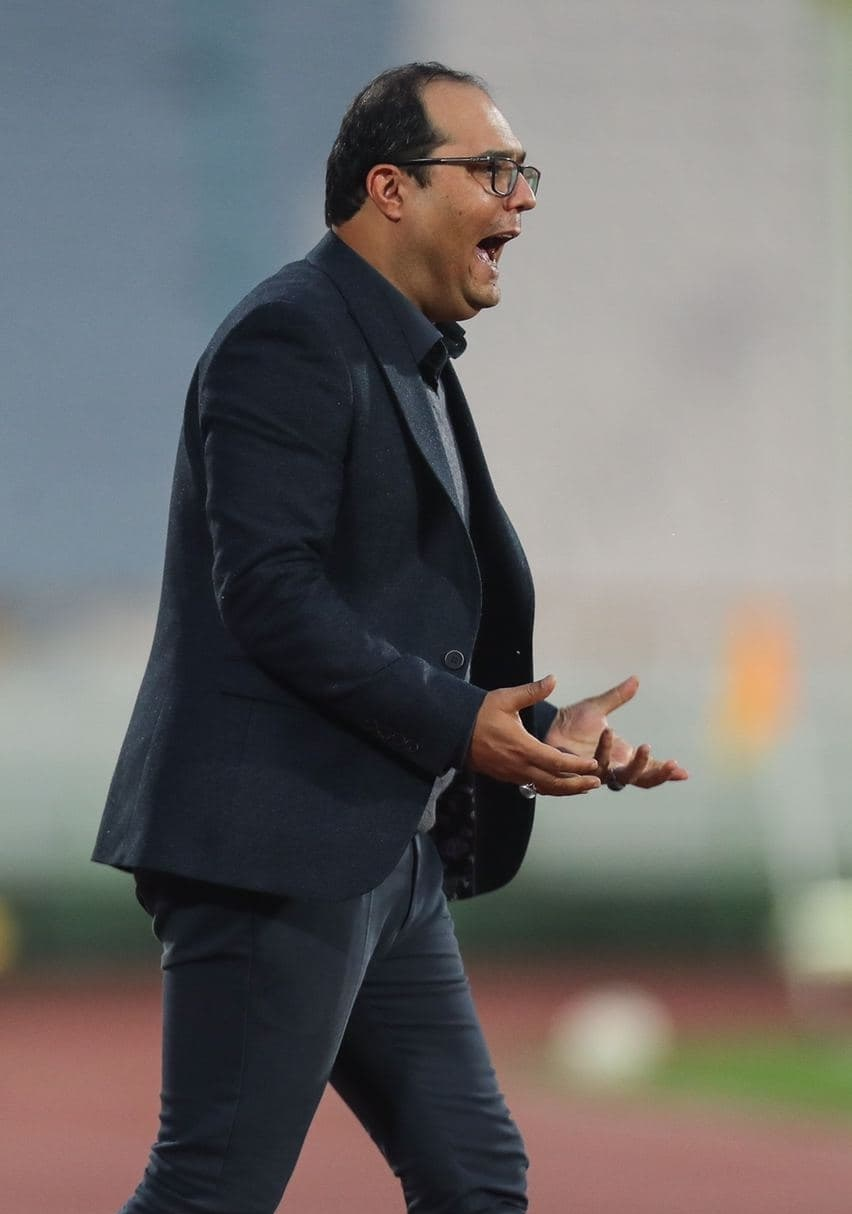

Personal information
- Full name: Mohammad Ali Rabiei
- Place of birth: Tehran, Iran

Team information
- Current team: Zob Ahan (Manager)

Managerial career
- Years: Team
- 2011–2012: Saipa Mehr Karaj
- 2012–2013: Albadr Bandar Kong
- 2013–2014: Shahrdari Ardabil
- 2014: Shahrdari Zanjan
- 2014–2015: Shahrdari Ardabil
- 2015–2016: Baadraan Tehran
- 2016: Shahrdari Bandar Abbas
- 2016–2018: Baadraan Tehran
- 2018–2019: Aluminium Arak
- 2019–2023: Mes Rafsanjan
- 2023–2025: Zob Ahan
- 2026: Tractor
- 2026–: Zob Ahan

Mohammad Ali Rabiei (Persian: محمد علی ربیعی) is an Iranian football manager.

== Honours ==
Albadr

- League 2: 2012–13

Shahrdari Ardabil

- League 2: 2013–14

Mes Rafsanjan

- Azadegan League: 2019–20
