= Chadormalu Mining and Industrial Company =

Iranian mining company

- Company type: Public
- Traded as: TSE: CHML1; ISIN: IRO1CHML0000
- Industry: Commodities; metals; mining
- Founded: 1992
- Headquarters: Tehran, Iran
- Area served: Worldwide
- Products: Metals and minerals; energy products; agricultural products
- Website: chadormalu.com

The Chadormalu Mining and Industrial Company (CMIC; Persian: شرکت معدنی و صنعتی چادرملو, Sherkat-e Ma'dani va San'ati-ye Châdormalu) was established in June 1992 in Tehran, Iran.

CMIC is the main iron ore concentrate producer by direct reduction in the Middle East, with seven million ton per year; it produces up to 1,000,000 ton/year of crushed iron ore for blast furnaces and export.

With a market capitalization of $2 billion in 2007, CMIC is one of the largest companies listed on the Tehran Stock Exchange.

CMIC has been awarded ISO 9001, ISO 14001, and OHSAS 18001 certification.

== See also ==
- IMIDRO -Iranian Mines & Mining Industries Development & Renovation
- Mining in Iran
- Transport in Iran
