= 2025–26 Persepolis F.C. season =

Persepolis
2025–26 season
- President: Reza Darvish (until 18 October 2025); Peyman Haddadi (from 18 October)
- Head coach: Vahid Hashemian (until 26 October 2025); Osmar Loss (from 28 October 2025)
- Stadium: Azadi Stadium
- Persian Gulf Pro League: 2025–26 Persian Gulf Pro League
- Hazfi Cup: Round of 32
Home colours	Away colours

The 2025–26 season is the Persepolis's 25nd season in the Persian Gulf Pro League, and their 43st consecutive season in the top division of Iranian Football. In addition to the domestic league, Persepolis will also participate in this season's Hazfi Cup competitions.

== Kits ==
- Supplier: (Iran) Merooj
- Sponsors: Asan Pardakht , Daria Hamrah

Home	Away	Goalkeeper 1	Goalkeeper 2	Goalkeeper 3	Goalkeeper 4

== Technical staff ==
=== Osmar Loss staff ===
Position	Staff
Head coach	(Brazil) Osmar Loss
Team Coach	(Brazil) Rafael Toledo
First-team coach	(Iran) Karim Bagheri
Assistant coaches	(Iran) Amir Hossein Peiravani
Goalkeeping coach	(Spain) Emilio Álvarez
Assistant Goalkeeping coach	(Iran) Javad Bagheri
Fitness and Athletic Coach	(Spain) Jose Augusto Losada Benítez
Assistant Fitness Coach	(Iran) Saman Eskandari
Analyzers	(Iran) Farzad Habibollahi
Doctor	(Iran) DR Alireza Ghalyayi
Head of the medical committee	(Iran) DR Farid Zarineh
Physiotherapist	(Iran) Ali Aazam Moadi
Team Manager	(Iran) Afshin Peyrovani
Media Officer	(Iran) Mehdi Roozkhosh

Position	Staff
Under-23 team coach	(Iran) Mahmoud Ansari
Youth team coach	(Iran) Mehdi Ataloo
Under-17 coach	(Iran) Farzad Ashoubi
Under-14 coach	(Iran) Hassan Khanmohammadi

== Squad ==
No.	Pos.	Nat.	Name	Age	Since	App.	Goals	Ends	Signed from	Notes
Goalkeepers
1	GK	(Iran)	Payam Niazmand	30	2025	0	0	2027	Sepahan	
22	GK	(Iran)	Amir Reza Rafiei	22	2022	10	0	2026	Nassaji	U-23
68	GK	(Iran)	Mohammad Gandomi	19	2025	0	0	2028	Academy	U-23
Defenders
3	DF	(Iran)	Yaghoub Barajeh	18	2024	13	1	2028	Academy	U-19
4	DF	(Iran)	Milad Mohammadi	31	2024	35	0	2026	(Turkey) Adana Demirspor	
5	DF	(Iran)	Hossein Abarghouei	28	2025	0	0	2028	Kheybar Khorramabad	
6	DF	(Iran)	Hossein Kanaanizadegan	31	2023	136	12	2027	(Qatar) Al Ahli	
8	DF	(Iran)	Morteza Pouraliganji	33	2022	65	2	2027	(China) Shenzhen	
20	DF	(Iran)	Farzin Moamelegari	21	2026	0	0	2028	Shams Azar	U-23
33	DF	(Hungary)	Dániel Gera	29	2026	0	0	2027	(Hungary) Diósgyőri	
74	DF	(Iran)	Alireza Homaeifard	18	2024	0	0	2028	Academy	U-21
76	DF	(Iran)	Soheil Sahraei	21	2023	6	0	2028	Academy	U-23
Midfielders
2	MF	(Iran)	Omid Alishah	33	2013	282	25	2026	Rah Ahan	Captain
7	MF	(Iran)	Soroush Rafiei	35	2022	141	8	2026	Sepahan	
10	MF	(Iran)	Milad Sarlak	30	2020	143	6	2027	Shahr Khodro	
14	MF	(Iran)	Alireza Enayatzadeh	20	2023	7	1	2028	Academy	U-21
21	MF	(Iran)	Mohammad Omri	25	2021	53	5	2029	Academy	
34	MF	(Iran)	Amir Hossein Mahmoudi	18	2025	2	1	2029	Academy	U-21
45	MF	(Iran)	Mohammad Hossein Sadeghi	20	2025	0	0	2029	Havadar	U-23
70	MF	(Uzbekistan)	Oston Urunov	24	2024	40	12	2027	(Uzbekistan) Navbahor	
77	MF	(Iran)	Mohammad Khodabandelou	25	2024	44	1	2028	Mes Rafsanjan	
80	MF	(Iran)	Yasin Salmani	23	2023	19	1	2027	Sepahan	
81	MF	(Iran)	Reza Shekari	27	2025	0	0	2027	Sepahan	
88	MF	(Montenegro)	Marko Bakić	31	2025	0	0	2026	(Greece) OFI	
Forwards
9	FW	(Iran)	Ali Alipour	29	2024	252	87	2026	(Portugal) Gil Vicente	
18	FW	(Iran)	Abolfazl Babaei	20	2023	13	0	2026	Fajr Sepasi	U-21
19	FW	(Uzbekistan)	Igor Sergeev	32	2026	0	0	2028	(Uzbekistan) Pakhtakor	
23	FW	(Republic of the Congo)	Thievy Bifouma	33	2025	0	0	2027	Esteghlal Khuzestan	
69	FW	(Iran)	Mohammad Amin Kazemian	29	2025	0	0	2028	Aluminium Arak	
Players left the club during the season
11	MF	(Iran)	Farshad Ahmadzadeh	32	2024	146	16	2026	Sepahan	
17	FW	(Iran)	Mojtaba Fakhrian	21	2025	0	0	2028	Shams Azar	U-23
93	DF	(Ivory Coast)	Serge Aurier	32	2025	0	0	2026		

Last updated: 26 January 2026.

== Transfers ==
=== In ===
Row	No	P	Nat.	Name	Age	Moving from	Ends	Transfer fee	Type	Transfer window	Quota	Source's
1	21	MF	(Iran)	Mohammad Omri	21	(Iran) Malavan	2029	free	Loan Return	Summer		
2		MF	(Iran)	Mohammad Badpa	21	(Iran) Chadormalou	2027	free	Loan Return	Summer		
3	23	FW	(Republic of the Congo)	Thievy Bifouma	33	(Iran) Esteghlal Khuzestan	2027	free	Transfer	Summer		
4	17	FW	(Iran)	Mojtaba Fakhrian	22	(Iran) Shams Azar	2028	free	Transfer	Summer		
5	69	FW	(Iran)	Mohammad Amin Kazemian	29	(Iran) Aluminium Arak	2028	€438,000	Transfer	Summer		
6	81	MF	(Iran)	Reza Shekari	27	(Iran) Sepahan	2027	free	Transfer	Summer		
7	1	GK	(Iran)	Payam Niazmand	30	(Iran) Sepahan	2027	free	Transfer	Summer		
8	45	MF	(Iran)	Mohammad Hossein Sadeghi	21	(Iran) Havadar	2029	€320,000	Transfer	Summer		
9	88	MF	(Montenegro)	Marko Bakić	31	(Greece) OFI	2026	free	Transfer	Summer		
10	5	DF	(Iran)	Hossein Abarghouei	29	(Iran) Kheybar Khorramabad	2028	€290,000	Transfer	Summer		
11	93	DF	(Ivory Coast)	Serge Aurier	32	Unattached	2026	free	Transfer	Summer		
12	34	MF	(Iran)	Amir Hossein Mahmoudi	19	Academy	2029	free	Transfer	Summer		
13	29	FW	(Iran)	Mohammad Hossein Momeni	19	Academy	2029	free	Transfer	Summer		
Winter In
14	19	FW	(Uzbekistan)	Igor Sergeev	32	(Uzbekistan) Pakhtakor	2027	free	Transfer	Winter		
15	33	DF	(Hungary)	Dániel Gera	30	(Hungary) Diósgyőri	2027	€200,000	Transfer	Winter		
16	20	DF	(Iran)	Farzin Moamelegari	22	(Iran) Shams Azar	2028	€240,000	Transfer	Winter		

=== Out ===
Row	No	P	Nat.	Name	Age	Moving to	Transfer fee	Type	Transfer window	Source
1	21	MF	(Iran)	Saeid Sadeghi	31	(Iran) Foolad	free	Transfer	Summer	
2	72	FW	(Iran)	Issa Alekasir	35	(Iran) Malavan	free	Transfer	Summer	
3	5	MF	(Iran)	Masoud Rigi	34	(Iran) Fajr Sepasi	free	Transfer	Summer	
4	20	DF	(Morocco)	Ayoub El Amloud	31	(Bahrain) Al-Khaldiya	free	Transfer	Summer	
5	3	DF	(Iran)	Farshad Faraji	31	(Iran) Tractor	free	Transfer	Summer	
6	30	DF	(Georgia (country))	Giorgi Gvelesiani	34	(Iran) Sepahan	free	Transfer	Summer	
7	15	MF	(Iran)	Samir Hoboobati	19	(Iran) Aluminium Arak	free	Transfer	Summer	
8	44	GK	(Iran)	Mehrshad Asadi	23	(Iran) Pars Jonoubi	free	Transfer	Summer	
9	29	FW	(Iran)	Alireza Khodadadi	22	(Iran) Paykan	free	Transfer	Summer	
10		MF	(Iran)	Mohammad Badpa	21	(Iran) Shams Azar	free	Transfer	Summer	
11	33	DF	(Iran)	Erfan Mollapour	22	(Iran) Shahin Tehran	free	Transfer	Summer	
12	90	DF	(Iran)	Erfan Shirvani	22	(Iran) Bargh Shiraz	free	Transfer	Summer	
13	67	MF	(Iran)	Hossein Hajizadeh	22	(Iran) Be'sat Kermanshah	free	Transfer	Summer	
14	1	GK	(Algeria)	Alexis Guendouz	29	(Algeria) MC Alger	€400,000	Transfer	Summer	
15	34	MF	(Iran)	Benyamin Alipour	18	(Iran) Gol Gohar	free	Transfer	Summer	
16	27	MF	(Iran)	Saeid Mehri	27	(Iran) Tractor	free	Transfer	Summer	
17	91	FW	(Turkey)	Serdar Dursun	33	(Turkey) Kocaelispor	free	Transfer	Summer	
18	19	MF	(Iran)	Vahid Amiri	37	(Iran) Foolad	free	Transfer	Summer	
Winter Out
19	93	DF	(Ivory Coast)	Serge Aurier	33		free	Transfer	Winter	
20	11	MF	(Iran)	Farshad Ahmadzadeh	33	(Iran) Foolad	free	Transfer	Winter	
21	17	FW	(Iran)	Mojtaba Fakhrian	22	(Iran) Malavan	free	Loan	Winter	

== Pre-season and friendlies ==
=== Pre-season ===
Win Draw Loss Fixtures

17 July 2025 Friendly	Persepolis	2–1	(Turkey) Alanyaspor	Erzurum
17:30	Alipour 27'; Bifouma 47'		Yalçın 38'	Stadium: Erzurum Camp

23 July 2025 Friendly	Persepolis	0–0	(Turkey) Trabzonspor	Erzurum
17:30				Stadium: Erzurum Camp

28 July 2025 Friendly	Persepolis	0–2	(Turkey) Iğdır	Erzurum
17:30				Stadium: Erzurum Camp

5 August 2025 Friendly	Persepolis	2–1	Aluminium Arak	Tehran
18:00	Bifouma 40'; Salmani 113'		Kahrizi 53'	Stadium: Shahid Kazemi Stadium

11 August 2025 Friendly	Persepolis	1–0	Ario Eslamshahr	Eslamshahr
17:00	Alipour 49'			Stadium: Shohada-ye Eslamshahr

19 August 2025 Friendly	Persepolis	0–0	Navad Urmia	Tehran
17:30				Stadium: Shahid Kazemi Stadium

6 September 2025 Friendly	Persepolis	0–0	Mes Rafsanjan	Tehran
17:30				Stadium: Shahid Kazemi Stadium

11 October 2025 Friendly	Persepolis	2–0	Oghab	Tehran
17:30	Kazemian; Alishah			Stadium: Shahid Kazemi Stadium

15 November 2025 Friendly	Persepolis	3–1	Gol Gohar	Tehran
16:00	Alishah; Kazemian		Asadi	Stadium: the earth Number 3 Azadi Stadium

22 November 2025 Friendly	Persepolis	2–1	Palayesh Naft Bandar Abbas	Tehran
16:00	Urunov; Alipour		Ranjbari	Stadium: the earth Number 3 Azadi Stadium

19 December 2025 Friendly	Persepolis	4–0	Oghab	Tehran
14:00	Pouraliganji; Sadeghi; Mahmoudi; Enayatzadeh			Stadium: the earth Number 3 Azadi Stadium

27 December 2025 Friendly	Persepolis	2–1	Ario Eslamshahr	Tehran
14:00	Mahmoudi; Ahmadzadeh			Stadium: the earth Number 3 Azadi Stadium

6 January 2026 Friendly	Persepolis	7–0	(Qatar) Al-Moshireb	Doha
18:00	Alipour; Pouraliganji; Kazemian; Babaei; Mahmoudi			Stadium: Aspire Academy

== Competitions ==
=== Overview ===
Competition	Record							
Competition	Pld	W	D	L	GF	GA	GD	Win %
PGPL	22	9	7	6	23	19	+4	40.91
Hazfi Cup	1	0	1	0	1	1	+0	0.00
Total	23	9	8	6	24	20	+4	39.13

Last updated: 20 February 2026
Source: Competitions

=== Persian Gulf Pro League ===
==== League Table ====
Pos	Team	Pld	W	D	L	GF	GA	GD	Pts	Qualification or relegation
3	Sepahan	22	11	6	5	24	13	+11	39	
4	Gol Gohar	23	11	6	6	26	19	+7	39	Qualification for the 2026–27 AFC Champions League Two group stage (Note: 2025–26 Persian Gulf Pro League was abandoned due to the Iran-Israel war, and the AFC Champions League Two slot was determined through a play-off between the third to sixth-placed teams. The third-placed team (Sepahan Isfahan) failed to obtain club license required to enter the competition and was excluded from the play-offs. Consequently, a play-off was contested between the fourth to sixth-placed teams, with Chadormalu Ardakan emerging as the winner. However AFC had already received fourth-placed team Gol Gohar as the official replacement submitted by the Iran Football Federation before the play-offs.)
5	Persepolis	22	9	7	6	23	19	+4	34	
6	Chadormalou	22	8	8	6	22	21	+1	32	
7	Foolad	22	7	10	5	21	16	+5	31	

Updated to match(es) played on 22 February 2026. Source: Iran Football League Organization - League Full Table
Rules for classification: 1) Points; 2) Head-to-head points; 3) Head-to-head goal difference; 4) Total goal difference; 5) Total goals scored; 6) Fair-play points.
(Note: Head-to-head record is used only after all the matches between the teams in question have been played).

==== Results summary ====
Overall								Home						Away					
Pld	W	D	L	GF	GA	GD	Pts	W	D	L	GF	GA	GD	W	D	L	GF	GA	GD
22	9	7	6	23	19	+4	34	5	5	1	13	6	+7	4	2	5	10	13	−3

==== Results by round ====
Round	1	2	3	4	5	6	7	8	9	10	11	12	13	14	15	16	17	18	19	20	21	22	23	24	25	26	27	28	29	30
Ground	H	A	H	A	H	H	A	H	A	H	A	H	A	H	A	A	H	A	H	A	A	H	A	H	A	H	A	H	A	H
Result	D	W	D	D	D	D	L	W	D	W	W	D	W	W	W	L	W	L	W	L	L	L								
Position	7	6	4	5	5	7	10	7	9	3	2	3	2	2	2	2	1	2	2	4	5	5								
Points	1	4	5	6	7	8	8	11	12	15	18	19	22	25	28	28	31	31	34	34	34	34								

Updated to match(es) played on 20 February 2026. Source: "iranleague".
A = Away; H = Home; W = Win; D = Draw; L = Loss

==== Matches ====
Win Draw Loss Postponed

18 August 2025 1	Persepolis	1–1	Fajr Sepasi	Tehran
19:30 IRST (UTC+03:30)	Rafiei (yellow card) 32'; Bakić (yellow card) 73'; Alipour 90+4'		Shahabi 13'; Mousavi (yellow card) 70'; Motlaghzadeh (yellow card) 90+9'	Stadium: Shohada-ye Shahr-e Qods Stadium; Referee: Vahid Kazemi

25 August 2025 2	Sepahan	0–1	Persepolis	Esfahan
19:30 IRST (UTC+03:30)	Askari (yellow card) 26'; Hajsafi (yellow card) 33' Daneshgar (red card) 90+12'		Alipour 44', (yellow card) 84'; Bakić (yellow card) 45+5'; Niazmand (yellow card) 66'	Referee: Payam Heydari

13 September 2025 3	Persepolis	1–1	Foolad	Tehran
19:00 IRST (UTC+03:30)	Alipour 43'		Soleimani 48'; Lak (yellow card) 81'	Stadium: Shohada-ye Shahr-e Qods Stadium; Referee: Koopal Nazemi

19 September 2025 4	Chadormalou	0–0	Persepolis	Tehran
18:30 IRST (UTC+03:30)	Mardden (yellow card) 90'			Stadium: Takhti Stadium; Referee: Seyed Reza Mahdavi

25 September 2025 5	Persepolis	0–0	Malavan	Tehran
19:00 IRST (UTC+03:30)	Bifouma (yellow card) 40'		Touranian (yellow card) 18'; Alinejad (yellow card) 84'; Eiri (yellow card) 86'	Stadium: Shohada-ye Shahr-e Qods Stadium; Referee: Amir Arab Baraghi

3 October 2025 6	Persepolis	1–1	Gol Gohar	Tehran
18:30 IRST (UTC+03:30)	Ahmadzadeh (yellow card) 3'; Alipour 77' (pen.), (yellow card) 90+3'		Tikdari 57'; Alizadeh (yellow card) 81'; Nemati (yellow card) 90+7'	Stadium: Shohada-ye Shahr-e Qods Stadium; Referee: Koopal Nazemi

18 October 2025 7	Kheybar	2–1	Persepolis	Khorramabad
18:30 IRST (UTC+03:30)	Masoumi 28', (yellow card) 82'; Taherkhani (yellow card) 63'; Yousefi (yellow card) 82'; Moradi 90+6'; Goudarzi (yellow card) 90+13'		Barage (yellow card) 27'; Alipour (yellow card) 40'; Abarghouei (yellow card) 45+1'; Pouraliganji (yellow card) 72'; Alishah 90'; Kanaani (yellow card) 90+3'; Urunov (yellow card) 90+11'	Stadium: Takhti Khorramabad; Referee: Payam Heydari

24 October 2025 8	Persepolis	2–0	Zob Ahan	Tehran
17:00 IRST (UTC+03:30)	Omri 38'; Alipour 82'		Alimohammadi (yellow card) 11'; Mokhtari (yellow card) 62'	Stadium: Shohada-ye Shahr-e Qods Stadium; Referee: Bijan Heydari

30 October 2025 9	Tractor	1–1	Persepolis	Tabriz
18:00 IRST (UTC+03:30)	Khalilzadeh (yellow card) 54'; Hamrobekov (yellow card) 86'; Hosseinzadeh 89'		Ahmadzadeh (yellow card) 43'; Pouraliganji (yellow card) 65' (yellow-red card) 79'; Bakić 90+7'	Stadium: Bonyan Diesel Stadium; Referee: Vahid Kazemi

7 November 2025 10	Persepolis	3–0	Esteghlal Khuzestan	Tehran
16:30 IRST (UTC+03:30)	Rafiei 16', (yellow card) 56'; Kanaani 78' (pen.); Kazemian 90+2'		Sadeghi (yellow card) 72'; Mehdizadeh (yellow card) 81'; Fallahian (yellow card) 82'	Stadium: Shohada-ye Shahr-e Qods Stadium; Referee: Morteza Mansourian

28 November 2025 11	Shams Azar	1–2	Persepolis	Qazvin
16:00 IRST (UTC+03:30)	Mohebi 22'; Sourgi (yellow card) 28'		Rafiei 10'; Sarlak (yellow card) 70'; Urunov 74'	Stadium: Sardar Azadegan Stadium; Referee: Ahmad Mohammadi

5 December 2025 12	Persepolis	0–0	Esteghlal	Arak
15:30 IRST (UTC+03:30)	Rafiei (yellow card) 59'		Hardani (yellow card) 90+1'	Stadium: Imam Khomeini Stadium; Attendance: 10,000; Referee: Vahid Kazemi

9 December 2025 13	Paykan	0–1	Persepolis	Tehran
17:15 IRST (UTC+03:30)	Tavakoli (yellow card) 64'		Bifouma (yellow card) 13'; Urunov 45+3', (yellow card) 64'; Mohammadi (yellow card) 58'	Stadium: Shahid Dastgerdi Stadium; Referee: Amir Arab Baraghi

14 December 2025 14	Persepolis	1–0	Aluminium Arak	Tehran
16:15 IRST (UTC+03:30)	Bifouma 3', (yellow card) 73'; Shekari (yellow card) 88'		Goudarzi (yellow card) 60'; Kahrizi (yellow card) 62'	Stadium: Shohada-ye Shahr-e Qods Stadium; Referee: Hassan Akrami

26 December 2025 15	Mes Rafsanjan	0–1	Persepolis	Rafsanjan
16:15 IRST (UTC+03:30)	Ramezani (yellow card) 39'; Arab (yellow card) 57'; Sedghi (yellow card) 60' (yellow-red card) 70'		Rafiei 24'; Barage (yellow card) 47'	Stadium: Shohadaye Mes Rafsanjan Stadium; Referee: Mooud Bonyadifard

18 January 2026 16	Fajr Sepasi	2–1	Persepolis	Shiraz
14:00 IRST (UTC+03:30)	Shahabi 8'; Jafarikia (yellow card) 31'; Ajhir (yellow card) 45+2'; Sharifi 65'; Rezaei (yellow card) 90+1'		Shekari 21'	Stadium: Pars Stadium; Referee: Bijan Heydari

23 January 2026 17	Persepolis	2–1	Sepahan	Tehran
14:00 IRST (UTC+03:30)	Sarlak (yellow card) 40'; Urunov 53'; Bakić (yellow card) 57'; Sergeev 72'; (red card) 90+5'; Rafiei (yellow card) 81'; Niazmand (yellow card) 90+12'		Yousefi (yellow card) 42'; Haji Eydi (yellow card) 81'; Alves 90+13' (pen.)	Stadium: Shahid Dastgerdi Stadium; Referee: Mooud Bonyadifard

28 January 2026 18	Foolad	3–1	Persepolis	Ahvaz
15:00 IRST (UTC+03:30)	Mahroughi 21'; Ansari (yellow card) 40'; Sarabadani (red card) 88'; Ahmadzadeh 90+1'; Mazraeh 90+4'		Gera (yellow card) 54'; Pouraliganji (yellow card) 76'; Alipour 89' (pen.)	Stadium: Foolad Arena; Referee: Payam Heydari

3 February 2026 19	Persepolis	1–0	Chadormalou	Tehran
16:00 IRST (UTC+03:30)	Mahmoudi 82'; Mohammadi (yellow card) 90+8'; Gera (yellow card) 90+11'		Dehghan (yellow card) 33'; Khosravi (yellow card) 53'; Mashhadi (red card) 57'; Mohammadfar (yellow card) 67'; Portocarrero (yellow card) 85'	Stadium: Shahid Dastgerdi Stadium; Referee: Vahid Kazemi

8 February 2026 20	Malavan	1–0	Persepolis	Bandar-e Anzali
16:00 IRST (UTC+03:30)	Mohammadi 11' (pen.)		Mahmoudi (yellow card) 67'	Stadium: Sirous Ghayeghran Stadium; Referee: Koopal Nazemi

14 February 2026 21	Gol Gohar	3–1	Persepolis	Sirjan
17:00 IRST (UTC+03:30)	Pourali 19'; Ashouri (yellow card) 23'; Latififar 37', 52'; Tomašević (yellow card) 45+3'; Yazdani (yellow card) 45+9'		Sergeev 45+9'; Gera (yellow card) 73'	Stadium: Shahid Qasem Soleimani Stadium (Sirjan); Referee: Mooud Bonyadifard

20 February 2026 22	Persepolis	1–2	Kheybar	Tehran
19:00 IRST (UTC+03:30)	Bakić (yellow card) 64'; Gera (yellow card) 69'; Sergeev 89'		Hosseini 12'; Yousefi (yellow card) 32'; Sefidchogaei (yellow card) 38'; Pour Hamidi (yellow card) 39'; Khanzadi (yellow card) 65'; Babaei 72' (pen.)	Stadium: Shahid Dastgerdi Stadium; Referee: Bijan Heydari

28 February 2026 23	Zob Ahan	v	Persepolis	Fuladshahr
19:00 IRST (UTC+03:30)				Stadium: Foolad Shahr Stadium

6 March 2026 24	Persepolis	v	Tractor	Tehran
19:00 IRST (UTC+03:30)				Stadium: Shahid Dastgerdi Stadium

15 March 2026 25	Esteghlal Khuzestan	v	Persepolis	Ahvaz
19:00 IRST (UTC+03:30)				Stadium: ?

26	Persepolis	v	Shams Azar	Tehran
				Stadium: Shohada-ye Shahr-e Qods Stadium

27	Esteghlal	v	Persepolis	Tehran
				Stadium: ?

28	Persepolis	v	Paykan	Tehran
				Stadium: Shohada-ye Shahr-e Qods Stadium

29	Aluminium Arak	v	Persepolis	Arak
				Stadium: Imam Khomeini Stadium

30	Persepolis	v	Mes Rafsanjan	Tehran
				Stadium: Shohada-ye Shahr-e Qods Stadium

==== Score overview ====
Win Draw Loss

Opposition	Home score	Away score	Aggregate score
Aluminium	1–0		1–0
Chadormalou	1–0	0–0	1–0
Esteghlal	0–0		0–0
Esteghlal Khuzestan	3–0		3–0
Fajr Sepasi	1–1	1–2	2–3
Foolad	1–1	1–3	2–4
Gol Gohar	1–1	1–3	2–4
Kheybar	1–2	1–2	2–4
Malavan	0–0	0–1	0–1
Mes Rafsanjan		1–0	1–0
Paykan		1–0	1–0
Sepahan	2–1	1–0	3–1
Shams Azar		2–1	2–1
Tractor		1–1	1–1
Zob Ahan	2–0		2–0

=== Hazfi Cup ===
Win Draw Loss Postponed

18 December 2025 Round of 32	Tractor	1–1 (a.e.t.) (8–7 p)	Persepolis	Tabriz
16:15 IRST (UTC+03:30)	Naderi (yellow card) 27' (yellow-red card) 104'; Torabi 56'; Beiranvand (yellow card) 90+4'; Hosseinzadeh (yellow card) 90+5'		Urunov (yellow card) 25'; Kanaanizadegan 90+6' (yellow card) 90+6'; Bakić (yellow card) 108'; Omri (yellow card) 120'	Stadium: Yadegar-e Emam Tabriz; Referee: Bijan Heydari
	Penalties
	Hosseinzadeh (penalty missed); Esmaeilifar (penalty missed); Zaerkazemayn (penalty scored); Hamrobekov (penalty scored); Karimazar (penalty scored); Sedlar (penalty scored); Faraji (penalty missed); Khalilzadeh (penalty scored); Shiri (penalty scored); Beiranvand (penalty scored); Hosseinzadeh (penalty scored)		Kanaanizadegan (penalty scored); Bakić (penalty missed); Kazemian (penalty scored); Pouraliganji (penalty missed); Alipour (penalty scored); Ahmadzadeh (penalty scored); Omri (penalty missed); Shekari (penalty scored); Mohammadi (penalty scored); Niazmand (penalty scored); Kanaanizadegan (penalty missed)

== Statistics ==
=== Goal scorers ===
Player left the club during the season.

Place	Number	Nation	Position	Name	PGPL	Hazfi Cup	Total
1	9	(Iran)	FW	Ali Alipour	6		6
2	7	(Iran)	MF	Soroush Rafiei	3		3
2	70	(Uzbekistan)	MF	Oston Urunov	3		3
2	19	(Uzbekistan)	FW	Igor Sergeev	3		3
3	6	(Iran)	DF	Hossein Kanaanizadegan	1	1	2
4	2	(Iran)	MF	Omid Alishah	1		1
4	21	(Iran)	MF	Mohammad Omri	1		1
4	23	(Republic of the Congo)	FW	Thievy Bifouma	1		1
4	34	(Iran)	MF	Amir Hossein Mahmoudi	1		1
4	69	(Iran)	FW	Mohammad Amin Kazemian	1		1
4	81	(Iran)	MF	Reza Shekari	1		1
4	88	(Montenegro)	MF	Marko Bakić	1		1

=== Assists ===
Place	Number	Nation	Position	Name	PGPL	Hazfi Cup	Total
1	9	(Iran)	FW	Ali Alipour	6	1	7
2	4	(Iran)	DF	Milad Mohammadi	3		3
3	23	(Republic of the Congo)	FW	Thievy Bifouma	2		2
3	70	(Uzbekistan)	MF	Oston Urunov	2		2
4	2	(Iran)	MF	Omid Alishah	1		1
4	8	(Iran)	DF	Morteza Pouraliganji	1		1
4	77	(Iran)	MF	Mohammad Khodabandelou	1		1

=== Hatricks ===
Place	Player	vs	score	date	Competition
Last updated: 19 March 2025

=== Clean sheets ===
Rank	No.	Nat.	Player	PGPL	CL	Hazfi Cup	CL	Total	CL Total
1	1	(Iran)	Payam Niazmand	21	10	1	0	22	10
2	22	(Iran)	Amir Reza Rafiei	1	0	0	0	1	0
3	68	(Iran)	Mohammad Gandomi	0	0	0	0	0	0
Totals				22	10	1	0	23	10
