= 2024–25 Tractor S.C. season =

Tractor
2024–25 season
- Chairman: Mohammad Reza Zonuzi
- Manager: Dragan Skočić
- Stadium: Sahand Stadium
- Pro League: 1st (champions)
- Hazfi Cup: Round of 16
- AFC Champions League Two: Quarter-finals
- Average home league attendance: 44,071
Home colours	Away colours	Third colours

The 2024–25 season was the Tractor Sport Club's 17th season in the Pro League, and their 16th consecutive season in the top division of Iranian Football. They are also competing in the Hazfi Cup and AFC Champions League.

== Players ==
=== Current squad ===
As of 30 August 2025

Note: Flags indicate national team as defined under FIFA eligibility rules; some limited exceptions apply. Players may hold more than one non-FIFA nationality.

No.	Pos.	Nation	Player
1	GK	IRI	Alireza Beiranvand
2	DF	IRI	Mehdi Shiri
3	DF	IRI	Shojae Khalilzadeh (captain)
4	DF	SRB	Aleksandar Sedlar
5	DF	IRI	Milad Kor ^{U23}
6	MF	IRI	Mehdi Hosseini
7	MF	CRO	Tibor Halilović
8	MF	CRO	Igor Postonjski
9	FW	IRI	Mehdi Torabi
11	DF	IRI	Danial Esmaeilifar (Vice Captain)
17	DF	IRI	Saeid Karimazar^{U25}
18	DF	IRI	Sadegh Moharrami
19	FW	CRO	Tomislav Štrkalj

No.	Pos.	Nation	Player
20	FW	IRI	Mehdi Hashemnejad (4th Captain)
21	MF	UZB	Odiljon Hamrobekov
22	DF	IRI	Mohammad Naderi (3rd Captain)
25	FW	CRO	Domagoj Drožđek
30	GK	SWE	Marko Johansson
31	MF	ALB	Regi Lushkja
33	DF	IRI	Farshad Faraji
44	DF	IRI	Erfan Darvishaali^{U21}
49	GK	IRI	Adib Zarei^{U23}
77	FW	IRI	Mehrdad Mohammadi
88	FW	IRI	Masoud ZaerKazemayn
98	FW	IRI	Amirreza Jeddi^{U21}
99	FW	IRI	Amirhossein Hosseinzadeh

- U21 = Under 21 year player. U23 = Under 23 year player. INJ = Out of main squad due to injury.

For recent transfers, see List of Iranian football transfers summer 2025.

=== Reserve team players ===
Note: Flags indicate national team as defined under FIFA eligibility rules; some limited exceptions apply. Players may hold more than one non-FIFA nationality.

No.	Pos.	Nation	Player
27	FW	IRI	Amirali Khorrami^{U21}
50	DF	IRI	Hojjat Ahmadi^{U23}
70	GK	IRI	Erfan Najari^{U23}

No.	Pos.	Nation	Player
72	FW	IRI	Amin Eimery^{U21}
80	MF	IRI	Shahin Shojaei^{U23}
83	GK	IRI	Mani Sharifnejad ^{U21}

=== Out on loan ===
Note: Flags indicate national team as defined under FIFA eligibility rules; some limited exceptions apply. Players may hold more than one non-FIFA nationality.

No.	Pos.	Nation	Player
—	MF	IRI	Amirreza Firouzbakht^{U23} (at Rakhsh Azarbaijan)
—	DF	IRI	Morteza Javaheri^{U23} (at Rakhsh Azarbaijan)

No.	Pos.	Nation	Player
—	FW	IRI	Mehdi Abdi (at Malavan)

== Competitions ==
=== Overview ===
Competition	Starting round	Record							
Competition	Starting round	Pld	W	D	L	GF	GA	GD	Win %
Pro League	Matchday 1	30	21	5	4	57	19	+38	70.00
Hazfi Cup	Round of 32	0	0	0	0	0	0	+0	—
AFC Champions League Two	Group Stage	2	2	0	0	6	1	+5	100.00
Total		32	23	5	4	63	20	+43	71.88

Last updated: 15 May 2025.
Source: Competitions

=== Persian Gulf Pro League ===
==== Standings ====
Pos	Team	Pld	W	D	L	GF	GA	GD	Pts	Qualification or relegation
1	Tractor (C)	30	21	5	4	57	19	+38	68	Qualification for the 2025–26 AFC Champions League Elite phase
2	Sepahan	30	16	12	2	48	21	+27	60 (Note: Sepahan finished ahead of Persepolis on head-to-head points: Sepahan 6, Persepolis 0)	Qualification for the 2025–26 AFC Champions League Elite qualifying play-offs
3	Persepolis	30	18	6	6	42	20	+22	60	
4	Foolad	30	15	8	7	36	30	+6	53	
5	Gol Gohar	30	12	11	7	23	16	+7	47	

Source: Iran Football League Organization - League Full Table, Iplstats
Rules for classification: 1) Points; 2) Head-to-head points; 3) Head-to-head goal difference; 4) Total goal difference; 5) Total goals scored; 6) Fair-play points.
(Note: Head-to-head record is used only after all the matches between the teams in question have been played).
(C) Champions

==== Results summary ====
Overall								Home						Away					
Pld	W	D	L	GF	GA	GD	Pts	W	D	L	GF	GA	GD	W	D	L	GF	GA	GD
30	21	5	4	57	19	+38	68	9	3	3	28	11	+17	12	2	1	29	8	+21

Last updated: 15 May 2025.
Source: soccerway

==== Results by round ====
Round	1	2	4	3	5
Ground	A	H	A	H	A
Result	W	D	W	L	W
Position	2	2	2	3	3

Updated to match(es) played on 22 September 2024. Source: "Ipl".
A = Away; H = Home; W = Win; D = Draw; L = Loss; P = Postponed

==== Matches ====
16 August 2024 1	Rafsanjan	0-2	Tractor	Rafsanjan
19:15 IRST		Report	Hosseinzadeh 10'; Štrkalj 28'	Stadium: Mes Rafsanjan Stadium; Referee: (Iran) Mohammadreza Tarokh

22 August 2024 2	Tractor	1-1	Persepolis	Tabriz
19:45 IRST	Khalilzadeh 60'	Report	El Amloud 89'	Stadium: Yadegar-e Emam Stadium; Referee: (Iran) Seyed Vahid Kazemi

29 August 2024 3	Havadar	0-4	Tractor	Tehran
19:15 IRST		Report	Hashemnejad 29'; Štrkalj 58'; Hosseinzadeh 75' 85'	Stadium: Shahid Dastgerdi Stadium; Referee: (Iran) Morteza Mansourian

13 September 2024 4	Tractor	0-1	Zob Ahan	Tabriz
19:30 IRST	Hosseinzadeh (yellow card) 61' (yellow-red card) 75'; Torabi (yellow card) 73'	Report	Pedram Ghazipour (yellow card) 24'; Omid Latifi 67'	Stadium: Yadegar-e Emam Stadium; Referee: (Iran) Hassan Akrami

22 September 2024 5	Kheybar	1-2	Tractor	Khorramabad
19:00 IRST	Ghanbari 14' (pen.) (yellow card) 29'; Naghizadeh (yellow card) 34'; Alireza Daghagheleh (yellow card) 39'	Report	Ricardo Alves 12'; Esmaeilifar 61'	Stadium: Takhti Stadium; Referee: (Iran) Payam Heydari

27 September 2024 6	Sepahan	0-1	Tractor	Isfahan
18:30 IRST	Mohammadi (yellow card) 63'; Hazbavi (yellow card) 64'; Yousefi (yellow card) 90+3'	Report	Torabi (red card) 31'; Hosseinzadeh 45+3'; Beiranvand (yellow card) 66'; Khalilzadeh (yellow card) 79'	Stadium: Naghsh-e Jahan Stadium; Referee: (Iran) Seyed Vahid Kazemi

6 October 2024 7	Tractor	1-2	Foolad	Tabriz
17:30 IRST	Postonjski (yellow card) 31' (yellow-red card) 45+4'; Štrkalj 40'	Report	Ansari (yellow card) 31' (goal) 54'; Asadbeigi 45+6'; Nemati (yellow card) 67'; Yusupov (yellow card) 80'; Najjarian (yellow card) 80'	Stadium: Yadegar-e Emam Stadium; Referee: (Iran) Amir Arab Baraghi

27 October 2024 9	Tractor	2-0	Aluminium Arak	Tabriz
16:00 IRST	Štrkalj 6'; Hashemnejad 14'	Report		Stadium: Yadegar-e Emam Stadium

31 October 2024 10	Esteghlal	0-2	Tractor	Tehran
16:45 IRST	Kakuta (yellow card) 32'; Cheshmi (yellow card) 42'; Ndong (yellow card) 45+2'	Report	Khalilzadeh (yellow card) 45+1'; Naderi (yellow card) 45+2'; Aghasi 56'; Postonjski (yellow card) 60'; Ashouri (yellow card) 83' (goal) 87'; Hosseinzadeh (yellow card) 90+3'	Stadium: Azadi Stadium; Attendance: 8,000

3 December 2024 11	Tractor	1-0	Chadormalou	Tabriz
15:30 IRST	Hosseinzadeh (yellow card) 37'; Ricardo Alves (yellow card) 70'; Hashemnejad 84'	Report	Habibinejad (yellow card) 45'; Vitão (yellow card) 90+2'	Stadium: Yadegar-e Emam Stadium; Attendance: 5,000

9 December 2024 8	Gol Gohar	0-2	Tractor	Sirjan
16:30 IRST	Majid Eidi (yellow card) 33'	Report	Torabi (yellow card) 9'; Postonjski (red card) 45+2'; Štrkalj 68' (yellow card) 68'; Hashemnejad 76'; Esmaeilifar (yellow card) 82'	Stadium: Gol Gohar Sport Complex; Attendance: 3,000

=== Hazfi Cup ===
22 November 2024 Round of 32	Tractor	1-2	Gol Gohar	Tabriz
14:00	Cikalleshi 18' (pen.)	Report	Tikdari 41'; Pouria Latififar 64'	Stadium: Yadegar-e Emam Stadium

=== AFC Champions League Two ===
==== Group A ====
Pos	Team	Pld	W	D	L	GF	GA	GD	Pts	Qualification	TRA	WAK	RAV	MBSG
1	(Iran) Tractor	4	3	1	0	16	4	+12	10	Advance to round of 16	—	3–3	7–0	~~2 Oct~~
2	(Qatar) Al-Wakrah	4	1	1	2	4	8	−4	4	Advance to round of 16	0–3	—	0–2	~~6 Nov~~
3	(Tajikistan) Ravshan Kulob	4	1	0	3	3	11	−8	3		1–3	0–1	—	~~27 Nov~~
4	(India) Mohun Bagan SG	0	0	0	0	0	0	0	0	Withdrew, record expunged (Note: On 7 October 2024, AFC announced that Mohun Bagan SG were considered to have withdrawn from the AFC Champions League Two after they failed to appear for their fixture against Tractor in Tabriz due to safety concerns. Their single match was expunged.)	~~4 Dec~~	~~23 Oct~~	~~0–0~~	—

Source: AFC
Rules for classification: Tiebreakers
Notes:

18 September 2024 1	Al-Wakrah (Qatar)	0-3	(Iran) Tractor	Al Wakrah
17:00	Fathy (yellow card) 53'; Mendes	Report	Štrkalj 13'; Torabi 16'; Gholami (yellow card) 34'; Hosseinzadeh 38'; Khalilzadeh (yellow card) 48'	Stadium: Al Janoub Stadium; Attendance: 3,476; Referee: (Uzbekistan) Rustam Lutfullin

23 October 2024 2	Ravshan Kulob (Tajikistan)	1-3	(Iran) Tractor	Dushanbe
15:00	Rakhimov (yellow card) 55'; Nazarov (yellow card) 72'; Mawutor 90+2'	Report	Hosseinzadeh 26' 32'; Štrkalj 80'	Stadium: Republican Central Stadium; Attendance: 4,729; Referee: (Australia) Alex King

6 November 2024 3	Tractor (Iran)	7-0	(Tajikistan) Ravshan Kulob	Al Rayyan
19:00	Nazarov 4' (o.g.); Cikalleshi 14' 25' 27'; Shiri (yellow card) 38'; Hosseinzadeh 45+2' 69'; Ricardo Alves 49'	Report	Nazarov (yellow card) 49'; Dzhamshed Murodov (yellow card) 60'	Stadium: Thani bin Jassim Stadium; Attendance: 200; Referee: (Jordan) Ahmad Ibrahim
