= Mehdi Hashemnejad =

Iranian footballer

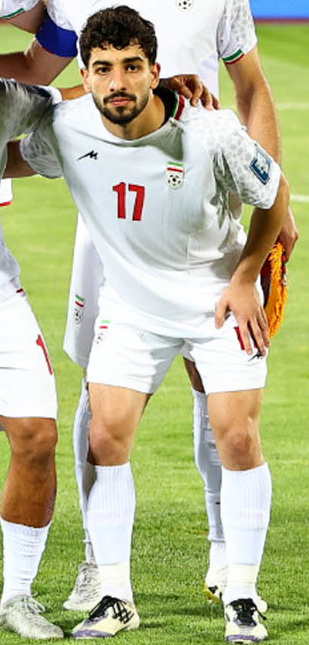

Personal information
- Full name: Mehdi hashemnejhad
- Date of birth: October 27, 2001 (age 25)
- Place of birth: Bandar-e Anzali, Iran
- Height: 1.77 m (5 ft 10 in)
- Position: Right winger

Team information
- Current team: Tractor
- Number: 20

Youth career
- –2017: Malavan

Senior career*
Years	Team	Apps	(Gls)
2017–2022	Malavan	58	(2)
2022	Naft M.I.S	11	(3)
2022–	Tractor	104	(14)

International career^{‡}
2021–2023	Iran U23	12	(0)
2022–	Iran	7	(0)
Medal record
Representing Iran
CAFA Nations Cup
Runner-up	2025 Tajikistan–Uzbekistan	Team
- * Club domestic league appearances and goals as of 26 February 2026 ‡ National team caps and goals as of 18 November 2025

Mehdi Hashemnejad (Persian: مهدی هاشم‌نژاد; born 27 October 2001) is an Iranian football midfielder who plays for Tractor in the Persian Gulf Pro League and the Iran national team.

== Career statistics ==
=== Club ===
As of 14 April 2026

Club	Season	League			Cup		Continental		Total	
Club	Season	League	Apps	Goals	Apps	Goals	Apps	Goals	Apps	Goals
Malavan	2017–18	Azadegan League	4	0	0	0	0	0	4	0
Malavan	2018–19	Azadegan League	12	0	0	0	0	0	12	0
Malavan	2019–20	Azadegan League	25	2	0	0	0	0	25	2
Malavan	2020–21	Azadegan League	17	0	5	1	0	0	22	1
Malavan	Total		58	2	5	1	0	0	63	3
Naft MIS	2021–22	Persian Gulf Pro League	11	3	0	0	0	0	11	3
Tractor	2022–23	Persian Gulf Pro League	26	1	1	0	0	0	27	1
Tractor	2023–24	Persian Gulf Pro League	27	2	3	1	1	1	31	4
Tractor	2024–25	Persian Gulf Pro League	29	8	1	0	8	2	38	10
Tractor	2025–26	Persian Gulf Pro League	22	3	1	0	9+1	2+0	33	5
Tractor	Total		104	14	6	1	18+1	5+0	129	20
Career Total			173	19	11	2	18+1	5+0	203	26

- other

=== International ===
As of match played on 18 November 2025

Appearances and goals by national team and year
National team	Year	Apps	Goals
Iran	2022	1	0
Iran	2025	6	0
Total		7	0

== Club career ==
=== Naft Masjed Soleyman ===
He made his debut for Naft Masjed Soleyman in the 19th fixtures of 2021–22 Persian Gulf Pro League against Foolad.

== Honours ==
Tractor

- Persian Gulf Pro League: 2024–25
- Iranian Super Cup: 2025
