= List of Foolad F.C. managers =

This is a list of all managers of Foolad.

== Coaches ==
Name	Nationality	From	To	P	W	D	L	GF	GA	Win%	Honours	Notes
Homayoun Shahrokhinejad	Iran	1996	1997	(n/a)	(n/a)	(n/a)	(n/a)	(n/a)	(n/a)	(n/a)		
Lefteh Sebaradaran	Iran	1997	1998	(n/a)	(n/a)	(n/a)	(n/a)	(n/a)	(n/a)	(n/a)		
Majid Bagherinia	Iran	1998	1999	(n/a)	(n/a)	(n/a)	(n/a)	(n/a)	(n/a)	(n/a)		
Vinko Begović	Croatia	1999	2003	(n/a)	(n/a)	(n/a)	(n/a)	(n/a)	(n/a)	(n/a)		
Luka Bonačić	Croatia	2003	2004	(n/a)	(n/a)	(n/a)	(n/a)	(n/a)	(n/a)	(n/a)		
Mladen Frančić	Croatia	2004	2006	(n/a)	(n/a)	(n/a)	(n/a)	(n/a)	(n/a)	(n/a)	1 Iran Pro League	
Nenad Nikolić	Croatia	2006	2006	(n/a)	(n/a)	(n/a)	(n/a)	(n/a)	(n/a)	(n/a)		
Mohammad Mayeli Kohan	Iran	2006	2007	(n/a)	(n/a)	(n/a)	(n/a)	(n/a)	(n/a)	(n/a)		
Abdollah Veisi	Iran	2007	2007	(n/a)	(n/a)	(n/a)	(n/a)	(n/a)	(n/a)	(n/a)		
Nenad Nikolić	Croatia	2007	2007	(n/a)	(n/a)	(n/a)	(n/a)	(n/a)	(n/a)	(n/a)		
Majid Jalali	Iran	2007	2007	(n/a)	(n/a)	(n/a)	(n/a)	(n/a)	(n/a)	(n/a)		
Augusto Inácio	Portugal	2007	2008	(n/a)	(n/a)	(n/a)	(n/a)	(n/a)	(n/a)	(n/a)	1 Azadegan League	
Guilherme Farinha	Portugal	2008	2008	(n/a)	(n/a)	(n/a)	(n/a)	(n/a)	(n/a)	(n/a)		
Majid Jalali	Iran	2008	2009	(n/a)	(n/a)	(n/a)	(n/a)	(n/a)	(n/a)	(n/a)		
Luka Bonačić	Croatia	2009	2009	(n/a)	(n/a)	(n/a)	(n/a)	(n/a)	(n/a)	(n/a)		
Majid Jalali	Iran	2009	2012	(n/a)	(n/a)	(n/a)	(n/a)	(n/a)	(n/a)	(n/a)		
Hossein Faraki	Iran	2012	2014	(n/a)	(n/a)	(n/a)	(n/a)	(n/a)	(n/a)	(n/a)	1 Iran Pro League	
Dragan Skočić	Croatia	2014	2016	(n/a)	(n/a)	(n/a)	(n/a)	(n/a)	(n/a)	(n/a)		
Naeim Saadavi	Iran	2016	2017	(n/a)	(n/a)	(n/a)	(n/a)	(n/a)	(n/a)	(n/a)		
Sirous Pourmousavi	Iran	2017	2018	(n/a)	(n/a)	(n/a)	(n/a)	(n/a)	(n/a)	(n/a)		
Ilie Stan	Romania	2018	2018	(n/a)	(n/a)	(n/a)	(n/a)	(n/a)	(n/a)	(n/a)		
Afshin Ghotbi	Iran	2018	2019	(n/a)	(n/a)	(n/a)	(n/a)	(n/a)	(n/a)	(n/a)		
Javad Nekounam	Iran	2019	2021	(n/a)	(n/a)	(n/a)	(n/a)	(n/a)	(n/a)	(n/a)	1 Hazfi Cup	
Abdollah Veisi	Iran	2021		(n/a)	(n/a)	(n/a)	(n/a)	(n/a)	(n/a)	(n/a)		

== See also ==
- Foolad F.C.
- Foolad F.C. players
