= Ali Derakhshan =

Iranian footballer

Personal information
- Date of birth: 17 February 1999 (age 27)
- Place of birth: bahmai County, Iran
- Height: 1.78 m (5 ft 10 in)
- Position: Left back

Team information
- Current team: Havadar
- Number: 15

Youth career
- 2017–2018: Esteghlal Ahvaz

Senior career*
Years	Team	Apps	(Gls)
2017–2018	Esteghlal Ahvaz	0	(0)
2020–2021	Fajr Sepasi	0	(0)
2021–2022	Havadar	3	(0)
- * Club domestic league appearances and goals

Ali Derakhshan (Persian: علی درخشان; born February 17, 1999) is an Iranian footballer who plays as a left back, currently playing for Iranian club Havadar in the Persian Gulf Pro League.

== Club career ==
=== Esteghlal Ahvaz ===
Derakhshan was part of Esteghlal Ahvaz from club date 2017 to 2018.

=== Fajr Sepasi ===
Ali Derakhshan joined Fajr Sepasi Football Club in 2020 and left the club in 2021 to join the Havadar team.
