= Reza Moghanloo =

Iranian footballer (born 1998)

Reza Moghanlou
Personal information
- Full name: Reza Moghanlou
- Date of birth: 13 March 1998 (age 28)
- Place of birth: Shahriar, Iran
- Position: Midfielder

Team information
- Current team: F.C. Pars Jonoubi Jam
- Number: 20

Youth career
- –2019: Naft Tehran
- Nirooye Zamini
- Esteghlal

Senior career*
| Years | Team | Apps | (Gls) |
| 2020–2022 | Havadar | 13 | (1) |
| 2022–2023 | Naft Masjed Soleyman F.C. | 11 | (1) |
| 2023 | Saipa F.C. | 15 | (1) |
| 2023–2024 | Sanat Naft Abadan F.C. | 19 | (0) |
| 2024– | F.C. Pars Jonoubi Jam | 0 | (0) |
- * Club domestic league appearances and goals as of 9 September 2025

Reza Moghanlou (Persian: رضا مغانلو; born 13 March 1998) is an Iranian professional footballer who plays as a midfielder for Pars Jonoubi Jam in the Azadegan League.

== Club career ==
In the summer of 2020, Moghanlou signed with Havadar and played three seasons, making 13 appearances and scoring once. He was part of the squad when Havadar won promotion to the Persian Gulf Pro League in the 2020–21 season.

=== Naft Masjed Soleyman ===
In early 2023, he joined Naft Masjed Soleyman for the second half of the 2022–23 Persian Gulf Pro League. He made 11 appearances and scored one goal. In an interview, Moghanlou mentioned his first-ever league goal came in a match against Malavan, but was mistakenly credited to another player by the commentator.
