= 2018–19 Azadegan League =

28th season of Azadegan League

Azadegan League
- Season: 2018–19
- Champions: Gol Gohar; 1st Azadegan League title
- Promoted: Gol Gohar; Shahin Bushehr
- Relegated: Shahrdari Mahshahr; Siah Jamegan; Naft Tehran
- Matches: 240
- Goals: 490 (2.04 per match)
- Top goalscorer: Peyman Ranjbari; Shahriyar Moghanlou (16 goals)
- Biggest home win: Sorkhpooshan Pakdasht 6–0 Navad Urmia (19 August 2018)
- Biggest away win: Qashqai 1–4 Mes Rafsanjan (12 August 2018)
- Highest scoring: Sorkhpooshan Pakdasht 6–0 Navad Urmia (19 August 2018); Mes Kerman 4–2 Baadraan (30 April 2019)

The 2018–19 Azadegan League was the 28th season of the Azadegan League and 18th as the second highest division since its establishment in 1991. The season featured 12 teams from the 2017–18 Azadegan League, two new teams relegated from the 2017–18 Persian Gulf Pro League: Siah Jamegan and Naft Tehran and two new teams promoted from the 2017–18 League 2: Karoon Arvand Khorramshahr and Shahin Bushehr both as champions. Navad Urmia replaced Gostaresh Foulad, while Sorkhpooshan Pakdasht replaced Esteghlal Jonoub. Oxin Alborz changed their name into Gol Reyhan. The league started on 10 August 2018 and ended on 30 April 2019. Gol Gohar won the Azadegan League title for the first time in their history. Gol Gohar and Shahin Bushehr promoted to the Persian Gulf Pro League. Peyman Ranjbari and Shahriyar Moghanlou were the league's top scorers, with 16 goals each.

== Teams ==
Before the start of competition Naft Tehran was relegated to League 2 following financial problems

=== Stadia and locations ===
Locations of clubs

Team	Location	Stadium	Capacity
Aluminium Arak	Arak	Imam Khomeini	15,000
Baadraan Tehran	Tehran	Kargaran	5,000
Fajr Sepasi	Shiraz	Hafezieh	15,000
Gol Gohar	Sirjan	Gol Gohar Sport Complex	3,200
Karun Arvand	Khorramshahr	Khorramshahr Stadium	15,000
Khooneh be Khooneh	Babol	Haft-e Tir	6,000
Malavan	Bandar-e Anzali	Takhti Anzali	8,000
Mes Kerman	Kerman	Shahid Bahonar	15,430
Mes Rafsanjan	Rafsanjan	Shohadaye Noushabad	5,000
Navad Urmia	Urmia	Shahid Bakeri	15,000
Gol Reyhan Alborz	Karaj	Enghelab	15,000
Qashqai	Shiraz	Hafezieh	15,000
Shahin Shahrdari	Bushehr	Shahid Beheshti	15,000
Shahrdari Mahshahr	Bandar-e Mahshahr	Shohada Mahshahr	3,000
Shahrdari Tabriz	Tabriz	Sahand	66,833
Sorkhpooshan Pakdasht	Pakdasht	Shahid Dastgerdi	8,250

=== Number of teams by region ===
	Region	Number of teams	Teams
1	Kerman	3	Gol Gohar, Mes Kerman, Mes Rafsanjan
2	Khuzestan	2	Shahrdari Mahshahr, Karun Arvand
3	Fars	2	Fajr Sepasi, Qashqai
4	Tehran	2	Baadraan, Sorkhpooshan
5	Alborz	1	Gol Reyhan Alborz
6	Bushehr	1	Shahin Bushehr
7	East Azerbaijan	1	Shahrdari Tabriz
8	Gilan	1	Malavan
9	Markazi	1	Aluminium Arak
10	Mazandaran	1	Khooneh be Khooneh
11	West Azerbaijan	1	Navad Urmia

=== Personnel and kits ===
Note: Flags indicate national team as has been defined under FIFA eligibility rules. Players may hold more than one non-FIFA nationality.

Team	Manager	Captain	Kit manufacturer
Aluminium Arak	(Iran) Faraz Kamalvand	(Iran) Hamed Basiri	(Iran) Yousef Jame
Baadraan	(Iran) Farhad Kazemi	(Iran) Karim Eslami	(Iran) Start
Fajr Sepasi	(Iran) Davoud Mahabadi	(Iran) Milad Safaei	(Iran) Olympic Sport
Gol Gohar	(Croatia) Vinko Begović	Various	(Iran) Yousef Jame
Gol Reyhan	(Iran) Mojtaba Hosseini		(Iran) Merooj
Karun Arvand	(Iran) Human Afazeli	(Iran) Mohsen Bengar	(Iran) Merooj
Khooneh Be Khooneh	(Iran) Akbar Misaghian	(Iran) Reza Nasehi	(Iran) Merooj
Malavan	(Iran) Mohammad Ahmadzadeh	(Iran) Pejman Nouri	(Iran) Merooj
Mes Kerman	(Iran) Farzad Hosseinkhani	(Iran) Farzad Hosseinkhani	(Iran) Merooj
Mes Rafsanjan	(Croatia) Mišo Krstičević	(Iran) Mohsen Varzkar	(Iran) Merooj
Navad Urmia	(Iran) Vahid Bayatloo	(Iran) Mohammad Zeynali	(Iran) Yousef Jame
Qashqai	(Iran) Mehdi Farvardin	(Iran) Hadi Khadem	(Iran) Olympic Sport
Shahin Bushehr	(Iran) Abdollah Veisi	(Iran) Milad Saremi	
Shahrdari Mahshahr	(Iran) Mehdi Pashazadeh	(Iran) Sajjad Ghanavati	(Iran) Nahangi
Shahrdari Tabriz	(Iran) Heydar Jafari	(Iran) Rasoul Pirzadeh	(Iran) Yousef Jame
Sorkhpooshan	(Iran) Mahmoud Fekri	(Iran) Amirhossein Feshangchi	(Iran) Yousef Jame

== League table ==
Pos	Team	Pld	W	D	L	GF	GA	GD	Pts	Promotion or relegation
1	Gol Gohar (C, P)	30	15	13	2	47	26	+21	58	Promotion to 2019–20 Persian Gulf Pro League
2	Shahin Bushehr (P)	30	14	12	4	34	17	+17	54	Promotion to 2019–20 Persian Gulf Pro League
3	Gol Reyhan Alborz	30	13	9	8	30	19	+11	48	
4	Aluminium Arak	30	12	12	6	27	23	+4	48	
5	Mes Kerman	30	12	11	7	38	22	+16	47	
6	Sorkhpooshan Pakdasht	30	11	10	9	48	38	+10	43	
7	Baadraan Tehran	30	11	10	9	35	32	+3	43	
8	Qashqai	30	11	7	12	28	34	−6	40	
9	Fajr Sepasi	30	9	11	10	26	24	+2	38	
10	Mes Rafsanjan	30	9	9	12	40	42	−2	36	
11	Malavan	30	10	11	9	29	28	+1	35 (Note: Malavan was deducted 6 points in issued by FIFA.)	
12	Khooneh be Khooneh	30	7	10	13	22	30	−8	31	
13	Navad Urmia	30	7	10	13	23	40	−17	31	
14	Sh. Tabriz	30	6	10	14	27	45	−18	28	
15	Karun Arvand Khorramshahr	30	6	10	14	17	36	−19	28	
16	Sh. Mahshahr (R)	30	5	10	15	19	34	−15	25	Relegation to 2019–20 2nd Division
17	Siah Jamegan (E)	0	0	0	0	0	0	0	0	Relegation to 2019–20 3rd Division
18	Naft Tehran (E)	0	0	0	0	0	0	0	0	Relegation to 2019–20 3rd Division

(C) Champions; (E) Eliminated; (P) Promoted; (R) Relegated
Notes:
- Naft Tehran and Siah Jamegan refused to attend 2 matches and relegated to 2 lower divisions.

== Results ==
Home \ Away	ALU	BAD	FJR	GOL	GRA	KAR	KBK	MLV	MES	MSR	NVD	QSH	SHN	SHM	SHT	SRP
Aluminium Arak		1–1	1–0	2–1	0–0	2–1	1–0	3–2	0–1	1–0	1–0	1–0	2–2	1–0	1–0	3–1
Baadraan Tehran	1–0		0–1	0–0	0–2	2–1	2–1	2–1	1–1	1–0	2–2	0–0	1–1	3–2	1–1	1–2
Fajr Sepasi	0–0	0–0		0–1	1–0	1–0	2–0	2–0	1–1	1–1	0–0	0–1	2–1	0–0	0–0	0–2
Gol Gohar	1–1	1–1	1–1		1–0	3–0	3–2	0–0	2–1	3–1	1–0	1–1	2–0	1–0	3–1	1–2
Gol Reyhan	1–1	1–0	1–0	0–1		2–0	1–0	3–1	1–0	1–1	1–0	1–2	1–2	4–1	2–1	2–0
Karun Arvand	0–0	2–1	1–0	0–0	0–2		0–1	0–0	1–3	0–1	1–0	1–0	0–3	0–0	0–0	0–0
Khooneh be Khooneh	1–1	3–2	0–0	1–1	1–1	3–0		0–3	1–0	2–2	0–0	1–0	0–0	0–0	2–0	0–1
Malavan	2–1	1–2	0–0	1–3	0–0	1–1	0–0		1–1	2–0	2–0	1–1	0–0	1–0	2–1	2–1
Mes Kerman	0–0	4–2	2–1	0–1	2–0	2–0	3–0	0–0		1–2	0–0	5–0	0–0	2–0	2–0	1–3
Mes Rafsanjan	4–1	1–0	4–3	4–1	1–1	2–2	1–0	0–1	0–1		2–3	2–0	1–1	1–1	0–3	3–3
Navad Urmia	1–0	0–3	2–2	0–4	0–0	3–1	0–2	1–3	0–0	1–0		2–1	1–1	1–1	4–1	1–0
Qashqai	0–0	1–0	0–2	3–3	0–0	1–0	2–0	0–1	0–1	1–4	2–0		0–1	2–1	4–2	2–1
Shahin Bushehr	0–0	0–2	1–0	1–1	1–0	1–1	1–0	2–0	2–1	3–0	2–0	2–0		0–0	3–0	1–2
Sh. Mahshahr	0–2	0–1	2–1	1–3	0–1	0–1	0–0	2–1	0–0	1–0	1–0	1–2	0–0		2–1	0–1
Sh. Tabriz	0–0	1–1	0–1	1–1	1–0	1–2	1–0	1–0	2–2	1–0	1–1	1–0	0–1	3–3		2–2
Sorkhpooshan	3–0	1–2	2–4	1–1	1–1	1–1	2–1	1–1	1–1	2–2	6–0	0–2	0–1	1–0	5–1	

Legend: Blue = home team win; Yellow = draw; Red = away team win.

== Statistics ==
=== Top scorers ===
Position	Player	Club	Goals
1	(Iran) Peyman Ranjbari	Gol Gohar	16
1	(Iran) Shahriyar Moghanlou	Malavan	16
3	(Iran) Akbar Saghiri	Mes Rafsanjan	14
4	(Iran) Farzad Mohammadi	Navad Urmia	10
5	(Iran) Mohammad Mehri	Qashqai	9
6	(Iran) Mehrdad Avakh	Gol Gohar	8
6	(Iran) Bahman Salari	Shahin Bushehr	8

== See also ==
- 2018–19 Persian Gulf Pro League
- 2018–19 League 2
- 2018–19 League 3
- 2018–19 Hazfi Cup
- 2018 Iranian Super Cup
