= Mohamad Lamenezhad =

Iranian footballer

Personal information
- Date of birth: 29 March 1989 (age 37)
- Place of birth: Ahvaz, Iran
- Height: 1.79 m (5 ft 10 in)
- Position: Defender

Youth career
- Sanat Naft

Senior career*
Years	Team	Apps	(Gls)
2011–2016	Sanat Naft	34	(6)
2016–2018	Arvand Khorramshahr	15	(1)
2018–2019	Foolad B	9	(0)
2019–2020	Arvand Khorramshahr	6	(0)
2020–2021	Iranjavan	1	(0)
2021	Sanat Naft	1	(0)
2021–2022	Esteghlal Khuzestan		
2022	Khalij Fars	0	(0)
- * Club domestic league appearances and goals

Mohamad Lamenezhad (Persian: محمد لامی نژاد; born 29 March 1989) is an Iranian former footballer.
