= Yasin Jorjani =

Iranian footballer

Personal information
- Full name: Yasin Jorjani
- Date of birth: 20 September 2003 (age 23)
- Place of birth: Golestan, Iran
- Height: 1.88 m (6 ft 2 in)
- Position: Centre-back

Team information
- Current team: Sepahan
- Number: 41

Youth career
- 2019–2020: Payam
- 2020–2021: Pars Ozhan Taban
- 2021–2022: Paykan
- 2022–2023: Saipa

Senior career*
Years	Team	Apps	(Gls)
2023–2025	Saipa	29	(1)
2025–2026	Aluminium Arak	19	(1)
2026–	Sepahan	2	(0)

International career
2024–	Iran U-23	0	(0)
- * Club domestic league appearances and goals as of 11 August 2026

Yasin Jorjani (Persian: یاسین جرجانی; born 20 September 2003) is an Iranian professional footballer who plays as a centre-back for Sepahan in the Persian Gulf Pro League.

== Club career ==
Jorjani began his youth career at Payam before moving to Pars Owjan Taban and then Paykan in 2021. In 2022, he joined Saipa's youth ranks and was promoted to the senior team in 2023, where he made 29 appearances and scored 1 goal over two seasons.

In 2025, Jorjani joined Aluminium Arak, making 19 appearances and scoring 1 goal in the Persian Gulf Pro League.

In 2026, he signed with Sepahan.

== International career ==
Jorjani has been called up to the Iran U-23 national team since 2024.

== Career statistics ==
As of 11 August 2026

Club	Division	Season	League		Hazfi Cup		Asia		Total	
Club	Division	Season	Apps	Goals	Apps	Goals	Apps	Goals	Apps	Goals
Saipa	Azadegan League	2023–24	12	0	0	0	–	–	12	0
Saipa	Azadegan League	2024–25	17	1	0	0	–	–	17	1
Aluminium Arak	Persian Gulf Pro League	2025–26	19	1	0	0	–	–	19	1
Sepahan	Persian Gulf Pro League	2026–27	0	0	0	0	–	–	0	0
Career total			48	2	0	0	–	–	48	2
