= Mojtaba Najjarian =

Iranian footballer (born 1998)

Personal information
- Date of birth: 25 January 1998 (age 28)
- Place of birth: Behbahan, Iran
- Height: 1.76 m (5 ft 9 in)
- Position: Right back

Team information
- Current team: Gol Gohar
- Number: 2

Youth career
- –2016: Foolad

Senior career*
Years	Team	Apps	(Gls)
2016–2025	Foolad	138	(2)
2025–	Gol Gohar	13	(0)

International career^{‡}
2016	Iran U20	5	(1)
2019–2020	Iran U23	4	(0)
- * Club domestic league appearances and goals as of 1 May 2025 ‡ National team caps and goals as of 15 January 2020

Mojtaba Najjarian (Persian: مجتبی نجاريان; born 25 January 1998) is an Iranian professional footballer who plays as a defender for Persian Gulf Pro League club Gol Gohar.

== Career statistics ==
=== Club ===
Club	Season	League			Cup		Continental		Other		Total	
Club	Season	League	Apps	Goals	Apps	Goals	Apps	Goals	Apps	Goals	Apps	Goals
Foolad	2016-17	Persian Gulf Pro League	7	0	0	0	0	0	0	0	7	0
Foolad	2017-18	Persian Gulf Pro League	5	0	1	0	0	0	0	0	6	0
Foolad	2018-19	Persian Gulf Pro League	4	0	2	0	0	0	0	0	6	0
Foolad	2019-20	Persian Gulf Pro League	16	1	0	0	0	0	0	0	16	1
Foolad	2020-21	Persian Gulf Pro League	16	0	3	0	5	0	0	0	24	0
Foolad	2021-22	Persian Gulf Pro League	23	0	2	0	3	0	1	0	29	0
Foolad	2022-23	Persian Gulf Pro League	16	0	0	0	0	0	0	0	16	0
Foolad	2023-24	Persian Gulf Pro League	27	1	0	0	0	0	0	0	27	1
Foolad	2024-25	Persian Gulf Pro League	17	0	1	0	0	0	0	0	18	0
Career Total			131	2	9	0	8	0	1	0	149	2
