= Farzin Moamelegari =

Iranian footballer

Personal information
- Full name: Farzin Moamelegari
- Date of birth: 14 January 2003 (age 23)
- Place of birth: Ramhormoz, Iran
- Height: 1.88 m (6 ft 2 in)
- Position: Left-back

Team information
- Current team: Malavan (on loan from Persepolis)
- Number: 8

Youth career
- Iman Sabz Shiraz

Senior career*
Years	Team	Apps	(Gls)
2023–2025	Sanat Naft Abadan	32	(0)
2025–2026	Shams Azar	27	(0)
2026–	Persepolis	5	(0)
2026–	→ Malavan (loan)	6	(0)

International career
2024–	Iran U-23	10	(0)
- * Club domestic league appearances and goals as of 21 September 2026

Farzin Moamelegari (Persian: فرزین معامله‌گری; born 14 January 2004 in Ramhormoz) is an Iranian professional footballer who plays as a left-back for Malavan in the Persian Gulf Pro League, on loan from Persepolis.

== Club career ==
=== Shams Azar ===
Before joining Shams Azar, Moamelegari had played for Sanat Naft Abadan. At Shams Azar Qazvin, he became one of the young players attracting attention in the transfer market and put in solid performances. Vahid Rezaei, Shams Azar's head coach, said that young players like Moamelegari had made good progress after five or six months of work.

=== Persepolis ===
Persepolis had been pursuing Moamelegari for several weeks, and after intensive negotiations, his transfer was finalized on 25 January 2026 (5 Bahman 1404). The transfer fee was reported at 40 billion tomans. He signed a two-and-a-half-year contract with Persepolis.

Shams Azar's head coach, Vahid Rezaei, was opposed to the player's departure, but expressed his consent due to the club's circumstances. Shams Azar's team manager also emphasized that the transfer was not related to the money owed for Mojtaba Fakhrian.

Moamelegari did not get much playing time at Persepolis, making a total of only five appearances for the club.

=== Malavan ===
Having become eligible for military service, the player joined Malavan Bandar Anzali on loan in August 2026 (Mordad 1405). His contract with Malavan runs until 30 June 2027.

== International career ==
Moamelegari has represented the Iran U-23 national team, earning 10 caps. He was part of the Iran U-23 squad at the AFC U-23 Asian Cup in Riyadh. In September 2026 (Shahrivar 1405), his name was included in the Iran U-23 squad for the 2026 Asian Games in Nagoya.

== Career statistics ==
As of 21 September 2026

Club	Division	Season	League		Hazfi Cup		Asia		Total	
Club	Division	Season	Apps	Goals	Apps	Goals	Apps	Goals	Apps	Goals
Sanat Naft Abadan	Persian Gulf Pro League	2023–24	34	3	0	0	–	–	34	3
Shams Azar	Persian Gulf Pro League	2024–25	29	1	0	0	–	–	29	1
Persepolis	Persian Gulf Pro League	2025–26	5	0	0	0	–	–	5	0
Malavan (loan)	Persian Gulf Pro League	2026–27	3	0	0	0	–	–	3	0
Career total			71	4	0	0	–	–	71	4
