= Alireza Alizadeh =

Iranian footballer

Personal information
- Date of birth: 11 February 1993 (age 33)
- Place of birth: Tehran, Iran
- Height: 1.82 m (6 ft 0 in)
- Position: Midfielder

Team information
- Current team: Gol Gohar Sirjan
- Number: 4

Youth career
- –2012: Moghavemat Tehran
- 2012–2014: Saipa

Senior career*
Years	Team	Apps	(Gls)
2013–2017	Saipa	23	(0)
2015–2016	→ Shahrdari Ardabil (loan)	25	(0)
2017–2018	Mes Kerman	27	(0)
2018–2020	Naft Masjed Soleyman	58	(2)
2020–	Gol Gohar	145	(5)

International career^{‡}
2023–	Iran	1	(0)
Medal record
Representing Iran
CAFA Nations Cup
Winner	2023 Kyrgyzstan – Uzbekistan	Team
- * Club domestic league appearances and goals as of 28 October 2023 ‡ National team caps and goals as of 16 June 2023

Alireza Alizadeh (Persian: علیرضا علی‌زاده born 11 February 1993) is an Iranian footballer who plays as a midfielder for Iranian club Gol Gohar Sirjan and the Iran national team.

== Club career ==
=== Saipa ===
Alizadeh began his career with Saipa, starting in the academy. In November 2013, he was promoted to the first team by head coach Engin Firat. Alizadeh made his debut for the club against Saba Qom in the final fixture of the 2013–14 season, entering as a substitute.

== International career ==
Alizadeh was invited to an Iran U23 preliminary camp by Nelo Vingada. He made his debut against Kyrgistan on 16 June 2023.

== Career statistics ==
As of 28 October 2023

Club	Season	League			Cup (Note: All appearances in the Iranian Hazfi Cup)		Continental		Other		Total	
Club	Season	Division	Apps	Goals	Apps	Goals	Apps	Goals	Apps	Goals	Apps	Goals
Saipa	2013–14	Persian Gulf Cup	1	0	0	0	—		—		1	0
Saipa	2014–15	Persian Gulf Pro League	10	0	2	0	0	0	0	0	12	0
Saipa	Total		11	0	2	0	0	0	0	0	13	0
Shahrdari Ardabil	2015–16	Azadegan League	25	0	0	0	0	0	0	0	25	0
Saipa	2016–17	Persian Gulf Pro League	12	0	0	0	0	0	0	0	12	0
Mes Kerman	2017–18	Azadegan League	24	0	0	0	0	0	0	0	24	0
Naft Masjed Soleyman	2018–19	Persian Gulf Pro League	29	0	1	0	0	0	0	0	30	0
Naft Masjed Soleyman	2019–20	Persian Gulf Pro League	29	2	3	0	0	0	0	0	32	2
Naft Masjed Soleyman	Total		58	2	4	0	0	0	0	0	62	2
Gol Gohar Sirjan	2020-21	Persian Gulf Pro League	27	1	3	0	0	0	0	0	30	1
Gol Gohar Sirjan	2021–22	Persian Gulf Pro League	24	0	1	0	0	0	0	0	25	0
Gol Gohar Sirjan	2022–23	Persian Gulf Pro League	23	1	1	0	0	0	0	0	24	1
Gol Gohar Sirjan	2023–24	Persian Gulf Pro League	25	2	4	0	0	0	0	0	29	2
Gol Gohar Sirjan	Total		99	4	9	0	0	0	0	0	108	4
Career total			229	6	15	0	0	0	0	0	244	6
