= Farzad Hosseinkhani =

Iranian footballer

Personal information
- Date of birth: 1 March 1981 (age 45)
- Place of birth: Kerman, Iran
- Height: 1.83 m (6 ft 0 in)
- Position: Midfielder

Team information
- Current team: Mes Kerman (manager)

Youth career
- 1994–1998: Mes Kerman

Senior career*
Years	Team	Apps	(Gls)
1998–2018	Mes Kerman	641	(14)

Managerial career
- 2019: Mes Kerman (caretaker)
- 2019–2020: Mes Kerman (assistant)
- 2020–2021: Mes Novin
- 2021–2023: Mes Kerman
- 2025–: Mes Kerman
- * Club domestic league appearances and goals

Farzad Hosseinkhani (Persian: فرزاد حسینخانی; born 1 March 1981) is an Iranian football coach and a former player who is the manager of Mes Kerman in the Azadegan League.

== Club career ==
Hosseinkhani has played for Mes Kerman since 1998.

=== Club career statistics ===
As of 22 June 2021

Club performance			League		Cup		Continental		Total	
Season	Club	League	Apps	Goals	Apps	Goals	Apps	Goals	Apps	Goals
Iran			League		Hazfi Cup		Asia		Total	
2006–07	Mes Kerman	Division 1	27	2			-	-	27	2
2007–08	Mes Kerman	Pro League	22	0			-	-	22	0
2008–09	Mes Kerman	Pro League	25	1			-	-	25	1
2009–10	Mes Kerman	Pro League	30	0			6	0	36	0
2010–11	Mes Kerman	Pro League	29	1	1	0	-	-	30	1
2011–12	Mes Kerman	Pro League	28	1			-	-	28	0
2012–13	Mes Kerman	Pro League	16	0	0	0	-	-	16	0
2013–14	Mes Kerman	Pro League	14	0	3	0	-	-	17	0
2014–15	Mes Kerman	Pro League	4	0	0	0	-	-	4	0
2014–15	Mes Kerman	Azadegan League	8	0	0	0	-	-	8	0
2015-16	Mes Kerman	Azadegan League	32	6	0	0	-	-	32	6
2016-17	Mes Kerman	Azadegan League	11	0	1	0	-	-	11	0
2017-18	Mes Kerman	Azadegan League	3	0	0	0	-	-	3	0
2018-19	Mes Kerman	Azadegan League	23	0	1	0	-	-	24	0
Career total			272	11	6	0	6	0	283	10
