= Peyman Ranjbari =

Iranian footballer

Personal information
- Date of birth: 21 August 1992 (age 34)
- Place of birth: Ardabil, Iran
- Height: 1.84 m (6 ft 0 in)
- Position: Forward

Team information
- Current team: Saipa
- Number: 9

Senior career*
Years	Team	Apps	(Gls)
2012–2013	Shahrdari Tabriz	3	(3)
2013–2014	Naft Gachsaran	20	(11)
2014	Gostaresh Foulad	8	(0)
2014–2015	Shahrdari Tabriz	11	(5)
2015–2016	Shahrdari Ardabil	35	(9)
2016–2017	Paykan	2	(0)
2017	Nassaji Mazandaran	3	(0)
2017–2018	Shahrdari Tabriz	22	(5)
2018–2021	Gol Gohar Sirjan	55	(15)
2021	Zob Ahan	14	(1)
2021–2022	Paykan	28	(3)
2022–2023	Naft Masjed Soleyman	27	(5)
2023–2024	Malavan	9	(1)
2024	Esteghlal Khuzestan	13	(1)
2024–2025	Havadar	15	(1)
2025–	Saipa	9	(1)
- * Club domestic league appearances and goals as of 22 April 2025

Peyman Ranjbari (Persian: پيمان رنجبري; born 21 August 1992) is an Iranian footballer who plays as a forward for Saipa in the Azadegan League.

== Club ==
Ranjabri started his professional career with Shahrdari Tabriz where he was promoted to the first team in summer 2013. He made his professional debut for Shahrdari Tabriz against Siah Jamegan on 15 February 2015.

== Club career statistics ==
As of 18 May 2015.

Club	Division	Season	League		Hazfi Cup		Asia		Total	
Club	Division	Season	Apps	Goals	Apps	Goals	Apps	Goals	Apps	Goals
Shahrdari Tabriz	Azadegan League	2012–13	3	3	0	0	–	–	3	3
Naft Gachsaran	Azadegan League	2013–14	23	13	0	0	–	–	23	13
Gostaresh Foulad	Pro League	2014–15	7	0	0	0	–	–	7	0
Shahrdari Tabriz	Azadegan League	2014–15	12	5	0	0	–	–	12	5
Shahrdari Ardabil	Azadegan League	2015–16	35	9	0	0	–	–	35	9
Paykan	Persian Gulf Pro League	2016-17	2	0	0	0	0	0	2	0
Shahrdari Tabriz	Azadegan League	2017-18	21	5	0	0	0	0	21	5
Gol Gohar	Azadegan League	2018-19	26	15	0	0	0	0	26	15
Gol Gohar	Persian Gulf Pro League	2019-20	20	0	0	0	0	0	20	0
Gol Gohar	Persian Gulf Pro League	2020-21	8	0	0	0	0	0	8	0
Gol Gohar	Total		54	15	0	0	0	0	54	15
Zob Ahan	Persian Gulf Pro League	2020-21	14	1	1	0	0	0	15	1
Paykan	Persian Gulf Pro League	2021-22	27	3	2	0	0	0	29	3
Naft MIS	Persian Gulf Pro League	2022-23	27	5	1	0	0	0	28	5
Malavan	Persian Gulf Pro League	2023-24	9	1	0	0	0	0	9	1
Esteghlal Kh	Persian Gulf Pro League	2023-24	5	1	0	0	0	0	5	1
Career totals			239	61	4	0	0	0	243	61
