= Mohammad Javad Rahimi =

Iranian footballer (born 1986)

Personal information
- Full name: Mohammad Javad Rahimi
- Date of birth: June 22, 1986 (age 40)
- Place of birth: Kordkuy, Iran
- Height: 1.84 m (6 ft 0 in)
- Position: Defender

Team information
- Current team: Management of Havadar S.C.

Senior career*
Years	Team	Apps	(Gls)
2001-2003	Shamoshak Kordkuy		
2003-2004	Esteghlal Tehran		
2004–2007	PAS Tehran F.C.		
2007-2008	Etka Tehran		
2008-2010	Etka Gorgan		
2010-2011	Sanat Mes Kerman		
2011-2012	Shahid Ghandi Yazd		
2012-2013	Etka Gorgan		
2013-2014	Alvand Hamedan		
2013-2014	Persepolis Shomal		
2014-2015	Etka Gorgan		
2015-2016	Pars Jonoubi Jam		
- * Club domestic league appearances and goals as of 28 April 2018

Mohammad Javad Rahimi (Persian: محمدجواد رحیمی; born June 22, 1986, in Kordkuy) is an Iranian footballer who plays as a defender.

== Club career ==
Rahimi has a history of playing in the Persian Gulf Pro League with the teams of Pas Tehran and Sanat Mes Kerman.

== Executive Background ==
- Management of Havadar football club
