= Yousef Mazraeh =

Iranian football player

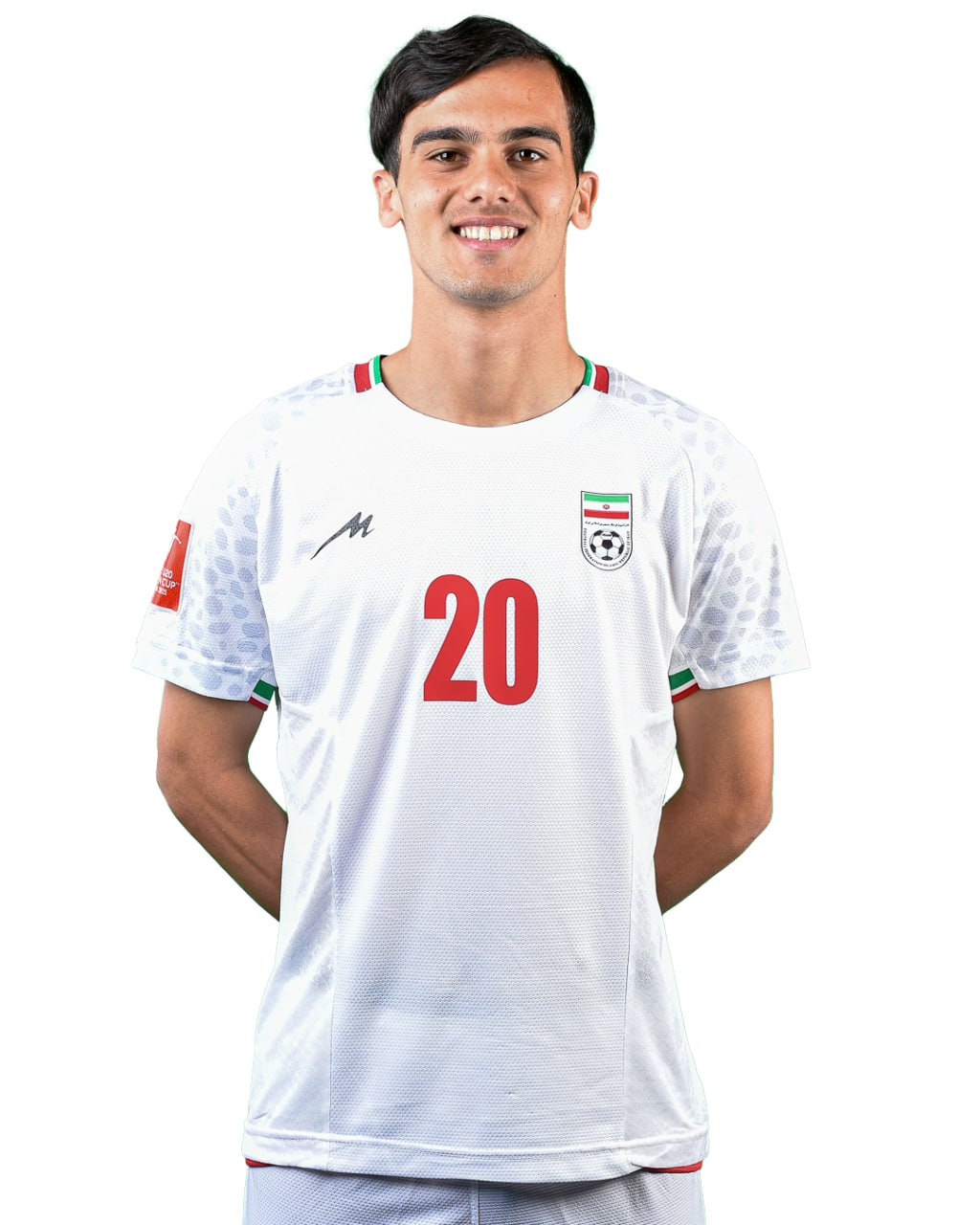

Personal information
- Full name: Yousef Mazraeh
- Date of birth: 13 June 2005 (age 21)
- Place of birth: Abu Homeyzeh, Iran
- Height: 1.78 m (5 ft 10 in)
- Position: Winger

Team information
- Current team: Foolad
- Number: 20

Youth career
- 2023–2025: Foolad

Senior career*
Years	Team	Apps	(Gls)
2025–	Foolad	28	(1)

International career
2024–	Iran U20	14	(4)
2026–	Iran U23	1	(1)
- * Club domestic league appearances and goals

Yousef Mazraeh, (Persian: یوسف مزرعه, born; 13 June 2005), is an Iranian football player who plays as a winger for Foolad in the Persian Gulf Pro League. He is also a member of the Iran national under-20 football team.

Mazraeh represented Iran in the 2025 AFC U-20 Asian Cup, appearing in four matches during the tournament. He scored a goal against Uzbekistan, and came on as a substitute during extra time in a crucial match against Japan.
