= Mohammad Erfan Masoumi =

Iranian footballer

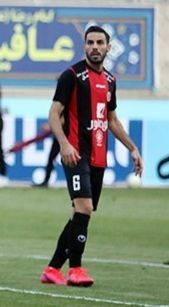

Personal information
- Full name: Mohammad Erfan Masoumi
- Date of birth: 26 March 1996 (age 30)
- Place of birth: Tehran, Iran
- Height: 1.85 m (6 ft 1 in)
- Position: Midfielder

Team information
- Current team: Gol Gohar
- Number: 6

Youth career
- 2015–2016: Paykan

Senior career*
Years	Team	Apps	(Gls)
2016–2018	Pars Jonoubi	8	(0)
2018–2020	Nassaji Mazandaran	19	(0)
2020–2021	Shahr Khodro	24	(0)
2021–2023	Fajr Sepasi	41	(3)
2023–	Zob Ahan	26	(1)
2024–2025	Havadar	30	(0)
2025–2026	Kheybar Khorramabad	23	(1)
2026–	Gol Gohar	7	(0)
- * Club domestic league appearances and goals as of 12 March 2024 @ 15:21(AEST)

Mohammad Erfan Masoumi (born 26 March 1996) is an Iranian footballer who plays as a midfielder for Gol Gohar in the Persian Gulf Pro League.
