= Karoon Arvand Khorramshahr F.C. =

Iranian football club

Karun Arvand Khorramshahr
- Full name: Karun Arvand Khorramshahr Football Club
- Founded: 2012; 13 years ago (as Karoon Khuzestan Football Club)
- Ground: Khorramshahr Stadium
- Capacity: 15,000
- Head Coach: Human Afazeli
- League: Azadegan League
- 2018–19: Azadegan League, 15th

Karun Arvand Khorramshahr Football Club is an Iranian professional football club based in Khorramshahr, Iran. They currently compete in the Iranian League 2.

== History ==
Karun Khuzestan Football Club was founded in Ahvaz in 2012. In 2016, the club's rights were sold and the team was now called Karun Arvand Khorramshahr Football Club, and was based in Khorramshahr and competed in the Iranian League 2. Arvand Free Zone became the club's main sponsor.

== Season-by-season ==
The table below shows the achievements of the club in various competitions.

Season	League	Position	Hazfi Cup	Notes
2016–17	League 2	5th/Group A	Round of 32	didn't qualify
