= Mojtaba Fakhrian =

Iranian footballer (born 2003)

Personal information
- Date of birth: 15 May 2003 (age 23)
- Place of birth: Buin Zahra, Iran
- Height: 1.77 m (5 ft 10 in)
- Positions: Forward; right winger

Team information
- Current team: Gol Gohar (on loan from Persepolis)
- Number: 7

Youth career
- –2016: Tohid Oghab
- 2016–2017: Paykan
- 2017–2020: Kia Academy
- 2020–2022: Paykan

Senior career*
Years	Team	Apps	(Gls)
2022–2023	Aluminium Arak	3	(0)
2023–2025	Shams Azar	40	(7)
2025–	Persepolis	1	(0)
2025–2026	→ Malavan (loan)	4	(1)
2026–	→ Gol Gohar (loan)	6	(2)

International career
2021	Iran U-20	9	(1)
2023	Iran U-23	1	(0)
- * Club domestic league appearances and goals as of 2 September 2026

Mojtaba Fakhrian (Persian: مجتبی فخریان; born 15 May 2003) is an Iranian professional footballer who plays as a forward for Gol Gohar in the Persian Gulf Pro League, on loan from Persepolis.

Fakhrian joined Persepolis on 17 May 2025.

== Club career ==
Fakhrian began his senior career with Aluminium Arak in 2022, making 3 appearances. He then joined Shams Azar in 2023, where he made 40 appearances and scored 7 goals over two seasons.

On 17 May 2025, Fakhrian signed with Persepolis. He was immediately loaned to Malavan for the 2025–26 season, making 4 appearances and scoring 1 goal.

In July 2026, Fakhrian was loaned to Gol Gohar for the 2026–27 season.

== International career ==
Fakhrian has represented Iran at the U-20 and U-23 levels, earning 9 caps for the U-20 team and 1 cap for the U-23 team.
