= Nenad Nikolić (footballer, born 1959) =

Croatian football coach (born 1959)

Personal information
- Date of birth: 7 January 1959 (age 67)
- Place of birth: Split, PR Croatia, FPR Yugoslavia
- Position: Defender

Senior career*
Years	Team	Apps	(Gls)
1982	GOŠK-Jug	6	(1)
1982–1983	Maribor	17	(0)
1984–1991	Primorac Stobreč		

Managerial career
- 1999: Foolad B
- 1999–2003: Foolad (assistant)
- 2006: Foolad
- 2007: Foolad
- 2007–2008: Iran U20
- 2008: Iran U23
- 2015–2016: Dunajská Streda (assistant)
- 2021: Yemen
- * Club domestic league appearances and goals

Nenad Nikolić (born 7 January 1959) is a Croatian football coach and former player who worked in Iran for more than a decade. He has worked in the Foolad academy since it began in 1999.

He was appointed head of the RNK Split Academy.
