= Kholmurod Nazarov =

Tajikistani professional football player

Personal information
- Full name: Kholmurod Nazarov
- Date of birth: 4 February 1994 (age 32)
- Place of birth: Tajikistan
- Height: 1.81 m (5 ft 11 in)
- Position: Defender

Team information
- Current team: Ravshan Kulob
- Number: 22

Senior career*
Years	Team	Apps	(Gls)
2016–2018	Khatlon	26	(0)
2019–2020	Kuktosh Rudaki		
2021	CSKA Pamir Dushanbe		
2021	Ravshan Kulob		
2021–2023	Kuktosh Rudaki		
2023–	Ravshan Kulob	19	(1)

International career^{‡}
2023–	Tajikistan	3	(0)
- * Club domestic league appearances and goals as of 11:15, 5 January 2024 (UTC) ‡ National team caps and goals as of 11:15, 5 January 2024 (UTC)

Kholmurod Nazarov (Tajik: Холмурод Назаров, born 4 February 1994) is a Tajikistani professional football player for Ravshan Kulob and the Tajikistan national team.

== Career ==
=== International ===
Khamrokulov made his senior team debut on 17 June 2023 against Uzbekistan, coming on as a 81st minute substitute for Ehson Panjshanbe.

Khamrokulov was named as part of the Tajikistan squad for the 2023 AFC Asian Cup.

== Career statistics ==
=== International ===
As of match played 17 October 2023

National team	Year	Apps	Goals
Tajikistan	2023	3	0
Total		3	0

== Honours ==
=== International ===
==== Tajikistan ====
- Merdeka Tournament: 2023
