= Mohammadamin Kazemian =

Iranian footballer (born 1996)

Mohammad Amin Kazemian
Personal information
- Full name: Mohammad Amin Kazemian
- Date of birth: 22 July 1996 (age 30)
- Place of birth: Kerman, Iran
- Height: 1.76 m (5 ft 9 in)
- Positions: Winger; forward

Team information
- Current team: Gol Gohar
- Number: 69

Youth career
- –2016: Mes Kerman

Senior career*
Years	Team	Apps	(Gls)
2016–2023	Mes Kerman	65	(8)
2019–2021	Mes Novin Kerman	32	(12)
2023	Zob Ahan	3	(0)
2023–2025	Aluminium Arak	49	(14)
2025–2026	Persepolis	16	(1)
2026–	Gol Gohar	6	(0)
- * Club domestic league appearances and goals as of 8 February 2026

Mohammad Amin Kazemian (Persian: محمدامین کاظمیان; born 22 July 1996) is an Iranian footballer who plays as a Forward for Gol Gohar in the Persian Gulf Pro League.

== Club career ==
=== Mes Kerman ===
He started football with his hometown team, Mes Kerman, and after playing for the reserve team, he was promoted to the premier league with the main team and was one of the main members of the team in the 2022–23 Persian Gulf Pro League.

== Career statistics ==
=== Club ===
As of 26 June 2026

Club	Season	League			Cup		Continental		Other		Total	
Club	Season	Division	Apps	Goals	Apps	Goals	Apps	Goals	Apps	Goals	Apps	Goals
Persepolis	2025–26	Pro League	16	1	1	0	–		1	1	18	2
Persepolis	Total		16	1	1	0	–		1	1	18	2
