= Mehdi Goudarzi =

Iranian footballer

Personal information
- Full name: Mehdi Goudarzi
- Date of birth: 9 December 2003 (age 22)
- Place of birth: Shiraz, Iran
- Position: Midfielder

Team information
- Current team: Gol Gohar
- Number: 11

Youth career
- 2020–2021: KIA
- 2021–2022: Saipa

Senior career*
Years	Team	Apps	(Gls)
2022	Saipa	3	(0)
2022–2023	Zob Ahan	2	(0)
2023–2025	Havadar	37	(1)
2025–2026	Kheybar Khorramabad	34	(0)
2026–	Gol Gohar	10	(1)

International career^{‡}
2022–2023	Iran U20		
- * Club domestic league appearances and goals as of 8 October 2024 ‡ National team caps and goals as of 1 July 2023

Mehdi Goudarzi (Persian: مهدی گودرزی, born 9 December 2003) is an Iranian footballer who plays as a midfielder for Iranian club Gol Gohar in the Persian Gulf Pro League.

== Club career ==
=== Early career ===
Goudarzi started his career as a youth player at KIA and then transferred to Saipa. In 2022, he signed for Iranian side Zob Ahan.

=== Havadar ===
He joined Havadar in September 2023. He made his debut on 28 October 2023 in the 8th match of the 2023–24 Persian Gulf Pro League season against Gol Gohar while he substituted in for Mohammad Chaharmahali.

== Personal life ==
On 16 January 2026, just before their match against South Korea in the 2026 AFC U-23 Asian Cup, Goudarzi, along with his entire team, refused to sing "Mehr-e Khavaran", the national anthem of the Islamic Republic of Iran, in solidarity with the 2025–2026 Iranian protests.

== Club career statistics ==
Last Update 8 October 2024

Appearances and goals by club, season and competition
Club	Season	League			cup		Continental		Total	
Club	Season	Division	Apps	Goals	Apps	Goals	Apps	Goals	Apps	Goals
Saipa	2021–22	Azadegan League	3	0	0	0	—		3	0
Zob Ahan	2022–23	Persian Gulf Pro League	2	0	0	0	—		2	0
Havadar	2023–24	Persian Gulf Pro League	20	0	1	0	—		21	0
Havadar	2024–25	Persian Gulf Pro League	7	1	0	0	—		7	1
Havadar	Total		27	1	1	0	—		28	1
Kheybar	2024–25	Persian Gulf Pro League	12	0						
Career total			32	1	1	0	0	0	33	1

== International career ==
=== Under–20 ===
In July 2022, He was invited to the Iran national under-20 football team by Samad Marfavi. In 2023, he was called up again to represent Iran youth national team.
