= Soheil Sahraei =

Iranian footballer (born 2003)

Personal information
- Date of birth: 29 May 2003 (age 23)
- Place of birth: Khomeyn, Iran
- Height: 1.87 m (6 ft 2 in)
- Positions: Centre-back; right-back

Team information
- Current team: Gol Gohar
- Number: 76

Youth career
- 2017–2018: Parsian
- 2018–2019: Foolad Talaeieh
- 2019–2020: Tohid Oghab
- 2020–2021: Batis
- 2021–2022: Tohid Oghab
- 2022–2023: Moghavemat Tehran
- 2023–2024: Persepolis

Senior career*
Years	Team	Apps	(Gls)
2024–2026	Persepolis	9	(0)
2026–	Gol Gohar	8	(0)

International career
2025–	Iran U-23	2	(0)
- * Club domestic league appearances and goals as of 23 January 2026

Soheil Sahraei (Persian: سهیل صحرایی; born 29 May 2003) is an Iranian professional footballer who plays for Gol Gohar in the Persian Gulf Pro League. He previously played for Gol Gohar.

== Club career ==
Sahraei joined the Persepolis Academy in 2023 and was promoted to the senior team in 2024. He made his debut for Persepolis during the 2024–25 season, appearing in 6 matches across all competitions. In the following season, he made 6 more appearances before leaving the club.

On 12 July 2026, Sahraei joined Gol Gohar on a free transfer.

== International career ==
Sahraei has been called up to the Iran U-23 national team and has earned 2 caps.

== Career statistics ==
As of 26 June 2026

Appearances and goals by club, season and competition
Club	Season	League			Hazfi Cup		Asia		Other		Total	
Club	Season	Division	Apps	Goals	Apps	Goals	Apps	Goals	Apps	Goals	Apps	Goals
Persepolis	2024–25	Persian Gulf Pro League	4	0	1	0	1	0	0	0	6	0
Persepolis	2025–26	Persian Gulf Pro League	5	0	0	0	–		1	0	6	0
Career total			9	0	1	0	1	0	1	0	12	0
