= Iran national under-23 football team =

National association football team

Iran under-23
- Nickname: Team Melli Omid (The Hope National Team)
- Association: FFIRI
- Confederation: AFC (Asia)
- Head coach: Yahya Golmohammadi
- Home stadium: Azadi Stadium
- FIFA code: IRN
First colours	Second colours

First international
- Iran 2–1 Kuwait (Kuwait City, Kuwait; 3 December 1977)

Biggest win
- Iran 10–0 Afghanistan (Busan, South Korea; 28 September 2002)

Biggest defeat
- Iran 2–6 Japan (Tehran, Iran; 9 February 2001)

AFC U-23 Championship
- Appearances: 5 (first in 2013)
- Best result: Quarter-finals (2016)

Asian Games
- Appearances: 7 (first in 2002)
- Best result: Gold Medal (2002)
Medal record
Asian Games
Gold medal – first place	2002 Busan	Team
Bronze medal – third place	2006 Doha	Team
WAFF U-23 Championship
Gold medal – first place	2015 Qatar	Team
Silver medal – second place	2023 Iraq	Team
West Asian Games
Gold medal – first place	1997 Tehran	Team
Silver medal – second place	2002 Kuwait City	Team
Bronze medal – third place	2005 Doha	Team

Iran national under-23 football team, also known as Iran U-23 or Iran Olympic Team; represents Iran in international football competitions in Olympic Games, Asian Games and AFC U-22 Asian Cup, as well as any other under-23 international football tournaments. It is controlled by the Iran Football Federation.

== History ==
The winner of the gold medal at the 2002 Asian Games, the team was prepared to defend its championship title at the football tournament of the 2006 Asian Games in Doha, Qatar. Despite a suspension by FIFA, preventing Iran to enter any international football competition, the Iran under-23 team was given special permission to participate in the Asian Games, where they won the bronze medal.

=== Wild cards ===
Football at the Asian Games has required that under-23 players enter the competitions, but they have allowed three over-age players can be included in the squad. Iran used three players, known as the "Wild cards", in three versions of the games in 2002, 2006, 2010 And 2022:

Competition	Wild card 1	Wild card 2	Wild card 3
2002 Asian Games	Ali Daei (C)	Yahya Golmohammadi	Ebrahim Mirzapour (GK)
2006 Asian Games	Hassan Roudbarian (C/GK)	Arash Borhani	Jalal Hosseini
2010 Asian Games	Mehdi Rahmati (C/GK)	Gholamreza Rezaei	Jalal Hosseini
2022 Asian Games	Hossein Hosseini (C/GK)	Amir Arsalan Motahari	

== Results and fixtures ==
Legend

Win Draw Loss Fixture

=== 2026 ===
3 January 2026 Friendly	Iran	1–0	China

7 January 2026 AFC U-23 Asian Cup GS	South Korea	0–0	Iran	Riyadh, Saudi Arabia
14:30 UTC+3		Report		Stadium: Al-Shabab Club Stadium; Attendance: 127; Referee: Ammar Mahfoodh (Bahrain)

10 January 2026 2026 AFC U-23 Asian Cup GS	Iran	0–0	Uzbekistan	Riyadh, Saudi Arabia
17:00		Report		Stadium: Prince Faisal bin Fahd Sports City Stadium; Attendance: 140; Referee: Abdullah Jamali (Kuwait)

13 January 2026 2026 AFC U-23 Asian Cup group stage	Iran	0–1	Lebanon	Riyadh, Saudi Arabia
14:30 UTC+3		Report	Shahin 56' (pen.)	Stadium: Al-Shabab Club Stadium; Attendance: 122; Referee: Faisal Al-Balawi (Saudi Arabia)

16 September Asian Games	United Arab Emirates	1–3	Iran	Kariya
14:00 UTC+9	Hunt 57'	Report	Shahrabadi 49'; Sosu 53' (o.g.); Mazraeh 88'	Stadium: Wave Stadium Kariya; Attendance: 671; Referee: Sadullo Gulmurodi (Tajikistan)

20 September Asian Games	Iran	0–0	China	Kariya, Japan
14:00 UTC+9		Report		Stadium: Wave Stadium Kariya

== Coaching staff ==
=== Current coaching staff ===
Position	Name
Head coach	(Iran) Yahya Golmohammadi
Assistant coaches	(Iran) Seyd Jalal Hosseini (Iran) Mustafa Sadaqat
Goalkeeping coach	(Iran) Ebrahim Mirzapour
Fitness coach	(Iran) Emad Mohajeri
analyzer	(Iran) Mohammad Asgari
Team Supervisor	(Iran) _
Physiotherapist	(Iran) _
Team doctor	(Iran) _
Media Manager	(Iran) _

=== Manager history ===
- (Iran) Heshmat Mohajerani (1977–1979)
- (Iran) Iraj Soleimani (1980–1982)
- (Iran) Mahmoud Yavari (1982–1984)
- (Iran) Iraj Soleimani (1984–1991)
- (Iran) Hassan Habibi (1991–1994)
- (Bosnia and Herzegovina) Enver Hadžiabdić (1994)
- (Germany) Hans-Jürgen Gede (1994–1995)
- (Iran) Hassan Habibi (1995)
- (Iran) Ebrahim Ghasempour (1997–1999)
- (Germany) Egon Coordes (1999)
- (Iran) Mehdi Monajati (1999–2002)
- (Croatia) Branko Ivanković (2002–2003)
- (Iran) Mohammad Mayeli Kohan (2003–2004)
- (Brazil) Renê Simões (2005–2006)
- (Croatia) Vinko Begović (2006–2007)
- (Croatia) Nenad Nikolić (2007–2008)
- (Iran) Gholam Hossein Peyrovani (2009–2010)
- (Iran) Human Afazeli (2010–2011)
- (Iran) Ali Reza Mansourian (2011–2014)
- (Iran) Human Afazeli (2014)
- (Portugal) Nelo Vingada (2014)
- (Iran) Mohammad Khakpour (2014–2016)
- (Iran) Amir Hossein Peiravani (2017)
- (Croatia) Zlatko Kranjčar (2018–2019)
- (Iran) Farhad Majidi (2019)
- (Iran) Hamid Estili (2019–2021)
- (Iran) Mehdi Mahdavikia (2021–2022)
- (Iran) Reza Enayati (2023)
- (Iran) Omid Ravankhah (2025–2026)
- (Iran) Hossein Abdi (2026)
- (Iran) Yahya Golmohammadi (2026–Present)

== Players ==
=== Current squad ===
==== 2026 Asian Games squad ====
The following 23 players were called up for the 2026 Asian Games.

No.	Pos.	Player	Date of birth (age)	Caps	Goals	Club
1	GK	Mohammad Khalifeh	19 August 2004 (aged 22)	10	0	(Football Federation Islamic Republic of Iran) Aluminium Arak
2	DF	Abolfazl Koohi	30 January 2005 (aged 21)	1	0	(Football Federation Islamic Republic of Iran) Nassaji
3	DF	Farzin Moamelegari	14 January 2004 (aged 22)	10	0	(Football Federation Islamic Republic of Iran) Malavan
4	DF	Danial Eiri	26 October 2003 (aged 22)	9	0	(Football Federation Islamic Republic of Iran) Persepolis
5	DF	Amin Hazbavi	6 May 2003 (aged 23)	9	1	(Football Federation Islamic Republic of Iran) Sepahan
6	MF	Mobin Dehghan	11 September 2005 (aged 21)	0	0	(United Arab Emirates Football Association) Al Wahda
7	FW	Esmaeil Gholizadeh	18 February 2006 (aged 20)	3	0	(Football Federation Islamic Republic of Iran) Esteghlal
8	MF	Amirmohammad Razzaghinia	11 April 2006 (aged 20)	9	2	(Football Federation Islamic Republic of Iran) Esteghlal
9	FW	Saeid Saharkhizan	26 June 2003 (aged 23)	7	4	(Football Federation Islamic Republic of Iran) Esteghlal
10	FW	Amirhossein Hosseinzadeh* (captain)	30 October 2000 (aged 25)	5	1	(Football Federation Islamic Republic of Iran) Tractor
11	FW	Kasra Taheri	6 August 2006 (aged 20)	4	6	(Football Federation Islamic Republic of Iran) Sepahan
12	GK	Adib Zarei	16 April 2003 (aged 23)	0	0	(Football Federation Islamic Republic of Iran) Shams Azar
13	DF	Soheil Sahraei	19 May 2003 (aged 23)	2	0	(Football Federation Islamic Republic of Iran) Gol Gohar
14	MF	Farhan Jafari	2 December 2005 (aged 20)	10	2	(Football Federation Islamic Republic of Iran) Malavan
15	DF	Masoud Mohebi	6 February 2005 (aged 21)	6	1	(Football Federation Islamic Republic of Iran) Kheybar
16	MF	Abbas Kahrizi	31 January 2005 (aged 21)	0	0	(Football Federation Islamic Republic of Iran) Aluminium Arak
17	FW	Reza Ghandipour	13 January 2006 (aged 20)	7	0	(United Arab Emirates Football Association) Shabab Al Ahli
18	MF	Pouria Latififar	16 August 2003 (aged 23)	7	0	(Football Federation Islamic Republic of Iran) Persepolis
19	DF	Yasin Jorjani	20 September 2003 (aged 23)	0	0	(Football Federation Islamic Republic of Iran) Sepahan
20	FW	Yousef Mazraeh	13 June 2005 (aged 21)	1	1	(Football Federation Islamic Republic of Iran) Foolad
21	FW	Pouria Shahrabadi	15 June 2006 (aged 20)	1	1	(Football Federation Islamic Republic of Iran) Persepolis
22	GK	Armin Abbasi	26 May 2006 (aged 20)	0	0	(Football Federation Islamic Republic of Iran) Paykan
23	MF	Ghasem Latifi	17 March 2004 (aged 22)	0	0	(Football Federation Islamic Republic of Iran) Foolad

* Over-aged player.

== Previous squads ==
AFC U-23 Asian Cup

- 2013 AFC U-23 Championship squad
- 2016 AFC U-23 Championship squad
- 2020 AFC U-23 Championship squad
- 2022 AFC U-23 Asian Cup squads
- 2026 AFC U-23 Asian Cup squads

Asian Games

- 2002 Asian Games Squad
- 2006 Asian Games Squad
- 2010 Asian Games Squad
- 2014 Asian Games Squad
- 2018 Asian Games Squad
- 2022 Asian Games Squad
- 2026 Asian Games Squad

== Honours ==
=== Continental ===
- Asian Games^{†}

(gold) Gold Medal (1): 2002
(bronze) Bronze Medal (1): 2006
4th place (1): 2010

^{†}U-23 teams were favoured by AFC and the IOC since 2002 Asian Games.The Senior team competed in the games before 2002.

=== Regional ===
- WAFF U-23 Championship

(gold) Winners (1): 2015
(silver) Runners-up (1): 2023

- West Asian Games

(gold) Champions (1): 1997.
(silver) Runners-up (1): 2002.
(bronze) 3rd place (1): 2005.

=== Other ===
- Semi-finalists in (Vietnam) 1999 Dunhill Cup
- 1st place in (Vietnam) 2006 VTV-T&T Cup (Spring Cup)
- 3rd place in 2008 Turkmenistan President's Cup
- 1st place in (Iran) 2010 Velayat Cup
- 2nd place in (Vietnam) 2010 Ho Chi Minh City Cup
- 1st place in (Qatar) 2013 International Friendship Youth Tournament
- 1st place in (Turkey) Antalya Tournament
- 3rd place in (Kyrgyzstan) 2025 Manas Cup

== Competitive Record ==
=== Olympic Games ===
Summer Olympic Games											Qualification							
Year	Result	Rank	M	W	D	L	GF	GA	GD	Squad	M	W	D	L	GF	GA	GD	Link
1908–1988	See Iran national team										See Iran national team							
(Spain) 1992	Did not qualify										8	5	2	1	19	6	+13	Link
(United States) 1996	Did not qualify										4	2	1	1	9	4	+5	Link
(Australia) 2000	Did not qualify										4	1	1	2	3	6	-3	Link
(Greece) 2004	Did not qualify										6	3	0	3	22	9	+13	Link
(China) 2008	Did not qualify										6	1	2	3	6	7	-1	Link
(United Kingdom) 2012	Did not qualify										4	1	1	2	1	5	-4	Link
(Brazil) 2016	Did not qualify										Via AFC U-23 Asian Cup							
(Japan) 2020	Did not qualify										Via AFC U-23 Asian Cup							
(France) 2024	Did not qualify										Via AFC U-23 Asian Cup							
(United States) 2028											Via AFC U-23 Asian Cup							
Total	—	0/9	–	–	–	–	–	–	–	–	32	13	7	12	53	36	+17	Link

=== AFC U-23 Asian Cup ===
AFC U-23 Asian Cup											Qualification							
Year	Result	Rank	M	W	D	L	GF	GA	GD	Squad	M	W	D	L	GF	GA	GD	Link
(Oman) 2014	Group Stage	9th	3	1	1	1	6	5	+1	Squad	5	4	1	0	13	2	+11	Link
(Qatar) 2016	Quarter-finals	6th	4	2	0	2	6	7	-1	Squad	4	3	0	1	15	2	+13	Link
(China) 2018	Did not qualify										2	1	0	1	2	3	-1	Link
(Thailand) 2020	Group stage	9th	3	1	1	1	3	3	0	Squad	3	2	1	0	6	1	+5	Link
(Uzbekistan) 2022	Group stage	12th	3	0	2	1	3	4	-1	Squad	3	3	0	0	9	2	+7	Link
(Qatar) 2024	Did not qualify										3	2	0	1	7	1	+6	Link
(Saudi Arabia) 2026	Group stage	14th	3	0	2	1	0	1	-1	Squad	3	3	0	0	13	2	+11	Link
(Japan) 2028	To be determined										To be determined							
Total	5/8		16	4	6	6	18	20	-2	—	23	18	2	3	65	13	+52	Link

=== Asian Games ===
Asian Games Record
Year	Result	Pld	W	D	L	GF	GA	Squad
1951 to 1998	See Iran national team							
(South Korea) 2002	Gold medal	6	4	2	0	16	2	Squad
(Qatar) 2006	Bronze medal	6	4	1	1	10	6	Squad
(China) 2010	Fourth place	7	5	0	2	14	8	Squad
(South Korea) 2014	Group stage	2	0	1	1	2	5	Squad
(Indonesia) 2018	Round of 16	4	1	1	2	3	4	Squad
(China) 2022	Quarter-finals	5	3	1	1	9	1	Squad
(Japan) 2026	Group stage	3	1	1	1	4	5	Squad
Total	7/7	33	18	7	8	58	31	—

=== WAFF U-23 Championship ===
WAFF U-23 Championship record
Year	Result	M	W	D	L	GF	GA
(Qatar) 2015	Champions	4	3	1	0	8	3
(Saudi Arabia) 2021	Not a WAFF member						
(Saudi Arabia) 2022	Not a WAFF member						
(Iraq) 2023	Runners-up (Note: Not a WAFF member, participated as invitee.)	4	1	3	0	5	3
Total	2/4	8	4	4	0	13	6

=== West Asian Games ===
West Asian Games record
Year	Result	M	W	D	L	GF	GA
(Iran) 1997	Champions	4	3	1	0	8	4
(Kuwait) 2002	Runners-up	4	1	3	0	5	4
(Qatar) 2005	Third place	4	3	1	0	10	2
Total	3/3	12	7	5	0	23	10

=== Islamic Solidarity Games ===
Islamic Solidarity Games record
Year	Result	M	W	D	L	GF	GA
(Saudi Arabia) 2005	See Iran B national team						
(Iran) 2010	Cancelled						
(Indonesia) 2013	Did not enter						
(Azerbaijan) 2017	Did not enter						
(Turkey) 2021	Group Stage (Note: Iran withdrew before the start of the tournament. However, all results were announced as 3–0 in favor of Iran's opponents.)	3	0	0	3	0	9
(Saudi Arabia) 2025	To be determined						
Total	1/4	3	0	0	3	0	9

== Head-to-head record ==
The following table shows Iran's head-to-head record in the AFC U-23 Asian Cup.

Opponent	Pld	W	D	L	GF	GA	GD	Win %
Australia	1	0	0	1	0	1	−1	0.00
China	2	2	0	0	4	2	+2	100.00
Japan	2	0	1	1	3	6	−3	0.00
Kuwait	1	1	0	0	3	1	+2	100.00
Lebanon	1	0	0	1	0	1	−1	0.00
Qatar	2	0	1	1	2	3	−1	0.00
South Korea	2	0	1	1	1	2	−1	0.00
Syria	1	1	0	0	2	0	+2	100.00
Turkmenistan	1	0	0	1	1	2	−1	0.00
Uzbekistan	3	0	3	0	2	2	+0	0.00
Total	16	4	6	6	18	20	−2	25.00

== See also ==
- Sport in Iran
  - Football in Iran
    - Women's football in Iran
- Iran national football team
- Iran national under-20 football team
- Iran national under-17 football team
- Iran national futsal team
- Iran national beach soccer team
- Iran women's national football team
