= Shahid Qasem Soleimani Stadium (Sirjan) =

Football stadium in Sirjan, Iran

Gol Gohar Sport Complex
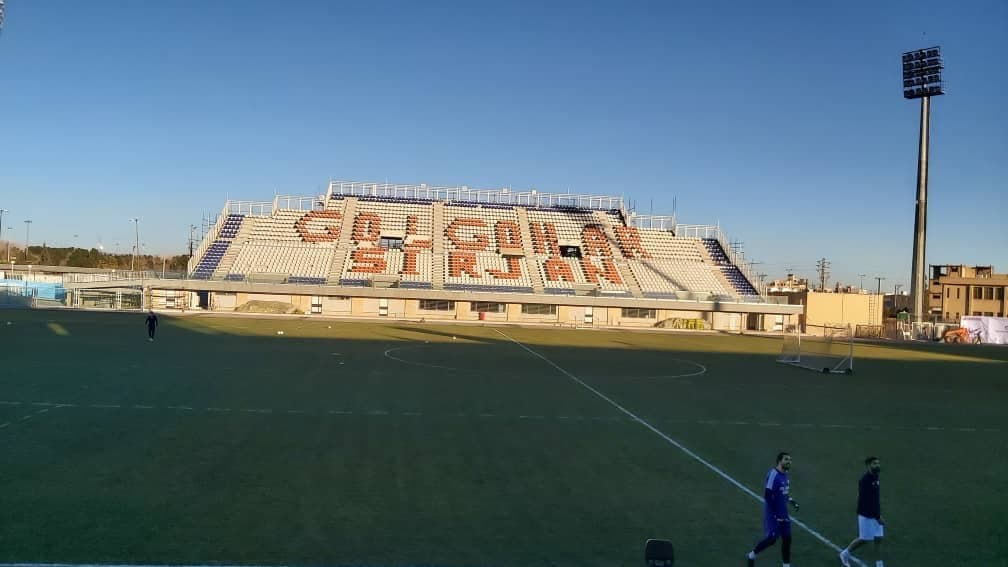
- Interactive map of Gol Gohar Sport Complex
- Full name: Gol Gohar Sport Complex
- Location: Sirjan, Iran
- Owner: Gol Gohar
- Operator: Gol Gohar
- Capacity: 8,000
- Field size: 105 m × 68 m (344 ft × 223 ft)

Construction
- Built: 2015
- Opened: 2015
- Expanded: 2019–2021

Tenant
- Gol Gohar (2015–present)

Website
- https://golgoharsport.ir/home

Gol Gohar Sport Complex (Shahid Soleimani Sport Complex) is the own sports complex of Gol Gohar Cultural and Sport Club based in Sirjan, Iran. The sports complex includes sports halls, an indoor swimming pool and a football stadium. The stadium is able to hold 8,000 people. It is the home venue of Gol Gohar Football Club.
