= Gol Gohar Sirjan F.C. =

Iranian football club

Gol Gohar گل‌گهر
- Full name: Gol Gohar Sirjan Football Club
- Nickname: Gol Haye Ziba (Beautiful flowers)
- Short name: Gol Gohar
- Founded: 1997; 29 years ago
- Ground: Gol Gohar Sport Complex; Sirjan, Iran
- Capacity: 9,000
- Chairman: Mohammad Esfandiarpour
- Head Coach: Mehdi Rahmati
- League: Persian Gulf Pro League
- 2025–26: Persian Gulf Pro League, 4th of 16
- Website: golgoharsport.ir
Home colours	Away colours	Third colours

Gol Gohar Sirjan Football Club (Persian: باشگاه فرهنگى ورزشى گل‌گهر سیرجان, Bashgah-e Futbal-e Gol Gohăr Sirjan) is an Iranian football club based in Sirjan, Iran. They currently compete in the Persian Gulf Pro League.

Gol Gohar Sirjan Football Club is the football team of the Gol Gohar Cultural Sports Club, which includes a successful basketball team that currently compete in the Iranian Basketball Super League. Gol Gohar is known for producing many academy players and promoting them to the first team.

== History ==
Gol Gohar Football Club was established by the Gol Gohar company in Sirjan in 1988 and competed in local leagues. In 1997, Gol Gohar Sirjan Sports Club was formally established with many divisions including the football team.

In 2007, Gol Gohar was promoted to the Azadegan League for the first time. In the 2018–19 season, they won the league and were promoted to the Persian Gulf Pro League.

== Players ==
As of 27 August 2026

Note: Flags indicate national team as defined under FIFA eligibility rules; some limited exceptions apply. Players may hold more than one non-FIFA nationality.

No.	Pos.	Nation	Player
1	GK	IRN	Farzin Garousian
2	DF	IRN	Mojtaba Najjarian
3	DF	IRN	Ehsan Hosseini
4	MF	IRN	Alireza Alizadeh (vice-captain)
5	DF	IRN	Milad Kor ^{U23}
6	MF	IRN	Mohammad Erfan Masoumi
7	FW	IRN	Mojtaba Fakhrian ^{U25} (on loan from Persepolis)
8	MF	IRN	Ali Asghar Ashouri (Captain)
9	MF	IRN	Omid Alishah
10	FW	IRN	Majid Aliyari
11	MF	IRN	Mehdi Goudarzi ^{U23}
13	MF	IRN	Mohammad Alinejad
14	DF	IRN	Amir Jafari ^{U25}
16	MF	IRN	Mohammad Reza Bordbar ^{U21}
18	MF	IRN	Alireza Ehsanifar ^{U23}

No.	Pos.	Nation	Player
19	DF	IRN	Pedram Ghazipour
21	FW	IRN	Parsa Kafafi ^{U21}
22	MF	IRN	Benyamin Alipour ^{U21}
26	DF	IRN	Masih Zahedi (vice-captain)
27	DF	IRN	Amirmehdi Khammar ^{U23}
31	GK	IRN	Mohammad Ali Shakiba ^{U23}
60	MF	IRN	Ahmad Reza Zendehrouh (vice-captain)
69	FW	IRN	Mohammad Amin Kazemian
70	FW	IRN	Ali Asghar Sheykholeslami ^{U23}
76	DF	IRN	Soheil Sahraei ^{U23}
77	MF	IRN	Amir Mohammad Rezaei ^{U21}
88	MF	IRN	Siamak Nemati
97	GK	IRN	Mohammad Reza Akhbari
99	MF	TUN	Louay Ben Hassine

=== Reserve Squad ===
Note: Flags indicate national team as defined under FIFA eligibility rules; some limited exceptions apply. Players may hold more than one non-FIFA nationality.

No.	Pos.	Nation	Player
17	DF	IRN	Amir Mohammad Badavar ^{U21}
20	FW	IRN	Mohammad Reza Abbasi ^{U19}
29	FW	IRN	Mohammad Amin Hamidi ^{U19}
30	FW	IRN	Amir Reza Valipour ^{U19}

No.	Pos.	Nation	Player
32	DF	IRN	Amir Mahan Afrouziani ^{U19}
55	DF	IRN	Ali Hassani ^{U21}
80	MF	IRN	Mohammad Hossein Jamali ^{U19}
87	GK	IRN	Soroush Yarandi ^{U19}

=== Out on loan ===
Note: Flags indicate national team as defined under FIFA eligibility rules; some limited exceptions apply. Players may hold more than one non-FIFA nationality.

No.	Pos.	Nation	Player
—	DF	IRN	Hossein Emadabadi ^{U21} (at Nirooye Zamini)

== Current managerial staff ==
Position	Staff
Head coach	(Iran) Mehdi Rahmati
Assistant coaches	(Albania) Bledar Kola (Iran) Hadi Aghili
Goalkeeping coach	(Greece) Mario Demetrius
Fitness coach	(Greece) Stavros Pantelidis
Training coaches	(Iran) Hamzeh Mozafari (Iran) Moharram Fathi
Analyst	(Iran) Hamidreza Elahi
Team manager	(Iran) Heydar Afsari

== Former managers ==
- (Iran) Ghasem Shahba (2005 - 2010)
- (Iran) Hamid Reza Kololifard (2010)
- (Iran) Farshad Pious (2010 - 2012)
- (Iran) Mehdi Mohammadi (2012)
- (Iran) Ghasem Shahba (Jun 2012 - Nov 2015)
- (Armenia) Armen Gyulbudaghyants (Nov 2015 - May 2016)
- (Croatia) Vinko Begović (Jul 2016 - Oct 2019)
- (Iran) Amir Ghalenoei (Sep 2020 - March 2023)
- (Iran) Saeed Alhoei (March 2023 - May 2023)
- (Greece) Marinos Ouzounidis (June 2023 - 2024)

== Season-by-season ==
The table below chronicles the achievements of Gol Gohar in various competitions since 2005.

Season	League	Position	Hazfi Cup	Notes
2005–06	3rd Division	1st	Did not qualify	Promoted
2006–07	2nd Division	2nd	First round	Promoted
2007–08	Azadegan League	5th	First round
2008–09	Azadegan League	5th	First round
2009–10	Azadegan League	10th	Third round
2010–11	Azadegan League	7th	Second round
2011–12	Azadegan League	9th	Third round
2012–13	Azadegan League	5th	Withdrew
2013–14	Azadegan League	7th	Fourth round
2014–15	Azadegan League	7th	Quarter-Final
2015–16	Azadegan League	11th	Withdrew
2016–17	Azadegan League	3rd	Withdrew
2017–18	Azadegan League	7th	Withdrew
2018-19	Azadegan League	1st	Withdrew	Promoted
2019–20	Persian Gulf League	10th	Round of 32
2020–21	Persian Gulf League	5th	Semi-Finals
2021-22	Persian Gulf League	4th	Round of 16
2022–23	Persian Gulf League	6th	Quarter-Final
2023–24	Persian Gulf League	9th	Semi-Final
2024–25	Persian Gulf League	5th	Semi-Final
2025–26	Persian Gulf League	4th

== Honours ==
- Azadegan League
  - Winners: 2018–19
- league 2 (Iran)
  - Runner-up: 2006–07
- League 3 (Iran)
  - Winners: 2005–06
