= Havadar S.C. =

Iranian association football club

Havadar هوادار
- Full name: Havadar Sport club
- Short name: Havadar
- Founded: 2018; 8 years ago (as Persepolis Pakdasht Football Club) 2020; 6 years ago (as Havadar)
- Stadium: Shahid Dastgerdi
- Capacity: 8,250
- Owner: Hirkania Technology Development Investment Company
- Chairman: Mohammad Javad Rahimi
- Head Coach: Mehrdad Tahmasebi
- League: Azadegan League
- 2024–25: Persian Gulf Pro League, 16th (relegated)
Home colours	Away colours	Third colours

Havadar Sport Club (Persian: باشگاه ورزشی هوادار, Bashgah-e Vârzeshi-ye Havadar-e)commonly known as Havadar, is an Iranian football club based in Eslamshahr and the capital Tehran that competes in the Persian Gulf Pro League. The club was founded in 2018 as Sorkhpooshan Pakdasht Football Club (Persian: باشگاه فوتبال سرخپوشان پاکدشت).

The football team plays its home games at the Shohadaye Eslamshahr Stadium which has a seating capacity of 7,000. The club also uses the Ghadir Tehran Stadium, with a seating capacity of 2,500. The club is owned and supported by former professional football player Reza Enayati.

== History ==
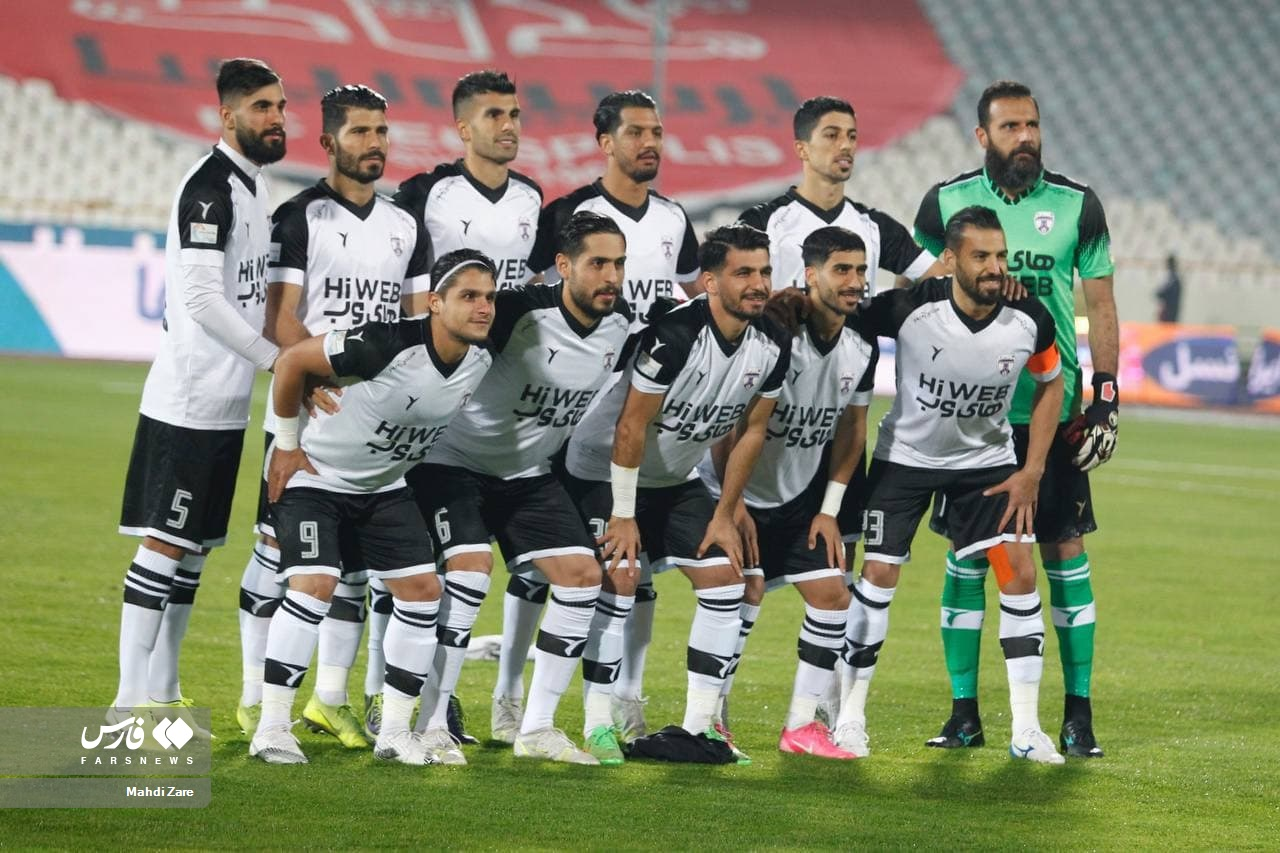
Havadar against Persepolis in 2021

The team entered the Azadegan League with the purchase of the team of South Tehran's independence team in the 2018–19 season with the coach of Farhad Kazemi. With the decision of the board, the name of the team changed before the start of the 2018–19 Azadegan League from Persepolis Pakdasht to the Sorkhpooshan Pakdasht.

The Sorkhpooshan Pakdasht club will be in the first league in the season of 2018–19, the first team was established under the name Persepolis Pakdasht.

While the Sorkhpooshan Pakdasht club was to be purchased from the Qashqai Club of Shiraz, the Ismael Sarhangian, owner of the Esteghlal E Jonoub of Tehran, announced the sale of a league's licence to the Sorkhpooshan Pakdasht.

Sorkhpooshan Pakdasht is anonymous and uninformed team that few people know about the terms of the club. Leading the Pakistani Paleolithic Club is Farhad Kazemi, the former president of the Tehran Rah Ahan and Pas Club.

== Players ==
Note: Flags indicate national team as defined under FIFA eligibility rules; some limited exceptions apply. Players may hold more than one non-FIFA nationality.

No.	Pos.	Nation	Player
4	DF	IRI	Abolfazl Alaei
6	DF	IRI	Saeb Mohebi
7	MF	IRI	Mostafa Ahmadi
8	MF	IRI	Mohammad Erfan Masoumi
9	FW	IRI	Peyman Ranjbari
11	MF	IRI	Dariush Shojaeian
13	DF	IRI	Mehdi Mahdavi
14	DF	IRI	Kasra Rahmati
16	FW	IRI	Amirhossein Bahador
19	MF	IRI	Ali Fathi
20	FW	IRI	Mehdi Tahmasebi
21	MF	IRI	Mohammad hossein Zavari
22	GK	IRI	Mohammad Javad Kia
28	DF	IRI	Danial Mahini
30	FW	IRI	Mehdi Daryabari
33	DF	IRI	Meysam Tohidast
37	DF	IRI	Morteza Mansouri

No.	Pos.	Nation	Player
40	DF	IRI	Erfan Heydari
44	DF	IRI	Mohammad Sattari
45	FW	IRI	Saeed Sadeghi
47	FW	IRI	Afshin Sadeghnejad
64	MF	IRI	Mostafa Sheykh
66	DF	IRI	Milad Khodaei Asl
70	MF	IRI	Adnan As'adi
72	DF	IRI	Amirmohammad Alishah
75	GK	IRI	Hossein Mehraban
77	FW	IRI	Mehdi Torkaman
79	DF	IRI	Reza Soltani
80	MF	IRI	Edris Rahmani
88	MF	IRI	Mehdi Goudarzi
90	GK	IRI	Hossein Akbar Monadi
97	GK	IRI	Reza Jafari Sorkhe
98	FW	IRI	Mohammad Dindar

For recent transfers, see List of Iranian football transfers summer 2024.

== Managers ==
Position	Name
Manager	Mehrdad Tahmasebi
Assistant coaches	Javad Manafi Roozbeh Madadi
Goalkeeper coach	
Analysis coaches	
Fitness Coach	
Media Manager	
