= 2020–21 Persepolis F.C. season =

Persepolis
2020–21 season
- Chairman: Mehdi Rasoul Panah (Until 23 October); Jafar Samiei (From November)
- Manager: Yahya Golmohammadi
- Stadium: Azadi Stadium
- Persian Gulf Pro League: Winners
- Hazfi Cup: Quarter Finals
- Iranian Super Cup: Winners
- 2020 AFC Champions League: Runners-up
- 2021 AFC Champions League: Group stage (continues to next season)
- Top goalscorer: League: Ahmad Nourollahi (10); All: Mehdi Abdi (14)
- Biggest win: 0–5 vs Gol Gohar; 0–5 vs Machine Sazi
- Biggest defeat: 0–1 vs Al-Duhail; 1–2 vs Ulsan Hyundai; 2–1 vs Aluminium Arak
Home colours	Away colours	Third colours

The 2020–21 season is the Persepolis's 20th season in the Pro League, and their 38th consecutive season in the top division of Iranian Football. They are also competing in the Hazfi Cup, Super Cup and AFC Champions League.

== Squad ==
=== First team squad ===
No.	Name	Age	Nationality	Position (s)	Since	App	Goals	Assist	Ends	Signed from	Transfer fee	Notes
Goalkeepers
34	Amir Mohammad Yousefi	20	(Iran)	GK	2020	0	0	0	2023	Academy	Free	U-21
44	Božidar Radošević	31	(Croatia)	GK	2016	41	0	0	2023	(Hungary) Debreceni	Free	
81	Hamed Lak	30	(Iran)	GK	2020	43	0	0	2022	Machine Sazi	Free	
Defenders
3	Farshad Faraji	26	(Iran)	CB / RB	2021	11	0	0	2023	Padideh	Free	
4	Jalal Hosseini	38	(Iran)	CB / RB	2016	166	6	4	2022	Naft Tehran	Free	Captain
6	Hossein Kanaanizadegan	26	(Iran)	CB / RB / LB	2013	33	1	0	2021	Machine Sazi	Free	
17	Mehdi Shiri	29	(Iran)	RB / RM / RW / DM	2018	85	1	3	2021	Paykan	Free	
77	Saeid Aghaei	25	(Iran)	LB / LM / LW	2020	33	0	4	2022	Sepahan	Free	
51	Amir Mohammad Kharkesh	17	(Iran)	CB / LB	2020	0	0	0	2023	Academy	Free	U-21
Midfielders
2	Omid Alishah	28	(Iran)	LM / RM / LW / RW / SS	2013	185	19	26	2021	Rah Ahan	Free	Vice Captain
8	Ahmad Nourollahi	27	(Iran)	DM / CM / RM / LM	2014	207	21	10	2022	Foolad Yazd	Free	3rd Captain
10	Milad Sarlak	25	(Iran)	DM / CM	2020	43	2	1	2022	Padideh	Free	
11	Kamal Kamyabinia	31	(Iran)	DM / CM / RM / LM	2015	186	20	4	2022	Naft Tehran	Free	
14	Ehsan Pahlavan	27	(Iran)	LM / RM / AM / CM / SS	2020	42	1	2	2022	Zob Ahan	Free	
18	Mohammad Sharifi	20	(Iran)	CM / DM / AM	2020	8	0	0	2022	Saipa	Free	U-21
19	Vahid Amiri	32	(Iran)	LM / RM / LW / RW / SS / CF	2016	151	20	22	2021	(Turkey) Trabzonspor	Free	
21	Mehdi Torabi	26	(Iran)	LM / RM / LW / RW / AM	2018	77	22	13	2023	(Qatar) Al Arabi	Free	
23	Ali Shojaei	23	(Iran)	LM / LB / AM / SS	2020	19	0	1	2022	Nassaji	Free	
88	Siamak Nemati	26	(Iran)	RM / RB / LM / AM	2017	133	12	6	2023	Paykan	Free	
Forwards
72	Issa Alekasir	30	(Iran)	CF / SS	2020	26	10	0	2022	Sanat Naft Abadan	Free	
9	Mehdi Mehdikhani	23	(Iran)	CF / SS / RW / LW	2020	18	0	0	2022	(Croatia) Varaždin	Free	
16	Mehdi Abdi	22	(Iran)	CF / SS	2017	56	18	0	2025	Academy	Free	U-23
25	Alireza Khodaei	18	(Iran)	CF	2020	1	0	0	2023	Academy	Free	U-21
70	Shahriyar Moghanlou	26	(Iran)	CF	2021	21	8	1	2021	(Portugal) Santa Clara	Free	
Players left the club during the season
20	Amir Roostaei	23	(Iran)	CF / LW / RW	2019	6	0	0	2024	Loan to Paykan		
5	Bashar Resan	24	(Iraq)	AM / RM / LM / CM	2017	92	4	7	2020	Transfer to Qatar SC		
26	Saeid Hosseinpour	22	(Iran)	AM / CM / DM	2017	11	0	0	2022	Loan to Machine Sazi		
36	Arman Ramezani	28	(Iran)	CF / SS	2020	5	0	1	2022	Released		
33	Sina Mahdavi	21	(Iran)	LB	2020	0	0	0	2023	Loan to Malavan		
25	Aria Barzegar	18	(Iran)	CF / SS	2019	0	0	0	2022	Loan to Fajr Sepasi		
38	Ehsan Hosseini	22	(Iran)	CB / DM	2017	6	0	0	2023	Loan to Padideh		
15	Mohammad Ansari	29	(Iran)	LB / CB / DM	2015	108	3	3	2021	Transfer to Mes Rafsanjan		
99	Alireza Maleki	21	(Iran)	CF	2020	0	0	0	2022	Transfer to Spad		

== New Contracts ==
No	P	Name	Age	Contract length	Contract ends	Source
5	MF	Bashar Resan	23	1 season	2021	
20	FW	Amir Roostaei	23	2 season	2024	
16	FW	Mehdi Abdi	21	3 season	2025	
88	DF	Siamak Nemati	26	2 season	2023	
11	MF	Kamal Kamyabinia	31	1 season	2022	

== Transfers ==
=== In ===
No	P	Name	Age	Moving from	Ends	Transfer fee	Type	Transfer window	Quota	Source
34	GK	Amir Mohammad Yousefi	20	Academy		Free	Promoted	Summer		
77	LB	Saeid Aghaei	25	Sepahan		Free	Transfer	Summer		
81	GK	Hamed Lak	29	Machine Sazi		Free	Transfer	Summer		
72	CF	Issa Alekasir	30	Sanat Naft Abadan		Free	Transfer	Summer		
14	MF	Ehsan Pahlevan	27	Zob Ahan		Free	Transfer	Summer		
10	MF	Milad Sarlak	25	Padideh		Free	Transfer	Summer		
23	LM	Ali Shojaei	23	Nassaji		Free	Transfer	Summer		
36	CF	Arman Ramezani	28	Saipa		Free	Transfer	Summer		
51	CB	Amir Mohammad Kharkesh	18	Academy		Free	Promoted	Summer		
18	MF	Mohammad Sharifi	20	Saipa		Free	Transfer	Summer		
9	RM	Mehdi Mehdikhani	23	(Croatia) Varaždin		$50,000	Transfer	Summer		
99	CF	Alireza Maleki	22	Academy		Free	Promoted	Winter(During First Half Season)		
21	RM	Mehdi Torabi	26	(Qatar) Al Arabi		Free	Transfer	Winter		
70	CF	Shahriyar Moghanlou	26	(Portugal) Santa Clara		€50,000	Loan	Winter		
3	CB	Farshad Faraji	26	Padideh			Transfer	Winter		
25	CF	Alireza Khodaei	19	Academy		Free	Promoted	Winter		
80	RW	Mohammad Omri	18	Academy		Free	Promoted	Winter		

=== Out ===
No	P	Name	Age	Moving to	Transfer fee	Type	Transfer window	Source
1	GK	Alireza Beiranvand	27	(Belgium) Antwerp	€600,000	Transfer	Summer	
32	CF	(Republic of Ireland) Anthony Stokes	32	(Scotland) Livingston	Free	Transfer	Summer	
9	RM	Mehdi Torabi	25	(Qatar) Al-Arabi		Transfer	Summer	
22	GK	Sasan Zamaneh	21	Demote To Youth Team			Summer	
99	CF	(Nigeria) Christian Osaguona	29	(Iraq) Al-Shorta	Free	Transfer	Summer	
70	CF	Ali Alipour	25	(Portugal) Maritimo	Free	Transfer	Summer	
63	GK	Amirhossein Bayat	22	Esteghlal	Free	Transfer	Summer	
80	AM	Mohammad Hosseini	21	Nirooye Zamini	Free	Loan	Summer	
18	DM	Mohsen Rabiekhah	32	Aluminium Arak	Free	Transfer	Summer	
3	CB	Shojae Khalilzadeh	31	(Qatar) Al-Rayyan	Free	Transfer	Summer	
28	LB	Mohammad Naderi	24	(Belgium) Kortrijk	Free	Loan Return	Summer	
20	ST	Amir Roostaei	23	Paykan	Free	Loan	Summer	
5	AM	(Iraq) Bashar Resan	23	Qatar SC	$120,000	Transfer	Winter(During First Half Season)	
26	AM	Saeid Hosseinpour	22	Machine Sazi	Free	Loan	Winter	
36	FW	Arman Ramezani	28	Esteghlal	Free	Transfer	Winter	
33	LB	Sina Mahdavi	21	Malavan	Free	Loan	Winter	
25	ST	Aria Barzegar	18	Fajr Sepasi	Free	Loan	Winter	
38	CB	Ehsan Hosseini	22	Padideh	Free	Loan	Winter	
15	DF	Mohammad Ansari	29	Mes Rafsanjan	Free	Transfer	Winter	
28	CF	Alireza Maleki	22	Spad	Free	Transfer	Winter(During Second Half Season)	

== Technical staff ==
Persepolis Head coach in 2020–21 Persian Gulf Pro League
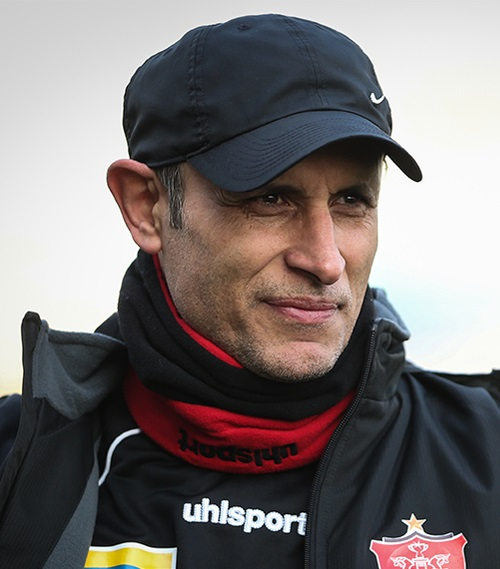

Position	Staff
Head coach	(Iran) Yahya Golmohammadi
Assistant coach	(Iran) Hamid Motahari
First-team coach	(Iran) Karim Bagheri
Goalkeeping coach	(Iran) Davoud Fanaei
Physical fitness trainer	(Iran) Dr. Mazaher Rahimpour
Analyzer	(Iran) Mohammad Asgari
Doctor	(Iran) Dr. Alireza Haghighat
Physiotherapist	(Iran) Meysam Alipour (Until 24 November) (Iran) Ali Aazam (From 25 November)
Team Manager	(Iran) Afshin Peyrovani
Media Officer	(Iran) Alireza Ashraf

== Pre-season and friendlies ==
Win Draw Loss Fixtures

8 September 2020 Friendly	Persepolis	0–1	Shahr Khodro	Tehran
19:00 DST +04:30			Ghazi	Stadium: Shahid Kazemi Stadium

21 October 2020 Friendly	Persepolis	0–3	Mes Rafsanjan	Tehran
15:55 IRST +03:30			Ashouri 9'; Zahivi 40'; Naghizadeh 75'	Stadium: Shahid Kazemi Stadium

26 October 2020 Friendly	Persepolis	3–0	Malavan	Tehran
15:35 IRST +03:30	Alishah 33'; Nemati 55' (pen.); Resan 90+2'			Stadium: Shahid Kazemi Stadium

31 October 2020 Friendly	Persepolis	3–2	Gol Gohar	Tehran
15:30 IRST +03:30	Abdi 11'; Amiri 49', 60'		Mensha 18', 65'	Stadium: Shahid Kazemi Stadium

14 November 2020 Friendly	Persepolis	2–2	Baadraan	Tehran
15:35 IRST +03:30	Abdi 45'; Alishah 68'		76'; 79'	Stadium: Shahid Kazemi Stadium

1 December 2020 Friendly	Persepolis	2–1	Vista Toorbin	Tehran
11:30 IRST +03:30	Abdi; Hosseinpour		Hosseini	Stadium: Shahid Kazemi Stadium

12 December 2020 Friendly	Persepolis Red	2–0	Persepolis White	Tehran
15:00 IRST +03:30	Abdi; Alishah			Stadium: Azadi Stadium
Note: The match was played as a team game to prepare for the 2020 AFC Champions League Final.

== Competitions ==
=== Overview ===
Competition	First match	Last match	Starting round	Final position	Record							
Competition	First match	Last match	Starting round	Final position	Pld	W	D	L	GF	GA	GD	Win %
PGPL	6 November 2020	30 July 2021	Matchday 1	Winners	30	19	10	1	47	14	+33	63.33
Hazfi Cup	12 March 2021	15 July 2021	Round of 32	Quarter-finals	3	2	1	0	7	1	+6	66.67
Super Cup	20 June 2021		Final	Winners	1	1	0	0	1	0	+1	100.00
2020 ACL	15 September 2020	19 December 2020	Group stage	Runners-up	8	5	1	2	11	4	+7	62.50
2021 ACL	14 April 2021	29 April 2021	Group stage	Round of 16	6	5	0	1	14	5	+9	83.33
Total					48	32	12	4	80	24	+56	66.67

Last updated: 20 May 2021
Source: Competitions

=== Persian Gulf Pro League ===
==== Results summary ====
Overall								Home						Away					
Pld	W	D	L	GF	GA	GD	Pts	W	D	L	GF	GA	GD	W	D	L	GF	GA	GD
30	19	10	1	47	14	+33	67	13	2	0	25	6	+19	6	8	1	22	8	+14

Last updated: 24 February 2021.
Source: Ipl Stats

==== Results by round ====
Round	1	2	3	4	5	6	7	8	9	10	11	12	13	14	15	16	17	18	19	20	21	22	23	24	25	26	27	28	29	30
Ground	A	H	A	H	A	H	H	A	H	A	H	A	H	A	H	H	A	H	A	H	A	A	H	A	H	A	H	A	H	A
Result	D	W	D	W	D	D	D	D	W	W	W	L	W	W	W	W	D	W	D	W	W	D	W	W	W	D	W	W	W	W
Position	9	4	6	2	2	4	4	6	2	2	2	3	1	1	1	1	1	2	2	1	2	1	2	1	1	1	1	1	1	1

Updated to match(es) played on 10 May 2021. Source: "iranleague". Archived from the original on 2018-01-26.
A = Away; H = Home; W = Win; D = Draw; L = Loss; P = Postponed

== League table ==
Pos	Team	Pld	W	D	L	GF	GA	GD	Pts	Qualification or relegation
1	Persepolis (Note: Persepolis and Esteghlal did not obtain an AFC license. Therefore, even if they earn the right to play in Asian competitions based on league position, they will not be able to participate.) (C)	30	19	10	1	47	14	+33	67	
2	Sepahan	30	19	8	3	53	24	+29	65	Qualification for 2022 AFC Champions League group stage
3	Esteghlal	30	16	8	6	36	19	+17	56	
4	Tractor	30	12	9	9	35	29	+6	45	
5	Gol Gohar	30	13	6	11	33	32	+1	45	

Updated to match(es) played on 30 July 2021. Source: IPL Table, Soccerway
Rules for classification: 1) Points; 2) Goal difference; 3) Goals scored.
(C) Champions

== Matches ==
Win Draw Loss Postponed

Date Round	Home	Score	Away	Location

6 November 2020 1	Saipa	0–0	Persepolis	Tehran
16:30 IRST +03:30	Aliyari (yellow card) 41'; Soleimani (yellow card) 84'	Report	Kamyabinia (yellow card) 49' (yellow card) (red card) 79'; Aghaei (yellow card) 57'; Nourollahi (yellow card) 58'	Stadium: Shahid Dastgerdi Stadium; Referee: Hassan Akrami; Man of the Match: Hossein Monadi (Saipa)
Note: Due to the COVID-19 pandemic in Iran, the match was played behind closed doors.

21 November 2020 2	Persepolis	1–0	Sanat Naft	Tehran
16:20 IRST +03:30	Nemati 43' (pen.)	Report	Motlaghzadeh (yellow card) 42'	Stadium: Azadi Stadium; Referee: Mohammad Reza Akbarian; Man of the Match: Hossein Kanaanizadegan (Persepolis)
Note: Due to the COVID-19 pandemic in Iran, the match was played behind closed doors.

26 November 2020 3	Naft Masjed Soleyman	0–0	Persepolis	Masjed Soleyman
16:35 IRST +03:30	Bolboli (yellow card) 45'; Ahmadi (yellow card) 85'	Report	Nemati (penalty missed) 40'	Stadium: Behnam Mohammadi Stadium; Referee: Ashkan Khorshidi; Man of the Match: Hossein Kanaanizadegan (Persepolis)
Note: Due to the COVID-19 pandemic in Iran, the match was played behind closed doors.

30 November 2020 4	Persepolis	3–0	Padideh	Tehran
16:15 IRST +03:30	J. Hosseini 41'; Nourollahi 85'; Sarlak (yellow card) 36' (goal) 89'	Report		Stadium: Azadi Stadium; Referee: Reza Kermanshahi; Man of the Match: Milad Sarlak (Persepolis)
Note: Due to the COVID-19 pandemic in Iran, the match was played behind closed doors.

25 December 2020 5	Nassaji Mazandaran	1–1	Persepolis	Qaemshahr
15:00 IRST +03:30	Bijan 41'; Tahmasebi (yellow card) 59'; Shiri (yellow card) 60'; Kalantari (yellow card) 65'; Ghasemi (yellow card) 85'	Report	Kanaanizadegan (yellow card) 40'; Nourollahi 85'; Lak (yellow card) 91'	Stadium: Vatani Stadium; Referee: Mooud Bonyadifar; Man of the Match: Siamak Nemati (Persepolis)
Note: Due to the COVID-19 pandemic in Iran, the match was played behind closed doors.

31 December 2020 6	Persepolis	1–1	Zob Ahan	Tehran
15:00 IRST +03:30	Aghaei (yellow card) 9' (yellow card) (red card) 89'; Alishah 17'; Nemati (yellow card) 56'; Kamyabinia (yellow card) 61'	Report	Jahani (yellow card) 15' (goal) 90'; Ghanbari (yellow card) 35'; Hosseini (red card) 89'; Mohammadi Mehr (yellow card) 95'	Stadium: Azadi Stadium; Referee: Bijan Heydari; Man of the Match: Omid Alishah (Persepolis)
Note: Due to the COVID-19 pandemic in Iran, the match was played behind closed doors.

5 January 2021 7	Persepolis	0–0	Sepahan	Tehran
16:30 IRST +03:30		Report	Kiros (yellow card) 14'; Rafiei (yellow card) 59'	Stadium: Azadi Stadium; Referee: Ashkan Khorshidi; Man of the Match: Hamed Lak (Persepolis)
Note: Due to the COVID-19 pandemic in Iran, the match was played behind closed doors.

11 January 2021 8	Esteghlal	2–2	Persepolis	Tehran
16:35 IRST +03:30	Motahari 2'; Mousavi (yellow card) 41'; Gholami (yellow card) 55'; Ghayedi 90+3'	Report	Abdi 51'; Amiri 66'; Kanaanizadegan (yellow card) 76'; Sarlak (yellow card) 81'	Stadium: Azadi Stadium; Referee: Reza Kermanshahi; Man of the Match: Ehsan Pahlavan (Persepolis)
Note: Due to the COVID-19 pandemic in Iran, the match was played behind closed doors.

18 January 2021 11	Persepolis	2–1	Foolad	Tehran
16:40 IRST +03:30	Abdi 29'; Kanaanizadegan (yellow card) 62'; Nourollahi (yellow card) 66' (goal) 77'; Lak (yellow card) 93'	Report	Abshak (yellow card) 45'; Pereira 64' (pen.)	Stadium: Azadi Stadium; Referee: Mohammad Hossein Zahedifard; Man of the Match: Ahmad Nourollahi (Persepolis)
Note: Due to the COVID-19 pandemic in Iran, the match was played behind closed doors.

25 January 2021 12	Aluminium Arak	2–1	Persepolis	Arak
15:00 IRST +03:30	Sharifat (yellow card) 15'; Tavakoli 20'; Pakdel 30' (yellow card) 51'	Report	Kamyabinia 7' (yellow card) 60'	Stadium: Imam Khomeini Stadium; Referee: Vahid Kazemi; Man of the Match: Omid Singh (Aluminium Arak)
Note: Due to the COVID-19 pandemic in Iran, the match was played behind closed doors.

30 January 2021 13	Persepolis	2–1	Machine Sazi	Tehran
16:55 IRST +03:30	Amiri 25'; Nourollahi 90+3'	Report	Bagheri (yellow card) 45'; Babaei 83' (pen.); Karimi (yellow card) 90+5'	Stadium: Azadi Stadium; Referee: Ali Safaie; Man of the Match: Vahid Amiri (Persepolis)
Note: Due to the COVID-19 pandemic in Iran, the match was played behind closed doors.

4 February 2021 14	Tractor	0–1	Persepolis	Tabriz
15:00 IRST +03:30	Fakhreddini (yellow card) 8'; Imani (yellow card) 57'	Report	J. Hosseini 53'; Aghaei (yellow card) 65'; Lak (yellow card) 69'	Stadium: Yadegar-e Emam Stadium; Referee: Mahdi Seyed Ali; Man of the Match: Siamak Nemati (Persepolis)
Note: Due to the COVID-19 pandemic in Iran, the match was played behind closed doors.

9 February 2021 9	Persepolis	1–0	Mes Rafsanjan	Tehran
17:00 IRST +03:30	J. Hosseini 51'	Report	Rezaei (yellow card) 54'; Karimzadeh (yellow card) 68' (yellow-red card) 78'; Kaabi (yellow card) 85'	Stadium: Azadi Stadium; Referee: Hamid Haj Malek; Man of the Match: Jalal Hosseini (Persepolis)
Note: Due to the COVID-19 pandemic in Iran, the match was played behind closed doors.

14 February 2021 15	Persepolis	1–0	Paykan	Tehran
17:15 IRST +03:30	Nourollahi 54'; Sarlak (yellow card) 87'	Report		Stadium: Azadi Stadium; Referee: Reza Adel; Man of the Match: Ahmad Nourollahi (Persepolis)
Note: Due to the COVID-19 pandemic in Iran, the match was played behind closed doors.

19 February 2021 10	Gol Gohar	0–5	Persepolis	Sirjan
15:40 IRST +03:30	Barzay (yellow card) (red card) 84'; Alizadeh (yellow card) 86'	Report	Nourollahi 30'; Alishah 60'; Shiri 68'; Zendehrouh 72' (o.g.); Nemati 88'	Stadium: Imam Ali Stadium; Referee: Payam Heidari; Man of the Match: Omid Alishah (Persepolis)
Note: Due to the COVID-19 pandemic in Iran, the match was played behind closed doors.

1 March 2021 16	Persepolis	1–0	Saipa	Tehran
17:25 IRST +03:30	J. Hosseini 6'; Alishah (yellow card) 21'; Shiri (yellow card) 45'; Aghaei (yellow card) 79'	Report		Stadium: Azadi Stadium; Referee: Reza Mahdavi; Man of the Match: Siamak Nemati (Persepolis)
Note: Due to the COVID-19 pandemic in Iran, the match was played behind closed doors.

6 March 2021 17	Sanat Naft	0–0	Persepolis	Abadan
15:00 IRST +03:30	Nassari (yellow card) 76'	Report		Stadium: Takhti Abadan; Referee: Amir Arab Baraghi; Man of the Match: Hossein Saki (Sanat Naft)
Note: Due to the COVID-19 pandemic in Iran, the match was played behind closed doors.

18 March 2021 18	Persepolis	2–1	Naft Masjed Soleyman	Tehran
15:00 IRST +03:30	Torabi 32'; Shiri (yellow card) 51'; Amiri 68'; Nemati (yellow card) 72' (yellow card) (red card) 75'; J. Hosseini (yellow card) 80'	Report	Bolboli (yellow card) 7'; Majd (yellow card) 7'; Tohidast 53'; Mohebi (yellow card) 90+3'	Stadium: Azadi Stadium; Referee: Bijan Heydari; Man of the Match: Mehdi Torabi (Persepolis)
Note: Due to the COVID-19 pandemic in Iran, the match was played behind closed doors.

3 April 2021 19	Padideh	1–1	Persepolis	Mashhad
16:30 IRST +03:30	Ghaseminejad 45'	Report	Sarlak (yellow card) 56'; Sarlak 69'	Stadium: Imam Reza Stadium; Referee: Ali Safaei; Man of the Match: Milad Sarlak (Persepolis)
Note: Due to the COVID-19 pandemic in Iran, the match was played behind closed doors.

8 April 2021 20	Persepolis	2–0	Nassaji Mazandaran	Tehran
18:50 IRST +03:30	Kanaanizadegan 8'; Lak (yellow card) 42'; Alekasir 91'	Report	Ghahari (yellow card) 44'; Dehghani (yellow card) 61'	Stadium: Azadi Stadium; Referee: Mohammad Hossein Zahedifard; Man of the Match: Mehdi Torabi (Persepolis)
Note: Due to the COVID-19 pandemic in Iran, the match was played behind closed doors.

9 May 2021 22	Sepahan	1–1	Persepolis	Esfahan
20:25 IRST +03:30	Pourghaz (yellow card) 14'; Rafiei (yellow card) 44'; Mohebi 87'; Hajsafi (yellow card) 90'	Report	Amiri (yellow card) 4'; Torabi (yellow card) 35'; Alekasir 55'	Stadium: Naghsh-e-Jahan; Referee: Bijan Heydari; Man of the Match: Kamal Kamyabinia (Persepolis)
Note: Due to the COVID-19 pandemic in Iran, the match was played behind closed doors.

14 May 2021 23	Persepolis	1–0	Esteghlal	Tehran
20:30 IRST +03:30	Moghanlou (yellow card) 30'; Amiri (yellow card) 52'; Alekasir 55'; Lak (yellow card) 65'; Alekasir (yellow card) 82'; Faraji (red card) 90+8'	Report	Naderi (yellow card) 90+8'	Stadium: Azadi Stadium; Referee: Mohammad Reza Akbarian; Man of the Match: Vahid Amiri (Persepolis)
Note: Due to the COVID-19 pandemic in Iran, the match was played behind closed doors.

24 May 2021 21	Zob Ahan	1–2	Persepolis	Esfahan
19:30 IRST +03:30	Asadbeigi 37'; Mohammadi Mehr (yellow card) 60'	Report	Torabi (yellow card) 64'; Moghanlou 69'; Abdi 81'	Stadium: Foolad Shahr Stadium; Referee: Koopal Nezemi; Man of the Match: Omid Alishah (Persepolis)
Note: Due to the COVID-19 pandemic in Iran, the match was played behind closed doors.

25 June 2021 24	Mes Rafsanjan	0–1	Persepolis	Rafsanjan
19:15 IRST +03:30	Noormohammadi (yellow card) 40'	Report	Abdi 79'	Stadium: Shohadaye Mes Stadium; Referee: Javad Rahimzadeh; Man of the Match: Omid Alishah (Persepolis)
Note: Due to the COVID-19 pandemic in Iran, the match was played behind closed doors.

30 June 2021 25	Persepolis	3–1	Gol Gohar	Tehran
19:50 IRST +03:30	Torabi 12' (pen.), 27'; Alishah (yellow card) 28'; Sarlak (yellow card) 49'; Kanaanizadegan (yellow card) 62'; Nourollahi 84'	Report	Shakeri 39'; Shekari (yellow card) 43'	Stadium: Azadi Stadium; Referee: Ashkan Khorshidi; Man of the Match: Mehdi Torabi (Persepolis)
Note: Due to the COVID-19 pandemic in Iran, the match was played behind closed doors.

6 July 2021 26	Foolad	0–0	Persepolis	Ahvaz
21:10 IRST +03:30	Abshak (yellow card) 45'; Patosi (yellow card) 66'	Report	Moghanlou (yellow card) 45'; Amiri (yellow card) 64'	Stadium: Foolad Arena; Referee: Vahid Kazemi; Man of the Match: Moussa Coulibaly (Foolad)
Note: Due to the COVID-19 pandemic in Iran, the match was played behind closed doors.

10 July 2021 27	Persepolis	2–0	Aluminium Arak	Tehran
20:55 IRST +03:30	Torabi 23'; Moghanlou 34'; Aghaei (yellow card) 81'	Report	Monazzemi (yellow card) 94'	Stadium: Azadi Stadium; Referee: Amir Arab Baraghi; Man of the Match: Mehdi Torabi (Persepolis)
Note: Due to the COVID-19 pandemic in Iran, the match was played behind closed doors.

20 July 2021 28	Machine Sazi	0–5	Persepolis	Tabriz
21:15 IRST +03:30	Bagheri (yellow card) 10' (yellow card) (red card) 38'		Moghanlou 13', 90'; Abdi 24', 24'; Nourollahi 43'; Kanaanizadegan (yellow card) 89'	Stadium: Marzdaran Stadium; Referee: Mahdi Seyed Ali; Man of the Match: Mehdi Abdi (Persepolis)
Note: Due to the COVID-19 pandemic in Iran, the match was played behind closed doors.

25 July 2021 29	Persepolis	3–1	Tractor	Tehran
21:15 IRST +03:30	Moghanlou (yellow card) 21'; Abdi 64', 90+4'; Nourollahi 68'		Babaei 50'; Salami (yellow card) 58'; Irankhah (yellow card) 80'	Stadium: Azadi Stadium; Referee: Mohammad Hossein Zahedifard; Man of the Match: Mehdi Abdi (Persepolis)
Note: Due to the COVID-19 pandemic in Iran, the match was played behind closed doors.

30 July 2021 30	Paykan	0–2	Persepolis	Shahr-e Qods
21:15 IRST +03:30	Mohammadi (yellow card) 60'; Pour Amini (yellow card) 81'		Abdi 9'; Nourollahi 22'	Stadium: Shahr-e Qods Stadium; Referee: Mooud Bonyadifar; Man of the Match: Vahid Amiri (Persepolis)
Note: Due to the COVID-19 pandemic in Iran, the match was played behind closed doors.

=== Score overview ===
Win Draw Loss

Opposition	Home score	Away score	Aggregate score
Aluminium Arak	2–0	2–1	3–2
Esteghlal	1–0	2–2	3–2
Foolad	2–1	0–0	2–1
Gol Gohar	3–1	0–5	8–1
Machine Sazi	2–1	0–5	7–1
Mes Rafsanjan	1–0	0–1	2–0
Naft Masjed Soleyman	2–1	0–0	2–1
Nassaji	2–0	1–1	3–1
Padideh	3–0	1–1	4–1
Paykan	1–0	0–2	3–0
Saipa	1–0	0–0	1–0
Sanat Naft	1–0	0–0	1–0
Sepahan	0–0	1–1	1–1
Tractor	3–1	0–1	4–1
Zob Ahan	1–1	1–2	3–2

== Hazfi Cup ==
=== Matches ===
Win Draw Loss Postponed

Date Round	Home	Score	Away	Location

12 March 2021 Round of 32	Mes Novin Kerman	0–3	Persepolis	Kerman
15:00 IRST +03:30		Report	Kamyabinia 38'; Alishah 58', 64'	Stadium: Imam Ali Stadium; Referee: Mohammad Hossein Torabian; Man of the Match: Omid Alishah (Persepolis)
Note: Due to the COVID-19 pandemic in Iran, the match was played behind closed doors.

18 May 2021 Round of 16	Shahin Bandar Ameri	1–4	Persepolis	Tangestan
20:30 IRST +03:30	Daryanavardi 34'	Report	Abdi 7', 87'; Nourollahi 61'; Torabi 80' (pen.)	Stadium: Shohadaye Ahrom; Referee: Roohollah Sharifi; Man of the Match: Mehdi Abdi (Persepolis)
Note: Due to the COVID-19 pandemic in Iran, the match was played behind closed doors.

15 July 2021 Quarter Finals	Persepolis	0–0 (a.e.t.) (3–4 p)	Esteghlal	Tehran
19:45 IRST +03:30	Moghanlou (yellow card) 23'; Nemati (yellow card) 79'		Moradmand (yellow card) 2'	Stadium: Azadi Stadium; Referee: Alireza Faghani; Man of the Match: Siavash Yazdani (Esteghlal)
	Penalties
	Mehdi Torabi (penalty scored); Hossein Kanaanizadegan (penalty scored); Saeid Aghaei (penalty scored); Issa Alekasir (penalty missed); Mehdi Abdi (penalty missed)		(penalty scored) Vouria Ghafouri; (penalty scored) Farshid Esmaeili; (penalty scored) Babak Moradi; (penalty scored) Amir Arsalan Motahari; (penalty missed) Mehdi Ghayedi
Note: Due to the COVID-19 pandemic in Iran, the match was played behind closed doors.

== Super Cup ==
20 June 2021 Final	Persepolis	1–0	Tractor	Tehran
20:00 IRST +03:30	Aghaei (yellow card) 55'; Alekasir 61'; Moghanlou (yellow card) 81'	Report	Fakhreddini (yellow card) 45+2'; Ghaderi (yellow card) 72'; Tikdari (red card) 78'	Stadium: Azadi Stadium; Referee: Ali Safaei; Man of the Match: Issa Alekasir (Persepolis)
Note: Due to the COVID-19 pandemic in Iran, the match was played behind closed doors.

== 2020 AFC Champions League ==
=== 2020 AFC Champions League ===
==== Group stage ====
Pos	Team	Pld	W	D	L	GF	GA	GD	Pts	Qualification	PRS	TAW	DUH	SHJ
1	(Iran) Persepolis	6	3	1	2	8	5	+3	10	Advance to knockout stage	—	1–0	0–1	4–0
2	(Saudi Arabia) Al-Taawoun	6	3	0	3	4	8	−4	9 (Note: Head-to-head points: Al-Taawoun 6, Al-Duhail 0.)	Advance to knockout stage	0–1	—	2–0	0–6
3	(Qatar) Al-Duhail	6	3	0	3	7	8	−1	9		2–0	0–1	—	2–1
4	(United Arab Emirates) Sharjah	6	2	1	3	13	11	+2	7		2–2	0–1	4–2	—

Source: AFC
Rules for classification: Tiebreakers

==== Matches ====
Win Draw Loss Postponed

Date Round	Home	Score	Away	Location

15 September 2020 3	Persepolis (Iran)	1–0	(Saudi Arabia) Al-Taawoun	Doha, Qatar
22:30	Nemati (yellow card) 27'; Nourollahi (yellow card) 41'; Khalilzadeh 83'	Report	Al-Mousa (yellow card) 85'	Stadium: Education City Stadium; Attendance: 0 Referee: Ahmed Al-Kaf (Oman); Man of the Match: Shojae Khalilzadeh (Persepolis)

18 September 2020 4	Al-Taawoun (Saudi Arabia)	0–1	(Iran) Persepolis	Doha, Qatar
22:30 UTC+3	Assiri (yellow card) 18'; Amissi (yellow card) 64'	Report	Rasan 48' (pen.); Lak (yellow card) 87'; Ramezani (yellow card) 87'	Stadium: Education City Stadium; Attendance: 0 Referee: Mohanad Qasim (Iraq); Man of the Match: Vahid Amiri (Persepolis)

21 September 2020 5	Persepolis (Iran)	0–1	(Qatar) Al-Duhail	Doha, Qatar (Al-Duhail)
19:30 UTC+4:30	Khalilzadeh (yellow card) 27'	Report	Luiz Júnior (yellow card) 22'; Ali 60' (pen.); Rezaeian (yellow card) 90+1'; Al-Bakri (yellow card) 90+4'	Stadium: Education City Stadium; Attendance: 0 Referee: Hettikamkanamge Perera (Sri Lanka); Man of the Match: Almoez Ali

24 September 2020 6	Persepolis (Iran)	4–0	(United Arab Emirates) Sharjah	Doha, Qatar
22:30 UTC+4:30	Khalilzadeh 2'; Alekasir 41'; Amiri 44'; Alishah (yellow card) 83'; Abdi 90+1'; Ramezani (yellow card) 90+5'	Report		Stadium: Jassim bin Hamad Stadium; Attendance: 0 Referee: Ilgiz Tantashev (Uzbekistan); Man of the Match: Siamak Nemati (Persepolis)

=== Knockout stage ===
27 September 2020 Round of 16	Persepolis (Iran)	1–0	(Qatar) Al-Sadd	Doha, Qatar
16:45 UTC+3	Amiri (yellow card) 64'; Sarlak (yellow card) 81'; Alekasir 88'; Alekasir (yellow card) 89'; Nemati (red card) 90+1'	Live Report; Stats Report	Bounedjah (yellow card) 90+1'	Stadium: Education City Stadium; Attendance: 0 Referee: Ko Hyung-jin (South Korea); Man of the Match: Hossein Kanaanizadegan (Persepolis)

30 September 2020 Quarter-finals	Persepolis (Iran)	2–0	(Uzbekistan) Pakhtakor	Doha, Qatar
20:45 UTC+3	Alekasir 49', 66'	Live Report; Stats Report	Masharipov (red card) 15'	Stadium: Jassim Bin Hamad Stadium; Attendance: 0 Referee: Adham Makhadmeh (Jordan); Man of the Match: Issa Alekasir (Persepolis)

11 December 2020 Semi-finals	Al Nassr (Saudi Arabia)	1–1 (a.e.t.) (3–5 p)	(Iran) Persepolis	Doha, Qatar
18:00 UTC+3	Hamdallah 36' (pen.) Al-Sulaiheem (yellow card) 49' Madu (yellow card) 78'	Live Report; Stats Report	Khalilzadeh (yellow card) 37' Abdi 42' Pahlavan (yellow card) 84' (yellow card) (red card) 104' Amiri (yellow card) 90+1'	Stadium: Jassim Bin Hamad Stadium; Attendance: 0 Referee: Muhammad Taqi (Singapore); Man of the Match: Bashar Resan (Persepolis)
	Penalties
	Madu (penalty scored); Martínez (penalty scored); Al-Obaid (penalty scored); Maicon (penalty missed)		(penalty scored) Kanaanizadegan; (penalty scored) Nemati; (penalty scored) Sarlak; (penalty scored) Khalilzadeh; (penalty scored) Shojaei

19 December 2020 Final	Persepolis (Iran)	1–2	(South Korea) Ulsan Hyundai	Doha, Qatar
15:00 UTC+3	Abdi 45'	Live Report; Stats Report	Júnior Negrão 45+4', 55' (pen.) Bulthuis (yellow card) 79' Júnior Negrão (yellow card) 82' Kim Tae-hwan (yellow card) 90+6'	Stadium: Al Janoub Stadium; Attendance: 8,517; Referee: Abdulrahman Al-Jassim (Qatar); Man of the Match: Milad Sarlak (Persepolis)

== 2021 AFC Champions League ==
=== Group stage ===
Group E

Pos	Team	Pld	W	D	L	GF	GA	GD	Pts	Qualification	PER	WAH	GOA	RAY
1	(Iran) Persepolis	6	5	0	1	14	5	+9	15	Advance to Round of 16	—	1–0	2–1	4–2
2	(United Arab Emirates) Al-Wahda	6	4	1	1	7	3	+4	13	Advance to Round of 16	1–0	—	0–0	3–2
3	(India) Goa (H)	6	0	3	3	2	9	−7	3		0–4	0–2	—	0–0
4	(Qatar) Al-Rayyan	6	0	2	4	6	12	−6	2		1–3	0–1	1–1	—

Source: AFC
Rules for classification: Tiebreakers
(H) Hosts

==== Matches ====
Win Draw Loss Postponed

Date Round	Home	Score	Away	Location

14 April 2021 1	Persepolis (Iran)	1–0	(United Arab Emirates) Al Wahda	Margao, India
20:00 UTC+5:30	Hosseini 40'; Alishah (yellow card) 55'	Report	Al-Mehrezi (yellow card) 25'; Esmaeel (yellow card) 43'	Stadium: Fatorda Stadium; Referee: Hiroyuki Kimura (Japan); Man of the Match: Jalal Hosseini (Persepolis)
Note: Due to the COVID-19 pandemic, the match was played behind closed doors.

17 April 2021 2	Al-Rayyan (Qatar)	1–3	(Iran) Persepolis	Margao, India
22:30 UTC+5:30	Alaaeldin (yellow card) 7'; Al-Hadhrami 19'; Kom (yellow card) 51'; Traoré (yellow card) 59'	Report	Kamyabinia 47'; Moghanlou 49', 57'	Stadium: Fatorda Stadium; Referee: Ilgiz Tantashev (Uzbekistan); Man of the Match: Kamal Kamyabinia (Persepolis)
Note: Due to the COVID-19 pandemic, the match was played behind closed doors.

20 April 2021 3	Persepolis (Iran)	2–1	(India) Goa	Margao, India
22:30 UTC+5:30	Torabi 18' (pen.); Hosseini 24'	Report	Bedia 14' (yellow card) 64'; Fernandes (yellow card) 10'; Gama (yellow card) 15'	Stadium: Fatorda Stadium; Referee: Hanna Hattab (Syria); Man of the Match: Dheeraj Singh (Goa)
Note: Due to the COVID-19 pandemic, the match was played behind closed doors.

23 April 2021 4	Goa (India)	0–4	(Iran) Persepolis	Margao, India
22:30 UTC+5:30	D'Cunha (yellow card) 15'	Report	Moghanlou 24'; Torabi 42' (pen.); Alekasir 47'; Kamyabinia 58'	Stadium: Fatorda Stadium; Referee: Hiroyuki Kimura (Japan); Man of the Match: Shahriyar Moghanlou (Persepolis)
Note: Due to the COVID-19 pandemic, the match was played behind closed doors.

26 April 2021 5	Al Wahda (United Arab Emirates)	1–0	(Iran) Persepolis	Margao, India
20:00 UTC+5:30	Matavž 5'; Jumaa (yellow card) 13'; Al Karbi (yellow card) 45+4'; Al-Harbi (yellow card) 71'; Anwer (red card) 83'; Al-Shamsi (yellow card) 85'; Hamad (yellow card) 87'	Report	Torabi (yellow card) 45+4'; Amiri (yellow card) 76'	Stadium: Fatorda Stadium; Referee: Ilgiz Tantashev (Uzbekistan); Man of the Match: Tim Matavž (Al Wahda)
Note: Due to the COVID-19 pandemic, the match was played behind closed doors.

29 April 2021 6	Persepolis (Iran)	4–2	(Qatar) Al-Rayyan	Margao, India
20:00 UTC+5:30	Moghanlou (yellow card) 12', (goal) 27'; Pahlavan 34'; Kanaanizadegan (yellow card) 53', (goal) 68'; Alekasir 73'	Report	Awad (yellow card) 41'; Boli 48', 72'; Khalilzadeh (yellow card) 52'; Kom (yellow card) 79'	Stadium: Fatorda Stadium; Referee: Hiroyuki Kimura (Japan); Man of the Match: Yohan Boli (Al-Rayyan)
Note: Due to the COVID-19 pandemic, the match was played behind closed doors.

== Statistics ==
No.	Pos	Nat	Player	Total		PGPL		Hazfi Cup		2020 ACL		2021 ACL		Super Cup	
No.	Pos	Nat	Player	Apps	Goals	Apps	Goals	Apps	Goals	Apps	Goals	Apps	Goals	Apps	Goals
2	MF	(Iran)	Omid Alishah	39	4	24	2	1	2	7	0	6	0	1	0
3	DF	(Iran)	Farshad Faraji	5	0	4	0	0	0	0	0	1	0	0	0
4	DF	(Iran)	Jalal Hosseini	37	6	25	4	1	0	5	0	5	2	1	0
6	DF	(Iran)	Hossein Kanaanizadegan	35	2	21	1	0	0	7	0	6	1	1	0
8	MF	(Iran)	Ahmad Nourollahi	41	9	27	8	1	1	8	0	4	0	1	0
9	FW	(Iran)	Mehdi Mehdikhani	15	0	11	0	2	0	0	0	2	0	0	0
10	MF	(Iran)	Milad Sarlak	39	2	26	2	1	0	6	0	5	0	1	0
11	MF	(Iran)	Kamal Kamyabinia	27	4	16	1	1	1	5	0	5	2	0	0
14	MF	(Iran)	Ehsan Pahlavan	43	1	27	0	2	0	7	0	6	1	1	0,
16	FW	(Iran)	Mehdi Abdi	36	9	23	4	2	2	5	3	5	0	1	0
17	DF	(Iran)	Mehdi Shiri	29	1	20	1	1	0	3	0	4	0	1	0
18	MF	(Iran)	Mohammad Sharifi	8	0	4	0	2	0	0	0	2	0	0	0
19	MF	(Iran)	Vahid Amiri	38	4	24	3	1	0	7	1	6	0	0	0
21	MF	(Iran)	Mehdi Torabi	19	7	10	4	2	1	0	0	6	2	1	0
23	MF	(Iran)	Ali Shojaei	21	0	11	0	1	0	4	0	5	0	0	0
25	FW	(Iran)	Alireza Khodaei	1	0	0	0	1	0	0	0	0	0	0	0
34	GK	(Iran)	Amir Mohammad Yousefi	0	0	0	0	0	0	0	0	0	0	0	0
44	GK	(Croatia)	Božidar Radošević	4	0	1	0	2	0	0	0	1	0	0	0
70	FW	(Iran)	Shahriyar Moghanlou	19	6	10	2	2	0	0	0	6	4	1	0
72	FW	(Iran)	Issa Alekasir	23	10	8	3	2	0	6	4	6	2	1	1
77	DF	(Iran)	Saeid Aghaei	30	0	21	0	2	0	6	0	0	0	1	0
81	GK	(Iran)	Hamed Lak	40	0	26	0	0	0	8	0	5	0	1	0
88	MF	(Iran)	Siamak Nemati	36	2	21	2	1	0	8	0	5	0	1	0
99	DF	(Iran)	Amir Mohammad Kharkesh	0	0	0	0	0	0	0	0	0	0	0	0
Players transferred/loaned out during the season
3	DF	(Iran)	Shojae Khalilzadeh	7	2	0	0	0	0	7	2	0	0	0	0
5	MF	(Iraq)	Bashar Resan	11	1	3	0	0	0	8	1	0	0	0	0
15	DF	(Iran)	Mohammad Ansari	2	0	1	0	1	0	0	0	0	0	0	0
20	FW	(Iran)	Amir Roostaei	0	0	0	0	0	0	0	0	0	0	0	0
26	MF	(Iran)	Saeid Hosseinpour	1	0	1	0	0	0	0	0	0	0	0	0
28	FW	(Iran)	Alireza Maleki	0	0	0	0	0	0	0	0	0	0	0	0
33	DF	(Iran)	Sina Mahdavi	0	0	0	0	0	0	0	0	0	0	0	0
36	FW	(Iran)	Arman Ramezani	14	0	8	0	0	0	6	0	0	0	0	0
38	DF	(Iran)	Ehsan Hosseini	3	0	3	0	0	0	0	0	0	0	0	0

Last updated: 15 July 2021
Source: Competitions

Player left the club during the season.

=== Scorers ===
Rank	No	N	P	Name	PGPL	Hazfi Cup	2020 ACL	2021 ACL	Super Cup	Total
1	16	(Iran)	FW	Mehdi Abdi	9	2	3			14
2	8	(Iran)	MF	Ahmad Nourollahi	10	1				11
3	72	(Iran)	FW	Issa Alekasir	3		4	2	1	10
4	70	(Iran)	FW	Shahriyar Moghanlou	4			4		8
5	21	(Iran)	MF	Mehdi Torabi	4	1		2		7
6	4	(Iran)	DF	Jalal Hosseini	4			2		6
7	2	(Iran)	MF	Omid Alishah	2	2				4
7	19	(Iran)	MF	Vahid Amiri	3		1			4
7	11	(Iran)	MF	Kamal Kamyabinia	1	1		2		4
10	3	(Iran)	DF	Shojae Khalilzadeh			2			2
10	88	(Iran)	MF	Siamak Nemati	2					2
10	10	(Iran)	MF	Milad Sarlak	2					2
10	6	(Iran)	DF	Hossein Kanaanizadegan	1			1		2
14	5	(Iraq)	MF	Bashar Resan			1			1
14	17	(Iran)	DF	Mehdi Shiri	1					1
14	14	(Iran)	MF	Ehsan Pahlavan				1		1
Own goal					1					1
Total					47	7	11	14		79
Last updated: 31 July 2021

=== Assists ===
Rank	No	N	P	Name	PGPL	Hazfi Cup	2020 ACL	2021 ACL	Super Cup	Total
1	2	(Iran)	MF	Omid Alishah	6		1	3	1	11
2	21	(Iran)	MF	Mehdi Torabi	4	1		5		10
3	77	(Iran)	DF	Saeid Aghaei	4	2	1^{*}			7
4	88	(Iran)	MF	Siamak Nemati	3		2	1		6
5	8	(Iran)	MF	Ahmad Nourollahi	5					5
6	14	(Iran)	MF	Ehsan Pahlavan	1	1	2			4
6	19	(Iran)	MF	Vahid Amiri	4					4
8	10	(Iran)	MF	Milad Sarlak	2	1				3
8	70	(Iran)	FW	Shahriyar Moghanlou	2			1		3
10	5	(Iraq)	MF	Bashar Resan			2			2
11	36	(Iran)	FW	Arman Ramezani			1			1
11	11	(Iran)	MF	Kamal Kamyabinia	1					1
11	17	(Iran)	DF	Mehdi Shiri		1				1
11	16	(Iran)	FW	Mehdi Abdi	1					1
11	23	(Iran)	MF	Ali Shojaei	1					1
Total					35	6	9	10	1	61
Last updated: 31 July 2021

- Assist leader of competition

^{*} Aghaei provided 3 assists in 2020 ACL, 2 assists provided before the 3rd match of group stage in 2019–20 season for Sepahan.

=== Goalkeeping ===
				PGPL			Hazfi Cup			2020 ACL			2021 ACL			Super Cup			Total		
Rank	No	N	Name	M	GA	CS	M	GA	CS	M	GA	CS	M	GA	CS	M	GA	CS	M	GA	CS
1	81	(Iran)	Hamed Lak	29	14	17	1	0	1	8	4	5	5	5	1	1	0	1	44	23	25
2	44	(Croatia)	Božidar Radošević	1	0	1	2	1	1				1	0	1				4	1	3
3	34	(Iran)	Amir Mohammad Yousefi																		
Total				30	14	18	3	1	2	8	4	5	6	5	2	1	0	1	48	24	28
Last updated: 31 July 2021

- Most clean sheets of competition

=== Man of the Match ===
Rank	No	N	P	Name	PGPL	Hazfi Cup	2020 ACL	2021 ACL	Super Cup	Total
1	2	(Iran)	MF	Omid Alishah	4	1				5
2	88	(Iran)	MF	Siamak Nemati	3		1			4
2	21	(Iran)	MF	Mehdi Torabi	4					4
2	19	(Iran)	MF	Vahid Amiri	3		1			4
5	6	(Iran)	DF	Hossein Kanaanizadegan	2		1			3
5	10	(Iran)	MF	Milad Sarlak	2		1			3
5	16	(Iran)	FW	Mehdi Abdi	2	1				3
8	8	(Iran)	MF	Ahmad Nourollahi	2					2
8	4	(Iran)	DF	Jalal Hosseini	1			1		2
8	11	(Iran)	MF	Kamal Kamyabinia	1			1		2
8	7	(Iran)	FW	Issa Alekasir			1		1	2
12	3	(Iran)	DF	Shojae Khalilzadeh			1			1
12	5	(Iraq)	MF	Bashar Resan			1			1
12	81	(Iran)	GK	Hamed Lak	1					1
12	14	(Iran)	MF	Ehsan Pahlavan	1					1
12	70	(Iran)	FW	Shahriyar Moghanlou				1		1
Total					26	2	7	3	1	39
Last updated: 31 July 2021

^{*} Based on Metrica statistics, Statistical and technical reference of Iranian football
^{*} In ACL based on Asian Football Confederation

=== Disciplinary record ===
Includes all competitive matches. Players with 1 card or more are included only.

N	P	Nat.	Name	PGPL			Hazfi Cup			2020 ACL			2021 ACL			Super Cup			Total			Notes
N	P	Nat.	Name	Yellow card	Second yellow card	Red card	Yellow card	Second yellow card	Red card	Yellow card	Second yellow card	Red card	Yellow card	Second yellow card	Red card	Yellow card	Second yellow card	Red card	Yellow card	Second yellow card	Red card	Notes
77	DF	(Iran)	Saeid Aghaei	5	1											1			6	1		
10	MF	(Iran)	Milad Sarlak	5						1									6			
81	GK	(Iran)	Hamed Lak	5						1									6			
19	MF	(Iran)	Vahid Amiri	3						2			1						6			
88	MF	(Iran)	Siamak Nemati	2	1					1		1							3	1	1	
6	DF	(Iran)	Hossein Kanaanizadegan	4									1						5			
11	MF	(Iran)	Kamal Kamyabinia	3	1														3	1		
2	MF	(Iran)	Omid Alishah	2						1			1						4			
70	FW	(Iran)	Shahriyar Moghanlou	2									1			1			4			
8	MF	(Iran)	Ahmad Nourollahi	2						1									3			
17	DF	(Iran)	Mehdi Shiri	3															3			
21	MF	(Iran)	Mehdi Torabi	2									1						3			
14	MF	(Iran)	Ehsan Pahlavan							1	1								1	1		
72	FW	(Iran)	Issa Alekasir	1						1									2			
36	FW	(Iran)	Arman Ramezani							2									2			
3	DF	(Iran)	Shojae Khalilzadeh							2									2			
3	DF	(Iran)	Farshad Faraji			1															1	
4	DF	(Iran)	Jalal Hosseini	1															1			

== Club ==
=== Kit ===
Supplier: (Germany) Uhlsport

First half season and 2020 ACL: Home Kit / Away Kit / Third Kit*	Second half season and 2021 ACL: Home Kit / Away Kit / Third Kit

- After the death of Mehrdad Minavand and Ali Ansarian

=== Sponsorship ===
- Main sponsor: Tourism Bank
- Other sponsors: Irancell
  - Bonmano coffee
- Official shirt manufacturer: Uhlsport
