= 2020 AFC Champions League final =

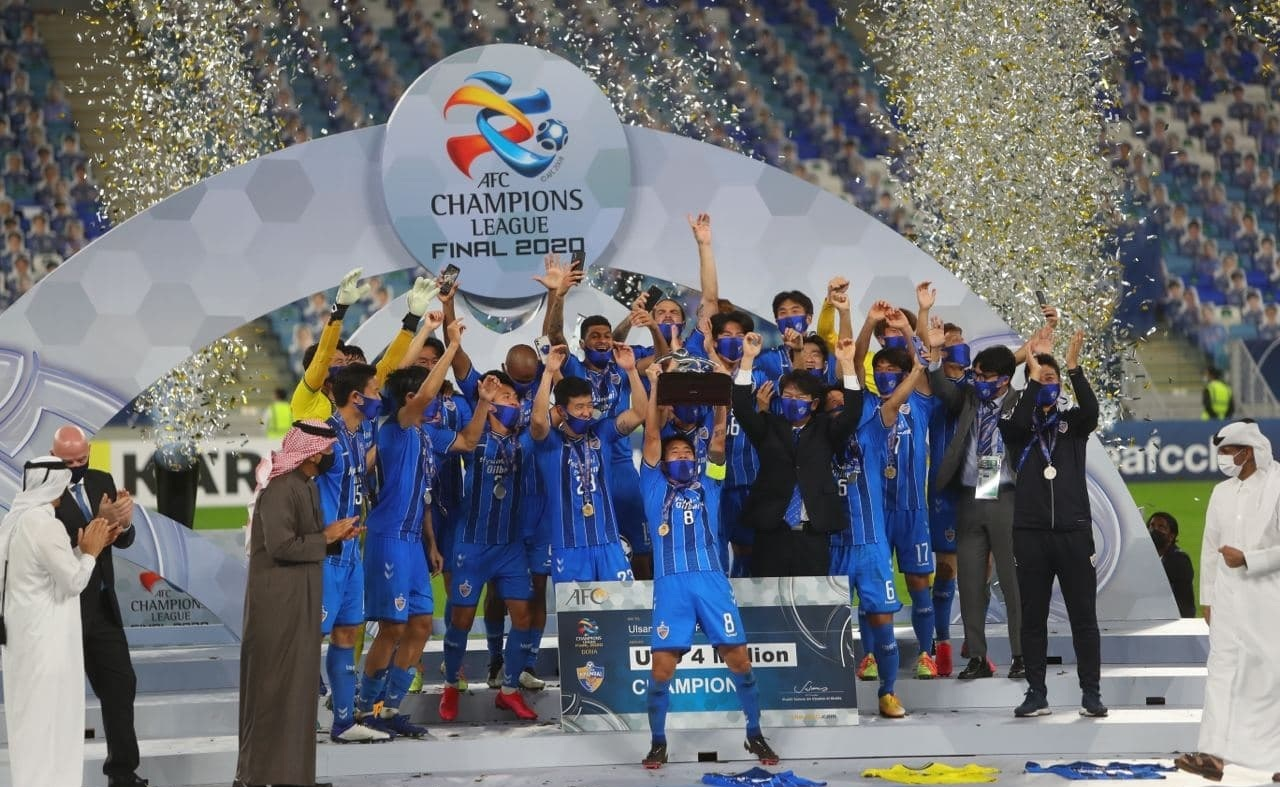
- The Ulsan Hyundai team lifting the 2020 AFC Champions League trophy
- Event: 2020 AFC Champions League
Persepolis	Ulsan Hyundai
1	2
- Date: 19 December 2020
- Venue: Al Janoub Stadium, Al Wakrah
- Man of the Match: Sin Jin-ho (Ulsan Hyundai)
- Referee: Abdulrahman Al-Jassim (Qatar)
- Attendance: 8,517
- Weather: Mostly cloudy 24 °C (75 °F)

The 2020 AFC Champions League final was the final of the 2020 AFC Champions League, the 39th edition of the top-level Asian club football tournament organized by the Asian Football Confederation (AFC), and the 18th under the AFC Champions League title.

The final was contested as a single match between Persepolis from Iran and Ulsan Hyundai from South Korea. Under the original format and schedule, the final would have been contested in two-legged home-and-away format, with the first leg played on 22 November and the second leg on 28 November 2020. However, due to the COVID-19 pandemic, the tournament was suspended between March and September 2020, and upon its resumption, all matches were relocated to centralised venues in Qatar, and the final was played at Al Janoub Stadium in Al Wakrah on 19 December 2020.

Ulsan Hyundai won their second AFC Champions League title. As Asian champions, they qualified for the 2020 FIFA Club World Cup in Qatar.

== Teams ==
In the following table, the finals until 2002 were in the Asian Club Championship era, and since 2003 in the AFC Champions League era.

Team	Region	Previous finals appearances (bold indicates winners)
(Iran) Persepolis	West Region (Zone: CAFA)	1 (2018)
(South Korea) Ulsan Hyundai	East Region (Zone: EAFF)	1 (**2012**)

== Venue ==
Al Janoub Stadium in Al Wakrah, Qatar, hosted the final.

On 16 October 2020, the AFC announced that the final would be played in Doha, Qatar. This was the first Asian club competition final held at Al Janoub Stadium.

On 18 December 2020, the AFC announced that they had agreed with the Qatar Football Association to allow a limited number of fans to attend the match, which was the first match since restart of the tournament to have spectators.

== Road to the final ==
Note: In all results below, the score of the finalist is given first (H: home; A: away; *: played in Qatar after restart).

(Iran) Persepolis		Round	(South Korea) Ulsan Hyundai	
Opponent	Result	Group stage	Opponent	Result
(Qatar) Al-Duhail	0–2 (A)	Matchday 1	(Japan) FC Tokyo	1–1 (H)
(United Arab Emirates) Sharjah	2–2 (A)	Matchday 2	(China) Shanghai Shenhua	3–1 (*)
(Saudi Arabia) Al-Taawoun	1–0 (*)	Matchday 3	(Australia) Perth Glory	2–1 (*)
(Saudi Arabia) Al-Taawoun	1–0 (*)	Matchday 4	(Australia) Perth Glory	2–0 (*)
(Qatar) Al-Duhail	0–1 (*)	Matchday 5	(Japan) FC Tokyo	2–1 (*)
(United Arab Emirates) Sharjah	4–0 (*)	Matchday 6	(China) Shanghai Shenhua	4–1 (*)
**Group C winners**: Pos / Team / Pld / Pts; **1** / (Iran) Persepolis / **6** / **10**; 2 / (Saudi Arabia) Al-Taawoun / 6 / **9**; 3 / (Qatar) Al-Duhail / 6 / **9**; 4 / (United Arab Emirates) Sharjah / 6 / **7**; Source: AFC		Final standings	**Group F winners**: Pos / Team / Pld / Pts; **1** / (South Korea) Ulsan Hyundai / **6** / **16**; 2 / (Japan) FC Tokyo / 6 / **10**; 3 / (China) Shanghai Shenhua / 6 / **7**; 4 / (Australia) Perth Glory / 6 / **1**; Source: AFC	
Opponent	Result	Knockout stage	Opponent	Result
(Qatar) Al-Sadd	1–0 (*)	Round of 16	(Australia) Melbourne Victory	3–0 (*)
(Uzbekistan) Pakhtakor	2–0 (*)	Quarter-finals	(China) Beijing FC	2–0 (*)
(Saudi Arabia) Al-Nassr	1–1 (a.e.t.) (5–3 p) (*)	Semi-finals	(Japan) Vissel Kobe	2–1 (a.e.t.) (*)

== Format ==
The final was played as a single match. If tied after regulation time, extra time and, if necessary, a penalty shoot-out would have been used to decide the winning team.

== Match ==
19 December 2020
15:00 UTC+3

Persepolis (Iran)	1–2	(South Korea) Ulsan Hyundai
Abdi 45'	Live Report; Stats Report	Júnior 45+4', 55' (pen.)

Al Janoub Stadium, Al Wakrah
Attendance: 8,517
Referee: Abdulrahman Al-Jassim (Qatar)

**Persepolis**	**Ulsan Hyundai**

GK	81	(Iran) Hamed Lak
RB	17	(Iran) Mehdi Shiri	(substituted off) 74'
CB	6	(Iran) Hossein Kanaanizadegan
CB	4	(Iran) Jalal Hosseini (c)
LB	77	(Iran) Saeid Aghaei
CM	66	(Iran) Milad Sarlak
CM	8	(Iran) Ahmad Nourollahi
RW	88	(Iran) Siamak Nemati
AM	5	(Iraq) Bashar Resan
LW	2	(Iran) Omid Alishah	(substituted off) 90'
CF	16	(Iran) Mehdi Abdi
Substitutes:
GK	34	(Iran) Amir Mohammad Yousefi
GK	44	(Croatia) Božidar Radošević
DF	15	(Iran) Mohammad Ansari
DF	38	(Iran) Ehsan Hosseini
MF	11	(Iran) Kamal Kamyabinia
MF	23	(Iran) Ali Shojaei	(substituted on) 90'
MF	26	(Iran) Saeid Hosseinpour
FW	25	(Iran) Aria Barzegar
FW	36	(Iran) Arman Ramezani	(substituted on) 74'
Manager:
(Iran) Yahya Golmohammadi

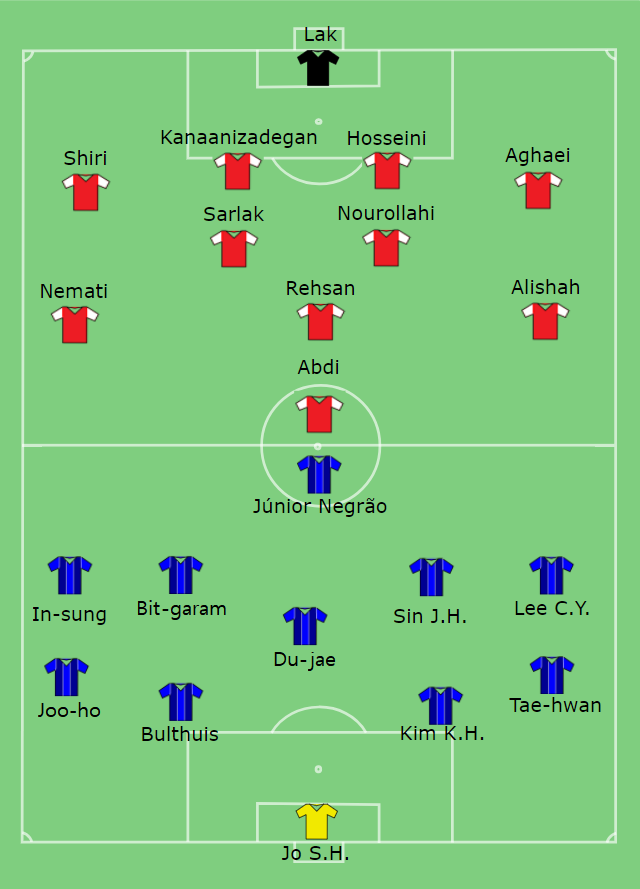

GK	1	(South Korea) Jo Su-huk
RB	23	(South Korea) Kim Tae-hwan
CB	44	(South Korea) Kim Kee-hee
CB	4	(Netherlands) Dave Bulthuis	(yellow card) 79'
LB	6	(South Korea) Park Joo-ho		(substituted off) 72'
DM	16	(South Korea) Won Du-jae
RM	72	(South Korea) Lee Chung-yong		(substituted off) 72'
CM	10	(South Korea) Yoon Bit-garam
CM	8	(South Korea) Sin Jin-ho (c)		(substituted off) 83'
LM	7	(South Korea) Kim In-sung		(substituted off) 90+1'
CF	9	(Brazil) Júnior Negrão	(yellow card) 82'	(substituted off) 83'
Substitutes:
GK	25	(South Korea) Seo Ju-hwan
DF	2	(South Korea) Jeong Dong-ho
DF	15	(South Korea) Jung Seung-hyun		(substituted on) 83'
DF	66	(South Korea) Seol Young-woo		(substituted on) 90+1'
DF	77	(South Korea) Hong Chul		(substituted on) 72'
MF	22	(South Korea) Koh Myong-jin
MF	17	(South Korea) Kim Sung-joon
MF	98	(South Korea) Lee Sang-heon
FW	11	(South Korea) Lee Keun-ho		(substituted on) 72'
FW	19	(Norway) Bjørn Maars Johnsen		(substituted on) 83'
Manager:
(South Korea) Kim Do-hoon

Man of the Match:

Assistant referees:
Ramzan Al-Naemi (Qatar)
Saud Al-Maqaleh (Qatar)
Fourth official:
Hettikamkanamge Perera (Sri Lanka)
Fifth official:
Mohd Yusri Muhamad (Malaysia)
Video assistant referee:
Khamis Al-Marri (Qatar)
Assistant video assistant referees:
Adham Makhadmeh (Jordan)
Mohd Amirul Izwan Yaacob (Malaysia)

**Match rules**

- 90 minutes.
- 30 minutes of extra time if tied.
- Penalty shoot-out if still tied after extra time.
- Ten named substitutes, of which up to five may be used, with a sixth allowed in extra time. (Note: Each team was only given three opportunities to make substitutions, with a fourth opportunity in extra time, excluding substitutions made at half-time, before the start of extra time and at half-time in extra time.)
