= Mehdi Abdi =

Iranian association footballer

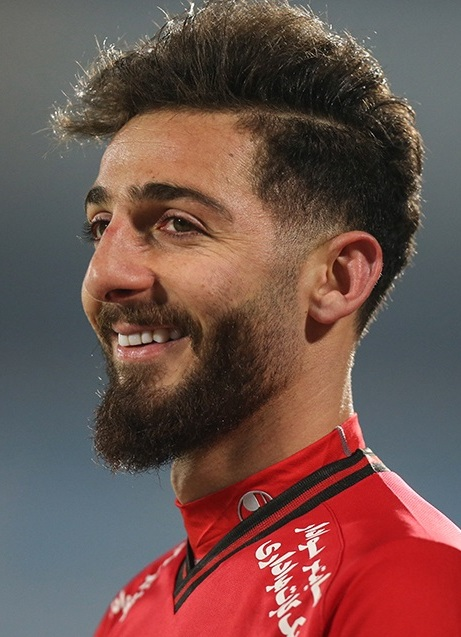
- Abdi with Persepolis in 2021

Personal information
- Full name: Mehdi Abdi Ghara
- Date of birth: 30 November 1998 (age 27)
- Place of birth: Qaem Shahr, Iran
- Height: 1.82 m (6 ft 0 in)
- Position: Striker

Team information
- Current team: Kheybar Khorramabad
- Number: 16

Youth career
- 2015–2017: Persepolis Qaem Shahr
- 2017–2018: Persepolis Academy

Senior career*
Years	Team	Apps	(Gls)
2018–2024	Persepolis	84	(21)
2018–2019	→ Baadraan (loan)	4	(0)
2023–2024	→ Tractor (loan)	20	(6)
2024–2026	Tractor	2	(0)
2024–2026	→ Malavan (loan)	13	(2)
2026–	Kheybar Khorramabad	3	(0)
- * Club domestic league appearances and goals as of 18 April 2025

Mehdi Abdi Ghara (Persian: مهدی عبدی قرا; born 30 November 1998) is an Iranian professional footballer who plays as a forward for Persian Gulf Pro League club Kheybar Khorramabad.

== Personal life ==
Mehdi Abdi was born on 30 November 1998 in Qara Kheyl, Qaem Shahr County, Mazandaran Province.

== Club career ==
=== Persepolis ===
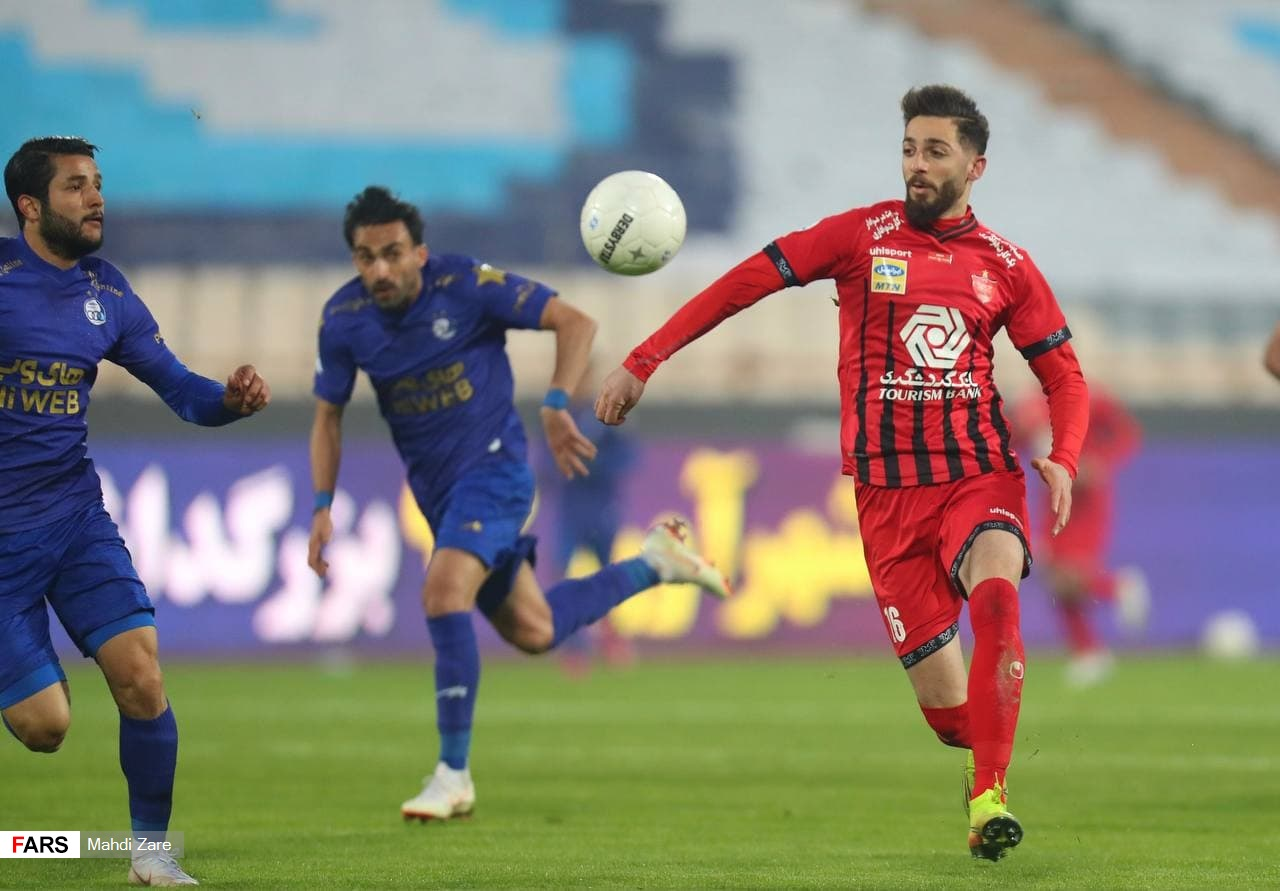
Abdi (in Red) playing for Persepolis in Tehran derby in 2021

He scored his first and second goals in the game between Persepolis and Peykan in the 22nd week of the Pro League. He scored his third goal in the game against Naft Masjed Soleyman in the 26th week of the 19th league, in which Persepolis won the fastest championship in the Pro League. In the AFC Champions League semi-finals, AFC unexpectedly banned Issa Alekasir from all sporting activities. According to Yahya Golmohammadi's decision to include Mehdi Abdi in the AFC Champions League semi-final match against Al-Nassr, he placed Mehdi Abdi in the starting lineup and he opened the gate of Al-Nassr with a header, causing Persepolis to reach the AFC Champions League final.

In the 2018 season, he became the top scorer of the Tehran Youths Competition with 24 goals. He also has 14 assists in his record. He scored the first goal of the match against Ulsan Hyundai FC in the 2020 AFC Champions League Final.

== Career statistics ==
As of 6 May 2024

Club	Division	Season	League		Hazfi Cup		Asia		Other		Total	
Club	Division	Season	Apps	Goals	Apps	Goals	Apps	Goals	Apps	Goals	Apps	Goals
Persepolis	Pro League	2019–20	15	4	3	0	0	0	0	0	18	4
Persepolis	Pro League	2020–21	27	9	3	2	10	3	1	0	41	14
Persepolis	Pro League	2021–22	26	7	3	2	2	0	1	0	32	9
Persepolis	Pro League	2022–23	16	1	3	0	—		—		19	1
Persepolis	Total		84	21	12	4	12	3	2	0	110	28
Baadraan (loan)	Azadegan League	2018–19	4	0	0	0	—		—		4	0
Tractor (loan)	Pro League	2023–24	20	6	2	0	0	0	—		22	6
Tractor (loan)	Total		20	6	2	0	0	0	—		22	6
Tractor	Pro League	2024–25	0	0	0	0	0	0	—		0	0
Tractor	Total		0	0	0	0	0	0	—		0	0
Career totals			108	27	14	4	12	3	2	0	136	34

== Honours ==
Persepolis

- Persian Gulf Pro League (3): 2019–20, 2020–21, 2022–23
- Hazfi Cup (1): 2022–23
- Iranian Super Cup (2): 2020, 2023; Runner-up (1): 2021
- AFC Champions League Runner-up (1): 2020
