= Amir Mohammad Yousefi =

Iranian association footballer

Personal information
- Full name: Amir Mohammad Yousefi
- Date of birth: February 24, 2000 (age 26)
- Place of birth: Khalil Shahr, Iran
- Height: 1.96 m (6 ft 5 in)
- Position: Goalkeeper

Team information
- Current team: Persepolis
- Number: 34

Youth career
- 2017: Esteghlal academy
- 2017–2019: Persepolis U19
- 2019–2020: Persepolis U21

Senior career*
Years	Team	Apps	(Gls)
2020–2022	Persepolis	0	(0)
2022–	→Fajr Sepasi(loan)	0	(0)
- * Club domestic league appearances and goals

Amir Mohammad Yousefi (Persian: امیر محمد یوسفی گل‌خواه; born 24 February 2000) is an Iranian professional footballer who plays as a goalkeeper for the Persian Gulf Pro League club Persepolis.

== Club career ==
After playing in Esteghlal under-19 club, he joined Persepolis under-19 team and then Persepolis under-21 team, and finally joined Persepolis as his first team in Iran's senior league.

=== Persepolis ===
In the first season of his presence in Persepolis with the presence of Alireza Beiranvand, the prominent goalkeeper of the Iranian national team, and in the following seasons with the presence of Hamed Lak, Ahmad Gohari and Božidar Radošević, he did not have the opportunity to play officially for Persepolis.

=== Fajr Sepasi ===
On 24 July 2022, Rafiei signed a two-year contract with Fajr Sepasi.

== Career statistics ==
As of 29 May 2022

Club	Division	Season	League		Hazfi Cup		Asia		Other		Total	
Club	Division	Season	Apps	Goals	Apps	Goals	Apps	Goals	Apps	Goals	Apps	Goals
Persepolis	Pro League	2020–21	0	0	0	0	0	0	0	0	0	0
Persepolis	Pro League	2021–22	0	0	0	0	0	0	0	0	0	0
Persepolis	Pro League	2022–23	0	0	0	0	0	0	0	0	0	0
Persepolis	Total		0	0	0	0	0	0	0	0	0	0
Career Totals			0	0	0	0	0	0	0	0	0	0

== Honours ==
Persepolis

- Persian Gulf Pro League (1):2020–21 Runner-Up (1):2021–22
- Iranian Super Cup (1): 2020; Runner-up (1): 2021
- AFC Champions League Runner-up (1): 2020
