= 2022 Hazfi Cup final =

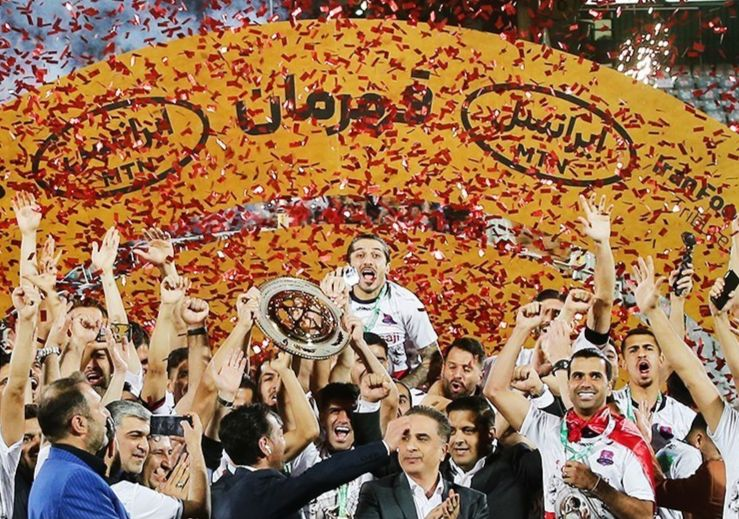
- celebration of Nassaji team
- Event: 2021–22 Hazfi Cup
Nassaji Mazandaran	Aluminium Arak
1	0
- Date: 27 April 2022
- Venue: Azadi Stadium, Tehran
- Referee: Mohammad Hossein Zahedifard
- Attendance: 50,000

2022 Hazfi Cup final was the final match of the 35th edition of Hazfi Cup that was held between Nassaji Mazandaran and Aluminium Arak at Azadi Stadium in Tehran on 27 April 2022.

Originally, the final was planned to be held at Yadegar-e Emam Stadium in Tabriz on above date. However, the protest of the two clubs due to the distance between Qaemshahr and Arak to Tabriz caused the decision of the league organization to be changed. After the official and written protest of the two clubs of Arak and Mazandaran, these protests were examined by the Iran Football League Organization (by order of the Minister Hamid Sajjadi) and they announced that their request for holding the final match in Azadi Stadium has been accepted.

Nassaji Mazandaran defeated Aluminium Arak 1–0 to celebrate the first championship in the history of their club and also Hazfi Cup.

== Teams ==
Team	City	Previous finals appearances
Nassaji Mazandaran	Qaemshahr	Debut
Aluminium Arak	Arak	Debut

== Route to the final ==
=== Aluminium Arak ===
Round	Opposition	Score
Round of 32	Fajr Sepasi (H)	2-0 (a.e.t.)
Round of 16	Sepahan (H)	1-1 (a.e.t.) (4-3 p)
Quarter Final	Persepolis (A)	3-2
Semi-Final	Khalij Fars Mahshahr (H)	1-0
Key: (H) = Home venue; (A) = Away venue; (N) = Neutral venue

As a Persian Gulf Pro League, Aluminium entered the competition from Round of 32.

They beat Fajr Sepasi at home in the fourth round.

They beat Sepahan at home in the fifth round.

They beat Persepolis away in the quarter-final.

They beat Khalij Fars Mahshahr at home in the semi-final.

=== Nassaji Mazandaran ===
Round	Opposition	Score
Round of 32	Arman Gohar (A)	1-0
Round of 16	Gol Gohar (H)	3-1
Quarter Final	Esteghlal (A)	0-0 (a.e.t.) (5-4 p)
Semi-Final	Mes Kerman (H)	1-0 (a.e.t.)
Key: (H) = Home venue; (A) = Away venue; (N) = Neutral venue

As a Persian Gulf Pro League, Nassaji entered the competition from Round of 32.

They beat Arman Gohar Sirjan at Imam Ali Stadium (away) in the fourth round.

They beat Gol Gohar at home in the fifth round.

They beat Esteghlal Tehran at away in the quarter-final.

They beat Mes Kerman home in the semi-final.

== Details ==
27 April 2022
20:30
final

Nassaji Mazandaran	1–0	Aluminium Arak
Abdi 58'	Report

Azadi Stadium, Tehran
Attendance: 50,000
Referee: Mohammad Hossein Zahedifard

Referee:
(Iran) Mohammad Hossein Zahedifard
Assistant Referees:
(Iran) Hadi Toosi
(Iran) Ali Ahmadi
Additional AR:
(Iran)
Fourth official:
(Iran) Morteza Mansourian

Match rules:

- 90 minutes
- 30 minutes of extra-time if necessary
- Penalty shoot-out if scores still level
- Eleven named substitutes
- Maximum of five substitutions in normal time and another substitution in extra time

== See also ==
- 2021–22 Persian Gulf Pro League
- 2021–22 Azadegan League
- 2021–22 Hazfi Cup
- 2022 Iranian Super Cup
