= Milad Sarlak =

Iranian footballer

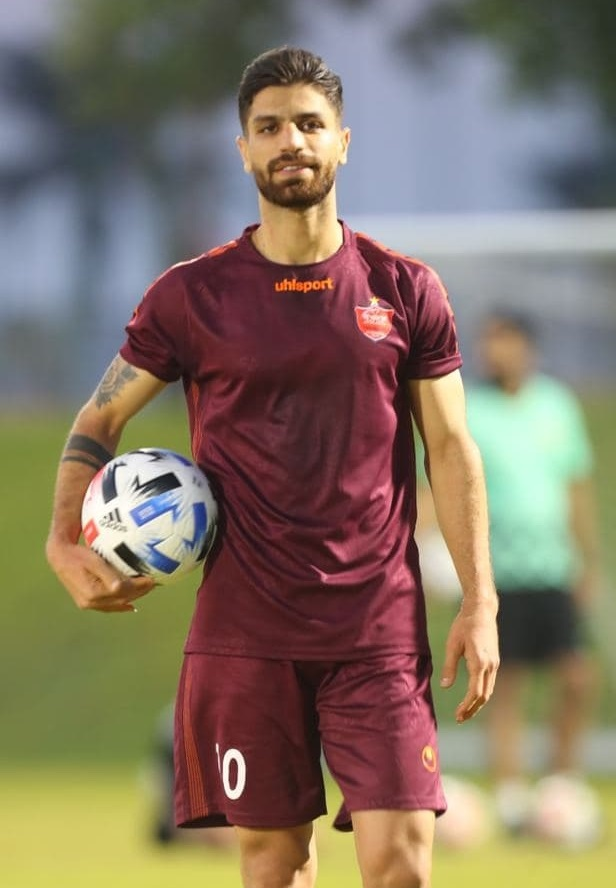
- Sarlak with training Persepolis in 2020

Personal information
- Full name: Milad Sarlak
- Date of birth: 26 March 1995 (age 31)
- Place of birth: Isfahan, Iran
- Height: 1.81 m (5 ft 11 in)
- Position: Midfielder

Team information
- Current team: Foolad
- Number: 8

Youth career
- 2010–2014: Sepahan

Senior career*
Years	Team	Apps	(Gls)
2014–2019	Sepahan	73	(2)
2019	Nassaji	12	(0)
2019–2020	Shahr Khodro	13	(0)
2020–2026	Persepolis	123	(6)
2024	→ Malavan (loan)	6	(0)
2026–	Foolad	6	(0)

International career^{‡}
2012–2014	Iran U20	8	(2)
2017-2019	Iran U23	2	(0)
2021–2023	Iran	13	(0)
- * Club domestic league appearances and goals as of 20 February 2026 ‡ National team caps and goals as of 12 September 2023

Milad Sarlak (Persian: میلاد سرلک; born 26 March 1995) is an Iranian professional footballer who plays as a defensive midfielder for Persian Gulf Pro League club Foolad and the Iran national team.

== Club career ==
=== Sepahan ===
Born in Isfahan, Sarlak joined the academy of Sepahan in 2010. He was promoted to the first team in 2014 and made his professional debut on 10 December 2014, at the age of 19, in a 4–1 win against Gostaresh Foolad. Sarlak became a regular member of the starting 11 in the 2016–17 season.

Sarlak scored his first professional goal on 2 February 2017 in a 3–2 loss to Paykan.

=== Persepolis ===
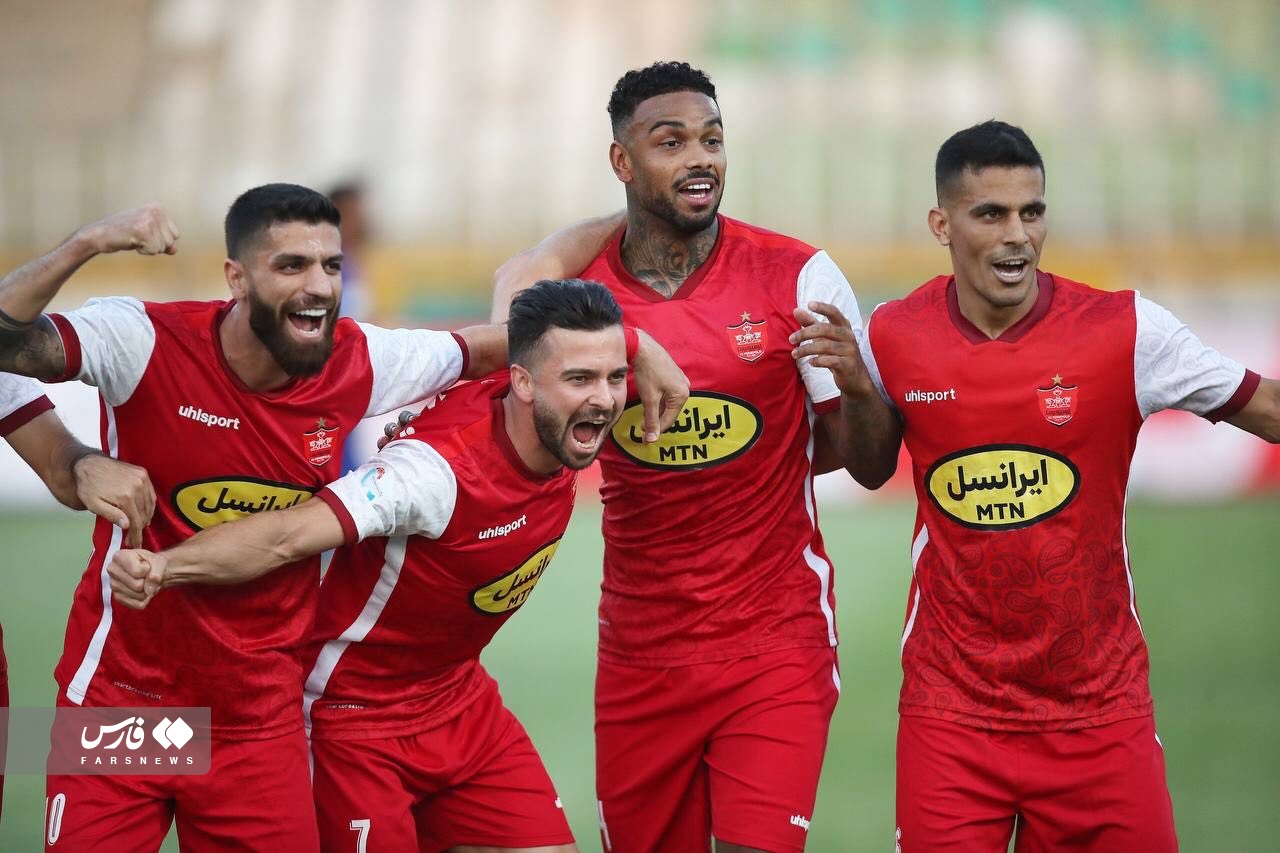
Sarlak (left) in a match against Havadar in 2022

On 5 September 2020, Sarlak signed a two-year contract with Persian Gulf Pro League champions Persepolis.

== International career ==
He made his debut on 11 June 2021 against Cambodia.

== Personal life ==
During the Mahsa Amini protests, Sarlak supported fellow footballer Amir Reza Nasr Azadani, who was jailed as a result of the protests, by posting a picture of the latter with calls for the authorities to not execute Azadani.

On 31 January 2026, Sarlak announced that his brother had been arrested during the 2025–2026 Iranian protests. On 9 February he publicly objected to being included on a list of supporters of the 1979 Islamic Revolution by the Ministry of Sport and Youth, ahead of the Revolution's anniversary.

== Club career statistics ==
As of 26 June 2026

Season	Club	League	Apps	Goals	Apps	Goals	Apps	Goals	Apps	Goals	Apps	Goals
Iran			League		Hazfi Cup		Asia		Other		Total	
2014–15	Sepahan	Pro League	6	0	0	0	0	0	—		6	0
2015–16	Sepahan	Pro League	10	0	0	0	0	0	—		10	0
2016–17	Sepahan	Pro League	28	1	4	0	4	0	—		36	1
2017–18	Sepahan	Pro League	25	1	1	0	0	0	—		26	1
2018–19	Sepahan	Pro League	4	0	2	0	—		—		6	0
Total			73	2	7	0	4	0	—		84	2
2019–20	Nassaji	Pro League	12	0	1	0	—		—		13	0
2019–20	Shahr Khodro	Pro League	13	0	0	0	4	0	—		17	0
Total			25	0	1	0	4	0	—		30	0
2020–21	Persepolis	Pro League	29	2	3	0	13	0	1	0	46	2
2021–22	Persepolis	Pro League	27	1	3	0	2	0	0	0	32	1
2022–23	Persepolis	Pro League	26	2	5	0	—		—		31	2
2023–24	Persepolis	Pro League	12	0	0	0	4	0	—		16	0
2024–25	Persepolis	Pro League	15	1	0	0	2	0	1	0	18	1
2025–26	Persepolis	Pro League	14	0	1	0	—		1	0	16	0
Total			123	6	12	0	21	0	3	0	159	6
2023–24	Malavan (loan)	Pro League	6	0	2	0	—		—		8	0
Career total			227	8	22	0	29	0	3	0	281	8

=== International ===
As of 12 September 2023

Iran
Year	Apps	Goals
2021	6	0
2022	5	0
2023	2	0
Total	13	0

== Honours ==
=== Club ===
Sepahan

- Persian Gulf Pro League (1): 2014–15

Persepolis

- Persian Gulf Pro League (2): 2020–21, 2022–23
- Hazfi Cup (1): 2022–23
- Iranian Super Cup (1): 2020; Runner-up: 2021
- AFC Champions League Runner-up: 2020
