= Alireza Khodaei =

Iranian footballer

Personal information
- Date of birth: 2 March 2000 (age 26)
- Place of birth: Iran
- Height: 1.75 m (5 ft 9 in)
- Positions: Winger; right-back

Team information
- Current team: Persepolis

Youth career
- –2015: Persepolis
- 2015: Nirooye Zamini
- 2015–2019: Persepolis

Senior career*
Years	Team	Apps	(Gls)
2019–	Persepolis	1	(0)
2019–2021	→ Nirooye Zamini (loan)		
2022	→ Saipa (loan)	15	(2)

International career^{‡}
2022–	Iran U-23	3	(0)
- * Club domestic league appearances and goals as of Jun 8, 2022 ‡ National team caps and goals as of Jun 8, 2022

Alireza Khodaei (born 2 March 2, 2000) is an Iranian footballer who plays as a winger for Persepolis in the Pro League.

== Club career ==
Khodaei started his football career at the age of 13 at Persepolis Academy.

=== Nirooye Zamini ===
Khodaei joined Nirooye Zamini after several years in Persepolis in order to do his mandatory military service. After finishing his service, he returned to Persepolis team.

=== Persepolis ===
After returning to Persepolis in 2021, Khodaei was promoted to the first team and débuted in a Hazfi cup game against Shahin Bandar Ameri, where he came on as a substitute for Ehsan Pahlavan in the 88th minute.

=== Saipa ===
In 2021, Khodaei on loan to Saipa.

== International career ==
Iran U-23

In 2022, Khodaei was called up to the Iran under-23 team, and was first capped as a starter in a friendly against Iraq's under-23 team.

== Career statistics ==
=== Club ===
As of June 10, 2022

Club	Division	Season	League		Hazfi Cup		Asia		Super Cup		Total	
Club	Division	Season	Apps	Goals	Apps	Goals	Apps	Goals	Apps	Goals	Apps	Goals
Nirooye Zamini (loan)	League 2	2018–19					—		—			
Nirooye Zamini (loan)	League 2	2019–20					—		—			
Nirooye Zamini (loan)	Total						—		—			
Persepolis	Pro League	2020–21	0	0	1	0	0	0	0	0	1	0
Persepolis	Pro League	2022–23	0	0	0	0	0	0	0	0	0	0
Persepolis	Total		0	0	1	0	0	0	0	0	1	0
Saipa (loan)	Azadegan League	2021–22	15	2	0	0	—		—		15	2
Saipa (loan)	Total		15	2	0	0	—		—		15	2
Career Total			15	2	1	0	—		—		16	2

Due to the presence of Nirooye Zamini team in Iran League 2, information about Khodaei games statistics is not available for this team.

=== National team ===
As of June 10, 2022

Team	Years	Apps	Goals
Iran U-23	2022	3	0
Total		3	0

== Honours ==
Persepolis

- Pro League: 2020–21
- Iranian Super Cup: 2020
