= Ali Shojaei (footballer, born 1997) =

Iranian footballer

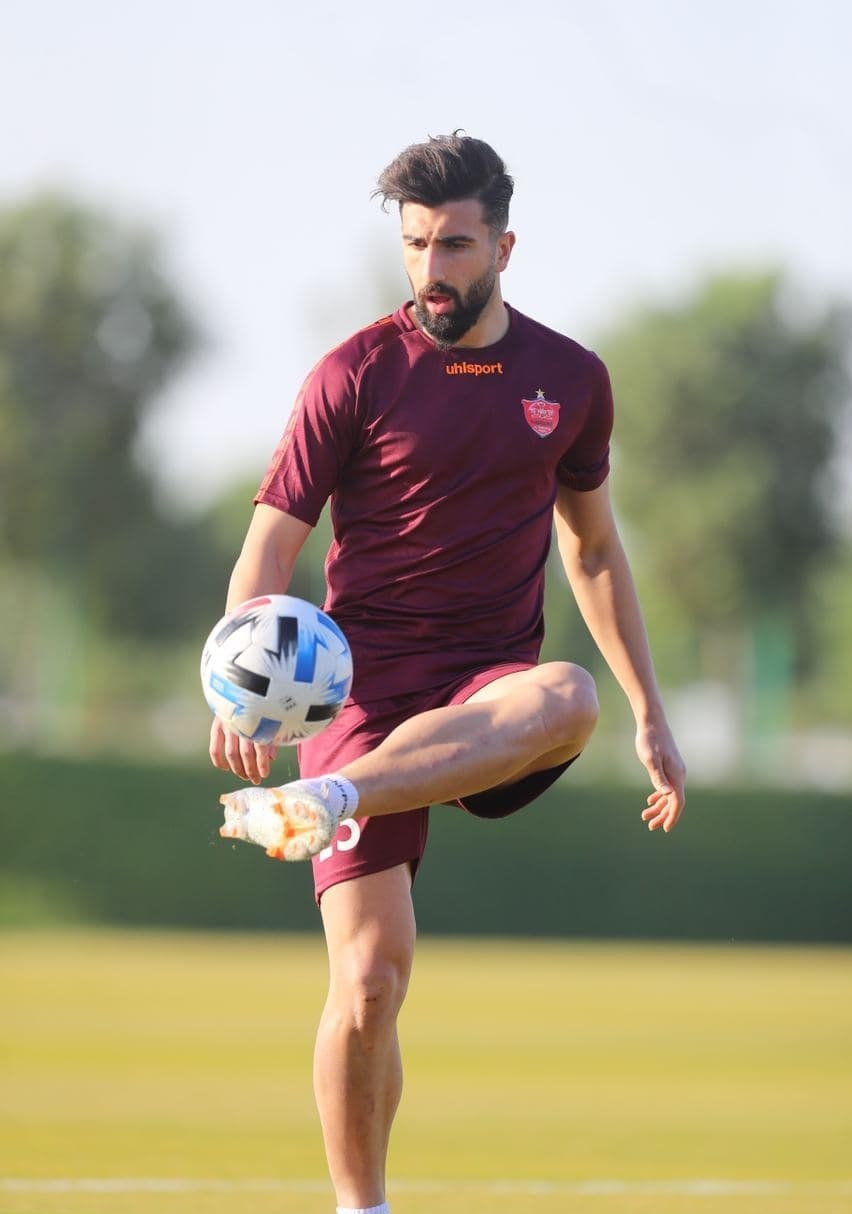

Personal information
- Date of birth: 27 January 1997 (age 29)
- Place of birth: Amol, Iran
- Height: 1.82 m (6 ft 0 in)
- Positions: Left winger; left back

Team information
- Current team: Zob Ahan
- Number: 6

Youth career
- 2009–2014: Saipa

Senior career*
Years	Team	Apps	(Gls)
2015–2018	Saipa	9	(0)
2018–2020	Nassaji	36	(4)
2020–2022	Persepolis	26	(1)
2022–2023	Nassaji	28	(1)
2023–2024	Foolad	23	(0)
2024–2025	Mes Rafsanjan	24	(2)
2025–2026	Kheybar Khorramabad	17	(2)
2026–	Zob Ahan	11	(0)

International career
2009–2013	Iran U17	27	(7)
2014–2017	Iran U20	30	(6)
2017–2020	Iran U23	3	(0)
- * Club domestic league appearances and goals as of 16 April 2025

Ali Shojaei (Persian: علی شجاعی; born 27 January 1997) is an Iranian professional football player who plays as a winger for Persian Gulf Pro League club Zob Ahan.

== Club career ==
=== Saipa ===
He started his career with Saipa youth levels. He promoted to first team by Majid Jalali in winter 2015 and made his debut for Saipa in on October 19, 2015, against Tractor Sazi as a substitute for Ali Zeynali.

=== Persepolis ===
On 8 September 2020, Shojaei signed a two-year contract with Persian Gulf Pro League champions Persepolis.

=== Return to Nassaji Mazandaran ===
on 23 June 2022, Shojaei joined Nassaji on a new one-year deal.

== Club career statistics ==
As of 25 June 2022

Club	Division	Season	League		Hazfi Cup		Asia		Other		Total	
Club	Division	Season	Apps	Goals	Apps	Goals	Apps	Goals	Apps	Goals	Apps	Goals
Saipa	Pro League	2014–15	0	0	0	0	—		_		0	0
Saipa	Pro League	2015–16	2	0	1	0	—		_		3	0
Saipa	Pro League	2016–17	7	1	2	0	—		_		9	1
Saipa	Pro League	2017–18	5	1	1	0	—		_		6	1
Saipa	Total		14	2	4	0	—		_		18	2
Nassaji	Pro League	2018–19	12	1	2	0	—		_		14	1
Nassaji	Pro League	2019–20	24	3	1	0	—		_		25	3
Nassaji	Total		36	4	3	0	—		_		39	4
Persepolis	Pro League	2020–21	11	0	1	0	9	0	1	0	22	0
Persepolis	Pro League	2021–22	15	1	2	1	—		1	0	18	2
Persepolis	Total		26	1	3	1	9	0	2	0	40	2
Nassaji	Persian Gulf Pro League	2022-23	28	1	3	0	0	0	1	0	32	1
Foolad	Persian Gulf Pro League	2023-24	14	0	0	0	0	0	0	0	14	0
Career totals			118	8	13	1	9	0	3	0	143	9

== Honours ==
=== Club ===
Persepolis

- Persian Gulf Pro League (1): 2020–21
- Iranian Super Cup (1): 2020; Runner-up (1): 2021
- AFC Champions League Runner-up (1): 2020
