= Saeid Aghaei =

Iranian football winger

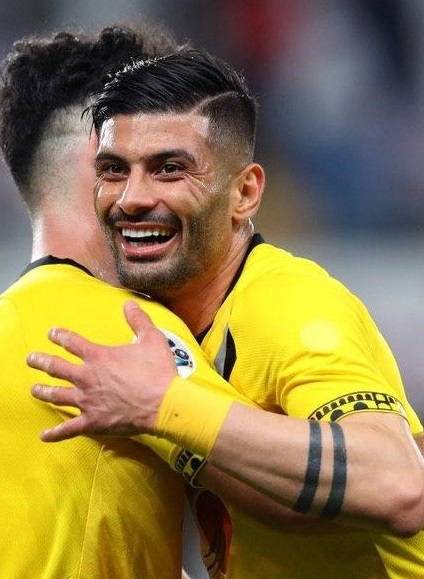
- Aghaei with Sepahan in 2019

Personal information
- Date of birth: 9 February 1995 (age 31)
- Place of birth: Tabriz, Iran
- Height: 1.82 m (5 ft 11 1/2 in)
- Positions: Left back; winger

Team information
- Current team: Be'sat Kermanshah
- Number: 77

Youth career
- 2008–2012: Tractor
- 2012–2013: Gostaresh Foolad
- 2014–2016: Tractor

Senior career*
Years	Team	Apps	(Gls)
2012–2016	Gostaresh Foolad	19	(3)
2013–2016	→ Tractor (loan)	42	(1)
2016–2017	Tractor	21	(0)
2017–2020	Sepahan	75	(1)
2020–2022	Persepolis	52	(0)
2022–2023	Foolad	26	(0)
2023	Tractor	2	(0)
2023–2025	Nassaji Mazandaran	19	(0)
2026–	Be'sat Kermanshah	4	(0)

International career^{‡}
2009–2011	Iran U17		
2013–2015	Iran U20	7	(2)
2017–2021	Iran	5	(0)
- * Club domestic league appearances and goals as of 17 April 2025 ‡ National team caps and goals as of 27 March 2018

Saeid Aghaei (Persian: سعید آقایی; born 9 February 1995) is an Iranian professional footballer who plays as a Left back for Be'sat Kermanshah in Azadegan League.

== Club career ==
=== Gostaresh ===
He started his career with Gostaresh in 2012–13 Azadegan League and helped them to promote to Iran Pro League with scoring 3 times in 15 appearances.

=== Tractor ===
Aghaei started 2013–14 season with Gostaresh. After a few matches, he joined Tractor to spend conscription period.

=== Persepolis ===
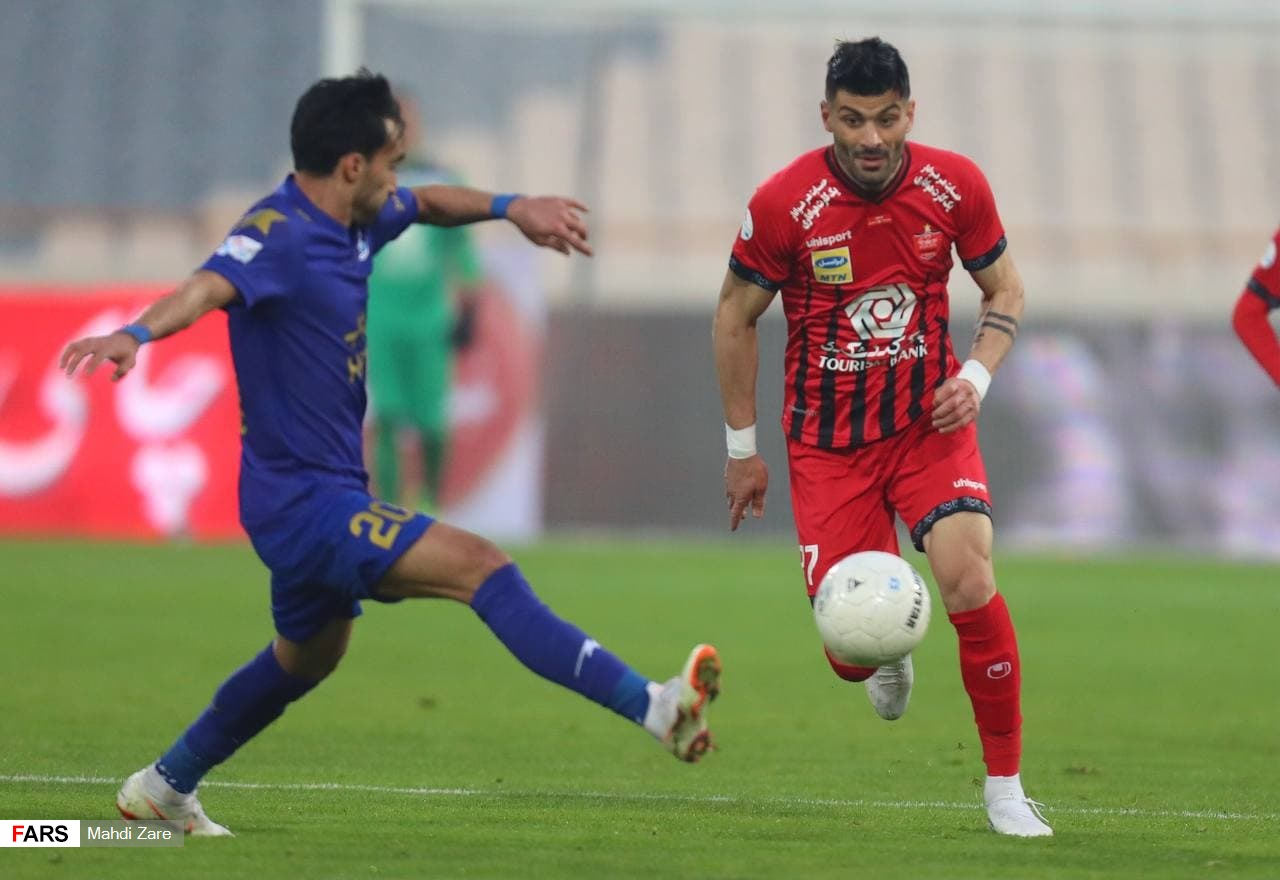
Aghaei playing for Persepolis against Esteghlal in January 2021

On 1 September 2020, Aghaei signed a two-year contract with Persian Gulf Pro League champions Persepolis.

== Club career statistics ==
As of 2 June 2022.

Club	Division	Season	League		Hazfi Cup		Asia		Other		Total	
Club	Division	Season	Apps	Goals	Apps	Goals	Apps	Goals	Apps	Goals	Apps	Goals
Gostaresh; Foulad	Division 1	2012–13	15	3	0	0	—		_		15	3
Gostaresh; Foulad	Pro League	2013–14	4	0	0	0	—		_		4	0
Tractor	Pro League	2013–14	4	0	0	0	2	0	_		6	0
Tractor	Pro League	2014–15	10	0	1	0	0	0	_		11	0
Tractor	Pro League	2015–16	22	1	4	0	4	1	_		30	2
Tractor	Pro League	2016–17	21	0	0	0	0	0	_		21	0
Tractor	Total		76	4	5	0	6	1	_		87	5
Sepahan	Pro League	2017–18	23	0	1	0	0	0	_		23	0
Sepahan	Pro League	2018–19	28	1	4	0	—		_		32	1
Sepahan	Pro League	2019–20	18	2	2	0	2	0	_		22	2
Sepahan	Total		69	3	7	0	2	0	_		77	3
Persepolis	Pro League	2020–21	26	0	3	0	7	0	1	0	37	0
Persepolis	Pro League	2021–22	25	0	3	0	2	0	1	0	31	0
Persepolis	Total		51	0	6	0	9	0	2	0	68	0
Career totals			196	7	17	0	17	1	2	0	232	8

== International career ==
=== U17 ===
He was part of Iran U–17 in 2010 AFC U-16 Championship.

=== U20 ===
He was invited by Ali Dousti Mehr to preparation for 2014 AFC U-19 Championship.

=== Senior ===
Aghaei was called up to the senior Iran squad by Carlos Queiroz for friendlies against Macedonia and Kyrgyzstan in June 2016. He made his senior debut on 4 June 2017 against Montenegro. In May 2018, he was named in Iran's preliminary squad for the 2018 World Cup in Russia but did not make the final 23.

== Honours ==
=== Club ===
Gostaresh Foolad

- Azadegan League (1): 2012–13

Tractor

- Persian Gulf Pro League Runner up (1): 2014–15
- Hazfi Cup (1): 2013–14; Runner-up (1): 2016–17

Persepolis

- Persian Gulf Pro League (1): 2020–21
- Iranian Super Cup (1): 2020; Runner-Up (1): 2021
- AFC Champions League Runner-up (1): 2020

=== Individual ===
- Persian Gulf Pro League Team of the Year (2) : 2015–16, 2016–17
