= Hamed Lak =

Iranian footballer

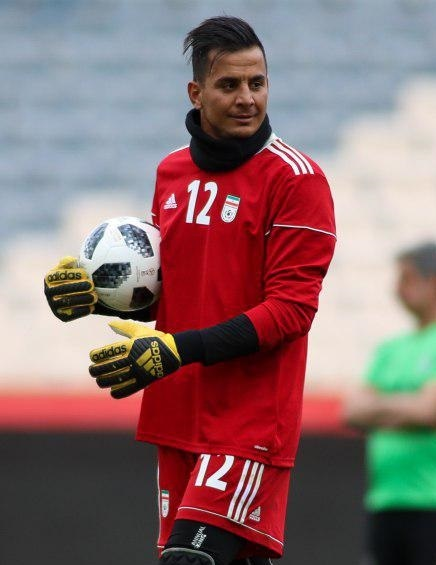
- Lak with Iran in 2018.

Personal information
- Date of birth: 24 November 1990 (age 35)
- Place of birth: Tehran, Iran
- Height: 1.92 m (6 ft 3 1/2 in)
- Position: Goalkeeper

Team information
- Current team: Foolad
- Number: 81

Youth career
- 2008–2010: Saba Qom

Senior career*
Years	Team	Apps	(Gls)
2010–2017	Saba Qom	96	(0)
2013–2015	→ Tractor (loan)	51	(0)
2017	Saipa	14	(0)
2017–2018	Foolad	25	(0)
2018–2019	Nassaji Mazandaran	24	(0)
2019–2020	Machine Sazi	26	(0)
2020–2022	Persepolis	52	(0)
2022–2025	Mes Rafsanjan	75	(0)
2025–	Foolad	32	(0)

International career
2011–2013	Iran U23	4	(0)
2012–2018	Iran	0	(0)
- * Club domestic league appearances and goals as of 20 February 2026

Hamed Lak (Persian: حامد لک, born 24 November 1990) is an Iranian professional footballer who plays as a Goalkeeper for Persian Gulf Pro League club Foolad.

== Club career ==
He is a product of Saba Qom youth academy. He was promoted to the first team squad in summer 2010. He became their number one goalkeeper on 2011–12 season under Abdollah Veisi. In the summer of 2013, he moved to Tractor despite bids from Persepolis and Beşiktaş. In his first year with Tractor, Lak was instrumental in Tractor's success in the Hazfi Cup, going all the way and winning it for the first time in the club's history. In the summer of 2014 Lak extended his contract with Tractor for another two seasons.

=== Persepolis ===
On 1 September 2020, Lak signed a two-year contract with Persian Gulf Pro League champions Persepolis.

== Personal life ==
On 24 January 2026, Lak was summoned by the Football Federation Islamic Republic of Iran for wearing a black armband during a match in solidarity with the 2025–2026 Iranian protests. He had also previously supported the Mahsa Amini protests. On 1 February, Lak openly criticized an IRIB Ofogh comedy segment mocking deceased protesters.

== Career statistics ==
=== Club ===
As of 29 May 2022

Season	Club	League	Apps	Goals	Apps	Goals	Apps	Goals	Apps	Goals	Apps	Goals
Iran			League		Hazfi Cup		Asia		Other		Total	
2010–11	Saba Qom	Pro League	8	0	0	0	0	0	_		8	1
2011–12	Saba Qom	Pro League	27	7	1	0	—		_		28	7
2012–13	Saba Qom	Pro League	23	0	0	0	—		_		23	0
Total			58	0	1	0	—		_		59	0
2013–14	Tractor	Pro League	26	0	0	0	4	0	_		30	0
2014–15	Tractor	Pro League	25	0	2	0	5	0	_		32	0
Total			51	0	2	0	9	0	_		62	0
2015–16	Saba Qom	Pro League	23	0	2	0	—		_		25	0
2016–17	Saba Qom	Pro League	15	0	2	0	—		_		17	0
2016–17	Saipa	Pro League	14	0	0	0	—		_		14	0
2017–18	Foolad	Pro League	25	0	1	0	—		_		26	0
2018–19	Nassaji	Pro League	24	0	2	0	—		_		26	0
2019–20	Machine Sazi	Pro League	30	0	2	0	—		_		32	0
Total			131	0	9	0	—		_		140	0
2020–21	Persepolis	Pro League	29	0	1	0	13	0	1	0	44	0
2021–22	Persepolis	Pro League	22	0	2	0	2	0	1	0	27	0
Total			51	0	3	0	15	0	2	0	71	0
2022-23	Mes Rafsanjan	Persian Gulf Pro League	24	0	1	0	0	0	0	0	25	0
2023-24	Mes Rafsanjan	Persian Gulf Pro League	24	0	3	0	0	0	0	0	27	0
Total			48	0	4	0	0	0	0	0	52	0
Career total			339	0	19	0	24	0	2	0	384	0

== International career ==
He made his first International match for Iran national under-23 football team on June 11, 2011; in a friendly match against Syria U-23, after he was on the bench after Mohammad-Rashid Mazaheri and Saleh Khalil-Azad in 2012 Summer Olympics qualification against Kyrgyzstan.

He made his debut under Carlos Queiroz on 15 December 2012 against Yemen in 2012 WAFF. Lak put up a good performance and Iran won the game 2–1.

Lak was called up again to Team Melli for June 2017 after a long absence.

== Honours ==
=== Club ===
Tractor

- Hazfi Cup (1): 2013–14

Persepolis

- Persian Gulf Pro League (1): 2020–21
- Iranian Super Cup (1): 2020; Runner-Up (1): 2021
- AFC Champions League runner-up (1): 2020
