= Ehsan Hosseini =

Iranian footballer (born 1998)

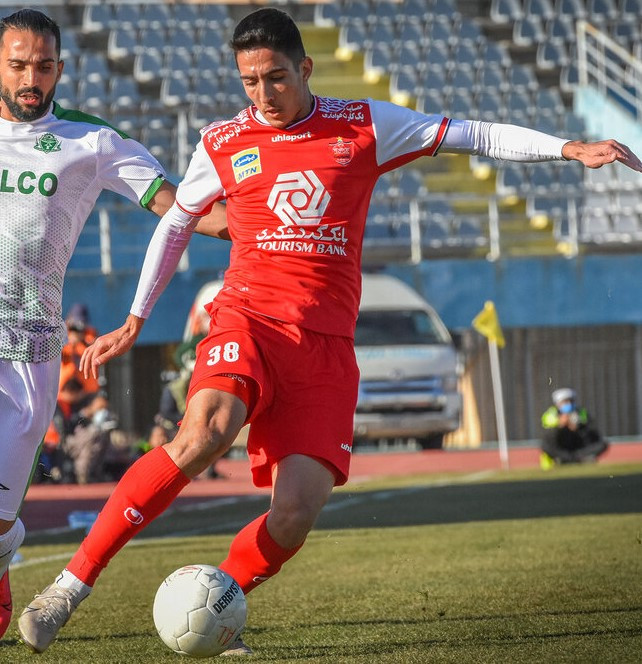

Personal information
- Full name: Seyed Mohammad Ehsan Hosseini
- Date of birth: October 3, 1998 (age 28)
- Place of birth: Tehran, Iran
- Height: 1.85 m (6 ft 1 in)
- Position: Defender

Team information
- Current team: Gol Gohar
- Number: 3

Youth career
- Naft Tehran
- Persepolis

Senior career*
Years	Team	Apps	(Gls)
2017–2022	Persepolis	7	(0)
2021–2022	→ Shahr Khodro (loan)	30	(1)
2022–2023	Aluminium Arak	26	(1)
2023–2024	Nassaji Mazandaran	19	(0)
2024–2026	Kheybar Khorramabad	41	(4)
2026–	Gol Gohar	7	(0)
- * Club domestic league appearances and goals as of 1 March 2021

Seyed Mohammad Ehsan Hosseini (Persian: سید محمد احسان حسینی born October 3, 1998) is an Iranian footballer who plays as a Defender for Gol Gohar in the Persian Gulf Pro League.

== Club career ==
=== Persepolis F.C. ===
Hosseini joined Persepolis in summer 2017 with a contract until 2020.

== Career statistics ==
As of 25 July 2021

Club	Division	Season	League		Hazfi Cup		Asia		Total	
Club	Division	Season	Apps	Goals	Apps	Goals	Apps	Goals	Apps	Goals
Persepolis	Pro League	2017–18	0	0	0	0	0	0	0	0
Persepolis	Pro League	2018–19	4	0	0	0	1	0	5	0
Persepolis	Pro League	2019–20	1	0	0	0	0	0	1	0
Persepolis	Pro League	2020–21	2	0	0	0	0	0	2	0
Persepolis	Total		7	0	0	0	1	0	8	0
Padideh (loan)	Pro League	2020–21	7	1	0	0	—		7	1
Padideh (loan)	Total		7	1	0	0	—		7	1
Career Totals			14	1	0	0	1	0	15	1

== Honours ==
Persepolis

- Persian Gulf Pro League: 2017–18, 2018–19, 2019–20
- Iranian Super Cup: 2018, 2019
- Hazfi Cup: 2018–19
- AFC Champions League runner-up: 2018, 2020
