= Issa Alekasir =

Iranian footballer

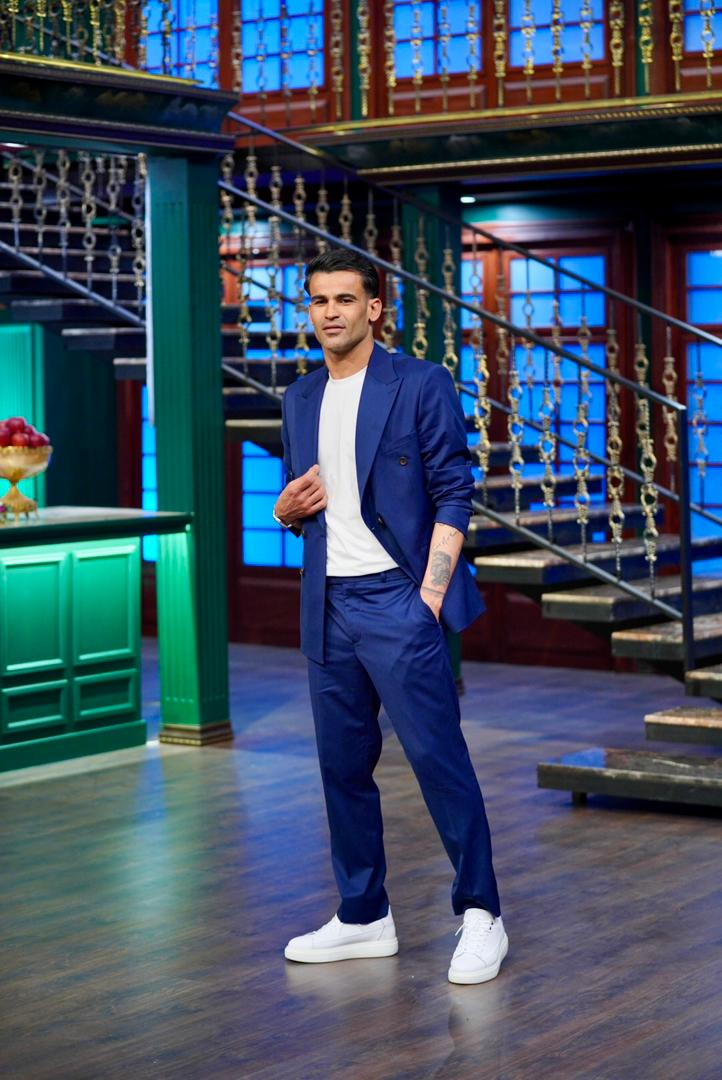
- Alekasir in 2024

Personal information
- Full name: Issa Alekasir Rajabi
- Date of birth: 7 February 1990 (age 36)
- Place of birth: Dezful, Iran
- Height: 1.83 m (6 ft 0 in)
- Position: Striker

Senior career*
| Years | Team | Apps | (Gls) |
| 2011–2012 | Esteghlal Ahvaz | | |
| 2012–2013 | Paykan | 12 | (0) |
| 2013–2014 | Albadr Bandar Kong | 19 | (7) |
| 2014–2015 | Aluminium Hormozgan | 19 | (11) |
| 2015–2018 | Naft Tehran | 63 | (12) |
| 2018–2019 | Paykan | 25 | (8) |
| 2019–2020 | Sanat Naft | 26 | (12) |
| 2020–2023 | Persepolis | 37 | (8) |
| 2023–2024 | Sepahan | 9 | (2) |
| 2024–2025 | Persepolis | 38 | (10) |
| 2025–2026 | Malavan | 4 | (0) |
- * Club domestic league appearances and goals as of 15 May 2025

Issa Alekasir (Persian: عیسی آل‌کثیر, born 7 February 1990) is an Iranian footballer who plays as a striker for Malavan in the Persian Gulf Pro League.

== Club career ==
Alekasir joined Paykan after promoting with Esteghlal Ahvaz to Azadegan League in summer 2012. He spent a poor season with Paykan where he played 12 times without scoring a goal. In summer 2013 he joined Albadr Bandar Kong. After Albadr Bandar Kong's relegation to Iran Football's 2nd Division in 2014, he joined Aluminium Hormozgan. After shining with his new club, he had offers from Foolad and Naft Tehran in mid-season, he tagged a Rls.3 billion (about US$80,000) fee which was declined by both Pro League sides. He finished the season with 11 goals and named as the best goal scorer of 2014–15 Azadegan League.

=== Naft Tehran ===
On 28 June 2015, he joined Naft Tehran with a three-year contract as a free agent.

=== Return to Paykan ===
In June 2018, he rejoined Paykan, where he played for one season.

=== Sanat Naft Abadan ===
Alekasir scored 12 goals in the 2019–20 season with Sanat Naft Abadan.

=== Persepolis ===
On 1 September 2020, Alekasir signed a two-year contract with Persian Gulf Pro League champions Persepolis. On 24 September, he scored his first goal for Persepolis in a 4–0 win over Sharjah in the 2020 AFC Champions League group stage. On 27 September, he scored the winning goal in a 1–0 win over Al Sadd in the Champions League round of 16. On 30 September, he scored two goals in a 2–0 win against Pakhtakor in the Champions League quarter-finals. Afterwards, the AFC suspended Alekasir for 6 months because his goal celebration in the game was ruled to be a "discriminatory gesture".

== Club career statistics ==
As of 15 May 2025

| Club | Division | Season | League | | Hazfi Cup | | Asia | | Other | | Total | |
| Club | Division | Season | Apps | Goals | Apps | Goals | Apps | Goals | Apps | Goals | Apps | Goals |
|---|---|---|---|---|---|---|---|---|---|---|---|---|
| Paykan | Pro League | 2012–13 | 12 | 0 | 1 | 0 | 0 | 0 | — | | 13 | 0 |
| Albadr Bandar Kong | Azadegan League | 2013–14 | 19 | 7 | 2 | 0 | 0 | 0 | — | | 21 | 7 |
| Aluminium Hormozgan | Azadegan League | 2014–15 | 33 | 21 | 2 | 2 | 0 | 0 | — | | 35 | 23 |
| Total | | | 64 | 28 | 5 | 2 | 0 | 0 | — | | 69 | 30 |
| Naft Tehran | Pro League | 2015–16 | 14 | 0 | 2 | 0 | 3 | 0 | 1 | 0 | 20 | 0 |
| Naft Tehran | Pro League | 2016–17 | 22 | 4 | 5 | 3 | 0 | 0 | — | | 27 | 7 |
| Naft Tehran | Pro League | 2017–18 | 27 | 8 | 2 | 1 | 0 | 0 | — | | 29 | 9 |
| Naft Tehran | Total | | 63 | 12 | 9 | 4 | 3 | 0 | 1 | 0 | 76 | 16 |
| Paykan | Pro League | 2018–19 | 25 | 8 | 1 | 0 | 0 | 0 | — | | 26 | 8 |
| Sanat Naft Abadan | Pro League | 2019–20 | 26 | 12 | 2 | 0 | 0 | 0 | — | | 28 | 12 |
| Total | | | 51 | 20 | 3 | 0 | 0 | 0 | — | | 54 | 20 |
| Persepolis | Pro League | 2020–21 | 11 | 3 | 2 | 0 | 12 | 6 | 1 | 1 | 26 | 10 |
| Persepolis | Pro League | 2021–22 | 14 | 4 | 1 | 1 | 2 | 0 | 0 | 0 | 17 | 5 |
| Persepolis | Pro League | 2022–23 | 12 | 1 | 4 | 3 | – | | – | | 16 | 4 |
| Persepolis | Total | | 37 | 8 | 7 | 4 | 14 | 6 | 1 | 1 | 59 | 19 |
| Sepahan | Pro League | 2023–24 | 9 | 2 | 0 | 0 | 3 | 1 | – | | 12 | 3 |
| Sepahan | Total | | 9 | 2 | 0 | 0 | 3 | 1 | – | | 12 | 3 |
| Persepolis | Pro League | 2023–24 | 14 | 7 | 2 | 3 | – | | – | | 16 | 10 |
| Persepolis | Pro League | 2024–25 | 24 | 3 | 2 | 0 | 8 | 0 | 1 | 0 | 35 | 3 |
| Persepolis | Total | | 38 | 10 | 4 | 3 | 8 | 0 | 1 | 0 | 51 | 13 |
| Career Total | | | 262 | 80 | 28 | 15 | 26 | 7 | 3 | 1 | 319 | 103 |

== Honours ==
Esteghlal Ahvaz

- League 2: 2011–12

Naft Tehran

- Hazfi Cup: 2016–17

Persepolis

- Persian Gulf Pro League: 2020–21, 2022–23, 2023–24
- Hazfi Cup: 2022–23
- Iranian Super Cup: 2020, 2023
- AFC Champions League runner-up: 2020

Individual

- Azadegan League Top scorer: 2014–15 (11 goals)
- Hazfi Cup Top scorer: 2015–16 (4 goals)
