= Mohammad Hossein Zahedifard =

Iranian international football referee

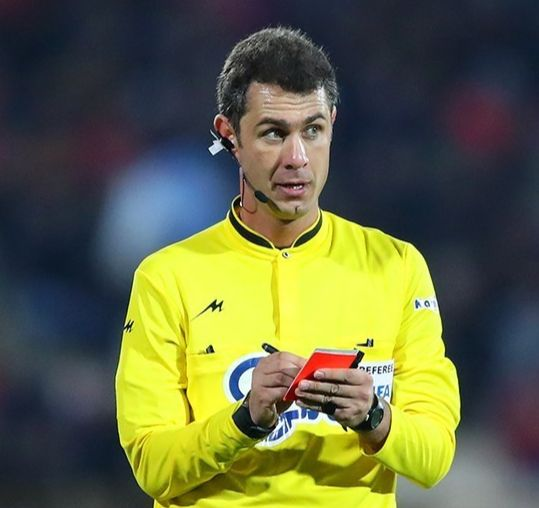
- Zahedifard refereeing Iran League
- Born: 16 August 1985 (age 41); Dashtestan, Iran
- Other occupation: Youth and Sports Department employee

Domestic
Years	League	Role
2000–2008	Azadegan League	Referee
2010–	Persian Gulf Pro League	Referee

Mohammad Hossein Zahedifard (Persian: محمدحسین زاهدی فرد, born 16 August 1985) is an Iranian international football referee who has been officiating in the Persian Gulf Pro League for several seasons and has been on the FIFA list since 2015.

== Early life ==
He was born on 16 August 1985 in Dashtestan, a city near Bushehr. His nickname is Meysam (میثم). He holds a master's degree in Telecommunication Electrical Engineering.

== Matches ==
- FIFA World Cup

== Honors ==
- Iranian Referee of the Year: 2019
