= Božidar Radošević =

Croatian footballer

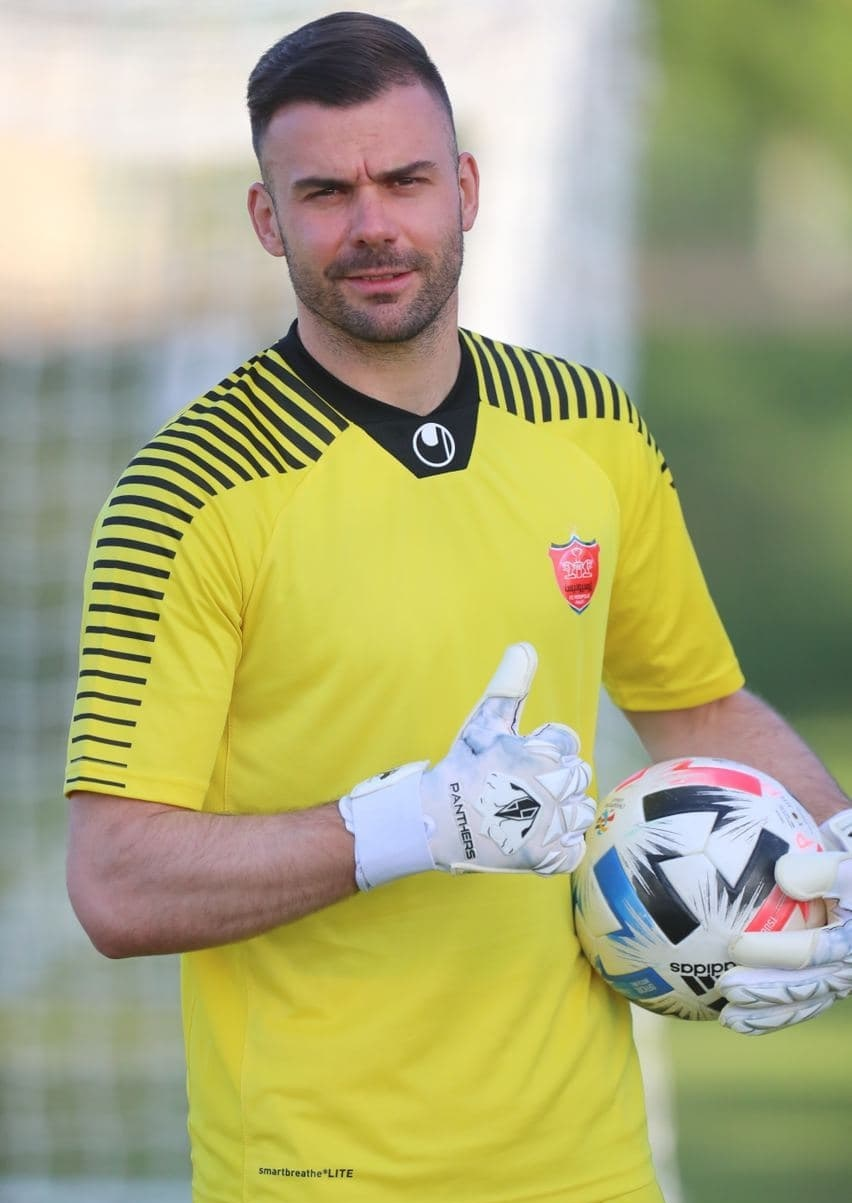

Personal information
- Full name: Božidar Radošević
- Date of birth: 4 April 1989 (age 37)
- Place of birth: Split, SR Croatia, SFR Yugoslavia
- Height: 1.87 m (6 ft 1 1/2 in)
- Position: Goalkeeper

Team information
- Current team: Uskok

Youth career
- Hajduk Split

Senior career*
Years	Team	Apps	(Gls)
2007–2011	Hajduk Split	14	(0)
2007–2008	→ Hrvace (loan)	15	(0)
2008–2009	→ Mosor (loan)	14	(0)
2009	→ Imotski (loan)	13	(0)
2010	→ Željezničar (loan)	1	(0)
2011	Budućnost	4	(0)
2012	Solin	14	(0)
2012–2013	Istra 1961	4	(0)
2013	Šibenik	11	(0)
2013–2014	Inter Zaprešić	36	(0)
2014	Koper	14	(0)
2015	Balmazújváros	15	(0)
2015–2016	Debrecen	32	(0)
2016–2022	Persepolis	43	(0)
2022–2023	Varaždin	3	(0)
2023-2025	Gorica	23	(0)
2025-2026	Solin	28	(0)
2026-	Uskok	1	(0)

International career
2005	Croatia U17	14	(0)
2006	Croatia U19	1	(0)

Managerial career
- 2026-: Uskok (goalkeeper coach)
- * Club domestic league appearances and goals

Božidar Radošević (born 4 April 1989 in Split) better known by the nickname Rado, is a Croatian professional football goalkeeper who plays as a goalkeeper and also works as a goalkeeping coach in Uskok in Druga NL.

== Personal life ==
He is the first of two sons of Ivica Radošević, who was also a goalkeeper and subsequently became a schoolteacher. His mother Zdravka is a lawyer. His younger brother, Dino, graduated from the Faculty of Pharmacy in Sarajevo.

In December 2015, Radošević married his long-time girlfriend, Mirela Buljubašić. In November 2017, they had their first child together, a son named Luciano.

Radošević is fluent in Croatian, English and Persian, and can also communicate on Hungarian.

== Career ==
A product of Hajduk Split academy, Radošević had several loan spells between 2007 and 2010 at lower level Croatian sides and at Željezničar in Bosnia and Herzegovina, before having his league debut for Hajduk in the 2010–11 season on 24 July 2010 against Istra 1961.

In the 2010–2011 season Radošević played in Europa League for Hajduk Split. Radošević debuted in qualifying match against Unirea and also performed in the group stage of competition in matches against AEK Athens and Anderlecht.

Radošević was also capped for Croatia at youth levels, appearing in 15 matches for under-17 and under-19 national teams in 2005 and 2006.

In the 2012 Radošević was the most responsible player for the remaining Solin among Croatian Second League, which brought him a transfer to Istra 1961.

In Istra 1961 Radošević be kept only 8 months and in March 2013 terminated the contract because of debts and disagreements with coach Igor Pamić.

In March 2013 temporarily joins the team Šibenik, where he appeared in 11 games and in June 2013 becomes a free agent.

In July 2013 he signed a contract with Inter Zaprešić.

After a great season in Inter Zaprešić, Radošević goes to Slovenia in Koper.

Radošević is most remembered for his match against Neftchi Baku, which is the best result for Koper in Europa League.

During the season the club was facing the result crisis after the best players left the club. This prompted president Ante Guberac to look for culprits in the players he personally led. From the first team are removing all foreign players led by Radošević. Players were faced with extremely inhumane working conditions and threats by the president Ante Guberac. After a month of work in inhumane conditions, some players have to agree with the club. Radošević has left the club in November 2014 and became a free agent.

In January 2015 Radošević signed a half year contract with Hungarian second division club Balmazújváros with the mission of avoiding the club's relegation. Radošević and five other Croatian players have ensured the second division status for Balmazújváros.

His great form in Hungary have not gone unnoticed by other clubs and in June 2015 signed two years contract with one of the biggest clubs in Hungary Debreceni VSC. He made his debut against Puskás Akadémia in a draw 1-1. In Debreceni VSC Radosevic was a three consecutive times named for the Player of the Month by the fans. He defended a complete season and helped the team to secure third place in the league.

After qualifying matches in Europa League and the failure of Debreceni VSC, he accepted the offer from Iranian club Persepolis and signed a contract for two years. In his new club, he made his debut against Sanat Naft. Persepolis won the game. Radošević enjoys great popularity in Iran.

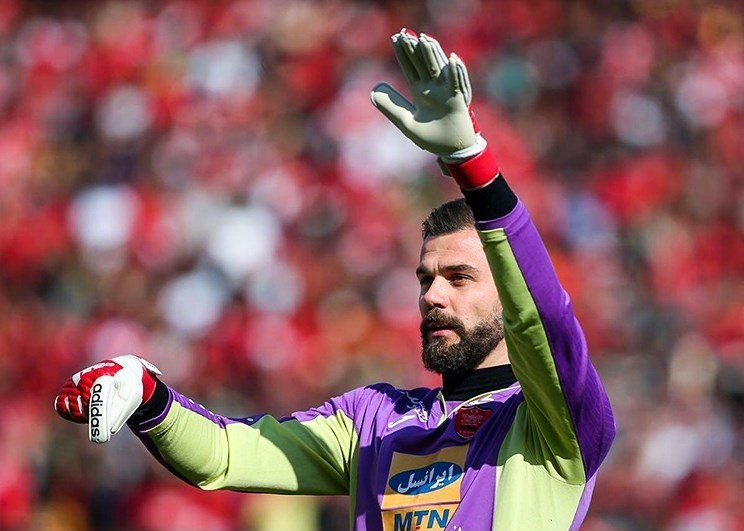
Božidar Radošević in Tehran derby

Persepolis ended a nine-year wait to reclaim the Persian Gulf Pro League title, achieving the championship with remarkable statistics. Their success extended beyond domestic competition, as they also impressed on the continental stage by reaching the semifinals of the 2017 AFC Champions League.

Great success was achieved with Croatian expert coach on the bench Branko Ivanković.

His second season didn't perform that much, only 3 games but Radošević won Super Cup and again Persian Gulf Pro League. The team also reached the finals of the AFC Champions League 2018 which they lost against Kashima Antlers. On 19 April 2018, he signed a three years contract extension with the Tehran-based club.

Radošević's third season in Persepolis was also successful. The team won three competitions Persian Gulf Pro League, Hazfi Cup and Super Cup. Radošević performed in some matches but still was second choice in Persepolis. The first goalkeeper was Alireza Beiranvand. At the end of the season Croatian coach Branko Ivanković left the team and signed a contract with Saudi Professional League team Al-Ahli.

Gabriel Calderon becomes the new coach of Persepolis. After three years of waiting, Radošević gets a chance as the first goalkeeper in front of Beiranvand which was an unexpected move by Calderon. First half season Rado performed perfectly without conceding a goal. He was selected for the half season best eleven in the Persian Gulf Pro League. Calderon left the bench in December 2019.

In February 2020 he signed a new four-year contract making him the longest-serving foreigner in Persepolis history.

== Career statistics ==
=== Club ===
As of 28 May 2023

Club	Season	League			Cup		Continental		Other		Total	
Club	Season	Division	Apps	Goals	Apps	Goals	Apps	Goals	Apps	Goals	Apps	Goals
Istra 1961	2012–13	Prva HNL	3	0	0	0	—		—		3	0
Šibenik	2012–13	Druga HNL	11	0	0	0	—		—		11	0
Inter Zaprešić	2013–14	Druga HNL	32	0	4	0	—		—		36	0
Koper	2014–15	PrvaLiga	10	0	0	0	4	0	—		14	0
Balmazújvárosi	2014–15	N.B. II	15	0	—		—		—		15	0
Debrecen	2015–16	N.B. I	23	0	5	0	0	0	—		28	0
Debrecen	2016–17	N.B. I	0	0	—		4	0	—		4	0
Debrecen	Total		23	0	5	0	4	0	0	0	32	0
Persepolis	2016–17	Pro League	6	0	1	0	0	0	—		7	0
Persepolis	2017–18	Pro League	3	0	0	0	0	0	0	0	3	0
Persepolis	2018–19	Pro League	6	0	2	0	0	0	0	0	8	0
Persepolis	2019–20	Pro League	16	0	2	0	0	0	—		18	0
Persepolis	2020–21	Pro League	1	0	2	0	1	0	0	0	4	0
Persepolis	2021–22	Pro League	2	0	0	0	—		—		2	0
Persepolis	Total		34	0	7	0	1	0	0	0	42	0
Varaždin	2022–23	Prva HNL	2	0	1	0	—		—		3	0
Gorica	2022–23	Prva HNL	10	0	—		—		—		10	0
Career Total			-	-	-	-	-	-	-	-	-	-

== Honours ==
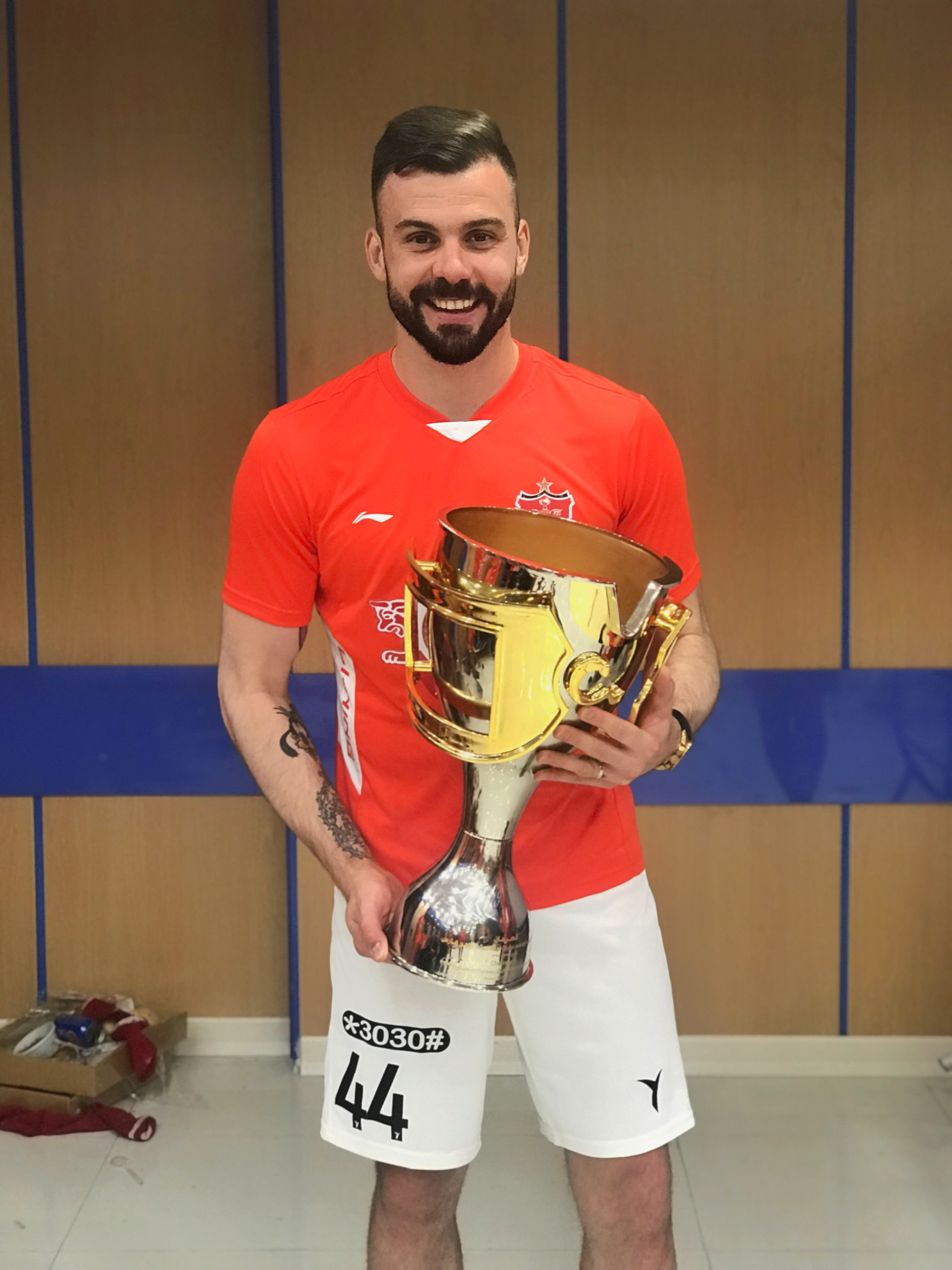
Radošević celebrating third league title with Persepolis

=== Club ===
Željezničar

- Bosnian Premier League (1): 2009–10

Budućnost

- Montenegrin First League (1): 2011–12

Persepolis

- Persian Gulf Pro League (5): 2016–17, 2017–18, 2018–19, 2019–20, 2020–21
- Iran Hazfi Cup (1): 2018–19
- Iranian Super Cup (4): 2017, 2018, 2019, 2020
- AFC Champions League runner-up (2): 2018, 2020
