= 2021 Iranian Super Cup =

Persepolis	Foolad
Persian Gulf Pro League	Hazfi Cup
0	1
- Date: 7 February 2022
- Venue: Shahid Qasem Soleimani Stadium, Sirjan
- Referee: Mohammad Reza Akbarian

The 2021 Iranian Super Cup was the 7th Iranian Super Cup, an annual football match played between the winners of the previous season's Persian Gulf Pro League, Persepolis, and the previous season's Hazfi Cup, Foolad.

Persepolis were the defending champions as winners of the 2020 Iranian Super Cup.

Foolad defeated Persepolis 1–0 to win their first title.

== Teams ==
Team	Title	Previous appearances (bold indicates winners)
Persepolis	2020–21 Persian Gulf Pro League champions	4 (**2017**, **2018**, **2019, 2020**)
Foolad	2020–21 Hazfi Cup champions	1 (2005)

== Match ==
=== Details ===
7 February 2022
17:15 IRST +03:30

Foolad	1–0	Persepolis
Coulibaly 18'	Report

Shahid Qasem Soleimani, Sirjan
Referee: Mohammad Reza Akbarian

== See also ==
- 2020–21 Persian Gulf Pro League
- 2020-21 Hazfi Cup
