= 2020 Iranian Super Cup =

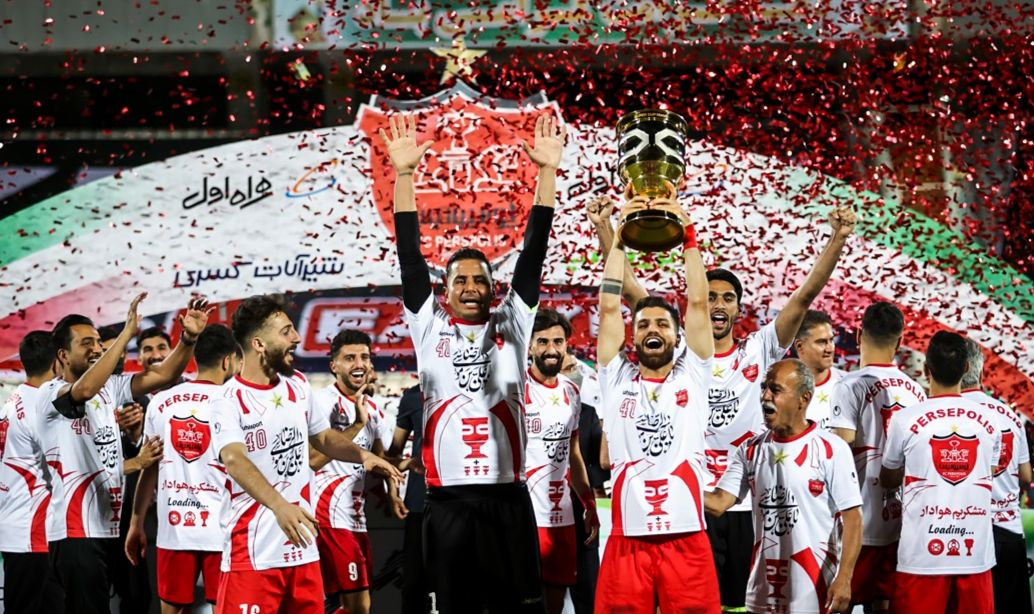
Persepolis	Tractor
Persian Gulf Pro League	Hazfi Cup
1	0
- Date: 20 June 2021
- Venue: Azadi Stadium, Tehran
- Referee: Ali Safaei

The 2020 Iranian Super Cup was the 6th Iranian Super Cup, an annual football match played between the winners of the previous season's Persian Gulf Pro League, Persepolis, and the previous season's Hazfi Cup, Tractor.

Persepolis were the defending champions as winners of the 2019 Iranian Super Cup, and defended their title.

== Teams ==
Team	Title	Previous appearances (bold indicates winners)
Persepolis	2019–20 Persian Gulf Pro League champions	3 (**2017**, **2018**, **2019**)
Tractor	2019–20 Hazfi Cup champions	None

== Match ==
=== Details ===
20 June 2021
20:00 IRST +03:30

Persepolis	1–0	Tractor
Alekasir 61'	Report

Azadi Stadium, Tehran
Referee: Ali Safaei

== Gallery ==
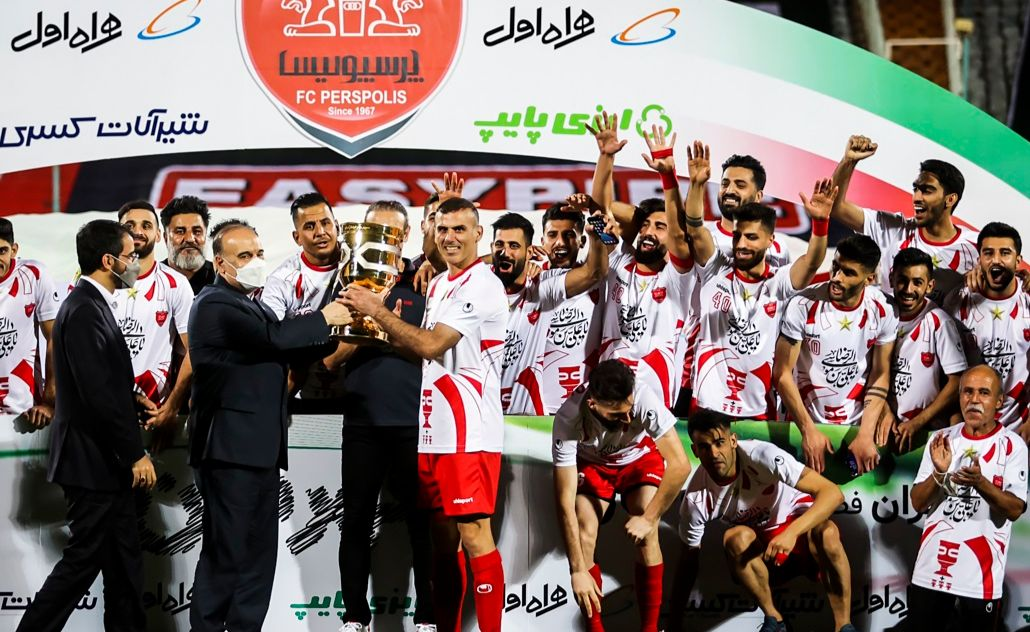

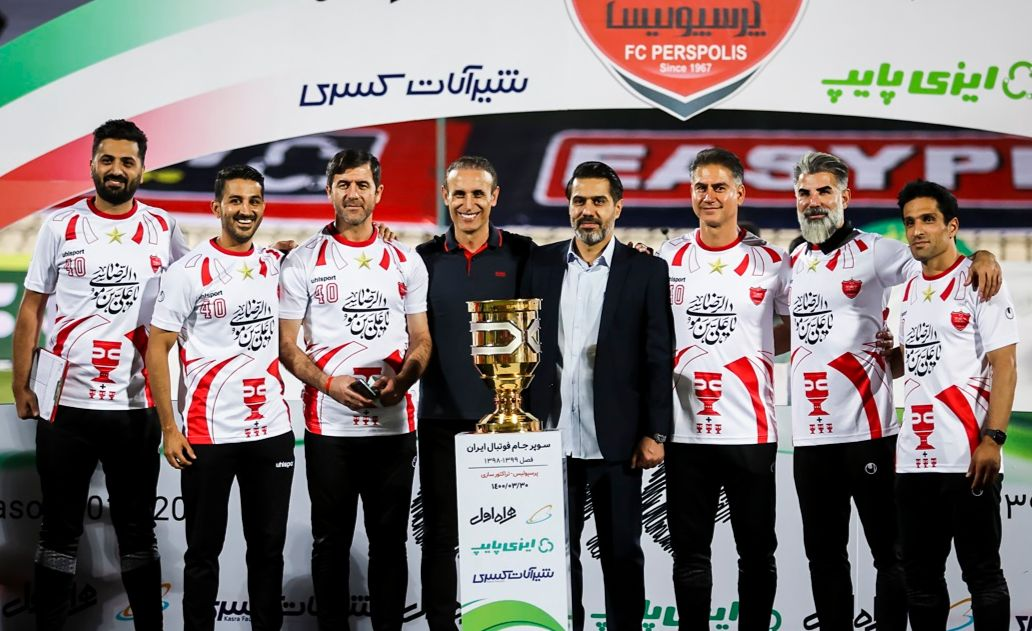
