= 2018–19 Padideh Shahr-e Khodrou F.C. season =

Padideh Shahr-e Khodrou
2018–19 season
- Chairman: Javad Vatankhah
- Manager: Yahya Golmohammadi
- Stadium: Imam Reza Stadium
- Persian Gulf Cup: 4th
- Hazfi Cup: Quarter-Final
Home colours	Away colours

The 2018–19 season are the Padideh Football Club's 5th season in the Iran Pro League and the top division of Iranian football. They are also competing in the Hazfi Cup.

== Squad ==
=== First-team squad ===
Updated as April 9, 2019
Note: Flags indicate national team as defined under FIFA eligibility rules; some limited exceptions apply. Players may hold more than one non-FIFA nationality.

No.	Pos.	Nation	Player
2	DF	IRN	Fariborz Gerami
3	DF	IRN	Ali Nemati ^{U25}
4	DF	IRN	Hossein Moradmand
5	DF	IRN	Abdollah Hosseini
6	MF	IRN	Masoud Rigi
7	MF	IRN	Reza Nasehi (captain)
8	MF	IRN	Akbar Sadeghi
9	FW	IRN	Amin Ghaseminejad
11	FW	IRN	Hossein Mehraban ^{U23}
12	GK	IRN	Yousef Behzadi
13	MF	IRN	Mohammad Ghaseminejad
17	MF	IRN	Sina Zamehran ^{U23}
18	MF	IRN	Amir Mansourian

No.	Pos.	Nation	Player
19	MF	IRN	Mehran Amiri
20	FW	NCA	Carlos Chavarría
25	DF	IRN	Mohammad Ghanbari
27	FW	IRN	Behnam Barzay
37	DF	IRN	Morteza Mansouri
50	MF	IRN	Farshad Hashemi ^{U23}
60	FW	IRN	Younes Shakeri
66	DF	IRN	Mohammad Mohammadzadeh ^{U21}
67	GK	IRN	Abolfazl Abbasi ^{U23}
77	DF	IRN	Javad Mohammadzadeh ^{U23}
78	FW	IRN	Hossein Shaji' ^{U21}
87	GK	IRN	Milad Farahani
90	FW	IRN	Mehdi Mehdikhani ^{U23}
99	MF	IRN	Ali Nabizadeh ^{U23}

For recent transfers, see List of Iranian football transfers winter 2018–19.

== Transfers ==
=== Summer ===
In: Note: Flags indicate national team as defined under FIFA eligibility rules; some limited exceptions apply. Players may hold more than one non-FIFA nationality.

No.	Pos.	Nation	Player
1	GK	IRN	Mohammad Nasseri (from Siah Jamegan)
25	DF	IRN	Mohammad Ghanbari (from Shahrdari Tabriz)
18	DF	IRN	Amir Mansourian (from Khooneh be Khooneh)
19	MF	IRN	Mehran Amiri (from Khooneh be Khooneh)
20	FW	BRA	Claudir (from Esteghlal Khuzestan)
60	FW	IRN	Younes Shakeri (from Siah Jamegan)
99	MF	IRN	Farshad Hashemi (from Naft Tehran)
13	FW	IRN	Mohammad Ghaseminejad (from Khooneh be Khooneh)
6	MF	IRN	Masoud Rigi (from Baadraan)
67	GK	IRN	Abolfazl Abbasi (from Baadraan U21)
12	GK	IRN	Yousef Behzadi (from Naft Masjed Soleyman)
88	MF	IRN	Ali Nabizadeh (from Persepolis Mashhad)
66	MF	IRN	Mohammad Mohammadzadeh (from Padideh U21)
77	DF	IRN	Javad Mohammadzadeh (from Padideh U21)

Out: Note: Flags indicate national team as defined under FIFA eligibility rules; some limited exceptions apply. Players may hold more than one non-FIFA nationality.

No.	Pos.	Nation	Player
13	MF	IRN	Mohsen Yousefi (to Machine Sazi)
44	FW	IRN	Karim Ebrahimi Rad (to Siah Jamegan)
1	GK	IRN	Shahab Gordan (to Sanat Naft)
3	DF	IRN	Mohammad Reza Khanzadeh (to (Qatar) Al Ahli)
21	MF	IRN	Milad Kamandani (to Malavan)
77	FW	IRN	Hossein Fazeli (to Sorkhpooshan Pakdasht)
23	FW	IRN	Moein Abbasian (to Saipa)
92	MF	IRN	Mohammad Esmaeil Nazari (to Shahin Bushehr)
25	GK	IRN	Ronie Khodabakhsh (to Ararat Tehran)
48	MF	IRN	Salar Afrasiabi (to Siah Jamegan)
11	FW	IRN	Mohammad Ghazi (to Paykan)
12	FW	IRN	Milad Gharibi (to Fajr Sepasi Shiraz)
40	DF	IRN	Babak Hatami (to Sepidrood)
45	MF	IRN	Hassan Dadashi (Released)
55	DF	IRN	Mohammad Seyed Moumen (Released)

== Coaching staff ==
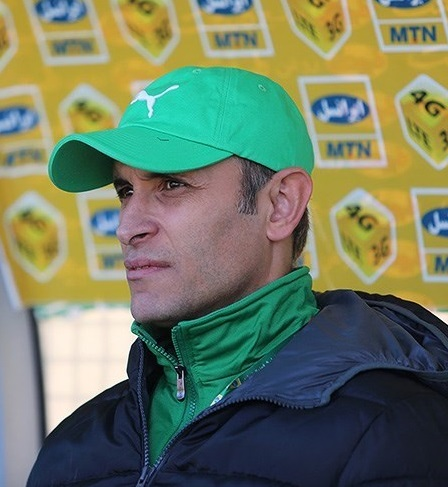
Yahya Golmohammadi is the current manager of Padideh

Position	Name
Head coach	(Iran) Yahya Golmohammadi
Assistant coach	(Iran) Saket Elhami
Assistant coach	(Iran) Mostafa Sedaghat
Assistant coach	(Croatia) Andrej Panadić
Goalkeeping coach	(Iran) Davoud Fanaei
Fitness coach	(Iran) Mazaher Rahimpour
Doctor	(Iran) Ali Azam
Analyzer	(Iran) Mohammad Asgari
Technical manager	(Iran) Mohammad Taghavi
Team manager	(Iran) Mojtaba Sarasiabi

== Competitions ==
=== Overview ===
Competition	First match	Last match	Starting round	Final position	Record							
Competition	First match	Last match	Starting round	Final position	Pld	W	D	L	GF	GA	GD	Win %
Pro League	27 July 2018	16 May 2019	Matchday 1		28	15	7	6	29	14	+15	53.57
Hazfi Cup	14 September 2018	18 February 2019	Round of 32	Quarter-Final	3	2	1	0	6	4	+2	66.67
Total					31	17	8	6	35	18	+17	54.84

Source: Competitions

=== Persian Gulf Pro League ===
==== Standings ====
Pos	Team	Pld	W	D	L	GF	GA	GD	Pts	Qualification or relegation
2	Sepahan	30	15	13	2	46	20	+26	58	Qualification for 2020 AFC Champions League group stage
3	Esteghlal	30	16	9	5	40	13	+27	57	Qualification for 2020 AFC Champions League Qualifying play-offs
4	Padideh	30	16	8	6	32	16	+16	56	Qualification for 2020 AFC Champions League Qualifying play-offs
5	Tractor Sazi	30	14	10	6	42	25	+17	52	
6	Zob Ahan	30	9	13	8	28	28	0	40	

Source: IPL Table
Rules for classification: 1) Points; 2) Goal difference; 3) Goals scored.

==== Results summary ====
Overall								Home						Away					
Pld	W	D	L	GF	GA	GD	Pts	W	D	L	GF	GA	GD	W	D	L	GF	GA	GD
28	15	7	6	29	14	+15	52	10	2	2	19	5	+14	5	5	4	10	9	+1

Last updated: 5 May 2019.
Source: Ipl Stats

==== Results by round ====
Round	1	2	3	4	5	6	7	8	9	10	11	12	13	14	15	16	17	18	19	20	21	22	23	24	25	26	27	28	29	30
Ground	H	A	H	A	H	A	H	A	H	A	H	A	H	A	H	A	H	A	H	A	H	A	H	A	H	A	H	A	H	A
Result	L	W	W	W	W	W	D	D	W	W	W	D	W	L	D	L	W	D	W	D	L	L	W	D	W	L	W	W	D	W
Position	13	7	2	1	1	1	1	1	1	1	1	1	1	2	2	3	3	3	3	3	5	5	5	5	5	5	5	4	4	4

Updated to match(es) played on 5 May 2019. Source: "Ipl".
A = Away; H = Home; W = Win; D = Draw; L = Loss

==== Matches ====
26 July 2018 1	Padideh	0–1	Persepolis	Mashhad
20:45 DST +04:30	Nemati (yellow card) 8'	Report	Alipour (yellow card) 4' (goal) 8' (pen.); Nourollahi (yellow card) 36'; Kamyabinia (yellow card) 73'; Hosseini (yellow card) 84'	Stadium: Imam Reza Stadium; Attendance: 27,700; Referee: Bijan Heydari

2 August 2018 2	Esteghlal Khuzestan	1–2	Padideh	Ahvaz
20:45 DST +04:30	Kheshtan 24'; Sharifi (yellow card) 25'; Pourabolghasem (yellow card) 56'; Namdari (yellow card) 60' (yellow-red card) 75'; Kalantari (yellow card) 75'	Report	Ghanbari (yellow card) 27' (yellow-red card) 41'; Ghaseminejad (yellow card) 63' (goal) 92'; Shakeri 95'; Sadeghi (yellow card) 96'	Stadium: Ghadir Stadium; Attendance: 100; Referee: Shahou Aslani

10 August 2018 3	Padideh	1–0	Sanat Naft	Mashhad
20:00 DST +04:30	Hosseini (yellow card) 77'; Mansourian (yellow card) 79'; Ghaseminejad 93'	Report	Baghlani (yellow card) 62'; Platini (yellow card) 79'; Barzay (yellow card) 80'	Stadium: Imam Reza Stadium; Attendance: 2,100; Referee: Koopal Nazemi

16 August 2018 4	Sepidrood	0–2	Padideh	Rasht
18:30 DST +04:30		Report	Mehraban 31'; Shakeri 76'; Sadeghi (yellow card) 88'	Stadium: Sardar Jangal Stadium; Attendance: 2,590; Referee: Alireza Faghani

24 August 2018 5	Padideh	2–1	Paykan	Mashhad
18:35 DST +04:30	Khalatbari 44'; Ghaseminejad 86'	Report	Batista (yellow card) 10'; Ghazi 78' (yellow card) 89'	Stadium: Imam Reza Stadium; Attendance: 7,150; Referee: Hassan Akrami

30 August 2018 6	Zob Ahan	1–2	Padideh	Isfahan
19:00 DST+04:30	Mohammadi (yellow card) 41'; Hernández (yellow card) 41'; Fakhreddini (yellow card) 54'; Marion (yellow card) 67'; Mohammadi 81'	Report	Nemati (yellow card) 41'; Sadeghi 55' (pen.); Khalatbari (yellow card) 61'; Shakeri 85'	Stadium: Foolad Shahr Stadium; Attendance: 500; Referee: Payam Heydari

23 September 2018 7	Padideh	0–0	Tractor Sazi	Mashhad
19:00 DST+03:30	Khalatbari (yellow card) 72'	Report	Shojaei (yellow card) 68'	Stadium: Imam Reza Stadium; Attendance: 14,000; Referee: Mohammad Hossein Zahedifar

28 September 2018 8	Pars Jonoubi Jam	1–1	Padideh	Jam
18:30 DST+03:30	Aliyari 60'; Mirjavan (yellow card) 74'; Sattari (yellow card) 92'	Report	Shakeri 33'; Moradmand (yellow card) 41'	Stadium: Takhti Stadium; Attendance: 7,000; Referee: Vahid Salehi

18 October 2018 9	Padideh	2–0	Foolad	Mashhad
15:00 DST+03:30	Nemati (yellow card) 44'; Shakeri 55'; Moradmand (yellow card) 76'; Khalatbari 79'	Report	Neguete (yellow card) 59'; Mirzaei (yellow card) 78'; Hashemizadeh (yellow card) 81'	Stadium: Imam Reza Stadium; Attendance: 7,500; Referee: Seyed Reza Mahdavi

25 October 2018 10	Naft Masjed Soleyman	0–1	Padideh	Masjed Soleyman
17:00 DST+03:30	Alizadeh (yellow card) 50'; Bijan (yellow card) 54'; Miri (yellow card) 86'; Asgari (yellow card) 93'	Report	M. Ghaseminejad (yellow card) 28'; Khalatbari (yellow card) 75'; Ghaseminejad 82'; Behzadi (yellow card) 94'	Stadium: Behnam Mohammadi Stadium; Attendance: 2,000; Referee: Mohammad Hossein Zahedifar

2 November 2018 11	Padideh	3–0	Nassaji	Mashhad
16:00 DST+03:30	Ghaseminejad 30' (yellow card) 69'; Rigi (yellow card) 60'; Mehraban 75'; M. Ghaseminejad 90+3'	Report	Divsalar (yellow card) 22'; Nazari (yellow card) 72'; Faraji (yellow card) 84'	Stadium: Imam Reza Stadium; Attendance: 6,000; Referee: Alireza Faghani

13 December 2018 12	Esteghlal	0–0	Padideh	Tehran
16:15 DST+03:30	Daneshgar (yellow card) 11'; Zakipour (yellow card) 29'; Sayyadmanesh (yellow card) 84' (yellow-red card) 88'	Report	Nemati (yellow card) 53'; Khalatbari (yellow card) 57'	Stadium: Azadi Stadium; Attendance: 50,000; Referee: Mohammad Hossein Zahedifar

25 November 2018 13	Padideh	1–0	Saipa	Mashhad
15:45 DST+03:30	M. Ghaseminejad 82'	Report	Sarfo (yellow card) 31'	Stadium: Imam Reza Stadium; Attendance: 10,500; Referee: Mehdi Seyedali

30 November 2018 14	Sepahan	1–0	Padideh	Isfahan
15:15 DST+03:30	Mohammadi 27' (yellow card) 28'; Ansari (yellow card) 60'	Report	Moradmand (yellow card) 59'	Stadium: Naghsh-e Jahan Stadium; Attendance: 38,000; Referee: Mohammadreza Akbarian

7 December 2018 15	Padideh	2–2	Machine Sazi	Mashhad
17:00 DST+03:30	Ghaseminejad 3'; Mehraban 39'; Ali Nemati (yellow card) 67'; Nasehi (yellow card) 90+6'	Report	Babaei 33'; Kanaanizadegan 52'; Ahle Shakheh (yellow card) 90+1' de Jesus (yellow card) 90+5'	Stadium: Imam Reza Stadium; Attendance: 12,000; Referee: Mouood Bonyadifar

6 February 2019 16	Persepolis	2–0	Padideh	Tehran
17:00 DST+03:30	Alipour 24' (pen.); Nemati 32'; Khalilzadeh (yellow card) 56'	Report	A. Hosseini (yellow card) 76'; Rigi (yellow card) 88'	Stadium: Azadi Stadium; Attendance: 25,000; Referee: Mehdi Seyedali

10 February 2019 17	Padideh	1–0	Esteghlal Khuzestan	Mashhad
15:15 DST+03:30	Mehdikhani 19'; M. Ghaseminejad (yellow card) 45'	Report	Darvishi (yellow card) 50'; Namdari (yellow card) 67'	Stadium: Imam Reza Stadium; Attendance: 5,000; Referee: Ashkan Khorshidi

14 February 2019 18	Sanat Naft	0–0	Padideh	Abadan
17:30 DST+03:30		Report		Stadium: Takhti Stadium; Attendance: 3,000; Referee: Mohammad Hossein Torabian

22 February 2019 19	Padideh	2–0	Sepidrood	Mashhad
15:30 DST+03:30	Moradmand (yellow card) 35'; Shakeri 40', 80'; Farahani (yellow card) 86'	Report		Stadium: Imam Reza Stadium; Attendance: 17,000; Referee: Ali Safaei

1 March 2019 20	Paykan	0–0	Padideh	Qods
16:00 DST+03:30	Mousavi (yellow card) 28'; Emamali (yellow card) 45'; Roostaei (yellow card) 81'	Report	S. Sadeghi (yellow card) 57'; Ali Nemati (yellow card) 82'; Shakeri (yellow card) 90'	Stadium: Shahr-e Qods; Attendance: 700; Referee: Mohammadreza Akbarian

7 March 2019 21	Padideh	0–1	Zob Ahan	Mashhad
17:00 DST+03:30	A. Ghaseminejad (yellow card) 58'; M. Ghaseminejad (yellow card) 66'	Report	Derakhshan Mehr (yellow card) 13'; Abbasi (yellow card) 45'; Safarzadeh (yellow card) 69'; Motahari 81', (yellow card) 89'	Stadium: Imam Reza Stadium; Attendance: 10,000; Referee: Seyed Hossein Zargar

14 March 2019 22	Tractor Sazi	1–0	Padideh	Tabriz
16:00 DST+03:30	Stokes 21'; Shojaei (yellow card) 80'	Report	Aghajanpour (yellow card) 90+5'	Stadium: Yadegar-e-Emam Stadium; Attendance: 29,700; Referee: Bijan Heydari

29 March 2019 23	Padideh	1–0	Pars Jonoubi Jam	Mashhad
17:00 DST +04:30	Moradmand (yellow card) 22'; Mansouri (yellow card) 63'; Barzay (yellow card) 68'; Shakeri 90+5'	Report	Seifollahi (yellow card) 18'; Gohari (red card) 90+1'; Salehi (yellow card) 90+3'	Stadium: Imam Reza Stadium; Attendance: 8,000; Referee: Alireza Faghani

5 April 2019 24	Foolad	1–1	Padideh	Ahvaz
16:00 DST +04:30	Chimba 30', (yellow card) 69'	Report	M. Ghaseminejad (yellow card) 27'; A. Ghaseminejad 32' (pen.); Barzay (yellow card) 48'	Stadium: Foolad Arena; Attendance: 5,000; Referee: Mohammadreza Akbarian

12 April 2019 25	Padideh	3–0	Naft Masjed Soleyman	Mashhad
17:30 DST +04:30	Rigi 19'; A. Ghaseminejad 28', 60'; Moradmand (yellow card) 62'	Report	Bijan (yellow card) 26'; Taheri (yellow card) 44'; Afaghi (yellow card) 89'; Gholamrezapour (yellow card) 90' (yellow-red card) 90+1'	Stadium: Imam Reza Stadium; Attendance: 7,000; Referee: Reza Kermanshahi

19 April 2019 26	Nassaji	1–0	Padideh	Qaem Shahr
16:00 DST +04:30	Mamashli 46'; Lak (yellow card) 83'; Faraji (yellow card) 90+4'	Report		Stadium: Vatani Stadium; Attendance: 9,000; Referee: Mohammad Hossein Zahedifar

27 April 2019 27	Padideh	1–0	Esteghlal	Mashhad
20:15 DST +04:30	Barzay 8'; M. Ghaseminejad (yellow card) 42'; Sadeghi (yellow card) 45+3'; Farahani (yellow card) 89'	Report	Gonçalves (yellow card) 67'	Stadium: Imam Reza Stadium; Attendance: 27,700; Referee: Koopal Nazemi

5 May 2019 28	Saipa	v	Padideh	Qods
18:15 DST +04:30		Report		Stadium: Shahr-e Qods

11 May 2019 29	Padideh	v	Sepahan	Mashhad
21:00 DST +04:30		Report		Stadium: Imam Reza Stadium

16 May 2019 30	Machine Sazi	v	Padideh	Tabriz
21:00 DST +04:30		Report		Stadium: Bonyan Diesel Stadium

=== Hazfi Cup ===
13 September 2018 Round of 32	Zob Ahan	1–2	Padideh	Isfahan
18:30 DST+04:30	Safarzadeh 2'; Mohammadi (yellow card) 52'	Report	Sadeghi 33', 90+1'; Mansouri (yellow card) 85'; Behzadi (yellow card) 90+5'	Stadium: Foolad Shahr Stadium; Attendance: 1,000; Referee: Mouood Bonyadifar

5 October 2018 Round of 16	Padideh	3–2 (a.e.t.)	Foolad	Mashhad
16:35 DST+03:30	Moridi 73' (o.g.); Sadeghi (yellow card) 79' (yellow-red card) 120'; Khalatbari (yellow card) 95'; M. Ghaseminejad (yellow card) 105'; Sadeghi 107'; Mehdikhani 109' (yellow card) 109'	Report	Horatian 12'; Doraghi (yellow card) 40'; Salari (yellow card) 65'; Pereira 94'; Beyt Saeed (yellow card) 110'	Stadium: Imam Reza Stadium; Attendance: 5,500; Referee: Mohammadreza Akbarian

18 February 2019 Quarter-Final	Persepolis	1–1 (a.e.t.) (3–1 p)	Padideh	Tehran
17:15 DST+03:30	Mosleh 20'	Report	Mehdikhani 12'; Moradmand (yellow card) 25'; Shakeri (yellow card) 69'; Sadri (yellow card) 114'; Barzay (yellow card) 120'	Stadium: Azadi Stadium; Attendance: 22,000; Referee: Ashkan Khorshidi
	Penalties
	Resan (penalty missed); Nourollahi (penalty scored); Budimir (penalty scored); Shiri (penalty missed); Alipour (penalty scored)		Barzay (penalty scored); Rigi (penalty missed); Moradmand (penalty missed); Nemati (penalty missed)

== See also ==
- 2018–19 Iran Pro League
- 2018–19 Hazfi Cup
