= 2018–19 Persian Gulf Pro League =

18th season of Persian Gulf Pro League

Persian Gulf Pro League
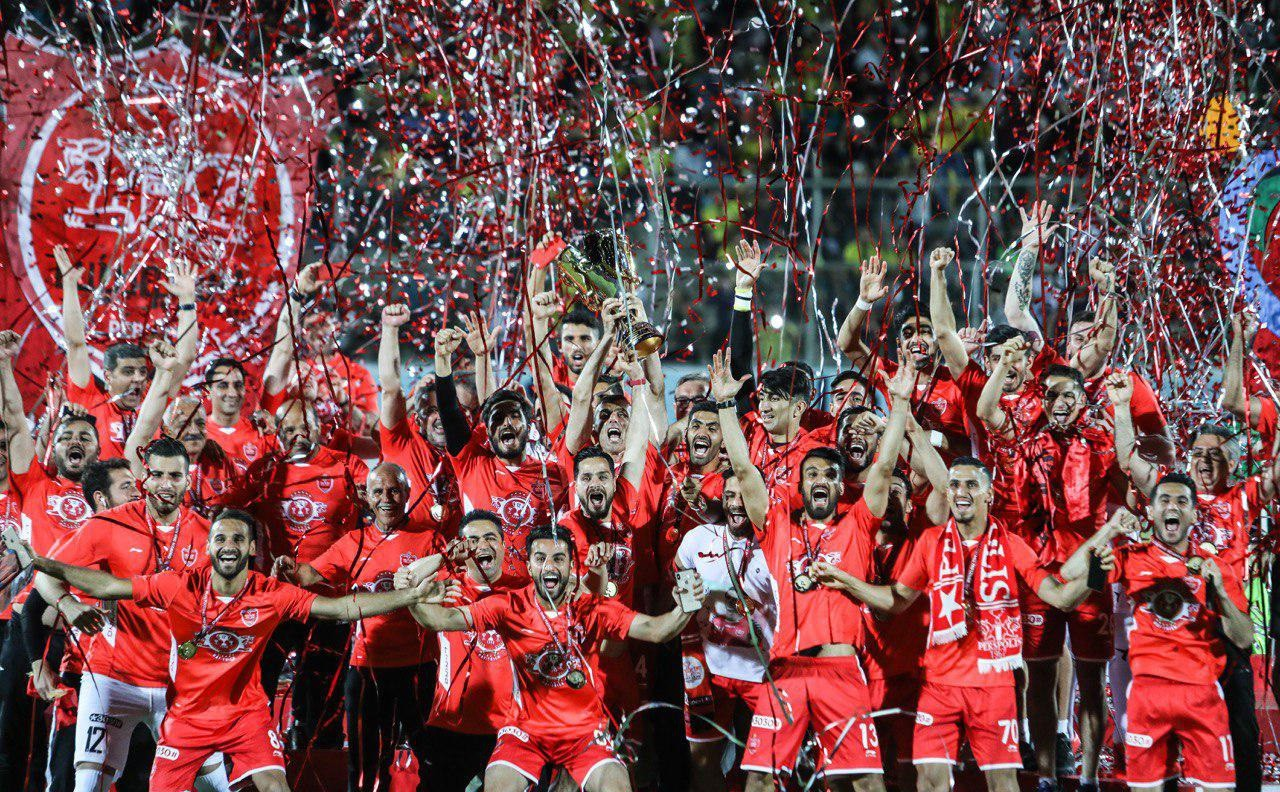
- Season: 2018–19
- Champions: Persepolis; 5th Pro League title 12th Iranian title
- Relegated: Sepidrood; Esteghlal Khuzestan
- Champions League: Persepolis; Sepahan; Esteghlal; Padideh
- Matches: 240
- Goals: 474 (1.98 per match)
- Top goalscorer: Kiros Stanlley; Luciano Pereira (16 goals each)
- Best goalkeeper: Alireza Beiranvand (16 clean sheets)
- Biggest home win: Tractor Sazi 6–0 Esteghlal Khuzestan (28 September 2018)
- Biggest away win: Sepidrood 1–6 Sepahan (3 August 2018)
- Highest scoring: Sepidrood 1–6 Sepahan (3 August 2018); Saipa 2–5 Sepahan (18 April 2019)
- Longest winning run: 5 matches Padideh, Sepahan and Esteghlal
- Longest unbeaten run: 17 matches Sepahan
- Longest winless run: 13 matches Zob Ahan
- Longest losing run: 7 matches Paykan
- Highest attendance: 90,000; Persepolis – Sepahan (26 April 2019)
- Lowest attendance: 0 (spectator ban); Sepahan – Sanat Naft (27 July 2018); Tractor Sazi – Nassaji (3 August); Sanat Naft – Machine Sazi (3 August 2018); Sanat Naft – Tractor Sazi (20 October 2018); Sepahan – Sepidrood (10 February 2019)
- Total attendance: 2,869,814
- Average attendance: 12,212

The 2018–19 Persian Gulf Pro League (formerly known as Iran Pro League) was the 36th season of Iran's Football League and 18th as Persian Gulf Pro League since its establishment in 2001. Persepolis were the defending champions. The season featured 13 teams from the 2017–18 Persian Gulf Pro League and two new teams promoted from the 2017–18 Azadegan League: Naft Masjed Soleyman as champions and Nassaji Mazandaran. Machine Sazi replaced Gostaresh. The league started on 26 July 2018 and ended on 16 May 2019. Persepolis won the Pro League title for the fifth time in their history, a total 12th Iranian title.

== Teams ==
=== Stadia and locations ===
Locations of clubs in 2018–19 Persian Gulf Pro League

Team	Location	Stadium	Capacity
Esteghlal	Tehran	Azadi	78,116
Esteghlal Khuzestan	Ahvaz	Ghadir	38,900
Foolad	Ahvaz	Ghadir; Foolad Arena	38,900; 30,655
Machine Sazi	Tabriz	Bonyan Diesel	12,000
Naft Masjed Soleyman	Masjed Soleyman	Behnam Mohammadi	8,000
Nassaji Mazandaran	Qaem Shahr	Vatani	15,000
Padideh	Mashhad	Imam Reza	27,700
Pars Jonoubi Jam	Jam	Takhti Jam	15,000
Paykan	Shahr-e Qods	Shahre Qods	25,000
Persepolis	Tehran	Azadi	78,116
Saipa	Tehran	Dastgerdi	8,250
Sanat Naft	Abadan	Takhti Abadan	10,000
Sepahan	Isfahan	Naghsh-e-Jahan	75,000
Sepidrood	Rasht	Sardar Jangal	15,000
Tractor Sazi	Tabriz	Sahand	66,833
Zob Ahan	Fooladshahr	Fooladshahr	15,000

=== Personnel and kits ===
Note: Flags indicate national team as has been defined under FIFA eligibility rules. Players may hold more than one non-FIFA nationality.

Team	Manager	Captain	Kit manufacturer
Esteghlal	(Iran) Farhad Majidi (caretaker)	(Iran) Mehdi Rahmati	(China) Li-Ning
Est. Khuzestan	(Iran) Mohammad Alavi	(Iran) Ahmad Alenemeh	(China) Li-Ning
Foolad	(Iran) (United States) Afshin Ghotbi	(Iran) Ayoub Vali	(Germany) Uhlsport
Machine Sazi	(Iran) Mohammad Reza Mohajeri	(Iran) Esmaeil Farhadi	(Iran) Merooj
Naft MIS	(Iran) Firouz Karimi	(Iran) Milad Meydavoudi	(Iran) Merooj
Nassaji	(Iran) Majid Jalali	(Iran) Mohammad Abbaszadeh	(Germany) Uhlsport
Padideh	(Iran) Yahya Golmohammadi	(Iran) Reza Nasehi	(Iran) Yousef Jame
Pars Jonoubi	(Iran) Mehdi Tartar	(Iran) Mohammad Nouri	(Iran) Merooj
Paykan	(Iran) Hossein Faraki	(Iran) Arman Ghasemi	(Iran) Yousef Jame
Persepolis	(Croatia) Branko Ivanković	(Iran) Jalal Hosseini	(China) Li-Ning
Saipa	(Iran) Ebrahim Sadeghi (caretaker)	(Iran) Roozbeh Shahalidoost	(Iran) Start
Sanat Naft	(Portugal) Paulo Sérgio	(Iran) Hossein Baghlani	(Iran) Merooj
Sepahan	(Iran) Amir Ghalenoei	(Iran) Rasoul Navidkia	(Iran) Start
Sepidrood	(Iran) Nader Dastneshan	(Iran) Hossein Kaebi	(Iran) Merooj
Tractor Sazi	(Belgium) Georges Leekens	(Iran) Masoud Shojaei	(Iran) Merooj
Zob Ahan	(Iran) Alireza Mansourian	(Iran) Ghasem Haddadifar	(Iran) Merooj

== Managerial changes ==
Team	Outgoing head coach	Manner of departure	Date of vacancy	Position in table	Incoming head coach	Date of appointment
Sepahan	(Iran) Mansour Ebrahimzadeh	Contract expired	1 May 2018	Pre-season	(Iran) Amir Ghalenoei	23 May 2018
Esteghlal Khuzestan	(Iran) Abdollah Veisi	Contract expired	5 May 2018	Pre-season	(Iran) Dariush Yazdi	5 May 2018
Padideh	(Iran) Mohammad Reza Mohajeri	Contract expired	10 May 2018	Pre-season	(Iran) Yahya Golmohammadi	4 June 2018
Tractor Sazi	(Turkey) Ertuğrul Sağlam	Signed by Kayserispor	16 May 2018	Pre-season	(Wales) John Toshack	9 June 2018
Zob Ahan	(Iran) Amir Ghalenoei	Signed by Sepahan	23 May 2018	Pre-season	(United States) Omid Namazi	24 May 2018
Sanat Naft	(Iran) Faraz Kamalvand	Contract Expired	4 June 2018	Pre-season	(Portugal) Paulo Sérgio	4 June 2018
Sepidrood	(Iran) Ali Karimi	Resigned	18 June 2018	Pre-season	(Iran) Khodadad Azizi	1 July 2018
Naft MIS	(Iran) Mahmoud Fekri	Resigned	1 July 2018	Pre-season	(Iran) Abdollah Veisi	1 July 2018
Sepidrood	(Iran) Khodadad Azizi	Resigned	12 August 2018	16th	(Iran) Ali Karimi	23 August 2018
Machine Sazi	(Iran) Firouz Karimi	Sacked	24 August 2018	13th	(Iran) Mohammad Reza Mohajeri	29 August 2018
Foolad	(Iran) Sirous Pourmousavi	Sacked	4 September 2018	9th	(Romania) Ilie Stan	25 September 2018
Naft MIS	(Iran) Abdollah Veisi	Sacked	5 September 2018	15th	(Iran) Alireza Marzban	7 September 2018
Tractor Sazi	(Wales) John Toshack	Resigned	17 September 2018	6th	(Iran) Mohammad Taghavi	17 September 2018
Zob Ahan	(United States) Omid Namazi	Sacked	14 November 2018	11th	(Iran) Alireza Mansourian	15 November 2018
Esteghlal Khuzestan	(Iran) Dariush Yazdi	Sacked	19 November 2018	16th	(Iran) Karim Boostani	20 November 2018
Foolad	(Romania) Ilie Stan	Sacked	21 November 2018	13th	(Iran) Afshin Ghotbi	1 December 2018
Paykan	(Iran) Majid Jalali	Resigned	11 December 2018	8th	(Iran) Hossein Faraki	31 December 2018
Nassaji Mazandaran	(Iran) Javad Nekounam	Resigned	1 January 2019	10th	(Iran) Majid Jalali	19 January 2019
Tractor Sazi	(Iran) Mohammad Taghavi	Resigned	14 January 2019	4th	(Belgium) Georges Leekens	14 January 2019
Esteghlal Khuzestan	(Iran) Karim Boostani	Resigned	25 February 2019	16th	(Iran) Mohammad Alavi	1 April 2019
Naft MIS	(Iran) Ali Marzban	Sacked	14 April 2019	14th	(Iran) Firouz Karimi	15 April 2019
Esteghlal	(Germany) Winfried Schäfer	Sacked	29 April 2019	3rd	(Iran) Farhad Majidi (caretaker)	29 April 2019
Saipa	(Iran) Ali Daei	Sacked	1 May 2019	8th	(Iran) Ebrahim Sadeghi (caretaker)	1 May 2019

== Foreign players ==
The number of foreign players is restricted to four per Persian Gulf Pro League team, including a slot for a player from AFC countries. A team can use four foreign players on the field in each game, including at least one player from the AFC country.
In bold: Players that have been capped for their national team.

Club	Player 1	Player 2	Player 3	Asian Player	Former Players
Esteghlal	(Guinea-Bissau) **Isma**	(Nigeria) Godwin Mensha	(South Africa) **Ayanda Patosi**	(Iraq) **Humam Tariq**	(Germany) Markus Neumayr (Nigeria) **Alhaji Gero**
Esteghlal Khuzestan					
Foolad	(Brazil) Chimba	(Cameroon) **Raphaël Messi Bouli**	(Ivory Coast) Zié Diabaté	(Japan) Takafumi Akahoshi	(Brazil) Tartá (Brazil) Neguete
Machine Sazi	(Brazil) Fernando Jesus	(Scotland) Jai Quitongo			(Cameroon) Maximilien Elimbi (England) Harry Forrester
Naft MIS	(Mali) Moussa Coulibaly				
Nassaji	(Georgia (country)) **Giorgi Gvelesiani**	(Georgia (country)) Lasha Totadze	(Senegal) Arfang Daffé		
Padideh	(Nicaragua) **Carlos Chavarría**				
Pars Jonoubi Jam					
Paykan	(Brazil) Magno Batista	(Montenegro) **Marko Vukčević**			
Persepolis	(Croatia) Božidar Radošević	(Croatia) Mario Budimir		(Iraq) **Bashar Resan**	(Nigeria) Godwin Mensha
Saipa	(Ghana) **Samuel Sarfo**				
Sanat Naft	(Brazil) Jonathan Balotelli	(Brazil) Vinícius	(Senegal) Macoumba Kandji	(Kyrgyzstan) **Aziz Sydykov**	(Cape Verde) **Platini** (Iraq) **Karrar Jassim**
Sepahan	(Brazil) Kiros	(Hungary) **Vladimir Koman**			
Sepidrood	(Georgia (country)) Luka Nozadze	(Georgia (country)) Roman Chachua			
Tractor Sazi	(Republic of Ireland) **Anthony Stokes**	(Guinea) **Kévin Constant**	(Scotland) Lee Erwin	(Japan) Yukiya Sugita	(England) Harry Forrester
Zob Ahan	(Brazil) Marion	(Nigeria) **Christian Osaguona**			(Honduras) **Eddie Hernández**

== League table ==
Pos	Team	Pld	W	D	L	GF	GA	GD	Pts	Qualification or relegation
1	Persepolis (C)	30	16	13	1	36	14	+22	61	Qualification for 2020 AFC Champions League group stage
2	Sepahan	30	15	13	2	46	20	+26	58	Qualification for 2020 AFC Champions League group stage
3	Esteghlal	30	16	9	5	40	13	+27	57	Qualification for 2020 AFC Champions League Qualifying play-offs
4	Padideh	30	16	8	6	32	16	+16	56	Qualification for 2020 AFC Champions League Qualifying play-offs
5	Tractor Sazi	30	14	10	6	42	25	+17	52	
6	Zob Ahan	30	9	13	8	28	28	0	40	
7	Saipa	30	9	11	10	28	33	−5	38	
8	Foolad	30	9	11	10	30	39	−9	38	
9	Sanat Naft	30	7	16	7	31	30	+1	37	
10	Nassaji Mazandaran	30	7	15	8	29	29	0	36	
11	Paykan	30	9	8	13	27	35	−8	35	
12	Pars Jonoubi Jam	30	7	9	14	28	33	−5	30	
13	Machine Sazi	30	4	17	9	19	26	−7	29	
14	Naft Masjed Soleyman	30	3	13	14	16	34	−18	22	
15	Sepidrood (R)	30	3	11	16	24	53	−29	20	Relegation to 2019–20 Azadegan League
16	Esteghlal Khuzestan (R)	30	3	9	18	19	47	−28	12 (Note: FIFA has imposed a 6-points penalty on Esteghlal Khuzestan due to unpaid wages.)	Relegation to 2019–20 Azadegan League

Source: IPL Table
Rules for classification: 1) Points; 2) Goal difference; 3) Goals scored.
(C) Champions; (R) Relegated

== Results ==
Home \ Away	EST	ESK	FOL	MST	MIS	NSJ	PAD	PJJ	PAY	PRS	SAP	SNA	SEP	SPR	TRC	ZOB
Esteghlal		4–2	0–0	1–0	1–0	1–0	0–0	2–0	0–0	0–0	0–0	3–0	0–1	2–1	3–0	3–0
Est. Khuzestan	0–1		1–3	0–1	1–2	1–1	1–2	0–2	0–1	0–0	1–2	1–1	1–1	2–0	0–3	1–0
Foolad	1–3	0–0		1–1	1–0	2–1	1–1	2–1	1–1	2–1	1–2	1–4	1–1	0–1	2–2	1–1
Machine Sazi	0–0	1–1	0–1		1–1	0–0	1–2	1–0	0–1	0–1	0–0	1–0	1–1	1–1	0–2	1–2
Naft MIS	1–2	0–0	0–0	1–1		2–2	0–1	1–1	1–0	0–0	0–1	1–1	0–2	1–1	0–0	2–2
Nassaji	0–0	2–0	2–0	0–0	1–0		1–0	1–1	2–0	1–1	1–1	1–2	0–0	2–2	1–1	0–1
Padideh	1–0	1–0	2–0	2–2	3–0	3–0		1–0	2–1	0–1	1–0	1–0	1–1	2–0	0–0	0–1
Pars Jonoubi Jam	1–0	2–1	0–0	0–1	2–0	3–1	1–1		3–0	0–1	0–0	2–2	2–2	2–2	0–1	0–2
Paykan	0–4	1–0	2–3	1–1	1–0	0–1	0–0	3–2		0–2	3–0	1–1	0–1	1–0	1–2	0–1
Persepolis	1–0	2–0	3–0	1–1	0–0	2–1	2–0	3–1	2–1		3–2	1–0	0–0	1–0	0–0	1–0
Saipa	1–2	1–1	1–0	0–0	2–1	0–0	0–1	1–0	3–1	1–1		0–3	2–5	3–0	0–0	0–0
Sanat Naft	0–0	2–2	0–0	1–1	3–1	1–1	0–0	1–0	0–3	1–1	2–1		0–0	1–1	2–1	1–2
Sepahan	0–1	2–0	3–1	2–0	1–0	3–2	1–0	1–0	0–0	1–1	3–0	0–0		3–0	2–2	1–1
Sepidrood	0–5	1–2	1–2	1–1	0–1	1–3	0–2	1–0	2–2	1–3	2–2	0–0	1–6		3–1	0–0
Tractor Sazi	1–0	6–0	1–2	2–1	3–0	1–1	1–0	1–1	0–1	1–1	1–0	1–0	2–0	2–1		4–1
Zob Ahan	2–2	2–0	3–1	0–0	0–0	0–0	1–2	0–1	1–1	0–0	0–2	2–2	1–2	0–0	2–0	

Updated to match(es) played on 16 May 2019. Source: IPL Stats
Legend: Blue = home team win; Yellow = draw; Red = away team win.

=== Positions by round ===
Team ╲ Round	1	2	3	4	5	6	7	8	9	10	11	12	13	14	15	16	17	18	19	20	21	22	23	24	25	26	27	28	29	30
Persepolis	3	1	1	3	3	2	2	3	3	3	4	4	4	3	3	1	2	2	2	1	1	1	1	1	1	1	1	1	1	1
Sepahan	10	2	3	2	2	3	3	2	2	2	2	2	2	1	1	2	1	1	1	3	2	3	3	3	4	3	2	2	2	2
Esteghlal	7	9	4	7	8	10	11	7	5	7	6	8	6	5	5	5	5	5	4	4	3	2	4	4	3	2	3	3	3	3
Padideh	14	7	2	1	1	1	1	1	1	1	1	1	1	2	2	3	3	3	3	2	5	5	5	5	5	5	5	4	4	4
Tractor Sazi	9	12	15	9	11	6	5	6	7	4	3	3	3	4	4	4	4	4	5	5	4	4	2	2	2	4	4	5	5	5
Zob Ahan	4	4	6	8	4	8	9	9	9	9	9	11	13	14	14	14	14	14	14	14	13	12	11	10	8	8	7	7	6	6
Saipa	1	6	8	11	7	4	4	5	6	6	7	7	8	7	8	8	10	9	10	10	9	6	7	6	7	7	8	8	7	7
Foolad	2	8	9	5	5	9	10	10	12	12	12	13	9	9	7	7	6	6	6	7	7	7	6	7	6	6	6	6	8	8
Paykan	8	3	5	6	9	5	6	4	4	5	5	6	7	8	9	12	11	12	11	11	10	10	10	12	12	11	9	10	9	11
Sanat Naft	11	11	13	13	14	12	14	14	11	10	11	10	11	13	11	11	12	11	12	12	12	13	13	13	13	13	10	9	10	9
Nassaji	15	14	12	15	12	13	13	13	14	14	14	12	12	12	10	10	9	10	9	9	8	11	12	11	11	10	11	11	11	10
Pars Jonoubi Jam	13	5	7	4	6	7	8	8	8	8	8	5	5	6	6	6	7	7	7	6	6	8	8	8	9	9	12	12	12	12
Machine Sazi	6	10	10	10	13	14	12	12	10	11	10	9	10	11	13	9	8	8	8	8	11	9	9	9	10	12	13	13	13	13
Naft MIS	12	15	14	14	15	15	15	15	15	15	15	16	14	10	12	13	13	13	13	13	14	14	14	14	14	14	14	14	14	14
Sepidrood	16	16	16	16	16	16	16	16	16	16	16	15	15	15	15	15	15	15	15	15	15	15	15	15	15	15	15	15	15	15
Est. Khuzestan	5	13	11	12	10	11	7	11	13	13	13	14	16	16	16	16	16	16	16	16	16	16	16	16	16	16	16	16	16	16

Leader : 2020 AFC Champions League Group stage
2020 AFC Champions League qualifying play-off round
Relegation to 2019-20 Azadegan League

Updated to match(es) played on 16 May 2019. Source: IPL Table

== Season statistics ==
=== Top scorers ===
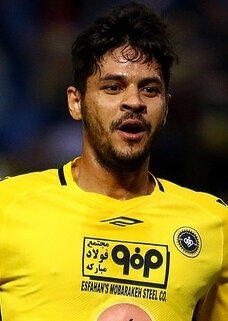
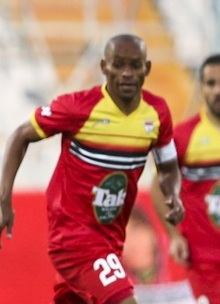
Kiros Stanlley, Sepahan player and Luciano Pereira of Foolad have scored 16 goals in the Persian Gulf Pro League.

Rank	Player	Club	Goals
1	(Brazil) Luciano Pereira	Foolad	16
1	(Brazil) Kiros Stanlley	Sepahan	16
3	(Iran) Ali Alipour	Persepolis	14
4	(Republic of Ireland) Anthony Stokes	Tractor Sazi	11
5	(Iran) Amin Ghaseminejad	Padideh	10
5	(Iran) Younes Shakeri	Padideh	10
7	(Iran) Issa Alekasir	Paykan	8
8	(Iran) Mehrdad Bayrami	Sepidrood	6
8	(Iran) Ashkan Dejagah	Tractor Sazi	6
8	(Iran) Mehrdad Mohammadi	Sepahan	6
8	(Iran) Amir Arsalan Motahari	Zob Ahan	6

=== Hat-tricks ===
Player	For	Against	Result	Date
(Republic of Ireland) Anthony Stokes	Tractor Sazi	Esteghlal Khuzestan	6–0 (H)	28 September 2018
(Scotland) Lee Erwin	Tractor Sazi	Zob Ahan	4–1 (H)	9 November 2018
(Brazil) Jonathan Balotelli	Sanat Naft	Foolad	4–1 (A)	19 April 2019

=== Clean sheets ===
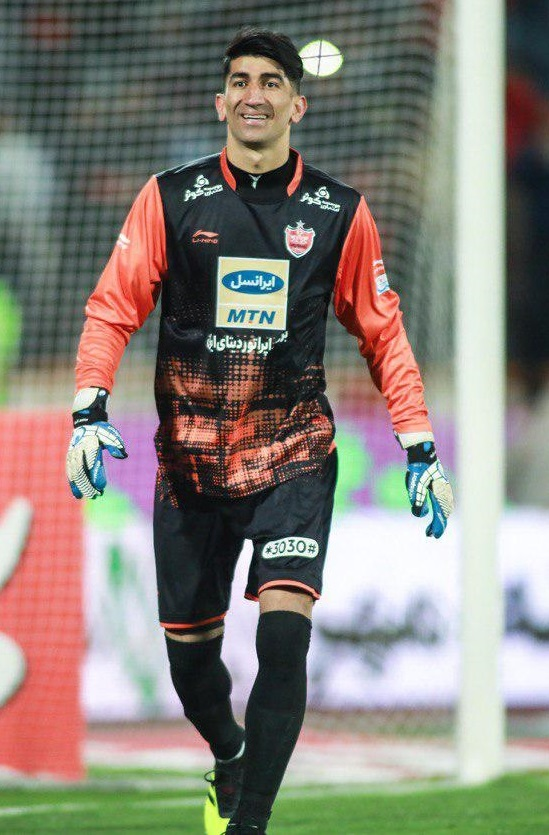
Alireza Beiranvand won his third Persian Gulf Pro League Golden Glove after keeping 16 clean sheets for Persepolis.

Rank	Player	Club	Clean sheets
1	(Iran) Alireza Beiranvand	Persepolis	16
2	(Iran) Payam Niazmand	Sepahan	15
3	(Iran) Mohsen Forouzan	Tractor Sazi	14
4	(Iran) Mohammad Rashid Mazaheri	Zob Ahan	12
4	(Iran) Mehdi Rahmati	Esteghlal	12
6	(Iran) Hamed Fallahzadeh	Saipa	10
6	(Iran) Hamed Lak	Nassaji	10
8	(Iran) Yousef Behzadi	Padideh	9
8	(Iran) Milad Farahani	Naft MIS / Padideh	9

== Attendances ==
=== Average home attendances ===
Pos	Team	Total	High	Low	Average	Change
1	Tractor Sazi	657,475	80,000	0	46,963	+326.4%
2	Persepolis	592,500	90,000	13,000	39,500	−0.7%
3	Esteghlal	427,000	78,000	10,000	28,467	−3.3%
4	Sepahan	267,000	60,000	0	20,538	+66.2%
5	Padideh	210,350	33,000	2,100	14,023	+88.3%
6	Nassaji	153,400	15,000	6,000	10,227	−21.0%
7	Foolad	121,610	40,000	300	8,107	+92.4%
8	Sepidrood	84,740	14,000	2,200	5,649	−33.1%
9	Naft MIS	72,850	10,000	1,850	4,857	−13.1%
10	Pars Jonoubi Jam	68,130	20,000	1,500	4,542	−35.1%
11	Sanat Naft	42,472	7,600	0	3,267	−49.5%
12	Zob Ahan	41,730	15,000	100	2,782	−0.9%
13	Saipa	35,563	13,650	150	2,371	−23.4%
14	Paykan	32,144	12,600	50	2,143	−4.8%
15	Machine Sazi	27,450	6,500	150	1,830	+640.9%
16	Est. Khuzestan	22,600	9,000	20	1,507	−49.4%
	League total	2,869,814	90,000	0	12,212	+34.8%

Updated to games played on 16 March 2019
Source: Iranleague.ir
Notes:
Matches with spectator bans are not included in average attendances
Machine Sazi, Naft MIS and Nassaji played last season in Azadegan League
Machine Sazi replaced Gostaresh

=== Attendances by round ===
Team/Round	1	2	3	4	5	6	7	8	9	10	11	12	13	14	15	16	17	18	19	20	21	22	23	24	25	26	27	28	29	30	Average
Esteghlal	28,000	A	78,000	A	30,000	A	A	70,000	A	37,000	A	44,000	A	12,000	A	A	21,000	A	16,000	A	15,000	17,000	A	17,000	A	17,000	A	10,000	A	15,000	28,467
Esteghlal Khuzestan	A	100	9,000	A	200	A	100	A	100	A	600	A	8,500	A	700	80	A	A	500	A	200	A	400	A	2,000	A	100	A	20	A	1,507
Foolad	1,800	A	A	1,000	A	450	A	300	A	500	A	500	A	2,060	A	A	26,000	4,000	A	40,000	A	23,000	A	12,000	A	5,300	A	2,700	A	2,000	8,107
Machine Sazi	300	A	400	A	710	A	620	A	1,450	A	4,100	A	4,000	6,500	A	A	150	A	800	A	5,500	A	1,100	A	420	A	400	A	A	1,000	1,830
Naft MIS	7,000	A	5,000	A	A	10,000	A	2,000	A	5,500	A	2,500	A	4,500	A	A	5,000	A	7,000	3,500	A	4,000	A	1,850	A	5,000	A	5,000	A	5,000	4,857
Nassaji	6,000	A	12,000	A	11,000	A	15,000	9,000	A	11,000	A	10,000	A	12,000	A	A	9,000	A	11,000	A	12,400	A	A	12,000	A	7,000	A	8,000	A	8,000	10,227
Padideh	21,000	A	2,100	A	7,150	A	14,000	A	7,500	A	12,000	A	10,500	A	20,200	A	6,000	A	17,000	A	22,000	A	7,500	A	5,400	A	33,000	A	25,000	A	14,023
Pars Jonoubi Jam	A	4,000	A	13,000	A	5,000	A	2,500	A	3,000	A	3,000	A	2,130	A	3,500	A	1,500	A	2,700	A	1,600	A	2,000	A	2,700	A	1,500	A	20,000	4,542
Paykan	A	300	A	200	A	151	A	852	A	A	4,841	A	300	A	910	7,000	A	3,700	A	620	A	50	A	12,600	180	A	125	A	315	A	2,143
Persepolis	A	50,000	A	40,000	A	23,500	15,000	A	13,000	A	23,000	A	45,000	A	38,000	20,000	A	30,000	A	20,000	A	A	81,000	A	47,000	A	90,000	A	57,000	A	39,500
Saipa	800	A	350	A	600	A	150	A	8,000	13,560	A	200	A	350	A	A	230	A	8,770	A	273	A	430	A	A	600	A	750	A	500	2,371
Sanat Naft	A	NC	A	2,000	6,000	A	5,200	A	NC	A	1,472	A	2,200	A	1,500	3,000	A	3,000	A	A	1,500	A	3,000	A	2,000	A	4,000	A	7,600	A	3,267
Sepahan	NC	A	15,000	A	9,000	A	8,500	A	10,000	A	16,200	50,000	A	38,000	A	A	NC	A	12,100	A	12,000	A	11,200	A	60,000	A	A	12,000	A	13,000	20,538
Sepidrood	A	4,500	A	2,590	A	3,900	A	A	6,000	A	5,000	A	5,600	A	14,000	5,000	A	2,200	A	3,000	A	7,450	3,000	A	7,500	A	8,000	A	7,000	A	5,649
Tractor Sazi	A	NC	A	60,165	A	35,610	A	41,000	A	43,000	A	70,000	A	A	70,000	30,000	A	80,000	A	46,000	A	29,700	A	40,000	A	40,000	A	60,000	12,000	A	46,963
Zob Ahan	A	10,000	A	7,500	A	500	A	500	A	300	A	A	800	A	1,500	580	A	1,200	A	320	A	100	A	730	A	15,000	2,300	A	400	A	2,782
Total	64,900	68,900	121,850	126,455	64,660	79,111	58,570	126,152	46,050	113,860	67,213	180,200	76,900	77,540	146,810	69,160	67,380	125,600	73,170	116,140	68,873	82,900	107,630	98,180	124,500	105,400	137,925	99,950	109,335	64,500	2,869,814
Average	9,271	11,483	15,231	15,807	8,083	9,889	7,321	15,769	6,579	14,233	8,402	22,525	9,613	9,693	18,351	8,645	9,626	15,700	9,146	14,518	8,609	10,363	13,454	12,273	15,563	11,575	17,241	12,494	13,667	8,063	12,212

Notes:
Updated to games played on 16 March 2019. Source: Iranleague.ir
Matches with spectator bans are not included in average attendances
Esteghlal Khuzestan played their matches against Foolad and Nassaji at Foolad Arena
Machine Sazi played their matches against Esteghlal Khuzestan and Tractor Sazi at Sahand
Saipa played their matches against Esteghlal and Persepolis at Takhti Tehran
Saipa played their matches against Foolad, Nassaji, Paykan, Padideh, Sanat Naft, Sepahan and Tractor Sazi at Shohada Shahr-e Qods
Sepahan played their match against Tractor Sazi at Foolad Shahr

=== Highest attendances ===
Rank	Home team	Score	Away team	Attendance	Date	Week	Stadium
1	Persepolis	0–0	Sepahan	90,000	26 April 2019	27	Azadi
2	Persepolis	1–0	Esteghlal	81,000	30 March 2019	23	Azadi
3	Tractor Sazi	1–0	Esteghlal	80,000	15 February 2019	18	Sahand
4	Esteghlal	3–0	Tractor Sazi	78,000	10 August 2018	3	Azadi
5	Esteghlal	0–0	Persepolis	70,000	27 September 2018	8	Azadi
5	Tractor Sazi	4–1	Zob Ahan	70,000	9 November 2018	12	Sahand
5	Tractor Sazi	1–2	Foolad	70,000	14 December 2018	15	Sahand
8	Tractor Sazi	1–0	Saipa	60,165	17 August 2018	4	Sahand
9	Sepahan	0–1	Esteghlal	60,000	12 April 2019	25	Naghsh-e Jahan
9	Tractor Sazi	1–1	Persepolis	60,000	1 May 2019	28	Sahand

Notes:
Updated to games played on 16 March 2019. Source: Iranleague.ir

== Awards ==
=== IFLO Seasonal awards ===
	Recipient
Best Player	(Iran) Alireza Beiranvand (Persepolis)
Best Young Player	(Iran) Allahyar Sayyadmanesh (Esteghlal)
Fair Player	(Iran) Payam Niazmand (Sepahan)
Fair Play Club	(Iran) Paykan
Best Goalkeeper	(Iran) Alireza Beiranvand (Persepolis)
Best Defender	(Iran) Jalal Hosseini (Persepolis)
Best Midfielder	(Iran) Mehdi Kiani (Sepahan)
Best Goalscorer	(Brazil) Luciano Pereira (Foolad) (Brazil) Kiros Stanlley (Sepahan)
Best Coach	(Croatia) Branko Ivanković (Persepolis)
Best Football Club	(Iran) Persepolis

=== Navad Monthly awards ===
Month	Manager of the Month		Player of the Month		References
Month	Manager	Club	Player	Club	References
August (Mordad)	(Iran) Yahya Golmohammadi	Padideh	(Iran) Mohammad Karimi	Sepahan	
September (Shahrivar)	(Iran) Amir Ghalenoei	Sepahan	(Brazil) Kiros Stanlley	Sepahan	
October (Mehr)	(Iran) Amir Ghalenoei	Sepahan	(Brazil) Kiros Stanlley	Sepahan	
November Aban	(Germany) Winfried Schäfer	Esteghlal	(Iran) Amin Ghaseminejad (Iran) Mohammad Ghaseminejad	Padideh	
December (Azar)	(Germany) Winfried Schäfer	Esteghlal	(Iran) Amin Ghaseminejad (Iran) Mohammad Ghaseminejad	Padideh	
February (Bahman)	(Germany) Winfried Schäfer	Esteghlal	(South Africa) Ayanda Patosi	Esteghlal	
March (Esfand)	(Germany) Winfried Schäfer	Esteghlal	(South Africa) Ayanda Patosi	Esteghlal	
April (Farvardin)	(Croatia) Branko Ivanković	Persepolis	(Brazil) Luciano Pereira	Foolad	
May (Ordibehesht)	(Portugal) Paulo Sergio	Sanat Naft	(Brazil) Luciano Pereira	Foolad	

== See also ==
- 2018–19 Azadegan League
- 2018–19 League 2
- 2018–19 League 3
- 2018–19 Hazfi Cup
- 2018 Iranian Super Cup
