= 2016–17 Hazfi Cup =

Jame Azadsazi Khorramshahr
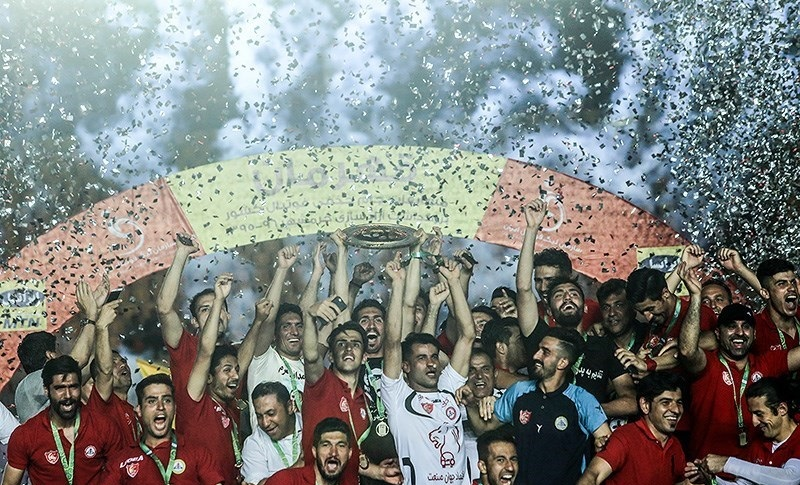

Tournament details
- Country: Iran
- Dates: 12 September 2016 – 11 May 2017
- Teams: 94

Final positions
- Champions: Naft Tehran (1st title)
- Runners-up: Tractor Sazi

Tournament statistics
- Matches played: 59
- Goals scored: 139 (2.36 per match)
- Top goal scorer: (Iran) Mohammad Ghazi (6 goals)

The 2016–17 Hazfi Cup was the 30th season of the Iranian football knockout competition. Zob Ahan Isfahan, the defending champions, were eliminated by Tractor Sazi in the semi-final in extra time. The competition started on 12 September 2016, and the final was played on 11 May 2017. Naft Tehran defeated Tractor Sazi in the final, earning their first title.

== Participating teams ==
A total of 94 teams participated in the 2016–17 Hazfi Cup. The teams were divided into three main groups, and included 16 teams of the Persian Gulf Pro League, 18 teams of Azadegan League, with 60 teams of the Iran 2nd Division League and Provincial Leagues.

== First stage ==
In the first stage of the "2016–17 Hazfi Cup", 60 teams from Iran 2nd Division League and Provincial Leagues are presented. Following the competition of the first stage, 30 teams qualified for the second stage.

=== First round ===
12 September 2016 1	Esteghlal Khoramshahr	0–1	Shahrdari Mahshahr	Khoramshahr
17:00 DST+03:30

12 September 2016 2	Keshavarz Meshginshahr	2–2 (3–5 p)	Safir Abyek Qazvin	Meshginshahr
17:00 DST+03:30

12 September 2016 3	Parag Tehran	0–0 (5–4 p)	Shahrdari Mianrud	Tehran
17:00 DST+03:30

12 September 2016 4	Esteghlal Aabi B Tehran	2–0	Omid Baharestan Tehran	Tehran
17:00 DST+03:30

12 September 2016 5	Shahbaz Nozhan Alborz	(w/o)	Shahrdari Hamedan	Karaj
17:00 DST+03:30
Note: Shahrdari Hamedan withdrew

12 September 2016 6	Ghazaye Sabz Mashhad	0–0 (4–1 p)	Pirouzi Garmsar	Mashhad
17:00 DST+03:30

12 September 2016 7	Haf Semnan	(w/o)	Shahr Baran Rasht	Semnan
17:00 DST+03:30
Note: Shahr Baran Rasht withdrew

12 September 2016 8	Shahrdari Ardabil	(w/o)	Shahrdari Tabriz	Ardabil
17:00 DST+03:30
Note: Shahrdari Ardabil withdrew

12 September 2016 9	Niroo Zamini Tehran	2–1	Kimia Farayand Tehran	Tehran
17:00 DST+03:30

12 September 2016 10	Shahrdari Fuman	(w/o)	Be'sat Kermanshah	Fuman
17:00 DST+03:30
Note: Be'sat Kermanshah withdrew

12 September 2016 11	Shahrdari Urmia	0–0 (4–3 p)	Sardar Bukan	Urmia
17:00 DST+03:30

12 September 2016 12	Mehregan Darreh Shahr	0–0 (4–1 p)	Rahpouyan Gilan	Darreh Shahr
17:00 DST+03:30

12 September 2016 13	Shahid Karimi Juybar	4–0	Keshavarz Aliabad	Juybar
17:00 DST+03:30

12 September 2016 14	Pas Hamedan	(w/o)	Shohada Garrus Bijar	Hamedan
17:00 DST+03:30
Note: Pas Hamedan withdrew

12 September 2016 15	Shahin Shahrdari Bushehr	(w/o)	Foolad Novin	Bushehr
17:00 DST+03:30
Note: Foolad Novin withdrew

12 September 2016 16	Shahin Bandar Ameri	(w/o)	Mahan Shushtar	Bandar Ameri
17:00 DST+03:30
Note: Mahan Shushtar withdrew

12 September 2016 17	Sanat Naft Novin	(w/o)	Shahrdari Arak	Abadan
17:00 DST+03:30
Note: Shahrdari Arak withdrew

12 September 2016 18	Aluminium Hormozgan	1–2	Oghab Tabriz	Bandar Abbas
17:00 DST+03:30

12 September 2016 19	Zagros Yasuj	(w/o)	Shahin Kish	Yasuj
17:00 DST+03:30
Note: Shahin Kish withdrew

12 September 2016 20	Naft Gachsaran	(w/o)	Shahrdari Kashan	Gachsaran
17:00 DST+03:30
Note: Shahrdari Kashan withdrew

12 September 2016 21	Esteghlal Latifi Larestan	1–2	Shahrdari Bandar Abbas	Larestan
17:00 DST+03:30

12 September 2016 22	Esteghlal Padideh Alborz	1–3	Baadraan Novin Tehran	Karaj
17:00 DST+03:30

12 September 2016 23	Arvand Khorramshahr	(w/o)	Etehad Lordegan	Khorramshahr
17:00 DST+03:30
Note: Arvand Khorramshahr withdrew

12 September 2016 24	Panah Afarin Qom	(w/o)	Omid Shahrdari Arak	Qom
17:00 DST+03:30
Note: Panah Afarin Qom withdrew

12 September 2016 25	New Bargh Shiraz	(w/o)	Aab o Bargh Kish	Shiraz
17:00 DST+03:30
Note: Aab o Bargh Kish withdrew

12 September 2016 26	Foulad Yasuj	(w/o)	Shahrdari Kahnuj	Yasuj
17:00 DST+03:30
Note: Shahrdari Kahnuj withdrew

12 September 2016 27	Kara Shiraz	(w/o)	Qashqai Shiraz	Shiraz
17:00 DST+03:30
Note: Kara Shiraz withdrew

12 September 2016 28	Naft Omidiyeh	1–1 (5–3 p)	Shahin Mahshahr	Omidiyeh
17:00 DST+03:30

12 September 2016 29	Giti Pasand Isfahan	(w/o)	Tarbiat Dizicheh Ardestan	Isfahan
17:00 DST+03:30
Note: Tarbiat Dizicheh withdrew

12 September 2016 30	Caspian Qazvin	(w/o)	Malavan Novin Anzali	Qazvin
17:00 DST+03:30
Note: Caspian Qazvin withdrew

== Second stage ==
The 16 teams from Persian Gulf Pro League are entered to competition from the second stage. They compete together with 18 teams of Azadegan League and 30 winner teams of First stage.

=== Bracket ===
Round of 64
H	Ghazaye Sabz	0
A	Sepahan	4
H	Pars Jam	(w/o)
A	Niroo Zamini
H	Aluminium Arak	(w/o)
A	Shahid Karimi
H	Paykan	2
A	Haf Semnan	0
H	Padideh	(w/o)
A	Shahbaz Alborz
H	Naft M.I.S	(w/o)
A	Esteghlal Aabi
H	Baadraan	2
A	Parag Tehran	0
H	Saipa	2
A	Baadraan Novin	0
H	Malavan Novin	0
A	Esteghlal	2
H	Mes Kerman	(w/o)
A	Kheybar
H	Shohada Bijar	(w/o)
A	Gol Gohar
H	Safir Abyek	0
A	Saba Qom	2
H	Sh. Tabriz	(w/o)
A	Sanat Naft
H	Sh. Fuman	(w/o)
A	Sepidrood
H	Nassaji	(w/o)
A	Sh. Urmia
H	Naft Tehran	7
A	Mehregan	0
H	Tractor Sazi	2
A	Foulad Yasuj	0
H	Malavan	(w/o)
A	Giti Pasand
H	New Bargh	1
A	Fajr Sepasi	0
H	Qashqai Shiraz	1 (6)
A	Persepolis	1 (5)
H	Est. Khuzestan	0
A	Naft Gachsaran	1
H	Rah Ahan	(w/o)
A	Sh. Bandar Abbas
H	Zagros Yasuj	0
A	Foolad Yazd	1
H	Oghab Tabriz	0
A	Foolad	1
H	Omid Sh. Arak	0
A	Gostaresh	5
H	Mes Rafsanjan	(w/o)
A	Naft Novin
H	Iranjavan	0
A	Naft Omidiyeh	1
H	Sh. Mahshahr	(w/o)
A	Siah Jamegan
H	Etehad Lordegan	2
A	Machine Sazi	11
H	Khooneh Be Kh.	2
A	Shahin Ameri	0
H	Esteghlal Ahvaz
A	Oxin Alborz	(w/o)
H	Shahin Bushehr	0 (5)
A	Zob Ahan	0 (6)

Round of 32
H	Sepahan	1
A	Pars Jam	0
A	Aluminium Arak	1
H	Paykan	0
A	Padideh	0
H	Naft M.I.S	1
A	Baadraan	1
H	Saipa	2
H	Esteghlal	1
A	Mes Kerman	0
A	Shohada Bijar	0
H	Saba Qom	4
H	Sh. Tabriz	0
A	Sh. Fuman	1
H	Nassaji	0
A	Naft Tehran	1
A	Tractor Sazi	1
H	Malavan	0
A	New Bargh	1
H	Qashqai Shiraz	0
H	Naft Gachsaran	(w/o)
A	Rah Ahan
H	Foolad Yazd	1
A	Foolad	2
H	Gostaresh	(w/o)
A	Mes Rafsanjan
H	Naft Omidiyeh	1
A	Sh. Mahshahr	2
H	Machine Sazi	2
A	Khooneh Be Kh.	1
H	Oxin Alborz	0
A	Zob Ahan	1

Round of 16
A	Sepahan	2
H	Aluminium Arak	1
H	Naft M.I.S	1
A	Saipa	2
H	Esteghlal	0 (5)
A	Saba Qom	0 (3)
A	Sh. Fuman	0
H	Naft Tehran	4
H	Tractor Sazi	2
A	New Bargh	0
A	Naft Gachsaran	0 (3)
H	Foolad	0 (2)
A	Gostaresh	(w/o)
H	Sh. Mahshahr
A	Machine Sazi	2
H	Zob Ahan	3

Quarter-final
H	Sepahan	2
A	Saipa	0
A	Esteghlal	2
H	Naft Tehran	3
A	Tractor Sazi	3
H	Naft Gachsaran	1
H	Gostaresh	0
A	Zob Ahan	2

Semi-final
H	Sepahan	0
A	Naft Tehran	1
A	Tractor Sazi	3
H	Zob Ahan	2

Final
-	Naft Tehran	1
-	Tractor Sazi	0

Note: H: Home team, A: Away team

=== Second round ===
29 September 2016 31	Ghazaye Sabz Mashhad	0–4	Sepahan	Mashhad
17:00 DST+03:30			Ghaed Rahmati 67'; Mirjavan 80', 93'; Alimohammadi 90'

29 September 2016 32	Pars Jonoubi Jam	(w/o)	Niroo Zamini Tehran	Bushehr
17:00 DST+03:30
Note: Niroo Zamini Tehran withdrew

29 September 2016 33	Aluminium Arak	(w/o)	Shahid Karimi Juybar	Arak
17:00 DST+03:30
Note: Shahid Karimi Juybar withdrew

29 September 2016 34	Paykan	2–0	Haf Semnan	Tehran
17:00 DST+03:30

29 September 2016 35	Padideh	(w/o)	Shahbaz Nozhan Alborz	Mashhad
17:00 DST+03:30
Note: Shahbaz Nozhan Alborz withdrew

29 September 2016 36	Naft Masjed Soleyman	(w/o)	Esteghlal Aabi B Tehran	Masjed Soleyman
17:00 DST+03:30
Note: Esteghlal Aabi B Tehran withdrew

29 September 2016 37	Baadraan Tehran	2–0	Parag Tehran	Tehran
17:00 DST+03:30

29 September 2016 38	Naft Tehran	7–1	Mehregan Darreh Shahr	Tehran
17:00 DST+03:30

29 September 2016 39	Nassaji Mazandaran	(w/o)	Shahrdari Urmia	Sari
17:00 DST+03:30
Note: Shahrdari Urmia withdrew

29 September 2016 40	Shahrdari Fuman	(w/o)	Sepidrood	Fuman
17:00 DST+03:30
Note: Sepidrood Rasht withdrew

29 September 2016 41	Shahrdari Tabriz	(w/o)	Sanat Naft	Tabriz
17:00 DST+03:30
Note: Sanat Naft withdrew

29 September 2016 42	Shohada Garrus Bijar	(w/o)	Gol Gohar	Bijar
17:00 DST+03:30
Note: Gol Gohar withdrew

29 September 2016 43	Sanat Mes	(w/o)	Kheybar Khorramabad	Kerman
17:00 DST+03:30
Note: Kheybar Khorramabad withdrew

29 September 2016 44	Shahin Shahrdari Bushehr	0–0 (5–6 p)	Zob Ahan	Bushehr
17:00 DST+03:30

29 September 2016 45	Esteghlal Ahvaz	(w/o)	Oxin Alborz	Ahvaz
17:00 DST+03:30
Note: Esteghlal Ahvaz withdrew

29 September 2016 46	Etehad Lordegan	2–11	Machine Sazi	Lordegan
17:00 DST+03:30

29 September 2016 47	Shahrdari Mahshahr	(w/o)	Siah Jamegan	Mahshahr
17:00 DST+03:30
Note: Siah Jamegan withdrew

29 September 2016 48	Mes Rafsanjan	(w/o)	Sanat Naft Novin	Rafsanjan
17:00 DST+03:30
Note: Sanat Naft Novin withdrew

29 September 2016 49	Rah Ahan	(w/o)	Shahrdari Bandar Abbas	Tehran
17:00 DST+03:30
Note: Shahrdari Bandar Abbas withdrew

29 September 2016 50	Zagros Yasuj	0–1	Foolad Yazd	Yasuj
17:00 DST+03:30

29 September 2016 51	Malavan	(w/o)	Giti Pasand Isfahan	Bandar Anzali
17:00 DST+03:30
Note: Giti Pasand withdrew

29 September 2016 52	New Bargh Shiraz	1–0	Fajr Sepasi	Shiraz
17:00 DST+03:30

30 September 2016 53	Saipa	2–0	Baadraan Novin Tehran	Tehran
17:00 DST+03:30

30 September 2016 54	Khooneh Be Khooneh	2–0	Shahin Bandar Ameri	Babol
17:00 DST+03:30

30 September 2016 55	Iranjavan	0–1	Naft Omidiyeh	Bushehr
17:00 DST+03:30

30 September 2016 56	Omid Shahrdari Arak	0–5	Gostaresh	Arak
17:00 DST+03:30

30 September 2016 57	Esteghlal Khuzestan	0–1	Naft Gachsaran	Ahvaz
17:00 DST+03:30

30 September 2016 58	Tractor Sazi	2–0	Foulad Yasuj	Tabriz
17:00 DST+03:30

30 September 2016 59	Qashqai Shiraz	1–1 (6–5 p)	Persepolis	Shiraz
17:00 DST+03:30	M.J. Zarei 9'		V. Pryyomov 59'	Stadium: Hafezieh Stadium; Attendance: 15.000; Referee: Mohammad Hossein Zahedifar
	Penalties
	(penalty scored) M.J. Zarei; (penalty missed) A. Asadi; (penalty scored) M. Chabok; (penalty scored) M. Razavi Pourian; (penalty scored) M. Shiri; (penalty scored) H. Moradi; (penalty scored) M. Sharifzadeh		(penalty scored) H. Mahini; (penalty scored) A. Nourollahi; (penalty scored) V. Pryyomov; (penalty scored) M. Mosalman; (penalty missed) K. Kamyabinia; (penalty scored) F. Ahmadzadeh; (penalty missed) S. Zahedi

1 October 2016 60	Malavan Novin Anzali	0–2	Esteghlal	Bandar Anzali
17:00 DST+03:30

1 October 2016 61	Oghab Tabriz	0–1	Foolad	Tabriz
17:00 DST+03:30

2 October 2016 62	Safir Abyek Qazvin	0–2	Saba Qom	Qazvin
17:00 DST+03:30

=== Third round ===
26 October 2016 63	Shahrdari Tabriz	0–1	Shahrdari Fuman	Tabriz
17:00 DST+03:30			Rahimi 25'

31 October 2016 64	Saipa	2–1	Baadraan Tehran	Tehran
17:00 DST+03:30	Rezaei 20'; Shiri 55' (pen.)		Vasei 30'

31 October 2016 65	Esteghlal	1–0 (a.e.t.)	Sanat Mes	Tehran
17:00 DST+03:30	Karimi 113'			Attendance: 10,000

31 October 2016 66	Malavan	0–1	Tractor Sazi	Bandar Anzali
17:00 DST+03:30			Iranpourian 22'

31 October 2016 67	Qashqai Shiraz	0–1	New Bargh Shiraz	Shiraz
17:00 DST+03:30

31 October 2016 68	Naft Gachsaran	(w/o)	Rah Ahan	Gachsaran
17:00 DST+03:30
Note: Rah Ahan Yazdan withdrew

31 October 2016 69	Naft Omidiyeh	1–2	Shahrdari Mahshahr	Omidiyeh
17:00 DST+03:30	Ghasemi 58' (pen.)		Hazbazvi 80' (pen.); Sariri 92'

31 October 2016 70	Machine Sazi	2–1	Khooneh Be Khooneh	Tabriz
17:00 DST+03:30	Ghaseminejad 44', 71' (pen.)		Naghizadeh 42' (pen.)

2 November 2016 71	Paykan	0–1	Aluminium Arak	Tehran
17:00 DST+03:30			Asgari 25'

2 November 2016 72	Gostaresh	(w/o)	Mes Rafsanjan	Tabriz
17:00 DST+03:30
Note: Mes Rafsanjan withdrew

3 November 2016 73	Nassaji Mazandaran	0–1	Naft Tehran	Qaem Shahr
17:00 DST+03:30			Asadi 4'

3 November 2016 74	Saba Qom	4–0	Shohada Garrus Bijar	Qom
17:00 DST+03:30	Hasanzadeh 21'; Abtahi 63', 69'; Seifpanahi 89'

3 November 2016 75	Foolad Yazd	1–2 (a.e.t.)	Foolad	Yazd
17:00 DST+03:30	Nabizadeh 34'		Sharifat 5'; Ansari 109'

3 November 2016 76	Oxin Alborz	0–1	Zob Ahan	Karaj
17:00 DST+03:30			Tabrizi 12'

4 November 2016 77	Sepahan	1–0	Pars Jonoubi Jam	Isfahan
17:00 DST+03:30	Karimi 20'			Attendance: 7,500

4 November 2016 78	Naft Masjed Soleyman	1–0	Padideh	Masjed Soleyman
17:00 DST+03:30	Bijan 67'

=== Fourth round ===
17 November 2016 79	Naft Tehran	4–0	Shahrdari Fouman	Tehran
14:15 DST+03:30	Ghazi 20' (pen.); Fakhreddini 39'; Motahari 60'; Prahić 73'			Attendance: 1,000

17 November 2016 80	Foolad	0–0 (a.e.t.) (2–3 p)	Naft Gachsaran	Ahvaz
14:30 DST+03:30				Attendance: 1,000

17 November 2016 81	Shahrdari Mahshahr	(w/o)	Gostaresh Foolad	Mahshahr
17:00 DST+03:30
Note: Shahrdari Mahshahr withdrew

18 November 2016 82	Aluminium Arak	1–2 (a.e.t.)	Sepahan	Arak
17:00 DST+03:30	Bakhtiari 95'		Alimohammadi 92'; Oliveira 108'	Attendance: 12,000

18 November 2016 83	Naft Masjed Soleyman	1–2	Saipa	Masjed Soleyman
17:00 DST+03:30	Kianifar 41' (pen.)		Rezaei 45'; Khodaei Asl 80' (o.g.)	Attendance: 5,000

18 November 2016 84	Esteghlal	0–0 (a.e.t.) (5–3 p)	Saba Qom	Tehran
17:00 DST+03:30				Attendance: 25,000

18 November 2016 85	Tractor Sazi	2–0	New Bargh Fars	Tabriz
17:00 DST+03:30	Nouri 39'; Hatami 62'			Attendance: 4,000

18 November 2016 86	Zob Ahan	3–2 (a.e.t.)	Machine Sazi	Isfahan
17:00 DST+03:30	Bengtson 16'; Abbasi 56'; Shekari 119'		Ghaseminejad 46', 75'

== See also ==
- Iran Pro League 2016–17
- Azadegan League 2016–17
- Iran Football's 2nd Division 2016–17
- Iran Football's 3rd Division 2016–17
- Iranian Super Cup
