= Ghaseminejad (surname) =

Ghaseminejad is a surname. Notable people with the surname include:

- Amin Ghaseminejad (born 1986), Iranian footballer
- Amir Ghaseminejad (born 1985), Iranian judoka
- Mohammad Ghaseminejad (born 1989), Iranian footballer
- Saeed Ghasseminejad (born 1982), Iranian financial economist and political activist
