= Alireza Arjmandian =

Iranian footballer

Personal information
- Date of birth: 25 April 1996 (age 30)
- Place of birth: Tehran, Iran
- Height: 1.76 m (5 ft 9 in)
- Position: Striker

Team information
- Current team: Paykan
- Number: 16

Youth career
- –2016: Moghavemat Tehran

Senior career*
| Years | Team | Apps | (Gls) |
| 2016–2018 | Gostaresh Foulad | 15 | (0) |
| 2018–2019 | Machine Sazi | 1 | (0) |
| 2019–2020 | Gol Reyhan Alborz | 30 | (5) |
| 2020–2021 | Mes Rafsanjan | 10 | (0) |
| 2021 | Mes Kerman | 7 | (0) |
| 2021–2022 | Khooshe Talaee | 3 | (3) |
| 2022 | Esteghlal Khuzestan | 8 | (0) |
| 2022–2023 | Mes Shahr-e Babak | 19 | (5) |
| 2023–2024 | Kavir Moghava | | |
| 2024 | Pars Jam | 12 | (1) |
| 2024– | Paykan | 6 | (0) |
- * Club domestic league appearances and goals as of 21 April 2025

Alireza Arjmandian (Persian: علیرضا ارجمندیان; born 25 April 1996) is an Iranian football striker who plays for Paykan in the Azadegan League.
