= Chimba (footballer, born 1983) =

Brazilian footballer

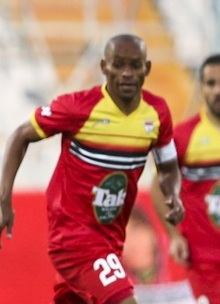
- Chimba with Foolad

Personal information
- Full name: Luciano Pereira Mendes
- Date of birth: 15 October 1983 (age 43)
- Place of birth: São Félix do Coribe, Brazil
- Height: 1.82 m (6 ft 0 in)
- Position: Striker

Youth career
- 2002–2008: Dom Pedro
- 2008: Costa Rica Esporte Clube

Senior career*
Years	Team	Apps	(Gls)
2008–2010	Dom Pedro	0	(0)
2008–2010	→ Luziânia (loan)	2	(3)
2009–2010	→ Brasiliense (loan)	26	(11)
2010	→ Botafogo (loan)	9	(3)
2010	→ América de Natal (loan)	10	(1)
2010–2011	União São João	9	(0)
2011–2012	Linense	14	(5)
2012–2014	Foolad	54	(21)
2014–2016	Sepahan	39	(15)
2016–2017	Gostaresh Foulad	28	(10)
2017–2018	Sanat Naft	29	(12)
2018–2022	Foolad	115	(37)
2022–2024	Mes Rafsanjan	35	(8)
2024–2025	Foolad	30	(1)
- * Club domestic league appearances and goals as of 1 June 2024

Luciano Pereira Mendes (born 15 October 1983), also known as Chimba, is a Brazilian professional footballer who plays as a striker for Persian Gulf Pro League club Foolad.

== Career ==
=== Foolad ===
After spending the previous season at Clube Atlético Linense, Chimba transferred to Foolad in the Iranian Premier League in summer 2012. In the 2013–14 Iran Pro League season, he helped Foolad win the championship by scoring nine league goals. He also scored six goals in the 2014 AFC Champions League.

=== Sepahan ===
On 3 July 2014, Chimba agreed on a two-year contract with Sepahan for $2 million. He officially signed his contract on 4 July and was presented to the fans. He played his first game for Sepahan in their 2–0 win over Paykan. He scored his first goal for Sepahan in the next match, against Gostaresh which he scored the second goal in 2–0 win.

=== Return to Foolad ===
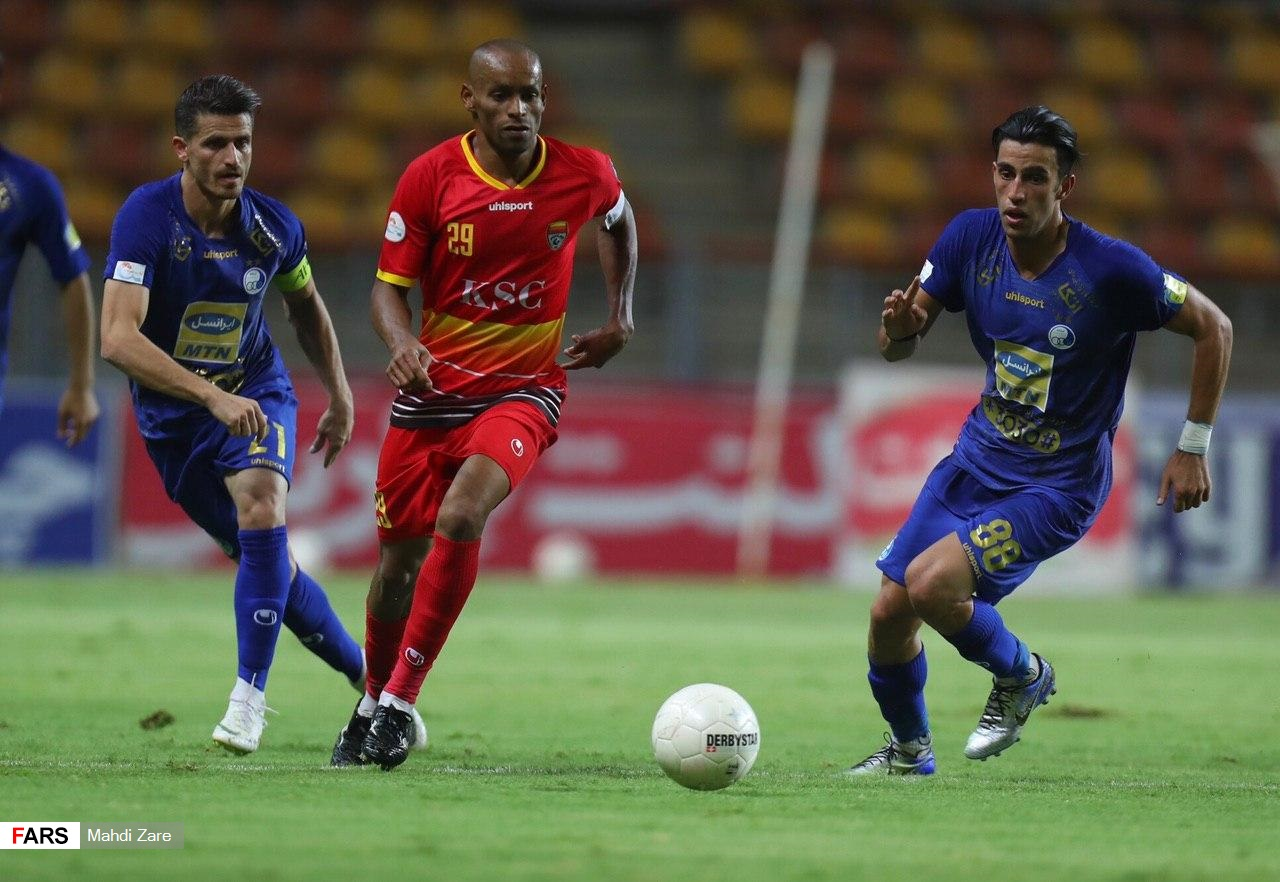
Chimba playing for Foolad in 2020

On 18 June 2019, Chimba returned to his former club Foolad on a one-year contract. In the first season of his presence in this team, he became the top goal scorer of 2018–19 Persian Gulf Pro League together with Kiros Stanlley. Subsequently, He extended his contract and became the best goal scorer in the history of Foolad and the best foreign goal scorer in the history of the Iran Pro League.

== Career statistics ==
As of 18 March 2022

Appearances and goals by club, season and competition
Club	Season	League			National cup (Note: Includes Hazfi Cup.)		Continental		Total	
Club	Season	Division	Apps	Goals	Apps	Goals	Apps	Goals	Apps	Goals
Foolad	2012–13	Persian Gulf Pro League	32	12	1	1	–	–	33	13
Foolad	2013–14	Persian Gulf Pro League	23	9	1	0	5	6	29	15
Sepahan	2014–15	Persian Gulf Pro League	28	11	0	0	0	0	28	11
Sepahan	2015–16	Persian Gulf Pro League	11	5	0	0	1	1	12	6
Gostaresh	2016–17	Persian Gulf Pro League	28	10	0	0	–		28	10
Sanat Naft	2017–18	Persian Gulf Pro League	23	11	3	3	–		26	14
Foolad	2018–19	Persian Gulf Pro League	29	16	1	1	–		30	17
Foolad	2019–20	Persian Gulf Pro League	26	7	0	0	–		26	7
Foolad	2020–21	Persian Gulf Pro League	28	5	5	3	7	4	40	12
Foolad	2021–22	Persian Gulf Pro League	22	11	1	0	0	0	23	11
Career total			252	94	15	9	17	12	283	117

== Honours ==
Foolad

- Persian Gulf Pro League: 2013–14
- Hazfi Cup: 2020–21
- Iranian Super Cup: 2021

Sepahan

- Persian Gulf Pro League: 2014–15

Individual

- Persian Gulf Pro League top scorer: 2018–19
