= Mohammad Ali Faramarzi =

Iranian football defender

Personal information
- Date of birth: 1 January 1994 (age 32)
- Place of birth: Shiraz, Iran
- Height: 1.87 m (6 ft 2 in)
- Position: Left back

Team information
- Current team: Fajr Sepasi
- Number: 27

Youth career
- –2012: Afshin Peyrovani
- 2012–2014: Fajr Sepasi

Senior career*
Years	Team	Apps	(Gls)
2013–2014	Fajr Sepasi	0	(0)
2015–2017	Padideh	17	(0)
2017–2018	Esteghlal Khuzestan	8	(0)
2018	Siah Jamegan	13	(0)
2018–2019	Machine Sazi		
2019	Gol Reyhan	15	(0)
2019–2021	Shahr Khodro	39	(1)
2021–2022	Paykan	13	(0)
2022–2023	Zob Ahan	11	(0)
2024–2025	Shahr Raz	11	(0)
2025–2026	Paykan	31	(1)
2026–	Fajr Sepasi	3	(0)

International career
2011–2012	Iran U20	5	(0)
2013–2016	Iran U23	2	(0)
- * Club domestic league appearances and goals as of 16 April 2025

Mohammad Ali Faramarzi (Persian: محمدعلی فرامرزی; born 1 January 1994) is an Iranian football defender who plays for Fajr Sepasi in the Persian Gulf Pro League.

== Club career ==
=== Padideh ===
Faramarzi joined Padideh late in December 2014 with a three-years contract. He made his debut for Padideh in 2014–15 Iran Pro League against Esteghlal as a starter.

== International career ==
=== U20 ===
He was part of the Iran U–20 team during the 2012 AFC U-19 Championship qualification, 2012 CIS Cup, 2012 AFF U-19 Youth Championship and 2012 AFC U-19 Championship.

=== U23 ===
He was invited to the Iran U-23 training camp by Nelo Vingada in preparation for Incheon 2014, and 2016 AFC U-22 Championship (Summer Olympic qualification).

== Club career statistics ==
As of 26 December 2017.

Club	Division	Season	League		Hazfi Cup		Asia		Total	
Club	Division	Season	Apps	Goals	Apps	Goals	Apps	Goals	Apps	Goals
Fajr Sepasi	Pro League	2013–14	0	0	0	0	–	–	0	0
Fajr Sepasi	Division 1	2014–15	0	0	3	0	–	–	3	0
Padideh	Pro League	2014–15	2	0	0	0	–	–	2	0
Padideh	Pro League	2016-17	26	0	0	0	–	–	26	0
Esteghlal Khuzestan	Pro League	2017-18	8	0	1	0	–	–	9	0
Career totals			36	0	4	0	0	0	40	0
