= Abdollah Hosseini =

Iranian association football player

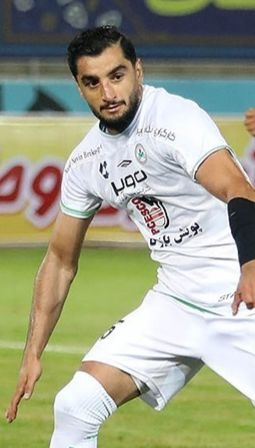

Personal information
- Full name: Seyed Abdollah Hosseini
- Date of birth: 6 July 1990 (age 36)
- Place of birth: Nur, Iran
- Height: 1.83 m (6 ft 0 in)
- Position: Centre back

Youth career
- Foolad Yazd

Senior career*
Years	Team	Apps	(Gls)
2013–2015	Foolad Yazd	4	(0)
2015–2016	Mes Kerman	20	(0)
2016–2019	Padideh	44	(1)
2019–2020	Gol Gohar Sirjan	28	(0)
2020–2021	Zob Ahan	14	(3)
2021–2022	Tractor	15	(0)
2022–2023	Malavan	13	(0)
2023–2024	Paykan	1	(0)
- * Club domestic league appearances and goals

Seyed Abdollah Hosseini (Persian: سیدعبدالله حسینی; born 6 July 1990) is an Iranian former footballer who played as a defender.
