= Reza Nasehi =

Iranian footballer (born 1984)

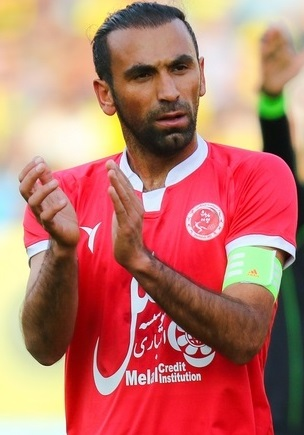

Personal information
- Full name: Mohammad Reza Nasehi
- Date of birth: 12 June 1984 (age 42)
- Place of birth: Mashhad, Iran
- Height: 1.80 m (5 ft 11 in)
- Positions: Midfielder; left back

Youth career
- 1999–2001: Fath Mashhad
- 2002–2004: Aboomoslem

Senior career*
Years	Team	Apps	(Gls)
2004–2010	Aboomoslem	151	(14)
2010–2012	Sepahan	17	(0)
2011	→ Naft Tehran (loan)	16	(2)
2012–2013	Aluminium	29	(5)
2013–2014	Saipa	18	(0)
2014–2019	Padideh	123	(6)
2019–2020	Gol Reyhan Alborz	6	(1)

Managerial career
- 2020–2022: Shahr Khodro (assistant)
- 2023–2024: Shadkam
- 2024: Khooshe Talaee (assistant)
- 2024: Khooshe Talaee
- 2024–2025: Ferdowsi Samen
- * Club domestic league appearances and goals

Mohammad Reza Nasehi (Persian: رضا ناصحی; born 12 June 1984) is an Iranian football coach and a former player.

== Club career ==
Nasehi joined Sepahan in 2010.

Club performance			League		Cup		Continental		Total	
Season	Club	League	Apps	Goals	Apps	Goals	Apps	Goals	Apps	Goals
Iran			League		Hazfi Cup		Asia		Total	
2004–05	Aboomoslem	Pro League	9	0			–	–		
2005–06	Aboomoslem	Pro League	26	1			–	–		
2006–07	Aboomoslem	Pro League	24	2			–	–		
2007–08	Aboomoslem	Pro League	31	1	2	0	–	–	33	1
2008–09	Aboomoslem	Pro League	30	2	2	1	–	–	32	3
2009–10	Aboomoslem	Pro League	31	8			–	–		
2010–11	Sepahan	Pro League	4	0	1	0	0	0	5	0
2010–11	Naft Tehran	Pro League	16	2	0	0	–	–	16	2
2011–12	Sepahan	Pro League	13	0	0	0	0	0	13	0
2012–13	Aluminium	Pro League	28	5	0	0	–	–	28	5
2013–14	Saipa	Pro League	18	0	0	0	–	–	18	0
2014–15	Padideh	Pro League	2	0	0	0	–	–	2	0
Career total			232	21			0	0		

== Honours ==
=== Club ===
Sepahan

- Iranian Pro League: 2010–11, 2011–12
