= Mehran Amiri =

Iranian midfielder

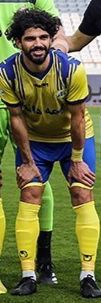

Personal information
- Date of birth: 28 January 1994 (age 32)
- Place of birth: Semirom, Iran
- Height: 1.74 m (5 ft 8 1/2 in)
- Position: Midfielder

Team information
- Current team: Nassaji Mazandaran
- Number: 8

Senior career*
Years	Team	Apps	(Gls)
2013–2016	Giti Pasand	56	(0)
2016	Saba Qom	10	(0)
2017–2018	Rayka Babol	28	(0)
2018–2019	Padideh	5	(0)
2019	Gol Reyhan Alborz	11	(0)
2019–2020	Mes Kerman	26	(0)
2020–2022	Naft Masjed Soleyman	42	(0)
2022–2023	Kheybar Khorramabad	24	(0)
2023–2024	Mes Kerman	11	(1)
2024	Shahin Bandar Ameri	10	(0)
2024–2025	Sanat Naft	27	(0)
2025–	Nassaji Mazandaran	7	(0)
- * Club domestic league appearances and goals as of 21 April 2025

Mehran Amiri (Persian: مهران امیری; born 28 January 1994) is an Iranian midfielder who plays for Iranian football club Nassaji Mazandaran in the Azadegan League.
