= Mohammad Ghanbari =

Iranian footballer (born 1995)

Personal information
- Date of birth: 2 June 1995 (age 31)
- Place of birth: Tabriz, Iran
- Height: 1.88 m (6 ft 2 in)
- Position: Centre-back

Team information
- Current team: Paykan
- Number: 25

Youth career
- –2016: Tractor

Senior career*
Years	Team	Apps	(Gls)
2016–2018	Shahrdari Tabriz	25	(0)
2018–2019	Padideh	3	(0)
2019	Gol Reyhan	0	(0)
2019	Elmoadab Tabriz	13	(2)
2020–2022	Fajr Sepasi	48	(0)
2022–2023	Sanat Naft	12	(0)
2023–2025	Shahr Raz	33	(1)
2025–	Paykan	3	(0)
- * Club domestic league appearances and goals as of 21 April 2025

Mohammad Ghanbari (Persian: محمد قنبری, born 2 June 1995) is an Iranian football player who plays for Paykan in the Azadegan League.
