= Farshad Hashemi =

Iranian footballer

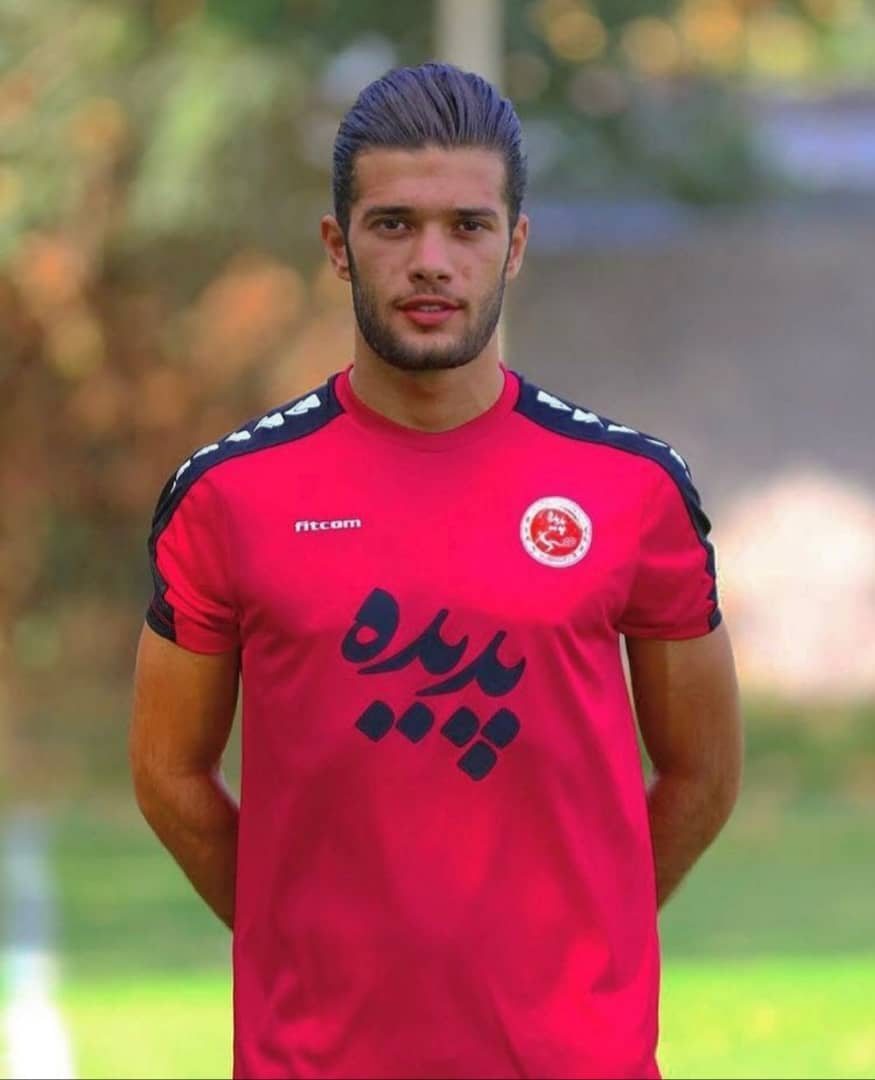

Personal information
- Date of birth: 20 January 1997 (age 29)
- Place of birth: Tehran, Iran
- Height: 1.83 m (6 ft 0 in)
- Position: Attacking midfielder

Youth career
- 2012–2016: Saipa

Senior career*
Years	Team	Apps	(Gls)
2016–2017	Siah Jamegan	3	(0)
2017–2018	Naft Tehran	12	(0)
2018–2019	Padideh	0	(0)
2019–2022	Saipa	5	(0)
2022–2024	Nirooye Zamini		
2024–2025	Damash Gilan	13	(0)
- * Club domestic league appearances and goals as of 3 January 2025

Farshad Hashemi (Persian: فرشاد هاشمی; born 20 January 1997) is an Iranian professional footballer who plays as a midfielder.

== Career ==
=== Siah Jamegan ===
Mosleh played for Saipa before moving to Siah Jamegan in summer of 2016.
