= Abouzar Safarzadeh =

Iranian footballer

Personal information
- Date of birth: 24 December 1995 (age 30)
- Place of birth: Shiraz, Iran
- Height: 1.77 m (5 ft 9 1/2 in)
- Positions: Winger; attacking midfielder

Team information
- Current team: Kheybar Khorramabad
- Number: 77

Youth career
- –2016: Fajr Sepasi

Senior career*
Years	Team	Apps	(Gls)
2016–2018	Fajr Sepasi	19	(6)
2018–2019	Zob Ahan	14	(0)
2019–2020	Shahin Bushehr	12	(0)
2020	Mes Kerman	14	(1)
2020–2022	Shahr Khodro	34	(0)
2022–2023	Vanpars	18	(5)
2023–2026	Malavan	68	(2)
2026–	Kheybar Khorramabad	9	(0)
- * Club domestic league appearances and goals as of 18 April 2025

Abouzar Safarzadeh (Persian: صفرزاده; born 24 December 1995) is an Iranian football midfielder who plays for Kheybar Khorramabad in the Persian Gulf Pro League.

== Club career ==
=== Club career statistics ===
As of 1 May 2018

Club performance			League		Cup		Continental		Total	
Club	League	Season	Apps	Goals	Apps	Goals	Apps	Goals	Apps	Goals
Iran			League		Hazfi Cup		Asia		Total	
Fajr Sepasi	Azadegan League	2016–17	3	0	0	0	–	–	3	0
Fajr Sepasi	Azadegan League	2017–18	16	6	2	1	–	–	18	7
Zob Ahan	Pro League	2018–19	14	0	1	1	1	0	16	1
Career Total			33	6	3	2	1	0	37	8
