= Hossein Mehraban =

Iranian footballer

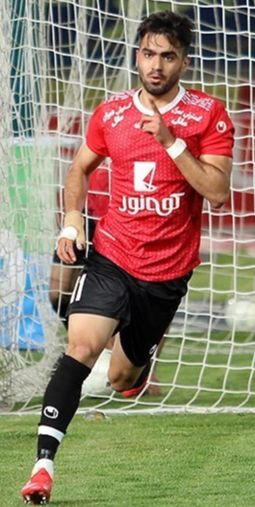

Personal information
- Date of birth: 12 May 1996 (age 30)
- Place of birth: Mashhad, Iran
- Height: 1.83 m (6 ft 0 in)
- Position: Striker

Team information
- Current team: Havadar
- Number: 75

Youth career
- 2011–2013: Tablighat Asar Mashhad
- 2013–2014: Aboomoslem
- 2014: Mahram Mashhad
- 2014: Padideh

Senior career*
Years	Team	Apps	(Gls)
2014–2021	Shahr Khodro	111	(16)
2021–2023	Fajr Sepasi	50	(9)
2023–2024	Mes Rafsanjan	13	(0)
2024–	Havadar	14	(0)

International career
2011–2013	Iran U17	7	(1)
2013–2014	Iran U20	4	(1)
- * Club domestic league appearances and goals as of 16 April 2025

Hossein Mehraban (Persian: حسین مهربان; born 12 May 1996) is an Iranian football forward who plays for Havadar in the Persian Gulf Pro League.

== Club career ==
=== Padideh ===
He joined Padideh in November 2014 with three-years contract. He made his debut for Padideh in 2014–15 Iran Pro League against Esteghlal Khuzestan as substitute for Bahodir Nasimov.

== Personal life ==
On 23 February 2026, while playing for Havadar, Mehraban could be seen refusing to celebrate a goal scored by his teammate Amin Ghaseminejad against Fard Alborz, in solidarity with those killed in the 2025–2026 Iranian protests.

== International career ==
=== Under–17 ===
Mehraban participated with the Iran national under-17 football team in the 2013 FIFA U-17 World Cup.

=== Under–20 ===
He was invited to the Iran national under-20 football team by Ali Doustimehr to participating in the 2014 AFC U-19 Championship.

== Club career statistics ==
As of 5 March 2015

Club	Division	Season	League		Hazfi Cup		Asia		Total	
Club	Division	Season	Apps	Goals	Apps	Goals	Apps	Goals	Apps	Goals
Padideh	Pro League	2014–15	1	0	0	0	–	–	1	0
Career Totals			1	0	0	0	0	0	1	0
