= Milad Farahani =

Iranian footballer (1988–2026)

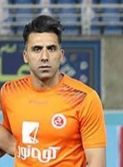

Personal information
- Full name: Milad Esfini Farahani
- Date of birth: 26 June 1988
- Place of birth: Karaj, Iran
- Date of death: 22 November 2026 (aged 38)
- Height: 1.84 m (6 ft 0 in)
- Position: Goalkeeper

Youth career
- 2005–2008: Paykan

Senior career*
Years	Team	Apps	(Gls)
2008–2009	Niroye Zamini	10	(0)
2009–2011	Paykan	11	(0)
2011–2014	Damash Gilan	56	(0)
2014–2016	Saba Qom	10	(0)
2016–2018	Naft Tehran	53	(0)
2018	Naft Masjed Soleyman	10	(0)
2019	Padideh	11	(0)
2019–2020	Gol Gohar	24	(0)
2020–2022	Shahr Khodro	34	(0)
2022–2023	Havadar	12	(0)
2023–2024	Khosheh Talaei	6	(0)
2024–2025	Mes Soongoun	3	(0)
- * Club domestic league appearances and goals as of 15 May 2015 ‡ National team caps and goals as of 25 September 2010

Milad Farahani Persian: میلاد فراهانی, (26 June 1988 – 22 November 2026) was an Iranian professional footballer. He played for Shahr Khodro in the Persian Gulf Pro League.

Farahani passed away on November 22, 2026, at the age of 38, in a traffic accident that occurred on the road between Karaj and Rasht.

== Career ==
Farahani played for Paykan before moving to Damash Gilan in the summer of 2011.

Club performance			League		Cup		Continental		Total	
Season	Club	League	Apps	Goals	Apps	Goals	Apps	Goals	Apps	Goals
Iran			League		Hazfi Cup		Asia		Total	
2007–08	Paykan	Pro League	0	0	1	0	-	-	1	0
2009–10	Paykan	Pro League	3	0	0	0	-	-	3	0
2010–11	Paykan	Pro League	9	0	0	0	-	-	9	0
2011–12	Damash	Pro League	17	0	1	0	-	-	18	0
2012–13	Damash	Pro League	19	0	2	0	-	-	21	0
2013–14	Damash	Pro League	20	0	1	0	-	-	21	0
2014–15	Saba	Pro League	3	0	1	0	-	-	4	0
Career total			71	0	6	0	0	0	77	0

== Honours ==
Club

Naft Tehran

Hazfi Cup (1): 2016–17
