= Ali Nabizadeh =

Iranian association football player

Personal information
- Date of birth: 5 March 1996 (age 30)
- Place of birth: Mashhad, Iran
- Height: 1.80 m (5 ft 11 in)
- Position: Centre midfielder

Team information
- Current team: Nassaji Mazandaran
- Number: 6

Youth career
- –2017: Padideh

Senior career*
Years	Team	Apps	(Gls)
2017–2018	Persepolis Mashhad	0	(0)
2018–2020	Padideh	18	(0)
2020–2021	Zob Ahan	5	(0)
2021–2022	Fajr Sepasi	32	(1)
2022–2023	Mes Shahr-e Babak	19	(0)
2023–2024	Naft va Gaz Gachsaran	27	(3)
2024–2025	Fajr Sepasi	28	(3)
2025–	Nassaji Mazandaran	8	(0)
- * Club domestic league appearances and goals as of 7 December 2025

Ali Nabizadeh (Persian: علی نبی زاده; born 5 March 1996) is an Iranian footballer who plays as a midfielder for Nassaji Mazandaran in the Persian Gulf Pro League.
