= Yousef Behzadi =

Iranian footballer (born 1990)

Personal information
- Full name: Yousef Behzadi Kalsh
- Date of birth: 29 June 1990 (age 36)
- Place of birth: Tehran, Iran
- Height: 1.85 m (6 ft 1 in)
- Position: Goalkeeper

Team information
- Current team: Damash Gilan
- Number: 69

Senior career*
Years	Team	Apps	(Gls)
2012–2013	Rahian	22	(0)
2013–2014	Naft MIS	9	(0)
2014–2015	Esteghlal Ahvaz	2	(0)
2015–2018	Naft MIS	48	(0)
2018–2019	Padideh	16	(0)
2019–2021	Zob Ahan	16	(0)
2022	Shahr Khodro	9	(0)
2022–2023	Fajr Sepasi	20	(0)
2023–2024	Shahrdari Astara	18	(0)
2024–	Damash Gilan	11	(0)
- * Club domestic league appearances and goals as of 16 April 2025

Yousef Behzadi Kalash, known as Yousef Behzadi (Persian: یوسف بهزادی; born 29 June 1990) is an Iranian footballer who plays as a goalkeeper for Damash Gilan in the Azadegan League.

== Honours ==
=== Club ===
Naft MIS

- Runner-up Azadegan League: 2017–18
