= Alireza Marzban =

Iranian football manager (born 1958)

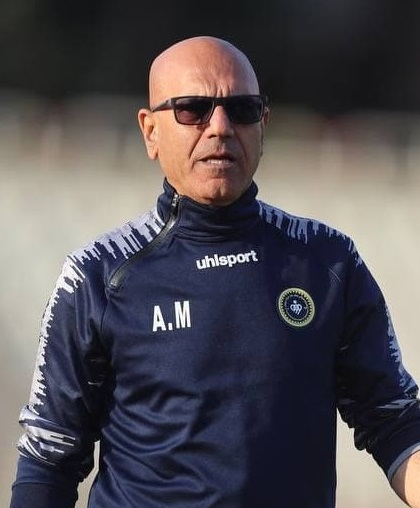
- Marzban in 2021

Personal information
- Date of birth: 26 May 1958 (age 68)
- Place of birth: Azna, Lorestan, Iran
- Height: 1.82 m (6 ft 0 in)

Managerial career
- Years: Team
- 2000–2001: 1.FC Eschborn (assistant)
- 2001–2004: 1.FC Eschborn
- 2005–2006: KSV Baunatal
- 2007–2008: Persepolis (assistant)
- 2008–2009: DAC Dunajská Streda (assistant)
- 2009–2010: Steel Azin (assistant)
- 2010–2011: Montenegro (assistant)
- 2011–2012: Sepahan (assistant)
- 2013–2014: Padideh (assistant)
- 2014–2015: Padideh
- 2015–2016: Paykan
- 2016–2017: Khoneh Be Khoneh
- 2017: Siah Jamegan
- 2017–2018: Shahrdari Mahshahr
- 2018–2019: Naft Masjed Soleyman
- 2020–2022: Sepahan (assistant)

Alireza Marzban (Persian: علیرضا مرزبان; born 26 May 1958) is an Iranian football manager. He works as an assistant in Sepahan in Persian Gulf Pro League.

== Early life ==
He was born on 26 May 1958 in Azna and moved to Germany in 1995.

== Coaching career ==
After graduating from university, he began working at 1.FC Eschborn as a chief scout. Two years later, he became the team's assistant coach and was promoted as the team manager in 2001, a post he kept until 2004. In July 2005, he was appointed as the manager of KSV Baunatal but was sacked at the end of the season. After Afshin Ghotbi appointed as head coach of Persepolis, he was named as one of his assistants, alongside he worked as fitness trainer at the club. After resignation of Ghotbi, he left the team to become DAC Dunajská Streda's assistant coach. He also works with Hamid Estili as his assistant in Steel Azin. He was Montenegro national football team's assistant to Zlatko Kranjčar from 2009 until 2010. After Kranjčar became head coach of Sepahan in November 2011, he was named as his first team coach. He left the team after a series of problems with the management in December 2012. He has worked in IRIB's Varzesh channel as a football analyst. On 15 August 2013, he became assistant coach of Akbar Misaghian at Azadegan League side Padideh Shandiz. After Misaghian resigned despite promoting Padideh to the Iran Pro League, Marzban was named as his successor.

== Personal life ==
On 10 January 2026, Marzban sent an exclusive message to Iran International supporting the 2025–2026 Iranian protests along with several other Iranian coaches across football.

=== Statistics ===
| Nat | Team | From | To | Record | | | | | | | |
| Nat | Team | From | To | G | W | D | L | Win % | GF | GA | +/- |
|---|---|---|---|---|---|---|---|---|---|---|---|
| (Germany) | 1.FC Eschborn | December 2001 | June 2004 | 32 | 15 | 7 | 10 | 46.88 | 34 | 24 | +10 |
| (Germany) | KSV Baunatal | July 2005 | July 2006 | 21 | 8 | 1 | 12 | 38.10 | 18 | 19 | –1 |
| (Iran) | Padideh | June 2014 | June 2015 | 34 | 9 | 16 | 9 | 26.47 | 37 | 37 | 0 |
| (Iran) | Paykan | July 2015 | May 2016 | 38 | 18 | 16 | 4 | 47.37 | 50 | 29 | +21 |
| (Iran) | Khoneh Be Khoneh | July 2016 | January 2017 | 19 | 8 | 7 | 4 | 42.11 | 25 | 14 | +11 |
| (Iran) | Meshki Pooshan | October 2017 | December 2017 | 4 | 0 | 1 | 3 | 0.00 | 1 | 4 | –3 |
| (Iran) | Naft Masjed Soleyman | September 2018 | April 2019 | 16 | 4 | 6 | 6 | 25.00 | 12 | 20 | –8 |

== Honours ==
=== Assistant Manager ===
1.FC Eschborn

- Hessen-Mitte: 2000 (Runner-up)

Persepolis

- Iran Pro League (1): 2007–08

Sepahan

- Iran Pro League (1): 2011–12

Padideh

- Azadegan League (1): 2013–14

=== Manager ===
1.FC Eschborn

- Hessenliga (1): 2003
- Hessen-Mitte: 2001 (Runner-up)

Paykan

- Azadegan League (1): 2015–16

=== Individual ===
- IFCA Best Azadegan League Manager (1): 2015–16
