= Samuel Sarfo =

Ghanaian footballer

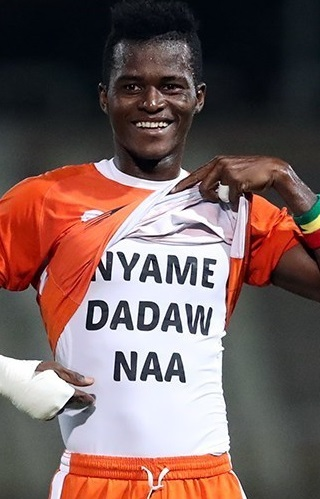
- Sarfo with Saipa in 2018

Personal information
- Date of birth: 12 August 1990 (age 36)
- Place of birth: Nsuta, Ghana
- Height: 1.82 m (6 ft 0 in)
- Position: Defender

Team information
- Current team: Najran
- Number: 12

Youth career
- Cantonments

Senior career*
Years	Team	Apps	(Gls)
2008–2018	Liberty Professionals		
2018–2019	Saipa	31	(0)
2019–2022	Al-Khaleej	105	(11)
2022–2023	Al-Tadamon		
2023–2024	Al-Taraji	23	(2)
2024–	Najran		

International career^{‡}
2017–	Ghana	2	(0)
- * Club domestic league appearances and goals as of 16:11, 19 June 2019 (UTC) ‡ National team caps and goals as of 09:14, 10 January 2019 (UTC)

Samuel Sarfo (born 12 August 1990) is a Ghanaian footballer who plays for Saudi club Najran and the Ghana national team as a defender.

== Club career ==
Born in Nsuta, Sarfo played at Cantonments as a youth. He later played for Liberty Professionals, combining his playing career with his job as a policeman. On 6 February 2018, Sarfo signed an 18-month contract with Iranian club Saipa.

On 5 July 2022, Sarfo joined Kuwaiti club Al-Tadamon.

On 21 June 2023, Sarfo joined Saudi club Al-Taraji.

On 10 September 2024, Sarfo joined Saudi Second Division side Najran.

== Career statistics ==
As of 7 April 2019

Club	Division	Season	League		National Cup		Other		Total	
Club	Division	Season	Apps	Goals	Apps	Goals	Apps	Goals	Apps	Goals
Saipa	Pro League	2017–18	6	0	0	0	0	0	6	0
Saipa	Pro League	2018–19	19	0	0	0	2	1	21	1
Saipa	Career total		25	0	0	0	2	1	27	1

== International career ==
Sarfo made his international debut for Ghana in 2017.

== Honours ==
Al-Khaleej

- First Division: 2021–22
