= São Félix do Coribe =

Coordinates: 13°24′07″S 44°11′42″W

- Municipality
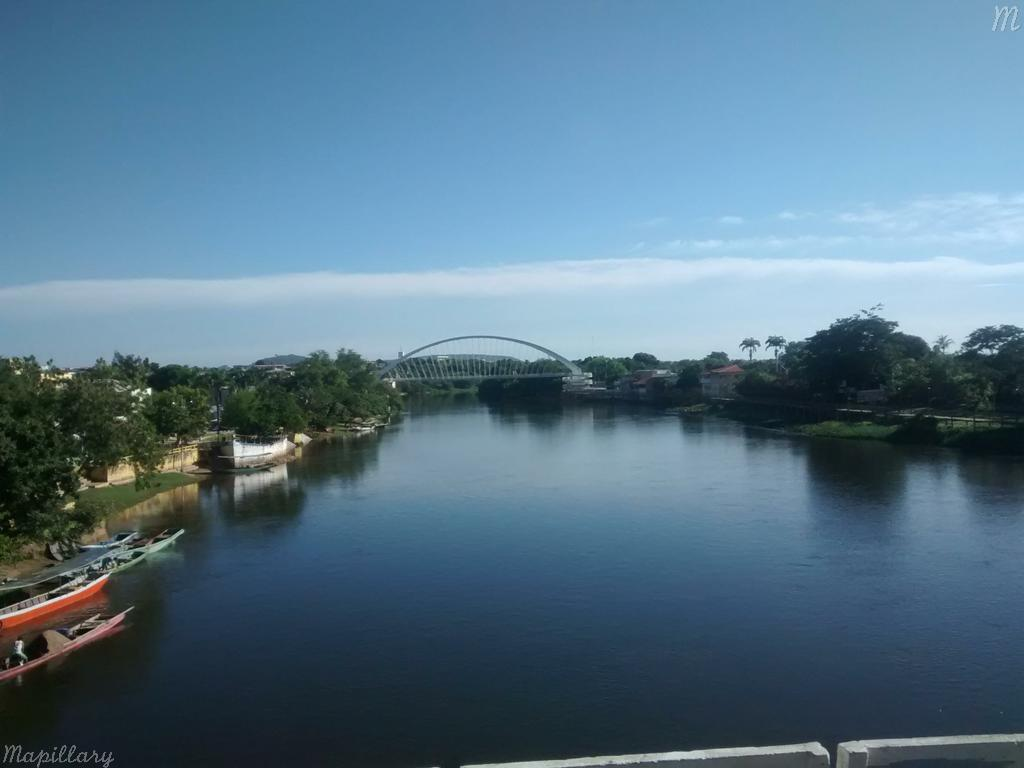

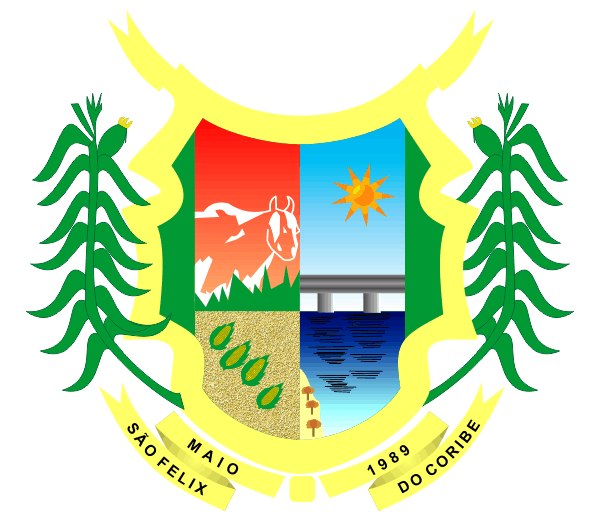
- Flag Coat of arms
- Interactive map of São Félix do Coribe
- Country: Brazil
- Region: Nordeste
- State: Bahia

Population (2020)
  - Total: 15,468
- Time zone: UTC−3 (BRT)

São Félix do Coribe is a municipality in the state of Bahia in the North-East region of Brazil.
