= Emad Mirjavan =

Iranian footballer

Personal information
- Full name: Mirhadi Mirjavan
- Date of birth: 6 July 1988 (age 38)
- Place of birth: Rasht, Iran
- Height: 1.85 m (6 ft 1 in)
- Position: Forward

Team information
- Current team: Naft Masjed Soleyman
- Number: 90

Youth career
- 2007–2009: Sepidrood

Senior career*
Years	Team	Apps	(Gls)
2011–2013	Sepidrood		
2013–2014	Caspian Qazvin	23	(11)
2014–2015	Sepidrood	24	(18)
2015–2016	Aluminium Arak	26	(8)
2016–2017	Sepahan	3	(0)
2017	Oxin Alborz	14	(4)
2017–2018	Sepidrood	23	(2)
2018–2019	Pars Jonoubi	19	(3)
2019–2020	Naft Masjed Soleyman	24	(5)
2020–2021	Mes Rafsanjan	0	(0)
2021–	Naft Masjed Soleyman	0	(0)

International career
2007–2008	Iran U20	3	(0)
- * Club domestic league appearances and goals as of 30 May 2016

Emad Mirjavan (Mirhadi Mirjavan) (born 6 July 1988) is an Iranian footballer who plays as a forward for Naft Masjed Soleyman.
