= Mohammad Ghaseminejad =

Iranian footballer (born 1989)

Personal information
- Full name: Mohammad Ghaseminejad
- Date of birth: March 5, 1989 (age 37)
- Place of birth: Babol, Iran
- Height: 1.80 m (5 ft 11 in)
- Position: Midfielder

Team information
- Current team: Sanat Mes Kerman F.C.
- Number: 8

Senior career*
Years	Team	Apps	(Gls)
- Gahar
–2013	Mes Sarcheshme		
2013–2014	Sanat Naft	17	(1)
2014–2017	Nassaji Mazandaran	69	(7)
2017–2018	Khoneh Be Khoneh	33	(2)
2018–2019	Padideh	23	(2)
2019–2022	Foolad	64	(2)
2022	Paykan F.C.	13	(0)
2022–2023	Sanat Mes Kerman F.C.	22	(1)
2024	F.C. Rayka Babol	13	(0)
2024-	Sanat Mes Kerman F.C.	3	(0)
- * Club domestic league appearances and goals

Mohammad Ghaseminejad (born March 5, 1989) is an Iranian footballer who plays as a midfielder who currently plays for Iranian club Padideh in the Persian Gulf Pro League.

His cousin Amin is also a footballer.

== Honours ==
Foolad

- Hazfi Cup: 2020–21
- Iranian Super Cup: 2021
