= Mohammad Reza Mohajeri =

Iranian football manager (born 1964)

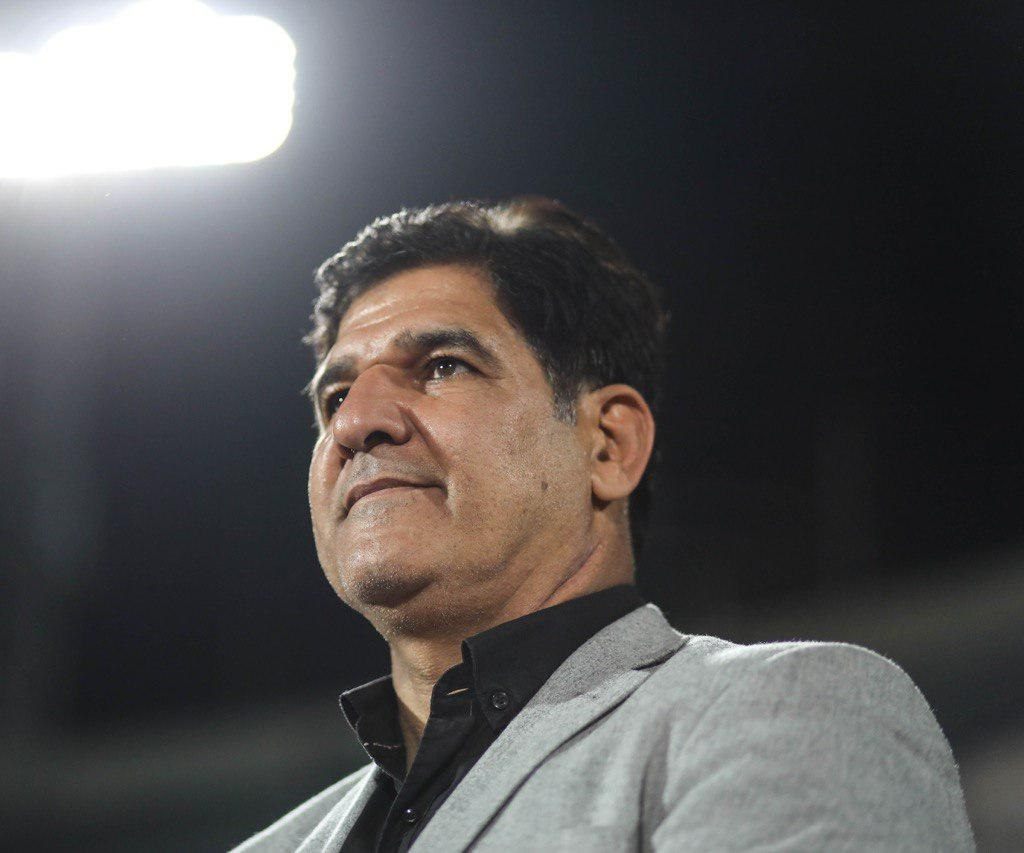
- Mohajeri in 2019

Personal information
- Date of birth: 10 December 1964 (age 61)
- Place of birth: Mashhad, Iran
- Position: Left-back

Senior career*
Years	Team	Apps	(Gls)
1984–1993	Aboomoslem		
1993–1999	Adonis		

Managerial career
- 2006–2007: Esteghlal Ahvaz (assistant)
- 2007: Esteghlal Ahvaz (caretaker)
- 2008–2009: Saba Qom (assistant)
- 2011: Shirin Faraz
- 2011–2015: Siah Jamegan
- 2015–2018: Padideh
- 2018: Tractor (technical director)
- 2018–2019: Machine Sazi
- 2019–2020: Nassaji Mazandaran
- 2020: Machine Sazi
- 2020–2021: Mes Kerman
- 2021: Shahr Khodro
- 2022: Naft M.I.S
- 2023–2024: Kheybar
- 2024–2025: Shams Azar
- 2025–: Nassaji Mazandaran
- * Club domestic league appearances and goals

Mohammad Reza Mohajeri (Persian: محمدرضا مهاجری; born 10 December 1964) is an Iranian football manager and a former player.

== Honours ==
=== Manager honours ===
Siah Jamegan

- Azadegan League (1): 2014–15
- Azadegan League (Runner-up Group A) (1): 2013–14
- Second Division (1): 2012–13
