= Heysam Hashemizadeh =

Iranian footballer

Personal information
- Full name: Seyed Heysam Hashemizadeh
- Date of birth: 20 February 1997 (age 29)
- Place of birth: Ahvaz, Iran
- Height: 1.84 m (6 ft 1/2 in)
- Position: Centre forward

Team information
- Current team: Naft MIS

Youth career
- –2016: Esteghlal Khuzestan
- 2016–2017: Foolad

Senior career*
Years	Team	Apps	(Gls)
2017–2019	Foolad	18	(0)
2019	Naft MIS	8	(1)
2020–2021	Baadraan Tehran	2	(0)
- * Club domestic league appearances and goals

Heysam Hashemizadeh (Persian: هیثم هاشمی‌زاده, born 20 February 1997 in Ahvaz, Iran) is an Iranian footballer who plays as a forward for Iranian club Naft Masjed Soleyman in the Persian Gulf Pro League.

== Honours ==
=== Club ===
Esteghlal Khuzestan

- Persian Gulf Pro League (1) : 2015–16
