= Hossein Baghlani =

Iranian footballer

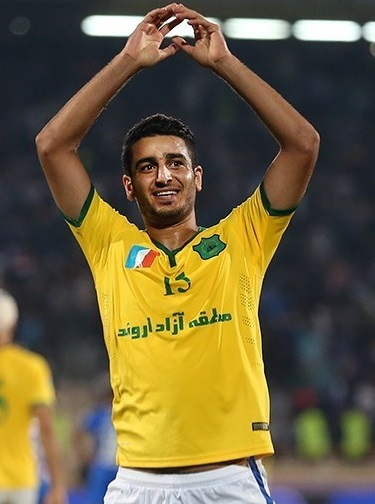

Personal information
- Full name: Hossein Baghlani
- Date of birth: 4 August 1990 (age 36)
- Place of birth: Bandar-e Mahshahr, Iran
- Height: 1.84 m (6 ft 1/2 in)
- Position: Defender

Team information
- Current team: Kheybar
- Number: 15

Youth career
- Sanat Naft Abadan

Senior career*
Years	Team	Apps	(Gls)
2010–2022	Sanat Naft Abadan	162	(17)
2023-	Kheybar	18	(0)
- * Club domestic league appearances and goals

Hossein Baghlani (Persian: حسین بغلانی) is an Iranian footballer who plays for Sanat Naft Abadan in the Persian Gulf Pro League.

== Club career ==
=== Sanat Naft Abadan ===
At the age of 20, Baghlani was signed by Sanat Naft Abadan directly from the youth teams. He scored his first professional goal on 15 October 2011 in a 1–1 draw against Shahin Bushehr. After Sanat Naft was relegated to the Azadegan League in 2013, Baghlani extended his contract and decided to play in the lower division with Sanat Naft.

In 2016 with the help of six goals from Baghlani and after a three-year absence from the Persian Gulf Pro League, Sanat Naft was once again promoted to the top flight.
