= Mojtaba Bijan =

Iranian footballer

Personal information
- Date of birth: November 5, 1987 (age 39)
- Place of birth: Rasht, Iran
- Height: 1.85 m (6 ft 1 in)
- Position: Defender

Team information
- Current team: Shahr Khodro
- Number: 5

Senior career*
Years	Team	Apps	(Gls)
2010–	Esteghlal Ahvaz		
2010–2011	Damash Tehran		
2011–2012	Shahrdari Bandar Abbas		
2012–2013	Haffari Ahvaz		
2013	Aboumoslem Khorasan		
2014–2015	Shahrdari Tabriz		
2015–2016	Machine Sazi Tabriz	26	(0)
2016–2017	Naft Masjed Soleyman	33	(1)
2017	Nassaji Mazandaran	16	(3)
2018–2019	Naft Masjed Soleyman	35	(1)
2019–2021	Nassaji Mazandaran	55	(2)
2021–	Shahr Khodro	23	(2)
2022–	Saipa F.C.		
- * Club domestic league appearances and goals as of 19 December 2015 ‡ National team caps and goals as of 22 January 2016

Mojtaba Bijan (Persian: مجتبی بیژن; born November 5, 1987) is an Iranian football midfielder who plays for Nassaji Mazandaran in Iran Pro League.
