= Daylight saving time in Iran =

Daylight saving time in Iran was the practice of setting the clock forward by one hour between the first day of Farvardin (21–22 March) in the Iranian calendar and the last day of Shahrivar (21–22 September), which has been observed during years 1978–1980, 1991–2005, and 2008–2023.

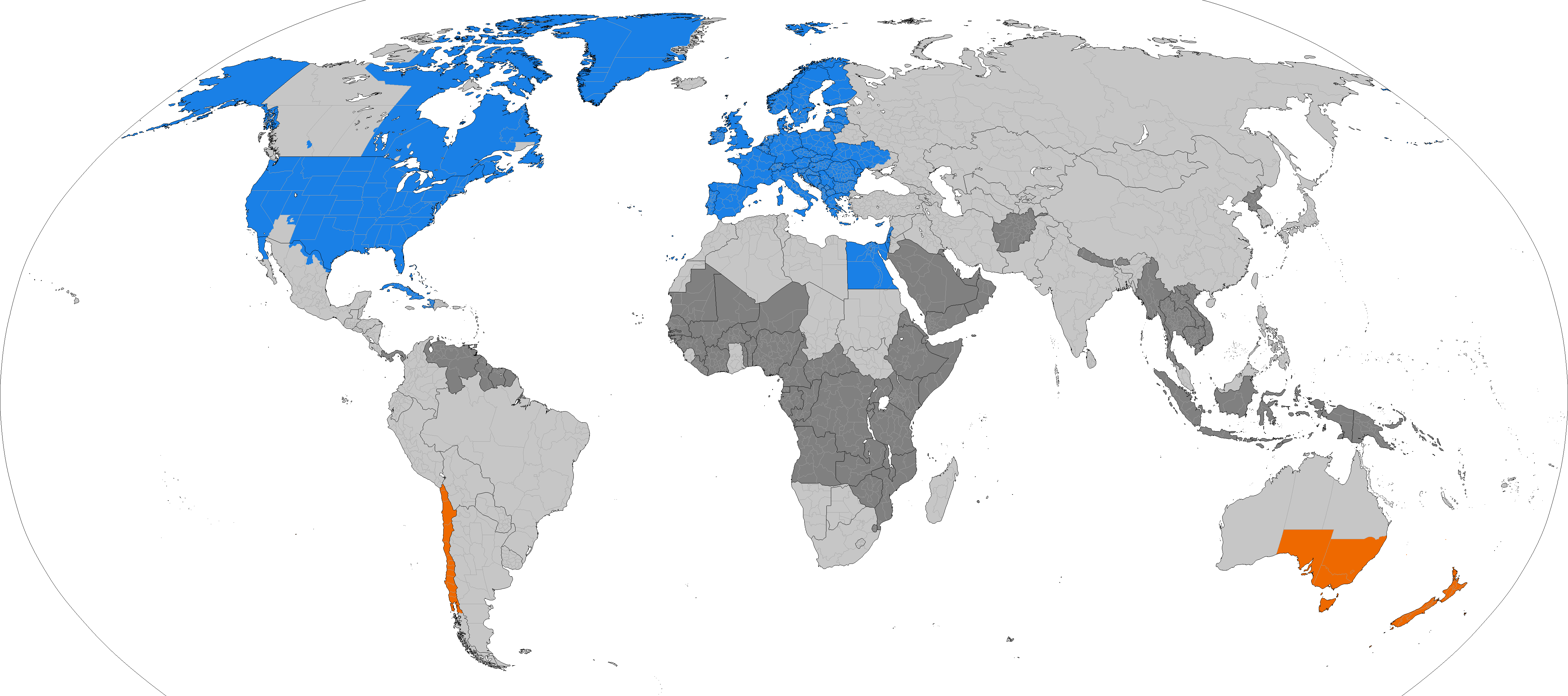
Daylight saving time regions: Northern Hemisphere summer Southern Hemisphere summer Formerly used daylight saving time Never used daylight saving time

== Abolishment ==
In 2006, Iran abolished daylight saving time (DST); however, in September 2007, the Iranian Parliament passed a law restoring DST starting from March 21, 2008, in spite of opposition by the contemporary government.

A number of deputies of the eleventh term of the Parliament drafted a plan to abolish daylight saving time in the country. The plan was approved by the Parliament on 15 March 2022. However, it was rejected by the Guardian Council due to it not clearly determining when this rule must be applied, and not clarifying if the Iranian government had authority to change it or not. After solving these ambiguities, it was confirmed to the Guardian Council, and then this plan was communicated to all ministries, organizations, and institutions by Iranian President Ebrahim Raisi on 22 May 2022. The abolition of daytime saving time was planned to be implemented on 21 March 2023.

However, on 21 September 2022, Iran abolished daylight saving time effective immediately and now observes standard time year-round.

== Restore ==
In May 2025, the Iranian government partially restored daylight saving time in Tehran, despite opposition from the Parliament.

== See also ==
- Daylight saving time
- Iran Standard Time
