= Gol Reyhan Alborz F.C. =

Iranian football club

- Full name: Gol Reyhan Alborz Football Club
- Founded: 2015; 11 years ago
- Stadium: Enghelab Stadium
- Capacity: 15,000
- Owner: Noor credit institution
- Chairman: Mohammad Zare
- Head Coach: Ali Janmaleki
- League: Azadegan League
- 2019-20: Azadegan League, 8th

Gol Reyhan Football Club (Persian: باشگاه فوتبال گل ریحان البرز, Bashgah-e Futbal-e Gâl Reyhan Alberz) is an Iranian football team based in Karaj, Iran, that plays in the Azadegan League.

== Players ==
=== First team squad ===
As of 1 August 2018.

Note: Flags indicate national team as defined under FIFA eligibility rules; some limited exceptions apply. Players may hold more than one non-FIFA nationality.

No.	Pos.	Nation	Player
2	DF	IRN	Moein Ghorbaani
3	DF	IRN	Nima Daaghestaani
4	DF	IRN	Emaad Ghaasemi
5	DF	IRN	Hossein kheiri
6	DF	IRN	Milad Abtahi
11	FW	IRN	ilia modirroosta
12	GK	IRN	Ali shahed
14	DF	IRN	Amirreza gholizadeh
17	FW	IRN	Ali Zeinali
19	MF	IRN	Mohsen Sefid Choghaei
20	DF	IRN	Nima Daghestani
21	MF	IRN	Majid Tajik
22	MF	IRN	Mahmoud Shafiei
23	DF	IRN	Mohammad Ali Faramarzi
25	GK	IRN	Mehran Ghadiri

No.	Pos.	Nation	Player
26	FW	IRN	Hamidreza Aliasgari
29	MF	IRN	Parsa Seyed Momen
30	DF	IRN	Mohammadreza Khoshbin
35	FW	IRN	Soheil Fadakar
39	DF	IRN	Davoud Rajabi
40	DF	IRN	Mohammad Ghanbari
70	FW	IRN	Yaser Feyzi
76	DF	IRN	Yashar Ahmadi
77	FW	IRN	Mehrdad Rezaei
78	FW	IRN	Amirhassan Jafari
79	FW	IRN	Arshia Abbasi
80	FW	IRN	Mehdi Niyayeshpour
88	MF	IRN	Mehran Amiri
90	FW	IRN	Iman Zakizadeh
99	FW	IRN	Alireza Arjmandian

For recent transfers, see List of Iranian football transfers summer 2018.

=== Current technical staff ===
Name	Position
Head coach	(Iran) Mahmoud Shafe'i
Assistant coaches	(Iran) Ezzat Norouzi (Iran) Bahador Abdi
Team manager	(Iran)
