= Amin Ghaseminejad =

Iranian footballer

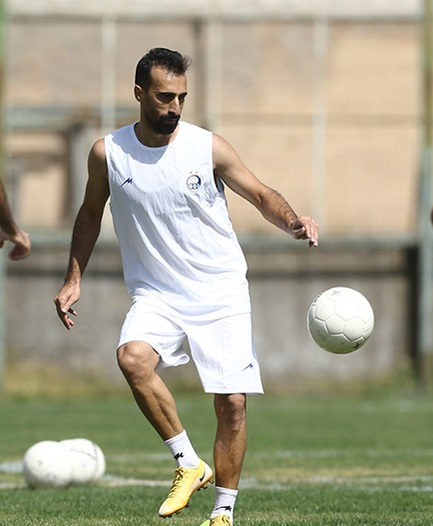
- Ghaseminejad training with Esteghlal at 29 Sep. 2021

Personal information
- Date of birth: 22 November 1986 (age 39)
- Place of birth: Babol, Iran
- Height: 1.82 m (6 ft 0 in)
- Position: Forward

Team information
- Current team: Shams Azar
- Number: 89

Senior career*
Years	Team	Apps	(Gls)
2007–2013	Persepolis Qaem Shahr		
2013–2015	Giti Pasand	31	(9)
2015–2017	Machine Sazi	63	(18)
2017–2021	Shahr Khodro	106	(29)
2021–2022	Esteghlal	10	(1)
2022	→ Gol Gohar (loan)	10	(0)
2022–2023	Gol Gohar	24	(3)
2023–2024	Havadar	22	(5)
2024–2025	Foolad	9	(0)
2025–	Shams Azar	9	(0)
- * Club domestic league appearances and goals as of 2 May 2025

Amin Ghaseminejad (Persian: امین قاسمی نژاد; born 22 November 1986) is an Iranian professional footballer who plays as a forward for Persian Gulf Pro League club Shams Azar.

== Personal life ==
On 31 December 2025, Ghaseminejad publicly supported the 2025–2026 Iranian protests. On 23 February, while playing for Havadar S.C., he refused to celebrate a goal he scored against Fard Alborz in solidarity with those killed in the protests.
