= Shahr Khodro F.C. =

Iranian football club

- Full name: Shahr Khodro Football Club
- Nicknames: Khorasan Cheetahs (Persian: یوزهای خراسان, Yuzhay-e Xorasan)
- Founded: 2013
- Dissolved: August 21, 2022
- Ground: Imam Reza Stadium
- Capacity: 27,700
- Owner: Farhad Hamidavi
- Chairman: Masoud Moamaei
- Head Coach: Davoud Seyed-Abbasi
- Website: fc.shahrkhodro.com
Home colours	Away colours

Shahr Khodro Football Club (Persian: باشگاه فوتبال شهر خودرو, Bashgah-e Futbal-e Shahr Xodro), previously known as Padideh, was an Iranian football club based in Mashhad, Razavi Khorasan, that competed in the Persian Gulf Pro League. The club was founded in 2013 and was known as Padideh Khorasan Football Club (Persian: باشگاه فوتبال پديده خراسان, Bashgah-e Futbal-e Padide Xorasan) between 2013 and 2019, and between March and August 2021.

The football team plays its home games at the Imam Reza Stadium which has a seating capacity of 27,700. The club is owned and supported by the Shahr Khodro Company.

== History ==
=== Mes Sarcheshmeh years ===
==== Azadegan League ====
Mes Sarcheshmeh was owned by Kerman's largest Copper producer "Sanate Mes Kerman", the same company that owned Mes Kerman. Mes Sarcheshmeh was founded in 1998 together with several other clubs by the Copper company of Kerman. The club experienced great success in the years 2008 to 2011, being promoted twice during this period.

After a third-place finish in the 2007–2008 season, they gained promotion the following year, finishing in first place. While being tipped as favourites for the drop, they beat the odds and finished in a respectable fifth spot. The following season proved to be their last, in the Azadegan League 1 as they won the league due to their better goal difference compared to runners up Aluminium Hormozgan. This meant that Mes Sarcheshme had been promoted to the Iranian Premier League for the first time.

==== Promotion to the Iran Pro League ====
Mes Sarcheshme was the second team owned by "Sanat Mes Kerman" to have reached the Premier League, the other team is Mes Kerman. Mes Sarcheshme could not make an impact in the IPL and were relegated. In July 2013, the club was moved from Kerman to Mashhad and renamed to Padideh Shandiz for two seasons.

=== Padideh Shandiz ===
When 2012–13 season ended, Mes Sarcheshmeh had given up from administrating a professional football club. They sold their football club to Padideh Shandiz as of July 2013. New owners moved the club to Mashhad and introduced Akbar Misaghian as club boss. Padideh was promoted to the Persian Gulf Pro League in the following season, and were crowned champions of the Azadegan League, after beating Naft Masjed Soleyman 1–0 in the final. Before their first season in the Iran Pro League, Padideh made several big name signings, namely Reza Enayati and Milan Jovanović. Padideh made the semi–final of the 2014–15 Hazfi Cup but lost to Naft Tehran on penalties.

Shahr Khodro defeated Qatar's Al Sailiya FC 5–4 in a penalty shootout after a scoreless draw at the Abdullah Bin Khalifa Stadium on Tuesday to secure a place at 2020 ACL for the first time in history. Shahr Khodro became the 13th club from Iran to reach the group stage.

== Logo, color and kit ==
=== Logo ===
Shahr Khodro Football Club has a red and yellow logo with the image of a cheetah on it; The main color of the logo is red and the football ball symbol at the bottom of the cheetah image also indicates the importance of football and the main discipline of the club.

2013–2019

2019–2021

2021

2021–2022

=== Color ===
Shahr Khodro is generally known for its red color; This color is also used in the logo and the shirt.

=== Kit ===
The first kit of this team is red and the second kit is usually white.

== Stadium ==
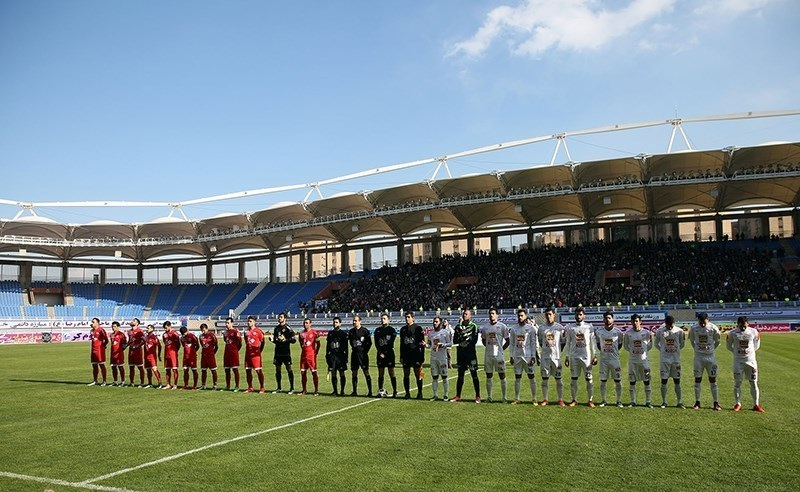
Padideh vs Tractor match. Imam Reza Stadium completed in January 2017 and was opened on 14 March 2017 on the day of Chaharshanbe Suri.

They currently play at Imam Reza Stadium. The stadium is in an area of Mashhad that belongs to the Astan Quds Razavi (AQR), a charitable foundation which manages the Imam Reza shrine. The stadium is located in the eastern side of the 2,000-hectare (7.7 sq mi) AQR Sports Complex and has a 5.4-hectare (13-acre) area. In addition to the football stadium, the complex has ten sport salons including tennis, basketball and volleyball arenas, swimming pools and water collection. The complex also has amphitheater, conference hall, dining hall, museum and coaching classes.

== Rivals ==
The Mashhad derby (Persian: شهرآورد مشهد) also known as the Razavi Khorasan derby (Persian: شهرآورد خراسان رضوی) is a football local derby match between the four most popular clubs from Mashhad: Aboomoslem and Payam and Siah Jamegan and Padideh. Back in the 1980s and early 1990s was Iran's second most important derby after the Tehran derby. Nowadays it has lost its status to more popular derbies such as Isfahan derby, Ahvaz derby, Tabriz derby, Guilan derby, Shiraz derby and Mazandaran derby.

== Players ==
=== First-team squad ===
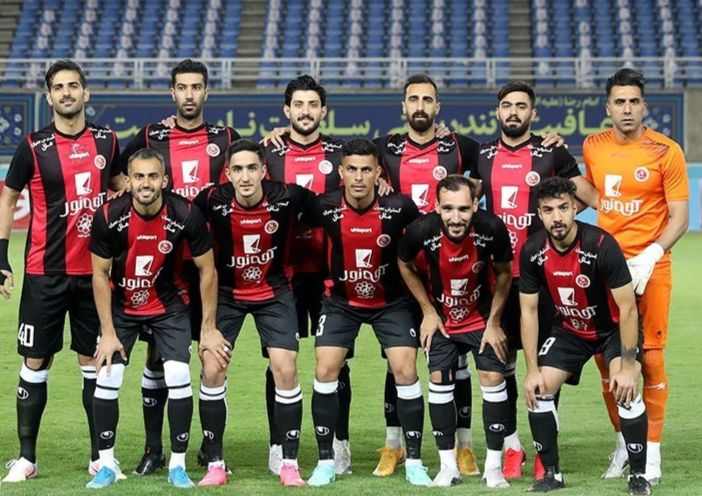
Padideh Khorasan FC - June 2021

Note: Flags indicate national team as defined under FIFA eligibility rules; some limited exceptions apply. Players may hold more than one non-FIFA nationality.

No.	Pos.	Nation	Player
1	GK	IRN	Saeid Jalali Rad
2	DF	IRN	Mojtaba Moghtadaei
3	DF	IRN	Mohammad Hossein Heydari
4	DF	IRN	Ehsan Hosseini (on loan from Persepolis)
6	MF	IRN	Mohammad Mohammadzadeh^{U25}
7	FW	IRN	Rahman Jafari
8	MF	IRN	Ali Taheran ^{U25}
9	FW	IRN	Mehrdad Bayrami
10	FW	IRN	Hossein Mehraban
11	FW	IRN	Amir Hasan Jafari^{U23}
12	GK	IRN	Babak Salamat ^{U23}
14	FW	IRN	Abouzar Safarzadeh
16	DF	IRN	Alireza Asadabadi ^{U21}
17	DF	IRN	Pouriya Gholami
18	MF	IRN	Mohsen Rabikhah

No.	Pos.	Nation	Player
19	MF	IRN	Milad Kamandani
20	DF	IRN	Mojtaba Bijan
21	FW	IRN	Masoud Kazemeini^{U25}
23	FW	IRN	Erfan Pourafzar
24	MF	IRN	Mansur Bagheri^{U25}
25	MF	IRN	Mohammad Papi
27	DF	IRN	Mohammad Ali Faramarzi
28	FW	IRN	Mohsen Karimi
35	MF	IRN	Parham Javadi^{U21}
38	FW	IRN	Meraj Pourtaghi ^{U23}
48	FW	IRN	Mehdi Sharifi
66	MF	IRN	Sadegh Baba Ahmadi
77	DF	IRN	Mostafa Tajik
78	FW	IRN	Hossein Shajie
99	MF	IRN	Amir Hossein Karimi

== Officials ==
=== Managers ===
Name	Nat	From	To
Akbar Misaghian	(Iran)	July 2013	May 2014
Alireza Marzban	(Iran) (Germany)	May 2014	July 2015
Mohammad Reza Mohajeri	(Iran)	July 2015	June 2018
Yahya Golmohammadi	(Iran)	June 2018	January 2020
Mojtaba Sarasiaei	(Iran)	January 2020	July 2020
Sohrab Bakhtiarizadeh	(Iran)	July 2020	August 2020
Mehdi Rahmati	(Iran)	August 2020	2021

=== Coaching staff ===
Position	Name
Head coach	(Iran) Mehdi Rahmati
First Team Coach	(Iran) Vahid Fazeli
Assistant coach	(Iran) Mohammad Navazi
Assistant coach	(Iran) Ali Samereh
Goalkeeping coach	(Iran) Ashkan Namdari
Fitness coach	(Iran) Reza Ariyanik
Doctor	(Iran) Ali Azam
Analyzer	
Team manager	(Iran) Farhad Hamidavi

== Players on international cups ==
Players who were a member of their national team at International Competitions while playing for Shahr Khodro FC.

Cup	Players
(Australia) 2015 AFC Asian Cup	(Uzbekistan) Bahodir Nasimov
(Russia) 2018 FIFA World Cup	(Iran) Mohammadreza Khanzadeh

== Honours ==
- Azadegan League:
  - Winners (1): 2013–14

== Continental record ==
Season	Competition	Round	Club	Home	Away	Aggregate
2020	AFC Champions League	Preliminary round 2	(Bahrain) Al-Riffa	2–1		
2020	AFC Champions League	Play-off round	(Qatar) Al-Sailiya	0–0 (a.e.t.) (5–4 p)		
2020	AFC Champions League	Group B	(Uzbekistan) Pakhtakor	0–1	3–0	3rd
2020	AFC Champions League	Group B	(United Arab Emirates) Shabab Al-Ahli	0–1	1–0	3rd
