= 2020 AFC Champions League qualifying play-offs =

The 2020 AFC Champions League qualifying play-offs were played from 14 to 28 January 2020. A total of 28 teams competed in the qualifying play-offs to decide the remaining eight of the 32 places in the group stage of the 2020 AFC Champions League.

== Teams ==
The following 28 teams, split into two regions (West Region and East Region), entered the qualifying play-offs, consisting of three rounds:

- 8 teams entered in the preliminary round 1.
- 12 teams entered in the preliminary round 2.
- 8 teams entered in the play-off round.

Region	Teams entering in play-off round	Teams entering in preliminary round 2	Teams entering in preliminary round 1
West Region	(United Arab Emirates) Al-Ain; (Saudi Arabia) Al-Ahli; (Qatar) Al-Sailiya; (Qatar) Al-Rayyan	(Iran) Esteghlal; (Iran) Shahr Khodro; (Uzbekistan) Lokomotiv Tashkent; (Uzbekistan) Bunyodkor; (Iraq) Al-Zawraa; (Tajikistan) Istiklol	(India) Chennai City; (Jordan) Al-Faisaly; Al-Kuwait; (Bahrain) Al-Riffa
East Region	(South Korea) FC Seoul; (China) Shanghai SIPG; (Japan) FC Tokyo; (Japan) Kashima Antlers (Note: The identity of the second play-off team from Japan was not known at the time of the group stage draw.)	(Australia) Melbourne Victory; (Thailand) Port; (Thailand) Buriram United; (Malaysia) Kedah; (Hong Kong) Tai Po; (Vietnam) Ho Chi Minh City	(Philippines) Ceres–Negros; (Singapore) Tampines Rovers; (Indonesia) Bali United; (Myanmar) Shan United

== Format ==
In the qualifying play-offs, each tie was played as a single match. Extra time and a penalty shoot-out were used to decide the winner if necessary (Regulations Article 9.2).

== Schedule ==
The schedule of each round was as follows.

Round	Match date
Preliminary round 1	14 January 2020
Preliminary round 2	21 January 2020
Play-off round	28 January 2020

== Bracket ==
The bracket of the qualifying play-offs for each region was determined based on the association ranking of each team, with the team from the higher-ranked association hosting the match. Teams from the same association could not be placed into the same tie. The eight winners of the play-off round (four each from both West Region and East Region) advanced to the group stage to join the 24 direct entrants. All losers in each round from associations with only play-off slots entered the AFC Cup group stage.

=== Play-off West 1 ===
- (United Arab Emirates) Al-Ain advanced to Group D.

Preliminary round 1	Preliminary round 2		Play-off round
			(United Arab Emirates) Al-Ain	1
			(Uzbekistan) Bunyodkor	0
	(Uzbekistan) Bunyodkor	4
	(Iraq) Al-Zawraa	1

=== Play-off West 2 ===
- (Saudi Arabia) Al-Ahli advanced to Group A.

Preliminary round 1	Preliminary round 2		Play-off round
			(Saudi Arabia) Al-Ahli	1
			(Tajikistan) Istiklol	0
	(Uzbekistan) Lokomotiv Tashkent	0
	(Tajikistan) Istiklol	1

=== Play-off West 3 ===
- (Iran) Shahr Khodro advanced to Group B.

Preliminary round 1		Preliminary round 2		Play-off round
				(Qatar) Al-Sailiya	0 (4)
				(Iran) Shahr Khodro (p)	0 (5)
		(Iran) Shahr Khodro	2
(India) Chennai City	0	(Bahrain) Al-Riffa	1
(Bahrain) Al-Riffa	1

=== Play-off West 4 ===
- (Iran) Esteghlal advanced to Group A.

Preliminary round 1		Preliminary round 2		Play-off round
				(Qatar) Al-Rayyan	0
				(Iran) Esteghlal	5
		(Iran) Esteghlal	3
(Jordan) Al-Faisaly	1	Al-Kuwait	0
Al-Kuwait (a.e.t.)	2

=== Play-off East 1 ===
- (South Korea) FC Seoul advanced to Group E.

Preliminary round 1	Preliminary round 2		Play-off round
			(South Korea) FC Seoul	4
			(Malaysia) Kedah	1
	(Malaysia) Kedah	5
	(Hong Kong) Tai Po	1

=== Play-off East 2 ===
- (China) Shanghai SIPG advanced to Group H.

Preliminary round 1	Preliminary round 2		Play-off round
			(China) Shanghai SIPG	3
			(Thailand) Buriram United	0
	(Thailand) Buriram United	2
	(Vietnam) Ho Chi Minh City	1

=== Play-off East 3 ===
- (Japan) FC Tokyo advanced to Group F.

Preliminary round 1		Preliminary round 2		Play-off round
				(Japan) FC Tokyo	2
				(Philippines) Ceres–Negros	0
		(Thailand) Port	0
(Philippines) Ceres–Negros	3	(Philippines) Ceres–Negros	1
(Myanmar) Shan United	2

=== Play-off East 4 ===
- (Australia) Melbourne Victory advanced to Group E.

Preliminary round 1		Preliminary round 2		Play-off round
				(Japan) Kashima Antlers	0
				(Australia) Melbourne Victory	1
		(Australia) Melbourne Victory	5
(Singapore) Tampines Rovers	3	(Indonesia) Bali United	0
(Indonesia) Bali United (a.e.t.)	5

== Preliminary round 1 ==
=== Summary ===
A total of eight teams played in the preliminary round 1.

West Region
Team 1	Score	Team 2
Chennai City (India)	0–1	(Bahrain) Al-Riffa
Al-Faisaly (Jordan)	1–2 (a.e.t.)	Al-Kuwait

East Region
Team 1	Score	Team 2
Ceres–Negros (Philippines)	3–2	(Myanmar) Shan United
Tampines Rovers (Singapore)	3–5 (a.e.t.)	(Indonesia) Bali United

=== West Region ===
14 January 2020
18:00 UTC+5:30

Chennai City (India)	0–1	(Bahrain) Al-Riffa
	Live Report; Stats Report	Abduljabbar 41'

The Arena, Ahmedabad (Note: Chennai City played their home match at The Arena, Ahmedabad, instead of their regular home stadium Nehru Stadium, Chennai.)
Attendance: 1,227
Referee: Sherzod Kasimov (Uzbekistan)

14 January 2020
18:00 UTC+2

Al-Faisaly (Jordan)	1–2 (a.e.t.)	Al-Kuwait
Al-Jbarat 10'	Live Report; Stats Report	Nasser 34'; Al Hajeri 119'

Amman International Stadium, Amman
Attendance: 54
Referee: Yusuke Araki (Japan)

=== East Region ===
14 January 2020
19:30 UTC+8

Ceres–Negros (Philippines)	3–2	(Myanmar) Shan United
Lopez 5'; Marañón 40'; Porteria 79'	Live Report; Stats Report	Zin Min Tun 73'; Djawa 87'

Rizal Memorial Stadium, Manila
Attendance: 3,704
Referee: Ali Al-Samahiji (Bahrain)

14 January 2020
19:30 UTC+8

Tampines Rovers (Singapore)	3–5 (a.e.t.)	(Indonesia) Bali United
Kopitović 43'; Webb 53'; Rahmat 67' (o.g.)	Live Report; Stats Report	Platje 8', 13'; Rahmat 82'; Lilipaly 100'; Sidik 115'

Jalan Besar Stadium, Singapore
Attendance: 1,400
Referee: Ahmad Yacoub Ibrahim (Jordan)

== Preliminary round 2 ==
=== Summary ===
A total of 16 teams played in the preliminary round 2: twelve teams which entered in this round, and the four winners of the preliminary round 1.

West Region
Team 1	Score	Team 2
Bunyodkor (Uzbekistan)	4–1	(Iraq) Al-Zawraa
Lokomotiv Tashkent (Uzbekistan)	0–1	(Tajikistan) Istiklol
Shahr Khodro (Iran)	2–1	(Bahrain) Al-Riffa
Esteghlal (Iran)	3–0	Al-Kuwait

East Region
Team 1	Score	Team 2
Kedah (Malaysia)	5–1	(Hong Kong) Tai Po
Buriram United (Thailand)	2–1	(Vietnam) Ho Chi Minh City
Port (Thailand)	0–1	(Philippines) Ceres–Negros
Melbourne Victory (Australia)	5–0	(Indonesia) Bali United

=== West Region ===
22 January 2020 (Note: The match between Bunyodkor and Al-Zawraa, originally to be played on 21 January 2020, was re-scheduled to 22 January 2020, to avoid a clash with the match between Lokomotiv Tashkent and Istiklol, also to be played in Tashkent, on the same day.)
14:00 UTC+5

Bunyodkor (Uzbekistan)	4–1	(Iraq) Al-Zawraa
Kholmukhamedov 8' (pen.); Murtazoev 46', 85'; Farkhodov 80'	Live Report; Stats Report	Qasim 89'

JAR Stadium, Tashkent
Attendance: 594
Referee: Yudai Yamamoto (Japan)

21 January 2020
15:00 UTC+5

Lokomotiv Tashkent (Uzbekistan)	0–1	(Tajikistan) Istiklol
	Live Report; Stats Report	A. Dzhalilov 60'

Lokomotiv Stadium, Tashkent
Attendance: 4,256
Referee: Hussein Abo Yehia (Lebanon)

25 January 2020 (Note: The Football Federation Islamic Republic of Iran received a letter from the Asian Football Confederation on 17 January 2020 announcing that teams from Iran would not be allowed to host their home matches in their country due to security issues after Downing of Ukraine International Airlines Flight 752. The four AFC Champions League teams from Iran announced on 18 January 2020 that they would withdraw from the tournament if the ban was not reversed. As a result, the two preliminary round 2 matches which the Iranian teams were supposed to host, Shahr Khodro against Al-Riffa and Esteghlal against Al-Kuwait, were not played as scheduled on 21 January 2020 (at 16:20 UTC+3:30 at Imam Reza Stadium, Mashhad and at 18:00 UTC+3:30 at Azadi Stadium, Tehran respectively), and the AFC announced on 22 January 2020 that the matches were re-scheduled to 25 January 2020 in the United Arab Emirates.)
18:20 UTC+4

Shahr Khodro (Iran)	2–1	(Bahrain) Al-Riffa
Khalatbari 19'; Ghaseminejad 83'	Live Report; Stats Report	Saeid 35'

Sharjah Stadium, Sharjah (United Arab Emirates)
Attendance: 50
Referee: Kim Dae-yong (South Korea)

25 January 2020
18:20 UTC+4

Esteghlal (Iran)	3–0	Al-Kuwait
Diabaté 27', 54'; Ghafouri 59'	Live Report; Stats Report

Maktoum bin Rashid Al Maktoum Stadium, Dubai (United Arab Emirates)
Attendance: 3,420
Referee: Nazmi Nasaruddin (Malaysia)

=== East Region ===
21 January 2020
21:00 UTC+8

Kedah (Malaysia)	5–1	(Hong Kong) Tai Po
Tchétché 3', 21', 90+2'; Hadin 47', 66'	Live Report; Stats Report	Chan Man Fai 68'

Darul Aman Stadium, Alor Setar
Attendance: 19,803
Referee: Saoud Al-Adba (Qatar)

21 January 2020
18:30 UTC+7

Buriram United (Thailand)	2–1	(Vietnam) Ho Chi Minh City
Cuesta 53'; Bueno 74'	Live Report; Stats Report	Diakité 77'

Chang Arena, Buriram
Attendance: 14,190
Referee: Nivon Robesh Gamini (Sri Lanka)

21 January 2020
19:00 UTC+7

Port (Thailand)	0–1	(Philippines) Ceres–Negros
	Live Report; Stats Report	Schröck 51'

PAT Stadium, Bangkok
Attendance: 6,234
Referee: Yu Ming-hsun (Chinese Taipei)

21 January 2020
19:35 UTC+11

Melbourne Victory (Australia)	5–0	(Indonesia) Bali United
Basha 14'; Hope 37'; Kruse 59'; Toivonen 81'; Kamsoba 90'	Live Report; Stats Report

AAMI Park, Melbourne
Attendance: 5,387
Referee: Mohammed Al-Hoish (Saudi Arabia)

== Play-off round ==
=== Summary ===
A total of 16 teams played in the play-off round: eight teams which entered in this round, and the eight winners of the preliminary round 2.

West Region
Team 1	Score	Team 2
Al-Ain (United Arab Emirates)	1–0	(Uzbekistan) Bunyodkor
Al-Ahli (Saudi Arabia)	1–0	(Tajikistan) Istiklol
Al-Sailiya (Qatar)	0–0 (a.e.t.) (4–5 p)	(Iran) Shahr Khodro
Al-Rayyan (Qatar)	0–5	(Iran) Esteghlal

East Region
Team 1	Score	Team 2
FC Seoul (South Korea)	4–1	(Malaysia) Kedah
Shanghai SIPG (China)	3–0	(Thailand) Buriram United
FC Tokyo (Japan)	2–0	(Philippines) Ceres–Negros
Kashima Antlers (Japan)	0–1	(Australia) Melbourne Victory

=== West Region ===
28 January 2020
18:40 UTC+4

Al-Ain (United Arab Emirates)	1–0	(Uzbekistan) Bunyodkor
Saeed 78'	Live Report; Stats Report

Hazza bin Zayed Stadium, Al Ain
Attendance: 4,424
Referee: Ko Hyung-jin (South Korea)

28 January 2020
20:30 UTC+3

Al-Ahli (Saudi Arabia)	1–0	(Tajikistan) Istiklol
Belaïli 90+1' (pen.)	Live Report; Stats Report

King Abdullah Sports City, Jeddah
Attendance: 10,942
Referee: Sivakorn Pu-udom (Thailand)

28 January 2020
18:10 UTC+3

Al-Sailiya (Qatar)	0–0 (a.e.t.)	(Iran) Shahr Khodro
	Live Report; Stats Report
Penalties
Boussoufa (penalty scored); Ansarifard (penalty missed); Mbodji (penalty scored); Siddiq (penalty scored); Belhadj (penalty scored)	4–5	(penalty scored) Seifollahi; (penalty scored) Sarlak; (penalty scored) Ghaseminejad; (penalty scored) Faraji; (penalty scored) Sadeghi

Abdullah bin Khalifa Stadium, Doha
Attendance: 465
Referee: Liu Kwok Man (Hong Kong)

28 January 2020
18:15 UTC+3

Al-Rayyan (Qatar)	0–5	(Iran) Esteghlal
	Live Report; Stats Report	Diabaté 8'; Ghaedi 40', 47'; Motahari 84', 90+1'

Jassim bin Hamad Stadium, Al Rayyan
Attendance: 1,811
Referee: Minoru Tōjō (Japan)

=== East Region ===
28 January 2020
19:00 UTC+9

FC Seoul (South Korea)	4–1	(Malaysia) Kedah
Park Chu-young 38' (pen.); Park Dong-jin 49'; Osmar 63'; Alibaev 90+2'	Live Report; Stats Report	Osmar 52' (o.g.)

Seoul World Cup Stadium, Seoul
Attendance: 5,373
Referee: Omar Al-Yaqoubi (Oman)

28 January 2020
15:00 UTC+8

Shanghai SIPG (China)	3–0	(Thailand) Buriram United
Li Shenglong 75'; Arnautović 90+2'; Hulk 90+5' (pen.)	Live Report; Stats Report

Yuanshen Sports Centre Stadium, Shanghai
Attendance: 1 (Note: The match between Shanghai SIPG and Buriram United was played without spectators due to the COVID-19 pandemic in China.)
Referee: Aziz Asimov (Uzbekistan)

28 January 2020
19:00 UTC+9

FC Tokyo (Japan)	2–0	(Philippines) Ceres–Negros
Muroya 48'; Adaílton 89'	Live Report; Stats Report

Ajinomoto Stadium, Tokyo
Attendance: 6,630
Referee: Masoud Tufayelieh (Syria)

28 January 2020
19:00 UTC+9

Kashima Antlers (Japan)	0–1	(Australia) Melbourne Victory
	Live Report; Stats Report	Nabbout 54'

Kashima Soccer Stadium, Kashima
Attendance: 4,275
Referee: Mooud Bonyadifar (Iran)
