= Júnior Negrão =

Brazilian footballer (born 1986)

Junior Negrão
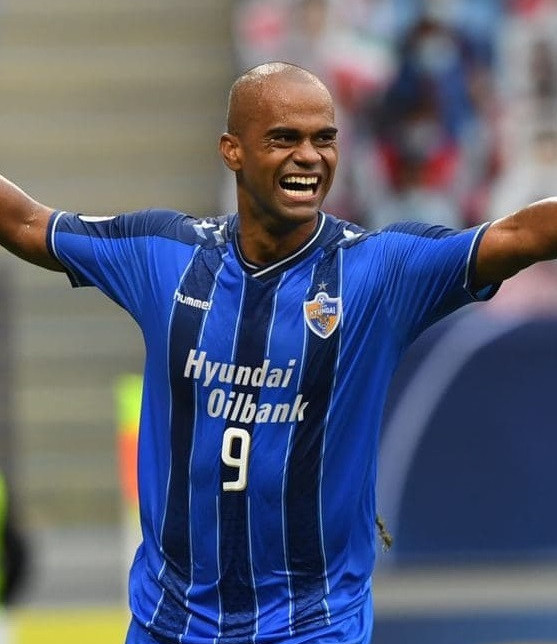
- Júnior Negrão in 2020

Personal information
- Full name: Gleidionor Figueiredo Pinto Júnior
- Date of birth: 30 December 1986 (age 39)
- Place of birth: Salvador, Bahia, Brazil
- Height: 1.87 m (6 ft 2 in)
- Position: Forward

Youth career
- 2001–2003: Fast Club
- 2003–2005: Nacional-AM

Senior career*
Years	Team	Apps	(Gls)
2005–2006	Nacional-AM	0	(0)
2007	Corinthians	1	(0)
2008–2015	Tombense	0	(0)
2008	→ Madureira (loan)	0	(0)
2008	→ Belenenses (loan)	0	(0)
2009	→ CRAC (loan)	0	(0)
2009	→ ABC (loan)	21	(10)
2010	→ Figueirense (loan)	1	(0)
2010–2011	→ Germinal Beerschot (loan)	18	(7)
2011–2012	→ Lausanne-Sport (loan)	20	(4)
2012	→ Guarani (loan)	9	(1)
2013	→ América-RN (loan)	15	(3)
2014	→ América-MG (loan)	17	(2)
2015	→ Oeste (loan)	24	(4)
2016	Muangthong United	0	(0)
2016	→ Pattaya United (loan)	29	(20)
2017	Daegu FC	16	(12)
2018–2020	Ulsan Hyundai	94	(67)
2021–2022	Changchun Yatai	37	(23)
2023	Sichuan Jiuniu	5	(1)
Total		307	(154)
- * Club domestic league appearances and goals as of 29 June 2023

Gleidionor Figueiredo Pinto Júnior (born 30 December 1986), or simply Júnior Negrão (often written as Negão), is a Brazilian former professional footballer who plays as a forward.

Having extensively traveled around Brazil and Europe during the first part of his career due to frequent loan spells, Júnior has turned out to be a late bloomer since the start of his adventure in Asian football, thanks to a streak of successful seasons in Thailand, South Korea and China.

He gained the nickname "The Smiling Assassin", due to the funny contrast between his quiet, kind and positive attitude off the pitch and his impressive goals to game ratio, united with a hard-working and aggressive style of play, on the pitch.

== Early life ==
Born in Salvador, Bahia, his parents moved to Manaus, Amazonas before he turned his first year of age. For this reason, Júnior has stated that he considers himself a manauara, as he spent there the entirety of his childhood and adolescence.

== Career ==
=== Early career ===
After playing in the youth squads of local teams Fast Club and Nacional for four years, Júnior came through the youth system of the latter squad and was first aggregated to the first team in 2005. Although he didn't register a single appearance in the national league, he rapidly became a revelation for the club in the state league Campeonato Amazonense: throughout his first couple of seasons as a professional player, Júnior scored 14 goals in 14 matches, including one against Cruzeiro in a national cup match.

His impressive performances for Nacional made him earn a partnership with agent Eduardo Uram (co-owner of Brazilian investment fund Europe Sports Group) and attracted several high-profile teams across the nation: in the end, it was Corinthians that signed the promising center-forward in 2007. However, Júnior's experience with the São Paulo-based club turned out to be a bit of a disappointment: he registered his only appearance for the senior team (as well as his only appearance in a national top-tier match to date) on 22 July 2007, replacing Finazzi at the start of the second half of a 0–3 home loss against Náutico. As a result, he got involved in Corinthians' shocking season, which culminated in a final 17th place and the first relegation to the national second-tier in the club's history. Despite all of this, Júnior remembers his year at Corinthians as "a wonderful experience" that helped him study "a totally different scenario" and mature as a person.

=== Tombense and loans ===
In 2008 Júnior moved to the adjacent state of Minas Gerais to join Tombense, hoping he would get way more chances to play. However, since it had first become a fully professional club in 1998, Tombense had been facing a heavy crisis for years: they had never managed to take part in the national league, yet (due to their low rate at a federal level) and, at the time of Júnior's arrival, they were sustaining their sixth season of inactivity in just ten years. The unstable condition of the club, together with a lack of support from the ESG management, reportedly due to the Brazilian's "economically unfruitful" playing position, hugely affected Júnior's career, as the center-forward began what ended up to be a considerably long cycle of loan spells across Brazil and Europe.

During his first couple of years at Tombense, Júnior went on loan four times (twice a year), with mixed results, at Madureira (in Série C), Belenenses (in the Portuguese Primeira Liga) and CRAC (in Série D). On the other hand, the brief spell at ABC in the second half of 2009 was more satisfying for him: the club finished last in Série B and got relegated, but Júnior found enough time to get 21 appearances and score ten goals. In the process, he also scored the first hat-trick of his career in a 6–2 home win against Brasiliense.

Meanwhile, Tombense was re-abilitated to compete in the federal system of Campeonato Mineiro, but this didn't prevent Júnior from being loaned away again. At the start of 2010, while playing for Figueirense, he featured just once in Série B, but also scored five goals in just four matches of the state league Campeonato Catarinense.

==== Germinal Beerschot ====
After a few weeks spent training with Germinal Beerschot as a trialist, Júnior got his first proper chance to shine in European football, signing a one-year loan deal with the Belgian side on 28 August 2010. In his first pre-season game, he scored two goals, one from a free kick and the other one being a penalty, thus helping his side to a 5–3 win against Gent.

His official debut in the Jupiler Pro League came on 11 September 2010, when he replaced Bavon Tshibuabua at the 63rd minute of a 1–0 home win against Charleroi. Ten days after, he featured for the first time in the starting XI and scored a hat-trick, which were also his first three goals in the Belgian top-tier league, although he could not help his side avoid a 4–3 away loss against Zulte Waregem.

In the end, Germinal Beerschot finished in 13th place, subsequently missing the qualification to the Europa League, and reached the quarter-finals of the national cup, before being eliminated by Cercle Brugge. Júnior closed his spell in Belgium with a total number of 22 appearances (most of which as a starter) and eight goals.

==== Lausanne Sport ====
The following season, Júnior remained in Europe, as he joined Swiss side Lausanne-Sport. The Brazilian center-forward made his debut in the Super League on 30 July 2011, replacing Matt Moussilou at the 87th minute of a 2–1 home win against FC Zürich.

In comparison to the previous season, Júnior had less game time, being primarily used as a back-up striker both for the aforementioned Moussilou and Jocelyn Roux: nevertheless, he kept on gaining experience and ended his spell in Switzerland with a total number of 23 appearances and nine goals.

==== Return to Brazil ====
At the end of the loan at Lausanne, in 2012 Júnior returned to Brazil, but soon he was loaned at Guarani, where he played his third Série B championship. Nonetheless, in the subsequent couple of years Tombense finally gained enough stability both on and off the pitch, and their good results in the Campeonato Mineiro gifted the club with its first participation to the national football league system ever: plus, their debut year in Série D unexpectedly turned into a success when they beat Brasil de Pelotas in the final (after a penalty shoot-out) and won a historic promotion to the national third-tier.

Júnior played a good contribute in both seasons (especially the former one), even if his game time was limited to the federal league and both the seasons were split between Tombense and another loans, respectively, at América-RN and América-MG, twice again in Série B.

In 2015, the striker played what still constitutes his last season in Brazil, joining Oeste on another loan deal. In total, Júnior scored four goals and made five assists to help the Barueri-based side remain in the national second-tier, aside of featuring regularly in the Série A2 of the Campeonato Paulista.

The expiration of Júnior's spell at Oeste put an end to a whopping number of eleven consecutive loan spells, distributed over seven years and four different countries: Brazil, Portugal, Belgium and Switzerland.

=== Muangthong United and Pattaya United ===
The following year, the Brazilian agreed the contract terms to sign for Thai side Muangthong United on a permanent basis, thus leaving Tombense after seven years and starting a whole new experience in another continent. At the time, the club listed local stars such as Chanathip Songkrasin and Kawin Thamsatchanan in its roster. Júnior joined the club on their tour of several ASEAN countries, and made his debut in a friendly match against Vietnamese side Becamex FC: in the same occasion, he headed his first goal in (whereas another one was invalidated due to offside), but Muangthong eventually suffered a 2–1 loss.

He actually started his first official match for the club on 2 February 2016, as Muangthong beat Malaysian side Johor Darul Ta'zim at the penalty shoot-out and progressed to the following qualification round to the AFC Champions League group stage. Júnior played for 105 minutes, before being substituted by Teerasil Dangda in the second extra-time. Unfortunately, he was considered to have failed to make a good impression in that occasion, as well as his two following features for Muangthong: a 3–0 loss against Shanghai SIPG in the third round of qualification of the ACL and a 3–1 loss against Buriram United in the Kor Royal Cup.

The club soon decided to arrange a loan spell for Júnior, who joined fellow Thai side Pattaya United and left Muangthong, having collected only three appearances. As the loan was performed before the start of the national league, the Brazilian ended up debuting in the competition with Pattaya instead of Muangthong, playing in a 2–1 away loss against Chonburi FC for all the 90 minutes. He scored his first goal in Thailand on 16 March 2016, in a 3–3 home draw against Chiangrai United. He had to wait for two matches before finding the net again, but following his goal against Army United he went on scoring for five consecutive matches, bagging a brace in three occasions: thanks to Júnior's contributions, Pattaya won every single one of those fixtures.

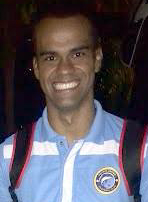
Júnior Negrão with Pattaya United in 2016

Being featured on the pitch from the front to the back of the match in the most part of the occasions, Júnior kept on scoring regularly, including a hat-trick (the fourth of his career) in Pattaya's last fixture of the season, a 4–1 home victory against Nakhon Ratchasima.

This way, what initially seemed to be a difficult season for the center-forward saw him score a total number of 20 goals in the Thai League: he consequently joined Dragan Bošković and Heberty as the second top scorer ex aequo of the competition (with the first one being Cleiton Silva, Júnior's fellow Brazilian and team-mate at Muangthong just some months before), and he gave Pattaya (now defunct and renamed to Samut Prakan City) a great helping hand to stay afloat in the local top-tier.

=== Daegu FC ===
After his exploit in Thailand, Júnior gained popularity throughout the continent: in 2017, he decided to join South Korean team Daegu FC, which had just got promoted to K League 1 again and proceeded to include the striker in its roster alongside fellow Brazilians Evandro and Cesinha.

Unfortunately, the adventure with the "Sky Blues" had a difficult start for the center-forward: picked for the starting XI in the first game of the season against Gwangju, Júnior suffered an injury at the 52nd minute of the match and got ruled out for four months. Once he got on the pitch again in August, he was initially used a substitute in order to facilitate his full recover: however, at the third occasion since his return, Júnior scored the winner in another match against Gwangju, rebounding the ball in the back of the net after Yoon Bo-sang saved his penalty kick.

Another goal from the bench in a draw against Sangju Sangmu and a winning brace against Pohang Steelers (with the latter being the first game he played from the start since his injury in March) gave Júnior a regular spot in the team back. During the regular season, he went on to score six times more (another brace against Ulsan Hyundai, one goal against Jeonbuk Hyundai Motors and a hat-trick in the last game, against Jeonnam Dragons), then found the net other two times during the relegation round, once more against Pohang (when he also assisted Evandro's opening goal) and Gwangju.

Having scored 12 goals in only 16 matches since his return, Júnior became Daegu's top scorer and helped the "Sky Blues" in their successful fight to stay in the national top-tier, together with team-mates such as Jo Hyeon-woo, Kim Sun-min and Cesinha.

=== Ulsan Hyundai ===
Following his satisfying spell at Daegu, in 2018 Júnior joined former rivals Ulsan Hyundai on a free transfer. He made his debut with the Kim do-hoon-guided side on 13 February 2018, coming in for Yohei Toyoda at the 76th minute of a 3–3 away draw against Melbourne Victory in the first game of AFC Champions League's group stage. His first match in the K League 1 was actually on 1 March, when he replaced fellow first timer Oh Se-hun at the 56th minute of a 2–0 away loss against Jeonbuk Hyundai Motors.

Originally supposed to be a back-up striker for teammates Kim Seung-jun and Toyoda, after the injury crisis of the former and the departure of the latter he began to find more and more space in the squad, scoring his first goal for Ulsan against Pohang Steelers and continuing his streak for three more matches, against Gangwon, his former team Daegu and FC Seoul: plus, he scored a brace in the AFC Champions League as the "Horangi" thrashed Melbourne Victory 6–2. However, during the following game (against Gyeongnam) he suffered a new injury and got ruled out for a month.

As the K League stopped throughout the whole month of June, due to the participation of the South Korea national team to the World Cup, Júnior had more time to recover and returned on the pitch as soon as the competition restarted in July: he immediately scored other two goals against Sangju, then had to wait four more games before finding the net again, in two consecutive matches against Daegu and Jeju United. After another couple of goalless appearances, on 15 August the Brazilian striker started a goal streak that would last for exactly a month, as he scored against Gyeongnam (a brace, plus an assist for Kim Seung-jun), Daegu, Sangju (two times), Seoul (also two times), Incheon United and Pohang: in four out of these six occasions, Ulsan won the match.

Júnior's impressive state of form continued for the rest of the year, as he added other five goals between regular season and championship round in K League, as well as three goals (two against Gimhae FC and one against Suwon Samsung Bluewings) in the Korean FA Cup, which Ulsan eventually lost in a double final to Daegu. The "Horangi" eventually finished the K League 1 in third place and Júnior gained the same placement in the top scorer chart, with 22 goals (Uroš Đerić and fellow Brazilian Marcão being the only players to top him), as well as a spot in the championship's Best XI, together with his team-mate Richard Windbichler.

The following season began quite in the same fashion for the Brazilian, immediately scoring a goal in Ulsan's 5–1 home win against Malaysian side Perak TBG to advance to the AFC Champions League's group stage. Then, in his side's first K League 1 game of the year against Suwon, he found the net again and provided an assist for Kim In-sung in Ulsan's 2–1 win.

A regular starter throughout the whole year (Joo Min-kyu being the main back-up striker for him), Júnior continued performing well in South Korea, where he confessed repeated times to "feel at home". However, the "Horangi" experienced a 2019 full of disappointments: in April, they faced a surprising and premature elimination from the KFA Cup against K3 League side Daejeon Korail; after making it through the ACL's group stage (where Júnior scored two goals, one against Shanghai SIPG and one against Kawasaki Frontale), they were eliminated in the first phase of the knock-out stage by Suwon; most notably, they failed to win the league title at the last chance of the final round. In fact, although Júnior scored a goal, Ulsan eventually suffered a 1–4 home loss against Pohang, while their direct rivals in the form of Jeonbuk beat Gangwon 1–0, thanks to a goal by Son Jun-ho: although both the teams finished with 79 points, Jeonbuk was declared winner due to a better goal difference. Anyhow, thanks to his 19 goals Júnior ended up being the second top scorer of the league (the first one being Adam Taggart): moreover, he was included in the competition's Best XI again, this time alongside his team-mate Kim Tae-hwan.

The Brazilian and Ulsan prepared for the 2020 season hoping they would find redemption from their past losses: unfortunately, the "Horangi" managed to play just one game, a 1–1 home draw against FC Tokyo in the AFC Champions League's group stage (where Júnior played for all of the 90 minutes without scoring) before all of the national, continental and international competitions were suspended and/or postponed due to the COVID-19 pandemic.

Despite having faced a difficult situation during the first months of 2020, South Korea was the first nation in the world to restart national competitions: on 9 May 2020, just one day after the match between Jeonbuk and Suwon marked the official restart both of K League and world football, Ulsan made his seasonal debut with a 4–0 home win against Sangju Sangmu, with Júnior scoring two goals (one of which on a penalty kick) and assisting one for Lee Sang-heon. The Brazilian's performance kickstarted one of the most successful seasons of his lifetime. In the first ten games of K League 1, the Brazilian scored twelve goals, including braces against Sangju and Suwon and a hat-trick against Incheon. Then, he proceeded to go on a goal streak of four games, netting braces against his former club Daegu and Sangju again, as well as single goals against Gangwon and Busan IPark. As the most part of the national and continental competitions around the globe became operative again only between June and July, shortly after the first half of the year Júnior found himself to be the temporary top scorer in the world, gaining international cover from the press and being praised in his homeland country as "O artilheiro do mundo" (literally, "the world's top bomber" in Portuguese).

Unfortunately, the striker's unmatched form still wasn't sufficient to bring more fortune to Ulsan: at the start of November, the "Horangi" had missed out on both the K League title (again) and the KFA Cup in favour of Jeonbuk Hyundai Motors, having lost every match but one (the first leg of the double cup final, where Júnior scored a goal) against the "Green Warriors". At least, the Brazilian could add to his personal achievements his third inclusion in a row in K League 1's Best XI, two prizes as Player of the Month and, finally, the title of top scorer: with 26 goals in 27 games, he also set a new record for the best "goals to game" ratio (0.96) of any player in the national league's history.

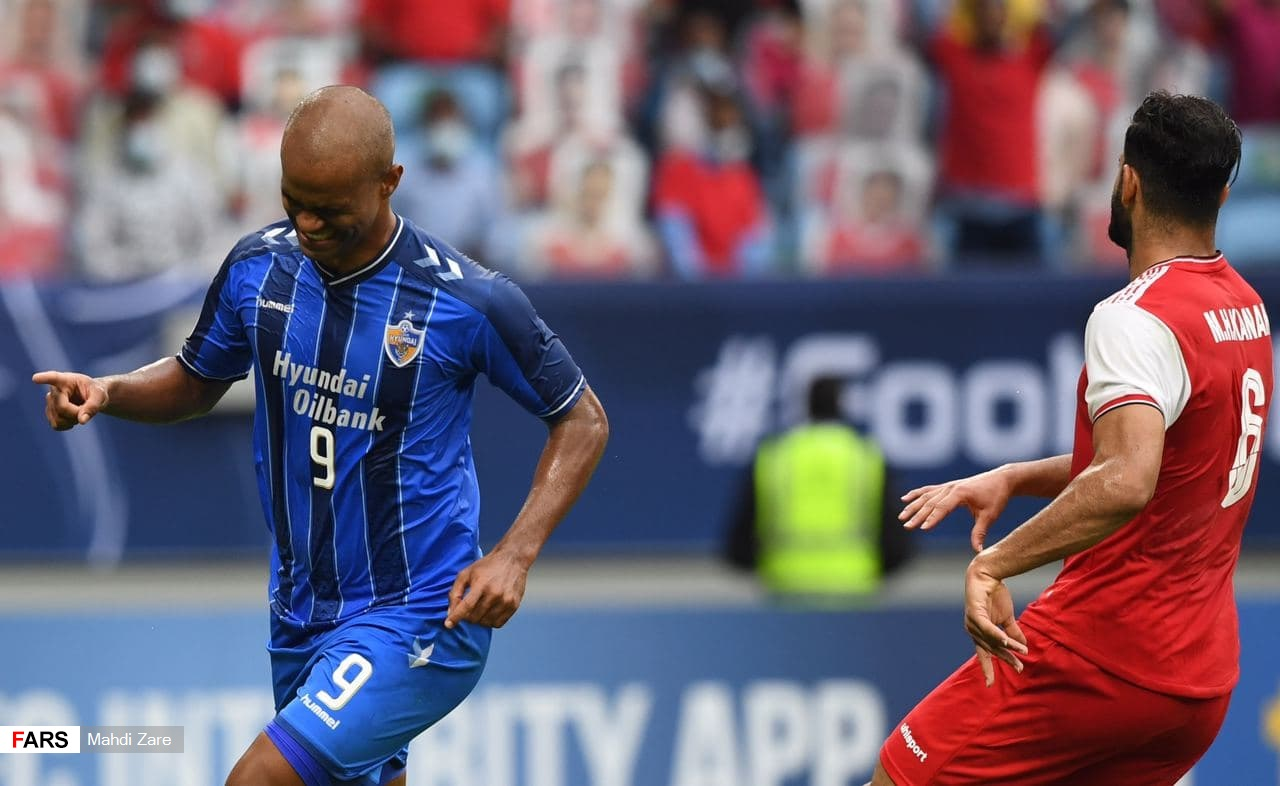
Júnior celebrating his first goal in the 2020 AFC Champions League Final

Then, Júnior flew with the "Horangi" to Qatar to reach the centralised venues that would host all the remaining games of the group stage and the knockout phase of the AFC Champions League. The team won all of the five remaining matches of their group against FC Tokyo, Shanghai Shenhua and Perth Glory, with Júnior scoring a goal in each one of the games against the Australian side (also adding an assist for Kim In-sung in the second one). Then, they beat Melbourne Victory, Beijing Sinobo Guoan and Vissel Kobe to make it through the knockout stage and reach the final, with the Brazilian striker scoring a brace against the Chinese side and sending the decisive penalty in the back of the net to close the extra time against the Japanese side.

Finally, on 19 December 2020, Ulsan faced Persepolis in the AFC Champions League Final: the Iranian side initially took the lead thanks to Mehdi Abdi, but then Júnior scored one penalty for half (the first one being rebounded in the back of the net, after Hamed Lak saved the Brazilian's first attempt), thus resulting one of the key members in the 2–1 win over Persepolis and consequent victory of the continental competition (which marked Ulsan's first success in Asia since 2012). As a result, to his performances, the center-forward was included in the Champions League's Best XI: plus, thanks to his seven goals he became the top scorer of the competition, together with Abderrazak Hamdallah, even though the official award went to the Moroccan striker, since he played fewer minutes throughout the whole competition.

Moreover, Júnior's marvellous 2020 rewarded him as the third Best Footballer in the continent of the year, according to Fox Sports Asia (only Sardar Azmoun and Son Heung-min topped him), as well as the fifth most prolific striker of the year, behind only the likes of Erling Haaland, Romelu Lukaku, Cristiano Ronaldo and Robert Lewandowski.

After four years full of achievements, the Brazilian's journey in South Korea came to an end on 28 January 2021: on that day, Ulsan published Júnior's official farewell speech on their YouTube channel, as he announced that the club and him agreed to let his contract expire, observing that he "wanted and needed to change", even though he stressed that "he would always support the team". Press sources indicated new manager Hong Myung-Bo's plan to assemble a younger squad as one of the possible reasons for the Brazilian's departure.

Anyway, with his departure from the Asian country Júnior closed the most successful period of his career to date: in 110 games with Daegu FC and Ulsan Hyundai, he scored a total number of 79 goals (12 in 16 games for the former team, 67 in 94 games for the latter) and provided nine assists; he was included in the league's Best XI thrice in a row; he won three titles as Player of the Month, one as the league's Top Scorer and one AFC Champions League title.

=== Changchun Yatai ===
On 24 February 2021, previous speculations about Júnior's possible transfer to Chinese team Changchun Yatai were proven right, as the club officially announced the signing of the center-forward.

Júnior subsequently made his debut for Changchun on 22 April 2021, starting and scoring a goal in a 2–1 away win against Dalian Pro. In total, the Brazilian scored 11 goals in 12 appearances during the regular season of the Chinese Super League, as Changchun topped their group (together with Shanghai Port) and qualified for the championship stage.

In January 2023, Júnior left Changchun Yatai.

=== Sichuan Jiuniu ===
On 21 April 2023, Júnior joined China League One side Sichuan Jiuniu.

== Personal life ==
Júnior is a Christian, and he is frequently seen pointing fingers to the sky as a form of prayer after scoring a goal. Júnior is married and he has two daughters, named Anna Julia and Isabella.

He stated he would like to play for Bahia as his last team before retirement: being one of the most representative clubs of his birthplace (together with Vitória), he said that would give him the opportunity to honor the legacy of his parents, especially his father.

== Career statistics ==
As of 4 June 2023

Appearances and goals by club, season and competition
Club	Season	League			Cup		Continental		Other		Total	
Club	Season	Division	Apps	Goals	Apps	Goals	Apps	Goals	Apps	Goals	Apps	Goals
Nacional-AM	2005	Série C	0	0	—		—		4 (Note: Appearances in Campeonato Amazonense)	3	4	3
Nacional-AM	2006	—	—		1	1	—		9	10	10	11
Nacional-AM	Total		0	0	1	1	—		13	13	14	14
Corinthians	2007	Série A	1	0	0	0	0	0	0	0	1	0
Tombense	2013	—	—		—		—		13 (Note: Appearances in Campeonato Mineiro)	8	13	8
Tombense	2014	Série D	—		0	0	—		11	2	11	2
Tombense	Total		—		0	0	—		24	10	24	10
Madureira (loan)	2008	Série C	—		2	0	—		0	0	2	0
Belenenses (loan)	2008–09	Primeira Liga	0	0	0	0	—		—		0	0
CRAC (loan)	2009	Série D	—		—		—		0	0	0	0
ABC (loan)	2009	Série B	21	10	—		—		—		21	10
Figueirense (loan)	2010	Série B	1	0	0	0	—		4 (Note: Appearances in Campeonato Catarinense)	5	5	5
Germinal Beerschot (loan)	2010–11	Belgian Pro League	18	7	4	1	—		—		22	8
Lausanne-Sport (loan)	2011–12	Swiss Super League	20	4	2	2	—		—		22	6
Guarani (loan)	2012	Série B	9	1	—		—		—		9	1
América-RN (loan)	2013	Série B	15	3	—		—		—		15	3
América-MG (loan)	2014	Série B	17	2	1	1	—		—		18	3
Oeste (loan)	2015	Série B	24	4	0	0	—		17 (Note: Appearances in Campeonato Paulista Série A2)	3	41	7
Muangthong United	2016	Thai League 1	—		—		2	0	1 (Note: Appearances in Kor Royal Cup)	0	3	0
Pattaya United (loan)	2016	Thai League 1	29	20	?	?	—		—		29	20
Daegu FC	2017	K League 1	16	12	0	0	—		—		16	12
Ulsan Hyundai	2018	K League 1	32	22	4	3	3	2	—		39	27
Ulsan Hyundai	2019	K League 1	35	19	1	0	8	3	—		44	22
Ulsan Hyundai	2020	K League 1	27	26	5	2	9	7	—		41	35
Ulsan Hyundai	Total		94	67	10	5	20	12	—		124	84
Changchun Yatai	2021	Chinese Super League	17	14	2	0	—		—		19	14
Changchun Yatai	2022	Chinese Super League	20	9	0	0	—		—		20	9
Changchun Yatai	Total		37	23	2	0	0	0	0	0	39	23
Sichuan Jiuniu	2023	China League One	5	1	0	0	—		—		5	1
Career total			307	154	22	10	22	12	59	31	410	207

== Honours ==
Ulsan Hyundai

- AFC Champions League: 2020
- Korean FA Cup runner-up: 2018, 2020

Individual

- K League 1 Best XI: 2018, 2019, 2020
- K League 1 top scorer: 2020
- AFC Champions League top scorer: 2020
- AFC Champions League Fans XI: 2020
- AFC Champions League All Star XI: 2020
- Chinese Super League Top Scorer: 2021
- K League Player of the Month: September 2019, May 2020, July 2020
