= 2020 AFC Champions League group stage =

Football tournament group stage

The 2020 AFC Champions League group stage was played from 10 February to 4 December 2020. A total of 32 teams competed in the group stage to decide the 16 places in the knockout stage of the 2020 AFC Champions League.

The competition was suspended due to the COVID-19 pandemic in Asia after matchday 3 on 4 March 2020. On 9 July 2020, the AFC announced that it would restart on 14 September 2020. All matches after restart were played in Qatar.

== Draw ==
The draw for the group stage was held on 10 December 2019, 16:30 MYT (UTC+8), at the AFC House in Kuala Lumpur, Malaysia. The 32 teams were drawn into eight groups of four: four groups each in the West Region (Groups A–D) and the East Region (Groups E–H). Teams from the same association could not be drawn into the same group.

The mechanism of the draw was as follows:

- For the West Region, there was no associations draw due to country protection. A draw was held for each of the four associations with more than one direct entrant (United Arab Emirates, Saudi Arabia, Qatar, Iran) to determine for each team their group positions:
  - The three direct entrants of the United Arab Emirates were drawn to positions A1, B2, or C3, while the play-off winners West 1 (which their play-off team may advance from) were allocated to position D4.
  - The three direct entrants of Saudi Arabia were drawn to positions B1, C2, or D3, while the play-off winners West 2 (which their play-off team may advance from) were allocated to position A4.
  - The two direct entrants of Qatar were drawn to positions C1 or D2, while the play-off winners West 3 and 4 (which their play-off teams may advance from) were drawn to positions A3 or B4.
  - The two direct entrants of Iran were drawn to positions D1 or C4.
  - The direct entrants of Uzbekistan and Iraq were allocated to positions B3 and A2 respectively.
- For the East Region, a draw was held for the two associations with three direct entrants (South Korea, China) to determine the order of associations. After the associations draw, a draw was held for each of the four associations with more than one direct entrant (South Korea, China, Japan, Australia) to determine for each team their group positions:
  - The three direct entrants of the first association drawn (South Korea or China) were drawn to positions E1, F2, or G3, while the play-off winners East 1 or 2 (which their play-off team may advance from) were allocated to position H4.
  - The three direct entrants of the second association drawn (South Korea or China) were drawn to positions F1, G2, or H3, while the play-off winners East 1 or 2 (which their play-off team may advance from) were allocated to position E4.
  - The two direct entrants of Japan were drawn to positions G1 or H2, while the play-off winners East 3 and 4 (which their play-off teams may advance from) were either allocated to F4 and E3 respectively (if South Korea were the first association drawn), or drawn to positions E3 or F4 (if China were the first association drawn).
  - The two direct entrants of Australia were either drawn to positions H1 or F3 (if South Korea were the first association drawn, or if China were the first association drawn and the play-off winners East 4 were drawn to position E3), or positions H1 or E2 (if China were the first association drawn and the play-off winners East 3 were drawn to position E3).
  - The direct entrants of Thailand and Malaysia were allocated to either positions G4 and E2 (if South Korea were the first association drawn), positions F3 and G4 (if China were the first association drawn and the play-off winners East 4 were drawn to position E3), or positions E2 and G4 (if China were the first association drawn and the play-off winners East 3 were drawn to position E3) respectively.

The following 32 teams entered into the group stage draw, which included the 24 direct entrants and the eight winners of the play-off round of the qualifying play-offs, whose identity was not known at the time of the draw.

Region	Groups	Teams			
West Region	A–D	(United Arab Emirates) Sharjah	(United Arab Emirates) Shabab Al-Ahli	(United Arab Emirates) Al-Wahda	(United Arab Emirates) Al-Ain (Winners of Play-off West 1)
West Region	A–D	(Saudi Arabia) Al-Nassr	(Saudi Arabia) Al-Taawoun	(Saudi Arabia) Al-Hilal	(Saudi Arabia) Al-Ahli (Winners of Play-off West 2)
West Region	A–D	(Qatar) Al-Sadd	(Qatar) Al-Duhail	(Uzbekistan) Pakhtakor	(Iraq) Al-Shorta
West Region	A–D	(Iran) Persepolis	(Iran) Sepahan	(Iran) Esteghlal (Winners of Play-off West 4)	(Iran) Shahr Khodro (Winners of Play-off West 3)
East Region	E–H	(South Korea) Jeonbuk Hyundai Motors	(South Korea) Suwon Samsung Bluewings	(South Korea) Ulsan Hyundai	(South Korea) FC Seoul (Winners of Play-off East 1)
East Region	E–H	(China) Guangzhou Evergrande	(China) Shanghai Shenhua	(China) Beijing FC	(China) Shanghai SIPG (Winners of Play-off East 2)
East Region	E–H	(Japan) Yokohama F. Marinos	(Japan) Vissel Kobe (Note: The identity of the second group stage team from Japan was not known at the time of the group stage draw.)	(Japan) FC Tokyo (Winners of Play-off East 3)	(Thailand) Chiangrai United
East Region	E–H	(Australia) Perth Glory	(Australia) Sydney FC	(Australia) Melbourne Victory (Winners of Play-off East 4)	(Malaysia) Johor Darul Ta'zim

== Format ==
In the group stage, each group was played on a double round-robin basis, with matches played home-and-away before the suspension due to the COVID-19 pandemic, but moved to centralised venues after restart. The winners and runners-up of each group advanced to the round of 16 of the knockout stage.

=== Tiebreakers ===
The teams were ranked according to points (3 points for a win, 1 point for a draw, 0 points for a loss). If tied on points, tiebreakers were applied in the following order (Regulations Article 10.5):

1. Points in head-to-head matches among tied teams;
2. Goal difference in head-to-head matches among tied teams;
3. Goals scored in head-to-head matches among tied teams;
4. ~~Away goals scored in head-to-head matches among tied teams;~~ (this tiebreaker was removed since the matches were played in centralised venues after restart)
5. If more than two teams were tied, and after applying all head-to-head criteria above, a subset of teams were still tied, all head-to-head criteria above were reapplied exclusively to this subset of teams;
6. Goal difference in all group matches;
7. Goals scored in all group matches;
8. Penalty shoot-out if only two teams playing each other in the last round of the group were tied;
9. Disciplinary points (yellow card = 1 point, red card as a result of two yellow cards = 3 points, direct red card = 3 points, yellow card followed by direct red card = 4 points);
10. Association ranking.

== Schedule ==
The original schedule of each match day, as planned before the COVID-19 pandemic, was as follows.

- Matches in the West Region were played on Mondays and Tuesdays. Two groups were played on each day, with the following groups being played on Mondays:
  - Matchdays 1 and 2: Groups A and B
  - Matchday 3: Groups A and C
  - Matchday 4: Groups B and D
  - Matchdays 5 and 6: Groups C and D
- Matches in the East Region were played on Tuesdays and Wednesdays. Two groups were played on each day, with the following groups being played on Tuesdays:
  - Matchdays 1 and 2: Groups E and F
  - Matchday 3: Groups E and G
  - Matchday 4: Groups F and H
  - Matchdays 5 and 6: Groups G and H

Matchday	Original dates	Original scheduled matches
Matchday 1	10–12 February 2020 (12 matches played, 4 postponed)	Team 1 vs. Team 4, Team 3 vs. Team 2
Matchday 2	17–19 February 2020 (13 matches played, 3 postponed)	Team 4 vs. Team 3, Team 2 vs. Team 1
Matchday 3	2–4 March 2020 (2 matches played, 14 postponed)	Team 4 vs. Team 2, Team 1 vs. Team 3
Matchday 4	6–8 April 2020 (all 16 matches postponed)	Team 2 vs. Team 4, Team 3 vs. Team 1
Matchday 5	20–22 April 2020 (all 16 matches postponed)	Team 4 vs. Team 1, Team 2 vs. Team 3
Matchday 6	4–6 May 2020 (all 16 matches postponed)	Team 1 vs. Team 2, Team 3 vs. Team 4

=== Effects of the COVID-19 pandemic ===
Due to the COVID-19 pandemic in Asia, the Australian federal government banned foreigners travelling from China, and Football Federation Australia told the AFC that Australia could no longer host matches against Chinese teams. The AFC held an emergency meeting on 4 February 2020 to determine plans for the tournament, including but not limited to rescheduling of matches in the East Region. After the meeting, the AFC decided to postpone matches involving Chinese clubs from the first three match days except for Chiangrai United versus Beijing FC:

- Group E: FC Seoul v Beijing FC (from 11 February to 28 April), Melbourne Victory v Beijing FC (from 3 March to 28 May)
- Group F: Perth Glory v Shanghai Shenhua (from 11 February to 28 April), Ulsan Hyundai v Shanghai Shenhua (from 18 February to 19 May), FC Tokyo v Shanghai Shenhua (from 4 March to 27 May)
- Group G: Suwon Samsung Bluewings v Guangzhou Evergrande (from 12 February to 29 April), Johor Darul Ta'zim v Guangzhou Evergrande (from 19 February to 20 May), Vissel Kobe v Guangzhou Evergrande (from 3 March to 26 May)
- Group H: Sydney FC v Shanghai SIPG (from 12 February to 29 April), Jeonbuk Hyundai Motors v Shanghai SIPG (from 19 February to 20 May), Yokohama F. Marinos v Shanghai SIPG (from 4 March to 27 May)

the following matches were postponed to a later date between late February and early March, prior to AFC's announcement to postpone all matches:

- Group A: Al-Ahli v Al-Shorta and Al-Wahda v Esteghlal (2 March)
- Group B: Al-Hilal v Pakhtakor and Shabab Al-Ahli v Shahr Khodro (3 March)
- Group C: Persepolis v Al-Taawoun and Al-Duhail v Sharjah (2 March)
- Group D: Al-Ain v Al-Sadd and Sepahan v Al-Nassr (3 March), Al-Nassr v Sepahan (6 April)
- Group E: FC Seoul v Chiangrai United (3 March)
- Group F: Perth Glory v Ulsan Hyundai (4 March, later postponed to 18 March)

After meetings with representatives of the member associations from the West Region held on 7–8 March 2020, it was agreed that all West Region group stage matches on matchdays 4–6 would be postponed to new dates yet to be confirmed due to the COVID-19 pandemic in Asia.

After a meeting with representatives of the member associations from the East Region held on 2 March 2020, it was agreed that group stage matches on matchdays 3–6 which could not be played would be moved to 19–20 May, 26–27 May, 16–17 June and 23–24 June.

The AFC announced on 14 April 2020 that all matches scheduled for May and June would be postponed until further notice. Only 27 group stage matches out of the 96 scheduled had been played by then.

On 9 July 2020, the AFC announced the new schedule for the remaining matches, with all matches played at centralised venues. The West Region matches postponed from matchdays 3–6 would be played on 14–15, 17–18, 20–21 and 23–24 September, and the East Region matches postponed from matchdays 1–6 would be played on 16–17, 19–20, 22–23, 25–26, 28–29 October and 31 October – 1 November. On 10 September 2020, the AFC announced that East Region group stage matches were rescheduled to be played on 18–19, 21–22, 24–25, 27–28 November, 30 November – 1 December and 3–4 December.

Matchday	West Region	East Region
Matchday 1	—	18–19 November 2020 (3 matches)
Matchday 2	—	21–22 November 2020 (4 matches)
Matchday 3	14–15 September 2020	24–25 November 2020
Matchday 4	17–18 September 2020	27–28 November 2020 (6 matches)
Matchday 5	20–21 September 2020	30 November – 1 December 2020
Matchday 6	23–24 September 2020	3–4 December 2020

=== Centralised venues after restart ===
On 16 July 2020, the AFC announced that Qatar would host all West Region matches after restart. On 27 July 2020, the AFC announced that Malaysia would host the East Region matches of Groups G and H after restart. However, on 9 October 2020, the AFC announced that following an agreement with Qatar Football Association, all East Region matches after restart would also be played in Qatar.

The following centralised venues in Qatar were used:

- Al Janoub Stadium, Al Wakrah (1 match of Group A, 7 matches of Group B, 2 matches of Group G, 6 matches of Group H)
- Education City Stadium, Al Rayyan (7 matches of Group C, 1 match of Group D, 2 matches of Group E, 9 matches of Group F)
- Jassim bin Hamad Stadium, Al Rayyan (1 match of Group C, 7 matches of Group D, 7 matches of Group E, 1 match of Group F)
- Khalifa International Stadium, Al Rayyan (7 matches of Group A, 1 match of Group B, 7 matches of Group G, 3 matches of Group H)

== Groups ==
=== Group A ===
Pos	Team	Pld	W	D	L	GF	GA	GD	Pts	Qualification	AHL	EST	SHO	WAH
1	(Saudi Arabia) Al-Ahli	4	2	0	2	4	6	−2	6	Advance to knockout stage	—	2–1	1–0	~~20 Sep~~
2	(Iran) Esteghlal	4	1	2	1	6	4	+2	5	Advance to knockout stage	3–0	—	1–1	~~17 Sep~~
3	(Iraq) Al-Shorta	4	1	2	1	4	4	0	5		2–1	1–1	—	~~0–1~~
4	(United Arab Emirates) Al-Wahda	0	0	0	0	0	0	0	0	Withdrew, results expunged (Note: Al-Wahda were unable to travel to Qatar to play the final four matches of the group stage due to several team members having tested positive for COVID-19. They were considered to have withdrawn from the competition, and their results were expunged.)	~~1–1~~	~~14 Sep~~	~~23 Sep~~	—

Source: AFC
Rules for classification: Tiebreakers
Notes:
10 February 2020 (Note: The Football Federation Islamic Republic of Iran received a letter from the Asian Football Confederation on 17 January 2020 announcing that teams from Iran would not be allowed to host their home matches in their country due to security concerns. The four AFC Champions League teams from Iran announced on 18 January 2020 that they would withdraw from the tournament if the ban was not reversed. The AFC announced on 23 January 2020 that any group stage matches which the Iranian teams were supposed to host on matchdays 1, 2 and 3 would be switched with the corresponding away matches to allow time to reassess the security concerns in the country.)
17:30 UTC+3

Al-Shorta (Iraq)	1–1	(Iran) Esteghlal
Faez 48' (pen.)	Live Report; Stats Report	Kadhim 24' (o.g.)

Franso Hariri Stadium, Erbil (Note: Al-Shorta play their home matches at Franso Hariri Stadium, Erbil, instead of their regular home stadium Al-Shaab Stadium, Baghdad.)
Attendance: 6,750
Referee: Ahmed Al-Ali (Jordan)
10 February 2020
19:35 UTC+4

Al-Wahda (United Arab Emirates)	Voided (1–1)	(Saudi Arabia) Al-Ahli
Rim Chang-woo 90'	Live Report; Stats Report	Asiri 60'

Al Nahyan Stadium, Abu Dhabi
Attendance: 7,124
Referee: Ahmed Al-Kaf (Oman)

17 February 2020
17:00 UTC+3

Al-Shorta (Iraq)	Voided (0–1)	(United Arab Emirates) Al-Wahda
	Live Report; Stats Report	M'Poku 88'

Franso Hariri Stadium, Erbil
Attendance: 4,327
Referee: Nazmi Nasaruddin (Malaysia)
17 February 2020
18:30 UTC+3

Al-Ahli (Saudi Arabia)	2–1	(Iran) Esteghlal
Al-Moasher 17' (pen.), 29'	Live Report; Stats Report	Motahari 22'

Jaber Al-Ahmad International Stadium, Kuwait City (Kuwait) (Note: Matches between teams from Iran and Saudi Arabia are played on neutral venues due to deterioration of Iran–Saudi Arabia relations.)
Attendance: 6,740
Referee: Ko Hyung-jin (South Korea)

14 September 2020
18:00 UTC+3

Al-Ahli (Saudi Arabia)	1–0	(Iraq) Al-Shorta
Marin 87'	Live Report; Stats Report

Khalifa International Stadium, Al Rayyan
Attendance: 0
Referee: Nawaf Shukralla (Bahrain)
14 September 2020
21:00 UTC+3

Al-Wahda (United Arab Emirates)	Cancelled	(Iran) Esteghlal
	Live Report; Stats Report

Khalifa International Stadium, Al Rayyan

17 September 2020
18:00 UTC+3

Al-Shorta (Iraq)	2–1	(Saudi Arabia) Al-Ahli
Natiq 14'; Fayyadh 65'	Live Report; Stats Report	Al-Majhad 56'

Khalifa International Stadium, Al Rayyan
Attendance: 0
Referee: Sherzod Kasimov (Uzbekistan)
17 September 2020
21:00 UTC+3

Esteghlal (Iran)	Cancelled	(United Arab Emirates) Al-Wahda
	Live Report; Stats Report

Khalifa International Stadium, Al Rayyan

20 September 2020
18:00 UTC+3

Al-Ahli (Saudi Arabia)	Cancelled	(United Arab Emirates) Al-Wahda
	Live Report; Stats Report

Khalifa International Stadium, Al Rayyan
20 September 2020
21:00 UTC+3

Esteghlal (Iran)	1–1	(Iraq) Al-Shorta
Motahari 68'	Live Report; Stats Report	Fayyadh 26'

Khalifa International Stadium, Al Rayyan
Attendance: 0
Referee: Ko Hyung-jin (South Korea)

23 September 2020
18:00 UTC+3

Al-Wahda (United Arab Emirates)	Cancelled	(Iraq) Al-Shorta
	Live Report; Stats Report

Khalifa International Stadium, Al Rayyan
23 September 2020
18:00 UTC+3

Esteghlal (Iran)	3–0	(Saudi Arabia) Al-Ahli
Ghayedi 29'; Karimi 38'; Diabaté 54'	Live Report; Stats Report

Al Janoub Stadium, Al Wakrah
Attendance: 0
Referee: Adham Makhadmeh (Jordan)

=== Group B ===
Pos	Team	Pld	W	D	L	GF	GA	GD	Pts	Qualification	PAK	SAH	SHK	HIL
1	(Uzbekistan) Pakhtakor	4	3	1	0	6	1	+5	10	Advance to knockout stage	—	2–1	3–0	~~0–0~~
2	(United Arab Emirates) Shabab Al-Ahli	4	2	1	1	3	2	+1	7	Advance to knockout stage	0–0	—	1–0	~~1–2~~
3	(Iran) Shahr Khodro	4	0	0	4	0	6	−6	0		0–1	0–1	—	~~0–0~~
4	(Saudi Arabia) Al-Hilal	0	0	0	0	0	0	0	0	Withdrew, results expunged (Note: Al-Hilal were unable to play their final match of the group stage against Shabab Al-Ahli due to having only 11 fit players after various team members tested positive for COVID-19. They were considered to have withdrawn from the competition, and their results were expunged.)	~~2–1~~	~~23 Sep~~	~~2–0~~	—

Source: AFC
Rules for classification: Tiebreakers
Notes:
10 February 2020
16:00 UTC+5

Pakhtakor (Uzbekistan)	2–1	(United Arab Emirates) Shabab Al-Ahli
Masharipov 18'; Ćeran 70'	Live Report; Stats Report	Conde 67'

Pakhtakor Central Stadium, Tashkent
Attendance: 10,476
Referee: Adham Makhadmeh (Jordan)
10 February 2020
18:40 UTC+4

Al-Hilal (Saudi Arabia)	Voided (2–0)	(Iran) Shahr Khodro
Carrillo 45'; Gomis 69'	Live Report; Stats Report

Zabeel Stadium, Dubai (United Arab Emirates)
Attendance: 3,801
Referee: Ko Hyung-jin (South Korea)

17 February 2020
16:00 UTC+5

Pakhtakor (Uzbekistan)	3–0	(Iran) Shahr Khodro
Sergeev 56', 59'; Azamov 87'	Live Report; Stats Report

Pakhtakor Central Stadium, Tashkent
Attendance: 19,420
Referee: Hettikamkanamge Perera (Sri Lanka)
17 February 2020
17:30 UTC+4

Shabab Al-Ahli (United Arab Emirates)	Voided (1–2)	(Saudi Arabia) Al-Hilal
Jaber 24'	Live Report; Stats Report	Gomis 36', 72'

Rashid Stadium, Dubai
Attendance: 6,240
Referee: Hiroyuki Kimura (Japan)

14 September 2020
18:00 UTC+3

Shabab Al-Ahli (United Arab Emirates)	1–0	(Iran) Shahr Khodro
Abdullah 75'	Live Report; Stats Report

Al Janoub Stadium, Al Wakrah
Attendance: 0
Referee: Ali Sabah (Iraq)
14 September 2020
21:00 UTC+3

Al-Hilal (Saudi Arabia)	Voided (2–1)	(Uzbekistan) Pakhtakor
Giovinco 45+2'; Bahebri 90+7'	Live Report; Stats Report	Derdiyok 70'

Al Janoub Stadium, Al Wakrah
Attendance: 0
Referee: Ko Hyung-jin (South Korea)

17 September 2020
18:00 UTC+3

Shahr Khodro (Iran)	0–1	(United Arab Emirates) Shabab Al-Ahli
	Live Report; Stats Report	Conde 83'

Al Janoub Stadium, Al Wakrah
Attendance: 0
Referee: Hanna Hattab (Syria)
17 September 2020
21:00 UTC+3

Pakhtakor (Uzbekistan)	Voided (0–0)	(Saudi Arabia) Al-Hilal
	Live Report; Stats Report

Al Janoub Stadium, Al Wakrah
Attendance: 0
Referee: Nawaf Shukralla (Bahrain)

20 September 2020
18:00 UTC+3

Shahr Khodro (Iran)	Voided (0–0)	(Saudi Arabia) Al-Hilal
	Live Report; Stats Report

Al Janoub Stadium, Al Wakrah
Attendance: 0
Referee: Ahmed Al-Ali (Jordan)
20 September 2020
21:00 UTC+3

Shabab Al-Ahli (United Arab Emirates)	0–0	(Uzbekistan) Pakhtakor
	Live Report; Stats Report

Al Janoub Stadium, Al Wakrah
Attendance: 0
Referee: Muhammad Taqi (Singapore)

23 September 2020
21:00 UTC+3

Al-Hilal (Saudi Arabia)	Cancelled	(United Arab Emirates) Shabab Al-Ahli
	Live Report; Stats Report

Khalifa International Stadium, Al Rayyan
Referee: Ahmed Al-Kaf (Oman)
23 September 2020
21:00 UTC+3

Shahr Khodro (Iran)	0–1	(Uzbekistan) Pakhtakor
	Live Report; Stats Report	Masharipov 65'

Al Janoub Stadium, Al Wakrah
Attendance: 0
Referee: Hanna Hattab (Syria)

=== Group C ===
Pos	Team	Pld	W	D	L	GF	GA	GD	Pts	Qualification	PRS	TAW	DUH	SHJ
1	(Iran) Persepolis	6	3	1	2	8	5	+3	10	Advance to knockout stage	—	1–0	0–1	4–0
2	(Saudi Arabia) Al-Taawoun	6	3	0	3	4	8	−4	9 (Note: Head-to-head points: Al-Taawoun 6, Al-Duhail 0.)	Advance to knockout stage	0–1	—	2–0	0–6
3	(Qatar) Al-Duhail	6	3	0	3	7	8	−1	9		2–0	0–1	—	2–1
4	(United Arab Emirates) Sharjah	6	2	1	3	13	11	+2	7		2–2	0–1	4–2	—

Source: AFC
Rules for classification: Tiebreakers
Notes:
11 February 2020
18:15 UTC+3

Al-Duhail (Qatar)	2–0	(Iran) Persepolis
Mandžukić 5'; Edmilson 13'	Live Report; Stats Report

Abdullah bin Khalifa Stadium, Doha
Attendance: 3,780
Referee: Aziz Asimov (Uzbekistan)
11 February 2020
18:55 UTC+4

Sharjah (United Arab Emirates)	0–1	(Saudi Arabia) Al-Taawoun
	Live Report; Stats Report	Darwish 34'

Sharjah Stadium, Sharjah
Attendance: 8,523
Referee: Ryuji Sato (Japan)

18 February 2020
19:35 UTC+4

Sharjah (United Arab Emirates)	2–2	(Iran) Persepolis
Khalfan 25'; Mendes 45+1'	Live Report; Stats Report	Alipour 9', 27'

Sharjah Stadium, Sharjah
Attendance: 5,200
Referee: Chris Beath (Australia)
18 February 2020
18:35 UTC+3

Al-Taawoun (Saudi Arabia)	2–0	(Qatar) Al-Duhail
Al-Sahlawi 34'; Al-Swat 55'	Live Report; Stats Report

King Abdullah Sport City Stadium, Buraidah
Attendance: 15,346
Referee: Adham Makhadmeh (Jordan)

15 September 2020
18:00 UTC+3

Al-Duhail (Qatar)	2–1	(United Arab Emirates) Sharjah
Ali 41'; Rezaeian 51'	Live Report; Stats Report	Coronado 58' (pen.)

Education City Stadium, Al Rayyan
Attendance: 0
Referee: Muhammad Taqi (Singapore)
15 September 2020
21:00 UTC+3

Persepolis (Iran)	1–0	(Saudi Arabia) Al-Taawoun
Khalilzadeh 83'	Live Report; Stats Report

Education City Stadium, Al Rayyan
Attendance: 10
Referee: Ahmed Al-Kaf (Oman)

18 September 2020
18:00 UTC+3

Sharjah (United Arab Emirates)	4–2	(Qatar) Al-Duhail
Ba Wazir 18'; Suroor 62'; Coronado 75' (pen.); Caio 90+1'	Live Report; Stats Report	Al-Ahrak 12'; Ali 70'

Education City Stadium, Al Rayyan
Attendance: 0
Referee: Omar Al-Yaqoubi (Oman)
18 September 2020
21:00 UTC+3

Al-Taawoun (Saudi Arabia)	0–1	(Iran) Persepolis
	Live Report; Stats Report	Rasan 48' (pen.)

Education City Stadium, Al Rayyan
Attendance: 10
Referee: Mohanad Qasim (Iraq)

21 September 2020
18:00 UTC+3

Persepolis (Iran)	0–1	(Qatar) Al-Duhail
	Live Report; Stats Report	Ali 60' (pen.)

Education City Stadium, Al Rayyan
Attendance: 0
Referee: Hettikamkanamge Perera (Sri Lanka)
21 September 2020
21:00 UTC+3

Al-Taawoun (Saudi Arabia)	0–6	(United Arab Emirates) Sharjah
	Live Report; Stats Report	Rashid 45+1'; Welliton 49', 57', 61'; Abdulbasit 54'; Caio 68'

Education City Stadium, Al Rayyan
Attendance: 10
Referee: Kim Dae-yong (South Korea)

24 September 2020
21:00 UTC+3

Al-Duhail (Qatar)	0–1	(Saudi Arabia) Al-Taawoun
	Live Report; Stats Report	Duke 86'

Education City Stadium, Al Rayyan
Attendance: 10
Referee: Mohd Amirul Izwan Yaacob (Malaysia)
24 September 2020
21:00 UTC+3

Persepolis (Iran)	4–0	(United Arab Emirates) Sharjah
Khalilzadeh 2'; Alekasir 41'; Amiri 44'; Abdi 90+1'	Live Report; Stats Report

Jassim bin Hamad Stadium, Al Rayyan
Attendance: 0
Referee: Ilgiz Tantashev (Uzbekistan)

=== Group D ===
Pos	Team	Pld	W	D	L	GF	GA	GD	Pts	Qualification	NAS	SAD	SEP	AIN
1	(Saudi Arabia) Al-Nassr	6	3	2	1	9	5	+4	11	Advance to knockout stage	—	2–2	2–0	0–1
2	(Qatar) Al-Sadd	6	2	3	1	14	8	+6	9	Advance to knockout stage	1–1	—	3–0	4–0
3	(Iran) Sepahan	6	2	1	3	6	8	−2	7		0–2	2–1	—	0–0
4	(United Arab Emirates) Al-Ain	6	1	2	3	5	13	−8	5		1–2	3–3	0–4	—

Source: AFC
Rules for classification: Tiebreakers
11 February 2020
18:50 UTC+4

Al-Ain (United Arab Emirates)	0–4	(Iran) Sepahan
	Live Report; Stats Report	Mohebi 38'; Kiros 46'; Rafiei 52'; Tayyebi 78'

Hazza bin Zayed Stadium, Al Ain
Attendance: 7,028
Referee: Hiroyuki Kimura (Japan)
11 February 2020
18:15 UTC+3

Al-Nassr (Saudi Arabia)	2–2	(Qatar) Al-Sadd
Hamdallah 7'; Al-Obaid 53'	Live Report; Stats Report	Al-Amri 9' (o.g.); Al-Haydos 48'

Prince Faisal bin Fahd Stadium, Riyadh
Attendance: 11,828
Referee: Chris Beath (Australia)

18 February 2020
18:55 UTC+4

Al-Ain (United Arab Emirates)	1–2	(Saudi Arabia) Al-Nassr
Yaisien 18'	Live Report; Stats Report	Ali 57'; Hamdallah 80'

Hazza bin Zayed Stadium, Al Ain
Attendance: 7,326
Referee: Nawaf Shukralla (Bahrain)
18 February 2020
18:35 UTC+3

Al-Sadd (Qatar)	3–0	(Iran) Sepahan
Afif 51'; Al-Haydos 72', 78'	Live Report; Stats Report

Jassim bin Hamad Stadium, Al Rayyan
Attendance: 5,843
Referee: Aziz Asimov (Uzbekistan)

15 September 2020
18:00 UTC+3

Al-Ain (United Arab Emirates)	3–3	(Qatar) Al-Sadd
Laba 5'; Islamkhan 38'; Khoukhi 67' (o.g.)	Live Report; Stats Report	Afif 35'; Cazorla 55'; Bounedjah 60'

Jassim bin Hamad Stadium, Al Rayyan
Attendance: 0
Referee: Hettikamkanamge Perera (Sri Lanka)
15 September 2020
21:00 UTC+3

Sepahan (Iran)	0–2	(Saudi Arabia) Al-Nassr
	Live Report; Stats Report	Hamdallah 29', 48'

Jassim bin Hamad Stadium, Al Rayyan
Attendance: 0
Referee: Adham Makhadmeh (Jordan)

18 September 2020
18:00 UTC+3

Al-Sadd (Qatar)	4–0	(United Arab Emirates) Al-Ain
Bounedjah 26', 70'; Afif 56'; Tabata 86'	Live Report; Stats Report

Jassim bin Hamad Stadium, Al Rayyan
Attendance: 0
Referee: Mohd Amirul Izwan Yaacob (Malaysia)
18 September 2020
21:00 UTC+3

Al-Nassr (Saudi Arabia)	2–0	(Iran) Sepahan
Madu 32'; Hamdallah 41'	Live Report; Stats Report

Jassim bin Hamad Stadium, Al Rayyan
Attendance: 0
Referee: Ilgiz Tantashev (Uzbekistan)

21 September 2020
18:00 UTC+3

Al-Sadd (Qatar)	1–1	(Saudi Arabia) Al-Nassr
Bounedjah 87'	Live Report; Stats Report	Al-Ghannam 22'

Jassim bin Hamad Stadium, Al Rayyan
Attendance: 0
Referee: Masoud Tufayelieh (Syria)
21 September 2020
21:00 UTC+3

Sepahan (Iran)	0–0	(United Arab Emirates) Al-Ain
	Live Report; Stats Report

Jassim bin Hamad Stadium, Al Rayyan
Attendance: 0
Referee: Ali Shaban (Kuwait)

24 September 2020
18:00 UTC+3

Sepahan (Iran)	2–1	(Qatar) Al-Sadd
Mirzaei 14'; Shahbazzadeh 53'	Live Report; Stats Report	Ali 82'

Jassim bin Hamad Stadium, Al Rayyan
Attendance: 0
Referee: Sivakorn Pu-udom (Thailand)
24 September 2020
18:00 UTC+3

Al-Nassr (Saudi Arabia)	0–1	(United Arab Emirates) Al-Ain
	Live Report; Stats Report	Laba 19'

Education City Stadium, Al Rayyan
Attendance: 0
Referee: Hussein Abo Yehia (Lebanon)

=== Group E ===
Pos	Team	Pld	W	D	L	GF	GA	GD	Pts	Qualification	BEI	MVC	SEO	CHI
1	(China) Beijing Guoan	6	5	1	0	12	4	+8	16	Advance to knockout stage	—	3–1	3–1	1–1
2	(Australia) Melbourne Victory	6	2	1	3	6	9	−3	7	Advance to knockout stage	0–2	—	2–1	1–0
3	(South Korea) FC Seoul	6	2	0	4	10	9	+1	6		1–2	1–0	—	5–0
4	(Thailand) Chiangrai United	6	1	2	3	5	11	−6	5		0–1	2–2	2–1	—

Source: AFC
Rules for classification: Tiebreakers
11 February 2020
19:35 UTC+11

Melbourne Victory (Australia)	1–0	(Thailand) Chiangrai United
Toivonen 25' (pen.)	Live Report; Stats Report

AAMI Park, Melbourne
Attendance: 4,156
Referee: Turki Al-Khudhayr (Saudi Arabia)

18 February 2020
19:30 UTC+9

FC Seoul (South Korea)	1–0	(Australia) Melbourne Victory
Park Chu-young 8'	Live Report; Stats Report

Seoul World Cup Stadium, Seoul
Attendance: 5,229
Referee: Abdulrahman Al-Jassim (Qatar)
18 February 2020 (Note: The AFC announced on 29 January 2020 that the group stage matches which Chinese teams were supposed to host on matchdays 1, 2, and 3 would be switched with the corresponding away matches due to the COVID-19 pandemic in China. Later, the order of matches between Beijing FC and Melbourne Victory, Guangzhou Evergrande and Vissel Kobe, and Shanghai SIPG and Yokohama F. Marinos, were switched from the revised schedule.)
19:00 UTC+7

Chiangrai United (Thailand)	0–1	(China) Beijing FC
	Live Report; Stats Report	Wang Ziming 23'

Singha Stadium, Chiang Rai
Attendance: 6,035
Referee: Hanna Hattab (Syria)

21 November 2020
13:00 UTC+3

FC Seoul (South Korea)	1–2	(China) Beijing FC
Park Chu-young 66' (pen.)	Live Report; Stats Report	Fernando 8'; Alan 60'

Education City Stadium, Al Rayyan
Attendance: 0
Referee: Turki Al-Khudhayr (Saudi Arabia)

24 November 2020
13:00 UTC+3

Beijing FC (China)	3–1	(Australia) Melbourne Victory
Augusto 22'; Alan 34'; Wang Ziming 74'	Live Report; Stats Report	Iannucci 78'

Jassim bin Hamad Stadium, Al Rayyan
Attendance: 0
Referee: Saoud Al-Athbah (Qatar)
24 November 2020
16:00 UTC+3

FC Seoul (South Korea)	5–0	(Thailand) Chiangrai United
Han Seung-gyu 20'; Jung Han-min 54'; Yun Ju-tae 67', 71'; Lee In-gyu 90+2'	Live Report; Stats Report

Jassim bin Hamad Stadium, Al Rayyan
Attendance: 0
Referee: Mooud Bonyadifar (Iran)

27 November 2020
13:00 UTC+3

Melbourne Victory (Australia)	0–2	(China) Beijing FC
	Live Report; Stats Report	Viera 9'; Zhang Yuning 35'

Jassim bin Hamad Stadium, Al Rayyan
Attendance: 0
Referee: Mohd Amirul Izwan Yaacob (Malaysia)
27 November 2020
16:00 UTC+3

Chiangrai United (Thailand)	2–1	(South Korea) FC Seoul
Bill 40', 89'	Live Report; Stats Report	Park Chu-young 59'

Jassim bin Hamad Stadium, Al Rayyan
Attendance: 0
Referee: Ali Shaban (Kuwait)

30 November 2020
13:00 UTC+3

Beijing FC (China)	3–1	(South Korea) FC Seoul
Viera 23'; Augusto 43'; Zhang Yuning 90+3'	Live Report; Stats Report	Yun Ju-tae 89'

Jassim bin Hamad Stadium, Al Rayyan
Attendance: 0
Referee: Muhammad Taqi (Singapore)
30 November 2020
16:00 UTC+3

Chiangrai United (Thailand)	2–2	(Australia) Melbourne Victory
Sivakorn 47'; Verzura 82'	Live Report; Stats Report	Brimmer 8' (pen.); Folami 27'

Jassim bin Hamad Stadium, Al Rayyan
Attendance: 0
Referee: Ilgiz Tantashev (Uzbekistan)

3 December 2020
16:00 UTC+3

Melbourne Victory (Australia)	2–1	(South Korea) FC Seoul
Rojas 5'; Brimmer 23' (pen.)	Live Report; Stats Report	Hwang Hyun-soo 64'

Education City Stadium, Al Rayyan
Attendance: 0
Referee: Abdulrahman Al-Jassim (Qatar)
3 December 2020
16:00 UTC+3

Beijing FC (China)	1–1	(Thailand) Chiangrai United
Alan 76'	Live Report; Stats Report	Ekanit 55'

Jassim bin Hamad Stadium, Al Rayyan
Attendance: 0
Referee: Hussein Abo Yehia (Lebanon)

=== Group F ===
Pos	Team	Pld	W	D	L	GF	GA	GD	Pts	Qualification	ULS	TOK	SSH	PRG
1	(South Korea) Ulsan Hyundai	6	5	1	0	14	5	+9	16	Advance to knockout stage	—	1–1	3–1	2–0
2	(Japan) FC Tokyo	6	3	1	2	6	5	+1	10	Advance to knockout stage	1–2	—	0–1	1–0
3	(China) Shanghai Shenhua	6	2	1	3	9	13	−4	7		1–4	1–2	—	3–3
4	(Australia) Perth Glory	6	0	1	5	5	11	−6	1		1–2	0–1	1–2	—

Source: AFC
Rules for classification: Tiebreakers
11 February 2020
19:30 UTC+9

Ulsan Hyundai (South Korea)	1–1	(Japan) FC Tokyo
Adaílton 82' (o.g.)	Live Report; Stats Report	Oliveira 64'

Ulsan Munsu Football Stadium, Ulsan
Attendance: 3,350
Referee: Hettikamkanamge Perera (Sri Lanka)

18 February 2020
19:00 UTC+9

FC Tokyo (Japan)	1–0	(Australia) Perth Glory
Leandro 82'	Live Report; Stats Report

Ajinomoto Stadium, Tokyo
Attendance: 7,755
Referee: Yaqoob Abdul Baki (Oman)

18 November 2020
13:00 UTC+3

Perth Glory (Australia)	1–2	(China) Shanghai Shenhua
Aspropotamitis 81'	Live Report; Stats Report	Peng Xinli 7'; Yu Hanchao 38'

Education City Stadium, Al Rayyan
Attendance: 0
Referee: Mohammed Abdulla Hassan Mohamed (United Arab Emirates)

21 November 2020
16:00 UTC+3

Ulsan Hyundai (South Korea)	3–1	(China) Shanghai Shenhua
Yoon Bit-garam 19', 41'; Kim Kee-hee 63'	Live Report; Stats Report	Zhu Jianrong 89'

Education City Stadium, Al Rayyan
Attendance: 0
Referee: Khamis Al-Marri (Qatar)

24 November 2020
13:00 UTC+3

FC Tokyo (Japan)	0–1	(China) Shanghai Shenhua
	Live Report; Stats Report	Yu Hanchao 72' (pen.)

Education City Stadium, Al Rayyan
Attendance: 0
Referee: Adham Makhadmeh (Jordan)
24 November 2020 (Note: Due to the COVID-19 pandemic in South Korea, the order of matches between Ulsan Hyundai and Perth Glory was switched.)
16:00 UTC+3

Perth Glory (Australia)	1–2	(South Korea) Ulsan Hyundai
Stynes 71'	Live Report; Stats Report	Kim In-sung 89'; Júnior 90+3'

Education City Stadium, Al Rayyan
Attendance: 0
Referee: Nazmi Nasaruddin (Malaysia)

27 November 2020
13:00 UTC+3

Ulsan Hyundai (South Korea)	2–0	(Australia) Perth Glory
Kim In-sung 87'; Júnior 89'	Live Report; Stats Report

Education City Stadium, Al Rayyan
Attendance: 0
Referee: Sivakorn Pu-udom (Thailand)
27 November 2020
16:00 UTC+3

Shanghai Shenhua (China)	1–2	(Japan) FC Tokyo
Moreno 86'	Live Report; Stats Report	Leandro 61'; Abe 82'

Education City Stadium, Al Rayyan
Attendance: 0
Referee: Mohanad Qasim (Iraq)

30 November 2020
13:00 UTC+3

FC Tokyo (Japan)	1–2	(South Korea) Ulsan Hyundai
Nagai 1'	Live Report; Stats Report	Yoon Bit-garam 44', 85'

Education City Stadium, Al Rayyan
Attendance: 0
Referee: Khamis Al-Marri (Qatar)
30 November 2020
16:00 UTC+3

Shanghai Shenhua (China)	3–3	(Australia) Perth Glory
Moreno 62', 72'; Yu Hanchao 73'	Live Report; Stats Report	Fornaroli 45+2'; Armiento 58'; Kilkenny 86' (pen.)

Education City Stadium, Al Rayyan
Attendance: 0
Referee: Hettikamkanamge Perera (Sri Lanka)

3 December 2020
13:00 UTC+3

Perth Glory (Australia)	0–1	(Japan) FC Tokyo
	Live Report; Stats Report	Adaílton 8'

Education City Stadium, Al Rayyan
Attendance: 0
Referee: Hanna Hattab (Syria)
3 December 2020
13:00 UTC+3

Shanghai Shenhua (China)	1–4	(South Korea) Ulsan Hyundai
Bi Jinhao 60'	Live Report; Stats Report	Park Jeong-in 3'; Lee Sang-heon 24'; Johnsen 75' (pen.), 90'

Jassim bin Hamad Stadium, Al Rayyan
Attendance: 0
Referee: Muhammad Taqi (Singapore)

=== Group G ===
Pos	Team	Pld	W	D	L	GF	GA	GD	Pts	Qualification	VIS	SUW	GZE	JDT
1	(Japan) Vissel Kobe	4	2	0	2	4	5	−1	6	Advance to knockout stage	—	0–2	0–2	~~5–1~~
2	(South Korea) Suwon Samsung Bluewings	4	1	2	1	3	2	+1	5	Advance to knockout stage	0–1	—	0–0	~~25 Nov~~
3	(China) Guangzhou Evergrande	4	1	2	1	4	4	0	5		1–3	1–1	—	~~4 Dec~~
4	(Malaysia) Johor Darul Ta'zim	0	0	0	0	0	0	0	0	Withdrew, results expunged (Note: Johor Darul Ta'zim were unable to travel to Qatar to play the final four matches of the group stage after their application for permission to travel was refused by the Malaysian government due to COVID-19 pandemic travel restrictions. They were considered to have withdrawn from the competition, and their results were expunged.)	~~1 Dec~~	~~2–1~~	~~19 Nov~~	—

Source: AFC
Rules for classification: Tiebreakers
Notes:
12 February 2020
19:00 UTC+9

Vissel Kobe (Japan)	Voided (5–1)	(Malaysia) Johor Darul Ta'zim
Ogawa 13', 58', 72'; Furuhashi 28'; Douglas 65'	Live Report; Stats Report	Safawi 27' (pen.)

Noevir Stadium Kobe, Kobe
Attendance: 7,256
Referee: Alireza Faghani (Iran)

19 February 2020
19:30 UTC+9

Suwon Samsung Bluewings (South Korea)	0–1	(Japan) Vissel Kobe
	Live Report; Stats Report	Furuhashi 90'

Suwon World Cup Stadium, Suwon
Attendance: 17,372
Referee: Mohanad Qasim (Iraq)

3 March 2020
20:45 UTC+8

Johor Darul Ta'zim (Malaysia)	Voided (2–1)	(South Korea) Suwon Samsung Bluewings
Cabrera 13' (pen.); Maurício 73'	Live Report; Stats Report	Antonis 51'

Sultan Ibrahim Larkin Stadium, Johor
Attendance: 25,524
Referee: Alireza Faghani (Iran)

19 November 2020
16:00 UTC+3

Johor Darul Ta'zim (Malaysia)	Cancelled	(China) Guangzhou Evergrande
	Live Report; Stats Report

Khalifa International Stadium, Al Rayyan

22 November 2020
13:00 UTC+3

Suwon Samsung Bluewings (South Korea)	0–0	(China) Guangzhou Evergrande
	Live Report; Stats Report

Khalifa International Stadium, Al Rayyan
Attendance: 0
Referee: Chris Beath (Australia)

25 November 2020
13:00 UTC+3

Guangzhou Evergrande (China)	1–3	(Japan) Vissel Kobe
Furuhashi 55' (o.g.)	Live Report; Stats Report	Furuhashi 44'; Douglas 74'; Iniesta 84'

Khalifa International Stadium, Al Rayyan
Attendance: 0
Referee: Nawaf Shukralla (Bahrain)
25 November 2020
16:00 UTC+3

Suwon Samsung Bluewings (South Korea)	Cancelled	(Malaysia) Johor Darul Ta'zim
	Live Report; Stats Report

Khalifa International Stadium, Al Rayyan

28 November 2020
13:00 UTC+3

Vissel Kobe (Japan)	0–2	(China) Guangzhou Evergrande
	Live Report; Stats Report	Talisca 17' (pen.); Ai Kesen 36'

Al Janoub Stadium, Al Wakrah
Attendance: 0
Referee: Alireza Faghani (Iran)

1 December 2020
13:00 UTC+3

Guangzhou Evergrande (China)	1–1	(South Korea) Suwon Samsung Bluewings
Wei Shihao 72'	Live Report; Stats Report	Lim Sang-hyub 53'

Khalifa International Stadium, Al Rayyan
Attendance: 0
Referee: Adham Makhadmeh (Jordan)
1 December 2020
16:00 UTC+3

Johor Darul Ta'zim (Malaysia)	Cancelled	(Japan) Vissel Kobe
	Live Report; Stats Report

Khalifa International Stadium, Al Rayyan

4 December 2020
16:00 UTC+3

Guangzhou Evergrande (China)	Cancelled	(Malaysia) Johor Darul Ta'zim
	Live Report; Stats Report

Al Janoub Stadium, Al Wakrah
4 December 2020
16:00 UTC+3

Vissel Kobe (Japan)	0–2	(South Korea) Suwon Samsung Bluewings
	Live Report; Stats Report	Kim Gun-hee 49'; Lim Sang-hyub 68' (pen.)

Khalifa International Stadium, Al Rayyan
Attendance: 0
Referee: Ali Sabah (Iraq)

=== Group H ===
Pos	Team	Pld	W	D	L	GF	GA	GD	Pts	Qualification	YOK	SSI	JEO	SYD
1	(Japan) Yokohama F. Marinos	6	4	1	1	13	5	+8	13	Advance to knockout stage	—	1–2	4–1	4–0
2	(China) Shanghai SIPG	6	3	0	3	6	10	−4	9	Advance to knockout stage	0–1	—	0–2	0–4
3	(South Korea) Jeonbuk Hyundai Motors	6	2	1	3	8	10	−2	7		1–2	1–2	—	1–0
4	(Australia) Sydney FC	6	1	2	3	8	10	−2	5		1–1	1–2	2–2	—

Source: AFC
Rules for classification: Tiebreakers
12 February 2020
19:00 UTC+9

Jeonbuk Hyundai Motors (South Korea)	1–2	(Japan) Yokohama F. Marinos
Cho Gue-sung 80'	Live Report; Stats Report	Endo 32'; Kim Jin-su 37' (o.g.)

Jeonju World Cup Stadium, Jeonju
Attendance: 6,546
Referee: Mohammed Abdulla Hassan Mohamed (United Arab Emirates)

19 February 2020
19:30 UTC+9

Yokohama F. Marinos (Japan)	4–0	(Australia) Sydney FC
Onaiwu 12', 51'; Nakagawa 31', 33'	Live Report; Stats Report

Nissan Stadium, Yokohama
Attendance: 11,863
Referee: Mooud Bonyadifar (Iran)

4 March 2020
19:30 UTC+11

Sydney FC (Australia)	2–2	(South Korea) Jeonbuk Hyundai Motors
Buhagiar 56'; Le Fondre 77' (pen.)	Live Report; Stats Report	Brattan 50' (o.g.); Han Kyo-won 89'

Jubilee Oval, Sydney
Attendance: 3,255
Referee: Ahmed Al-Kaf (Oman)

19 November 2020
13:00 UTC+3

Sydney FC (Australia)	1–2	(China) Shanghai SIPG
Buhagiar 8'	Live Report; Stats Report	Li Shenglong 63', 79'

Khalifa International Stadium, Al Rayyan
Attendance: 0
Referee: Abdulrahman Al-Jassim (Qatar)

22 November 2020
16:00 UTC+3

Jeonbuk Hyundai Motors (South Korea)	1–2	(China) Shanghai SIPG
Gustavo 24'	Live Report; Stats Report	Lü Wenjun 11'; Hulk 82' (pen.)

Khalifa International Stadium, Al Rayyan
Attendance: 0
Referee: Ammar Al-Jeneibi (United Arab Emirates)

25 November 2020
13:00 UTC+3

Jeonbuk Hyundai Motors (South Korea)	1–0	(Australia) Sydney FC
Na Seong-eun 44'	Live Report; Stats Report

Al Janoub Stadium, Al Wakrah
Attendance: 0
Referee: Hettikamkanamge Perera (Sri Lanka)
25 November 2020
16:00 UTC+3

Shanghai SIPG (China)	0–1	(Japan) Yokohama F. Marinos
	Live Report; Stats Report	Amano 90'

Al Janoub Stadium, Al Wakrah
Attendance: 0
Referee: Ali Sabah (Iraq)

28 November 2020
16:00 UTC+3

Yokohama F. Marinos (Japan)	1–2	(China) Shanghai SIPG
Onaiwu 21'	Live Report; Stats Report	Cai Huikang 14'; Lopes 55'

Al Janoub Stadium, Al Wakrah
Attendance: 0
Referee: Mohammed Abdulla Hassan Mohamed (United Arab Emirates)

1 December 2020
13:00 UTC+3

Yokohama F. Marinos (Japan)	4–1	(South Korea) Jeonbuk Hyundai Motors
Theerathon 17'; Júnior 51'; Nakagawa 71'; Song Bum-keun 83' (o.g.)	Live Report; Stats Report	Gustavo 54' (pen.)

Al Janoub Stadium, Al Wakrah
Attendance: 0
Referee: Nawaf Shukralla (Bahrain)
1 December 2020
16:00 UTC+3

Shanghai SIPG (China)	0–4	(Australia) Sydney FC
	Live Report; Stats Report	Wilkinson 28'; Brattan 33'; Buhagiar 57', 60'

Al Janoub Stadium, Al Wakrah
Attendance: 0
Referee: Turki Al-Khudhayr (Saudi Arabia)

4 December 2020
13:00 UTC+3

Shanghai SIPG (China)	0–2	(South Korea) Jeonbuk Hyundai Motors
	Live Report; Stats Report	Cho Gue-sung 16', 32' (pen.)

Khalifa International Stadium, Al Rayyan
Attendance: 0
Referee: Mooud Bonyadifar (Iran)
4 December 2020
13:00 UTC+3

Sydney FC (Australia)	1–1	(Japan) Yokohama F. Marinos
Buhagiar 29'	Live Report; Stats Report	Saneto 18'

Al Janoub Stadium, Al Wakrah
Attendance: 0
Referee: Saoud Al-Athbah (Qatar)
