= 2020 AFC Champions League knockout stage =

Football tournament knockout stage

The 2020 AFC Champions League knockout stage was played from 26 September to 19 December 2020 in Qatar. A total of 16 teams competed in the knockout stage to decide the champions of the 2020 AFC Champions League.

== Qualified teams ==
The winners and runners-up of each of the eight groups in the group stage advanced to the round of 16, with both West Region (Groups A–D) and East Region (Groups E–H) having eight qualified teams.

Region	Group	Winners	Runners-up
West Region	A	(Saudi Arabia) Al-Ahli	(Iran) Esteghlal
West Region	B	(Uzbekistan) Pakhtakor	(United Arab Emirates) Shabab Al-Ahli
West Region	C	(Iran) Persepolis	(Saudi Arabia) Al-Taawoun
West Region	D	(Saudi Arabia) Al-Nassr	(Qatar) Al-Sadd
East Region	E	(China) Beijing FC	(Australia) Melbourne Victory
East Region	F	(South Korea) Ulsan Hyundai	(Japan) FC Tokyo
East Region	G	(Japan) Vissel Kobe	(South Korea) Suwon Samsung Bluewings
East Region	H	(Japan) Yokohama F. Marinos	(China) Shanghai SIPG

== Format ==
In the knockout stage, the 16 teams played a single-elimination tournament, with the teams split into the two regions until the final. Each tie was played as a single-leg match at centralised venues, instead of the usual home-and-away two-legged basis as planned before the COVID-19 pandemic. Extra time and a penalty shoot-out were used to decide the winners if necessary.

== Schedule ==
The schedule of each round was as follows.

Round	West Region	East Region
Round of 16	26–27 September 2020	6–7 December 2020
Quarter-finals	30 September	10 December 2020
Semi-finals	3 October 2020	13 December 2020
Final	19 December 2020	

The original schedule, as planned before the COVID-19 pandemic, was as follows.

- Round of 16: 18–19 May (West Region first legs), 25–27 May (West Region second legs and East Region first legs), 16–17 June (East Region second legs)
- Quarter-finals: 24–26 August (first legs), 14–16 September (second legs)
- Semi-finals: 29–30 September (first legs), 20–21 October (second legs)
- Final: 22 November (first leg), 28 November (second leg)

After meetings with representatives of the member associations from the East Region held on 2 March 2020 and from the West Region held on 7–8 March 2020, it was agreed that the round of 16, quarter-finals and semi-finals would be moved to 10–12 and 24–26 August, 14–16 and 28–30 September, and 20–21 and 27–28 October.

On 9 July 2020, the AFC announced the new schedule for the remaining matches, with all matches before the final played at centralised venues. The West Region round of 16, quarter-finals and semi-finals would be played on 26–27 September, 30 September and 3 October, and the East Region round of 16, quarter-finals and semi-finals would be played on 3–4 November, 25 November and 28 November. The final would be played on 5 December, at a venue in the West Region. On 10 September 2020, the AFC announced that East Region round of 16, quarter-finals and semi-finals were rescheduled to be played on 6–7 December, 10 December and 13 December, and the final were rescheduled to 19 December.

== Venues ==
On 16 July 2020, the AFC announced that Qatar would host all West Region matches after restart. On 27 July 2020, the AFC announced that Malaysia would host two round of 16 matches involving teams from Group G and H, and both quarter-finals and the semi-final of the East Region. However, on 9 October 2020, the AFC announced that following an agreement with Qatar Football Association, all East Region matches after restart would also be played in Qatar. On 16 October 2020, the AFC announced that the final would be played in Qatar.

The following centralised venues in Qatar were used:

- Al Janoub Stadium, Al Wakrah (2 round of 16 matches of West Region, 2 quarter-finals and 1 semi-final of East Region, and final)
- Education City Stadium, Al Rayyan (2 round of 16 matches of West Region, 2 round of 16 matches of East Region)
- Jassim bin Hamad Stadium, Al Rayyan (2 quarter-finals and 1 semi-final of West Region)
- Khalifa International Stadium, Al Rayyan (2 round of 16 matches of East Region)

== Bracket ==
The bracket of the knockout stage was determined as follows:

Round	West Region	East Region
Round of 16	Winners of Group A vs. Runners-up of Group B; Winners of Group B vs. Runners-up of Group A; Winners of Group C vs. Runners-up of Group D; Winners of Group D vs. Runners-up of Group C	Winners of Group E vs. Runners-up of Group F; Winners of Group F vs. Runners-up of Group E; Winners of Group G vs. Runners-up of Group H; Winners of Group H vs. Runners-up of Group G
Quarter-finals	(Matchups decided by draw, involving four round of 16 winners): QF West 1; QF West 2	(Matchups decided by draw, involving four round of 16 winners): QF East 1; QF East 2
Semi-finals	SF West: Winners of QF West 1 vs. Winners of QF West 2	SF East: Winners of QF East 1 vs. Winners of QF East 2
Final	Winners of SF West vs. Winners of SF East	

The bracket was decided after the draw for the quarter-finals. The draw for the West Region quarter-finals was held on 28 September 2020, 11:00 AST (UTC+3), and the draw for the East Region quarter-finals was held on 8 December 2020, 11:30 AST (UTC+3), both in Doha, Qatar.

Round of 16
27 September – Al Rayyan (ECS)
(Saudi Arabia) Al-Nassr	1
(Saudi Arabia) Al-Taawoun	0
26 September – Al Wakrah
(Saudi Arabia) Al-Ahli (p)	1 (4)
(United Arab Emirates) Shabab Al-Ahli	1 (3)
27 September – Al Rayyan (ECS)
(Iran) Persepolis	1
(Qatar) Al-Sadd	0
26 September – Al Wakrah
(Uzbekistan) Pakhtakor	2
(Iran) Esteghlal	1
6 December – Al Rayyan (ECS)
(South Korea) Ulsan Hyundai	3
(Australia) Melbourne Victory	0
6 December – Al Rayyan (ECS)
(China) Beijing FC	1
(Japan) FC Tokyo	0
7 December – Al Rayyan (KIS)
(Japan) Vissel Kobe	2
(China) Shanghai SIPG	0
7 December – Al Rayyan (KIS)
(Japan) Yokohama F. Marinos	2
(South Korea) Suwon Samsung Bluewings	3

Quarter-finals
30 September – Al Rayyan (JBHS)
(Saudi Arabia) Al-Nassr	2
(Saudi Arabia) Al-Ahli	0
30 September – Al Rayyan (JBHS)
(Iran) Persepolis	2
(Uzbekistan) Pakhtakor	0
10 December – Al Wakrah
(South Korea) Ulsan Hyundai	2
(China) Beijing FC	0
10 December – Al Wakrah
(Japan) Vissel Kobe (p)	1 (7)
(South Korea) Suwon Samsung Bluewings	1 (6)

Semi-finals
3 October – Al Rayyan (JBHS)
(Saudi Arabia) Al-Nassr	1 (3)
(Iran) Persepolis (p)	1 (5)
13 December – Al Rayyan (JBHS)
(South Korea) Ulsan Hyundai (a.e.t.)	2
(Japan) Vissel Kobe	1

Final
19 December – Al Wakrah
(Iran) Persepolis	1
(South Korea) Ulsan Hyundai	2

== Round of 16 ==
=== Summary ===
In the round of 16, the winners of one group played against the runners-up of another group from the same region and the matchups were determined by the group stage draw.

West Region
Team 1	Score	Team 2
Al-Ahli (Saudi Arabia)	1–1 (a.e.t.) (4–3 p)	(United Arab Emirates) Shabab Al-Ahli
Pakhtakor (Uzbekistan)	2–1	(Iran) Esteghlal
Persepolis (Iran)	1–0	(Qatar) Al-Sadd
Al-Nassr (Saudi Arabia)	1–0	(Saudi Arabia) Al-Taawoun

East Region
Team 1	Score	Team 2
Beijing FC (China)	1–0	(Japan) FC Tokyo
Ulsan Hyundai (South Korea)	3–0	(Australia) Melbourne Victory
Vissel Kobe (Japan)	2–0	(China) Shanghai SIPG
Yokohama F. Marinos (Japan)	2–3	(South Korea) Suwon Samsung Bluewings

=== West Region ===
26 September 2020
16:40 UTC+3

Al-Ahli (Saudi Arabia)	1–1 (a.e.t.)	(United Arab Emirates) Shabab Al-Ahli
Al Somah 54' (pen.)	Live Report; Stats Report	Ganiev 28'
Penalties
Abdulghani (penalty scored); Lima (penalty scored); Ghareeb (penalty scored); Hawsawi (penalty scored); Al Somah (penalty missed)	4–3	(penalty missed) Khalil; (penalty scored) Jaber; (penalty scored) Ganiev; (penalty scored) Al-Bloushi; (penalty missed) Al-Naqbi

Al Janoub Stadium, Al Wakrah
Attendance: 10
Referee: Nawaf Shukralla (Bahrain)

26 September 2020
20:45 UTC+3

Pakhtakor (Uzbekistan)	2–1	(Iran) Esteghlal
Ćeran 43'; Derdiyok 47'	Live Report; Stats Report	Karimi 32'

Al Janoub Stadium, Al Wakrah
Attendance: 0
Referee: Ahmed Al-Kaf (Oman)

27 September 2020
16:40 UTC+3

Persepolis (Iran)	1–0	(Qatar) Al-Sadd
Alekasir 88'	Live Report; Stats Report

Education City Stadium, Al Rayyan
Attendance: 0
Referee: Ko Hyung-jin (South Korea)

27 September 2020
20:45 UTC+3

Al-Nassr (Saudi Arabia)	1–0	(Saudi Arabia) Al-Taawoun
Hamdallah 75'	Live Report; Stats Report

Education City Stadium, Al Rayyan
Attendance: 0
Referee: Ali Sabah (Iraq)

=== East Region ===
6 December 2020
13:00 UTC+3

Beijing FC (China)	1–0	(Japan) FC Tokyo
Alan 59'	Live Report; Stats Report

Education City Stadium, Al Rayyan
Attendance: 0
Referee: Alireza Faghani (Iran)

6 December 2020
17:00 UTC+3

Ulsan Hyundai (South Korea)	3–0	(Australia) Melbourne Victory
Johnsen 65', 86'; Won Du-jae 77'	Live Report; Stats Report

Education City Stadium, Al Rayyan
Attendance: 0
Referee: Turki Al-Khudhayr (Saudi Arabia)

7 December 2020
13:00 UTC+3

Vissel Kobe (Japan)	2–0	(China) Shanghai SIPG
Iniesta 31'; Nishi 50'	Live Report; Stats Report

Khalifa International Stadium, Al Rayyan
Attendance: 0
Referee: Chris Beath (Australia)

7 December 2020
17:00 UTC+3

Yokohama F. Marinos (Japan)	2–3	(South Korea) Suwon Samsung Bluewings
Erik 20'; Onaiwu 90+1'	Live Report; Stats Report	Kim Tae-hwan 57'; Kim Min-woo 82'; Han Seok-jong 87'

Khalifa International Stadium, Al Rayyan
Attendance: 0
Referee: Hettikamkanamge Perera (Sri Lanka)

== Quarter-finals ==
=== Summary ===
In the quarter-finals, the four teams from the West Region played in two ties, and the four teams from the East Region played in two ties, with the matchups decided by draw, without any seeding or country protection. The draw for the West Region quarter-finals was held on 28 September 2020, and the draw for the East Region quarter-finals was held on 8 December 2020.

West Region
Team 1	Score	Team 2
Al-Nassr (Saudi Arabia)	2–0	(Saudi Arabia) Al-Ahli
Persepolis (Iran)	2–0	(Uzbekistan) Pakhtakor

East Region
Team 1	Score	Team 2
Ulsan Hyundai (South Korea)	2–0	(China) Beijing FC
Vissel Kobe (Japan)	1–1 (a.e.t.) (7–6 p)	(South Korea) Suwon Samsung Bluewings

=== West Region ===
30 September 2020
16:40 UTC+3

Al-Nassr (Saudi Arabia)	2–0	(Saudi Arabia) Al-Ahli
Martínez 13'; Asiri 55'	Live Report; Stats Report

Jassim bin Hamad Stadium, Al Rayyan
Attendance: 0
Referee: Sivakorn Pu-udom (Thailand)

30 September 2020
20:45 UTC+3

Persepolis (Iran)	2–0	(Uzbekistan) Pakhtakor
Alekasir 49', 66'	Live Report; Stats Report

Jassim bin Hamad Stadium, Al Rayyan
Attendance: 0
Referee: Adham Makhadmeh (Jordan)

=== East Region ===
10 December 2020
13:00 UTC+3

Ulsan Hyundai (South Korea)	2–0	(China) Beijing FC
Júnior 21' (pen.), 42'	Live Report; Stats Report

Al Janoub Stadium, Al Wakrah
Attendance: 0
Referee: Mohammed Abdulla Hassan Mohamed (United Arab Emirates)

10 December 2020
17:00 UTC+3

Vissel Kobe (Japan)	1–1 (a.e.t.)	(South Korea) Suwon Samsung Bluewings
Furuhashi 40'	Live Report; Stats Report	Park Sang-hyeok 7'
Penalties
Iniesta (penalty scored); Douglas (penalty scored); Hatsuse (penalty scored); Furuhashi (penalty scored); Yamaguchi (penalty scored); Yamakawa (penalty scored); Fujimoto (penalty scored)	7–6	(penalty scored) Kim Gun-hee; (penalty scored) Lee Ki-je; (penalty scored) Kim Min-woo; (penalty scored) Ko Seung-beom; (penalty scored) Han Seok-jong; (penalty scored) Min Sang-gi; (penalty missed) Jang Ho-ik

Al Janoub Stadium, Al Wakrah
Attendance: 0
Referee: Adham Makhadmeh (Jordan)

== Semi-finals ==
=== Summary ===
In the semi-finals, the two quarter-final winners from the West Region played against each other, and the two quarter-final winners from the East Region played against each other.

West Region
Team 1	Score	Team 2
Al-Nassr (Saudi Arabia)	1–1 (a.e.t.) (3–5 p)	(Iran) Persepolis

East Region
Team 1	Score	Team 2
Ulsan Hyundai (South Korea)	2–1 (a.e.t.)	(Japan) Vissel Kobe

=== West Region ===
3 October 2020
18:00 UTC+3

Al-Nassr (Saudi Arabia)	1–1 (a.e.t.)	(Iran) Persepolis
Hamdallah 36' (pen.)	Live Report; Stats Report	Abdi 42'
Penalties
Madu (penalty scored); Martínez (penalty scored); Al-Obaid (penalty scored); Maicon (penalty missed)	3–5	(penalty scored) Kanaanizadegan; (penalty scored) Nemati; (penalty scored) Sarlak; (penalty scored) Khalilzadeh; (penalty scored) Shojaei

Jassim bin Hamad Stadium, Al Rayyan
Attendance: 0
Referee: Muhammad Taqi (Singapore)

=== East Region ===
13 December 2020
13:00 UTC+3

Ulsan Hyundai (South Korea)	2–1 (a.e.t.)	(Japan) Vissel Kobe
Johnsen 81'; Júnior 119' (pen.)	Live Report; Stats Report	Yamaguchi 52'

Jassim bin Hamad Stadium, Al Rayyan (Note: The semi-final of the East Region was originally scheduled to be played at Al Janoub Stadium, Al Wakrah, but was moved to Jassim bin Hamad Stadium, Al Rayyan, to ensure optimum pitch conditions for the semi-final and the final.)
Attendance: 0
Referee: Nawaf Shukralla (Bahrain)

== Final ==
In the final, the two semi-final winners played against each other, at Al Janoub Stadium in Al Wakrah, Qatar.

19 December 2020
15:00 UTC+3

Persepolis (Iran)	1–2	(South Korea) Ulsan Hyundai
Abdi 45'	Live Report; Stats Report	Júnior 45+4', 55' (pen.)

Al Janoub Stadium, Al Wakrah
Attendance: 8,517
Referee: Abdulrahman Al-Jassim (Qatar)
