= 2020 AFC Champions League =

39th edition of premier club football tournament organized by the AFC

- The Al Janoub Stadium in Al Wakrah hosted the final

Tournament details
- Dates: Qualifying: 14–28 January 2020; Competition proper: 10 February – 19 December 2020
- Teams: Competition proper: 29 teams (from 23 associations)

Final positions
- Champions: (South Korea) Ulsan Hyundai (2nd title)
- Runners-up: (Iran) Persepolis

Tournament statistics
- Matches played: 93
- Goals scored: 236 (2.54 per match)
- Attendance: 182,388 (1,961 per match)
- Top scorer(s): Abderrazak Hamdallah; Júnior Negrão (7 goals each)
- Best player: Yoon Bit-garam
- Fair play award: (South Korea) Ulsan Hyundai
- (Note: All statistics do not include qualifying play-offs and matches voided by AFC)

The 2020 AFC Champions League was the 39th edition of Asia's premier club football tournament organized by the Asian Football Confederation (AFC), and the 18th under the current AFC Champions League title.

Ulsan Hyundai won their second Champions League title by defeating Persepolis 2–1 in the final. Ulsan automatically qualify for the 2021 AFC Champions League (although they had already qualified through their domestic performance), the first time since 2008 that the AFC Champions League holders were guaranteed automatic qualification in the following year. They also earned the right to play in the 2020 FIFA Club World Cup in Qatar.

The tournament was the last to involve 32 teams during the group stage, which increased to 40 teams in 2021.

The competition was suspended due to the COVID-19 pandemic in Asia after group stage matches on 4 March 2020, and restarted on 14 September 2020. All matches after the restart were played in Qatar, with the final played at the Al Janoub Stadium in the city of Al Wakrah.

Al-Hilal of Saudi Arabia were the defending champions, but the club effectively withdrew from the competition when they could not name the required 13 players for their final group stage match, as all but 11 players had tested positive for COVID-19. For the first time, the video assistant referee (VAR) system was in use from the quarter-finals onwards.

== Association team allocation ==
The 46 AFC member associations (excluding the associate member Northern Mariana Islands) were ranked based on their national team's and clubs' performance over the last four years in AFC competitions, with the allocation of slots for the 2019 and 2020 editions of the AFC club competitions determined by the 2017 AFC rankings (Entry Manual Article 2.3):

- The associations were split into two regions:
  - West Region consisted of the associations from the West Asian Football Federation (WAFF), the Central Asian Football Association (CAFA), and the South Asian Football Federation (SAFF).
  - East Region consisted of the associations from the ASEAN Football Federation (AFF) and the East Asian Football Federation (EAFF).
- In each region, there were four groups in the group stage, including a total of 12 direct slots, with the 4 remaining slots filled through play-offs.
- The top 12 associations in each region as per the AFC rankings were eligible to enter the AFC Champions League, as long as they fulfilled the AFC Champions League criteria.
- The top six associations in each region got at least one direct slot in the group stage, while the remaining associations got only play-off slots (as well as AFC Cup group stage slots):
  - The associations ranked 1st and 2nd each got three direct slots and one play-off slot.
  - The associations ranked 3rd and 4th each got two direct slots and two play-off slots.
  - The associations ranked 5th each got one direct slot and two play-off slots.
  - The associations ranked 6th each got one direct slot and one play-off slot.
  - The associations ranked 7th to 12th each got one play-off slot.
- The maximum number of slots for each association was one-third of the total number of eligible teams in the top division.
- If any association gave up its direct slots, they were redistributed to the highest eligible association, with each association limited to a maximum of three direct slots.
- If any association gave up its play-off slots, they were annulled and not redistributed to any other association.

=== Association ranking ===
For the 2020 AFC Champions League, the associations were allocated slots according to their association ranking which was published on 15 December 2017, which took into account their performance in the AFC Champions League and the AFC Cup, as well as their national team's FIFA World Rankings, during the period between 2014 and 2017.

Participation for 2020 AFC Champions League
Participating
Not participating

West Region (4 groups)
Rank		Member Association	Points	Slots			
Rank		Member Association	Points	Group stage	Play-off		
Region	AFC	Member Association	Points	Group stage	Play-off round	Prelim. round 2	Prelim. round 1
1	1	United Arab Emirates	95.940	3	1	0	0
2	4	Saudi Arabia	84.269	3	1	0	0
3	6	Qatar	82.407	2	2	0	0
4	7	Iran	71.851	2	0	2	0
5	9	Uzbekistan	43.305	1	0	2	0
6	11	Iraq	42.141	1	0	1	0
7	12	Tajikistan	30.725	0	0	1	0
8	15	India	29.291	0	0	0	1
9	16	Syria	28.983	0	0	0	0
10	18	Jordan	25.649	0	0	0	1
11	19	Kuwait	24.798	0	0	0	1
12	20	Bahrain	24.337	0	0	0	1
Total		Participating associations: 11		12	4	6	4
Total		Participating associations: 11		12	14		
Total		Participating associations: 11		26			

East Region (4 groups)
Rank		Member Association	Points	Slots			
Rank		Member Association	Points	Group stage	Play-off		
Region	AFC	Member Association	Points	Group stage	Play-off round	Prelim. round 2	Prelim. round 1
1	2	South Korea	87.480	3	1	0	0
2	3	China	86.671	3	1	0	0
3	5	Japan	83.464	2	2	0	0
4	8	Australia	64.752	2	0	1	0
5	10	Thailand	42.568	1	0	2	0
6	13	Malaysia	29.566	1	0	1	0
7	14	Hong Kong	29.300	0	0	1	0
8	17	Vietnam	27.426	0	0	1	0
9	21	Philippines	21.405	0	0	0	1
10	23	Singapore	17.084	0	0	0	1
11	24	Indonesia	16.871	0	0	0	1
12	25	Myanmar	14.753	0	0	0	1
Total		Participating associations: 12		12	4	6	4
Total		Participating associations: 12		12	14		
Total		Participating associations: 12		26			

Notes

1. Australia (AUS): The top division run by the Football Federation Australia, the A-League, only had nine Australia-based teams in the 2018–19 season, so Australia could only get a maximum of three total slots (Entry Manual 5.4).
2. Syria (SYR): Syria did not have any teams which had an AFC Champions League license.

== Teams ==
The following 52 teams from 23 associations entered the competition.

In the following table, the number of appearances and last appearance count only those since the 2002–03 season (including qualifying rounds), when the competition was rebranded as the AFC Champions League.

West RegionGroup stage direct entrants (Groups A–D)
Team	Qualifying method	App (Last)
(United Arab Emirates) Sharjah	2018–19 UAE Pro League champions	2nd (2004)
(United Arab Emirates) Shabab Al-Ahli	2018–19 UAE President's Cup winners 2018–19 UAE Pro League runners-up	1st
(United Arab Emirates) Al-Wahda	2018–19 UAE Pro League 3rd place	11th (2019)
(Saudi Arabia) Al-Nassr	2018–19 Saudi Professional League champions	5th (2019)
(Saudi Arabia) Al-Taawoun	2019 King Cup winners 2018–19 Saudi Professional League 3rd place	2nd (2017)
(Saudi Arabia) Al-Hilal	2018–19 Saudi Professional League runners-up	16th (2019)
(Qatar) Al-Sadd	2018–19 Qatar Stars League champions	15th (2019)
(Qatar) Al-Duhail	2019 Emir of Qatar Cup winners 2018–19 Qatar Stars League runners-up	9th (2019)
(Iran) Persepolis	2018–19 Persian Gulf Pro League champions and 2018–19 Hazfi Cup winners and 2019 Iranian Super Cup winners	9th (2019)
(Iran) Sepahan	2018–19 Persian Gulf Pro League runners-up	12th (2016)
(Uzbekistan) Pakhtakor	2019 Uzbekistan Super League champions and 2019 Uzbekistan Cup winners	16th (2019)
(Iraq) Al-Shorta	2018–19 Iraqi Premier League champions	4th (2014)

Qualifying play-off participants: Entering in play-off round
Team	Qualifying method	App (Last)
(United Arab Emirates) Al-Ain	2018–19 UAE Pro League 4th place	15th (2019)
(Saudi Arabia) Al-Ahli	2018–19 Saudi Professional League 4th place	12th (2019)
(Qatar) Al-Sailiya	2018–19 Qatar Stars League 3rd place	1st
(Qatar) Al-Rayyan	2018–19 Qatar Stars League 4th place	10th (2019)

Qualifying play-off participants: Entering in preliminary round 2
Team	Qualifying method	App (Last)
(Iran) Esteghlal	2018–19 Persian Gulf Pro League 3rd place	11th (2019)
(Iran) Shahr Khodro	2018–19 Persian Gulf Pro League 4th place	1st
(Uzbekistan) Lokomotiv Tashkent	2019 Uzbekistan Super League runners-up	8th (2019)
(Uzbekistan) Bunyodkor	2019 Uzbekistan Super League 3rd place	11th (2017)
(Iraq) Al-Zawraa	2018–19 Iraq FA Cup winners	5th (2019)
(Tajikistan) Istiklol	2019 Tajikistan Higher League champions	2nd (2019)

Qualifying play-off participants: Entering in preliminary round 1
Team	Qualifying method	App (Last)
(India) Chennai City	2018–19 I-League champions	1st
(Jordan) Al-Faisaly	2018–19 Jordanian Pro League champions	3rd (2018)
Al-Kuwait	2018–19 Kuwaiti Premier League champions	7th (2019)
(Bahrain) Al-Riffa	2018–19 Bahraini Premier League champions	2nd (2015)

East RegionGroup stage direct entrants (Groups E–H)
Team	Qualifying method	App (Last)
(South Korea) Jeonbuk Hyundai Motors	2019 K League 1 champions	13th (2019)
(South Korea) Suwon Samsung Bluewings	2019 Korean FA Cup winners	10th (2018)
(South Korea) Ulsan Hyundai	2019 K League 1 runners-up	8th (2019)
(China) Guangzhou Evergrande	2019 Chinese Super League champions	9th (2019)
(China) Shanghai Shenhua	2019 Chinese FA Cup winners	9th (2018)
(China) Beijing FC	2019 Chinese Super League runners-up	9th (2019)
(Japan) Yokohama F. Marinos	2019 J1 League champions	4th (2014)
(Japan) Vissel Kobe	2019 Emperor's Cup winners	1st
(Australia) Perth Glory	2018–19 A-League premiers	1st
(Australia) Sydney FC	2019 A-League Grand Final winners 2018–19 A-League regular season runners-up	6th (2019)
(Thailand) Chiangrai United	2019 Thai League 1 champions	3rd (2019)
(Malaysia) Johor Darul Ta'zim	2019 Malaysia Super League champions	6th (2019)

Qualifying play-off participants: Entering in play-off round
Team	Qualifying method	App (Last)
(South Korea) FC Seoul	2019 K League 1 3rd place	8th (2017)
(China) Shanghai SIPG	2019 Chinese Super League 3rd place	5th (2019)
(Japan) FC Tokyo	2019 J1 League runners-up	3rd (2016)
(Japan) Kashima Antlers	2019 J1 League 3rd place	10th (2019)

Qualifying play-off participants: Entering in preliminary round 2
Team	Qualifying method	App (Last)
(Australia) Melbourne Victory	2018–19 A-League regular season 3rd place	8th (2019)
(Thailand) Port	2019 Thai FA Cup winners	1st
(Thailand) Buriram United	2019 Thai League 1 runners-up	9th (2019)
(Malaysia) Kedah	2019 Malaysia FA Cup winners	1st
(Hong Kong) Tai Po	2018–19 Hong Kong Premier League champions	1st
(Vietnam) Ho Chi Minh City	2019 V.League 1 runners-up	2nd (2002–03)

Qualifying play-off participants: Entering in preliminary round 1
Team	Qualifying method	App (Last)
(Philippines) Ceres–Negros	2019 Philippines Football League champions	3rd (2019)
(Singapore) Tampines Rovers	2019 Singapore Premier League runners-up	5th (2018)
(Indonesia) Bali United	2019 Liga 1 champions	2nd (2018)
(Myanmar) Shan United	2019 Myanmar National League champions	2nd (2018)

Notes

1. Title holders (TH): Al-Hilal were the title holders.
2. Singapore (SIN): DPMM, the 2019 Singapore Premier League champions, were a team from Brunei and thus ineligible to represent Singapore in AFC club competitions. As a result, Tampines Rovers, the league runners-up, entered the qualifying play-offs.
3. Vietnam (VIE): Hà Nội, the 2019 V.League 1 champions, failed to obtain an AFC license as their U15 team did not participate in Vietnam National U-15 Youth League. As a result, Ho Chi Minh City, the league runners-up, entered the qualifying play-offs.
Location of teams of the 2020 AFC Champions League group stage.
Brown: Group A; Red: Group B; Orange: Group C; Yellow: Group D;
Green: Group E; Blue: Group F; Purple: Group G; Pink: Group H; Qualifying play-offs

== Schedule ==
The schedule of the competition was as follows. Due to the COVID-19 pandemic, only some of the group stage matches on matchdays 1–3 in February and March were played as scheduled, and all matches on matchdays 4–6 were postponed until further notice. The round of 16, quarter-finals and semi-finals were also initially moved to 10–12 and 24–26 August, 14–16 and 28–30 September, and 20–21 and 27–28 October.

The AFC announced the calendar of the remaining matches on 9 July 2020, with all matches before the final played at centralised venues, and all knockout ties played as a single match. On 10 September 2020, the AFC announced the new dates for the East Region matches and the final.

Notes:

- W: West Region
- E: East Region
- Italics: new dates after restart

Stage	Round	Draw date	Match dates
Preliminary stage	Preliminary round 1	No draw	14 January 2020
Preliminary stage	Preliminary round 2	No draw	21 January 2020
Play-off stage	Play-off round	No draw	28 January 2020
Group stage	Matchday 1	10 December 2019	10–12 February 2020, 18–19 November 2020 (E)
Group stage	Matchday 2	10 December 2019	17–19 February 2020, 21–22 November 2020 (E)
Group stage	Matchday 3	10 December 2019	3–4 March 2020 (E), 14–15 September 2020 (W), 24–25 November 2020 (E)
Group stage	Matchday 4	10 December 2019	17–18 September 2020 (W), 27–28 November 2020 (E)
Group stage	Matchday 5	10 December 2019	20–21 September 2020 (W), 30 November – 1 December 2020 (E)
Group stage	Matchday 6	10 December 2019	23–24 September 2020 (W), 3–4 December 2020 (E)
Knockout stage	Round of 16	10 December 2019	26–27 September 2020 (W), 6–7 December 2020 (E)
Knockout stage	Quarter-finals	28 September 2020 (W); 8 December 2020 (E)	30 September 2020 (W), 10 December 2020 (E)
Knockout stage	Semi-finals	28 September 2020 (W); 8 December 2020 (E)	3 October 2020 (W), 13 December 2020 (E)
Knockout stage	Final	28 September 2020 (W); 8 December 2020 (E)	19 December 2020 at Al Janoub Stadium, Al Wakrah

The original schedule of the competition, as planned before the pandemic, was as follows.

Original schedule for 2020 AFC Champions League
Stage	Round	Draw date	First leg	Second leg
Preliminary stage	Preliminary round 1	No draw	14 January 2020	
Preliminary stage	Preliminary round 2	No draw	21 January 2020	
Play-off stage	Play-off round	No draw	28 January 2020	
Group stage	Matchday 1	10 December 2019	10–12 February 2020	
Group stage	Matchday 2	10 December 2019	17–19 February 2020	
Group stage	Matchday 3	10 December 2019	2–4 March 2020	
Group stage	Matchday 4	10 December 2019	6–8 April 2020	
Group stage	Matchday 5	10 December 2019	20–22 April 2020	
Group stage	Matchday 6	10 December 2019	4–6 May 2020	
Knockout stage	Round of 16	10 December 2019	18–19 May 2020 (W), 26–27 May 2019 (E)	25–26 May 2020 (W), 16–17 June 2020 (E)
Knockout stage	Quarter-finals	TBD	24–26 August 2020	14–16 September 2020
Knockout stage	Semi-finals	TBD	29–30 September 2020	20–21 October 2020
Knockout stage	Final	TBD	22 November 2020	28 November 2020

== Qualifying play-offs ==
In the qualifying play-offs, each tie was played as a single match. Extra time and a penalty shoot-out were used to decide the winner if necessary (Regulations Article 9.2). The bracket of the qualifying play-offs for each region was determined based on the association ranking of each team, with the team from the higher-ranked association hosting the match. Teams from the same association could not be placed into the same tie. The eight winners of the play-off round (four each from both West Region and East Region) advanced to the group stage to join the 24 direct entrants. All losers in each round from associations with only play-off slots entered the AFC Cup group stage.

=== Preliminary round 1 ===
West Region
Team 1	Score	Team 2
Chennai City (India)	0–1	(Bahrain) Al-Riffa
Al-Faisaly (Jordan)	1–2 (a.e.t.)	Al-Kuwait

East Region
Team 1	Score	Team 2
Ceres–Negros (Philippines)	3–2	(Myanmar) Shan United
Tampines Rovers (Singapore)	3–5 (a.e.t.)	(Indonesia) Bali United

=== Preliminary round 2 ===
West Region
Team 1	Score	Team 2
Bunyodkor (Uzbekistan)	4–1	(Iraq) Al-Zawraa
Lokomotiv Tashkent (Uzbekistan)	0–1	(Tajikistan) Istiklol
Shahr Khodro (Iran)	2–1	(Bahrain) Al-Riffa
Esteghlal (Iran)	3–0	Al-Kuwait

East Region
Team 1	Score	Team 2
Kedah (Malaysia)	5–1	(Hong Kong) Tai Po
Buriram United (Thailand)	2–1	(Vietnam) Ho Chi Minh City
Port (Thailand)	0–1	(Philippines) Ceres–Negros
Melbourne Victory (Australia)	5–0	(Indonesia) Bali United

=== Play-off round ===
West Region
Team 1	Score	Team 2
Al-Ain (United Arab Emirates)	1–0	(Uzbekistan) Bunyodkor
Al-Ahli (Saudi Arabia)	1–0	(Tajikistan) Istiklol
Al-Sailiya (Qatar)	0–0 (a.e.t.) (4–5 p)	(Iran) Shahr Khodro
Al-Rayyan (Qatar)	0–5	(Iran) Esteghlal

East Region
Team 1	Score	Team 2
FC Seoul (South Korea)	4–1	(Malaysia) Kedah
Shanghai SIPG (China)	3–0	(Thailand) Buriram United
FC Tokyo (Japan)	2–0	(Philippines) Ceres–Negros
Kashima Antlers (Japan)	0–1	(Australia) Melbourne Victory

== Group stage ==
The draw for the group stage was held on 10 December 2019, 16:30 MYT (UTC+8), at the AFC House in Kuala Lumpur, Malaysia. The 32 teams were drawn into eight groups of four: four groups each in the West Region (Groups A–D) and the East Region (Groups E–H). Teams from the same association could not be drawn into the same group. In the group stage, each group was played on a double round-robin basis, with matches played home-and-away before the suspension due to the COVID-19 pandemic, but moved to centralised venues after restart. The winners and runners-up of each group advanced to the round of 16 of the knockout stage.

Tiebreakers

The teams were ranked according to points (3 points for a win, 1 point for a draw, 0 points for a loss). If tied on points, tiebreakers were applied in the following order (Regulations Article 10.5):

1. Points in head-to-head matches among tied teams;
2. Goal difference in head-to-head matches among tied teams;
3. Goals scored in head-to-head matches among tied teams;
4. ~~Away goals scored in head-to-head matches among tied teams;~~ (this tiebreaker was removed since the matches were played in centralised venues after restart)
5. If more than two teams were tied, and after applying all head-to-head criteria above, a subset of teams were still tied, all head-to-head criteria above were reapplied exclusively to this subset of teams;
6. Goal difference in all group matches;
7. Goals scored in all group matches;
8. Penalty shoot-out if only two teams playing each other in the last round of the group were tied;
9. Disciplinary points (yellow card = 1 point, red card as a result of two yellow cards = 3 points, direct red card = 3 points, yellow card followed by direct red card = 4 points);
10. Association ranking.

=== Group A ===
Pos	Team	Pld	W	D	L	GF	GA	GD	Pts	Qualification	AHL	EST	SHO	WAH
1	(Saudi Arabia) Al-Ahli	4	2	0	2	4	6	−2	6	Advance to knockout stage	—	2–1	1–0	~~20 Sep~~
2	(Iran) Esteghlal	4	1	2	1	6	4	+2	5	Advance to knockout stage	3–0	—	1–1	~~17 Sep~~
3	(Iraq) Al-Shorta	4	1	2	1	4	4	0	5		2–1	1–1	—	~~0–1~~
4	(United Arab Emirates) Al-Wahda	0	0	0	0	0	0	0	0	Withdrew, results expunged (Note: Al-Wahda were unable to travel to Qatar to play the final four matches of the group stage due to several team members having tested positive for COVID-19. They were considered to have withdrawn from the competition, and their results were expunged.)	~~1–1~~	~~14 Sep~~	~~23 Sep~~	—

Source: AFC

=== Group B ===
Pos	Team	Pld	W	D	L	GF	GA	GD	Pts	Qualification	PAK	SAH	SHK	HIL
1	(Uzbekistan) Pakhtakor	4	3	1	0	6	1	+5	10	Advance to knockout stage	—	2–1	3–0	~~0–0~~
2	(United Arab Emirates) Shabab Al-Ahli	4	2	1	1	3	2	+1	7	Advance to knockout stage	0–0	—	1–0	~~1–2~~
3	(Iran) Shahr Khodro	4	0	0	4	0	6	−6	0		0–1	0–1	—	~~0–0~~
4	(Saudi Arabia) Al-Hilal	0	0	0	0	0	0	0	0	Withdrew, results expunged (Note: Al-Hilal were unable to play their final match of the group stage against Shabab Al-Ahli due to having only 11 fit players after various team members tested positive for COVID-19. They were considered to have withdrawn from the competition, and their results were expunged.)	~~2–1~~	~~23 Sep~~	~~2–0~~	—

Source: AFC

=== Group C ===
Pos	Team	Pld	W	D	L	GF	GA	GD	Pts	Qualification	PRS	TAW	DUH	SHJ
1	(Iran) Persepolis	6	3	1	2	8	5	+3	10	Advance to knockout stage	—	1–0	0–1	4–0
2	(Saudi Arabia) Al-Taawoun	6	3	0	3	4	8	−4	9 (Note: Head-to-head points: Al-Taawoun 6, Al-Duhail 0.)	Advance to knockout stage	0–1	—	2–0	0–6
3	(Qatar) Al-Duhail	6	3	0	3	7	8	−1	9		2–0	0–1	—	2–1
4	(United Arab Emirates) Sharjah	6	2	1	3	13	11	+2	7		2–2	0–1	4–2	—

Source: AFC

=== Group D ===
Pos	Team	Pld	W	D	L	GF	GA	GD	Pts	Qualification	NAS	SAD	SEP	AIN
1	(Saudi Arabia) Al-Nassr	6	3	2	1	9	5	+4	11	Advance to knockout stage	—	2–2	2–0	0–1
2	(Qatar) Al-Sadd	6	2	3	1	14	8	+6	9	Advance to knockout stage	1–1	—	3–0	4–0
3	(Iran) Sepahan	6	2	1	3	6	8	−2	7		0–2	2–1	—	0–0
4	(United Arab Emirates) Al-Ain	6	1	2	3	5	13	−8	5		1–2	3–3	0–4	—

Source: AFC

=== Group E ===
Pos	Team	Pld	W	D	L	GF	GA	GD	Pts	Qualification	BEI	MVC	SEO	CHI
1	(China) Beijing Guoan	6	5	1	0	12	4	+8	16	Advance to knockout stage	—	3–1	3–1	1–1
2	(Australia) Melbourne Victory	6	2	1	3	6	9	−3	7	Advance to knockout stage	0–2	—	2–1	1–0
3	(South Korea) FC Seoul	6	2	0	4	10	9	+1	6		1–2	1–0	—	5–0
4	(Thailand) Chiangrai United	6	1	2	3	5	11	−6	5		0–1	2–2	2–1	—

Source: AFC

=== Group F ===
Pos	Team	Pld	W	D	L	GF	GA	GD	Pts	Qualification	ULS	TOK	SSH	PRG
1	(South Korea) Ulsan Hyundai	6	5	1	0	14	5	+9	16	Advance to knockout stage	—	1–1	3–1	2–0
2	(Japan) FC Tokyo	6	3	1	2	6	5	+1	10	Advance to knockout stage	1–2	—	0–1	1–0
3	(China) Shanghai Shenhua	6	2	1	3	9	13	−4	7		1–4	1–2	—	3–3
4	(Australia) Perth Glory	6	0	1	5	5	11	−6	1		1–2	0–1	1–2	—

Source: AFC

=== Group G ===
Pos	Team	Pld	W	D	L	GF	GA	GD	Pts	Qualification	VIS	SUW	GZE	JDT
1	(Japan) Vissel Kobe	4	2	0	2	4	5	−1	6	Advance to knockout stage	—	0–2	0–2	~~5–1~~
2	(South Korea) Suwon Samsung Bluewings	4	1	2	1	3	2	+1	5	Advance to knockout stage	0–1	—	0–0	~~25 Nov~~
3	(China) Guangzhou Evergrande	4	1	2	1	4	4	0	5		1–3	1–1	—	~~4 Dec~~
4	(Malaysia) Johor Darul Ta'zim	0	0	0	0	0	0	0	0	Withdrew, results expunged (Note: Johor Darul Ta'zim were unable to travel to Qatar to play the final four matches of the group stage after their application for permission to travel was refused by the Malaysian government due to COVID-19 pandemic travel restrictions. They were considered to have withdrawn from the competition, and their results were expunged.)	~~1 Dec~~	~~2–1~~	~~19 Nov~~	—

Source: AFC

=== Group H ===
Pos	Team	Pld	W	D	L	GF	GA	GD	Pts	Qualification	YOK	SSI	JEO	SYD
1	(Japan) Yokohama F. Marinos	6	4	1	1	13	5	+8	13	Advance to knockout stage	—	1–2	4–1	4–0
2	(China) Shanghai SIPG	6	3	0	3	6	10	−4	9	Advance to knockout stage	0–1	—	0–2	0–4
3	(South Korea) Jeonbuk Hyundai Motors	6	2	1	3	8	10	−2	7		1–2	1–2	—	1–0
4	(Australia) Sydney FC	6	1	2	3	8	10	−2	5		1–1	1–2	2–2	—

Source: AFC

== Knockout stage ==
In the knockout stage, the 16 teams played a single-elimination tournament, with the teams split into the two regions until the final. Each tie was played as a single-leg match at centralised venues, instead of the usual home-and-away two-legged basis as planned before the COVID-19 pandemic. Extra time and a penalty shoot-out were used to decide the winners if necessary.

=== Bracket ===
The bracket was decided after the draw for the quarter-finals. The draw for the West Region quarter-finals was held on 28 September 2020, 11:00 AST (UTC+3), and the draw for the East Region quarter-finals was held on 8 December 2020, 11:30 AST (UTC+3), both in Doha, Qatar.

Round of 16
27 September – Al Rayyan (ECS)
(Saudi Arabia) Al-Nassr	1
(Saudi Arabia) Al-Taawoun	0
26 September – Al Wakrah
(Saudi Arabia) Al-Ahli (p)	1 (4)
(United Arab Emirates) Shabab Al-Ahli	1 (3)
27 September – Al Rayyan (ECS)
(Iran) Persepolis	1
(Qatar) Al-Sadd	0
26 September – Al Wakrah
(Uzbekistan) Pakhtakor	2
(Iran) Esteghlal	1
6 December – Al Rayyan (ECS)
(South Korea) Ulsan Hyundai	3
(Australia) Melbourne Victory	0
6 December – Al Rayyan (ECS)
(China) Beijing FC	1
(Japan) FC Tokyo	0
7 December – Al Rayyan (KIS)
(Japan) Vissel Kobe	2
(China) Shanghai SIPG	0
7 December – Al Rayyan (KIS)
(Japan) Yokohama F. Marinos	2
(South Korea) Suwon Samsung Bluewings	3

Quarter-finals
30 September – Al Rayyan (JBHS)
(Saudi Arabia) Al-Nassr	2
(Saudi Arabia) Al-Ahli	0
30 September – Al Rayyan (JBHS)
(Iran) Persepolis	2
(Uzbekistan) Pakhtakor	0
10 December – Al Wakrah
(South Korea) Ulsan Hyundai	2
(China) Beijing FC	0
10 December – Al Wakrah
(Japan) Vissel Kobe (p)	1 (7)
(South Korea) Suwon Samsung Bluewings	1 (6)

Semi-finals
3 October – Al Rayyan (JBHS)
(Saudi Arabia) Al-Nassr	1 (3)
(Iran) Persepolis (p)	1 (5)
13 December – Al Rayyan (JBHS)
(South Korea) Ulsan Hyundai (a.e.t.)	2
(Japan) Vissel Kobe	1

Final
19 December – Al Wakrah
(Iran) Persepolis	1
(South Korea) Ulsan Hyundai	2

=== Round of 16 ===
In the round of 16, the winners of one group played against the runners-up of another group from the same region and the matchups were determined by the group stage draw.

West Region
Team 1	Score	Team 2
Al-Ahli (Saudi Arabia)	1–1 (a.e.t.) (4–3 p)	(United Arab Emirates) Shabab Al-Ahli
Pakhtakor (Uzbekistan)	2–1	(Iran) Esteghlal
Persepolis (Iran)	1–0	(Qatar) Al-Sadd
Al-Nassr (Saudi Arabia)	1–0	(Saudi Arabia) Al-Taawoun

East Region
Team 1	Score	Team 2
Beijing FC (China)	1–0	(Japan) FC Tokyo
Ulsan Hyundai (South Korea)	3–0	(Australia) Melbourne Victory
Vissel Kobe (Japan)	2–0	(China) Shanghai SIPG
Yokohama F. Marinos (Japan)	2–3	(South Korea) Suwon Samsung Bluewings

=== Quarter-finals ===
In the quarter-finals, the four teams from the West Region played in two ties, and the four teams from the East Region played in two ties, with the matchups decided by draw, without any seeding or country protection. The draw for the West Region quarter-finals was held on 28 September 2020, and the draw for the East Region quarter-finals was held on 8 December 2020.

West Region
Team 1	Score	Team 2
Al-Nassr (Saudi Arabia)	2–0	(Saudi Arabia) Al-Ahli
Persepolis (Iran)	2–0	(Uzbekistan) Pakhtakor

East Region
Team 1	Score	Team 2
Ulsan Hyundai (South Korea)	2–0	(China) Beijing FC
Vissel Kobe (Japan)	1–1 (a.e.t.) (7–6 p)	(South Korea) Suwon Samsung Bluewings

=== Semi-finals ===
In the semi-finals, the two quarter-final winners from the West Region played against each other, and the two quarter-final winners from the East Region played against each other.

West Region
Team 1	Score	Team 2
Al-Nassr (Saudi Arabia)	1–1 (a.e.t.) (3–5 p)	(Iran) Persepolis

East Region
Team 1	Score	Team 2
Ulsan Hyundai (South Korea)	2–1 (a.e.t.)	(Japan) Vissel Kobe

=== Final ===
In the final, the two semi-final winners played against each other, at Al Janoub Stadium in Al Wakrah, Qatar.

19 December 2020
15:00 UTC+3

Persepolis (Iran)	1–2	(South Korea) Ulsan Hyundai
Abdi 45'	Live Report; Stats Report	Júnior 45+4', 55' (pen.)

Al Janoub Stadium, Al Wakrah
Attendance: 8,517
Referee: Abdulrahman Al-Jassim (Qatar)

== Awards ==
=== Main awards ===
Award	Player	Team
Most Valuable Player	(South Korea) Yoon Bit-garam	(South Korea) Ulsan Hyundai
Top scorer	(Morocco) Abderrazak Hamdallah	(Saudi Arabia) Al-Nassr
Fair Play Award	(South Korea) Ulsan Hyundai	

Note: Abderrazak Hamdallah finished ahead of Júnior Negrão to win the Top Scorer award despite scoring the same number of goals, and also having the same number of assists (first tiebreaker), since he played fewer minutes throughout the competition (second tiebreaker).

=== All Star Squad ===
Position	Player	Team
Goalkeeper	(South Korea) Jo Su-huk	(South Korea) Ulsan Hyundai
Goalkeeper	(Iran) Hamed Lak	(Iran) Persepolis
Defenders	(Netherlands) Dave Bulthuis	(South Korea) Ulsan Hyundai
Defenders	(Iran) Saeid Aghaei	(Iran) Persepolis
Defenders	(Iran) Hossein Kanaanizadegan	(Iran) Persepolis
Defenders	(Saudi Arabia) Sultan Al-Ghanam	(Saudi Arabia) Al-Nassr
Defenders	(Uzbekistan) Anzur Ismailov	(Uzbekistan) Pakhtakor Tashkent
Midfielders	(Iran) Ahmad Nourollahi	(Iran) Persepolis
Midfielders	(Iran) Siamak Nemati	(Iran) Persepolis
Midfielders	(Iraq) Bashar Resan	(Iran) Persepolis
Midfielders	(Brazil) Renato Augusto	(China) Beijing Guoan
Midfielders	(South Korea) Yoon Bit-garam	(South Korea) Ulsan Hyundai
Midfielders	(South Korea) Kim In-sung	(South Korea) Ulsan Hyundai
Midfielders	(South Korea) Sin Jin-ho	(South Korea) Ulsan Hyundai
Midfielders	(South Korea) Ko Seung-beom	(South Korea) Suwon Samsung Bluewings
Midfielders	(Japan) Hotaru Yamaguchi	(Japan) Vissel Kobe
Forwards	(Iran) Mehdi Abdi	(Iran) Persepolis
Forwards	(Syria) Omar Al Somah	(Saudi Arabia) Al-Ahli
Forwards	(Brazil) Douglas	(Japan) Vissel Kobe
Forwards	(Japan) Gotoku Sakai	(Japan) Vissel Kobe
Forwards	(Morocco) Abderazak Hamdallah	(Saudi Arabia) Al-Nassr
Forwards	(Norway) Bjørn Maars Johnsen	(South Korea) Ulsan Hyundai
Forwards	(Brazil) Júnior Negrão	(South Korea) Ulsan Hyundai

=== Opta Best XI ===
Position	Player	Team
Goalkeeper	(Australia) Brad Jones	(Saudi Arabia) Al-Nassr
Defenders	(China) Wang Gang	(China) Beijing Guoan
Defenders	(China) Yu Yang	(China) Beijing Guoan
Defenders	(South Korea) Min Sang-gi	(South Korea) Suwon Samsung Bluewings
Defenders	(Thailand) Theerathon Bunmathan	(Japan) Yokohama F. Marinos
Midfielders	(South Korea) Yoon Bit-garam	(South Korea) Ulsan Hyundai
Midfielders	(Japan) Teruhito Nakagawa	(Japan) Yokohama F. Marinos
Midfielders	(Spain) Jonathan Viera	(China) Beijing Guoan
Forwards	(Japan) Ado Onaiwu	(Japan) Yokohama F. Marinos
Forwards	(Morocco) Abderrazak Hamdallah	(Saudi Arabia) Al-Nassr
Forwards	(Brazil) Alan	(China) Beijing Guoan

=== Fans' awards ===
The AFC took polls of fans in its website after the tournament.

Single awards
Award	Player	Team
Fans' Best Player	(Iran) Hamed Lak	(Iran) Persepolis
Best Goal	(Iran) Mehdi Abdi	(Iran) Persepolis

Fans' Best XI
Position	Player	Team
Goalkeeper	(Iran) Hamed Lak	(Iran) Persepolis
Defenders	(Saudi Arabia) Sultan Al-Ghanam	(Saudi Arabia) Al-Nassr
Defenders	(Iran) Shojae Khalilzadeh	(Iran) Persepolis
Defenders	(Iran) Hossein Kanaanizadegan	(Iran) Persepolis
Defenders	(Iran) Saeid Aghaei	(Iran) Persepolis
Midfielders	(Japan) Teruhito Nakagawa	(Japan) Yokohama F. Marinos
Midfielders	(Iraq) Bashar Resan	(Iran) Persepolis
Midfielders	(Japan) Takuya Kida	(Japan) Yokohama F. Marinos
Forwards	(Morocco) Abderrazak Hamdallah	(Saudi Arabia) Al-Nassr
Forwards	(Brazil) Júnior Negrão	(South Korea) Ulsan Hyundai
Forwards	(Iran) Mehdi Abdi	(Iran) Persepolis

== Statistics ==
=== Statistical leaders ===
Category	Player	Team	Figure
Goals	(Morocco) Abderrazak Hamdallah	(Saudi Arabia) Al-Nassr	7
Goals	(Brazil) Júnior Negrão	(South Korea) Ulsan Hyundai	7
Chances created	(South Korea) Yoon Bit-garam	(South Korea) Ulsan Hyundai	22
Clearances	(Brazil) Maicon Pereira Roque	(Saudi Arabia) Al-Nassr	34
Duels won	(Serbia) Dragan Ćeran	(Uzbekistan) Pakhtakor Tashkent	54
Shooting accuracy	(Algeria) Baghdad Bounedjah	(Qatar) Al-Sadd	61.1%
Passing accuracy	(Iran) Kamal Kamyabinia	(Iran) Persepolis	91.6%
Saves	(South Korea) Jo Su-huk	(South Korea) Ulsan Hyundai	26

=== Top scorers ===
Team eliminated / inactive for this round.
Player is not in the team but team still active for this round.

Rank	Player	Team	MD1	MD2	MD3	MD4	MD5	MD6	R16	QF	SF	F	Total
1	(Morocco) Abderrazak Hamdallah	(Saudi Arabia) Al-Nassr	1	1	2	1			1		1		7
1	(Brazil) Júnior Negrão	(South Korea) Ulsan Hyundai			1	1				2	1	2	7
3	(Australia) Trent Buhagiar	(Australia) Sydney FC		1	1		2	1					5
3	(Norway) Bjørn Maars Johnsen	(South Korea) Ulsan Hyundai						2	2		1		5
5	(China) Alan	(China) Beijing FC		1	1			1	1				4
5	(Iran) Issa Alekasir	(Iran) Persepolis						1	1	2			4
5	(Algeria) Baghdad Bounedjah	(Qatar) Al-Sadd			1	2	1						4
5	(Japan) Ado Onaiwu	(Japan) Yokohama F. Marinos		2		1			1				4
5	(South Korea) Yoon Bit-garam	(South Korea) Ulsan Hyundai		2			2						4
10	(Iran) Mehdi Abdi	(Iran) Persepolis						1			1	1	3
10	(Qatar) Akram Afif	(Qatar) Al-Sadd		1	1	1							3
10	(Qatar) Almoez Ali	(Qatar) Al-Duhail			1	1	1						3
10	(Qatar) Hassan Al-Haydos	(Qatar) Al-Sadd	1	2									3
10	(South Korea) Cho Gue-sung	(South Korea) Jeonbuk Hyundai Motors	1					2					3
10	(Japan) Kyogo Furuhashi	(Japan) Vissel Kobe		1	1					1			3
10	(Colombia) Giovanni Moreno	(China) Shanghai Shenhua				1	2						3
10	(Japan) Teruhito Nakagawa	(Japan) Yokohama F. Marinos		2			1						3
10	(South Korea) Park Chu-young	(South Korea) FC Seoul	1	1		1							3
10	(Brazil) Welliton	(United Arab Emirates) Sharjah					3						3
10	(China) Yu Hanchao	(China) Shanghai Shenhua	1		1		1						3
10	(South Korea) Yun Ju-tae	(South Korea) FC Seoul			2		1						3

Note: Goals scored in the qualifying play-offs and matches voided by AFC are not counted when determining top scorer (Regulations Article 64.4).

== Toyota Player of the Week awards ==
Stage	Matchday	Player of the Week	Team	Ref.
Group stage	Matchday 1	(Japan) Keijiro Ogawa	(Japan) Vissel Kobe	
Group stage	Matchday 2	(Japan) Teruhito Nakagawa	(Japan) Yokohama F. Marinos	
Group stage	Matchday 2	(China) Li Shenglong	(China) Shanghai SIPG	
Group stage	Matchday 3 – East	(Australia) Terry Antonis	(South Korea) Suwon Samsung Bluewings	
Group stage	Matchday 3 – East	(South Korea) Song Bum-keun	(South Korea) Jeonbuk Hyundai Motors	
Group stage	Matchday 3 – West	(Morocco) Abderrazak Hamdallah	(Saudi Arabia) Al-Nassr	
Group stage	Matchday 4 – East	(Brazil) Bill	(Thailand) Chiangrai United	
Group stage	Matchday 4 – West	(United Arab Emirates) Khaled Ba Wazir	(United Arab Emirates) Sharjah	
Group stage	Matchday 5 – East	(Thailand) Theerathon Bunmathan	(Japan) Yokohama F. Marinos	
Group stage	Matchday 5 – West	(Brazil) Caio	(United Arab Emirates) Sharjah	
Group stage	Matchday 6 – East	(Japan) Daiki Niwa	(Japan) FC Tokyo	
Group stage	Matchday 6 – West	(Iran) Mehdi Ghayedi	(Iran) Esteghlal	
Knockout stage	Round of 16 – East	(South Korea) Kim Tae-hwan	(South Korea) Suwon Samsung Bluewings	
Knockout stage	Round of 16 – West	(Iran) Issa Alekasir	(Iran) Persepolis	
Knockout stage	Quarter-finals – East	(South Korea) Park Sang-hyeok	(South Korea) Suwon Samsung Bluewings	
Knockout stage	Quarter-finals – West	(Saudi Arabia) Sultan Al-Ghanam	(Saudi Arabia) Al-Nassr	
Knockout stage	Semi-finals – East	(Japan) Daiya Maekawa	(Japan) Vissel Kobe	
Knockout stage	Semi-finals – West	(Iran) Shoja' Khalilzadeh	(Iran) Persepolis	

== See also ==
- 2020 AFC Cup
