= 2019–20 Tractor S.C. season =

Tractor
2019–20 season
- Owner: Mohammad Reza Zonuzi
- Chairman: Gholam Reza Sadeghian (until 9 December 2019); Mir Masoum Sohrabi (from 10 December 2019)
- Manager: Mustafa Denizli (until 7 December 2019); Saket Elhami (from 11 December 2019)
- Stadium: Yadegar-e Emam Stadium
- Persian Gulf Pro League: 4th
- Hazfi Cup: Winners
- Highest home attendance: 80,000 (vs Perspolis)
Home colours	Away colours

The 2019–20 season is the Tractor Sport Club's 12th season in the Pro League, and their 11th consecutive season in the top division of Iranian Football. They will also be competing in the Hazfi Cup.

== Players ==
=== First team squad ===
As of 11 September 2019.

No.	Name	Nationality	Position (s)	Date of birth (age)	Signed from
Goalkeepers
1	Mohammad Rashid Mazaheri	(Iran)	GK	May 18, 1989 (aged 30)	(Iran) Zob Ahan
33	Reza Seyf Ahmadi ^{U21}	(Iran)	GK	March 28, 1999 (aged 20)	(Iran) Tractor U21
97	Mohammad Reza Akhbari	(Iran)	GK	February 15, 1993 (aged 26)	(Iran) Saipa
Defenders
2	Ahmad Mousavi	(Iran)	RB	February 4, 1994 (aged 25)	(Iran) Machine Sazi
3	Mohammad Reza Khanzadeh	(Iran)	CB	January 20, 1992 (aged 27)	(Qatar) Al Ahli
4	Iman Salimi	(Iran)	CB	June 1, 1996 (aged 23)	(Iran) Pars Jonoubi Jam
14	Meysam Teymouri	(Iran)	LB	July 6, 1992 (aged 27)	(Iran) Esteghlal
30	Abolfazl Razzaghpour	(Iran)	LB	September 17, 1997 (aged 21)	(Iran) Paykan
70	Mehdi Tikdari	(Iran)	RB, RW	June 13, 1996 (aged 23)	(Iran) Mes Kerman
Midfielders
6	Akbar Imani	(Iran)	CDM	March 21, 1992 (aged 27)	(Iran) Sanat Naft
7	Masoud Shojaei	(Iran)	CAM, CM, RW, LW	June 9, 1984 (aged 35)	(Greece) AEK Athens
8	Saeid Mehri	(Iran)	CM, CAM	September 16, 1995 (aged 23)	(Iran) Machine Sazi
9	Reza Asadi	(Iran)	CDM	January 17, 1996 (aged 23)	(Iran) Saipa
17	Reza Shekari ^{U23}	(Iran)	CAM	May 31, 1998 (aged 21)	(Russia) Rubin Kazan
21	Ashkan Dejagah	(Iran)	CAM, RW, LW	July 5, 1986 (aged 33)	(England) Nottingham Forest
23	Willyan Mimbela	(Peru)	CAM, CM	May 15, 1992 (aged 27)	(Peru) Unión Comercio
28	Ehsan Hajsafi	(Iran)	CDM, LB, LM	February 25, 1990 (aged 29)	(Greece) Olympiacos
Forwards
10	Sasan Ansari	(Iran)	CF, LW, RW,	May 4, 1991 (aged 28)	(Iran) Sepahan
11	Mazola	(Brazil)	RW, CF	May 8, 1989 (aged 30)	(Brazil) São Bento
13	Kévin Fortuné	(France)	CF, SS	August 6, 1989 (aged 30)	(France) Troyes
16	Mohammad Reza Azadi ^{U21}	(Iran)	CF, RW	December 7, 1999 (aged 19)	(Iran) Tractor U19
24	Yukiya Sugita	(Japan)	LW, RW, CAM, CF	April 22, 1993 (aged 26)	(Sweden) Dalkurd
34	Mehdi Babri ^{U21}	(Iran)	RW	October 28, 1998 (aged 20)	(Iran) Tractor U19
78	Sobhan Khaghani ^{U21}	(Iran)	LW	January 27, 2000 (aged 19)	(Iran) Meshki Pooshan
88	Hamed Hosseinalizadeh ^{U23}	(Iran)	LW, LM, RW	January 9, 1998 (aged 21)	(Iran) Tractor U19

== Transfers ==
=== In ===
No.	Pos.	Nat.	Name	Age	Moving from	Type	Transfer window	Ends
1	GK	(Iran)	Mohammad Rashid Mazaheri	30	(Iran) Zob Ahan	Transfer	Summer	2023
3	DF	(Iran)	Mohammad Reza Khanzadeh	27	(Qatar) Al-Ahli	Transfer	Summer	2023
8	MF	(Iran)	Saeid Mehri	23	(Iran) Machine Sazi	Transfer	Summer	2023
70	DF	(Iran)	Mehdi Tikdari	23	(Iran) Mes Kerman	Transfer	Summer	2023
77	DF	(Iran)	Mohammad Moslemipour	22	(Iran) Sepahan	Transfer	Summer	2021
26	DF	(Iran)	Masih Zahedi	26	(Iran) Machine Sazi	Transfer	Summer	2021
14	DF	(Iran)	Meysam Teymouri	27	(Iran) Esteghlal	Transfer	Summer	2020
17	MF	(Iran)	Reza Shekari	21	(Russia) Rubin Kazan	Transfer	Summer	2024
11	FW	(Brazil)	Mazola	30	Free agent	Transfer	Summer	2021
9	MF	(Iran)	Reza Asadi	23	(Iran) Saipa	Transfer	Summer	2020
23	MF	(Peru)	Willyan Mimbela	27	(Peru) Unión Comercio	Transfer	Summer	2022
13	FW	(France)	Kévin Fortuné	30	(France) Troyes AC	Transfer	Summer	2022
30	DF	(Iran)	Abolfazl Razzaghpour	21	(Iran) Paykan	Transfer	Summer	2023

=== Out ===
No.	Pos.	Nat.	Name	Age	Moving to	Type	Transfer window
19	FW	(Scotland)	Lee Erwin	24	Unattached	Released	Summer
23	DF	(Guinea)	Kévin Constant	32	Unattached	Released	Summer
2	DF	(Iran)	Mohammad Tayyebi	32	Unattached	Released	Summer
6	MF	(Iran)	Alireza Naghizadeh	26	(Iran) Sepahan	Transfer	Summer
5	DF	(Iran)	Ali Abdollahzadeh	26	(Iran) Pars Jonoubi Jam	Transfer	Summer
28	FW	(Republic of Ireland)	Anthony Stokes	31	Unattached	Released	Summer
9	MF	(Iran)	Mehdi Mehdipour	25	(Iran) Zob Ahan	End of loan	Summer
11	DF	(Iran)	Danial Esmaeilifar	26	(Iran) Zob Ahan	End of loan	Summer
10	FW	(Iran)	Ehsan Pahlavan	26	(Iran) Zob Ahan	End of loan	Summer
77	DF	(Iran)	Mohammad Moslemipour	22	(Iran) Machine Sazi	Transfer	Summer
26	DF	(Iran)	Masih Zahedi	26	(Iran) Machine Sazi	Transfer	Summer

== Coaching staff ==
Position	Staff
head coach	(Iran) Saket Elhami
Assistant coaches	(Iran) Alireza Pejman
Fitness coach	(Iran) Hamidreza Joudaki Nejad
Goalkeeper coach	(Romania) Alin Dincă
Team manager	(Iran) Ayoub Zolfagari

== Competitions ==
=== Overview ===
Competition	First match	Last match	Starting round	Final position	Record							
Competition	First match	Last match	Starting round	Final position	Pld	W	D	L	GF	GA	GD	Win %
Pro League	22 August 2019	20 August 2020	Matchday 1	4th	30	14	8	8	31	23	+8	46.67
Hazfi Cup	22 September 2019	3 September 2020	Round of 32	Winners	5	4	1	0	11	5	+6	80.00
Total					35	18	9	8	42	28	+14	51.43

Source: Competitions

=== Persian Gulf Pro League ===
==== Standings ====
Pos	Team	Pld	W	D	L	GF	GA	GD	Pts	Qualification or relegation
2	Esteghlal	30	14	11	5	55	31	+24	53	Qualification for 2021 AFC Champions League group stage
3	Foolad	30	14	9	7	28	19	+9	51	Qualification for 2021 AFC Champions League qualifying play-offs
4	Tractor	30	14	8	8	31	23	+8	50	Qualification for 2021 AFC Champions League group stage (Note: Tractor qualified to AFC Champions League group stage directly by winning the Hazfi Cup)
5	Sepahan	30	12	13	5	39	22	+17	49	
6	Shahr Khodro	30	12	10	8	27	25	+2	46	

Source: IPL Table, Soccerway
Rules for classification: 1) Points; 2) Goal difference; 3) Goals scored.

==== Results summary ====
Overall								Home						Away					
Pld	W	D	L	GF	GA	GD	Pts	W	D	L	GF	GA	GD	W	D	L	GF	GA	GD
30	14	8	8	31	23	+8	50	11	2	2	21	10	+11	3	6	6	10	13	−3

Last updated: 20 August 2020.
Source: Ipl Stats

==== Results by round ====
Round	1	2	3	4	5	6	7	8	9	10	11	12	13	14	15	16	17	18	19	20	21	22	23	24	25	26	27	28	29	30
Ground	A	H	A	H	A	H	A	A	H	A	H	A	H	A	H	H	A	H	A	H	A	H	H	A	H	A	H	A	H	A
Result	D	W	D	W	W	W	W	L	L	L	W	W	D	L	W	W	L	W	D	W	L	L	W	D	W	D	D	D	W	L
Position	7	4	5	4	2	2	2	3	3	5	4	2	5	5	5	3	3	3	3	2	3	6	5	6	3	4	3	3	3	4

Updated to match(es) played on 20 August 2020. Source: "Ipl".
A = Away; H = Home; W = Win; D = Draw; L = Loss

==== Matches ====
Win Draw Loss Postponed

Date Round	Home	Score	Away	Location

22 August 2019 1	Naft Masjed Soleyman	0–0	Tractor	Masjed Soleyman
20:15 DST+04:30		Report	Khanzadeh (yellow card) 38'	Stadium: Behnam Mohammadi Stadium; Attendance: 500; Referee: Alireza Faghani

30 August 2019 2	Tractor	1–0	Persepolis	Tabriz
17:45 DST+04:30	Hajsafi 45+2', (yellow card) 59'; Salimi (yellow card) 86'; Dejagah (yellow card) 88'	Report	Nemati (yellow card) 18'; Beiranvand (yellow card) 86'	Stadium: Yadegar-e-Emam Stadium; Attendance: 66,833; Referee: Bijan Heydari

15 September 2019 3	Zob Ahan	0–0	Tractor	Isfahan
19:45 DST+04:30	Monazzemi (yellow card) 43'; Bouhamdan (yellow card) 90+2'	Report	Asadi (yellow card) 41'; Fortuné (yellow card) 54'; Teymouri (yellow card) 56'; Salimi (yellow card) 59'; Shojaei (yellow card) 73'	Stadium: Foolad Shahr Stadium; Attendance: 3,000; Referee: Koopal Nazemi

20 September 2019 4	Tractor	1–0	Gol Gohar	Tabriz
17:30 DST+04:30	Pourali 59' (o.g.); Shojaei (yellow card) 84'	Report	Hosseini (yellow card) 41'; Bayrami (yellow card) 43'; Ebrahimi (yellow card) 90+3'	Stadium: Yadegar-e-Emam Stadium; Attendance: 30,000; Referee: Amir Arab Baraghi

25 September 2019 5	Saipa	0–1	Tractor	Tehran
16:15 DST+03:30	Nikkhou (yellow card) 42'; Ramezani (yellow card) 74'	Report	Fortuné 10'	Stadium: Shahid Dastgerdi Stadium; Attendance: 6,000; Referee: Payam Heydari

4 October 2019 6	Tractor	1–0	Pars Jonoubi Jam	Tabriz
18:30 DST+03:30	Hajsafi (yellow card) 15', (goal) 25'	Report	Kakashvili (yellow card) 15'	Stadium: Yadegar-e-Emam Stadium; Attendance: 30,000; Referee: Vahid Kazemi

21 October 2019 7	Nassaji	0–4	Tractor	Qaem Shahr
15:30 DST+03:30	Miri (yellow card) 20'; Bijan (yellow card) 49'; Abbaszadeh (yellow card) 90+1'	Report	Mimbela (yellow card) 49', (goal) 52'; Ansari 61', 63'; Sugita 85'	Stadium: Vatani Stadium; Attendance: 8,000; Referee: Mooud Bonyadifar

25 October 2019 8	Sanat Naft	2–1	Tractor	Abadan
18:00 DST+03:30	Alekasir 20', (yellow card) 21'; Ghoreishi 53'; Nasseri (yellow card) 75'; Rahmani (yellow card) 80'; Momeni (yellow card) 89'	Report	Mimbela (yellow card) 66'; Azadi 82'; Khanzadeh (yellow card) 87'; Hajsafi (yellow card) 89'	Stadium: Takhti Stadium; Attendance: 4,000; Referee: Mohammadreza Akbarian

1 November 2019 9	Tractor	2–4	Esteghlal	Tabriz
18:00 DST+03:30	Azadi 20'; Mimbela (yellow card) 67'; Ansari 78'	Report	Diabaté 40', 65', 69'; Karimi 84'	Stadium: Yadegar-e-Emam Stadium; Attendance: 80,000; Referee: Bijan Heydari

5 November 2019 10	Sepahan	2–0	Tractor	Isfahan
15:30 DST+03:30	Shahbazzadeh 44', (yellow card) 90+5'; Kiros 51'; Mirzaei (yellow card) 90+4'	Report	Mazaheri (yellow card) 90+5'	Stadium: Naghsh-e Jahan Stadium; Attendance: 30,000; Referee: Vahid Kazemi

24 December 2019 11	Tractor	3–1	Shahr Khodro	Tabriz
15:30 DST+03:30	Asadi 37'; Shojaei 50'; Dejagah 72'	Report	Ghaseminejad (yellow card) 49'; Moradmand 53'; Sadeghi (yellow card) 74'; Khorasani (yellow card) 89'	Stadium: Yadegar-e-Emam Stadium; Attendance: 20,000; Referee: Hamid Haj Malek

28 December 2019 12	Paykan	2–3	Tractor	Qods
15:00 DST+03:30	Alimohammadi 52'; Mousavi (yellow card) 59'; Moghanlou 78'	Report	Dejagah (yellow card) 24'; Ansari 53'; Shojaei 62', 87' (pen.); Tikdari (yellow card) 90'	Stadium: Shahr-e Qods Stadium; Attendance: 8,000; Referee: Payam Heydari

5 December 2019 13	Tractor	0–0	Shahin Bushehr	Tabriz
15:30 DST+03:30		Report		Stadium: Yadegar-e-Emam Stadium; Attendance: 4,010; Referee: Seyed Reza Mahdavi

9 December 2019 14	Machine Sazi	2–0	Tractor	Tabriz
15:15 DST+03:30	Tavakoli 39', (yellow card) 71'; Zendehrouh 53'; Hamed Lak (yellow card) 57'; Maeboodi (yellow card) 86'	Report	Mimbela (yellow card) 75'; Hajsafi (yellow card) 75'	Stadium: Bonyan Diesel Stadium; Attendance: 2,000; Referee: Abdolnabi Pourkhalaf

13 December 2019 15	Tractor	1–0	Foolad	Tabriz
15:30 DST+03:30	Hajsafi (yellow card) 66'; Asadi 73'; Mehri (yellow card) 85'; Mazaheri (yellow card) 90+4'	Report	Namdari (yellow card) 12'; Abshak (yellow card) 55'	Stadium: Yadegar-e-Emam Stadium; Attendance: 8,000; Referee: Vahid Kazemi

19 December 2019 16	Tractor	1–0	Naft Masjed Soleyman	Tabriz
15:30 DST+03:30	Imani 68'; Shekari (yellow card) 71'; Shojaei (yellow card) 75'; Mazaheri (yellow card) 76'; Azadi (yellow card) 79'	Report	Alizadeh (yellow card) 71'	Stadium: Yadegar-e-Emam Stadium; Attendance: 8,000; Referee: Amir Arab Baraghi

26 January 2020 17	Persepolis	2–0	Tractor	Tehran
15:15 DST+03:30	Torabi (yellow card) 8'; Alipour 9', (yellow card) 83'; Khalilzadeh (yellow card) 36'; Amiri 55'; Osaguona (yellow card) 71'; Beiranvand (yellow card) 76'; Hosseini (yellow card) 83'; Kamyabinia (yellow card) 90'	Report	Tikdari (yellow card) 1'; Asadi (yellow card) 45+1'; Mehri (yellow card) 88'; Khanzadeh (yellow card) 90+2'	Stadium: Azadi Stadium; Attendance: 40,000; Referee: Mohammadreza Akbarian

31 January 2020 18	Tractor	2–1	Zob Ahan	Tabriz
15:15 DST+03:30	Hajsafi (yellow card) 45+1'; Hamzaoui 47'; Fakhreddini (yellow card) 56'; Ansari 63'; Salimi (yellow card) 90+4'	Report	Monazzemi (yellow card) 27'; Mohammadi 57'; Haghdoust (yellow card) 90+4'	Stadium: Yadegar-e-Emam Stadium; Attendance: 20,000; Referee: Ali Safaei

7 February 2020 19	Gol Gohar	1–1	Tractor	Sirjan
16:40 DST+03:30	Mahmoudabadi (yellow card) 76'; Mensha 77'	Report	Yuri (yellow card) 80'; Shojaei (red card) 82'; Imani 88'	Stadium: Imam Ali Stadium; Attendance: 3,500; Referee: Mehdi Seyedali

14 February 2020 20	Tractor	3–1	Saipa	Tabriz
15:00 DST+03:30	Dejagah 16'; Hajsafi 18'; Hamzaoui (yellow card) 25'; Asadi 28'	Report	Soleimani 8' (pen.)	Stadium: Yadegar-e-Emam Stadium; Attendance: 3,100; Referee: Vahid Kazemi

28 February 2020 21	Pars Jonoubi Jam	1–0	Tractor	Jam
17:30 DST+03:30	Entezari 35' (pen.); Karimzadeh (yellow card) 44'; Hatami (yellow card) 62'; Bagheri (yellow card) 85'	Report	Ansari (yellow card) 45'; Khanzadeh (yellow card) 75'	Stadium: Takhti Stadium; Attendance: 0 Referee: Hassan Akrami
Note: Match was played behind closed doors due to concerns over the coronavirus pandemic.

28 June 2020 22	Tractor	0–1	Nassaji	Tabriz
20:15 DST+04:30	Mimbela (yellow card) 74'	Report	Zamehran 3'; Masoumi (yellow card) 14' (yellow-red card) 90+6'; Miri (yellow card) 33'; Mahini (yellow card) 53'	Stadium: Yadegar-e-Emam Stadium; Attendance: 0 Referee: Koopal Nazemi
Note: Match was played behind closed doors due to concerns over the coronavirus pandemic.

4 July 2020 23	Tractor	2–0	Sanat Naft	Tabriz
20:15 DST+04:30	Hajsafi 42', 60'	Report		Stadium: Yadegar-e-Emam Stadium; Attendance: 0 Referee: Hamid Haj Malek
Note: Match was played behind closed doors due to concerns over the coronavirus pandemic.

11 July 2020 24	Esteghlal	0–0	Tractor	Tehran
21:00 DST+04:30	Dashti (yellow card) 1'; Rezavand (yellow card) 53'; Zakipour (yellow card) 81'; Rigi (yellow card) 85'	Report	Imani (yellow card) 53'	Stadium: Azadi Stadium; Attendance: 0 Referee: Hassan Akrami
Note: Match was played behind closed doors due to concerns over the coronavirus pandemic.

17 July 2020 25	Tractor	2–1	Sepahan	Tabriz
20:15 DST+04:30	Hajsafi 14'; Asadi 45+4'; Mehri (yellow card) 60'; Imani (yellow card) 69'; Mazaheri (yellow card) 81'; Salimi (yellow card) 89'	Report	Rafiei 22'; Aghaei (yellow card) 45'; Hosseini (yellow card) 90+6'	Stadium: Yadegar-e-Emam Stadium; Attendance: 0 Referee: Mohammad Hossein Zahedifar
Note: Match was played behind closed doors due to concerns over the coronavirus pandemic.

23 July 2020 26	Shahr Khodro	0–0	Tractor	Mashhad
20:15 DST+04:30	Sadeghi (yellow card) 45'; Taheran (yellow card) 69'	Report	Dejagah (yellow card) 83'	Stadium: Imam Reza Stadium; Attendance: 0 Referee: Bijan Heydari
Note: Match was played behind closed doors due to concerns over the coronavirus pandemic.

31 July 2020 27	Tractor	0–0	Paykan	Tabriz
20:00 DST+04:30	Mehri (yellow card) 38'	Report	Koushki (yellow card) 7'; Mousavi (yellow card) 33'	Stadium: Yadegar-e-Emam Stadium; Attendance: 0 Referee: Reza Kermanshahi
Note: Match was played behind closed doors due to concerns over the coronavirus pandemic.

10 August 2020 28	Shahin Bushehr	0–0	Tractor	Bushehr
20:30 DST+04:30	Soltani Mehr (yellow card) 16'	Report	Dejagah (yellow card) 60'; Shekari (yellow card) 85'	Stadium: Shahid Mahdavi Stadium; Attendance: 0 Referee: Mehdi Seyedali
Note: Match was played behind closed doors due to concerns over the coronavirus pandemic.

15 August 2020 29	Tractor	2–1	Machine Sazi	Tabriz
20:45 DST+04:30	Asadi 71'; Azadi 88', (yellow card) 88'; Imani (yellow card) 90+1'; Ansari (yellow card) 90+10'	Report	Eslamikhah (yellow card) 45+3'; Moradi (yellow card) 60'; Abedini 85'	Stadium: Yadegar-e-Emam Stadium; Attendance: 0 Referee: Hamid Haj Malek
Note: Match was played behind closed doors due to concerns over the coronavirus pandemic.

20 August 2020 30	Foolad	1–0	Tractor	Ahvaz
20:45 DST+04:30	Aghasi 7'; Gordan (yellow card) 41'; Bouazar (yellow card) 45'; Najjarian (yellow card) 48'; Ahmadzadeh (yellow card) 90+9'	Report	Shojaei (yellow card) 10'; Asadi (yellow card) 37'; Salimi (yellow card) 90+1'	Stadium: Foolad Arena; Attendance: 0 Referee: Mohammad Hossein Zahedifar
Note: Match was played behind closed doors due to concerns over the coronavirus pandemic.

=== Hazfi Cup ===
29 September 2019 Round of 32	PAS Hamedan	1–2	Tractor	Hamedan
15:30 DST+03:30	Roohollah Soltani 67' (pen.)	Report	Dejagah 14'; Azadi 41'	Stadium: Haji Babayi; Attendance: 4,000; Referee: Hassan Akrami

26 November 2019 Round of 16	Navad Urmia	1–1 (a.e.t.) (6–7 p)	Tractor	Urmia
14:00 DST+03:30	Sirous Sadeghian 55'	Report	Shojaei 41'	Stadium: Shahid Bakeri; Referee: Amir Arab Baraghi
	Penalties
	Sadeghian (penalty scored); Ghasemi (penalty scored); Soudagar (penalty missed); Rezaei (penalty scored); Ebadzadeh (penalty scored); Mostafavi (penalty scored); Mohammadi (penalty missed)		Dejagah (penalty scored); Khanzadeh (penalty scored); Mimbela (penalty missed); Shojaei (penalty scored); Tikdari (penalty scored); Azadi (penalty scored); Mehri (penalty scored)

19 February 2020 Quarter-finals	Tractor	4–1	Mes Kerman	Tabriz
15:00 DST+03:30	Khanzadeh 31'; Dejagah 42'; Asadi 45' (pen.); Mehri 77'	Report	Gholami (yellow card) 12'; Farrokhi 61'	Stadium: Yadegar-e Emam Stadium; Attendance: 5,000; Referee: Mohammad Hossein Torabian

25 August 2020 Semi-finals	Tractor	1–0	Naft Masjed Soleyman	Tabriz
19:30 DST+04:30	Tikdari (yellow card) 43'; Asadi (yellow card) 45+4' (yellow-red card) 76'; Mehri 47'	Report	Alizadeh (yellow card) 13'; Eidy (yellow card) 60'	Stadium: Yadegar-e Emam Stadium; Attendance: 0 Referee: Bijan Heydari
Note: Match was played behind closed doors due to concerns over the coronavirus pandemic.

3 September 2020 Final	Esteghlal	2–3	Tractor	Mashhad
18:15 DST+04:30	Ghayedi 50'; Motahari 80'; Esmaeili (yellow card) 89'	Report	Teymouri (yellow card) 7'; Khanzadeh 17'; Dejagah 34'; Imani (yellow card) 39', (goal) 42'; Ansari (yellow card) 54'; Hajsafi (yellow card) 90+2'	Stadium: Imam Reza Stadium; Attendance: 0 Referee: Mooud Bonyadifar; Man of the Match: Ashkan Dejagah
Note: Match was played behind closed doors due to concerns over the coronavirus pandemic.
