= 2020 Hazfi Cup final =

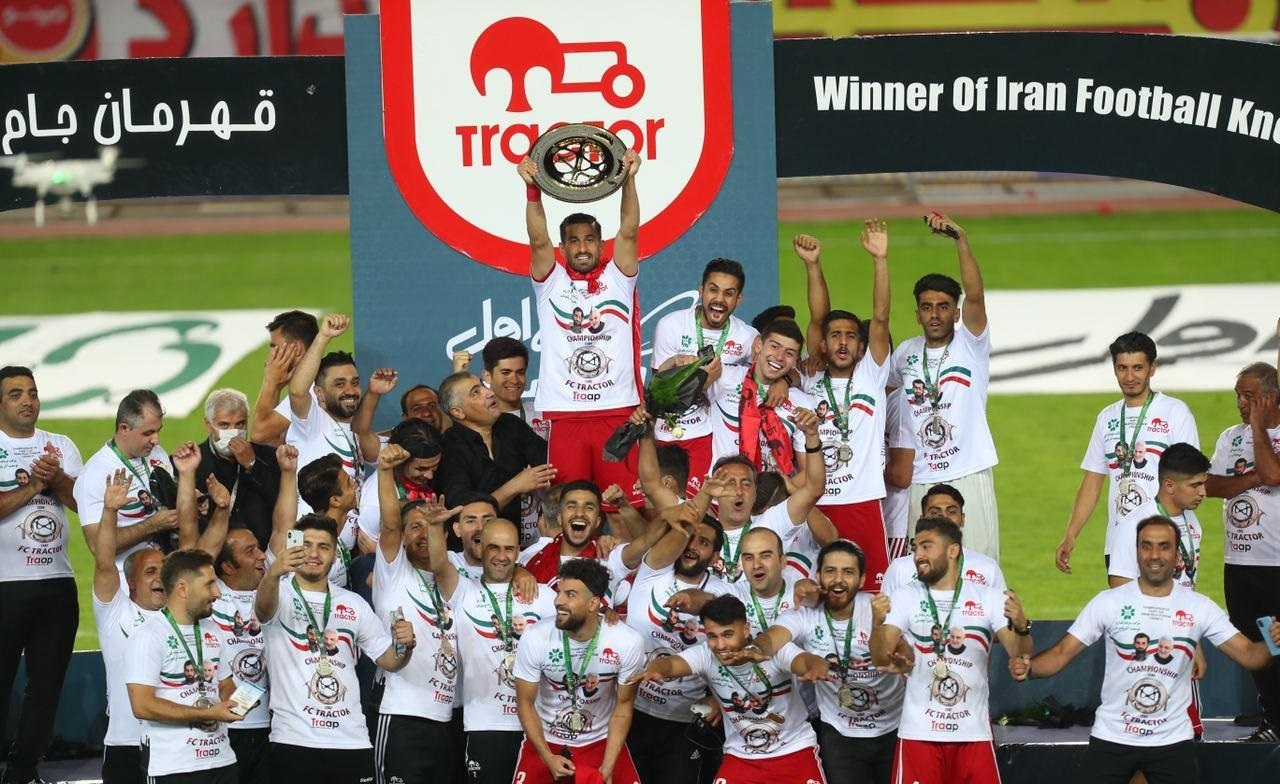
- Event: 2019–20 Hazfi Cup
Tractor	Esteghlal
3	2
- Date: 3 September 2020
- Venue: Imam Reza Stadium, Mashhad
- Man of the Match: Ashkan Dejagah
- Referee: Mooud Bonyadifar
- Attendance: 0
- Weather: Clear; 32 °C (90 °F); 11% humidity

2020 Hazfi Cup final was the final match of the 33rd edition of Hazfi Cup that was held between Tractor and Esteghlal at Imam Reza Stadium in Mashhad. Tractor won 3–2 against Esteghlal and won the cup for the second time.

Originally, the final was planned to be held at Pars Stadium in Shiraz in mid-May 2020 but it was delayed. On 26 August 2020, the final venue was also changed due to problems with the field in Pars stadium. The match was also played behind closed doors due to the COVID-19 pandemic in Iran.

== Teams ==
Team	City	Previous finals appearances (bold indicates winners)
Tractor	Tabriz	4 (1976, 1995, **2014**, 2017)
Esteghlal	Tehran	11 (**1977**, 1991, **1996**, 1999, **2000**, **2002**, 2004, **2008**, **2012**, 2016, **2018**)

== Route to the final ==
=== Tractor ===
Round	Opposition	Score
Round of 32	PAS Hamedan (A)	2–1
Round of 16	Navad Urmia (A)	1–1 (P: 7–6)
Quarter-final	Mes Kerman (H)	4–1
Semi-Final	Naft Masjed Soleyman (H)	1–0
Key: (H) = Home venue; (A) = Away venue; (N) = Neutral venue

Tractor, as an Iran Pro League club, started in the Round of 32 against League 2 side Pas Hamedan and won 2–1 with goals from Ashkan Dejagah and Mohammad Reza Azadi at their Haj Babayi Stadium. In the next round, they drew Navad Urmia at Takhti Stadium of Urumia and they won 7–6 in a penalty shoot-out after a 1–1 draw in 120 minutes. In the quarter-final round they were drawn with Mes Kerman at home and won 4–1 with goals from Mohammad Reza Khanzadeh, Ashkan Dejagah, Mohammad Reza Azadi and Saeid Mehri. In the semi-final at Yadegar-e Emam Stadium, Tractor played the first team from Iran Pro League Naft Masjed Soleyman in the cup. Tractor reached the final after a 1–0 win with a goal from Saeid Mehri.

=== Esteghlal ===
Round	Opposition	Score
Round of 32	Gol Reyhan Alborz (A)	3-1 (aet)
Round of 16	Fajr Sepasi Shiraz (H)	3-0 (aet)
Quarter-final	Sepahan Isfahan (H)	2–0
Semi-Final	Persepolis (A)	2-2; P: 4–1
Key: (H) = Home venue; (A) = Away venue; (N) = Neutral venue

Esteghlal, as a Iran Pro League club, started in the Round of 32 against Azadegan League side Gol Reyhan Alborz and won 3–1 after extra time with goals from Sajjad Aghaei and Farshid Esmaeili and an own goal at Enghelab Karaj Stadium. In the next round, they faced another Azadegan League side Fajr Sepasi Shiraz at Azadi Stadium and they won 3–0 after extra time with goals from Voria Ghafouri, Sajjad Aghaei and Dariush Shojaeian. In the quarter-final round they were drawn with Sepahan Isfahan at home and won 2–0 with goals from Voria Ghafouri and Ali Karimi. In the semi-final at Azadi Stadium, Esteghlal played with Persepolis in the 93rd Tehran Derby. Esteghlal won semi-final match in a penalty shoot-out after a 2–2 draw in 120 minutes. Mehdi Ghayedi and Mohammad Daneshgar scored goals for Esteghlal and Cheick Diabaté, Vouria Ghafouri, Hrvoje Milić and Amir Arsalan Motahari scored their penalties while Hossein Hosseini saved one penalty as the goalkeeper.

== Details ==
3 September 2020
18:15

Esteghlal	2–3	Tractor
Ghayedi 51'; Motahari 79'	Report	Khanzadeh 17'; Dejagah 34'; Imani 41'

Imam Reza, Mashhad
Attendance: 0
Referee: Mooud Bonyadifar

Assistant Referees:
(Iran) Saeid Alinezhadian
(Iran) Saeid Ghasemi
Additional AR:
(Iran) Seyed Vahid Kazemi
(Iran) Amir Arabbaraghi
Fourth official:
(Iran) Morteza Mansourian
