= Carl Thulin =

Swedish footballer

Personal information
- Full name: Carl Erik Oscar Thulin
- Date of birth: 5 July 1999 (age 27)
- Place of birth: Svalöv, Sweden
- Height: 1.83 m (6 ft 0 in)
- Position: Centre-back

Team information
- Current team: Åtvidabergs FF
- Number: 3

Youth career
- Svalövs BK
- 2014–2018: Helsingborgs IF

Senior career*
Years	Team	Apps	(Gls)
2017–2020	Helsingborgs IF	5	(0)
2018	→ Ängelholms FF (loan)	7	(0)
2019	→ Eskilsminne IF (loan)	20	(0)
2020	→ Eskilsminne IF (loan)	23	(0)
2021	Lunds BK	23	(1)
2022–	Åtvidabergs FF	98	(7)
- * Club domestic league appearances and goals as of 14:45, 19 October 2025 (UTC)

Carl Erik Oscar Thulin (born 5 July 1999) is a Swedish footballer who plays as a centre-back for Åtvidabergs FF in the Swedish Division 2 Södra.

== Club career ==
=== Helsinborgs IF ===
Thulin joined Helsingborgs IF from Svalövs BK at the age of 14 in 2014. He got his official debut for the club on 18 February 2017 against IF Brommapojkarna in the Svenska Cupen. Later in 2017, he also got his league debut for Helsingborgs against Örgryte IS on 29 October in the Superettan. Thulin started on the bench, before coming on the pitch in the 70th minute to replace Peter Larsson. Thulin made a total of three appearances during 2017: two in the league and one in the cup.

On 12 April 2018, Thulin signed a new three-year deal with the club and was permanently promoted to the first team squad. However, he only played two cup games and participated in one league game, why the club decided to loan him out to Ängelholms FF in July 2018 for the rest of the season. During the loan spell, Thulin had the opportunity to play for both Helsingborg and Ängelholms. He made eight appearances in the Division 1 for Ängelholms, while he also made one appearance for Helsingborgs in a cup game in August 2018.

Returning from Ängelholms, Thulin was loaned out again in January 2019, this time to Eskilsminne IF for the rest of 2019. However, Thulin would train and play for both clubs during 2019, but for the most part for Eskilsminne. During 2019, he played 20 games for Eskilsminne and two games for Helsingborgs in the Allsvenskan.

In January 2020, he was once again loaned out to Eskilsminne, for the rest of the season. He returned to Helsingborgs at the end of November 2020. However, the club announced in December 2020, that Thulin would leave the club.

=== Lunds BK ===
On 10 January 2021, Thulin left Helsingborg to join Division 1 Södra club Lunds BK.

=== Åtvidabergs ===
In February 2022, Thulin signed with fellow league club Åtvidabergs FF.
