= Willyan =

Willyan is a given name. Notable people with the name include:

- Willyan Mimbela (born 1992), Peruvian football striker
- Willyan (footballer) (born 1994), full name Willyan da Silva Barbosa, Brazilian football winger
- Willyan Rocha (born 1995), Brazilian football defender
