= Masoud Shojaei =

Iranian footballer (born 1984)

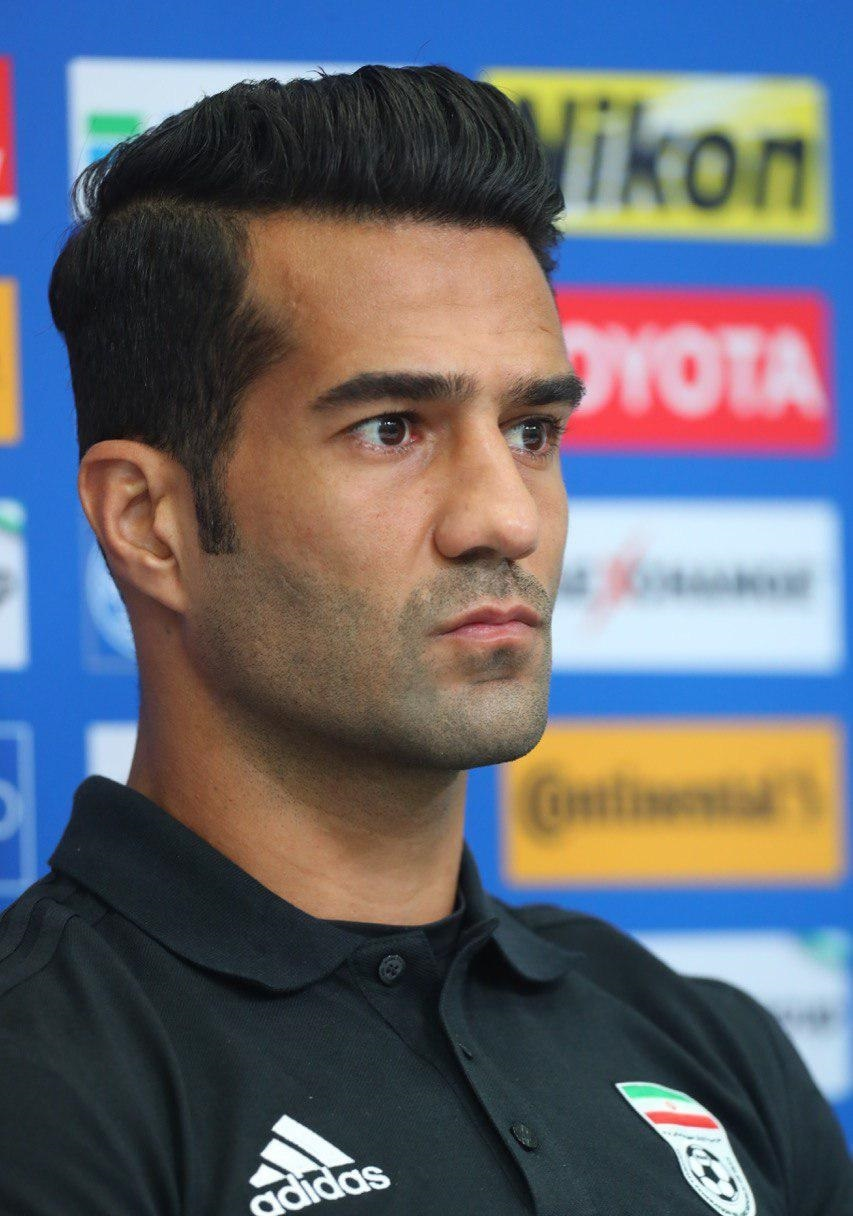
- Shojaei with Iran in 2019

Personal information
- Full name: Masoud Soleimani Shojaei
- Date of birth: 9 June 1984 (age 42)
- Place of birth: Shiraz, Iran
- Height: 1.85 m (6 ft 1 in)
- Position: Attacking midfielder

Youth career
- 1999–2000: Sanat Naft
- 2000–2002: Saipa

Senior career*
Years	Team	Apps	(Gls)
2002–2003	Sanat Naft	12	(1)
2003–2006	Saipa	60	(5)
2006–2008	Al-Sharjah	12	(3)
2008–2013	Osasuna	101	(8)
2013–2014	Las Palmas	29	(5)
2014–2015	Al Shahaniya	24	(5)
2015–2016	Al-Gharafa	25	(4)
2016–2018	Panionios	41	(7)
2018	AEK Athens	12	(0)
2018–2021	Tractor	84	(7)
2021–2023	Nassaji	24	(2)
2023	→ Havadar (loan)	11	(0)

International career
2005	Iran B	6	(1)
2004–2019	Iran	87	(8)

Managerial career
- 2020: Tractor (player-manager)
- 2023–2024: Havadar
- 2024–2025: Mes Rafsanjan
- * Club domestic league appearances and goals

Masoud Soleimani Shojaei (Persian: مسعود سلیمانی شجاعی; born 9 June 1984) is an Iranian coach and former professional footballer. Shojaei played mainly as an attacking midfielder, he could also play as a winger or forward.

After playing in his country for two clubs and with Al-Sharjah in the United Arab Emirates, he went on to spend several seasons in Spain with Osasuna, appearing in 112 official matches.

An Iranian international since 2004, Shojaei has represented his country in three World Cups and four Asian Cups.

== Club career ==
=== Early years ===
Shojaei was born in Shiraz, and lived most of his life in Abadan and Tehran. He started his career with Sanat Naft Abadan F.C. before moving to Saipa F.C. of Karaj in the Iran Pro League; having signed at the age of 19, he went on to play three seasons with the latter.

After the 2006 World Cup, Shojaei moved to the United Arab Emirates and signed for Al Sharjah SC. He scored his first goal for the club in the League on 3 October, against Emirates Club.

=== Osasuna ===
On 23 June 2008, after previous attempts from VfL Wolfsburg in Germany and Italy's S.S.C. Napoli, Shojaei signed with Spanish side CA Osasuna for three years, teaming up with compatriot Javad Nekounam. The deal included a €6 million buyout clause for the first 18 months of his contract, being reduced to €3.5 million for the remainder of his stay.

Shojaei made his La Liga debut on 31 August 2008, playing 32 minutes in a 1–1 home draw against Villarreal CF. During his first two seasons he appeared almost always as a substitute, as the Navarrese managed to maintain its division status; the player remained a regular even after the coaching changed at the club, as José Ángel Ziganda was replaced by José Antonio Camacho.

Shojaei – who was addressed by his first name during his spell in Spain – appeared regularly again for Osasuna in the 2010–11 campaign, but also spent one month at the 2011 AFC Asian Cup with his national team. In late May, he renewed his contract with the club for another two seasons, also having the option of an annual renewal of his link.

Shojaei spent the entire 2011–12 on the sidelines, due to injury. On 25 February 2013, in his fourth appearance since returning, he scored a stunning goal to help Osasuna win it 2–0 at Levante UD.

Despite a solid start to his spell, Shojaei was eventually released in June 2013. Shortly after, he was linked with a move to fellow league club Real Valladolid, but nothing came of it.

=== Las Palmas ===
On 3 September 2013, Shojaei moved clubs but stayed in Spain, joining Segunda División side UD Las Palmas on a one-year contract. He found the net in his debut, in a 3–1 away victory over CE Sabadell FC for the second round of the Copa del Rey.

Shojaei scored twice and provided an assist in the first half of the league fixture against the same opponent on 15 March 2014, in an eventual 5–0 home win.

=== Qatar ===
After the 2014 World Cup, Shojaei turned down an offer from Real Zaragoza and moved to Al-Shahania Sports Club in the Qatar Stars League alongside compatriot Mehrdad Pooladi. On 14 December 2014, he scored a hat-trick in a 3–1 away win against eventual runners-up Al Sadd SC; one year later, after suffering relegation, he joined fellow league club Al-Gharafa for $1 million.

=== Greece ===
On 22 July 2016, Shojaei joined Super League Greece side Panionios on a one-year contract. He enjoyed a successful first season, and subsequently extended his contract until June 2018; on 25 December 2017, however, he severed his link by mutual consent and agreed to a six-month deal at fellow league team AEK Athens three days later, announcing on his Instagram he would be wearing number 24 in tribute of Hadi Norouzi who died in 2015. He made his debut on 6 January, replacing Anastasios Bakasetas in the second half of the match against Panetolikos and later providing the assist for Hélder Lopes goal, in a 4–1 away win. He started his first match three days later against the same opponent, making another assist in a 1–0 victory for the Greek Football Cup's round of 16 and being named as the most valuable player of the match for his performance.

On 1 March 2018, Shojaei put the visitors ahead in their domestic cup semi-final fixture away to AEL, in an eventual 1–2 loss which marked his first goal for the club and the first loss in 26 matches for Manolo Jiménez's team. He contributed to the club's first national championship conquest in 24 years, he left the club.

=== Tractor ===
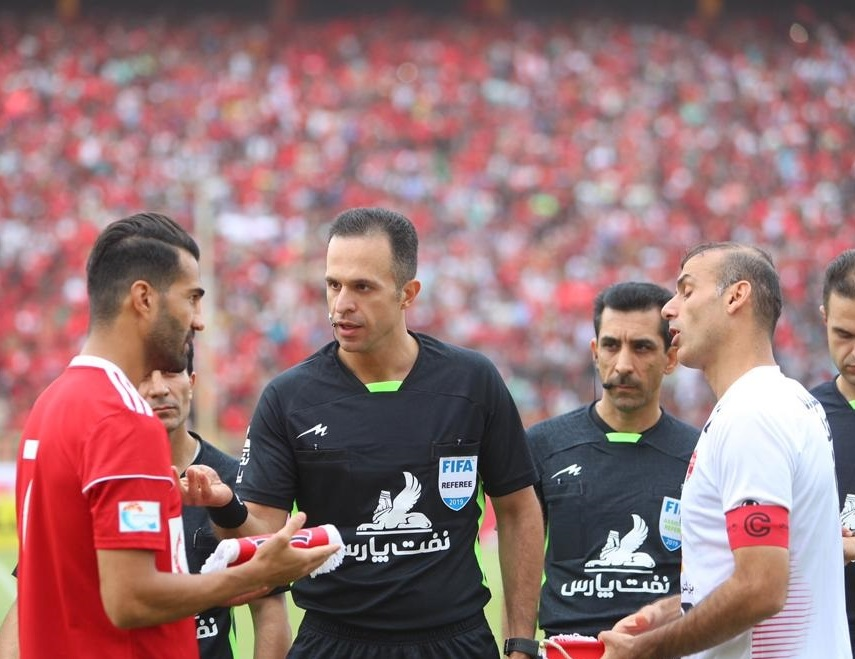
Shojaei (left) with Tractor in 2019

On 2 August 2018, Shojaei joined Tractor S.C. on a three-year contract. 8 days later, he made his debut in a 3–0 defeat against Esteghlal F.C. in which he was chosen as the side's first captain. On 19 April 2019, he was assaulted by a supporter of his own team who invaded the pitch after a 1–0 home defeat of Paykan FC.

Midway through the 2019–20 campaign, Shojaei was offered the interim position after Mustafa Denizli's departure. He declined, instead being named assistant to Ahad Sheykhlari while also being involved in the taking of decisions in training.

=== Nassaji ===
On 5 October 2021, Shojaei joined Nassaji on a two-year contract, reuniting with former Tractor manager Saket Elhami. Following his arrival, he was named the team's new captain. On 27 February in the 2022 Hazfi Cup Final, he played the first half of a goalless draw with Aluminium Arak that his team won on penalties.

== International career ==
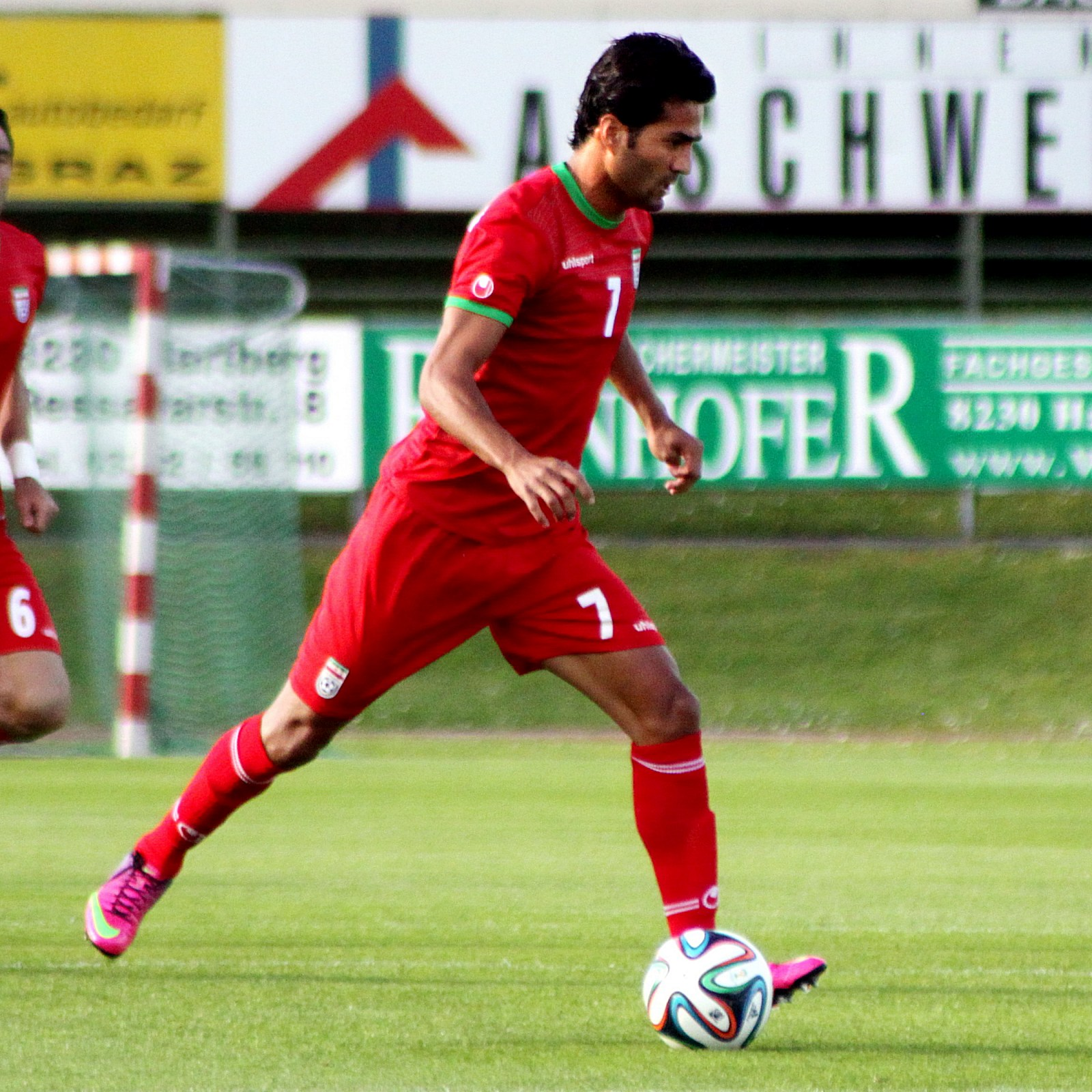
Shojaei playing for Iran in May 2014

Whilst at Saipa, Shojaei earned a place in Iranian national under-23 team, catching the eye of full side coach Branko Ivanković. He was first called up to play for the latter in November 2004, for a 2006 FIFA World Cup qualifier against Laos – it was the only cap he would win until the training camp prior to the finals in Germany, held in Switzerland; he was included in the final squad but only appeared once in the tournament, replacing the injured Mohammad Nosrati in the early minutes of the 1–1 draw against Angola.

Shojaei began appearing more regularly in the 2010 World Cup qualification stages, scoring in a 1–1 draw against South Korea in the final game. However, Team Melli did not qualify for the tournament in South Africa. Iran did manage to reach the 2014 World Cup, with Shojaei as a regular starter in the qualifiers.

On 1 June 2014, Shojaei was included in Carlos Queiroz's list for the World Cup. He appeared as a substitute in the team's opening draw with Nigeria, and was selected in the starting line-up for the following group matches against Argentina and Bosnia-Herzegovina.

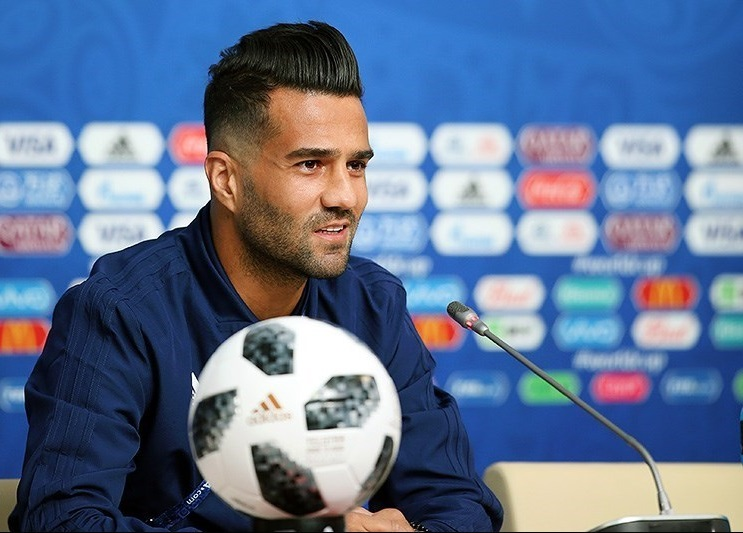
Shojaei attending the press before the match vs. Morocco at the 2018 World Cup

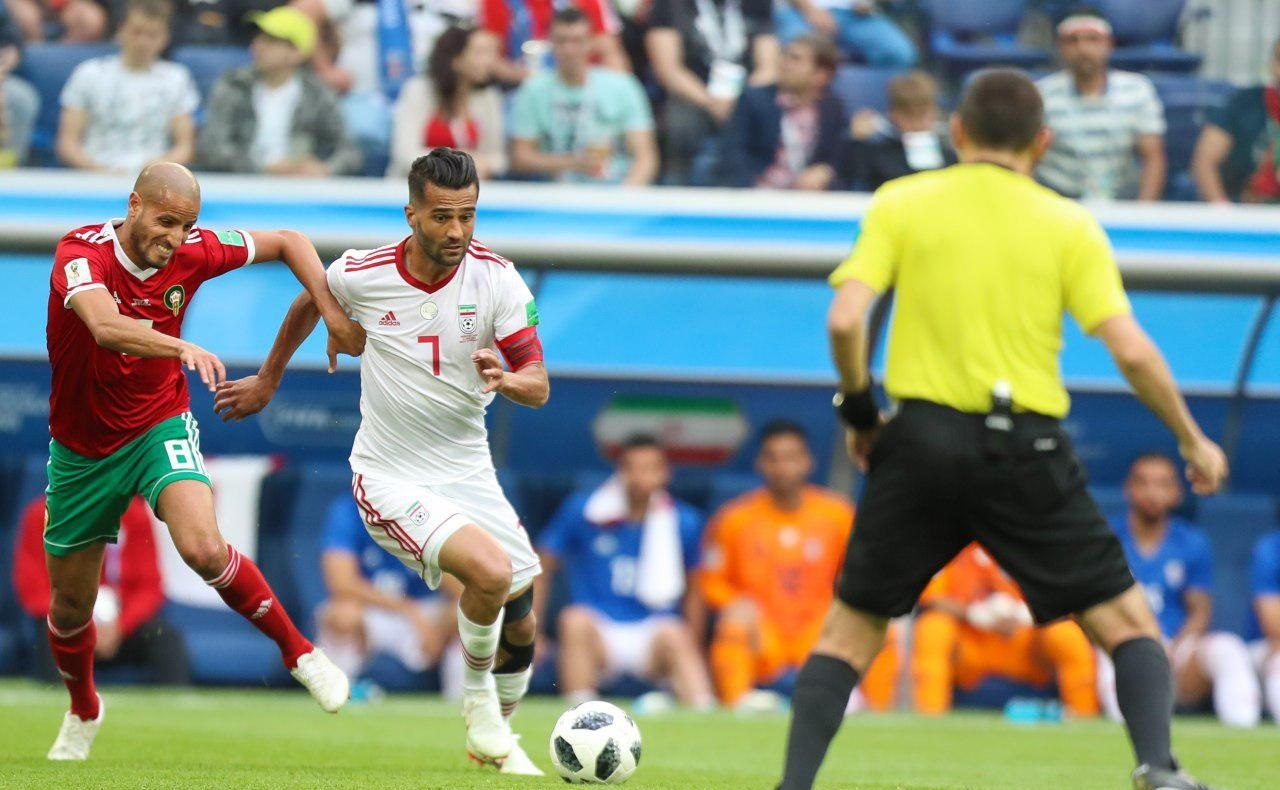
Shojaei captaining Iran, against Morocco in the 2018 FIFA World Cup

On 30 December 2014, Shojaei was called into Iran's 2015 AFC Asian Cup squad. He scored the nation's second goal in its opening 2–0 defeat of Bahrain, in Melbourne.

Shojaei captained the squad in 2018 World Cup qualification home matches against China and Uzbekistan. On 10 August 2017, Mohammad Reza Davarzani, Iran's deputy sports minister, said on Iranian state television both Shojaei and teammate Ehsan Hajsafi would never be invited to the national team again for playing with their club Panionios against Israel's Maccabi Tel Aviv FC; however, the Iranian Football Federation later stated it would review the case and reach a decision after speaking with both, with Hajsafi eventually returning to the side in November and Shojaei stating that they were pressured by their club to play.

On 18 March 2018, Shojaei was called up for friendlies against Tunisia and Algeria, being criticised after his return against the former by an Iranian member of parliament who called for his life ban. He was eventually selected for the finals in Russia as team captain, becoming the first Iranian player to travel to three World Cups. He made his debut in the tournament on 15 June in a 1–0 group stage win against Morocco, but sat on the bench for the next two games in an eventual group stage elimination.

In December 2018, Shojaei was selected for Iran's 23-man squad for the 2019 AFC Asian Cup. He became the only Iranian to participate in seven international tournaments.

== Activism ==
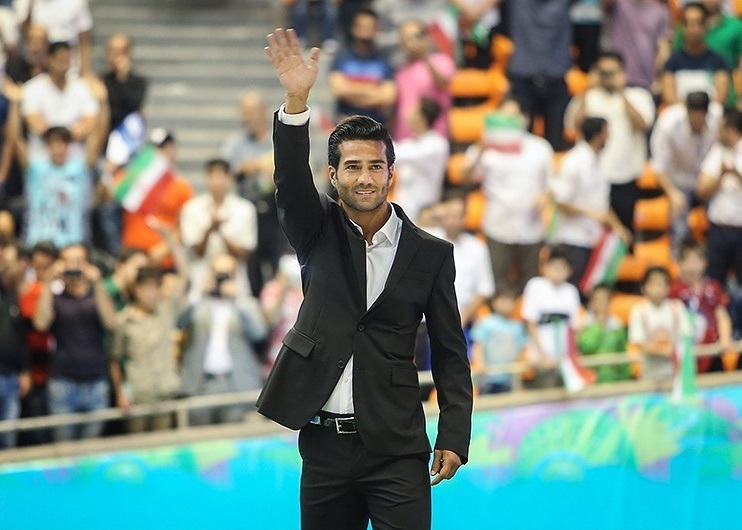
Shojaei in 2014

Shojaei expressed support for the Iranian Green Movement on 17 June 2009, when he wore a green bracelet against South Korea in a World Cup 2010 qualifier along with five other players. During the match, he also wore a green undershirt previewing a possible goal celebration.

Shojaei discussed corruption in Iranian football in an interview with Radio Farda, and also spoke out against child sexual abuses in December 2016. He was subsequently summoned to the Ethics Committee of the Football Federation Islamic Republic of Iran.

A vocal advocate of lifting stadium ban for women in Iran, Shojaei openly expressed his regret that his mother, sister and wife were unable to see him play. He reportedly called for repealing the ban, when he met with president Hassan Rouhani in July 2017.

== Personal life ==
Shojaei's sister, Maryam, was also an activist campaigning for women's rights in Iran.

On 14 January 2026, Shojaei took to his Instagram and criticized FIFA's lack of reaction to the news of several footballers being killed in the 2025–2026 Iranian protests. On 12 March, he supported the defection of several members of the Iran women's national football team to Australia.

== Career statistics ==
=== Club ===
As of 25 May 2023

Appearances and goals by club, season and competition
Club	Season	League			Cup		Continental		Other		Total	
Club	Season	Division	Apps	Goals	Apps	Goals	Apps	Goals	Apps	Goals	Apps	Goals
Sanat Naft	2002–03	Persian Gulf Pro League	12	1	0	0	—		—		12	1
Saipa	2003–04	Persian Gulf Pro League	14	2	0	0	—		—		14	2
Saipa	2004–05	Persian Gulf Pro League	22	1	0	0	—		—		22	1
Saipa	2005–06	Persian Gulf Pro League	24	2	1	0	—		—		25	2
Saipa	Total		60	5	1	0	—		—		61	5
Sharjah	2006–07	UAE Pro League	20	7	0	0	—		—		20	7
Sharjah	2007–08	UAE Pro League	20	5	0	0	—		—		20	5
Sharjah	Total		40	12	0	0	—		—		40	12
Osasuna	2008–09	La Liga	33	3	3	0	—		—		36	3
Osasuna	2009–10	La Liga	36	2	5	1	—		—		41	3
Osasuna	2010–11	La Liga	18	2	2	0	—		—		20	2
Osasuna	2011–12	La Liga	0	0	0	0	—		—		0	0
Osasuna	2012–13	La Liga	14	1	1	0	—		—		15	1
Osasuna	Total		101	8	11	1	—		—		112	9
Las Palmas	2013–14	Segunda División	29	5	2	1	—		0	0	31	6
Al Shahaniya	2014–15	Qatar Stars League	24	5	0	0	—		—		24	5
Al Gharafa	2015–16	Qatar Stars League	25	4	0	0	—		—		25	4
Panionios	2016–17	Super League Greece	30	4	2	0	—		5	0	37	4
Panionios	2017–18	Super League Greece	11	3	1	0	3	0	—		15	3
Panionios	Total		41	7	3	0	3	0	5	0	52	7
AEK Athens	2017–18	Super League Greece	12	0	5	1	1	0	—		18	1
Tractor	2018–19	Persian Gulf Pro League	25	4	1	0	—		—		26	4
Tractor	2019–20	Persian Gulf Pro League	24	3	4	1	—		—		28	4
Tractor	2020–21	Persian Gulf Pro League	12	0	0	0	1	0	0	0	8	0
Tractor	Total		65	7	5	0	1	0	0	0	71	7
Nassaji	2021–22	Persian Gulf Pro League	24	2	3	0	0	0	—		27	2
Havadar	2022–23	Persian Gulf Pro League	11	0	3	1	0	0	—		14	1
Career total			446	56	33	5	5	0	5	0	489	61

== Managerial statistics ==
As of 26 January 2025

Team	From	To	Record							
Team	From	To	G	W	D	L	Win %	GF	GA	+/-
Tractor	December 2020	February 2020	10	5	1	4	50.00	12	10	+2
Havadar	December 2023	June 2024	20	6	7	7	30.00	25	36	-11
Mes Rafsanjan	November 2024	January 2025	9	3	1	5	33.33	11	17	-6
Total			39	14	9	16	35.90	48	63	-15

== International ==
As of 14 November 2019

Appearances and goals by national team and year
National team	Year	Apps	Goals
Iran	2004	1	0
Iran	2006	4	0
Iran	2007	3	0
Iran	2008	10	0
Iran	2009	10	3
Iran	2010	5	1
Iran	2011	4	0
Iran	2012	3	0
Iran	2013	8	1
Iran	2014	7	0
Iran	2015	8	2
Iran	2016	5	1
Iran	2017	3	0
Iran	2018	11	0
Iran	2019	5	0
Total		87	8

As of 7 June 2016

Scores and results list Iran's goal tally first, score column indicates score after each Shojaei goal.

List of international goals scored by Masoud Shojaei
No.	Date	Venue	Cap	Opponent	Score	Result	Competition
1	28 March 2009	Azadi, Tehran, Iran	20	Saudi Arabia	1–0	1–2	2010 World Cup qualification
2	17 June 2009	World Cup Stadium, Seoul, South Korea	24	South Korea	1–0	1–1	2010 World Cup qualification
3	12 August 2009	Asim Ferhatović Hase, Sarajevo, Bosnia and Herzegovina	25	Bosnia and Herzegovina	1–2	3–2	Friendly
4	7 September 2010	World Cup Stadium, Seoul, South Korea	31	South Korea	1–0	1–0	Friendly
5	26 March 2013	Al-Sadaqua Walsalam, Kuwait City, Kuwait	42	Kuwait	1–0	1–1	2015 Asian Cup qualification
6	11 January 2015	Rectangular Stadium, Melbourne, Australia	56	Bahrain	2–0	2–0	2015 AFC Asian Cup
7	17 November 2015	National Football Stadium, Tamuning, Guam	63	Guam	4–0	6–0	2018 World Cup qualification, 2019 Asian Cup qualification
8	7 June 2016	Azadi, Tehran, Iran	65	Kyrgyzstan	1–0	6–0	Friendly

== Honours ==
AEK Athens

- Super League: 2017–18

Tractor

- Hazfi Cup: 2019–20

Nassaji

- Hazfi Cup: 2021–22

Iran

- Islamic Solidarity Games: Bronze medal 2005

Individual

- Super League Greece Team of the Season: 2016–17
