= Reza Shekari =

Iranian footballer (born 1998)

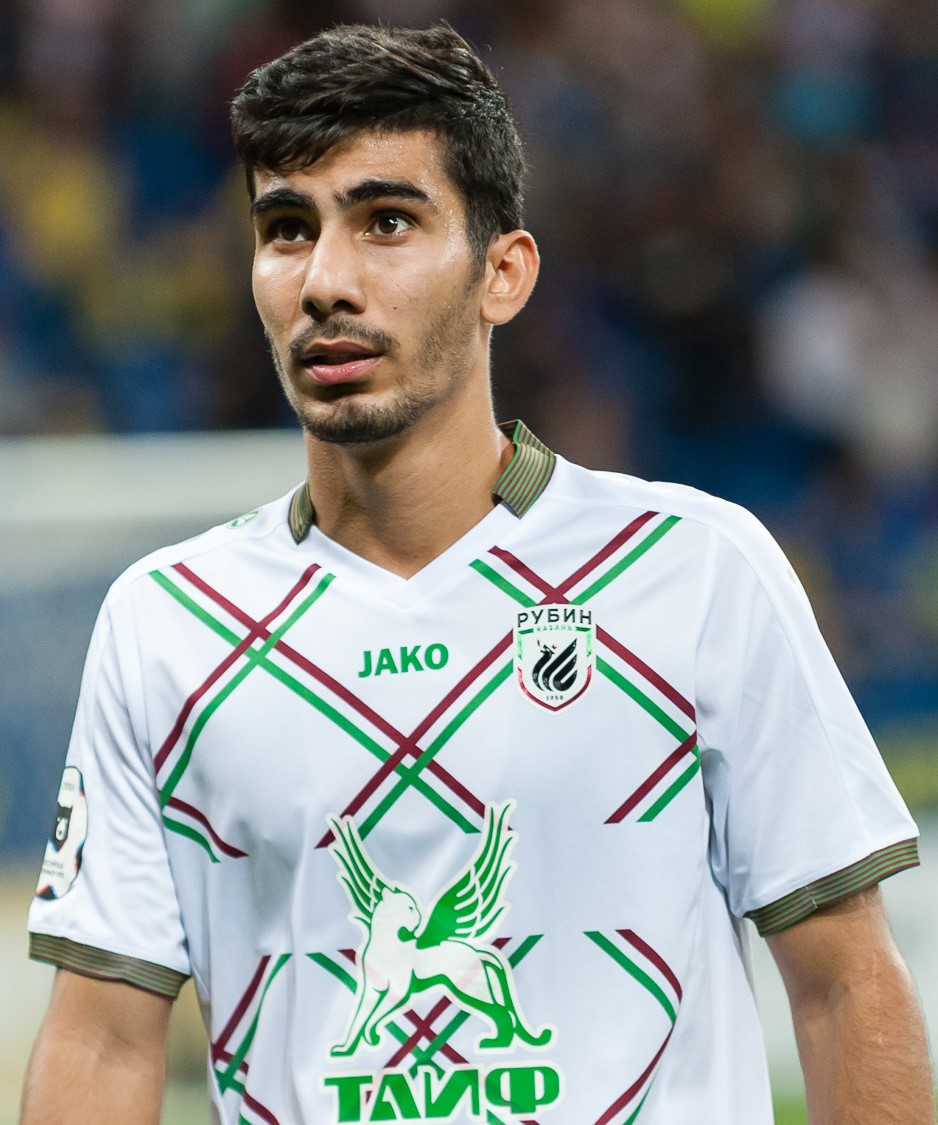
- Shekari with Rubin Kazan in 2018

Personal information
- Full name: Reza Shekari Qezel Qayah
- Date of birth: 31 May 1998 (age 28)
- Place of birth: Tehran, Iran
- Height: 1.85 m (6 ft 1 in)
- Position: Attacking midfielder

Team information
- Current team: Paykan
- Number: 10

Youth career
- 2014–2015: Moghavemat Tehran

Senior career*
Years	Team	Apps	(Gls)
2015–2017	Zob Ahan	18	(0)
2017–2019	Rubin Kazan	5	(0)
2019–2021	Tractor	15	(0)
2021–2023	Gol Gohar	59	(12)
2023–2025	Sepahan	47	(9)
2025–2026	Persepolis	8	(1)
2026–	Paykan	12	(1)

International career
2013–2014	Iran U17	8	(5)
2014–2017	Iran U20	13	(9)
2017–2021	Iran U23	10	(5)
- * Club domestic league appearances and goals as of 20 February 2026

Reza Shekari (Persian: رضا شکاری; born May 31, 1998) is an Iranian footballer who plays for Iranian club Paykan as a Midfielder.

== Club career ==
=== Zob Ahan ===
Shekari joined the Persian Gulf Pro League side Zob Ahan in the summer of 2015 when he signed a 3-year contract with this Isfahani side. He made his debut for Zob Ahan in 2nd fixtures of 2015–16 Persian Gulf Pro League against Sepahan while he substituted in for Mehdi Rajabzadeh. Shekari scored his first professional goal on 4 November 2015 in a 2–0 Hazfi Cup victory against Persepolis.

After a good season with Zob Ahan, Shekari joined the Swiss club FC Basel on a one-week trial in May 2016.

=== Rubin Kazan ===
On 31 August 2017, he signed a contract with the Russian Premier League side FC Rubin Kazan, joining compatriot Sardar Azmoun at the club. Shekari was assigned to the U21 team. He made his Russian Premier League debut on 7 April 2018 in a game against FC Akhmat Grozny.

=== Tractor ===
On 9 July 2019, Iranian club Tractor confirmed that they officially signed Shekari.

== Career statistics ==
=== Club ===
As of 26 June 2026

Club	Season	League			Cup		Continental		Other		Total	
Club	Season	Division	Apps	Goals	Apps	Goals	Apps	Goals	Apps	Goals	Apps	Goals
Persepolis	2025–26	Pro League	8	1	1	0	–		1	0	10	1
Persepolis	Total		8	1	1	0	–		1	0	10	1

== International career ==
=== U17 ===
Shekari was part of Iran U17 from 2013 to 2014. He made eight official appearances for Iran U17 and scored five times.

=== U20 ===
He was invited to Iran U20 by Amir Hossein Peyrovani in 2014. He represented Iran in the AFC U19 Championships, in which Iran reached the semi-finals and qualified for the World Cup. Shekari scored three goals during the 2017 FIFA U-20 World Cup.

=== U23 ===
In June 2015, he was invited to the Iran U23 training camp by Mohammad Khakpour.

== Personal life ==
Reza was born in Tehran.

On 8 January 2026, following Reza Pahlavi's speech supporting the 2025–2026 Iranian protests, TV presenter Mohammad Reza Shahbazi mocked Pahlavi and the protesters, after which, Shekari reposted the video on his Instagram with his own caption "I'll come for you first" (referring to Shahbazi). Shekari was arrested for threatening Shahbazi at Imam Khomeini International Airport upon Persepolis's return from a training camp in Qatar, but was released on 15 January.

== Honours ==
Zob Ahan

- Hazfi Cup (1): 2015–16
- Iranian Super Cup (1): 2016

Tractor

- Hazfi Cup (1): 2019–20

Sepahan

- Hazfi Cup: 2023–24
