= Bahman Salari =

Iranian footballer

Personal information
- Full name: Bahman Salari (Shahram Salari)
- Date of birth: 15 February 1993 (age 33)
- Place of birth: Karaj, Iran
- Height: 1.85 m (6 ft 1 in)
- Position: Forward

Team information
- Current team: Shahin Bushehr
- Number: 10

Youth career
- 2011–2014: Saipa

Senior career*
Years	Team	Apps	(Gls)
2013–2017	Saipa	4	(0)
2016	→ Padideh (loan)	1	(0)
2017–2018	Malavan	0	(0)
2018–	Shahin Bushehr	0	(0)

International career^{‡}
2015–	Iran U23	0	(0)
- * Club domestic league appearances and goals as of 19 February 2015 ‡ National team caps and goals as of 23 June 2015

Bahman Salari (Shahram Salari) (Persian: بهمن سالاری( شهرام سالاری)); is an Iranian football forward who plays for Shahin Bushehr in the Iran Pro League.

== Club career ==
=== Saipa ===
He started his career with Saipa from the youth level. In July 2013 he joined the first team by Engin Firat. He made his debut for Saipa on 6 April 2014 against Fajr Sepasi as a substitute.

== Club career statistics ==
As of 19 February 2015.

Club	Division	Season	League		Hazfi Cup		Asia		Total	
Club	Division	Season	Apps	Goals	Apps	Goals	Apps	Goals	Apps	Goals
Saipa	Pro League	2013–14	1	0	0	0	–	–	1	0
Saipa	Pro League	2014–15	3	0	1	1	–	–	4	1
Saipa	Pro League	2015–16	0	0	1	0	–	–	1	0
Padideh	Pro League	2015–16	0	0	0	0	–	–	0	0
Career totals			4	0	2	1	0	0	6	1

== Honours ==
=== Individual ===
- Hazfi Cup top scorer: 2019–20
