= Alireza Monazzemi =

Iranian footballer (born 2002)

Personal information
- Date of birth: 14 December 2002 (age 23)
- Place of birth: Khorramshahr, Iran
- Height: 1.80 m (5 ft 11 in)
- Position: Forward

Team information
- Current team: Eskilsminne IF

Senior career*
Years	Team	Apps	(Gls)
2019–2021	Zob Ahan	19	(1)
2021–2022	Aluminium Arak	8	(0)
2022	Nassaji	1	(0)
2022–2023	Naft M.I.S	0	(0)
2026–	Eskilsminne IF	0	(0)

International career^{‡}
2019	Iran U19	3	(2)
- * Club domestic league appearances and goals as of 16 November 2026 ‡ National team caps and goals as of 10 November 2019

Alireza Monazzemi (Persian: علیرضا منظمی; born 14 December 2002) is an Iranian footballer who plays as a midfielder for Swedish side Eskilsminne IF.

== Club career ==
=== Zob Ahan ===
He made his debut for Zob Ahan in 16th fixtures of 2018–19 Iran Pro League against Nassaji Mazandaran while he substituted in for Amir Arsalan Motahari.
