= Eskilsminne IF =

Swedish football club

- Full name: Eskilsminne Idrottsförening
- Nickname: EIF
- Founded: 1928
- Ground: Harlyckans IP; Helsingborg; Sweden
- Chairman: Jes Mou Jessen
- Manager: Mattias Lindström
- League: Ettan Södra
- 2025: Ettan Södra, 10th
Home colours

Eskilsminne IF is a Swedish football club located in Helsingborg in Skåne County, playing in Division 1 Södra, the third tier in the Swedish football league system.

Eskilsminne's team colours are yellow and blue striped, which is an inheritance from Stattena who played in the best tier, Allsvenskan, with derbies against Helsingborgs IF. The original club colours are light and dark purple-striped shirt and white shorts.

== Background ==
Eskilsminne Idrottsförening is a football club from the district of Eskilsminne in Helsingborg and was founded on 18 May 1928. The club runs around 50 teams and has between 1200 and 1300 members, making it the largest youth organisation in Scania. Since 1968 the club has organised the Eskilscupen on an annual basis, which is one of the oldest and largest tournaments in youth football. The club also provides an annual football school for children between five and eight years, with an emphasis on fun and fellowship. Eskilsminne IF received the 2005 award for "Best sports for children and youth" from the Skånska idrottsförbundet (Scanian Sports Association).

Since their foundation Eskilsminne IF has participated mainly in the middle and lower divisions of the Swedish football league system. The club currently plays in Division 2 Västra Götaland, which is the fourth tier of Swedish football. They play their home matches at the Harlyckans IP in Helsingborg.

Eskilsminne IF are affiliated to Skånes Fotbollförbund.

== Recent history ==
In recent seasons Eskilsminne IF have competed in the following divisions:

1999 – Division 5 Skåne Nordvästra
2000 – Division 5 Skåne Västra
2001 – Division 6 Skåne Nordvästra A
2002 – Division 5 Skåne Nordvästra
2003 – Division 5 Skåne nordvästra B
2004 – Division 5 Skåne nordvästra A
2005 – Division 5 Skåne nordvästra
2006 – Division 5 Skåne västra
2007 – Division 5 Skåne nordvästra
2008 – Division 5 Skåne västra
2009 – Division 4 Skåne västra
2010 – Division 3 sydvästra Götaland
2011 – Division 3 sydvästra Götaland
2012 – Division 2 Södra Götaland
2013 – Division 2 Västra Götaland
2014 – Division 2 Västra Götaland
2015 – Division 1 Södra
2016 – Division 2 Västra Götaland
2017 – Division 2 Västra Götaland
2018 – Division 1 Södra
2019 – Division 1 Södra
2020 – Division 1 Södra

== Players ==
=== First-team squad ===
As of 1 September 2026

Note: Flags indicate national team as defined under FIFA eligibility rules; some limited exceptions apply. Players may hold more than one non-FIFA nationality.

No.	Pos.	Nation	Player
1	GK	SWE	Hampus Pauli
2	DF	SWE	Egon Kurtulus
3	MF	SWE	William Nilsson
4	DF	SWE	Leo Frigell Jansson
5	DF	SWE	Viggo Andersson
6	MF	SWE	Christian Ljungberg
7	MF	SWE	Lucas Ohlander
8	DF	SWE	Hugo Lindahl
9	FW	SWE	André Gustafson
10	MF	SWE	Teddy Bermudez
11	FW	SWE	Hampus Stoltz
14	FW	SWE	Casper Ljung Hofvendahl (on loan from Helsingborg)
15	MF	SWE	Henrik Bengtsson

No.	Pos.	Nation	Player
16	MF	SWE	Melvin Larsson
17	MF	SWE	Isaac Johnsson
18	FW	SWE	Elliot Hintsa
19	DF	SWE	William Westerlund (on loan from Helsingborg)
21	DF	SWE	Axel Sjöberg
26	FW	SWE	Max Eriksson
30	DF	SWE	Gustav Pettersson
31	MF	SWE	Henrik Norrby
33	FW	IRI	Alireza Monazzemi
40	GK	SWE	Ian Pettersson
98	FW	SWE	Christian Stark (on loan from Landskrona BoIS)
99	MF	SWE	Casper Seger

== Attendances ==
From 2008 to 2018, Eskilsminne IF have had the following average attendances:

Season	Average attendance	Division / Section	Level
2008	Not available	Div 5 Skåne västra	Tier 7
2009	250	Div 4 Skåne västra	Tier 6
2010	216	Div 3 Sydvästra Götaland	Tier 5
2011	276	Div 3 Sydvästra Götaland	Tier 5
2012	437	Div 2 Södra Götaland	Tier 4
2013	Not available	Div 2 Västra Götaland	Tier 4
2014	181	Div 2 Västra Götaland	Tier 4
2015	714	Div 1 Södra	Tier 3
2016	Not available	Div 2 Västra Götaland	Tier 4
2017	385	Div 2 Västra Götaland	Tier 4
2018		Div 1 Södra	Tier 3

* Attendances are provided in the Publikliga sections of the Svenska Fotbollförbundet website.
