= Reza Asadi =

Iranian footballer

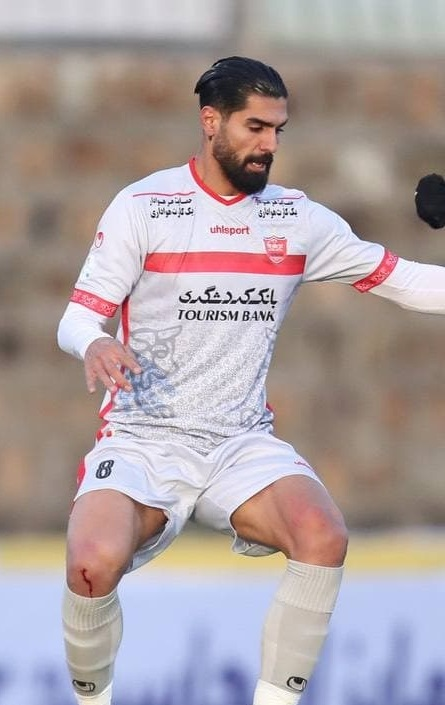
- Asadi playing for Persepolis in 2021

Personal information
- Date of birth: 17 January 1996 (age 30)
- Place of birth: Gorgan, Iran
- Height: 1.90 m (6 ft 3 in)
- Positions: Striker; defender; midfielder

Team information
- Current team: Buriram United
- Number: 4

Youth career
- 2013–2015: Sepahan

Senior career*
Years	Team	Apps	(Gls)
2015–2016	Sepahan	0	(0)
2016–2017	Naft Tehran	14	(3)
2017–2019	Saipa	52	(7)
2019–2020	Tractor	26	(5)
2020–2021	St. Pölten	6	(0)
2021–2022	Persepolis	23	(4)
2022–2023	Tractor	28	(11)
2023–2025	Sepahan	46	(13)
2025–2026	Gol Gohar	18	(2)
2026–	Buriram United	0	(0)

International career^{‡}
2013–2015	Iran U20	9	(5)
2023–	Iran	10	(1)
Medal record
Representing Iran
CAFA Nations Cup
Winner	2023 Kyrgyzstan – Uzbekistan	Team
- * Club domestic league appearances and goals as of 20 February 2026 ‡ National team caps and goals as of 7 February 2024

Reza Asadi (Persian: رضا اسدی; born January 17, 1996) is an Iranian Football player who currently plays for Buriram United in the Thai League and the Iran national football team.

== Club career ==
=== SKN St. Pölten ===
On 5 October 2020, Asadi signed a two-year contract with Austrian Bundesliga club St. Pölten.

=== Persepolis ===
On 27 August 2021, Asadi signed a one-year contract with Persian Gulf Pro League champions Persepolis.

== International career ==
He made his senior debut against Russia on 23 March 2023 in a friendly match.

== Personal life ==
During the Mahsa Amini protests, Asadi supported fellow footballer Amir Reza Nasr Azadani, who was jailed as a result of the protests, by posting a picture of the latter with calls for the authorities to not execute Azadani.

== Career statistics ==
As of 20 February 2026

Appearances and goals by club, season and competition
Club	Season	League			National Cup		Continental		Other		Total	
Club	Season	Division	Apps	Goals	Apps	Goals	Apps	Goals	Apps	Goals	Apps	Goals
Sepahan	2015–16	Pro League	0	0	0	0	0	0	—		0	0
Sepahan	Total		0	0	0	0	0	0	—		0	0
Naft Tehran	2016–17	Pro League	14	3	5	1	—		—		19	4
Naft Tehran	Total		14	3	5	1	—		—		19	4
Saipa	2017–18	Pro League	29	2	1	0	—		—		30	2
Saipa	2018–19	Pro League	23	5	2	0	2	0	—		27	5
Saipa	Total		52	7	3	0	2	0	—		57	7
Tractor	2019–20	Pro League	26	5	3	1	—		—		29	6
Tractor	Total		26	5	3	1	—		—		29	6
St. Pölten	2020–21	Austrian Bundesliga	6	0	0	0	—		2	0	8	0
St. Pölten	Total		6	0	0	0	—		2	0	8	0
Persepolis	2021–22	Pro League	23	4	2	0	2	0	1	0	28	4
Persepolis	Total		23	4	2	0	2	0	1	0	28	4
Tractor	2022–23	Pro League	28	11	1	1	—		—		29	12
Tractor	Total		28	11	1	1	—		—		29	12
Sepahan	2023–24	Pro League	24	10	3	1	7	2	—		34	13
Sepahan	2024–25	Pro League	22	3	2	0	3	0	1	0	28	3
Sepahan	Total		46	13	5	1	10	2	1	0	62	16
Gol Gohar	2025–26	Pro League	18	2	1	1	–		–		19	3
Career total			213	45	20	5	14	2	4	0	251	52

== National Statistics ==
=== International ===
As of match played 7 February 2024

Appearances and goals by national team and year
National team	Year	Apps	Goals
Iran
Iran	2023	6	1
Iran	2024	4	0
Total		10	1

No.	Date	Venue	Opponent	Score	Result	Competition
1	13 June 2023	Dolen Omurzakov Stadium, Bishkek, Kyrgyzstan	Afghanistan	6–1	6–1	2023 CAFA Nations Cup

== Honours ==
Naft Tehran

- Hazfi Cup (1): 2016–17

Tractor

- Hazfi Cup (1): 2019–20

Sepahan

- Iranian Hazfi Cup: 2023–24
- Iranian Super Cup: 2024

Iran

- CAFA Nations Cup: 2023
