= Ayoub Zolfagari =

Iranian footballer and manager

Personal information
- Full name: Ayoub Zolfagari Shotorban
- Date of birth: 22 February 1959 (age 67)
- Place of birth: Tabriz, Iran

Team information
- Current team: Tractor (Technical manager)

Senior career*
Years	Team	Apps	(Gls)
1974–1991	Tractor		

Managerial career
- Machine Sazi
- 2015–: Tractor (Technical manager)
- * Club domestic league appearances and goals

Ayoub Zolfagari (Persian: ايوب ذوالفقاري, born 1959 in Tabriz, Iran) is a retired Iranian professional football player and manager. He played all of his professional career for Tractor.
