= Akbar Imani =

Iranian footballer

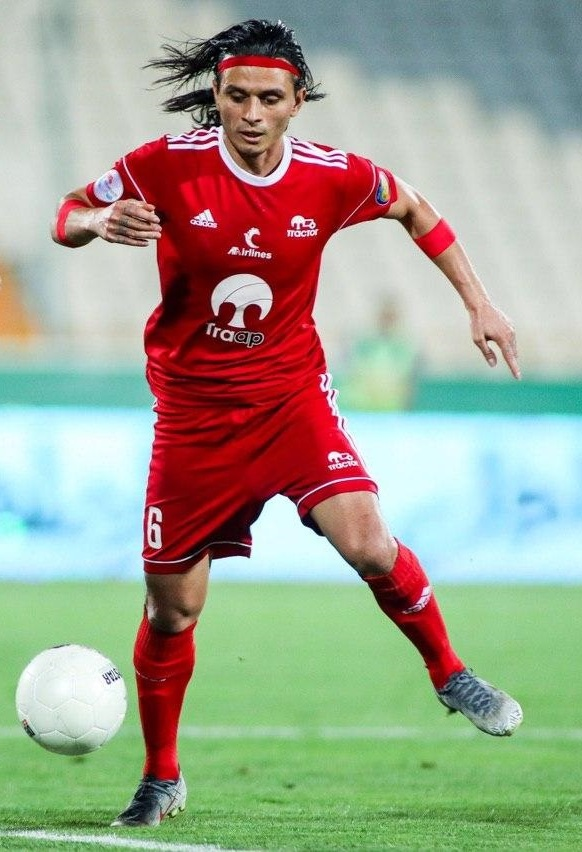
- Imani in 2020

Personal information
- Full name: Akbar Imani Ghareh Aghaj Sofla
- Date of birth: 21 March 1992 (age 34)
- Place of birth: Parsabad, Ardabil, Iran
- Height: 1.81 m (5 ft 11 in)
- Position: Defensive midfielder

Youth career
- 2005–2010: Sepahan

Senior career*
Years	Team	Apps	(Gls)
2010–2014	Sepahan	7	(0)
2013–2014	→ Zob Ahan (loan)	21	(0)
2014–2015	Zob Ahan	17	(2)
2015–2017	Foolad	22	(1)
2017–2018	Padideh	25	(2)
2018	Zob Ahan	6	(0)
2018	Sanat Naft	14	(2)
2019–2023	Tractor	82	(3)
2022–2023	→ Malavan (loan)	3	(0)

International career
2007–2009	Iran U17	11	(1)
2010	Iran U20	3	(0)
2012–2015	Iran U22	5	(0)
2017	Iran	3	(0)
- * Club domestic league appearances and goals

Akbar Imani ghareh Aghaj Sofla (born 21 March 1992), also known as Akbar Imani (Persian: اکبر ایمانی), is an Iranian former footballer who played as a midfielder.

== Club career ==
He joined Sepahan in summer of 2010 and won the league in his first season. He was loaned out to Zob Ahan for the 2013–14 season and made 21 league appearances. At the end of the season, Zob Ahan completed his permanent transfer, as he signed a five-year contract with the club.

=== Club career statistics ===
As of 22 December 2017

Club performance			League		Cup		Continental		Total	
Season	Club	League	Apps	Goals	Apps	Goals	Apps	Goals	Apps	Goals
Iran			League		Hazfi Cup		Asia		Total	
2010–11	Sepahan	Pro League	1	0			1	0	2	0
2011–12	Sepahan	Pro League	6	0	0	0	0	0	6	0
2012–13	Sepahan	Pro League	0	0	1	0	1	0	2	0
2013–14	→ Zob Ahan	Pro League	21	0	1	0	–	–	22	0
2014–15	Zob Ahan	Pro League	17	2	4	1	–	–	21	3
2015–16	Foolad	Pro League	19	1	2	0	–	–	21	1
2016–17	Foolad	Pro League	3	0	–	–	–	–	3	0
2016–17	Padideh	Pro League	11	2	–	–	–	–	11	2
2017–18	Padideh	Pro League	14	0	1	0	–	–	15	0
2017–18	Zob Ahan	Pro League	6	0	–	–	3	0	9	0
2018–19	Sanat Naft Abadan	Pro League	14	2	3	0	—		17	2
2018–19	Tractor	Pro League	14	1	0	0	—		14	1
2019–20	Tractor	Pro League	24	2	5	1	—		29	3
2020–21	Tractor	Pro League	13	0	0	0	0	0	13	0
Career total			163	10	17	2	5	0	185	12

- Assist Goals

Season	Team	Assists
10–11	Sepahan	0
11–12	Sepahan	0
12–13	Sepahan	0
13–14	Zob Ahan	1

== National team ==
He made his debut against Togo national football team on 5 October 2017.

== Honours ==
=== Club ===
Sepahan

- Iran Pro League (2): 2010–11, 2011–12
- Hazfi Cup (1): 2012–13

Zob Ahan

- Hazfi Cup (1): 2014–15

Tractor

- Hazfi Cup (1): 2019–20

Iran U-17

- AFC U-16 Championship (1): 2008
