= Mohammad Reza Khanzadeh =

Iranian footballer

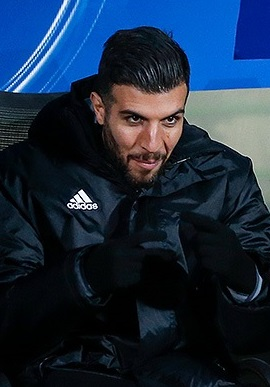
- Khanzadeh with Iran in 2018

Personal information
- Full name: Mohammad Reza Khanzadeh Darabi
- Date of birth: 11 May 1991 (age 35)
- Place of birth: Tehran, Iran
- Height: 1.88 m (6 ft 2 in)
- Position: Centre-back

Youth career
- –2009: Rah Ahan

Senior career*
Years	Team	Apps	(Gls)
2009–2012	Rah Ahan	9	(0)
2012–2015	Persepolis	33	(0)
2013–2014	→ Zob Ahan (loan)	15	(0)
2015–2016	Foolad	11	(0)
2016–2017	Siah Jamegan	20	(1)
2017–2018	Padideh	25	(4)
2018–2019	Al Ahli	13	(0)
2019–2021	Tractor	39	(3)
2021–2022	Gol Gohar Sirjan	10	(0)
2022–2023	Bashundhara Kings	10	(0)
2023	Malavan	1	(0)
2023	Sanat Naft	5	(0)

International career^{‡}
2006–2008	Iran U17	7	(3)
2008–2011	Iran U20	9	(2)
2011–2014	Iran U23	11	(2)
2012–2018	Iran	13	(1)
- * Club domestic league appearances and goals as of 2 June 2023 ‡ National team caps and goals as of 24 December 2018

Mohammad Reza Khanzadeh (Persian: محمدرضا خانزاده; born 11 May 1991) is an Iranian former professional footballer who played as a defender.

== Career ==
=== Rah Ahan ===
In 2009, Khanzadeh joined the Rah Ahan first team. Under the guidance of Ali Daei, Khanzadeh broke into the first team lineup late on in the season. He played in nine games, starting in eight and receiving two yellow cards.

=== Persepolis ===
He signed a three-years contract with Persepolis on 2 June 2012. He made his debut for The Reds on 16 September 2012 while he used as a substitute against Naft Tehran. After playing good games for his side, fans called him Persepolis' Raphaël Varane.

=== Loan to Zob Ahan ===
He was loaned to Zob Ahan until the end of 2013–14 season on 18 November 2013. He made 15 league appearances for Zob Ahan before returning to Persepolis.

=== Return to Persepolis ===
Khanzadeh returned to Persepolis before the start of 2014–15 season after spending six months at Zob Ahan. On 22 April 2015 Khanzadeh and several team-mates were involved in an altercation with a Persepolis fan in Doha after Persepolis' 3–0 loss to Lekhwiya in the 2015 AFC Champions League. On 28 April 2015, the Iranian Football Disciplinary Committee banned Khanzadeh from competing in any competitive matches in Iran for nine months, but he was allowed to continue to train with Persepolis.

=== Foolad & Siah Jamegan ===
Khanzadeh joined to Foolad before the start of 2015–16 season and after a season was sold to Siah Jamegan.

=== Padideh ===
Khanzadeh signed a two-years contract with Padideh before the start of 2017–18. He scored 4 goals during his first season on the team.

== International career ==
=== Youth ===
He was called to the Iran U23 team for AFC U-22 Asian Cup qualification by coach Alireza Mansourian. He named in Iran U23 final list for Incheon 2014.

=== Senior ===
He was called up by Carlos Queiroz for the Team Meli training camp in Turkey and the match against Albania in May 2012; however, he did not play in the match. He was selected in Iran's 30-man provisional squad for the 2014 FIFA World Cup by Queiroz. He was a stand-by player for Team Melli in the tournament. Khanzadeh was not selected in Iran's final squad for 2015 AFC Asian Cup. However, he was subsequently named as the replacement for the injured Hashem Beikzadeh. In May 2018, he was named in Iran's preliminary squad for the 2018 FIFA World Cup in Russia.

== Career statistics ==
As of 9 June 2019

Club	Division	Season	League		Cup		Asia		Total	
Club	Division	Season	Apps	Goals	Apps	Goals	Apps	Goals	Apps	Goals
Rah Ahan	Pro League	2009–10	0	0	0	0	—		0	0
Rah Ahan	Pro League	2010–11	0	0	0	0	—		0	0
Rah Ahan	Pro League	2011–12	9	0	0	0	—		9	0
Persepolis	Pro League	2012–13	12	0	2	0	—		14	0
Persepolis	Pro League	2013–14	4	0	0	0	—		4	0
Zob Ahan	Pro League	2013–14	15	0	1	0	—		16	0
Persepolis	Pro League	2014–15	17	0	3	0	3	0	23	0
Foolad	Pro League	2015–16	11	0	1	0	—		12	0
Siah Jamegan	Pro League	2016–17	20	1	0	0	—		20	1
Padideh	Pro League	2017–18	25	4	1	0	—		26	4
Al Ahli	Stars League	2018–19	13	0	0	0	—		13	0
Tractor	Pro League	2019–20	27	0	4	2	—		30	2
Tractor	Pro League	2020–21	6	0	0	0	0	0	6	0
Career total			161	5	12	2	3	0	176	7

=== International ===
Statistics accurate as of match played 24 December 2018.

Iran
Year	Apps	Goals
2012	3	0
2013	1	0
2014	3	0
2015	0	0
2016	0	0
2017	0	0
2018	6	1
Total	13	1

=== International goals ===
Scores and results list Iran's goal tally first.

No	Date	Venue	Opponent	Score	Result	Competition
1.	17 March 2018	Azadi Stadium, Tehran, Iran	Sierra Leone	1–0	4–0	Friendly

== Honours ==
Persepolis

- Hazfi Cup runner-up: 2012–13

Tractor

- Hazfi Cup: 2019–20
- Iranian Super Cup runner-up: 2020

Bashundhara Kings

- Bangladesh Premier League: 2022–23
- Independence Cup: 2022–23
- Federation Cup third place: 2022–23
