= Willyan Mimbela =

Peruvian footballer (born 1992)

Personal information
- Full name: Willyan Junior Mimbela Cáceres
- Date of birth: 8 October 1992 (age 34)
- Place of birth: Lima, Peru
- Height: 1.70 m (5 ft 7 in)
- Positions: Striker; attacking midfielder

Team information
- Current team: Carlos A. Mannucci
- Number: 23

Senior career*
| Years | Team | Apps | (Gls) |
| 2011 | Universitario de Deportes | 9 | (0) |
| 2012 | Sport Club Internacional | 0 | (0) |
| 2013 | Sport Huancayo | 39 | (6) |
| 2013-2014 | Sporting Cristal | 7 | (0) |
| 2014 | Nacional Madeira | 0 | (0) |
| 2015-2016 | Alianza Lima | 46 | (7) |
| 2017 | Ayacucho FC | 34 | (12) |
| 2018–2019 | Unión Comercio | 54 | (17) |
| 2019–2020 | Tractor | 16 | (1) |
| 2020 | Cusco FC | 11 | (0) |
| 2021 | Sport Boys | 4 | (0) |
| 2021 | Binacional | 10 | (1) |
| 2022 | Unión Huaral | 9 | (0) |
| 2022-2023 | Asociación Deportiva Tarma | 42 | (6) |
| 2024- | Carlos A. Mannucci | 9 | (0) |
- * Club domestic league appearances and goals as of 29 October 2023

Willyan Junior Mimbela Cáceres (born 15 May 1992) is a Peruvian footballer who plays for Carlos A. Mannucci.
