= Saeid Mehri =

Iranian footballer (born 1998)

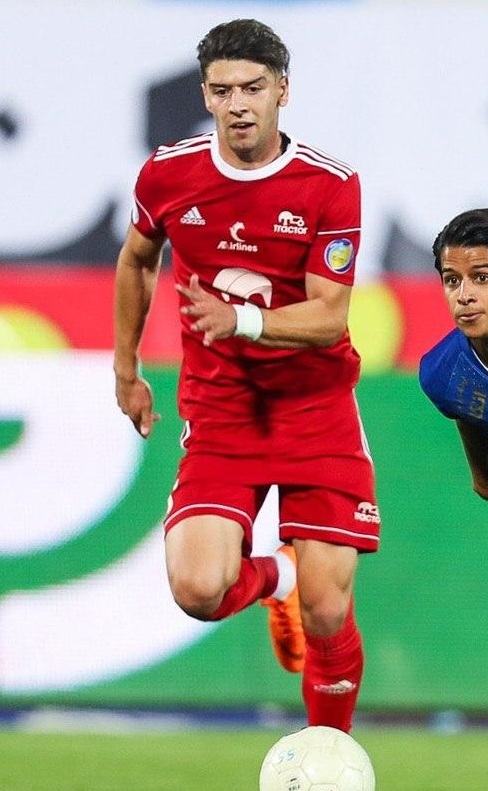
- Mehri in 2020

Personal information
- Full name: Saeid Mehri
- Date of birth: 9 February 1998 (age 28)
- Place of birth: Mianeh, Iran
- Height: 1.83 m (6 ft 0 in)
- Position: Central midfielder

Team information
- Current team: Fajr Sepasi
- Number: 4

Youth career
- 2013–2016: Shahrdari Tabriz

Senior career*
Years	Team	Apps	(Gls)
2016–2019	Machine Sazi	46	(1)
2019–2021	Tractor	33	(0)
2021–2024	Esteghlal	56	(1)
2024	APOEL	10	(0)
2024–2025	Persepolis	17	(0)
2026	Tractor	0	(0)
2026	→ Mes Rafasanjan (loan)	7	(0)
2026–	Fajr Sepasi	4	(1)

International career^{‡}
2023–	Iran	1	(0)
Medal record
Representing Iran
CAFA Nations Cup
Winner	2023 Kyrgyzstan – Uzbekistan	Team
- * Club domestic league appearances and goals as of 1 May 2025 ‡ National team caps and goals as of 13 June 2023

Saeid Mehri (Persian: سعید مهری; born February 9, 1998) is an Iranian professional footballer who plays as a midfielder for Persian Gulf Pro League club Fajr Sepasi and the Iran national team.

== Club career ==
=== Machine Sazi ===
On 5 September 2016, Mehri joined Machine Sazi as a young star.

=== Tractor ===
On 8 June 2019, Mehri joined Persian Gulf Pro League side Tractor.

=== Esteghlal ===
On 28 February 2021, Mehri joined Esteghal Tehran with a 2.5 Year contract.

He was one of the key players of the team and played in 56 league matches.

=== APOEL FC ===
On 29 January 2024, Mehri joined Cypriot First Division club APOEL.

In his first season with APOEL, Mehri also won the championship title in the Cyprus League. Although he was one of the most effective players in the team, he preferred to leave the team after receiving better financial offers.

=== Persepolis ===
On 9 September 2024, Mehri joined Persian Gulf Pro League champions Persepolis.

== International career ==
He made his debut on 13 June 2023.

== Style of play ==
Mehri is effective in defense and attack and can easily disrupt the flow of the opposing team's play. Accuracy in positioning on the field is also one of the characteristics of his playing style.

== Personal life ==
Mehri was born on 9 February 1998 in Tabriz, Iran, and was interested in football since childhood.

== Career statistics ==
=== Club ===
As of 1 May 2025

Club	Season	League			Cup		Continental		Other		Total	
Club	Season	Division	Apps	Goals	Apps	Goals	Apps	Goals	Apps	Goals	Apps	Goals
Machine Sazi	2016–17	Pro League	5	0	2	0	—		—		7	0
Machine Sazi	2017–18	Pro League	3	2	1	0	—		—		4	2
Machine Sazi	2018–19	Pro League	20	0	3	0	—		—		25	0
Machine Sazi	Total		28	2	6	0	0	0	0	0	34	2
Tractor	2019–20	Pro League	20	0	5	2	—		—		25	2
Tractor	2020–21	Pro League	13	0	0	0	0	0	—		13	0
Tractor	Total		33	0	5	2	0	0	0	0	38	2
Esteghlal	2020–21	Persian Gulf Pro League	6	0	0	0	4	0	—		10	0
Esteghlal	2021–22	Persian Gulf Pro League	12	0	1	0	0	0	—		13	0
Esteghlal	2022–23	Persian Gulf Pro League	27	1	4	1	—		1	0	32	2
Esteghlal	2023–24	Persian Gulf Pro League	11	0	0	0	—		—		11	0
Esteghlal	Total		56	1	5	1	4	0	1	0	66	2
APOEL	2023–24	Cypriot First Division	10	0	0	0	–		–		10	0
Persepolis	2024–25	Pro League	17	0	2	0	4	0	0	0	23	0
Career total			144	3	18	3	8	0	1	0	171	6

== Honours ==
Esteghlal

- Persian Gulf Pro League: 2021–22
- Hazfi Cup runner-up: 2020–21
- Iranian Super Cup: 2022

Tractor

- Hazfi Cup: 2019–20

APOEL

- Cypriot First Division: 2023–24

Iran

- CAFA Nations Cup: 2023
