= Bahram Rashidi Farrokhi =

Iranian Football Forward

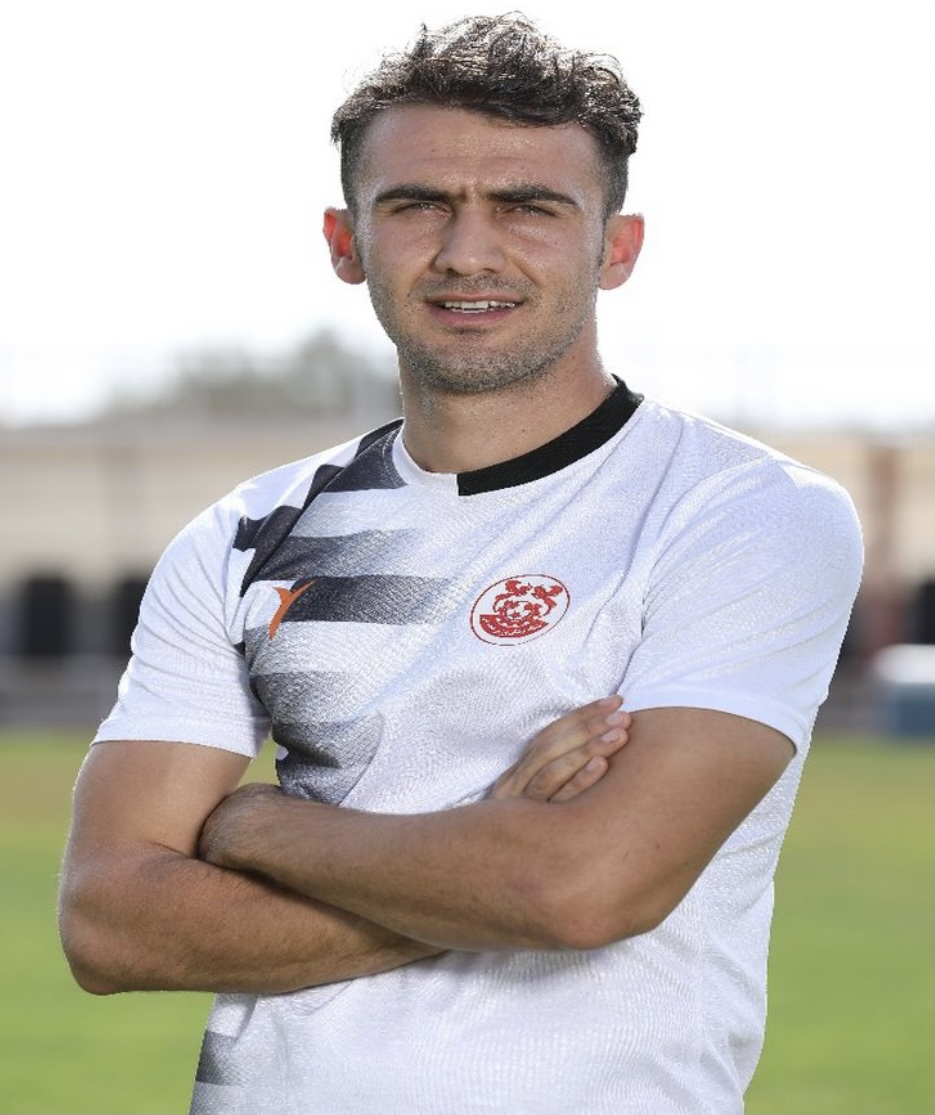

Personal information
- Full name: Bahram Rashidi Farrokhi
- Date of birth: May 11, 1992 (age 34)
- Place of birth: Kerman, Iran
- Height: 1.88 m (6 ft 2 in)
- Position: Forward

Team information
- Current team: Mes Rafsanjan

Senior career*
Years	Team	Apps	(Gls)
2010–2012	Mes Sarcheshme		
2012–2016	Mes Rafsanjan	42	(13)
2016–2017	Foolad	6	(0)
2017–	Mes Rafsanjan	0	(0)
- * Club domestic league appearances and goals as of 23 October 2016

Bahram Rashidi Farrokhi is an Iranian football forward who plays for Foolad in the Persian Gulf Pro League.
