= Mohammad Reza Azadi =

Iranian footballer (born 1999)

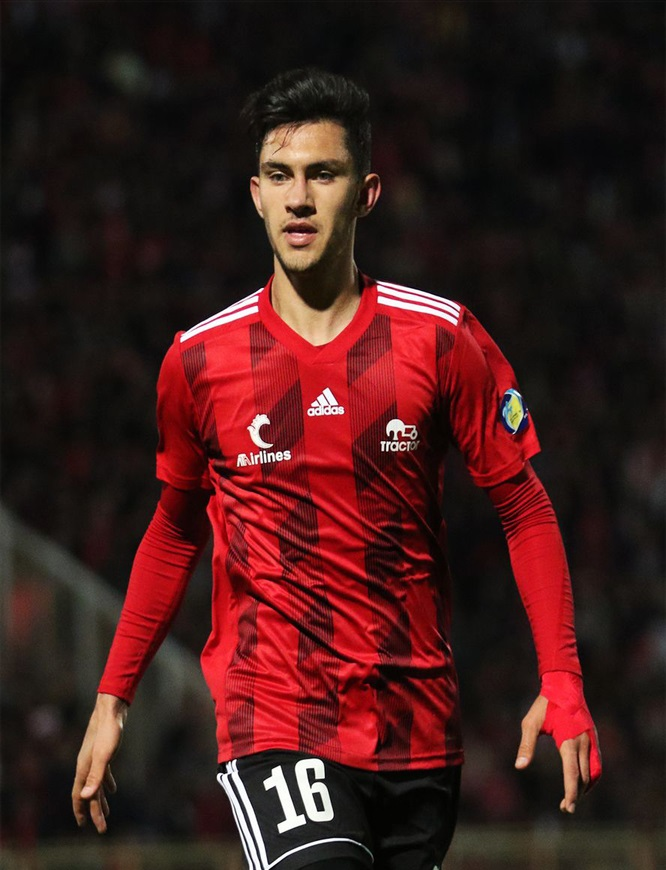
- Azadi with Tractor in 2019

Personal information
- Date of birth: 7 December 1999 (age 26)
- Place of birth: Naqadeh, Iran
- Height: 1.88 m (6 ft 2 in)
- Position: Forward

Team information
- Current team: Esteghlal
- Number: 9

Youth career
- 2014–2017: Tractor

Senior career*
Years	Team	Apps	(Gls)
2017–2020	Tractor	51	(4)
2020–2021	Panetolikos	10	(0)
2021–2022	Esteghlal	2	(0)
2022–2023	Aluminium Arak	41	(8)
2023–2024	Nassaji Mazandaran	27	(8)
2024–2025	Al Orooba	12	(3)
2025–	Esteghlal	32	(2)

International career^{‡}
2016–2021	Iran U23	11	(6)
2024	Iran	1	(0)
- * Club domestic league appearances and goals as of 7 November 2026 ‡ National team caps and goals as of 21 March 2024

Mohammad Reza Azadi (Persian: محمدرضا آزادی; born 7 December 1999) is an Iranian professional footballer who plays as a forward for Persian Gulf Pro League club Esteghlal and the Iran national team.

== Club career ==
Azadi joined Tractor 2017 after spending the previous season in Panetolikos.

He joined Panetolikos on 24 October 2020, becoming the fourth Iranian player in Super League Greece.‌

== International career ==
Azadi made his debut for the senior Iran national team on 21 March 2024 in a World Cup qualifier against Turkmenistan.

=== International ===
As of match played 21 March 2024

Appearances and goals by national team and year
National team	Year	Apps	Goals
Iran
Iran	2024	1	0
Total		1	0

== Career statistics ==
=== Club ===
As of 7 November 2026

Club	Division	Season	League		National Cup		Continental		Other		Total	
Club	Division	Season	Apps	Goals	Apps	Goals	Apps	Goals	Apps	Goals	Apps	Goals
Tractor	Persian Gulf Pro League	2017–18	27	1	3	0	3	0	—		33	1
Tractor	Persian Gulf Pro League	2018–19	7	0	0	0	—		—		7	0
Tractor	Persian Gulf Pro League	2019–20	16	3	5	0	—		—		21	3
Tractor	Total		50	4	8	0	3	0	—		61	4
Panetolikos	Super League Greece	2020–21	10	0	2	0	—		1	0	13	0
Panetolikos	Total		10	0	2	0	—		1	0	13	0
Esteghlal	Persian Gulf Pro League	2021–22	2	0	1	0	0	0	—		3	0
Esteghlal	Persian Gulf Pro League	2024–25	11	1	3	1	4	1	—		18	3
Esteghlal	Persian Gulf Pro League	2025–26	15	0	2	0	3	0	1	0	21	0
Esteghlal	Persian Gulf Pro League	2026–27	6	1	0	0	1	0	—		7	1
Esteghlal	Total		34	2	6	1	8	1	1	0	49	4
Aluminium Arak	Persian Gulf Pro League	2021–22	12	1	3	2	—		—		15	3
Aluminium Arak	Persian Gulf Pro League	2022–23	29	7	2	1	—		—		31	8
Aluminium Arak	Total		41	8	5	3	—		—		46	11
Nassaji	Persian Gulf Pro League	2023–24	27	8	1	0	6	4	—		34	12
Nassaji	Total		27	8	1	0	6	4	—		34	12
Al Orooba	UAE Pro League	2024–25	12	3	2	0	0	0	1	0	15	3
Career total			174	25	24	4	17	5	3	0	218	34

== Honours ==
Tractor

- Hazfi Cup: 2019–20

Esteghlal

- Hazfi Cup: 2024–25
