= Amir Arsalan Motahari =

Iranian footballer

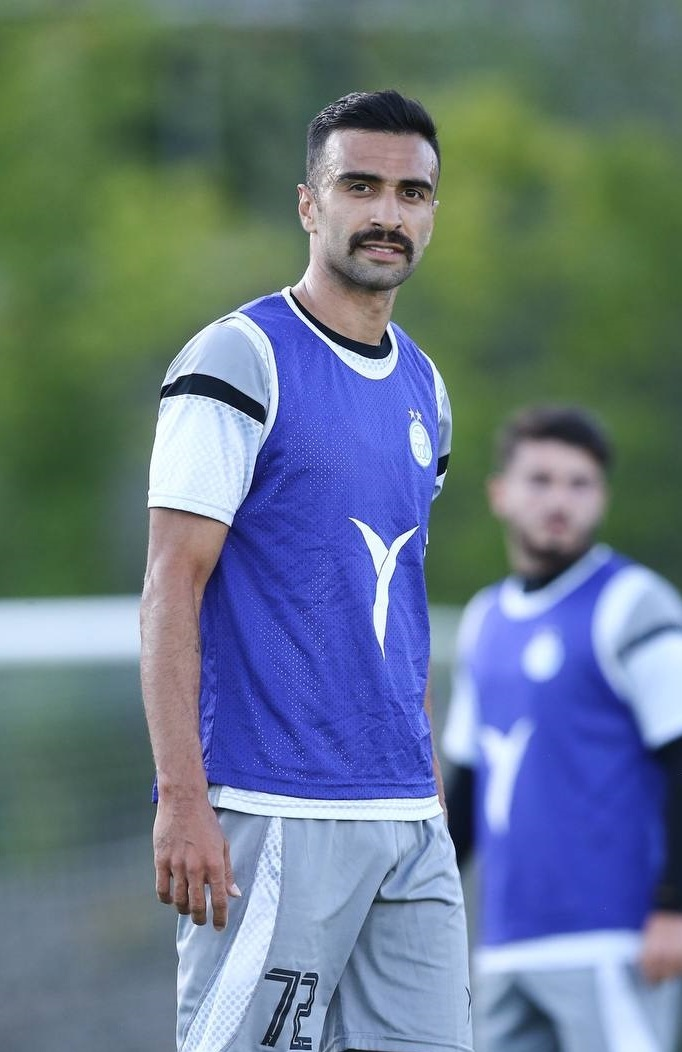
- Motahari in 2022

Personal information
- Date of birth: 10 March 1993 (age 33)
- Place of birth: Garmsar, Iran
- Height: 1.80 m (5 ft 11 in)
- Position: Forward

Team information
- Current team: Fajr Sepasi
- Number: 72

Youth career
- 2009–2011: Steel Azin
- 2011–2012: Damash Tehran
- 2012–2014: Moghavemat Tehran

Senior career*
Years	Team	Apps	(Gls)
2014–2017	Naft Tehran	80	(17)
2017–2018	Pars Jonoubi	9	(0)
2018	Tractor	12	(0)
2018–2019	Saham	0	(0)
2019–2020	Zob Ahan	25	(11)
2020–2024	Esteghlal	95	(28)
2024	Tractor	6	(0)
2025	Nirooye Zamini	11	(3)
2025–	Fajr Sepasi	12	(1)

International career
2011–2014	Iran U20	16	(9)
2014–2016	Iran U23	23	(14)
2023	Iran U23 (Wild Card)	5	(2)
- * Club domestic league appearances and goals as of 24 May 2024

Amir Arsalan Motahari (Persian: امیرارسلان مطهری; born 10 March 1993) is an Iranian professional footballer.

== Club career ==
=== Early years ===
He started his career with Steel Azin U19. He also played at Damash Tehran youth levels. Later he joined Moghavemat Tehran U21 and helped them to become champions in 2013–14 U21 Tehran Asia Vision Premier League.

=== Naft Tehran ===
He joined Naft Tehran on 26 May 2014 with a three-year contract. He made his debut against Rah Ahan on 7 August 2014, as a substitute for Hossein Ebrahimi. He also scored his first goal for Naft, in 1–1 draw against Gostaresh. On 18 March 2015, Motahari scored in Naft's 2–1 win against Al Shabab which was the club's first group stage victory in the AFC Champions League.

== Personal life ==
He was born on 10 March 1993, in the town of Garmsar, in the Semnan Province. His father's name is Ardalan Motahari. He was a lifetime supporter of Esteghlal FC and even joined them in the beginning of 2020.

== Club career statistics ==
As of 24 May 2024

Club	Division	Season	League		Hazfi Cup		Asia		Other		Total	
Club	Division	Season	Apps	Goals	Apps	Goals	Apps	Goals	Apps	Goals	Apps	Goals
Naft Tehran	Pro League	2014–15	26	8	1	0	11	3	—		38	11
Naft Tehran	Pro League	2015–16	23	2	1	0	1	0	—		25	2
Naft Tehran	Pro League	2016–17	26	4	5	3	—		—		31	7
Naft Tehran	Total		75	14	7	3	12	3	0	0	94	20
Pars Jonoubi Jam	Pro League	2017–18	9	0	1	0	—		—		10	0
Tractor	Pro League	2017–18	12	0	0	0	6	0	—		18	0
Saham	Oman Professional League	2018–19	0	0	0	0	—		—		0	0
Zob Ahan	Pro League	2018–19	13	6	0	0	7	4	—		20	10
Zob Ahan	Pro League	2019–20	12	5	2	0	2	0	—		16	5
Zob Ahan	Total		25	11	2	0	9	4	0	0	36	15
Esteghlal	Pro League	2019–20	11	5	2	1	7	4	—		20	10
Esteghlal	Pro League	2020–21	29	7	5	0	6	1	—		40	8
Esteghlal	Pro League	2021–22	25	3	2	1	—		—		27	4
Esteghlal	Pro League	2022–23	23	4	5	1	—		1	1	29	6
Esteghlal	Pro League	2023–24	7	1	0	0	—		—		7	1
Esteghlal	Total		95	20	14	3	13	5	1	1	123	29
Tractor	Pro League	2023–24	6	0	2	0	0	0	–		8	0
Career total			223	45	26	6	40	12	1	1	290	64

== International career ==
=== Youth ===
He was part of the Iran U-22 squad during the 2013 AFC U-22 Championship and made 2 appearances against Japan U-22 and Australia U-22.

He was invited to the Iran U-23 training camp by Nelo Vingada as preparation for the 2014 Asian Games. He was called into Iran's squad for the 2016 AFC U-23 Championship qualification. Motahari was named the best player of the 2015 WAFF U-23 Championship in October 2015 scoring three goals, including one in the final against Syria which Iran won 2–0. On 12 January 2016 Motahari scored Iran's first goal and assisted the second in their 2–0 victory against Syria in the first match of the 2016 AFC U-23 Championship.

=== Senior ===
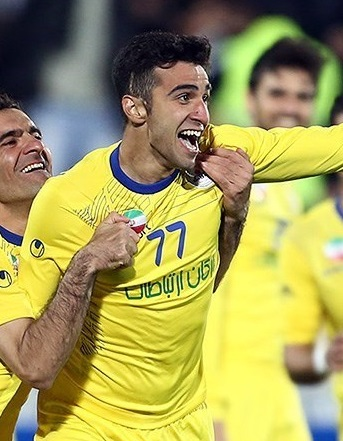
Motahari playing for Naft against Persepolis

Motahari was invited to the May 2015 Iran training camp by Carlos Queiroz.

== Honours ==
Naft Tehran

- Hazfi Cup: 2016–17

Esteghlal

- Iran Pro League: 2021–22
- Hazfi Cup runner-up: 2019–20, 2020–21
- Iranian Super Cup: 2022

Iran U23

- WAFF U-23 Championship : 2015

Individual

- WAFF U-23 Championship Best Player: 2015
- Persian Gulf Pro League Young Footballer of the Year: 2014–15
