= 2019–20 Hazfi Cup =

Tournament details
- Country: Iran
- Dates: 23 August 2019 – 3 September 2020
- Teams: 66

Final positions
- Champions: Tractor (2nd title)
- Runners-up: Esteghlal

Tournament statistics
- Matches played: 65
- Goals scored: 199 (3.06 per match)
- Top goal scorer: Bahman Salari (4 goals)

The 2019–20 Hazfi Cup was the 33rd season of the Iranian football knockout competition. The competition began in August 2019 and the final was played on September 3, 2020, which Tractor won for their 2nd title.

== Participating teams ==
A total of 86 teams (out of a possible total of 96 eligible teams) participated. The teams were divided into four main groups:

- 16 teams of the Persian Gulf Pro League: entering at the Round of 32.
- 18 teams of the Azadegan League: entering at the third round.
- 28 teams from the 2nd Division: entering at the second round.
- 24 teams (out of a possible total of 34 teams) from Provincial Leagues: entering from first round.

== Schedule ==
The schedule of the competition was as follows.

Stage	Round	Draw date	Matches dates
Preliminary stage	Preliminary round 1	17 August 2019	23 August 2019
Preliminary stage	Preliminary round 2	24 August 2019	31 August 2019
Preliminary stage	Preliminary round 3	1 September 2019	6–7 September 2019
Main Stage	Round of 32	16 September 2019	28–30 September 2019; 1 October 2019
Main Stage	Round of 16	3 October 2019	16–17 October 2019 26 November 2019
Main Stage	Quarter-finals	3 December 2019	23 December 2019
Main Stage	Semi-finals	11 August 2020	25–26 August 2020
Main Stage	Final	11 August 2020	3 September 2020

== First stage ==
=== First round ===
Number of teams per tier entering this round
Pro League (1)	1. division (2)	2. division (3)	Provincial Leagues (4)	Total
16 / 16	18 / 18	28 / 28	24 / 34	86 / 96

23 August 2019 1	Shahid Oraki Eslamshahr (4)	w/o	Parag Tehran (4)	Eslamshahr
17:00				Stadium: Imam Khomeini; Referee: Mehdi Ojaghi
Note: Parag withdrew

23 August 2019 1	Daryaye Harbadae Mahmoodabad (4)	2–1	Siman Semnan (4)	Mahmoud Abad
17:00	Masoud Fattah 38'; Mousa Hosseinzadeh 50'		Mohammad Hassan Nouhi 90' (P)	Stadium: Shahid Beheshti; Referee: Morteza Abedi

23 August 2019 1	Shayan Baneh (4)	3–2	Ra'd Mahalat Markazi (4)	Safari
17:00				Referee: Mohammad Amir Nejad

23 August 2019 1	Mehregan Dare Shahr Ilam (4)	w/o	Zob Felezat Hamedan (4)	Dehloran
17:15				Stadium: Takhti; Referee: Iman Shah Vali
Note: Zob Felezat withdrew

23 August 2019 1	Rezvani Isfahan (4)	2–0	Payam Dezpat Ardal (4)	Isfahan
17:00	Javad Kouravand; Mohsen Fathi			Stadium: Ararat; Referee: Reza Moradi

23 August 2019 1	Sohan Mohammad Qom (4)	w/o	Ettehad Qal'e Raeisi (4)	Qom
17:00				Stadium: Heydarian; Referee: Masoud Haghighi
Note: Sohan Mohammad withdrew

23 August 2019 1	Safir Novon Abyek (4)	1–2	Sardar Jangal (4)	Abyek
17:00				Stadium: Takhti; Referee: Enayat Qouchkhanlou

23 August 2019 1	Shahrdari Khodabande (4)	w/o	Shahrdari Bileh Savar (4)	Khodabandeh
17:00				Stadium: Shahid Fahmideh; Referee: Abdolhosein Bastan
Note: Shahrdari Bileh Savar withdrew

23 August 2019 1	Heyat Football Iranshahr (4)	w/o	Talaye Sorkh Qa'enat (4)	Iranshahr
16:30				Stadium: Shahid Chamran; Referee: Moein Izadi
Note: Talaye Sorkh Qa'enat withdrew

23 August 2019 1	Shahrdari Bardeskan (4)	2–1 (a.e.t.)	Shahrdari Rigan (4)	Bardeskan
16:30	Reza Jalali 60'; Omid Arman 110'		Mohammad Mohammadi	Stadium: Shahid Esmaeili; Referee: Seyed Abolfazl Hosseini

23 August 2019 1	Esteghlal Novin Mahshahr (4)	2–1	Siraf Kangan Boushehr (4)	Mahshahr
17:30	Easa Mousavi (2x)		Mohammad Mahdi Behrousi	Stadium: Shohada; Referee: Aghil Jahanbazi

23 August 2019 1	Oghab Shiraz (4)	w/o	Malavan Kish (4)	Shiraz
17:00				Stadium: Nirouye Havayi; Referee: Mojtaba Afra
Note: Oghab Shiraz wothrrew

=== Second round ===
Number of teams per tier entering this round
Pro League (1)	1. division (2)	2. division (3)	Provincial Leagues (4)	Total
16 / 16	18 / 18	13 / 28	12 / 34	74 / 96

Mes Novin Kerman, Shohadaye Razakan Karaj, Kheibar Khoram Abad : Bye to the next round

31 August 2019 2	Caspian Qazvin (3)	w/o	Shahrdari Khodabande (4)	Qazvin
17:00				Stadium: Sardar Azadegan; Referee: Mostafa Binesh
Note: Caspian Qazvin withdrew

31 August 2019 2	Ettehad Kamyaran (3)	8–1	Heyat Football Iranshahr (4)	Kamyaran
17:00	Sina Asadi 11'; Keyvan Marabi 20', 35', 62', 70'; Mohammad Khademi 45'; Hamid Ghaderi 80'; Belal Vakili 90'			Stadium: Azadi; Referee: Omid Jamshidi

31 August 2019 2	Sardar Jangal (4)	1–0	Shahid Ghandi Yazd (3)	Zarmikh
17:00	Arman Shakouri 67'			Stadium: Shohadaye Gourab; Referee: Shahab Mohammadi

31 August 2019 2	Ettehad Qal'e Raeisi (4)	0–6	Shahrdari Mahshahr (3)	Dehdasht
17:00			Reza Jabbari 25'; Ali Mohammad Cheraghi 45', 60', 75'; Sajjad Abbasi 66'; Amir Hossein Tahouni 90'	Stadium: Azadi; Referee: Iman Kahish

31 August 2019 2	Malavan Kish (4)	0–5	Esteghlal Molasani (3)	Kish
18:00			Ali Fateh (X3); Amin Hashemi; Mohammad Madmalisi	Stadium: Olympic; Referee: Enayat Qouchkanlou

31 August 2019 2	Moghavemat Tehran (3)	w/o	Esteghlal Novin Mahshahr (4)
17:00				Referee: Hossein Zamani
Note: Moghavemat withdrew

31 August 2019 2	PAS Hamedan (3)	2–1	Shahrdari Bardeskan (4)	Hamedan
17:00	Behzad Soltani 38'; Abolfazl Zomorodi 98'		?	Stadium: Haj Babayi; Referee: Masoud Haghighi

31 August 2019 2	Shahrdari Astara (3)	0–1	Daryaye Harbadeye Mahmoudabad (4)	Talesh
17:00			Masoud Fattah	Stadium: Pouriyaye Vali; Referee: Farhad Amini

31 August 2019 2	Sardar Bookan (3)	1–0	Shahid Oraki Eslamshahr (4)	Boukan
17:00	Majid Lotfi			Stadium: Khatam-ol-Anbiya; Referee: Mahdi Jabraeili

31 August 2019 2	Milad Mehr Iranian (3)	w/o	Rezvani Isfahan (4)
17:00				Referee: Hossein Hosseini
Note: Milad Mehr withdrew

31 August 2019 2	Mehregan Dare Shahr Ilam (4)	w/o	Shayan Baneh (4)	Ilam
17:00			Ataollah Pourmand; Reza Karami (X2)	Stadium: Edalat; Referee: Iman Shavali
Note: Shayan Baneh withdrew

=== Third round ===
Number of teams per tier entering this round
Pro League (1)	1. division (2)	2. division (3)	Provincial Leagues (4)	Total
16 / 16	13 / 18	8 / 28	6 / 34	43 / 96

Mes Kerman, Gol Reyhan Alborz, Khooshe Talaei Saveh, Nirooye Zamini, Baadraan Tehran : Bye to the next round

6 September 2019 3	Sepidrood (2)	w/o	Fajr Sepasi (2)	Rasht
17:00				Stadium: Sardar Jangal Stadium; Referee: Ali Asghar Momeni
Note: Sepidrood withdrew

6 September 2019 3	Esteghlal Novin Mahshahr (4)	3–0	Sardar Jangal (4)	Mahshahr
19:15	Mohammad Mohammadi 17'; Abbas Ghasemi 45', 54'			Stadium: Shohada; Referee: Hadi Ali Niafar

6 September 2019 3	Shohadaye Razakan Karaj (3)	5–0	Shahrdari Khodabande (4)	Karaj
17:00	Amir Hossein Salamat 22' (P); Shayan Gholami 43'; Mehrzad Haghighi 49'; Ebrahim Sagvand 69'; Sajjad Javadi 93'			Stadium: Enghelab; Referee: Mehdi Ojaghi

7 September 2019 3	Mes Novin Kerman (3)	w/o	Shahrdari Tabriz (2)	Kerman
17:30				Stadium: Imam Ali; Referee: Masoud Haghighi
Note: Shahrdari Tabriz withdrew

7 September 2019 3	Shahrdari Mahshahr (3)	2–1	Malavan (2)	Mahshahr
19:15	Oveys Kord Jahan 38' (P); Jahangir Asgari 78'		Saeid Hallafi 21'	Stadium: Shohada; Attendance: 0 Referee: Meysam Heydari

7 September 2019 3	Navad Urmia (2)	2–1 (a.e.t.)	Ettehad Kamyaran (3)	Urmia
17:00	Peyman Poursadeghi 14'; Farshad Asadi 103' (P)		Mehdi Sardari 90+4'	Stadium: Takhti; Referee: Nasser Jangi

7 September 2019 3	Sorkhpooshan Pakdasht (2)	0–0 (a.e.t.) (1–3 p)	Qashqai (2)	Eslamshahr
17:00				Stadium: Shohada; Referee: Shobeyr Behrouzi

7 September 2019 3	Damash Gilan (2)	4–0	Mehregan Dare Shahr Ilam (4)	Rasht
17:00	Meraj Pour Taghi 23'; Sina Shah Abbasi 49', 68'; Behtash Misaghian 70'			Stadium: Sardar Jangal Stadium; Referee: Amir Saman Soltani

7 September 2019 3	Rezvani Isfahan (4)	2–2 (a.e.t.) (4–5 p)	PAS Hamedan (3)	Isfahan
16:45	Masoud Ramezani 16'; Soroush Rafizadeh 115'		Milad Saeidi 66'; Javad Kouravand 110'	Stadium: Ararat; Attendance: 200; Referee: Iman Shaveli

7 September 2019 3	Esteghlal Molasani (3)	1–2	Kheibar Khoram Abad (3)	Ahvaz
19:00	? 78' (P)		Farzad Bahari 47' (P); Mehran Ahmadi 75'	Stadium: Takhti; Referee: Iman Kahish

7 September 2019 3	Daryaye Harbadeye Mahmoudabad (4)	0–2	Sardar Bookan (3)	Mahmoud Abad
16:45			Mostafa Karimi 12'; Amir Reza Bayat 24'	Stadium: Shahid Beheshti; Referee: Hamed Siri

== Second stage ==
=== Bracket ===
Fourth round (round of 32); 28 September 2019–1 October 2019
Nirooye Zamini	0
Navad Urmia	2
PAS Hamedan	1
Tractor	2
Pars Jonoubi Jam	1
Zob Ahan (a.e.t.)	2
Mes Kerman	1 (4)
Baadraan	1 (2)
Nassaji	0
Shahr Khodro	1
Gol Gohar	0
Naft Masjed Soleyman	1
Khooshe Talaei Saveh	3 (1)
Shahin Bushehr	3 (3)
Saipa	2
Damash Gilan	1
Sardar Bookan	1
Shahrdari Mahshahr (a.e.t.)	2
Esteghlal Novin Mahshahr	2
Mes Novin Kerman	1
Mashin Sazi	0
Persepolis	1
Qashqai	1
Sanat Naft	2
Gol Reyhan	1
Esteghlal (a.e.t.)	3
Fajr Sepasi	2 (3)
Foolad	2 (2)
Kheybar Khorramabad	0
Sepahan	3
Peykan	4
Shohadaye Razakan Karaj	0

Fifth round (round of 16); 16 October 2019–17 October 2019; 26 November 2019
Navad Urmia	1 (6)
Tractor	1 (7)
Zob Ahan	2
Mes Kerman	4
Shahr Khodro	0
Naft Masjed Soleyman	1
Shahin Bushehr	2
Saipa	0
Shahrdari Mahshahr	2
Esteghlal Novin Mahshahr	1
Persepolis	1
Sanat Naft	0
Esteghlal (a.e.t.)	3
Fajr Sepasi	0
Sepahan	2
Peykan	1

Sixth round (quarter-final); 23 December 2019; 19 February 2020; 10 August 2020
Tractor	4
Mes Kerman	1
Naft Masjed Soleyman (a.e.t.)	3
Shahin Bushehr	2
Shahrdari Mahshahr	0
Persepolis	2
Esteghlal	2
Sepahan	0

Semi-final; 25 August 2020–26 August 2020
Tractor	1
Naft Masjed Soleyman	0
Persepolis	2 (1)
Esteghlal	2 (4)

Final; 3 September 2020
Tractor	3
Esteghlal	2

=== Fourth round (round of 32) ===
The 16 teams from Iran Pro League entered the competition from the second stage.

Number of teams per tier entering this round
Pro League (1)	1. division (2)	2. division (3)	Provincial Leagues (4)	Total
16 / 16	9 / 18	6 / 28	1 / 34	32 / 96

28 September 2019 4	Mes Kerman (2)	1–1 (4–2 p)	Baadraan (2)	Kerman
15:00	Hossein Shanani 7'		Pouya Seif Panahi 31'	Stadium: Imam Ali; Referee: Saeed Vafapisheh
	Penalties
	Penalty scored Penalty missed		Penalty scored Penalty missed

29 September 2019 4	Saipa (1)	2–1	Damash Gilan (2)	Tehran
17:15	Mohammad Mehri (P) 28'; Amir Hossein Hosseinzadeh 90'		Meraj Poortaghi 75'	Stadium: PAS Ghavamin; Referee: Javad Rahimzadeh

29 September 2019 4	Qashqai (2)	1–2	Sanat Naft (1)	Shiraz
15:00	Saeid Zare 38'		Mohammad Ahl Shakhe 35', 60'	Stadium: Hafezieh; Referee: Hossein Zamani

29 September 2019 4	Nirooye Zamini (2)	0–2	Navad Urmia (2)	Tehran
15:30			Alireza Ghasemi 52'; Vahid Nemati 88'	Stadium: Ghadir; Referee: Mohammad Reza Akbarian

29 September 2019 4	PAS Hamedan (3)	1–2	Tractor (1)	Hamedan
15:30	Roohollah Soltani (P) 67'		Dejagah 14'; Azadi 41'	Stadium: Haji Babayi; Referee: Hassan Akrami

29 September 2019 4	Nassaji (1)	0–1	Shahr Khodro (1)	Qaemshahr
15:30			Akbar Sadeghi 71'	Stadium: Shahid Vatani; Referee: Bijan Heydari

29 September 2019 4	Gol Gohar (1)	0–1	Naft Masjed Soleyman (1)	Sirjan
16:20			Ahmad Aljabouri 88'	Stadium: Imam Ali; Referee: Payam Heydari

30 September 2019 4	Gol Reyhan (2)	1–3 (a.e.t.)	Esteghlal (1)	Karaj
18:15	Mohammad Papi 38'		Hamid Reza Divsalar (OG) 43'; Sajad Aghayi 93'; Farshid Esmaeili 113'	Stadium: Enghelab; Referee: Mehdi Seyed Ali

30 September 2019 4	Esteghlal Novin Mahshahr (4)	2–1	Mes Novin Kerman (3)	Mahshahr
16:00	Easa Mousavi 8'; Mohammad Mohammadi 66'		Hamid Rafiei 58'	Stadium: Shohada; Referee: Hadi Ali Niafar

30 September 2019 4	Peykan (1)	4–0	Shohadaye Razakan Karaj (3)	Shahre Ghods
17:15	Milad Sheikh Soleimani 18'; Faraz Emam Ali 72'; Mahan Rahmani 74'; Alireza Kooshki 83'			Stadium: Shohada; Referee: Abdonabi Poor Khalaf

30 September 2019 4	Khooshe Talaei Saveh (2)	3–3 (a.e.t.) (1–3 p)	Shahin Bushehr (1)	Qom
17:15	Akbar Saghiri 15'; Ehsan Poor Sheikh Ali 16'; Sajad Azhdar 119'		Bahman Salari 73', 83'; Danyal Momeni 105'	Stadium: Yadegar Emam; Referee: Mohammad Reza Tarokh

30 September 2019 4	Kheybar Khorramabad (3)	0–3	Sepahan (1)	Khoram Abad
16:30			Morteza Mansouri 10'; Mahdi Kiani 80'; Ali Ghorbani 84'	Stadium: Takhti; Referee: Roohollah Sharifi

30 September 2019 4	Mashin Sazi (1)	0–1	Persepolis (1)	Tabriz
15:00			Vahid Amiri 90+11'	Stadium: Bonyan Dizel; Referee: Koopal Nazemi

30 September 2019 4	Fajr Sepasi (2)	2–2 (3–2 p)	Foolad (1)	Shiraz
17:15	Mohammad Hossein Karimzadeh 26'; Milad Gharibi 55'		Amir Hossein Bagherpoor 25'; Hassan Beyt Saeid 35'	Stadium: Hafezieh; Referee: Amir Arab Baraghi
	Penalties
	Milad Gharibi (penalty scored); Ayoub Kalantari (penalty missed); Bahram Ahmadi (penalty missed); Hamid Jokar (penalty scored); Baba Mohammadi (penalty scored)		(penalty missed) Luciano Pereira; (penalty missed) Meysam Doraghi; (penalty scored) Hassan Beyt Saeed; (penalty scored) Vahid Heydarieh; (penalty missed) Aref Aghasi

30 September 2019 4	Pars Jonoubi Jam (1)	1–2 (a.e.t.)	Zob Ahan (1)	Jam
17:15	Christantos 22'		Reza Khaleghifar 35'; Vahid Mohammadzadeh (P) 92'	Stadium: Takhti; Referee: Seyed Reza Mahdavi

1 October 2019 4	Sardar Bookan (3)	1–2 (a.e.t.)	Shahrdari Mahshahr (3)	Bookan
15:00	Farshid Tori 68'		Ali Cheraghi 88'; Ali Cheraghi 115'	Stadium: Khatam-ol-Anbiya; Referee: Abolfazl Doosti

=== Fifth round (round of 16) ===
Number of teams per tier entering this round
Pro League (1)	1. division (2)	2. division (3)	Provincial Leagues (4)	Total
11 / 16	3 / 18	1 / 28	1 / 34	16 / 96

16 October 2019 5	Zob Ahan (1)	2–4	Mes Kerman (2)	Isfahan
16:50	Danyal Esmaeilifar 24'; Mohammad Reza Khalatbari 86'		Hossein Shanani 5'; Shervin Bozorg 51', 60'; Amir Hossein Asgari 84'	Stadium: Foolad Shahr; Referee: Ali Safaei

16 October 2019 5	Shahin Bushehr (1)	2–0	Saipa (1)	Bushehr
17:00	Bahman Salari (P) 28'; Danyal Momeni 36'			Stadium: Shahid Mahdavi; Referee: Mohammad Reza Akbarian

16 October 2019 5	Shahr Khodro (1)	0–1	Naft Masjed Soleyman (1)	Mashhad
16:20			Ahmad Aljabouri 60'	Stadium: Imam Reza; Referee: Seyed Reza Mahdavi

17 October 2019 5	Shahrdari Mahshahr (3)	2–1	Esteghlal Novin Mahshahr (4)	Mahshahr
15:30	Shirzad Farid 13'; Mohammad Savad Kouhi 41'		Easa Mousavi 45'	Stadium: Shohada; Referee: Amir Ayar

17 October 2019 5	Esteghlal (1)	3–0 (a.e.t.)	Fajr Sepasi (2)	Tehran
16:50	Vorya Ghafouri 112'; Sajjad Aghayi 118'; Dariush Shojaeian 120'			Stadium: Azadi Stadium; Referee: Payam Heidari

26 November 2019 5	Persepolis (1)	1–0	Sanat Naft (1)	Tehran
16:15	Mehdi Torabi 54'			Stadium: Azadi Stadium; Referee: Mohammad Reza Akbarian

26 November 2019 5	Navad Urmia (2)	1–1 (a.e.t.) (6–7 p)	Tractor (1)	Urmia
14:00	Sirous Sadeghian 55'		Masoud Shojaei 39'	Stadium: Shahid Bakeri; Referee: Amir Arab Boraghi
	Penalties
	Goalkeeper: Rasoul Hosseini; Davood ? (penalty scored); Sirous Sadeghian (penalty scored); Alireza Ghasemi (penalty scored) ? Sodagar (penalty missed); Omid Rezaei (penalty scored); Mohammad Ebadzadeh (penalty scored); Armin Mostafavi (penalty scored); Mehdi Mohammadi (penalty missed)		Goalkeeper: Mohammad Reza Akhbari; (penalty scored) ? (penalty scored) Ashkan Dejagah; (penalty scored) Mohammad Reza Khanzadeh; (penalty missed) Willyan Mimbela; (penalty scored) Masoud Shojaei; (penalty scored) Mehdi Tikdari; (penalty scored) Mohammad Reza Azadi; (penalty scored) Saeid Mehri

26 November 2019 5	Sepahan (1)	2–1	Peykan (1)	Isfahan
16:20	Mohammad Mohebi 13'; Sajjad Shahbazzadeh 45'		Shahriar Moghanlou 63'	Stadium: Naghshe Jahan; Referee: Hamid Haj Malek

=== Sixth round (quarter-final) ===
Number of teams per tier entering this round
Pro League (1)	1. division (2)	2. division (3)	Provincial Leagues (4)	Total
6 / 16	1 / 18	1 / 28	0 / 34	8 / 96

23 December 2019 6	Shahrdari Mahshahr (3)	0–2	Persepolis (1)	Abadan
15:00			Ali Alipour 59', 72'	Stadium: Takhti; Attendance: 6600; Referee: Mo'ud Bonyadifar

23 December 2019 6	Naft Masjed Soleyman (1)	3–2 (a.e.t.)	Shahin Bushehr (1)	Masjed Soleyman
16:45	Farzad Hatami 35' (pen.); Hossein Ebrahimi 87'; Ahmad Aljabouri 106'		Hassan Najafi 24'; Bahman Salari 72'	Stadium: Shahid Behnam Mohammadi; Referee: Hassan Akrami

10 August 2020 6	Esteghlal (1)	2–0	Sepahan (1)	Tehran
20:30	Voria Ghafouri 45' (pen.); Ali Karimi 61'			Stadium: Azadi; Attendance: 0 (Note: The remainder of the competition, held in August 2020, was played behind closed doors due to the COVID-19 pandemic in Iran.); Referee: Mo'ud Bonyadifar
Note: Esteghlal-Sepahan Rivalry

19 February 2020 6	Tractor (1)	4–1	Mes Kerman (2)	Tabriz
15:00	Khanzadeh 32'; Dejagah 42'; Asadi 44' (pen.); Mehri 77'		Rashidi Farrokhi 59'	Stadium: Yadegar-e Emam; Referee: Mohammad Hossein Torabian

=== Seventh round (semifinal) ===
Number of teams per tier entering this round
Pro League (1)	1. division (2)	2. division (3)	Provincial Leagues (4)	Total
4 / 16	0 / 18	0 / 28	0 / 34	4 / 96

25 August 2020 7	Tractor (1)	1–0	Naft Masjed Soleyman (1)	Tabriz
19:00	Saeid Mehri 47'			Stadium: Yadegar-e Emam; Attendance: 0 Referee: Bijan Heydari

26 August 2020 7	Persepolis (1)	2–2 (a.e.t.) (1–4 p)	Esteghlal (1)	Tehran
19:00	Bashar Resan 49'; Ali Alipour 88'		Mehdi Ghaedi 4'; Mohammad Daneshgar 90+3'	Stadium: Azadi; Attendance: 0 Referee: Payam Heydari
	Penalties
	Ahmad Nourollahi (penalty missed); Omid Alishah (penalty scored); Christian Osaguona (penalty missed)		(penalty scored) Cheick Diabaté; (penalty scored) Vouria Ghafouri; (penalty scored) Hrvoje Milić; (penalty scored) Amir Arsalan Motahari
Note: Derby 93

=== Eighth round (final) ===
Number of teams per tier entering this round
Pro League (1)	1. division (2)	2. division (3)	Provincial Leagues (4)	Total
2 / 16	0 / 18	0 / 28	0 / 34	2 / 96

3 September 2020 8	Esteghlal (1)	2–3	Tractor (1)	Mashhad
18:15	Mehdi Ghayedi 51; Amir Arsalan Motahari 79'		Mohammad Reza Khanzadeh 17'; Ashkan Dejagah 34'; Akbar Imani 41'	Stadium: Imam Reza; Attendance: 0 Referee: Mo'ud Bonyadifar

== Statistics ==
=== Top scorers ===
Goalscorers count only from the second stage.

Rank	Player	Club	Goals
1	(Iran) Bahman Salari	Shahin Bushehr	4
2	(Iran) Ahmad Aljabouri	Naft Masjed Soleyman	3
2	(Iran) Ali Alipour	Persepolis	3
2	(Iran) Ashkan Dejagah	Tractor	3
5	(Iran) Ali Cheraghi	Shahrdari Mahshahr	2
5	(Iran) Danyal Momeni	Shahin Bushehr	2
5	(Iran) Easa Mousavi	Esteghlal Novin Mahshahr	2
5	(Iran) Hossein Shanani	Mes Kerman	2
5	(Iran) Mohammad Ahle Shakhe	Sanat Naft	2
5	(Iran) Sajjad Aghayi	Esteghlal	2
5	(Iran) Shervin Bozorg	Mes Kerman	2
5	(Iran) Voria Ghafouri	Esteghlal	2

=== Discipline ===
A player was automatically suspended for the next match for the following offences:

- Receiving a red card (red card suspensions could be extended for serious offences)
- Receiving two yellow cards in two different matches (yellow card suspensions were not carried forward to any other leagues)

The following suspensions were served during the tournament:

Player	Team	Offence(s)	Suspension(s)
Mohammad Iran Pourian	Sepahan	(red card) in Semi Final (Previous Season) vs Perspolis (29 May 2019)	Round of 32 vs Kheybar Khorramabad (30 September 2019)
Kiros Stanlley	Sepahan	(red card) in Semi Final (Previous Season) vs Perspolis (29 May 2019)	Round of 32 vs Kheybar Khorramabad (30 September 2019)
Masoud Shojaei	Tractor	(red card) in Round of 32 (Previous Season) vs Sanat Naft (14 September 2018)	Round of 32 vs PAS Hamedan (29 September 2019)
Mohammad Chaharmahali	Khooshe Talaei Saveh	(red card) ?	Round of 32 vs Shahin Bushehr (30 September 2019)
Reza Moradi	Baadraan	(red card) ?	Round of 32 vs Mes Kerman (28 September 2019)
Ali Khalili	Mes Novin Kerman	(red card) ?	Round of 32 vs Esteghlal Novin Mahshahr (30 September 2019)
Mohsen Dara Motlagh	Esteghlal Novin Mahshahr	(red card) in third round vs Sardar Jangal (6 September 2019)	Round of 32 vs Mes Novin Kerman (30 September 2019)
Mohammad Ajir	Sardar Bookan	(red card) in third round vs Daryaye Harbadeye Mahmoudabad (7 September 2019)	Round of 32 vs Shahrdari Mahshahr (1 October 2019)
Mehran Hamoudi	Shahrdari Mahshahr	(red card) in Round of 32 vs Sardar Bookan (1 October 2019)	Round of 16 vs Esteghlal Novin Mahshahr (17 October 2019)

== See also ==
- Iran Pro League 2019–20
- Azadegan League 2019–20
- Iran Football's 2nd Division 2019–20
- Iran Football's 3rd Division 2019–20
- Iranian Super Cup
