= 2018–19 Zob Ahan F.C. season =

Zob Ahan Isfahan FC
2018–19 season
- Chairman: Saeid Azari
- Manager: Omid Namazi (until 14 November 2018); Alireza Mansourian (from 15 November 2018)
- Stadium: Foolad Shahr Stadium
- Iran Pro League: 6th
- Hazfi Cup: Round of 32
- AFC Champions League: Round of 16
Home colours	Away colours

The 2018–19 season was Zob Ahan Football Club's 18th season in the Iran Pro League, and their 23rd consecutive season in the top division of Iranian football. They also competed in the Hazfi Cup and AFC Champions League, and had their 48th year in existence as a football club.

== Players ==
=== First team squad ===
As of 30 May 2019.

Out for Injuries	Released – Retired

No.	Name	Nat.	Position(s)	Since	Date of birth (age)	Signed from	Ends	Games	Goals
Goalkeepers
1	Mohammad Bagher Sadeghi	(Iran)	GK	2017	April 1, 1989 (age 37)	(Youth system) (Iran) Saipa	2019	57	0
12	Mohammad Rashid Mazaheri	(Iran)	GK	2014	May 18, 1989 (age 36)	(Iran) Foolad	2019	176	0
13	Meraj Esmaeili	(Iran)	GK	2017	January 13, 2000 (age 26)	(Youth system)	2020	2	0
Defenders
2	Mohammad Nejad Mehdi	(Iran)	CB / RB	2015	October 20, 1992 (age 33)	(Iran) Padideh	2019	128	7
3	Vahid Mohammadzadeh	(Iran)	CB / LB	2016	May 16, 1989 (age 36)	(Iran) Saipa	2020	105	5
4	Hadi Mohammadi	(Iran)	CB	2014	March 8, 1991 (age 35)	(Iran) Damash	2019	93	5
5	Aref Gholami	(Iran)	CB / RB	2018	April 19, 1997 (age 29)	(Iran) Sepahan	2019	7	0
24	Mehran Derakhshan Mehr	(Iran)	LB / LM	2015	August 10, 1998 (age 27)	(Youth system)	2018	65	3
26	Mojtaba Moghtadaei	(Iran)	RB	2018	March 20, 1996 (aged 22)	(Iran) Sanat Naft	2021	8	0
61	Masoud Ebrahimzadeh	(Iran)	LB / LM	2018	January 16, 1989 (age 37)	(Iran) Sanat Naft	2020	19	0
69	Milad Fakhreddini	(Iran)	RB / RM	2018	May 26, 1990 (age 35)	(Iran) Gostaresh Foulad	2020	55	4
Midfielders
6	Hamid Bou Hamdan	(Iran)	DM / LB	2017	May 5, 1991 (aged 27)	(Iran) Foolad	2020	75	2
7	Mohammad Reza Hosseini	(Iran)	RW / AM	2015	September 15, 1989 (age 36)	(Iran) Fajr Sepasi	2019	133	14
8	Ghasem Hadadifar	(Iran)	CM / DM	2003	July 12, 1983 (age 42)	(Youth system)	2019	349	20
10	Mohsen Mosalman	(Iran)	AM / CM	2018	January 27, 1991 (aged 27)	(Youth system) (Iran) Persepolis	2020	147	15
17	Mohammadreza Abbasi	(Iran)	AM / LW / RW	2014	July 27, 1996 (age 29)	(Youth system)	2020	81	5
20	Zobeir Niknafs	(Iran)	DM / CM	2018	April 12, 1993 (aged 25)	(Iran) Sanat Naft	2020	29	1
23	Reza Habibzadeh	(Iran)	LW / RW	2018	April 13, 1996 (aged 22)	(Iran) Naft Tehran	2021	23	3
47	Mojtaba Haghdoust	(Iran)	AM	2018	January 22, 1996 (aged 22)	(Iran) Foolad	2021	0	0
77	Abouzar Safarzadeh	(Iran)	RW / LW	2018	December 24, 1995 (aged 22)	(Iran) Fajr Sepasi	2021	2	0
Forwards
9	Masoud Hassanzadeh	(Iran)	CF	2018	April 12, 1991 (age 35)	(Iran) Sepahan	2020	56	17
14	Eddie Hernández	(Honduras)	CF	2018	February 27, 1991 (age 35)	(Kazakhstan) Irtysh Pavlodar	2019	3	2
99	Marion Silva Fernandes	(Brazil)	LW / CF	2018	September 7, 1991 (age 34)	(Brazil) CRB	2020	2	0
loan Players
6	Mehdi Mehdipour	(Iran)	DM, CM	2014	February 18, 1994 (aged 24)	On loan at Tractor Sazi		106	2
23	Danial Esmaeilifar	(Iran)	RM, RB	2014	February 26, 1993 (aged 25)	On loan at Tractor Sazi		104	6
10	Ehsan Pahlavan	(Iran)	LM, LW, AM	2013	July 25, 1993 (aged 24)	On loan at Tractor Sazi		131	13
Players transferred during the season
11	Morteza Tabrizi	(Iran)	LW / CF	2013	January 6, 1991 (age 35)	Moving to Esteghlal		180	53

== Transfers ==
=== In ===
No	P	Name	Age	Moving from	Ends	Transfer fee	Type	Transfer window	Quota	Source
4	CB	Hadi Mohammadi	27	Tractor Sazi	2019	—	Loan return	Summer		
22	GK	Mohammad Amin Bahrami	21	Tractor Sazi	2019	—	Loan return	Summer		
9	FW	Masoud Hassanzadeh	27	Sepahan	2020	—	Transfer	Summer		
10	MF	Mohsen Mosalman	27	Persepolis	2020	—	Transfer	Summer		
61	DF	Masoud Ebrahimzadeh	29	Sanat Naft	2020	—	Transfer	Summer		
23	MF	Reza Habibzadeh	22	Naft Tehran	2021	—	Transfer	Summer		
77	MF	Abouzar Safarzadeh	22	Fajr Sepasi	2021	—	Transfer	Summer		
20	MF	Zobeir Niknafs	25	Sanat Naft	2020	—	Transfer	Summer		
47	MF	Mojtaba Haghdoust	22	Foolad	2021	—	Transfer	Summer		
99	FW	Marion Silva Fernandes	26	(Brazil) CRB	2020	—	Transfer	Summer		
14	FW	Eddie Hernández	27	(Kazakhstan) Irtysh Pavlodar	2019	—	Transfer	Summer		
26	CB	Mojtaba Moghtadaei	22	Sanat Naft	2021	—	Transfer	Summer		
5	CB	Aref Gholami	21	Sepahan	2019	—	Transfer	Summer		
32	LB	Hamid Maleki	21	Sepidrood	2021	—	Transfer	Summer		

=== Out ===
No	P	Name	Age	Moving to	Transfer fee	Type	Transfer window	Source
9	RW	Rabih Ataya	28	(Lebanon) Al Ansar	Free		Summer	
99	FW	Kiros Stanlley	29	Sepahan	Free		Summer	
66	CB	Khaled Shafiei	30	Sepahan	Free		Summer	
33	CB	Mohammad Sattari	24	Pars Jonoubi	Free		Summer	
4	DM	Akbar Imani	26	Sanat Naft	Free		Summer	
21	DM	Bakhtiar Rahmani	26	Sepahan	Free		Summer	
32	LB	Mohammad Amini	22	Sorkhpooshan	Free		Summer	
5	CB	Giorgi Gvelesiani	27	Nassaji	Free		Summer	
11	FW	Morteza Tabrizi	27	Esteghlal	180 Tsd.		Summer	
30	AM	Mehdi Rajabzadeh	40	Retired	Free		Summer	

== Competitions ==
=== Overview ===
Competition	First match	Last match	Starting round	Final position	Record							
Competition	First match	Last match	Starting round	Final position	Pld	W	D	L	GF	GA	GD	Win %
PGPL	26 July 2018	16 May 2019	Matchday 1	6th	30	9	13	8	28	28	+0	30.00
Hazfi Cup	13 September 2018	13 September 2018	Round of 32	Round of 32	1	0	0	1	1	2	−1	0.00
2019 ACL	12 February 2019		Preliminary round 2		7	5	2	0	14	7	+7	71.43
Total					38	14	15	9	43	37	+6	36.84

Last updated: 7 May 2019
Source: Competitions

=== Iran Pro League ===
==== Standings ====
Pos	Team	Pld	W	D	L	GF	GA	GD	Pts	Qualification or relegation
4	Padideh	30	16	8	6	32	16	+16	56	Qualification for 2020 AFC Champions League Qualifying play-offs
5	Tractor Sazi	30	14	10	6	42	25	+17	52	
6	Zob Ahan	30	9	13	8	28	28	0	40	
7	Saipa	30	9	11	10	28	33	−5	38	
8	Foolad	30	9	11	10	30	39	−9	38	

Source: IPL Table
Rules for classification: 1) Points; 2) Goal difference; 3) Goals scored.

==== Results summary ====
Overall								Home						Away					
Pld	W	D	L	GF	GA	GD	Pts	W	D	L	GF	GA	GD	W	D	L	GF	GA	GD
30	9	13	8	28	28	0	40	3	8	4	14	13	+1	6	5	4	14	15	−1

Last updated: 3 May 2019.
Source: Ipl Stats

==== Results by round ====
Round	1	2	3	4	5	6	7	8	9	10	11	12	13	14	15	16	17	18	19	20	21	22	23	24	25	26	27	28	29	30
Ground	A	H	A	H	A	H	A	H	A	H	A	A	H	A	H	H	A	H	A	H	A	H	A	H	A	H	H	A	H	A
Result	W	D	D	L	W	L	L	D	D	D	L	L	L	D	D	D	L	L	D	D	W	W	W	D	W	D	W	W	W	D
Position	4	4	6	8	4	9	9	9	9	9	11	12	13	14	14	14	14	14	14	14	13	12	10	10	8	8	8	7	6	6

Updated to match(es) played on 3 May 2019. Source: "Ipl".
A = Away; H = Home; W = Win; D = Draw; L = Loss

==== Matches ====
Win Draw Loss

July 27, 2018 1	Nassaji Mazandaran	–	Zob Ahan	Qa'em Shahr
UTC+04:30		[ Report]		Stadium: Vatani Stadium

== AFC Champions League ==
=== AFC Champions League 2019 ===
==== Qualifying play-offs ====
12 February 2019 Preliminary round 2	Zob Ahan (Iran)	1–0 (a.e.t.)	Al-Kuwait	Isfahan
19:00 UTC+3:30	Marion (yellow card) 72'; Mazaheri (yellow card) 112'; Osaguona 110', (yellow card) 120'	Report	Youssuf (yellow card) 66'; Mido (yellow card) 75'; Al Hajri (yellow card) 103'; Zayid (yellow card) 109'; Hamoud (yellow card) 113'	Stadium: Foolad Shahr Stadium; Attendance: 3,600; Referee: Minoru Tōjō (Japan)

19 February 2019 Play-off round	Al-Gharafa (Qatar)	2–3	(Iran) Zob Ahan	Al Rayyan
18:00 UTC+3	Alaaeldin 21'; Taremi 36'; Mendes (yellow card) 58'	Report	Osaguona 47'; Motahari 63'; Nejad Mehdi 79'	Stadium: Thani bin Jassim Stadium; Attendance: 677; Referee: Hettikamkanamge Perera (Sri Lanka)

==== Group stage ====
Pos	Team	Pld	W	D	L	GF	GA	GD	Pts	Qualification	ZOB	NAS	ZAW	WAS
1	(Iran) Zob Ahan	6	3	3	0	10	5	+5	12	Advance to knockout stage	—	0–0	0–0	2–0
2	(Saudi Arabia) Al-Nassr	6	3	1	2	11	7	+4	10	Advance to knockout stage	2–3	—	4–1	3–1
3	(Iraq) Al-Zawraa	6	2	2	2	14	9	+5	8		2–2	1–2	—	5–0
4	(United Arab Emirates) Al-Wasl	6	1	0	5	4	18	−14	3		1–3	1–0	1–5	—

Source: AFC
Rules for classification: Group stage tiebreakers

4 March 2019 1	Zob Ahan (Iran)	0–0	(Iraq) Al-Zawra'a	Isfahan, Iran
19:00 UTC+3:30	Haddadifar (yellow card) 30'	Live Report; Stats Report	Saeed (yellow card) 17'; Kareem (yellow card) 28'	Stadium: Foolad Shahr Stadium; Attendance: 2,433; Referee: Fu Ming (China)

11 March 2019 2	Al-Nassr (Saudi Arabia)	2–3	(Iran) Zob Ahan	Dubai, United Arab Emirates
19:45 UTC+4	Giuliano 5'; Hamdallah 58' (pen.)	Live Report; Stats Report	Fakhreddini (yellow card) 24'; Nejadmehdi 30'; Mohammadzadeh 39', (yellow card) 90+4'; Mazaheri (yellow card) 56'; Motahari 90+1'; Hosseini (yellow card) 90+4'	Stadium: Al Maktoum Stadium; Attendance: 2,850; Referee: Ma Ning (China)
Note: Matches between teams from Iran and Saudi Arabia are played on neutral venues due to deterioration of Iran–Saudi Arabia relations.

8 April 2019 3	Al-Wasl (United Arab Emirates)	1–3	(Iran) Zob Ahan	Dubai, United Arab Emirates
19:40 UTC+4	Caio 14'; Esmaeel (yellow card) 67'; Khamis (yellow card) 74'; Ali (yellow card) 79'; Al-Bloushi (yellow card) 90+2'	Live Report; Stats Report	Osaguona 16'; Motahari 35'; Niknafs (yellow card) 43'; Bouhamdan 86'	Stadium: Zabeel Stadium; Attendance: 620; Referee: Yudai Yamamoto (Japan)

23 April 2019 4	Zob Ahan (Iran)	2–0	(United Arab Emirates) Al-Wasl	Isfahan, Iran
20:00 UTC+4:30	Cheraghali 2'; Bouhamdan (yellow card) 9'; Osaguona (yellow card) 11'; Motahari 15', (yellow card) 39'	Live Report; Stats Report		Stadium: Foolad Shahr Stadium; Attendance: 3,560; Referee: Ko Hyung-jin (South Korea)

7 May 2019 5	Al-Zawraa (Iraq)	2–2	(Iran) Zob Ahan	Karbala, Iraq
21:30 UTC+3	Abbas 44'; Abdul-Raheem 61'; Fadhel (yellow card) 84'	Live Report; Stats Report	Niknafs 28'; Osaguona (yellow card) 82'; Habibzadeh 90+2'; Fakhreddini (red card) 90+10'	Stadium: Karbala Sports City; Attendance: 7,621; Referee: Hettikamkanamge Perera (Sri Lanka)

29 May 2019 6	Zob Ahan (Iran)	0–0	(Saudi Arabia) Al-Nassr	Doha, Qatar
21:30 UTC+3	Nejadmehdi (yellow card) 76'	Live Report; Stats Report		Stadium: Grand Hamad Stadium; Attendance: 456; Referee: Valentin Kovalenko (Uzbekistan)
Note: Matches between teams from Iran and Saudi Arabia are played on neutral venues due to deterioration of Iran–Saudi Arabia relations.

== Statistics ==
=== Appearances ===
No.	Pos	Nat	Player	Total		Pro League		AFC Champions League		Hazfi Cup	
No.	Pos	Nat	Player	Apps	Goals	Apps	Goals	Apps	Goals	Apps	Goals
1	GK	(Iran) IRN	Mohammad Bagher Sadeghi	5	0	4	0	1	0	0	0
2	DF	(Iran) IRN	Mohammad Nejad Mehdi	26	3	17	1	8	2	1	0
3	DF	(Iran) IRN	Vahid Mohammadzadeh	23	2	19	1	4	1	0	0
4	DF	(Iran) IRN	Hadi Mohammadi	26	1	20	1	5	0	1	0
5	DF	(Iran) IRN	Aref Gholami	7	0	7	0	0	0	0	0
6	MF	(Iran) IRN	Hamid Bou Hamdan	36	2	27	1	8	1	1	0
7	MF	(Iran) IRN	Mohammad Reza Hosseini	35	2	27	2	7	0	1	0
8	MF	(Iran) IRN	Ghasem Hadadifar	31	0	22	0	8	0	1	0
9	FW	(Iran) IRN	Mohammad Reza Khalatbari	1	0	1	0	0	0	0	0
10	MF	(Iran) IRN	Mohsen Mosalman	13	3	12	3	0	0	1	0
11	FW	(Iran) IRN	Morteza Tabrizi	1	0	1	0	0	0	0	0
12	GK	(Iran) IRN	Mohammad Rashid Mazaheri	33	0	25	0	7	0	1	0
13	GK	(Iran) IRN	Meraj Esmaeili	2	0	2	0	0	0	0	0
14	FW	(Honduras) HON	Eddie Hernández	14	3	13	3	0	0	1	0
16	MF	(Iran) IRN	Alireza Cheraghali	16	2	9	1	7	1	0	0
17	MF	(Iran) IRN	Mohammadreza Abbasi	26	0	21	0	4	0	1	0
18	FW	(Nigeria) NGA	Christian Osaguona	19	4	13	1	6	3	0	0
19	MF	(Iran) IRN	Alireza Ghaderi	1	0	1	0	0	0	0	0
20	MF	(Iran) IRN	Zobeir Niknafs	30	1	23	0	6	1	1	0
21	FW	(Iran) IRN	Ali Khodadadi	0	0	0	0	0	0	0	0
23	MF	(Iran) IRN	Reza Habibzadeh	22	3	17	2	5	1	0	0
24	DF	(Iran) IRN	Mehran Derakhshan Mehr	18	2	13	2	4	0	1	0
26	DF	(Iran) IRN	Mojtaba Moghtadaei	10	0	8	0	2	0	0	0
28	MF	(Iran) IRN	Hamidreza Sepahi	0	0	0	0	0	0	0	0
32	DF	(Iran) IRN	Hamid Maleki	17	0	11	0	6	0	0	0
33	FW	(Iran) IRN	Alireza Monazzemi	4	0	3	0	1	0	0	0
47	MF	(Iran) IRN	Mojtaba Haghdoost	0	0	0	0	0	0	0	0
48	DF	(Iran) IRN	Nima Taheri	3	0	1	0	2	0	0	0
61	DF	(Iran) IRN	Masoud Ebrahimzadeh	21	0	17	0	3	0	1	0
69	DF	(Iran) IRN	Milad Fakhreddini	32	0	24	0	7	0	1	0
70	FW	(Iran) IRN	Rahim Zahivi	4	1	4	1	0	0	0	0
72	FW	(Iran) IRN	Amir Arsalan Motahari	20	10	13	6	7	4	0	0
77	MF	(Iran) IRN	Abouzar Safarzadeh	16	1	14	0	1	0	1	1
99	FW	(Brazil) BRA	Marion Silva Fernandes	28	2	23	2	4	0	1	0

=== Hazfi Cup ===
==== Matches ====
Win Draw Loss

=== Top scorers ===
Includes all competitive matches. The list is sorted by shirt number when total goals are equal.

Last updated on 15 May 2018

Ranking	Position	Nation	Name	Pro League	Champions League	Hazfi Cup	Total
1							

Friendlies and pre-season goals are not recognized as competitive match goals.

=== Top assistors ===
Includes all competitive matches. The list is sorted by shirt number when total assistors are equal.

Last updated on 14 May 2018

Ranking	Position	Nation	Name	Pro League	Champions League	Hazfi Cup	Total
1							

Friendlies and Pre season goals are not recognized as competitive match assist.

=== Disciplinary record ===
Includes all competitive matches. Players with 1 card or more included only.

Last updated on 15 May 2019

				2017–18 Iran Pro League			AFC Champions League			Hazfi Cup			Total		
Position	Nation	Number	Name	Booked	(yellow card) (yellow-red card)	Sent off (straight red)	Booked	(yellow card) (yellow-red card)	Sent off (straight red)	Booked	(yellow card) (yellow-red card)	Sent off (straight red)	Booked	(yellow card) (yellow-red card)	Sent off (straight red)
1				0	0	0	0	0	0	0	0	0	0	0	0

=== Goals conceded ===
- Updated on 30 May 2016

Position	Nation	Number	Name	Pro League	Champions League	Hazfi Cup	Total	Clean Sheets
GK				0	0	0	0	0
TOTALS				0	0	0	0	0

=== Own goals ===
- Updated on 5 January 2016

Position	Nation	Number	Name	Pro League	Champions League	Hazfi Cup	Total
				0	0	0	0

== Club ==
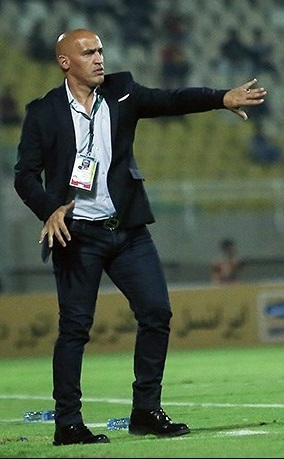
Alireza Mansourian, current manager of Zob Ahan

Position	Name
Head Coach	(Iran) Alireza Mansourian
Assistant Coach	(Iran) Mohammad Khorramgah (Iran) Ali Dehghan
Goalkeeping Coach	(Northern Ireland) Anthony McAllen
Fitness Coach	(Scotland) Brian O'Donnell
Analyst	(Iran) Kianoush Forouzesh
Physiotherapist	(Iran) Abbas Moradi
Doctor	(Iran) Amir Hossein Sharifianpour
Logistics	(Iran) Mahmoud Mehruyan
Team Director	(Iran) Majid Hajrasouliha
B team manager	(Iran) Mehdi Rajabzadeh
Media Officer	(Iran) Ehsan Baeedi

=== Other information ===
Chairman	(Iran) Saeed Azari
Ground (capacity and dimensions)	Foolad Shahr Stadium (20,000 / )

Updated to match played 4 January 2016

== See also ==
- 2018–19 Persian Gulf Pro League
- 2018–19 Hazfi Cup
- 2019 AFC Champions League
