= 2017–18 Zob Ahan F.C. season =

Zob Ahan Isfahan FC
2017–18 season
- Chairman: Saeid Azari
- Manager: Amir Ghalenoei
- Stadium: Foolad Shahr Stadium, Fooladshahr
- IPL: 2nd
- Hazfi Cup: 1/16 Final
- AFC Champions League: 2018: 1/8 Final
- Top goalscorer: League: Morteza Tabrizi (13 goals); All: Morteza Tabrizi (19 goals)
- Highest home attendance: 15.000 v Esteghlal (4 February 2018)
- Lowest home attendance: 300 v Saipa (26 September 2017)
Home colours	Away colours

The 2017–18 season was Zob Ahan Football Club's 17th season in the Iran Pro League, and their 22nd consecutive season in the top division of Iranian football. They also competed in the Hazfi Cup and AFC Champions League, and had their 47th year in existence as a football club.

== Players ==
=== First-team squad ===
As of 30 May 2018.

Out for Injuries	Released – Retired

No.	Name	Nationality	Position (s)	Since	Date of birth (age)	Signed from	Ends	Games	Goals
Goalkeepers
1	Mohammad Bagher Sadeghi	(Iran)	GK	2014	April 1, 1989 (aged 29)	(Youth system) (Iran) Saipa	2018	50	0
12	Mohammad Rashid Mazaheri	(Iran)	GK	2014	May 18, 1989 (aged 28)	(Iran) Foolad	2019	143	0
44	Meraj Esmaeili ^{U21}	(Iran)	GK	2017	January 13, 2000 (aged 18)	(Youth system)	2020	0	0
Defenders
2	Mohammad Nejad Mehdi	(Iran)	CB	2015	October 20, 1992 (aged 25)	(Iran) Padideh	2019	102	3
3	Vahid Mohammadzadeh	(Iran)	CB, LB	2016	May 16, 1989 (aged 28)	(Iran) Saipa	2018	83	3
24	Mehran Derakhshan Mehr^{U21}	(Iran)	LB, LM	2015	August 10, 1998 (aged 19)	(Youth system)	2018	37	0
26	Nima Taheri^{U23}	(Iran)	DF	2015	November 5, 1996 (aged 21)	(Youth system)	2018	0	0
31	Mohammad Amini	(Iran)	LB	2017	September 29, 1995 (aged 22)	(Iran) Mes Kerman	2019	5	0
33	Mohammad Sattari	(Iran)	LB, CM	2016	October 30, 1993 (aged 24)	(Iran) Malavan	2019	37	0
66	Khaled Shafiei	(Iran)	DF	2018	January 29, 1988 (aged 30)	(South Korea) FC Seoul	2018	15	0
69	Milad Fakhreddini	(Iran)	RB, RM	2018	May 26, 1990 (aged 27)	(Iran) Gostaresh Foulad	2018	23	4
Midfielders
4	Akbar Imani	(Iran)	CM	2018	March 21, 1992 (aged 26)	(Iran) Padideh	2018	52	3
5	Giorgi Gvelesiani	(Georgia (country))	CM, CB	2017	May 5, 1991 (aged 27)	(Georgia (country)) Dinamo Tbilisi	2019	30	1
8	Ghasem Hadadifar	(Iran)	CM	2003	July 12, 1983 (aged 34)	(Youth system)	2018	346	20
17	Mohammadreza Abbasi^{U23}	(Iran)	AM	2014	July 27, 1996 (aged 21)	(Youth system)	2020	55	5
21	Bakhtiar Rahmani	(Iran)	AM	2018	September 23, 1991 (aged 26)	(Iran) Paykan	2018	22	1
30	Mehdi Rajabzadeh	(Iran)	AM, ST	2012	June 21, 1978 (aged 39)	(Iran) Fajr Sepasi	2017	353	106
88	Hamid Bou Hamdan	(Iran)	MF, LB	2017	May 5, 1991 (aged 27)	(Iran) Foolad	2018	39	0
Forwards
7	Mohammad Reza Hosseini	(Iran)	RM, RW	2015	September 15, 1989 (aged 28)	(Iran) Fajr Sepasi	2019	97	12
9	Rabih Ataya	(Lebanon)	RM, RW, RM	2017	July 16, 1989 (aged 28)	(Lebanon) Al-Ansar	2018	39	1
11	Morteza Tabrizi	(Iran)	LW, ST	2013	January 6, 1991 (aged 27)	(Iran) Pas Hamedan	2019	178	53
28	Ali Khodadadi ^{U21}	(Iran)	ST	2017	February 5, 1998 (aged 20)	(Youth system)	2019	0	0
99	Kiros Stanlley	(Brazil)	ST	2013	August 21, 1988 (aged 29)	(Brazil) América-RN	2018	30	10
Players transferred during the season
19	Ali Hamam	(Lebanon)	RB, CB	2014	August 25, 1986 (aged 31)	(Lebanon) Nejmeh	2018	108	4
6	Mehdi Mehdipour	(Iran)	DM, CM	2014	February 18, 1994 (aged 24)	(Youth system) (Iran) Rah Ahan	2018	106	2
23	Danial Esmaeilifar	(Iran)	RM, RB, RM	2014	February 26, 1993 (aged 25)	(Iran) Payam Sanat	2018	104	6
10	Ehsan Pahlavan	(Iran)	LM, LW, AM	2013	July 25, 1993 (aged 24)	(Iran) Gostaresh Foulad	2019	131	13
20	Esmaeil Sharifat	(Iran)	LM, LW	2017	September 7, 1988 (aged 29)	(Iran) Foolad	2018	11	1
27	Iman Mousavi	(Iran)	ST	2017	February 5, 1989 (aged 29)	(Iran) Oxin Alborz	2017	7	0

==== Iran Pro League squad ====
As of 1 July 2017 Note: Flags indicate national team as defined under FIFA eligibility rules; some limited exceptions apply. Players may hold more than one non-FIFA nationality.

No.	Pos.	Nation	Player
1	GK	IRN	Mohammad Bagher Sadeghi
2	DF	IRN	Mohammad Nejad Mehdi
3	DF	IRN	Vahid Mohammadzadeh
4	MF	IRN	Akbar Imani
5	DF	GEO	Giorgi Gvelesiani
7	MF	IRN	Mohammad Reza Hosseini
8	MF	IRN	Ghasem Hadadifar (Vice-Captain)
9	MF	LBN	Rabih Ataya
11	FW	IRN	Morteza Tabrizi (Vice-Captain)
12	GK	IRN	Mohammad Rashid Mazaheri
17	MF	IRN	Mohammadreza Abbasi ^{U23}

No.	Pos.	Nation	Player
21	MF	IRN	Bakhtiar Rahmani
24	MF	IRN	Mehran Derakhshan Mehr ^{U21}
30	FW	IRN	Mehdi Rajabzadeh (captain)
31	DF	IRN	Mohammad Amini ^{U23}
33	DF	IRN	Mohammad Sattari
39	DF	IRN	Hassan Karimi ^{U23}
66	DF	IRN	Khaled Shafiei
69	DF	IRN	Milad Fakhreddini
88	MF	IRN	Hamid Bou Hamdan
99	FW	BRA	Kiros

- U21 = Under 21 Player
- U23 = Under 23 Player

==== ACL 2017 Squad ====
Note: Flags indicate national team as defined under FIFA eligibility rules; some limited exceptions apply. Players may hold more than one non-FIFA nationality.

No.	Pos.	Nation	Player
1	GK	IRN	Mohammad Bagher Sadeghi
2	DF	IRN	Mohammad Nejad Mehdi
3	DF	IRN	Vahid Mohammadzadeh
4	MF	IRN	Akbar Imani
5	DF	GEO	Giorgi Gvelesiani
6	DF	IRN	Khaled Shafiei
7	MF	IRN	Mohammad Reza Hosseini
8	MF	IRN	Ghasem Hadadifar (Vice-Captain)
9	MF	LBN	Rabih Ataya
10	MF	IRN	Bakhtiar Rahmani
11	FW	IRN	Morteza Tabrizi (Vice-Captain)

No.	Pos.	Nation	Player
12	GK	IRN	Mohammad Rashid Mazaheri
17	MF	IRN	Mohammadreza Abbasi ^{U23}
24	MF	IRN	Mehran Derakhshan Mehr ^{U21}
30	FW	IRN	Mehdi Rajabzadeh (captain)
31	DF	IRN	Mohammad Amini ^{U23}
33	DF	IRN	Mohammad Sattari
34	DF	IRN	Milad Fakhreddini
39	DF	IRN	Hassan Karimi ^{U23}
88	MF	IRN	Hamid Bou Hamdan
99	FW	BRA	Kiros

=== Loan list ===
Note: Flags indicate national team as defined under FIFA eligibility rules; some limited exceptions apply. Players may hold more than one non-FIFA nationality.

No.	Pos.	Nation	Player
6	MF	IRN	Mehdi Mehdipour (at Tractor Sazi)
10	MF	IRN	Ehsan Pahlevan (at Tractor Sazi)
23	MF	IRN	Danial Esmaeilifar (at Tractor Sazi)

No.	Pos.	Nation	Player
36	MF	IRN	Alireza Aghabarari ^{U19} (at Moghavemat Tehran)
—	GK	IRN	Mohammad Amin Bahrami ^{U21} (at Tractor Sazi)
—	DF	IRN	Hadi Mohammadi (at Tractor Sazi)

== Transfers ==
Confirmed transfers 2017–18

=== Summer ===
In: Note: Flags indicate national team as defined under FIFA eligibility rules; some limited exceptions apply. Players may hold more than one non-FIFA nationality.

No.	Pos.	Nation	Player
20	MF	IRN	Esmaeil Sharifat^{PL} (from Foolad Khuzestan)
88	MF	IRN	Hamid Bou Hamdan^{PL} (from Foolad Khuzestan)
1	GK	IRN	Mohammad Bagher Sadeghi^{PL} (from Saba Qom)
5	DF	GEO	Giorgi Gvelesiani (from (Georgia (country)) Dinamo Tbilisi)
99	FW	BRA	Kiros Stanlley Soares Ferraz (from (Brazil) América-RN)
27	FW	IRN	Iman Mousavi^{PL} (from Oxin Alborz)
31	DF	IRN	Mohammad Amini^{PL} (from Mes Kerman)

Out: Note: Flags indicate national team as defined under FIFA eligibility rules; some limited exceptions apply. Players may hold more than one non-FIFA nationality.

No.	Pos.	Nation	Player
9	FW	HON	Jerry Bengtson (to (Costa Rica) Deportivo Saprissa)
19	DF	IRN	Mehrdad Ghanbari (to Gostaresh Foulad)
20	MF	IRN	Hojjat Haghverdi (to Paykan)
24	MF	IRN	Reza Shekari (to (Russia) FC Rostov)
70	FW	IRN	Yaser Feyzi (to Pars Jonoubi)
40	GK	IRN	Peyman Salmani (to Fajr Sepasi)
22	GK	IRN	Hamid Erfani (to Mes Kerman)

=== Winter ===
In: Note: Flags indicate national team as defined under FIFA eligibility rules; some limited exceptions apply. Players may hold more than one non-FIFA nationality.

No.	Pos.	Nation	Player
69	DF	IRN	Milad Fakhreddini (from Gostaresh Foulad)
66	DF	IRN	Khaled Shafiei (to (South Korea) FC Seoul)
4	MF	IRN	Akbar Imani (from Padideh)
21	MF	IRN	Bakhtiar Rahmani (from Paykan)

Out: Note: Flags indicate national team as defined under FIFA eligibility rules; some limited exceptions apply. Players may hold more than one non-FIFA nationality.

No.	Pos.	Nation	Player
19	DF	LBN	Ali Hamam (to (Lebanon) Nejmeh)
6	MF	IRN	Mehdi Mehdipour (from Tractor Sazi – conscription)
10	MF	IRN	Ehsan Pahlavan (from Tractor Sazi – conscription)
23	MF	IRN	Danial Esmaeilifar (from Tractor Sazi – conscription)
20	MF	IRN	Esmaeil Sharifat^{PL} (from Esteghlal Khuzestan)
27	FW	IRN	Iman Mousavi^{PL} (Released)

== Competitions ==
=== Overview ===
Competition	Started round	Current position / round	Final position / round	First match	Last match
Persian Gulf Pro League	—	—	2nd	27 July 2017	27 April 2018
AFC Champions League	Play Off	—	Round of 16	30 January 2018	
Hazfi Cup	Round of 32	—	Round of 32	8 September 2017	8 September 2017

Updated to match played 15 May 2018
Source: Competitions

=== Iran Pro League ===
==== Standings ====
Pos	Team	Pld	W	D	L	GF	GA	GD	Pts	Qualification or relegation
1	Persepolis (C)	30	19	7	4	48	15	+33	64	Qualification for the 2019 AFC Champions League group stage
2	Zob Ahan	30	15	10	5	46	30	+16	55	Qualification for the 2019 AFC Champions League qualifying play-offs
3	Esteghlal	30	15	9	6	43	18	+25	54	Qualification for 2019 AFC Champions League group stage (Note: Esteghlal qualified to AFC Champions League group stage directly by winning the Hazfi Cup)
4	Saipa	30	15	9	6	40	34	+6	54	Qualification for the 2019 AFC Champions League qualifying play-offs
5	Pars Jonoubi Jam	30	11	14	5	34	24	+10	47	

Updated to match(es) played on April 13, 2018. Source: IPL Stats, Soccerway
Rules for classification: 1) Points; 2) Goal difference; 3) Goals scored.
(C) Champions

==== Results summary ====
Overall								Home						Away					
Pld	W	D	L	GF	GA	GD	Pts	W	D	L	GF	GA	GD	W	D	L	GF	GA	GD
30	15	10	5	46	30	+16	55	10	2	3	28	12	+16	5	8	2	18	18	0

Last updated: 13 March 2018.
Source: Ipl Stats

==== Results by round ====
Round	1	2	3	4	5	6	7	8	9	10	11	12	13	14	15	16	17	18	19	20	21	22	23	24	25	26	27	28	29	30
Ground	A	H	A	H	A	H	A	H	A	H	A	A	H	A	H	H	A	H	A	H	A	H	A	H	A	H	H	A	H	A
Result	D	W	W	L	D	W	D	D	D	L	D	W	L	L	W	D	W	W	W	W	W	W	L	W	D	W	W	D	W	W
Position	6	4	5	7	7	6	7	7	7	8	7	7	8	10	9	9	8	7	4	4	3	2	2	2	2	2	2	3	2	2

Updated to match(es) played on 13 March 2018. Source: "Ipl".
A = Away; H = Home; W = Win; D = Draw; L = Loss

==== Matches ====
Win Draw Loss

July 27, 2017 1	Siah Jamegan	2 – 2	Zob Ahan	Mashhad
19:05 UTC+04:30	Hamam 🔴⚽ 19'; Badamaki 90'	Report	Ataya 31'; Karimi 47'	Stadium: Samen Al-Aeme Stadium; Attendance: 1.000; Referee: Hassan Akrami

August 4, 2017 2	Zob Ahan	3 – 0	Gostaresh Foulad	Isfahan
20:30 UTC+04:30	Sharifat 45'; Mohammadzadeh 69'; Rajabzadeh 76'	Report		Stadium: Foolad Shahr Stadium; Attendance: 500; Referee: Shahou Aslani

August 11, 2017 3	Paykan	0 – 0	Zob Ahan	Tehran
20:30 UTC+04:30		Report		Stadium: Shahr-e Qods Stadium; Attendance: 200; Referee: Hamid Haj Malek

August 17, 2017 4	Zob Ahan	0 – 2	Sepahan	Isfahan
20:15 UTC+04:30		Report	Ansari 82'; Alimohammadi 90'	Stadium: Foolad Shahr Stadium; Attendance: 4.500; Referee: Alireza Faghani

August 22, 2017 5	Sanat Naft	2 – 2	Zob Ahan	Abadan
20:30 UTC+04:30	Augusto César 78,90'	Report	Rajabzadeh 38'; Derakhshan Mehr 68'	Stadium: Takhti Stadium (Abadan); Attendance: 7.000; Referee: Hassan Akrami

September 15, 2017 6	Zob Ahan	6 – 0	Esteghlal Khuzestan	Isfahan
19:45 UTC+04:30	Tabrizi 13,46,65,90+3'; Hosseini 30,70'	Report		Stadium: Foolad Shahr Stadium; Attendance: 300; Referee: Javad Rahimzadeh

September 20, 2017 7	Esteghlal	1 – 1	Zob Ahan	Tehran
20:00 UTC+4:30	Cheshmi 12'	Report	Nejad Mehdi 78'	Stadium: Azadi Stadium; Attendance: 22.000; Referee: Payam Heydari

September 26, 2017 8	Zob Ahan	1 – 1	Saipa	Isfahan
18:20 UTC+4:30	Tabrizi 53'	Report	Kanaani (yellow card) 82'	Stadium: Foolad Shahr Stadium; Attendance: 500; Referee: Mehdi Seyedali

October 13, 2017 9	Padideh	2 – 2	Zob Ahan	Mashhad
17:30 UTC+4:30	Kiros Stanlley 9'; Hosseini 22'	Report	Hosseini 45'; Ghazi 65'	Stadium: Samen Al-Aeme Stadium; Attendance: 5.000; Referee: Ashkan Khorshidi

October 20, 2017 10	Zob Ahan	0 – 3	Pars Jonoubi	Isfahan
17:50 UTC+04:30		Report	Zobeydi 41'; Sing 82'; Pour Amini 90+1'	Stadium: Naghsh-e-Jahan Stadium; Attendance: 2.000; Referee: Seyed Hossein Zargar

October 31, 2017 11	Tractor Sazi	0 – 0	Zob Ahan	Tabriz
15:30 UTC+4:30		Report		Stadium: Yadegar-e Emam Stadium; Attendance: 5,000; Referee: Koopal Nazemi

November 20, 2017 12	Sepidrood	1 – 2	Zob Ahan	Rasht
14:30 UTC+4:30	Ferdousi 76'	Report	Hamam 67'; Esmaeilifar 90+2'	Stadium: Sardar Jangal Stadium; Attendance: 3,000; Referee: Reza Kermanshahi

November 25, 2017 13	Zob Ahan	0 – 1	Foolad	Isfahan
15:00 UTC+04:30		Report	Ashouri 79'	Stadium: Naghsh-e-Jahan Stadium; Attendance: 200; Referee: Vahid Kazemi

December 1, 2017 14	Persepolis	4 – 0	Zob Ahan	Tehran
15:00 UTC+04:30	Alipour 22'; Kamyabinia 35'; Mensha 70'; Ahmadzadeh 79'	Report		Stadium: Azadi Stadium; Attendance: 30,000; Referee: Hossein Zahedifar

December 6, 2017 15	Zob Ahan	2 – 0	Naft Tehran	Isfahan
15:15 UTC+04:30	Kiros Stanlley 78'; Morteza Tabrizi 90'	Report		Stadium: Naghsh-e-Jahan Stadium; Attendance: 700; Referee: Ali Safaei

December 22, 2017 16	Zob Ahan	0 – 0	Siah Jamegan	Isfahan
14:30 UTC+04:30		Report		Stadium: Naghsh-e-Jahan Stadium; Attendance: 900; Referee: Javad Rahimzadeh

December 29, 2017 17	Gostaresh Foulad	0 – 1	Zob Ahan	Tabriz
14:30 UTC+04:30		Report	Mohammadreza Abbasi 90+2'	Stadium: Gostaresh Foulad Stadium; Attendance: 100; Referee: Komeil Gholami

January 5, 2018 18	Zob Ahan	2 – 1	Paykan	Isfahan
15:00 UTC+04:30	Tabrizi 12'; Fakhreddini 63'	Report	Barani 55'	Stadium: Naghsh-e-Jahan Stadium; Attendance: 3,000; Referee: Seyed Mehdi Marjanzadeh

January 12, 2018 19	Sepahan	1 – 2	Zob Ahan	Isfahan
15:00 UTC+04:30	Fakhreddini 11'; Tabrizi 88'	Report	Ansari 90+3'	Stadium: Naghsh-e-Jahan Stadium; Attendance: 15,000; Referee: Ashkan Khorshidi

January 18, 2018 20	Zob Ahan	2 – 1	Sanat Naft	Isfahan
15:00 UTC+04:30	Kiros Stanlley 51'; Tabrizi 90+2'	Report	Luciano Pereira 89'	Stadium: Foolad Shahr Stadium; Attendance: 1,000; Referee: Hossein Zahedifar

January 24, 2018 21	Esteghlal Khuzestan	0 – 2	Zob Ahan	Ahvaz
15:00 UTC+04:30		Report	Abbasi 81'; Morteza Tabrizi 83'	Stadium: Takhti Stadium(Ahvaz); Attendance: 300; Referee: Hassan Akrami

February 4, 2018 22	Zob Ahan	2 – 1	Esteghlal	Isfahan
15:00 UTC+04:30	Kiros Stanlley 61'; Hosseini 90+1'	Report	Ghafouri 8'	Stadium: Foolad Shahr Stadium; Attendance: 15,000; Referee: Hamid Haj Malek

February 8, 2018 23	Saipa	4 – 2	Zob Ahan	Tehran
16:00 UTC+04:30	Torabi 16'; Daneshgar 39'; Gholizadeh 73'; Jafari 84'	Report	Kiros Stanlley 10'; Haddadifar 90+2'	Stadium: Shahid Dastgerdi Stadium; Attendance: 200; Referee: Ashkan Khorshidi

February 24, 2018 24	Zob Ahan	2 – 1	Padideh	Isfahan
15:30 UTC+04:30	Kiros Stanlley 20'; Tabrizi 90+2'	Report	Sadeghi 41'	Stadium: Foolad Shahr Stadium; Attendance: 1,000; Referee: Mohammadreza Akbarian

March 1, 2018 25	Pars Jonoubi	0 – 0	Zob Ahan	Tabriz
15:00 UTC+04:30		Report		Stadium: Takhti Jam; Attendance: 1,000; Referee: Hamid Haj malek

March 30, 2018 26	Zob Ahan	3 – 0	Tractor Sazi	Isfahan
17:00 UTC+04:30	Hosseini 5'; Tabrizi 80,89'	Report		Stadium: Foolad Shahr Stadium; Attendance: 1,500; Referee: Bijan Heydari

April 7, 2018 27	Zob Ahan	3 – 0	Sepidrood	Isfahan
17:00 UTC+04:30	Fakhreddini 23'; Kiros Stanlley 68'; Rahmani 90'	Report		Stadium: Foolad Shahr Stadium; Attendance: 2,000; Referee: Hossein Zahedifar

April 12, 2018 28	Foolad	1 – 1	Zob Ahan	Ahvaz
17:00 UTC+04:30	Zohaivi 31'	Report	Hosseini 45'	Stadium: Ghadir Stadium; Attendance: 2,000; Referee: Mehdi Seyedali

April 22, 2018 29	Zob Ahan	2 – 1	Persepolis	Isfahan
18:00 UTC+04:30	Fakhreddini 70'; Kiros Stanlley 87'	Report	Alipour 48'	Stadium: Foolad Shahr Stadium; Attendance: 12,000; Referee: Seyed Hossein Zargar

April 27, 2018 30	Naft Tehran	0 – 1	Zob Ahan	Tehran
17:00 UTC+04:30		Report	Kiros Stanlley 38'	Stadium: Takhti Stadium (Tehran); Attendance: 200; Referee: Ali Safaei

== AFC Champions League ==
=== Play-off round ===
30 January 2018	Zob Ahan (Iran)	3–1	(India) Aizawl	Foolad Shahr Stadium, Isfahan
17:00 UTC+3:30	Rajabzadeh 3' (pen.); Tabrizi 83', 90+3'	Live Report	Ionescu 21'	Attendance: 3,000; Referee: Nivon Robesh Gamini (Sri Lanka)

=== Group B ===
Pos	Team	Pld	W	D	L	GF	GA	GD	Pts	Qualification
1	(Qatar) Al-Duhail	6	6	0	0	13	6	+7	18	Advance to knockout stage
2	(Iran) Zob Ahan	6	2	1	3	6	8	−2	7 (Note: Head-to-head results: Zob Ahan 2–0 Lokomotiv Tashkent, Lokomotiv Tashkent 1–1 Zob Ahan.)	Advance to knockout stage
3	(Uzbekistan) Lokomotiv Tashkent	6	2	1	3	13	9	+4	7	
4	(United Arab Emirates) Al-Wahda	6	1	0	5	6	15	−9	3	

Source: AFC
Rules for classification: Group stage tiebreakers
Notes:

12 February 2018	Al-Duhail (Qatar)	3–1	(Iran) Zob Ahan	Abdullah bin Khalifa Stadium, Doha
16:15 UTC+3	Boudiaf 74', 76'; Msakni 84'	Live Report	Kiros 12'	Attendance: 2,150; Referee: Ryuji Sato (Japan)

19 February 2018	Zob Ahan (Iran)	2–0	(Uzbekistan) Lokomotiv Tashkent	Foolad Shahr Stadium, Isfahan
16:00 UTC+3:30	Tabrizi 47'; Hosseini 90+2'	Live Report		Attendance: 1,764; Referee: Fu Ming (China)

6 March 2018	Zob Ahan (Iran)	2–0	(United Arab Emirates) Al-Wahda	Foolad Shahr Stadium, Isfahan
16:00 UTC+3:30	Tabrizi 34', 73'	Live Report		Attendance: 3,114; Referee: Adham Makhadmeh (Jordan)

12 March 2018	Al-Wahda (United Arab Emirates)	3–0	(Iran) Zob Ahan	Zayed Sports City Stadium, Abu Dhabi
19:00 UTC+4	Tagliabué 45+1'; Batna 57'; Al-Akbari 65'	Live Report		Attendance: 1,839; Referee: Jarred Gillett (Australia)

3 April 2018	Zob Ahan (Iran)	0–1	(Qatar) Al-Duhail	Foolad Shahr Stadium, Isfahan
18:45 UTC+4:30		Live Report	Mohammad 84'	Attendance: 4,760; Referee: Nivon Robesh Gamini (Sri Lanka)

17 April 2018	Lokomotiv Tashkent (Uzbekistan)	1–1	(Iran) Zob Ahan	Lokomotiv Stadium, Tashkent
19:00 UTC+5	Tukhtakhodjaev 90'	Live Report	Tabrizi 25'	Attendance: 4,212; Referee: Ko Hyung-jin (South Korea)

=== Round of 16 ===
8 May 2018	Zob Ahan (Iran)	1–0	(Iran) Esteghlal	Foolad Shahr Stadium, Isfahan
19:15 UTC+4:30	Gvelesiani 90+3' (pen.)	Live Report		Attendance: 10,160; Referee: Jumpei Iida (Japan)

15 May 2018	Esteghlal (Iran)	3–1 (3–2 agg.)	(Iran) Zob Ahan	Azadi Stadium, Tehran
20:45 UTC+4:30	Thiam 11' (pen.), 41', 64'	Live Report	Haddadifar 65'	Attendance: 75,680; Referee: Ahmed Al-Kaf (Oman)

=== Hazfi Cup ===
==== Matches ====
Win Draw Loss

===== Round of 32 =====
8 September 2017 1/16	Zob Ahan	1–1 (2–4 p)	Fajr Sepasi	Fooladshahr
18:45 DST+04:30	M. Nejad Mehdi 4'		M. Nazari 32'	Stadium: Foolad Shahr Stadium

== Statistics ==
=== Appearances ===
No.	Pos	Nat	Player	Total		Pro League		AFC Champions League		Hazfi Cup	
No.	Pos	Nat	Player	Apps	Goals	Apps	Goals	Apps	Goals	Apps	Goals
1	GK	(Iran) IRN	Mohammad Bagher Sadeghi	0	0	0+0	0	0+0	0	0+0	0
2	DF	(Iran) IRN	Mohammad Nejad Mehdi	37	3	28+1	2	0+0	0	8+0	1
3	DF	(Iran) IRN	Vahid Mohammadzadeh	35	1	23+4	1	5+3	0	0+0	0
4	MF	(Iran) IRN	Akbar Imani	9	0	5+1	0	2+1	0	0+0	0
5	MF	(Georgia (country)) GEO	Giorgi Gvelesiani	29	1	19+1	0	9+0	1	0+0	0
6	MF	(Iran) IRN	Mehdi Mehdipour	10	0	8+1	0	0+0	0	1+0	0
7	MF	(Iran) IRN	Mohammad Reza Hosseini	36	7	26+0	6	9+0	1	1+0	0
8	MF	(Iran) IRN	Ghasem Hadadifar	24	2	5+10	1	5+4	1	0+0	0
9	MF	(Lebanon) LBN	Rabih Ataya	26	1	7+13	1	0+6	0	0+0	0
10	MF	(Iran) IRN	Ehsan Pahlevan	13	0	11+1	0	0+0	0	1+0	0
11	FW	(Iran) IRN	Morteza Tabrizi	40	19	27+3	13	9+0	6	1+0	0
12	GK	(Iran) IRN	Mohammad Rashid Mazaheri	40	0	30+0	0	9+0	0	1+0	0
17	MF	(Iran) IRN	Mohammadreza Abbasi	14	2	6+6	2	0+2	0	0+0	0
19	DF	(Lebanon) LBN	Ali Hamam	7	2	3+4	2	0+0	0	0+0	0
20	MF	(Iran) IRN	Esmaeil Sharifat	12	1	9+2	1	0+0	0	0+1	0
21	MF	(Iran) IRN	Bakhtiar Rahmani	22	1	10+3	1	7+2	0	0+0	0
23	MF	(Iran) IRN	Danial Esmaeilifar	15	1	14+0	1	0+0	0	1+0	0
24	DF	(Iran) IRN	Mehran Derakhshan Mehr	10	1	8+1	1	0+0	0	1+0	0
27	FW	(Iran) IRN	Iman Mousavi	7	0	0+6	0	0+0	0	1+0	0
28	FW	(Iran) IRN	Ali Khodadadi	0	0	0+0	0	0+0	0	0+0	0
30	MF	(Iran) IRN	Mehdi Rajabzadeh	25	3	4+14	2	1+6	1	0+0	0
31	DF	(Iran) IRN	Mohammad Amini	5	0	2+3	0	0+0	0	0+0	0
33	DF	(Iran) IRN	Mohammad Sattari	24	0	17+2	0	3+1	0	0+1	0
39	MF	(Iran) IRN	Hassan Karimi	0	0	0+0	0	0+0	0	0+0	0
44	GK	(Iran) IRN	Meraj Esmaeili	0	0	0+0	0	0+0	0	0+0	0
66	DF	(Iran) IRN	Khaled Shafiei	14	0	6+2	0	6+0	0	0+0	0
69	DF	(Iran) IRN	Milad Fakhreddini	23	4	13+1	4	9+0	0	0+0	0
88	MF	(Iran) IRN	Hamid Bou Hamdan	38	0	29+0	0	9+0	0	0+0	0
99	FW	(Brazil) BRA	Kiros Stanlley	30	10	21+0	9	9+0	1	0+0	0

=== Top scorers ===
Includes all competitive matches. The list is sorted by shirt number when total goals are equal.

Last updated on 15 May 2018

Ranking	Position	Nation	Name	Pro League	Champions League	Hazfi Cup	Total
1	FW	(Iran)	Morteza Tabrizi	13	6	0	19
2	FW	(Brazil)	Kiros Stanlley	9	1	0	10
3	MF	(Iran)	Mohammad Reza Hosseini	6	1	0	7
4	DF	(Iran)	Milad Fakhreddini	4	0	0	4
5	DF	(Iran)	Mohammad Nejad Mehdi	2	0	1	3
5	MF	(Iran)	Mehdi Rajabzadeh	2	1	0	3

Friendlies and pre-season goals are not recognized as competitive match goals.

=== Top assistors ===
Includes all competitive matches. The list is sorted by shirt number when total assistors are equal.

Last updated on 14 May 2018

Ranking	Position	Nation	Name	Pro League	Champions League	Hazfi Cup	Total
1	MF	(Iran)	Mohammad Reza Hosseini	5	5	0	10
2	FW	(Lebanon)	Rabih Ataya	7	0	0	7
2	FW	(Iran)	Morteza Tabrizi	6	1	0	7
4	DF	(Lebanon)	Milad Fakhreddini	3	1	0	4

Friendlies and Pre season goals are not recognized as competitive match assist.

=== Disciplinary record ===
Includes all competitive matches. Players with 1 card or more included only.

Last updated on 15 May 2018

				2017–18 Iran Pro League			AFC Champions League			Hazfi Cup			Total		
Position	Nation	Number	Name	Booked	(yellow card) (yellow-red card)	Sent off (straight red)	Booked	(yellow card) (yellow-red card)	Sent off (straight red)	Booked	(yellow card) (yellow-red card)	Sent off (straight red)	Booked	(yellow card) (yellow-red card)	Sent off (straight red)
1	(Georgia (country))	5	Giorgi Gvelesiani	6	0	0	1	0	0	0	0	0	7	0	0
2	(Iran)	88	Hamid Bou Hamdan	5	0	0	1	0	0	0	0	0	6	0	0
2	(Brazil)	5	Kiros Stanlley	5	0	0	1	0	0	0	0	0	6	0	0
3	(Iran)	7	Mohammad Reza Hosseini	5	0	0	0	0	0	0	0	0	5	0	0
3	(Iran)	2	Mohammad Nejad Mehdi	5	0	0	0	0	0	0	0	0	5	0	0
4	(Iran)	33	Vahid Mohammadzadeh	3	0	0	0	0	0	0	0	0	3	0	0
4	(Iran)	69	Milad Fakhreddini	3	0	0	0	0	0	0	0	0	3	0	0
5	(Iran)	12	Mohammad Rashid Mazaheri	1	0	0	1	0	0	1	0	0	2	0	0
5	(Iran)	8	Ghasem Haddadifar	1	0	0	1	0	0	0	0	0	2	0	0
6	(Iran)	11	Morteza Tabrizi	1	0	0	0	0	0	0	0	0	1	0	0
6	(Iran)	24	Mehran Derakhshan Mehr	1	0	0	0	0	0	0	0	0	1	0	0
6	(Iran)	66	Khaled Shafiei	1	0	0	0	0	0	0	0	0	1	0	0
6	(Iran)	33	Mohammad Sattari	1	0	0	0	0	0	0	0	0	1	0	0
6	(Iran)	21	Bakhtiar Rahmani	1	0	0	0	0	0	0	0	0	1	0	0
6	(Iran)	4	Akbar Imani	1	0	0	0	0	0	0	0	0	1	0	0
6	(Lebanon)	9	Rabih Ataya	1	0	0	0	0	0	0	0	0	1	0	0
6	(Iran)	20	Esmaeil Sharifat	0	1	0	0	0	0	0	0	0	0	1	0

=== Goals conceded ===
- Updated on 30 May 2016

Position	Nation	Number	Name	Pro League	Champions League	Hazfi Cup	Total	Clean Sheets
GK	(Iran)	1	Mohammad Bagher Sadeghi	0	0	0	0	0
GK	(Iran)	12	Mohammad Rashid Mazaheri	30	9	1	40	15
TOTALS				30	9	1	40	15

=== Own goals ===
- Updated on 5 January 2016

Position	Nation	Number	Name	Pro League	Champions League	Hazfi Cup	Total
DF	(Lebanon)	19	Ali Hamam	1	0	0	1

== Club ==
=== Coaching staff ===
Position	Name
Head coach	(Iran) Amir Ghalenoei
Assistant coach	(Portugal) Rodolfo Correa
Goalkeeping coach	(Portugal) Rui Tavares
Fitness coach	TBD
Physiotherapist	(Iran) Abbas Moradi
Analyzer	(Iran) Reza Nasr Esfahani
Doctor	(Iran) Amir Hossein Sharifianpour
Logistics	(Iran) Mahmoud Mehruyan
Team director	(Iran) Ali Shojaei

=== Other information ===
Chairman	(Iran) Saeed Azari
Ground (capacity and dimensions)	Foolad Shahr Stadium (20,000 / )

Updated to match played 4 January 2016

== See also ==
- 2017–18 Persian Gulf Pro League
- 2017–18 Hazfi Cup
- 2018 AFC Champions League
