= 2015–16 Zob Ahan F.C. season =

Zob Ahan Isfahan FC
2015–16 season
- Chairman: Saeid Azari
- Manager: Yahya Golmohammadi
- Stadium: Foolad Shahr Stadium, Fooladshahr
- IPL: 6th
- Hazfi Cup: Winners
- AFC Champions League: 2016: 1/8 Final
- Top goalscorer: League: Morteza Tabrizi (7 goals); All: Morteza Tabrizi (10 goals)
- Highest home attendance: 8,000 v Persepolis (7 February 2016)
- Lowest home attendance: 350 v Malavan (26 December 2015)
Home colours	Away colours	Third colours

The 2015–16 season was Zob Ahan Football Club's 15th season in the Iran Pro League, and their 20th consecutive season in the top division of Iranian football. They also competed in the Hazfi Cup and AFC Champions League, and had their 45nd year in existence as a football club.

== Players ==
=== First-team squad ===
As of 30 May 2016.

Out for Injuries	Released – Retired

No.	Name	Nationality	Position (s)	Since	Date of birth (age)	Signed from	Ends	Games	Goals
Goalkeepers
1	Mohammad Bagher Sadeghi	(Iran)	GK	2014	April 1, 1989 (age 36)	(Youth system) (Iran) Saipa	2016	50	0
12	Mohammad Rashid Mazaheri	(Iran)	GK	2014	May 18, 1989 (age 36)	(Iran) Foolad	2018	65	0
40	Peyman Salmani	(Iran)	GK	2012	April 18, 1994 (age 31)	(Youth system)	2016	1	0
Defenders
2	Mohammad Nejad Mehdi	(Iran)	DF	2015	October 20, 1992 (age 33)	(Iran) Padideh	2018	26	1
3	Walid Ismail	(Lebanon)	LB	2014	November 11, 1984 (age 41)	(Lebanon) Nejmeh	2016	31	0
4	Hadi Mohammadi	(Iran)	DF	2014	March 8, 1991 (age 34)	(Iran) Damash	2018	67	4
18	Ali Hamam	(Lebanon)	RB	2014	August 25, 1986 (age 39)	(Lebanon) Nejmeh	2016	65	1
19	Mehrdad Ghanbari	(Iran)	LB	2014	November 22, 1989 (age 36)	(Iran) Padideh	2018	46	3
20	Hojjat Haghverdi	(Iran)	DF	2014	February 3, 1993 (age 32)	(Iran) Aboumoslem	2017	20	0
21	Saeb Mohebi	(Iran)	RB	2014	August 28, 1993 (age 32)	(Iran) Caspian Qazvin	2018	9	0
26	Nima Taheri	(Iran)	DF	2016	November 5, 1996 (age 29)	(Youth system)	2018	0	0
36	Kianoush Eghbali	(Iran)	DF	2015	April 6, 1996 (age 29)	(Youth system)	2018	0	0
33	Vahid Mohammadzadeh	(Iran)	DF	2016	May 16, 1989 (age 36)	(Iran) Saipa	2018	13	1
61	Hashem Beikzadeh	(Iran)	LB	2016	January 22, 1984 (age 42)	(Iran) Saba Qom	2017	11	1
Midfielders
~~5~~	~~Akbar Sadeghi~~	(Iran)	~~DM, CM~~	2015	~~March 11, 1985 (age 40)~~	~~(Iran) Padideh~~	~~2016~~	~~18~~	~~1~~
8	Ghasem Hadadifar	(Iran)	MF	2003	July 12, 1983 (age 42)	(Youth system)	2016	315	18
11	Morteza Tabrizi	(Iran)	RM, ST	2013	January 6, 1991 (age 35)	(Iran) Pas Hamedan	2017	100	20
13	Mohammad Reza Hosseini	(Iran)	RM	2015	September 15, 1989 (age 36)	(Iran) Fajr Sepasi	2018	22	1
15	Ehsan Pahlavan	(Iran)	LM	2013	July 25, 1993 (age 32)	(Iran) Gostaresh Foulad	2017	81	9
16	Mehdi Mehdipour	(Iran)	MF	2014	February 18, 1994 (age 31)	(Youth system) (Iran) Rah Ahan	2018	46	3
23	Danial Esmaeilifar	(Iran)	RM, RB	2014	February 26, 1993 (age 32)	(Iran) Payam Sanat	2018	51	5
24	Reza Shekari	(Iran)	AM	2015	May 31, 1998 (age 27)	(Iran) Moghavemat Tehran	2018	13	1
25	Mohammadreza Abbasi	(Iran)	LM	2014	July 27, 1996 (age 29)	(Youth system)	2018	20	1
32	Mehran Derakhshan Mehr	(Iran)	MF	2015	August 10, 1998 (age 27)	(Youth system)	2018	0	0
35	Kamran Momeni	(Iran)	MF	2015	December 1, 1995 (age 30)	(Youth system)	2018	0	0
77	Ahmad Amir Kamdar	(Iran)	MF	2015	January 5, 1989 (age 37)	(Iran) Siah Jamegan	2017	13	1
Forwards
7	Masoud Hassanzadeh	(Iran)	ST	2014	April 12, 1991 (age 34)	(Iran) Damash	2018	56	17
9	Kaveh Rezaei	(Iran)	ST	2014	April 5, 1992 (age 33)	(Iran) Saipa	2016	45	14
~~17~~	~~Marco Aurélio Iubel~~	(Brazil)	~~ST~~	2016	~~August 7, 1986 (age 39)~~	~~(Brazil) Cuiabá~~	~~2016~~	~~7~~	~~0~~
30	Mehdi Rajabzadeh	(Iran)	SS	2012	June 21, 1978 (age 47)	(Iran) Fajr Sepasi	2017	283	89

=== Iran Pro League squad ===
As of 19 January 2016 Note: Flags indicate national team as defined under FIFA eligibility rules; some limited exceptions apply. Players may hold more than one non-FIFA nationality.

No.	Pos.	Nation	Player
1	GK	IRN	Mohammad Bagher Sadeghi
2	DF	IRN	Mohammad Nejad Mehdi
3	DF	LBN	Walid Ismail
4	DF	IRN	Hadi Mohammadi
7	FW	IRN	Masoud Hassanzadeh
8	MF	IRN	Ghasem Hadadifar (Captain)
9	FW	IRN	Kaveh Rezaei
11	FW	IRN	Morteza Tabrizi
12	GK	IRN	Mohammad Rashid Mazaheri
13	FW	IRN	Mohammad Reza Hosseini
15	MF	IRN	Ehsan Pahlevan ^{U23}
16	MF	IRN	Mehdi Mehdipour ^{U23}
18	DF	LBN	Ali Hamam
19	DF	IRN	Mehrdad Ghanbari
20	DF	IRN	Hojjat Haghverdi ^{U23}

No.	Pos.	Nation	Player
21	DF	IRN	Saeb Mohebi ^{U23}
23	FW	IRN	Danial Esmaeilifar ^{U23}
24	MF	IRN	Reza Shekari ^{U21}
25	FW	IRN	Mohammadreza Abbasi ^{U21}
26	DF	IRN	Nima Taheri ^{U21}
28	FW	IRN	Ali Khodadadi ^{U21}
30	FW	IRN	Mehdi Rajabzadeh (Vice captain)
31	FW	IRN	Hamidreza Jafari ^{U21}
32	MF	IRN	Mehran Derakhshan Mehr ^{U21}
33	DF	IRN	Vahid Mohammadzadeh
35	MF	IRN	Kamran Momeni ^{U21}
36	DF	IRN	Kianoush Eghbali ^{U21}
40	GK	IRN	Peyman Salmani ^{U23}
61	DF	IRN	Hashem Beikzadeh
77	MF	IRN	Ahmad Amir Kamdar

== Transfers ==
Confirmed transfers 2015–16

=== Summer ===
In: Note: Flags indicate national team as defined under FIFA eligibility rules; some limited exceptions apply. Players may hold more than one non-FIFA nationality.

No.	Pos.	Nation	Player
5	MF	IRN	Akbar Sadeghi ^{PL} (from Padideh)
6	DF	IRN	Mohammad Nejad Mehdi ^{PL} (from Padideh)
24	MF	IRN	Reza Shekari (from Moghavemat Tehran)
13	FW	IRN	Mohammad Reza Hosseini (from Fajr Sepasi)
36	DF	IRN	Kianoush Eghbali (promoted from Academy)
32	MF	IRN	Mehran Derakhshan Mehr (promoted from Academy)
35	MF	IRN	Kamran Momeni (promoted from Academy)

Out: Note: Flags indicate national team as defined under FIFA eligibility rules; some limited exceptions apply. Players may hold more than one non-FIFA nationality.

No.	Pos.	Nation	Player
3	DF	BRA	Carlos Santos (to Naft Tehran)
13	DF	IRN	Pouria Seifpanahi (to Machine Shahrdari Tabriz)
4	MF	IRN	Akbar Imani (to Foolad)
5	MF	IRN	Ghasem Dehnavi (to Saba Qom)
7	MF	IRN	Mohsen Mosalman (to Persepolis, previously on loan at Foolad)
10	FW	IRN	Esmaeil Farhadi (Released)
32	FW	IRN	Amin Nasiri (to Gitipasand)
34	MF	IRN	Mohammadreza Baouj (Released)
36	FW	IRN	Farshad Mohammadi (to Gitipasand)

=== Winter ===
In: Note: Flags indicate national team as defined under FIFA eligibility rules; some limited exceptions apply. Players may hold more than one non-FIFA nationality.

No.	Pos.	Nation	Player
26	DF	IRN	Nima Taheri (promoted from Academy)
17	FW	BRA	Marco Aurélio Iubel (from (Brazil) Cuiabá)
77	MF	IRN	Ahmad Amir Kamdar (from Siahjamegan)
33	DF	IRN	Vahid Mohammadzadeh (from Saipa)
61	DF	IRN	Hashem Beikzadeh (from Saba Qom)
31	FW	IRN	Hamidreza Jafari (promoted from Academy)

Out: Note: Flags indicate national team as defined under FIFA eligibility rules; some limited exceptions apply. Players may hold more than one non-FIFA nationality.

No.	Pos.	Nation	Player
5	MF	IRN	Akbar Sadeghi (to Saba Qom)

== Competitions ==
=== Overview ===
Competition	Started round	Current position / round	Final position / round	First match	Last match
Persian Gulf Pro League	—	—	6th	29 July 2015	13 May 2016
AFC Champions League	Group stage	—	1/8 Final	23 February 2015	25 May 2016
Hazfi Cup	Round of 32	—	Winners	11 September 2015	29 May 2016

Updated to match played 15 May 2016
Source: Competitions

=== Iran Pro League ===
==== Standings ====
Pos	Team	Pld	W	D	L	GF	GA	GD	Pts	Qualification or relegation
4	Tractor Sazi	30	13	12	5	43	27	+16	51	
5	Naft Tehran	30	13	10	7	30	21	+9	49	
6	Zob Ahan	30	11	13	6	38	26	+12	46	Qualification for the 2017 AFC Champions League group stage (Note: Zob Ahan secured qualification for the 2017 AFC Champions League through winning the 2015–16 Hazfi Cup.)
7	Saba Qom	30	9	15	6	30	24	+6	42	
8	Saipa	30	11	7	12	28	31	−3	40	

Updated to match(es) played on 13 May 2016. Source: IPL Stats
Rules for classification: 1) points; 2) goal difference; 3) number of goals scored.

==== Results summary ====
Overall								Home						Away					
Pld	W	D	L	GF	GA	GD	Pts	W	D	L	GF	GA	GD	W	D	L	GF	GA	GD
30	11	13	6	38	26	+12	46	4	8	3	17	11	+6	7	5	3	21	15	+6

Last updated: 15 May 2016.
Source: Ipl Stats

==== Results by round ====
Round	1	2	3	4	5	6	7	8	9	10	11	12	13	14	15	16	17	18	19	20	21	22	23	24	25	26	27	28	29	30
Ground	A	H	A	A	H	A	H	A	H	A	H	A	H	A	H	H	A	H	H	A	H	A	H	A	H	A	H	A	H	A
Result	L	L	W	W	D	W	D	W	D	D	W	D	W	W	L	W	D	D	D	D	D	W	D	L	L	D	D	W	W	L
Position	15	16	8	6	5	4	5	4	4	3	3	3	3	3	3	3	3	3	3	4	4	3	4	4	6	6	6	6	6	6

Updated to match(es) played on 15 May 2016. Source: "Ipl".
A = Away; H = Home; W = Win; D = Draw; L = Loss

==== Matches ====
Win Draw Loss

July 29, 2015 1	Malavan	1–0	Zob Ahan	Anzali
18:50 UTC+04:30	Afshin 61'; Afshin (yellow card) 61'	Report	Hamam (yellow card) 55'	Stadium: Takhti Stadium; Attendance: 4.656; Referee: Toraj Haghverdi

August 7, 2015 2	Zob Ahan	0–1	Sepahan	Isfahan
21:00 UTC+04:30	Nejad Mehdi (yellow card) 60'	Report	Karimi 73'	Stadium: Foolad Shahr Stadium; Attendance: 6.000; Referee: Mohsen Ghahramani

August 14, 2015 3	Esteghlal	0–2	Zob Ahan	Tehran
19:20 UTC+04:30	Mkoyan (yellow card) 39'; Karimi (yellow card) 88'	Report	Pahlavan 61'; Tabrizi 85'; Tabrizi (yellow card) 85'; Mazaheri (yellow card) 92'	Stadium: Azadi Stadium; Attendance: 35.000; Referee: Yadollah Jahanbazi

August 20, 2015 4	Perspolis	1–2	Zob Ahan	Tehran
19:15 UTC+04:30	Ahmadzadeh (yellow card) 49'; Alishah 64'; Bengar (yellow card) 90+2'; Bengar (red card)	Report	Rezaei 76'; Hassanzadeh (penalty scored)	Stadium: Azadi Stadium; Attendance: 25.000; Referee: Alireza Faghani

August 26, 2015 5	Zob Ahan	0–0	Esteghlal Ahvaz	Isfahan
19:10 UTC+04:30		Report	Karimi (yellow card) 16'	Stadium: Foolad Shahr Stadium; Attendance: 1.500; Referee: Mehdi Seyedali

September 15, 2015 6	Foolad	0–3	Zob Ahan	Ahvaz
18:45 UTC+04:30	Mesarić (yellow card) 22'; Chago (yellow card) 45'; Sharifat (yellow card) 50'	Report	Mohammadi 28'; Pahlavan 37'; Sadeghi (yellow card) 59'; Noormohammadi 72'	Stadium: Ghadir Stadium; Attendance: 0 Referee: Reza Kermanshahi

September 26, 2015 7	Zob Ahan	0–0	Naft Tehran	Isfahan
17:30 UTC+4:30		Report	Koroushi (yellow card) 87'	Stadium: Foolad Shahr Stadium; Attendance: 800; Referee: Moud Bonyadifar

October 16, 2015 8	Saipa	0–1	Zob Ahan	Tehran
15:45 UTC+4:30	Moshkelpour (yellow card) 15'; Alinejad (yellow card) 41'; Nekounam (yellow card) 55'	Report	Hassanzadeh 17'; Mohammadi (yellow card) 70'	Stadium: Shahid Dastgerdi Stadium; Attendance: 300; Referee: Saeid Bakhshizadeh

October 21, 2015 9	Zob Ahan	0–0	Gostaresh Foulad	Isfahan
16:45 UTC+4:30	Tabrizi (yellow card) 78'	Report	Kiani (yellow card) 33'; Magno Batista (yellow card) 84'	Stadium: Foolad Shahr Stadium; Attendance: 400; Referee: Mohammadreza Faghani

October 27, 2015 10	Tractor Sazi	4–4	Zob Ahan	Tabriz
15:30 UTC+4:30	Rafiei 17'; Rahmani 45,75'; Saghebi 55'; Saghebi (yellow card) 55'	Report	Pahlavan 27'; Mohammadi (yellow card) 30'; Hamam 80'; Rezaei 87'; Pahlavan (yellow card) 90+1'; Esmaeilifar 90+4'	Stadium: Yadegar-e Emam Stadium; Attendance: 2,500; Referee: Hossein Zargar

October 31, 2015 11	Zob Ahan	4–0	Rah Ahan	Isfahan
15:30 UTC+04:30	Rezaei 24,67'; Tabrizi 68'; Sadeghi 81'; Sadeghi (yellow card) 83'	Report	Abtahi (yellow card) 54'; Mohammadi (yellow card) 61'	Stadium: Foolad Shahr Stadium; Attendance: 520; Referee: Hamid Haj malek

November 20, 2015 12	Saba Qom	0–0	Zob Ahan	Qom
15:15 UTC+04:30	Ghazi (yellow card) 88'	Report	Haghverdi (yellow card) 34'; Rezaei (yellow card) 86'	Stadium: Yadegar-e Emam Stadium; Attendance: 2,500; Referee: Bijan Heidari

November 30, 2015 13	Zob Ahan	3–1	Padideh	Isfahan
15:15 UTC+04:30	Hassanzadeh 45,62'; Tabrizi 68'; Mehdipour (yellow card) 79'	Report	Yousefi 79'	Stadium: Foolad Shahr Stadium; Attendance: 500; Referee: Rohollah Sharifi

November 22, 2011 14	Siah Jamegan	0–1	Zob Ahan	Mashhad
14:30 UTC+04:30	Zamehran (yellow card) 75'; Mehdipour (yellow card) 78'; Hosseini (yellow card) 92'	Report	Hassanzadeh 45'; Mazaheri (yellow card) 72'	Stadium: Samen Stadium; Attendance: 200; Referee: Ali Safaei

December 18, 2015 15	Zob Ahan	0–1	Esteghlal Khuzestan	Isfahan
15:15 UTC+04:30	Hassanzadeh (yellow card) 35'	Report	Zobeydi 78'; Tayyebi (yellow card) 43'; Nassari (yellow card) 45'	Stadium: Foolad Shahr Stadium; Attendance: 1,900; Referee: Hamid Hajmalek

December 26, 2015 16	Zob Ahan	1–0	Malavan	Isfahan
15:30 UTC+04:30	Tabrizi 56'; Ismail (yellow card) 44'; Esmaeilifar (yellow card) 77'; Rezaei (yellow card) 90+2'	Report	Darvishi (yellow card) 90+1'	Stadium: Foolad Shahr Stadium; Attendance: 350; Referee: Mohammad Reza Akbarian

December 31, 2015 17	Sepahan	1–1	Zob Ahan	Isfahan
15:00 UTC+04:30	Khalatbari 41'; Karimi (yellow card) 48'; Musaev (yellow card) 60'; Karami (yellow card) 66'	Report	Pahlavan 14'; Mehdipour (yellow card) 58'; Hassanzadeh (yellow card) 60'; Pahlavan (yellow card) 70'	Stadium: Foolad Shahr Stadium; Attendance: 3,500; Referee: Hossein Zargar

February 2, 2016 18	Zob Ahan	0–0	Esteghlal	Isfahan
14:30 UTC+04:30	Beikzadeh (yellow card) 32'	Report	Hajmohammadi (yellow card) 33'; Rahmati (yellow card) 93'	Stadium: Foolad Shahr Stadium; Attendance: 6,500; Referee: Shahin Haji babaei

February 7, 2016 19	Zob Ahan	2–2	Perspolis	Isfahan
14:30 UTC+04:30	Beikzadeh (yellow card) 30'; Mazaheri (yellow card) 68'; Hassanzadeh (penalty scored); Tabrizi 90'	Report	Ahmadzadeh (yellow card) 30'; Alishah 35'; Kamyabinia (yellow card) 71'; Alipour 80'; Rezaeian (yellow card) 86'; Taremi (yellow card) 89'	Stadium: Foolad Shahr Stadium; Attendance: 8,000; Referee: Ashkan Khorshidi

February 13, 2016 20	Esteghlal Ahvaz	1–1	Zob Ahan	Ahvaz
15:00 UTC+04:30	Pakparvar (yellow card) 53'; Reykani 90+3'	Report	Rezaei 52'; Amir Kamdar (yellow card) 54'	Stadium: Takhti Stadium(Ahvaz); Attendance: 550; Referee: Javad Rahimzadeh

February 18, 2016 21	Zob Ahan	1–1	Foolad	Isfahan
16:00 UTC+04:30	Nejad Mehdi (yellow card) 56'; Rajabzadeh (penalty scored); Iubel (yellow card) 78'	Report	Ahle Shakheh 8'; Feshangchi (yellow card) 51'; Iubel (yellow card) 67'	Stadium: Foolad Shahr Stadium; Attendance: 1,000; Referee: Reza Mahdavi

March 6, 2016 22	Naft Tehran	0–1	Zob Ahan	Tehran
15:30 UTC+04:30	Amiri (yellow card) 35'; Bouazar (yellow card) 80'	Report	Mohammadi (yellow card) 27'; Amir Kamdar 38'; Mazaheri (yellow card) 62'	Stadium: Takhti Stadium(Tehran); Attendance: 130; Referee: Mehdi Marhanzadeh

March 10, 2016 23	Zob Ahan	1–1	Saipa	Isfahan
17:15 UTC+04:30	Rajabzadeh 30'; Haddadifar (yellow card) 68'; Esmaeilifar (yellow card) 86'	Report	Torabi 45'; Sadeghi (yellow card) 74'	Stadium: Foolad Shahr Stadium; Attendance: 200; Referee: Mohammad Hossein Zahedifar

March 31, 2016 24	Gostaresh Foulad	4–3	Zob Ahan	Tabriz
15:30 UTC+04:30	Magno Batista (yellow card) 12'; Ebrahimi 21,78,88'; Hosseini 30'; Leonardo Pimenta (yellow card) 80'; Koohnavard (yellow card) 87'	Report	Ehsan Pahlevan 6'; Mehdi Mehdipour (yellow card) 18' (goal) 37,48'; Hadi Mohammadi (yellow card) 65'; Ahmad Amir Kamdar (yellow card) 75'	Stadium: Gostaresh Foulad Stadium; Attendance: 2,000; Referee: Mohammadreza Akbarian

April 10, 2016 25	Zob Ahan	1–2	Tractor Sazi	Isfahan
16:30 UTC+04:30	Rajabzadeh 60'; Haddadifar (yellow card) 63'; Hadi Mohammadi (yellow card) 76'; Mohammad Reza Hosseini (yellow card) 89'	Report	Ashouri (yellow card) 24'; Carlos Cardoso (yellow card) 59'; Rahmani 69'; Shafiei 87' (yellow card) 87'; Shahin Saghebi (yellow card) 88'	Stadium: Foolad Shahr Stadium; Attendance: 2,300; Referee: Mooud Bonyadifar

April 14, 2016 26	Rah Ahan	1–1	Zob Ahan	Tehran
17:00 UTC+04:30	Mehdi Hanafi (yellow card) 32'; Mohammad Reza Soleimani 82'	Report	Vahid Mohammadzadeh (yellow card) 48'; Kaveh Rezaei 85'	Stadium: Rah Ahan Stadium; Attendance: 250; Referee: Rohollah Sharifi

April 24, 2016 27	Zob Ahan	1–1	Saba Qom	Isfahan
18:15 UTC+04:30	Morteza Tabrizi 13'	Report	Farshid Bagheri 54'	Stadium: Foolad Shahr Stadium; Attendance: 1,000; Referee: Mohammadreza Faghani

April 28, 2016 28	Padideh	0–1	Zob Ahan	Mashhad
18:00 UTC+04:30		Report	Mehdi Rajabzadeh 74'	Stadium: Samen Stadium; Attendance: 200; Referee: Mohammad Maleki

May 8, 2016 29	Zob Ahan	3–1	Siah Jamegan	Isfahan
18:00 UTC+04:30	Ali Hamam 58'; Mehdi Rajabzadeh 72,80'	Report	Hossein Karimi 40'	Stadium: Foolad Shahr Stadium; Attendance: 400; Referee: Yadollah Jahanbazi

May 13, 2016 30	Esteghlal Khuzestan	2–0	Zob Ahan	Ahvaz
18:00 UTC+04:30	Rahim Mehdi Zohaivi 55,59'	Report		Stadium: Ghadir Stadium; Attendance: 3500; Referee: Mohsen Torky

=== AFC Champions League ===
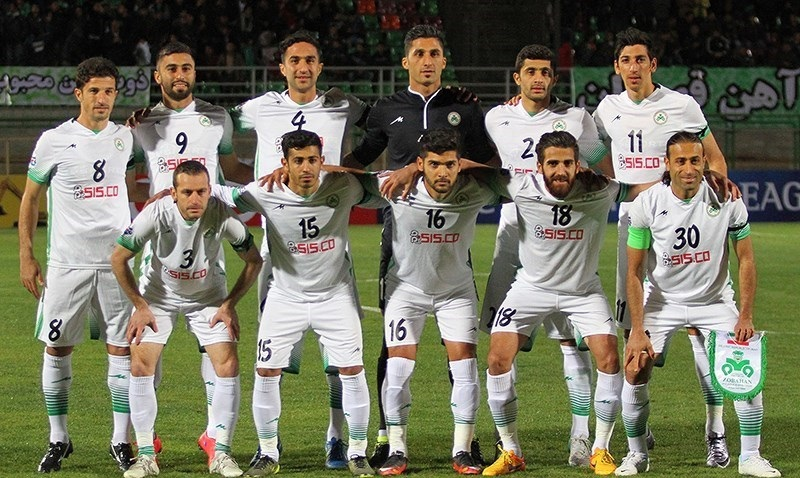
Zob Ahan team image before AFC Champions League match, 1 March 2016

==== Group B ====
Pos	Team	Pld	W	D	L	GF	GA	GD	Pts	Qualification	ZOB	LEK	NSR	BYD
1	(Iran) Zob Ahan	6	4	2	0	12	2	+10	14	Advance to knockout stage	—	0–0	3–0	5–2
2	(Qatar) Lekhwiya	6	2	3	1	7	2	+5	9	Advance to knockout stage	0–1	—	4–0	0–0
3	(Saudi Arabia) Al-Nassr	6	1	2	3	5	14	−9	5		0–3	1–1	—	3–3
4	(Uzbekistan) Bunyodkor	6	0	3	3	5	11	−6	3		0–0	0–2	0–1	—

Source: AFC
Rules for classification: Group stage tiebreakers
23 February 2016
18:15 UTC+3

Lekhwiya (Qatar)	0–1	(Iran) Zob Ahan
	Report	Rajabzadeh 46'

Abdullah bin Khalifa Stadium, Doha
Attendance: 1,225
Referee: Kim Jong-hyeok (South Korea)

1 March 2016
18:45 UTC+3:30

Zob Ahan (Iran)	0–0	(Qatar) Lekhwiya
	Report

Foolad Shahr Stadium, Isfahan
Attendance: 4,000
Referee: Yudai Yamamoto (Japan)

16 March 2016
18:00 UTC+5

Bunyodkor (Uzbekistan)	0–0	(Iran) Zob Ahan
	Report

Bunyodkor Stadium, Tashkent
Attendance: 4,567
Referee: Peter Green (Australia)

5 April 2016
20:00 UTC+4:30

Zob Ahan (Iran)	5–2	(Uzbekistan) Bunyodkor
Esmaeilifar 3'; Mohammadzadeh 34'; Rajabzadeh 50'; Rezaei 69'; Tabrizi 87'	Report	Zouaghi 78'; Nurmatov 89'

Foolad Shahr Stadium, Isfahan
Attendance: 4,523
Referee: Ma Ning (China)

20 April 2016
20:30 UTC+4

Zob Ahan (Iran)	3–0	(Saudi Arabia) Al-Nassr
Pahlavan 27', 83'; Rezaei 74'	Report

Sultan Qaboos Sports Complex, Muscat (Oman)
Attendance: 3,400
Referee: Ryuji Sato (Japan)

4 May 2016
21:15 UTC+4

Al-Nassr (Saudi Arabia)	0–3	(Iran) Zob Ahan
	Report	Pahlavan 30'; Hassanzadeh 41' (pen.); Beikzadeh 87'

Al-Rashid Stadium, Dubai (United Arab Emirates)
Referee: Muhammad Taqi (Singapore)

==== Round of 16 ====
18 May 2016
19:40 UTC+4

Al-Ain (United Arab Emirates)	1–1	(Iran) Zob Ahan
Douglas 9'	Report	Abbasi 75'

Hazza Bin Zayed Stadium, Al Ain
Attendance: 10,708
Referee: Kim Sang-woo (South Korea)
25 May 2016
20:45 UTC+4:30

Zob Ahan (Iran)	0–2	(United Arab Emirates) Al-Ain
	Report	Lee Myung-joo 12'; Asprilla 62'

Foolad Shahr Stadium, Isfahan
Attendance: 9,960
Referee: Kim Jong-hyeok (South Korea)

Al-Ain won 3–1 on aggregate.

=== Hazfi Cup ===
==== Matches ====
Win Draw Loss

===== Round of 32 =====
11 September 2015 1/16	Zob Ahan	2–1	Baderan Tehran	Fuladshahr
19:45	Nejad Mehdi 13'; Mehdipour 56'	Summary		Stadium: Foolad Shahr Stadium

===== Last 16 =====
21 September 2015 1/8	Gostaresh Foulad	0–1	Zob Ahan	Tabriz
16:00		Summary	Rajabzadeh 66'	Stadium: Gostaresh Foulad Stadium

===== Quarter-final =====
4 November 2015 1/4	Zob Ahan	2–0	Persepolis	Isfahan
14:30 (DST+03:30)	M. Tabrizi 107'; R. Shekari 115'	report		Stadium: Foolad Shahr Stadium; Attendance: 15,000; Referee: Yadollah Jahanbazi

==== Semi-final (1/2 Final – Last 4) ====
24 November 2015 1/2	Zob Ahan	2–2 (4–1 p)	Sepahan	Isfahan
14:30 (DST+03:30)	M. Tabrizi 2'; M.R. Hosseini 110'	report	V. Ghafouri 52', 113'	Stadium: Foolad Shahr Stadium; Attendance: 7,000; Referee: Mohsen Torky

=== Final ===
29 May 2016 79	Zob Ahan	1–1 (5–4 p)	Esteghlal	Khorramshahr
21:00 (DST+03:30)	Rahmati 20' (o.g.)	report	Ebrahimi 56' (pen.)	Stadium: Khorramshahr Stadium; Attendance: 15,000; Referee: Alireza Faghani

=== Friendly matches ===
Win Draw Loss

July 11, 2015 1	Fenerbahçe	7–0	Zob Ahan	Turkey
19:30 UTC+04:30	Fernandão 6'; Stoch 21'; Mehmet Topal 33,77'; Nani 65'; Souza 75'; Sow 79'	Report		Stadium: Dűzce Stadium; Attendance: 10.000; Referee: Sercan Tukat

13 January 2016 2	Zob Ahan	3–2	Sepahan	Isfahan
14:30 (DST+03:30)	Hassanzadeh 16'; Mehdipour 65'; Marquinho 88'	report	Luciano Pereira 27', 31'

23 January 2016 3	Zob Ahan	1–2	Saba Qom	Tehran
15:00	Rezaei 1'	report	Sadeghi 64', 76'	Stadium: Shahre Qods Stadium

25 January 2016 4	Zob Ahan	0–0 (2–3 p)	Saipa	Tehran
15:00		report		Stadium: Shahre Qods Stadium

== Statistics ==
=== Appearances ===
No.	Pos	Nat	Player	Total		Pro League		AFC Champions League		Hazfi Cup	
No.	Pos	Nat	Player	Apps	Goals	Apps	Goals	Apps	Goals	Apps	Goals
1	GK	(Iran) IRN	Mohammad Bagher Sadeghi	4	0	3+0	0	0+0	0	1+0	0
2	DF	(Iran) IRN	Mohammad Nejad Mehdi	26	1	20+0	0	4+0	0	2+0	1
3	DF	(Lebanon) LBN	Walid Ismail	26	0	18+0	0	3+0	0	4+1	0
4	DF	(Iran) IRN	Hadi Mohammadi	35	1	24+0	1	6+0	0	5+0	0
5	MF	(Iran) IRN	Akbar Sadeghi	18	1	14+1	1	0+0	0	3+0	0
7	FW	(Iran) IRN	Masoud Hassanzadeh	28	7	11+8	6	1+4	1	2+2	0
8	MF	(Iran) IRN	Ghasem Hadadifar	36	0	23+1	0	8+0	0	3+1	0
9	FW	(Iran) IRN	Kaveh Rezaei	34	8	16+8	6	7+0	2	3+0	0
11	FW	(Iran) IRN	Morteza Tabrizi	40	10	20+7	7	7+1	1	3+2	2
12	GK	(Iran) IRN	Mohammad Rashid Mazaheri	39	0	27+0	0	8+0	0	4+0	0
13	MF	(Iran) IRN	Mohammad Reza Hosseini	22	1	6+11	0	0+1	0	1+3	1
15	MF	(Iran) IRN	Ehsan Pahlevan	40	7	25+4	4	8+0	3	3+0	0
16	MF	(Iran) IRN	Mehdi Mehdipour	38	3	18+7	2	8+0	0	4+1	1
17	FW	(Brazil) BRA	Marco Aurélio Iubel	8	0	0+6	0	0+2	0	0+0	0
18	DF	(Lebanon) LBN	Ali Hamam	34	1	23+0	1	6+0	0	5+0	0
19	DF	(Iran) IRN	Mehrdad Ghanbari	11	1	5+3	1	0+1	0	2+0	0
20	DF	(Iran) IRN	Hojjat Haghverdi	14	0	10+2	0	0+0	0	2+0	0
21	DF	(Iran) IRN	Saeb Mohebi	4	0	1+2	0	0+0	0	0+1	0
23	MF	(Iran) IRN	Danial Esmaeilifar	36	2	18+7	1	2+5	1	4+0	0
24	MF	(Iran) IRN	Reza Shekari	13	1	0+11	0	0+1	0	0+1	1
25	MF	(Iran) IRN	Mohammadreza Abbasi	15	0	3+6	0	2+3	0	0+1	0
26	DF	(Iran) IRN	Nima Taheri	0	0	0+0	0	0+0	0	0+0	0
28	FW	(Iran) IRN	Ali Khodadadi	0	0	0+0	0	0+0	0	0+0	0
30	FW	(Iran) IRN	Mehdi Rajabzadeh	41	8	26+4	5	6+0	2	5+0	1
32	MF	(Iran) IRN	Mehran Derakhshan Mehr	0	0	0+0	0	0+0	0	0+0	0
33	DF	(Iran) IRN	Vahid Mohammadzadeh	13	1	5+1	0	6+0	1	1+0	0
35	MF	(Iran) IRN	Kamran Momeni	0	0	0+0	0	0+0	0	0+0	0
36	MF	(Iran) IRN	Kianoush Eghbali	0	0	0+0	0	0+0	0	0+0	0
40	GK	(Iran) IRN	Peyman Salmani	0	0	0+0	0	0+0	0	0+0	0
61	DF	(Iran) IRN	Hashem Beikzadeh	11	1	7+0	0	4+0	1	0+0	0
77	MF	(Iran) IRN	Ahmad Amir Kamdar	13	1	5+2	1	0+6	0	0+0	0

=== Top scorers ===
Includes all competitive matches. The list is sorted by shirt number when total goals are equal.

Last updated on 30 May 2016

Ranking	Position	Nation	Name	Pro League	Champions League	Hazfi Cup	Total
1	MF	(Iran)	Morteza Tabrizi	7	1	2	10
2	FW	(Iran)	Kaveh Rezaei	6	2	0	8
2	FW	(Iran)	Mehdi Rajabzadeh	5	2	1	8
3	FW	(Iran)	Masoud Hassanzadeh	6	1	0	7
3	MF	(Iran)	Ehsan Pahlavan	4	3	0	7
4	MF	(Iran)	Mehdi Mehdipour	2	0	1	3
5	MF	(Iran)	Danial Esmaeilifar	1	1	0	2

Friendlies and pre-season goals are not recognized as competitive match goals.

=== Most assists ===
Includes all competitive matches. The list is sorted by shirt number when total assists are equal.

Last updated on 5 January 2016

Ranking	Position	Nation	Name	Pro League	Champions League	Hazfi Cup	Total
1	FW	(Iran)	Mehdi Rajabzadeh	6	0	0	6
1	DF	(Lebanon)	Ali Hamam	4	1	1	6
2	FW	(Iran)	Kaveh Rezaei	3	0	1	4
2	MF	(Iran)	Ghasem Haddadifar	3	2	0	4
3	MF	(Iran)	Morteza Tabrizi	1	2	0	3
4	MF	(Iran)	Danial Esmaeilifar	2	0	0	2

Friendlies and pre-season goals are not recognized as competitive match assists.

=== Disciplinary record ===
Includes all competitive matches. Players with 1 card or more included only.

Last updated on 30 May 2016

				2015–16 Iran Pro League			AFC Champions League			Hazfi Cup			Total		
Position	Nation	Number	Name	Booked	(yellow card) (yellow-red card)	Sent off (straight red)	Booked	(yellow card) (yellow-red card)	Sent off (straight red)	Booked	(yellow card) (yellow-red card)	Sent off (straight red)	Booked	(yellow card) (yellow-red card)	Sent off (straight red)
1	(Iran)	4	Hadi Mohammadi	6	0	0	2	0	0	0	0	0	8	0	0
2	(Iran)	8	Ghasem Haddadifar	4	0	0	1	0	0	1	0	0	6	0	0
3	(Iran)	12	Mohammad Rashid Mazaheri	4	0	0	0	0	0	1	0	0	5	0	0
3	(Lebanon)	18	Ali Hamam	3	0	0	0	0	0	2	0	0	5	0	0
4	(Iran)	11	Morteza Tabrizi	3	0	0	0	0	0	1	0	0	4	0	0
4	(Lebanon)	3	Walid Ismail	2	0	0	0	0	0	2	0	0	4	0	0
5	(Iran)	13	Mohammad Reza Hosseini	2	0	0	0	0	0	1	0	0	3	0	0
5	(Iran)	7	Masoud Hassanzadeh	2	0	0	0	0	0	1	0	0	3	0	0
5	(Iran)	16	Mehdi Mehdipour	3	0	0	0	0	0	0	0	0	3	0	0
5	(Iran)	61	Hashem Beikzadeh	3	0	0	0	0	0	0	0	0	3	0	0
6	(Iran)	23	Danial Esmaeilifar	2	0	0	0	0	0	0	0	0	2	0	0
6	(Iran)	9	Kaveh Rezaei	2	0	0	0	0	0	0	0	0	2	0	0
6	(Iran)	5	Akbar Sadeghi	2	0	0	0	0	0	0	0	0	2	0	0
6	(Iran)	77	Ahmad Amir Kamdar	2	0	0	0	0	0	0	0	0	2	0	0
6	(Iran)	15	Ehsan Pahlavan	2	0	0	0	0	0	0	0	0	2	0	0
7	(Iran)	20	Hojjat Haghverdi	1	0	0	0	0	0	0	0	0	1	0	0
7	(Iran)	2	Mohammad Nejad Mehdi	1	0	0	0	0	0	0	0	0	1	0	0
7	(Brazil)	17	Marco Aurélio Iubel	1	0	0	0	0	0	0	0	0	1	0	0
7	(Iran)	33	Vahid Mohammadzadeh	1	1	0	0	0	0	0	0	0	1	1	0
7	(Iran)	25	Mohammadreza Abbasi	1	1	0	0	0	0	0	0	0	1	1	0

=== Goals conceded ===
- Updated on 30 May 2016

Position	Nation	Number	Name	Pro League	Champions League	Hazfi Cup	Total	Clean Sheets
GK	(Iran)	1	Mohammad Bagher Sadeghi	3	0	1	4	0
GK	(Iran)	12	Mohammad Rashid Mazaheri	27	8	4	39	20
TOTALS				30	8	5	43	20

=== Own goals ===
- Updated on 5 January 2016

Position	Nation	Number	Name	Pro League	Champions League	Hazfi Cup	Total
TOTALS				0	0	0	0

== Club ==
=== Coaching staff ===
Position	Name
Head coach	(Iran) Yahya Golmohammadi
Assistant coach	(Iran) Mojtaba Hosseini
Assistant coach	(Iran) Hassan Esteki
Goalkeeping coach	(Iran) Davoud Fanaei
Fitness coach	(Iran) Behzad Noshadi
Physiotherapist	(Iran) Abbas Moradi
Performance analyst	(Iran) Reza Nasr Esfahani
Analyzer	(Iran) Mohammad Askari
Doctor	(Iran) Dr. Amir Hossein Sharifianpour
Logistics	(Iran) Mahmoud Mehruyan
Team director	(Iran) Ali Shojaei

=== Other information ===
Chairman	(Iran) Saeed Azari
Ground (capacity and dimensions)	Foolad Shahr Stadium (20,000 / )

Updated to match played 4 January 2016

== See also ==
- 2015–16 Persian Gulf Pro League
- 2015–16 Hazfi Cup
- 2016 AFC Champions League
