= Mohammad-Ali Asghari =

Iranian football administrator

Mohammad Asghari
- Born: Mohammad Ali Asghari; March 3, 1954 (age 72); Isfahan, Iran
- Occupation: Football administrator
- Title: Chairman of Zob Ahan FC (2011–2013)

Mohammad Ali Asghari (Persian: محمدعلی عسگری, born 3 March 1954) is an Iranian football administrator, who was the chairman of the Zob Ahan FC from 23 August 2011 to 13 September 2013. He was vice chairman of the club from 2009 to 2011.

== See also ==
- Zob Ahan F.C.

Business positions
Preceded by Asghar Dalili	Zob Ahan chairman 2011–2013	Succeeded by Saeed Azari
