= Mohammad Nejadmehdi =

Iranian footballer

Mohammad Nejad Mehdi
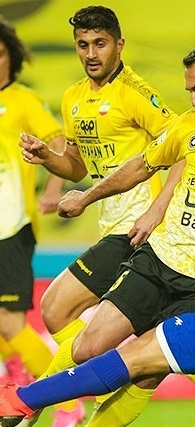
- Nejad Mehdi with Sepahan in 2021

Personal information
- Full name: Mohammad Nejad Mehdi
- Date of birth: October 20, 1992 (age 34)
- Place of birth: Babol, Iran
- Height: 1.85 m (6 ft 1 in)
- Position: Centre back

Team information
- Current team: Shams Azar
- Number: 2

Youth career
- 2009–2012: Perspolis Qaem Shahr

Senior career*
Years	Team	Apps	(Gls)
2012–2014	Nassaji	33	(4)
2014–2015	Padideh	20	(0)
2015–2020	Zob Ahan	119	(5)
2020–2023	Sepahan	42	(2)
2023	Foolad	9	(1)
2023–2025	Mes Rafsanjan	39	(0)
2025–	Shams Azar	32	(0)
- * Club domestic league appearances and goals as of 18 August 2026

Mohammad Nejad Mehdi (Persian: محمد نژادمهدی) is an Iranian football centre-back who currently plays for Iranian football club Shams Azar in the Persian Gulf Pro League.

== Club career ==
=== Nassaji ===
Nejad Mehdi started his career with Nassaji from youth levels. As Summer 2012 he promoted to first team. He spent 2 seasons with Nassaji and scored 4 times in 33 matches.

=== Padideh ===
He joined Padideh in summer 2014 with two-years contract. He made his debut for Padideh against Naft Masjed Soleyman as a starter in 2014–15 Iran Pro League. He played as a right back at Padideh while he was usually used as a center back by Nassaji.

=== Zob Ahan ===
On 27 June 2015 he joined Zob Ahan with a three seasons contract which keep him until end of 2017–18 season with Isfahani side.

== Club career statistics ==
As of 24 May 2021.

Club	Division	Season	League		Hazfi Cup		Asia		Total	
Club	Division	Season	Apps	Goals	Apps	Goals	Apps	Goals	Apps	Goals
Nassaji	Division 1	2012–13	13	1	0	0	–	–	13	1
Nassaji	Division 1	2013–14	21	3	0	0	–	–	21	3
Padideh	Pro League	2014–15	20	0	0	0	–	–	20	0
Zob Ahan	Pro League	2015–16	20	1	2	1	4	0	26	1
Zob Ahan	Pro League	2016–17	29	0	4	0	6	0	39	0
Zob Ahan	Pro League	2017–18	29	1	1	1	7	0	37	2
Zob Ahan	Pro League	2018–19	17	1	1	0	8	2	26	3
Zob Ahan	Pro League	2019–20	23	1	0	0	–	–	23	1
Sepahan	Pro League	2020–21	21	1	2	0	3	0	26	1
Sepahan	Pro League	2021–22	0	0	0	0	0	0	0	0
Career totals			193	9	10	2	28	2	231	13

== Honours ==
Zob Ahan

- Hazfi Cup (1): 2015–16
- Iranian Super Cup (1): 2016
