= Hamid Bou Hamdan =

Iranian footballer

Hamid BouHamdan
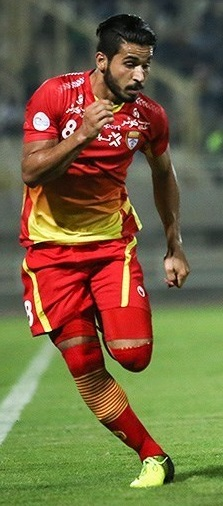
- Hamid BouHamdan

Personal information
- Full name: Hamid BouHamdan
- Date of birth: March 13, 1989 (age 37)
- Place of birth: Dezful, Iran
- Height: 1.81 m (5 ft 11 in)
- Position: Defensive midfielder

Team information
- Current team: Esteghlal Khuzestan
- Number: 8

Youth career
- Naft Masjed Soleyman

Senior career*
Years	Team	Apps	(Gls)
2012–2013	Naft Masjed Soleyman	14	(2)
2013–2016	Naft Tehran	36	(2)
2014–2015	→ Naft Masjed Soleyman (loan)	27	(3)
2016–2017	Foolad	29	(0)
2017–2020	Zob Ahan	85	(2)
2020–2021	Tractor	24	(1)
2021–2023	Foolad	52	(4)
2023–2024	Gol Gohar	14	(0)
2024–2025	Foolad	20	(1)
2025–	Esteghlal Khuzestan	33	(2)
- * Club domestic league appearances and goals

Hamid BouHamdan (born 13 March 1989) is an Iranian footballer who plays for Esteghlal Khuzestan.

== Club career ==
=== Naft Tehran ===
Hamid moved to Naft Tehran in 2013 and played for the club in Iran Pro League. Hamid started his debut in a 0–1 victory over Fajr Sepasi in a league match.

=== Naft Masjed Soleyman ===
Hamid came back to Naft Masjed Soleyman for one year on a loan deal on 5 January 2014. He is used as a starting 11 after his great performance.

== Career statistics ==
Appearances and goals by club, season and competition
Club	Season	League			Hazfi Cup		Asia		Other		Total	
Club	Season	Division	Apps	Goals	Apps	Goals	Apps	Goals	Apps	Goals	Apps	Goals
Naft Masjed Soleyman	2012–13	Division 1	25	3	0	0	–	–	0	0	25	3
Naft Tehran	2013–14	Pro League	11	0	0	0	–	–	0	0	11	0
Naft Masjed Soleyman (loan)	2014–15	PGPL	27	3	0	0	–	–	0	0	27	3
Naft Tehran	2015–16	PGPL	25	2	3	0	1	0	0	0	29	2
Foolad	2016–17	PGPL	29	0	3	0	–	–	0	0	32	0
Zob Ahan	2017–18	Persian Gulf Pro League	29	0	1	0	9	0	0	0	39	0
Zob Ahan	2018–19	Persian Gulf Pro League	27	1	1	0	8	1	0	0	36	2
Zob Ahan	2019–20	Persian Gulf Pro League	30	0	1	0	0	0	0	0	31	0
Zob Ahan	Total		86	1	3	0	17	1	0	0	106	2
Tractor	2020–21	PGPL	24	1	1	0	6	0	1	0	32	1
Foolad	2021–22	Persian Gulf Pro League	24	3	2	0	7	0	1	0	34	3
Foolad	2022–23	Persian Gulf Pro League	28	1	2	0	0	0	0	0	30	1
Foolad	Total		52	4	4	0	7	0	1	0	64	4
Gol Gohar	2023–24	PGPL	14	0	0	0	0	0	0	0	14	0
Foolad	2023–24	PGPL	12	1	0	0	0	0	0	0	12	1
Career total			295	15	14	0	31	1	2	0	342	16

== Honours ==
Naft Masjed Soleyman

- Azadegan League (1): 2013–14

Foolad

- Iranian Super Cup: 2021
