= Mehran Derakhshan Mehr =

Iranian footballer

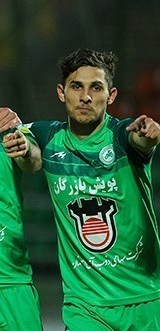

Personal information
- Date of birth: 10 August 1998 (age 28)
- Place of birth: Isfahan, Iran
- Height: 1.75 m (5 ft 9 in)
- Positions: Left midfielder; left back

Team information
- Current team: Nirooye Zamini
- Number: 24

Youth career
- 2006–2016: Zob Ahan

Senior career*
Years	Team	Apps	(Gls)
2015–2020	Zob Ahan	53	(3)
2020–2022	Foolad	21	(0)
2022–2023	Gol Gohar	4	(0)
2023	Zob Ahan	6	(0)
2024–	Nirooye Zamini	8	(1)

International career^{‡}
2011–2014	Iran U17	14	(1)
2016–2017	Iran U20	3	(0)
2017	Iran U23	1	(0)
- * Club domestic league appearances and goals as of 29 April 2025 ‡ National team caps and goals as of 19 July 2017

Mehran Derakhshan Mehr (Persian: مهران درخشان مهر; born 10 August 1998) is an Iranian footballer who plays for Nirooye Zamini in the Azadegan League.

== Club career ==
=== Zob Ahan ===
He joined Zob Ahan in the winter break of 2014–15 Season

=== Club career statistics ===
As of 15 May 2019

Club performance			League		Cup		Continental		Total	
Club	League	Season	Apps	Goals	Apps	Goals	Apps	Goals	Apps	Goals
Iran			League		Hazfi Cup		Asia		Total	
Zob Ahan	Pro League	2014–15	0	0	0	0	–	–	0	0
Zob Ahan	Pro League	2015–16	0	0	0	0	0	0	0	0
Zob Ahan	Pro League	2016–17	18	0	3	0	6	0	27	0
Zob Ahan	Pro League	2017–18	9	1	1	0	0	0	10	1
Zob Ahan	Pro League	2018–19	13	2	1	0	4	0	18	2
Career Total			40	3	5	0	10	0	65	3

== International career ==
=== U20 ===
He is part of Iran U–20 during 2012 AFC U-19 Championship qualification, 2012 CIS Cup, 2012 AFF U-19 Youth Championship and 2012 AFC U-19 Championship.

== Honours ==
=== Club ===
Zob Ahan

- Hazfi Cup (2): 2014–15, 2015–16
- Iranian Super Cup (1): 2016

Foolad

- Hazfi Cup (1): 2020–21
- Iranian Super Cup: 2021
