= Mohammad Reza Hosseini =

Iranian footballer (born 1989)

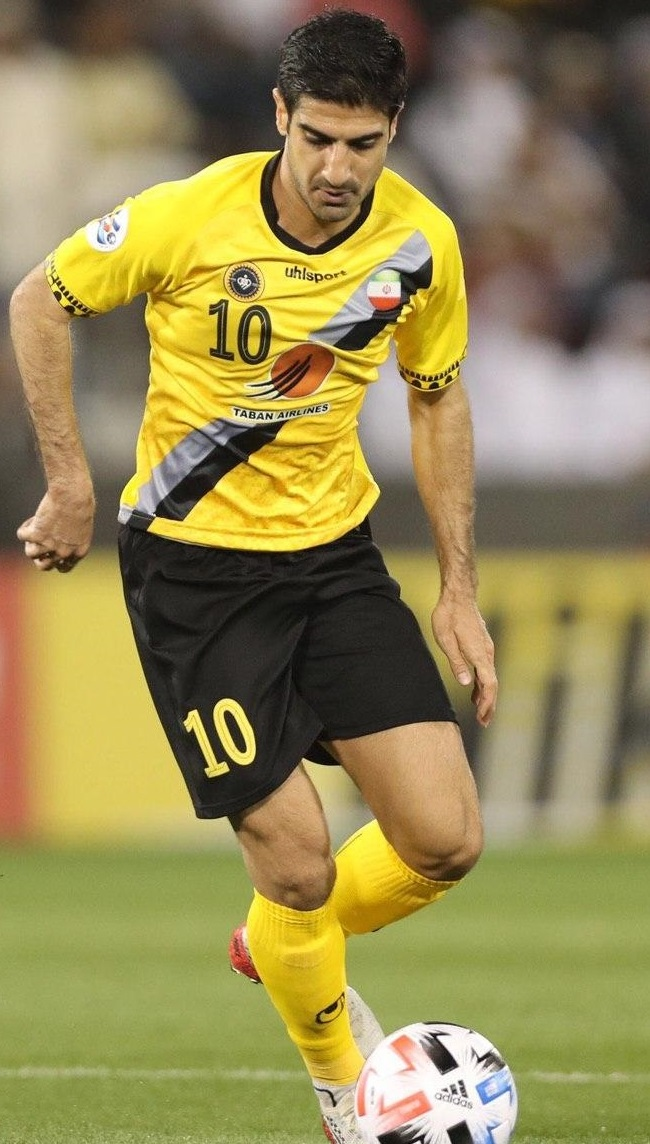

Personal information
- Full name: Seyed Mohammad Reza Hosseini
- Date of birth: 15 September 1989 (age 37)
- Place of birth: Nurabad, Fars, Fars province, Iran
- Height: 1.83 m (6 ft 0 in)
- Position: Right winger

Team information
- Current team: Nassaji
- Number: 76

Senior career*
Years	Team	Apps	(Gls)
2012–2015	Fajr Sepasi	51	(8)
2015–2019	Zob Ahan	98	(12)
2019–2023	Sepahan	89	(11)
2023	→ Gol Gohar (loan)	14	(2)
2024–	Nassaji	29	(0)
- * Club domestic league appearances and goals as of 17 April 2025

Seyed Mohammad Reza Hosseini (Persian: سید محمد رضا حسینی; born 15 September 1989) is an Iranian footballer who plays for Nassaji in the Persian Gulf Pro League

== Club career ==
=== Fajr Sepasi ===
He started his career Shahrdari Noorabad Mamasani F.C.. In January 2012, after scoring in friendly match between Shahrdari Noorabad Mamasani F.C. & Fajr Sepasi, Mahmoud Yavari, the boss of Fajr Sepasi, approved him. After few days he joined Fajr Sepasi.

=== Zob Ahan ===
On 5 July 2015 he joined Zob Ahan with a three seasons contract which keep him until end of 2017–18 season with Isfahani side. Hosseini was named as the best player from Zob Ahan in the Navad site with a score of 2.77 in the 2017–18 season.

== Club career statistics ==
As of 28 November 2020.

Club	Season	League			Hazfi Cup		Asia		Other		Total	
Club	Season	Division	Apps	Goals	Apps	Goals	Apps	Goals	Apps	Goals	Apps	Goals
Fajr Sepasi	2011–12	Pro League	15	0	0	0	–	–	–	–	15	0
Fajr Sepasi	2012–13	Pro League	18	3	0	0	–	–	–	–	18	3
Fajr Sepasi	2013–14	Pro League	2	0	0	0	–	–	–	–	2	0
Fajr Sepasi	2014–15	Azadegan League	18	4	0	0	–	–	–	–	18	4
Total			53	7	0	0	—		—		53	7
Zob Ahan	2015–16	Pro League	17	0	4	1	1	0	–	–	22	1
Zob Ahan	2016–17	Pro League	28	4	5	0	6	0	1	–	40	4
Zob Ahan	2017–18	Pro League	26	6	1	0	9	1	–	–	36	7
Zob Ahan	2018–19	Pro League	27	2	1	0	7	0	–	–	35	2
Total			98	12	11	1	23	1	1	0	133	14
Sepahan	2019–20	Pro League	24	3	2	0	2	0	–	–	28	3
Sepahan	2020–21	Pro League	28	6	0	0	4	0	–	–	32	6
Sepahan	2021–22	Pro League	0	0	0	0	0	0	0	0	0	0
Total			52	9	2	0	6	0	–	–	42	9
Career total			203	28	13	1	29	1	1	0	246	30

== Honours ==
Zob Ahan

- Hazfi Cup (1): 2015–16
- Iranian Super Cup (1): 2016
