= Mohammad Bagher Sadeghi =

Iranian footballer

Mohammad-Bagher Sadeghi
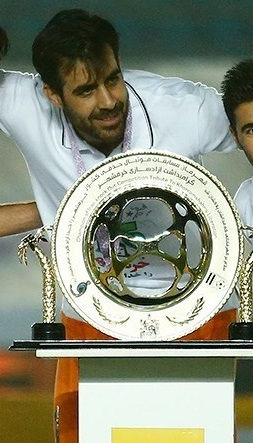

Personal information
- Full name: Mohammad-Bagher Sadeghi
- Date of birth: 1 April 1989 (age 37)
- Place of birth: Isfahan, Iran
- Height: 1.90 m (6 ft 3 in)
- Position: Goalkeeper

Team information
- Current team: Machine Sazi
- Number: 23

Youth career
- 2005–2010: Zob Ahan

Senior career*
Years	Team	Apps	(Gls)
2007–2012	Zob Ahan	30	(0)
2012–2013	Sepahan	11	(0)
2013–2014	Saipa	28	(0)
2014–2016	Zob Ahan	14	(0)
2016–2017	Saba Qom	3	(0)
2017–2020	Zob Ahan	5	(0)
2020–2021	Machine Sazi	3	(0)

International career^{‡}
2007–2008	Iran U20	5	(0)
- * Club domestic league appearances and goals as of 18 May 2015 ‡ National team caps and goals as of 28 December 2008

Mohammadbagher Sadeghi (Persian: محمدباقر صادقی, born 1 April 1989) is an Iranian football goalkeeper.

== Club career ==
He was a product of Zob Ahan youth system. He joined the first team in 2007–08 season. After spending five season with Zob Ahan and making only nine appearances in his last season, he transferred to Sepahan under a three-year contract in July 2012. His contract was terminated in summer 2013 and he joined Saipa.

=== Club career statistics ===
As of 18 May 2019

Club performance			League		Cup		Continental		Total	
Season	Club	League	Apps	Goals	Apps	Goals	Apps	Goals	Apps	Goals
Iran			League		Hazfi Cup		Asia		Total	
2007–08	Zob Ahan	Pro League	14	0	2	0	–	–	16	0
2008–09	Zob Ahan	Pro League	1	0	2	0	–	–	3	0
2009–10	Zob Ahan	Pro League	0	0	0	0	0	0	0	0
2010–11	Zob Ahan	Pro League	1	0	0	0	1	0	2	0
2011–12	Zob Ahan	Pro League	14	0	0	0	0	0	14	0
2012–13	Sepahan	Pro League	11	0	2	0	2	0	15	0
2013–14	Saipa	Pro League	26	0	0	0	–	–	26	0
2014–15	Zob Ahan	Pro League	11	0	0	0	–	–	11	0
2015–16	Zob Ahan	Pro League	3	0	1	0	0	0	4	0
2016–17	Saba Qom	Pro League	3	0	1	0	0	0	4	0
2017–18	Zob Ahan	Pro League	0	0	0	0	0	0	0	0
2018–19	Zob Ahan	Pro League	4	0	0	0	1	0	5	0
2019–20	Zob Ahan	Pro League	1	0	0	0	0	0	1	0
Career total			90	0	8	0	4	0	102	0

== International career ==
He was a part of Iran national under-20 football team participating in AFC U-19 Championship 2008.

== Honours ==
Zob Ahan

- AFC Champions League: 2010 (Runner-up)
- Iran Pro League: 2008–09 (Runner-up), 2009–10 (Runner-up)
- Hazfi Cup (3): 2008–09, 2014–15, 2015–16

Sepahan

- Hazfi Cup (1): 2012–13
