= Hamid Maleki =

Iranian footballer

Personal information
- Date of birth: 6 October 1996 (age 30)
- Place of birth: Ardabil, Iran
- Height: 1.75 m (5 ft 9 in)
- Position: Left-back

Team information
- Current team: Mes Shahr-e Babak
- Number: 2

Youth career
- –2016: Rah Ahan

Senior career*
Years	Team	Apps	(Gls)
2016–2017	New Bargh		
2017–2018	Sepidrood	13	(0)
2018–2021	Zob Ahan	26	(0)
2021–2022	Mes Shahr-e Babak	18	(0)
2022–2024	Fajr Sepasi	30	(1)
2024–2025	Kheybar	6	(0)
2025–	Mes Shahr-e Babak	2	(0)
- * Club domestic league appearances and goals as of 16 April 2025

Hamid Maleki (Persian: حمید ملکی, born 6 October 1996) is an Iranian footballer who plays as a left-back for Mes Shahr-e Babak in the Azadegan League.
