= Mohammadreza Baouj =

Iranian Football Forward

Personal information
- Full name: Mohammadreza Baouj Rezaei
- Date of birth: 1 August 1996 (age 30)
- Place of birth: Tonekabon, Iran
- Height: 1.83 m (6 ft 0 in)
- Position: Striker

Youth career
- –2016: Zob Ahan

Senior career*
Years	Team	Apps	(Gls)
2016–2017	Saba Qom	21	(1)
2017–2020	Saipa		
- * Club domestic league appearances and goals

Mohammadreza Baouj Rezaei (Persian: محمدرضا بائوج رضایی; born 1 August 1996) is an Iranian former football striker.
