= Vahid Mohammadzadeh =

Iranian footballer

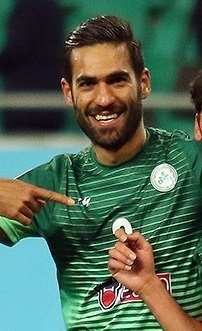

Personal information
- Date of birth: 16 May 1989 (age 37)
- Place of birth: Karaj, Iran
- Height: 1.94 m (6 ft 4 in)
- Position: Centre-back

Team information
- Current team: Nassaji
- Number: 3

Youth career
- Mes Rafsanjan

Senior career*
Years	Team	Apps	(Gls)
2012–2014	Mes Rafsanjan	48	(1)
2014–2016	Saipa	28	(2)
2016–2021	Zob Ahan	123	(9)
2021–2023	Aluminium Arak	58	(2)
2023–	Nassaji	36	(2)
- * Club domestic league appearances and goals as of 11 April 2025

Vahid Mohammadzadeh (Persian: وحيد محمد زاده; born 16 May 1989) is an Iranian professional footballer who plays for Nassaji in the Persian Gulf Pro League.

== Club career ==
=== Mes Rafsanjan ===
Mohammadzadeh started his career with Mes Rafsanjan in the Azadegan League. He was one of the most successful players in the team, and managed to score one goal as a defender.

=== Saipa ===
In the summer of 2014 Vahid signed a three-year contract to Iran Pro League side Saipa. He made his debut match against Esteghlal on 19 August 2014. In a game against Gostaresh Foolad on 29 January, Vahid was named player of the match after scoring two goals as a defender. The game finished 3–2 on Saipa's side.

=== Zob Ahan ===
In the winter of 2016 Mohammadzadeh signed a two-and-a-half-year contract to Iran Pro League side Zob Ahan. On 5 April 2016 Vahid scored the second goal from a corner in a 5–2 victory over Bunyodkor in the AFC Champions League.

== Club career statistics ==
As of 1 June 2018.

Club	Division	Season	League		Hazfi Cup		Asia		Total	
Club	Division	Season	Apps	Goals	Apps	Goals	Apps	Goals	Apps	Goals
Mes Rafsanjan	Division 1	2012–13	25	0	0	0	–	–	25	0
Mes Rafsanjan	Division 1	2013–14	23	1	0	0	–	–	23	1
Mes Rafsanjan	Total		48	1	0	0	0	0	48	1
Saipa	Pro League	2014–15	24	2	2	0	–	–	26	2
Saipa	Pro League	2015–16	4	0	1	0	–	–	5	0
Saipa	Total		28	2	3	0	0	0	31	2
Zob Ahan	Persian Gulf Pro League	2015-16	6	0	1	0	6	1	13	1
Zob Ahan	Persian Gulf Pro League	2016–17	27	0	4	0	4	1	35	1
Zob Ahan	Persian Gulf Pro League	2017–18	27	1	0	0	8	0	35	1
Zob Ahan	Persian Gulf Pro League	2018–19	19	1	0	0	6	1	25	2
Zob Ahan	Persian Gulf Pro League	2019–20	19	1	2	1	0	0	21	2
Zob Ahan	Persian Gulf Pro League	2020–21	26	5	2	0	0	0	28	5
Zob Ahan	Total		124	8	9	1	24	3	157	12
Aluminium	Persian Gulf Pro League	2021-22	29	0	5	0	0	0	34	0
Aluminium	Persian Gulf Pro League	2022-23	29	2	1	0	0	0	30	2
Aluminium	Total		58	2	6	0	0	0	64	2
Nassaji	Persian Gulf Pro League	2023-24	16	2	0	0	5	0	21	2
Career Totals			274	15	18	1	29	3	321	19

== Honours ==
Zob Ahan

- Hazfi Cup: 2015–16
- Iranian Super Cup: 2016
