= Marion (footballer) =

Brazilian footballer

Personal information
- Full name: Marion Silva Fernandes
- Date of birth: 7 September 1991 (age 35)
- Place of birth: Teixeira de Freitas, Brazil
- Height: 1.72 m (5 ft 7 1/2 in)
- Position: Forward

Team information
- Current team: Aquidauanense

Youth career
- Atlético Mineiro

Senior career*
Years	Team	Apps	(Gls)
2010–2016	Atlético Mineiro	21	(1)
2010–2011	→ Democrata (loan)	0	(0)
2012	→ Vila Nova (loan)	10	(1)
2013	→ Betim (loan)	16	(6)
2015	→ Sharjah (loan)	11	(1)
2015	→ Joinville (loan)	16	(0)
2016	→ Estoril (loan)	11	(2)
2016	→ Santa Cruz (loan)	9	(0)
2017	América-MG	1	(0)
2017–2018	CRB	7	(0)
2018	Oeste	5	(0)
2018–2019	Zob Ahan	21	(2)
2019–2020	Al-Arabi	5	(1)
2020–2021	Boa Esporte	4	(0)
2021	Amazonas		
2021	Boavista	2	(0)
2021	União Luziense		
2022	Amazonas	7	(0)
2023	Jacobinense	6	(0)
2023–	Aquidauanense	1	(0)
- * Club domestic league appearances and goals as of 2 April 2023

Marion Silva Fernandes, simply known as Marion (born 7 September 1991), is a Brazilian professional footballer who plays for Aquidauanense.

== Career ==
Born in Teixeira de Freitas, Bahia, Marion graduated from Atlético Mineiro's youth system, and made his senior debut while on loan at Democrata FC. In January 2012 he was loaned to Vila Nova, in Série C. A year later he joined Betim, also in a temporary deal, with whom he appeared 16 times and netted six goals.

On 29 January 2014 Marion made his Galo debut, coming on as a substitute in a 0–0 draw at Minas Futebol. He scored his first goal on 9 March, netting the winner in a success at Guarani (MG).

Marion made his Série A debut on 20 April, again from the bench in a 0–0 home draw against Corinthians. He scored his first goal in the category on 11 May, netting his team's first in a 2–1 home win against fierce rivals Cruzeiro, and finished the campaign with 21 appearances.

On 12 February 2015 Marion was loaned to Sharjah, until June. At the end of his loan spell with the Emirati club, he immediately moved to Joinville EC, again in a temporary deal.

== Honours ==
Atlético Mineiro

- Recopa Sudamericana: 2014
- Copa do Brasil: 2014
