= Meraj Esmaeili =

Iranian association football player

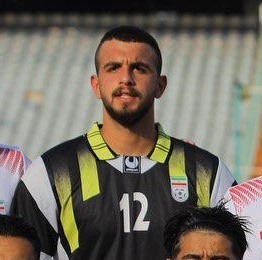

Personal information
- Date of birth: 13 January 2000 (age 26)
- Place of birth: Andimeshk, Iran
- Height: 1.93 m (6 ft 4 in)
- Position: Goalkeeper

Youth career
- –2017: Foolad
- 2017: Moghavemat

Senior career*
Years	Team	Apps	(Gls)
2017–2020	Zob Ahan	10	(0)
2020–2021	Paykan	0	(0)
2023–2024	Foolad B	8	(0)

International career^{‡}
2016	Iran U17	2	(0)
2018–2019	Iran U23	12	(0)
- * Club domestic league appearances and goals as of 13 May 2024 ‡ National team caps and goals as of 28 December 2019

Meraj Esmaeili (Persian: معراج اسماعیلی, born 13 January 2000) is an Iranian footballer who plays as a goalkeeper.

== Club career ==
=== Zob Ahan ===
He made his debut for Zob Ahan in 29th fixtures of 2018–19 Iran Pro League against Foolad while he substituted in for Mohammad Bagher Sadeghi.

== Honours ==
=== International ===
Iran U16

- AFC U-16 Championship runner-up: 2016
