= Alireza Cheraghali =

Iranian footballer

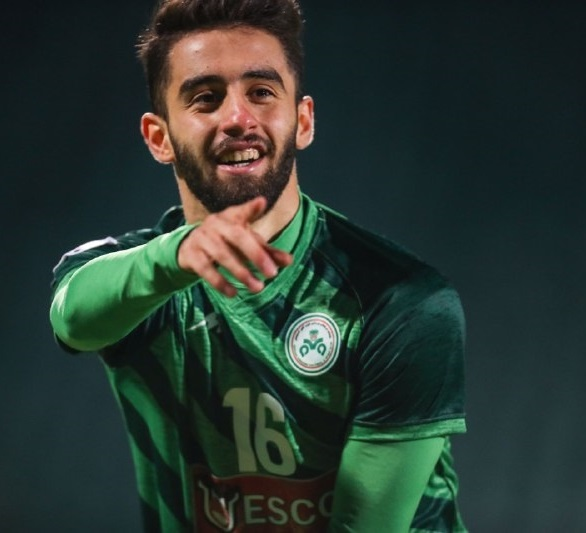

Personal information
- Date of birth: 6 January 1997 (age 29)
- Place of birth: Shemiran, Iran
- Height: 1.72 m (5 ft 7 1/2 in)
- Position: Midfielder

Team information
- Current team: PAS Hamedan
- Number: 28

Youth career
- 2015–2016: Naft Novin

Senior career*
Years	Team	Apps	(Gls)
2016–2018	Gostaresh	10	(0)
2018–2019	Machine Sazi	0	(0)
2019–2020	Zob Ahan	7	(0)
2021	Aluminium Arak	5	(0)
2021–2022	Havadar	1	(0)
2022	Vista Turbine		
2022–2024	Nirooye Zamini	14	(1)
2025–	PAS Hamedan	9	(1)
- * Club domestic league appearances and goals as of 13 April 2025

Alireza Cheraghali (Persian: علیرضا چراغعلی, born 6 January 1997) is an Iranian footballer who plays as a midfielder for PAS Hamedan in the League 2.

== Club career ==
=== Gostaresh Foulad ===
He made his debut for Gostaresh Foulad (currently name: Machine Sazi) in first fixtures of 2017–18 Iran Pro League against Pars Jonoubi Jam while he substituted in for Ahmad Zendehrouh.

=== Club career statistics ===
As of 1 May 2018

Club performance			League		Cup		Continental		Total	
Club	League	Season	Apps	Goals	Apps	Goals	Apps	Goals	Apps	Goals
Iran			League		Hazfi Cup		Asia		Total	
Mashin Sazi	Pro League	2017–18	10	0	0	0	-	-	10	0
Mashin Sazi	Pro League	2018–19	0	0	0	0	-	-	0	0
Zob Ahan	Pro League	2018–19	9	1	0	0	6	1	15	2
Career Total			19	1	0	0	6	1	25	2
