= Milad Fakhreddini =

Iranian footballer

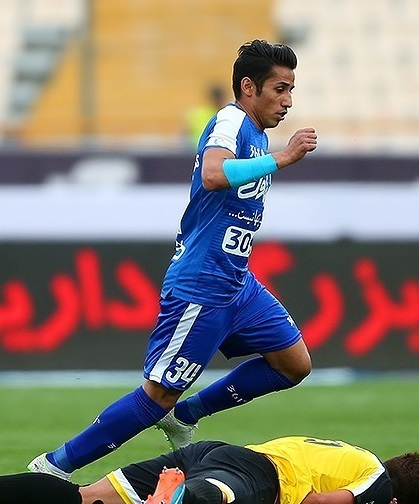
- Milad playing for Esteghlal in 2016

Personal information
- Full name: Seyyed Milad Sheikh Fakhreddini
- Date of birth: 26 May 1990 (age 36)
- Place of birth: Kerman, Iran
- Height: 1.68 m (5 ft 6 in)
- Positions: Right back; winger

Team information
- Current team: Sanat Naft Abadan
- Number: 34

Youth career
- 2006–2009: Mes Kerman

Senior career*
| Years | Team | Apps | (Gls) |
| 2009–2012 | Mes Kerman | 53 | (3) |
| 2012–2014 | Tractor | 54 | (1) |
| 2014–2016 | Esteghlal | 48 | (2) |
| 2016–2017 | Naft Tehran | 23 | (1) |
| 2017–2018 | Gostaresh Foulad | 8 | (2) |
| 2018–2020 | Zob Ahan | 47 | (5) |
| 2020–2021 | Tractor | 35 | (2) |
| 2021–2024 | Aluminium Arak | 67 | (4) |
| 2024 | Esteghlal | 8 | (0) |
| 2024–2025 | Shams Azar | 15 | (1) |
| 2025 | Gol Gohar | 14 | (0) |
| 2025–2026 | Mes Rafsanjan | 21 | (0) |
| 2026– | Sanat Naft | 11 | (0) |

International career^{‡}
| 2010–2011 | Iran U23 | 3 | (1) |
| 2012–2015 | Iran | 2 | (0) |
- * Club domestic league appearances and goals as of 2 May 2025 ‡ National team caps and goals as of 15 December 2012

Seyyed Milad Sheikh Fakhreddini, known as Milad Fakhreddini (Persian: میلاد ‌فخرالدینی; born 26 May 1990) is an Iranian professional footballer who plays as a right back for Sanat Naft Abadan in the Persian Gulf Pro League.

== Club career ==
Fakhreddini started his senior career with Mes Kerman in 2010 and he spent three years at the club making forty-four appearances before moving to Tractor. He helped Tractor achieve a runners-up finish in the Iran Pro League. In June 2014, Fakhreddini signed with Esteghlal.

== Club statistics ==
As of 1 June 2024

| Club performance | | | League | | Cup | | Continental | | other | | Total | |
| Season | Club | League | Apps | Goals | Apps | Goals | Apps | Goals | Apps | Goals | Apps | Goals |
| Iran | | | League | | Hazfi Cup | | Asia | | Other | | Total | |
|---|---|---|---|---|---|---|---|---|---|---|---|---|
| 2009–10 | Mes | Iran Pro League | 9 | 1 | 3 | 1 | 0 | 0 | 0 | 0 | 12 | 2 |
| 2010–11 | Mes | Iran Pro League | 28 | 2 | 0 | 0 | - | - | 0 | 0 | 28 | 2 |
| 2011–12 | Mes | Iran Pro League | 17 | 0 | 2 | 0 | - | - | 0 | 0 | 19 | 0 |
| Total | | | 54 | 3 | 5 | 1 | 0 | 0 | 0 | 0 | 59 | 4 |
| 2011-12 | Tractor | Persian Gulf Pro League | 14 | 0 | 1 | 0 | - | - | 0 | 0 | 15 | 0 |
| 2012–13 | Tractor | Persian Gulf Pro League | 20 | 1 | 1 | 0 | 0 | 0 | 0 | 0 | 21 | 1 |
| 2013–14 | Tractor | Persian Gulf Pro League | 19 | 0 | 2 | 0 | 5 | 1 | 0 | 0 | 26 | 1 |
| Total | | | 53 | 1 | 4 | 0 | 5 | 1 | 0 | 0 | 62 | 2 |
| 2014–15 | Esteghlal | Persian Gulf Pro League | 25 | 1 | 3 | 0 | - | - | 0 | 0 | 28 | 1 |
| 2015–16 | Esteghlal | Persian Gulf Pro League | 23 | 1 | 4 | 1 | - | - | 0 | 0 | 27 | 2 |
| Total | | | 48 | 2 | 7 | 1 | 0 | 0 | 0 | 0 | 55 | 3 |
| 2016–17 | Naft Tehranl | Persian Gulf Pro League | 23 | 1 | 4 | 1 | - | - | 0 | 0 | 27 | 2 |
| 2017–18 | Gostaresh Foolad | Persian Gulf Pro League | 8 | 2 | 1 | 0 | - | - | 0 | 0 | 9 | 2 |
| 2017–18 | Zob Ahan | Persian Gulf Pro League | 14 | 4 | 0 | 0 | 9 | 0 | 0 | 0 | 23 | 4 |
| 2018–19 | Zob Ahan | Persian Gulf Pro League | 24 | 0 | 1 | 0 | 7 | 0 | 0 | 0 | 32 | 0 |
| 2019–20 | Zob Ahan | Persian Gulf Pro League | 14 | 1 | 1 | 0 | 2 | 0 | 0 | 0 | 17 | 1 |
| Total | | | 52 | 5 | 2 | 0 | 18 | 0 | 0 | 0 | 72 | 5 |
| 2019–20 | Tractor | Persian Gulf Pro League | 9 | 0 | 3 | 0 | - | - | 0 | 0 | 12 | 0 |
| 2020–21 | Tractor | Persian Gulf Pro League | 26 | 2 | 1 | 0 | 6 | 0 | 1 | 0 | 34 | 2 |
| Total | | | 35 | 2 | 4 | 0 | 6 | 0 | 1 | 0 | 46 | 2 |
| 2021–22 | Aluminium | Persian Gulf Pro League | 27 | 1 | 5 | 1 | 0 | 0 | 0 | 0 | 32 | 2 |
| 2022–23 | Aluminium | Persian Gulf Pro League | 27 | 1 | 2 | 0 | 0 | 0 | 0 | 0 | 29 | 1 |
| 2023–24 | Aluminium | Persian Gulf Pro League | 13 | 2 | 0 | 0 | 0 | 0 | 0 | 0 | 13 | 2 |
| Total | | | 67 | 4 | 7 | 1 | 0 | 0 | 0 | 0 | 74 | 5 |
| 2023–24 | Esteghlal | Persian Gulf Pro League | 8 | 0 | 1 | 0 | 0 | 0 | 0 | 0 | 9 | 0 |
| Career total | | | 348 | 20 | 35 | 4 | 29 | 1 | 1 | 0 | 413 | 25 |

- Assist Goals

| Season | Team | Assists |
|---|---|---|
| 2010–11 | Mes | 0 |
| 2011–12 | Mes | 1 |
| 2011–12 | Tractor | 2 |
| 2012–13 | Tractor | 1 |
| 2013–14 | Tractor | 3 |
| 2014–15 | Esteghlal | 1 |

== International career ==
He made his debut against Mauritania in April 2012 under Carlos Queiroz.

== Honours ==
Tractor

- Hazfi Cup (2): 2013–14, 2019–20

Naft Tehran

- Hazfi Cup (1): 2016–17
