= Kiros (footballer) =

Brazilian footballer

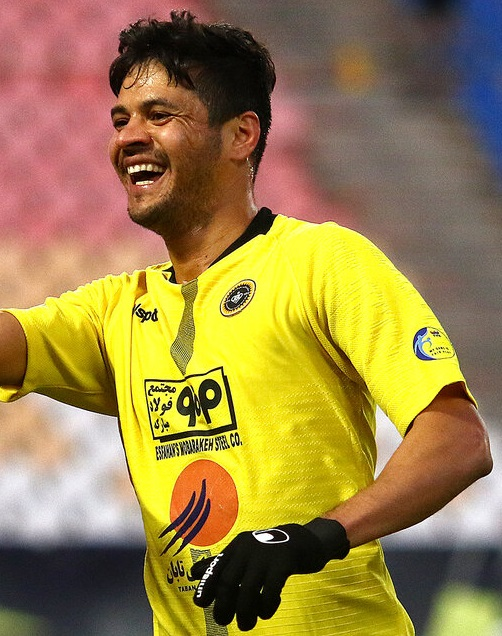

Personal information
- Full name: Kiros Stanlley Soares Ferraz
- Date of birth: 21 August 1988 (age 38)
- Place of birth: Caruaru, Brazil
- Height: 1.96 m (6 ft 5 in)
- Position: Forward

Team information
- Current team: Petrolina
- Number: 99

Senior career*
Years	Team	Apps	(Gls)
2011–2016	Porto de Caruaru	0	(0)
2011	→ Santa Cruz (loan)	9	(2)
2012	→ Paysandu (loan)	17	(8)
2013	→ Bragantino (loan)	0	(0)
2013	→ Red Bull Brasil (loan)	0	(0)
2013	→ Icasa (loan)	3	(0)
2014	→ Santa Rita (loan)	0	(0)
2014	→ Salgueiro (loan)	10	(2)
2015	→ Remo (loan)	4	(2)
2016	→ Novo Hamburgo (loan)	0	(0)
2016	Kyoto Sanga	11	(1)
2017	Resende	0	(0)
2017	América-RN	2	(0)
2017–2018	Zob Ahan	21	(9)
2018–2021	Sepahan	66	(34)
2022–2023	Gol Gohar	15	(5)
2024–	Petrolina	2	(0)
- * Club domestic league appearances and goals as of 10 August 2024

Kiros Stanlley Soares Ferraz (born 21 August 1988), known as just Kiros, is a Brazilian professional footballer. He plays as a forward for Petrolina in the Campeonato Brasileiro Série D.

== Career ==
Kiros played the majority of his career in the Brazilian State Leagues with occasional appearances in the second, third, and fourth divisions. He joined J2 League club Kyoto Sanga FC in 2016. In August 2017, Kiros signed a contract with Persian Gulf Pro League side Zob Ahan. He signed a three-year contract with Sepahan in summer 2018 and became league top scorer at the first season.

== Career statistics ==
As of 23 April 2023

Appearances and goals by club, season and competition
Club	Season	League			State League		Cup		Continental		Other		Total	
Club	Season	Division	Apps	Goals	Apps	Goals	Apps	Goals	Apps	Goals	Apps	Goals	Apps	Goals
Porto de Caruaru	2011	Série D	—		17	3	—		—		—		17	3
Porto de Caruaru	2012	Pernambucano	—		18	9	—		—		—		18	9
Porto de Caruaru	2014	Série D	—		22	9	—		—		—		22	9
Porto de Caruaru	2015	Pernambucano	—		19	19	—		—		—		19	19
Porto de Caruaru	Total		—		76	40	—		—		—		76	40
Santa Cruz (loan)	2011	Série D	9	2	—		—		—		—		9	2
Paysandu (loan)	2012	Série C	17	8	—		—		—		—		17	8
Bragantino (loan)	2013	Paulista	—		0	0	—		—		—		0	0
Red Bull Brasil (loan)	2013	Paulista A2	—		8	2	—		—		—		8	2
Icasa (loan)	2013	Série B	3	0	—		—		—		—		3	0
Santa Rita (loan)	2014	Alagoano	—		5	2	3	1	—		—		8	3
Salgueiro (loan)	2014	Série C	10	2	—		—		—		—		10	2
Remo (loan)	2015	Série D	4	2	—		—		—		—		4	2
Novo Hamburgo (loan)	2016	Série D	—		13	3	—		—		—		13	3
Kyoto Sanga	2016	J2 League	11	1	—		—		—		—		11	1
Resende	2017	Carioca	—		7	3	—		—		—		7	3
América-RN	2017	Série D	2	0	—		—		—		—		2	0
Zob Ahan	2017–18	Persian Gulf Pro League	21	9	—		0	0	9	1	—		30	10
Sepahan	2018–19	Persian Gulf Pro League	26	16	—		4	1	—		—		30	17
Sepahan	2019–20	Persian Gulf Pro League	25	7	—		2	0	5	1	—		32	8
Sepahan	2020–21	Persian Gulf Pro League	17	1	—		2	0	—		—		19	1
Sepahan	Total		68	24	—		8	1	5	1	—		81	26
Gol Gohar	2021–22	Persian Gulf Pro League	12	5	—		1	0	—		—		13	5
Gol Gohar	2022–23	Persian Gulf Pro League	24	2	—		3	0	—		—		27	2
Gol Gohar	Total		36	7	—		4	0	—		—		40	7
Career total			181	55	109	50	15	2	14	1	0	0	319	108

== Honours ==
Individual

- Persian Gulf Pro League Top Scorer: 2018–19
