= Mohammad Sattari =

Iranian footballer

Personal information
- Full name: Seyed Mohammad Sattari Iqbali
- Date of birth: 30 October 1993 (age 33)
- Place of birth: Tehran, Iran
- Height: 1.80 m (5 ft 11 in)
- Positions: Left back; defensive midfielder

Team information
- Current team: Havadar
- Number: 44

Youth career
- 2005–2007: Persepolis
- 2007–2014: Rah Ahan

Senior career*
Years	Team	Apps	(Gls)
2014–2015	Rah Ahan	21	(0)
2015–2016	Khoneh Be Khoneh	9	(0)
2016	Malavan	10	(0)
2016–2018	Zob Ahan	29	(0)
2018–2019	Pars Jonoubi	21	(0)
2019–2021	Paykan	51	(1)
2021–2022	Havadar	27	(1)
2022–2023	Mes Kerman	25	(0)
2023–2024	Kheybar Khorramabad	9	(0)
2024	Paykan	14	(0)
2024–	Havadar	19	(0)
- * Club domestic league appearances and goals as of 1 May 2025

Seyed Mohammad Sattari Iqbali (Persian: سیدمحمد ستاری اقبالی; born 30 October 1993) is an Iranian football left back who plays for Havadar in the Persian Gulf Pro League.

== Club career ==
=== Rah Ahan ===
He was part of Rah Ahan Academy from 2007 to 2014. He promoted to first team in summer 2014 with a 5-years contract by Hamid Estili and made his debut for them in 2nd fixture of 2014–15 Iran Pro League against Naft Tehran.

== Career statistics ==
As of match played 1 June 2024

Appearances and goals by club, season and competition
Club	Season	League			Hazfi Cup		Asia		Total	
Club	Season	Division	Apps	Goals	Apps	Goals	Apps	Goals	Apps	Goals
Rah Ahan	2014–15	Persian Gulf Pro League	21	0	2	0	—		23	0
Khoneh Be Khoneh	2015–16	Azadegan League	9	0	0	0	—		9	0
Malavan	2015–16	Persian Gulf Pro League	10	0	0	0	—		10	0
Zob Ahan	2016–17	Persian Gulf Pro League	9	0	3	0	0	0	12	0
Zob Ahan	2017–18	Persian Gulf Pro League	20	0	1	0	4	0	25	0
Zob Ahan	Total		29	0	4	0	4	0	37	0
Pars Jonoubi	2018–19	Persian Gulf Pro League	21	0	2	0	—		23	0
Paykan	2019–20	Persian Gulf Pro League	29	0	1	0	—		30	0
Paykan	2020–21	Persian Gulf Pro League	22	1	1	0	—		23	1
Paykan	Total		51	1	2	0	—		53	1
Havadar	2021–22	Persian Gulf Pro League	27	1	0	0	—		27	1
Mes Kerman	2022–23	Persian Gulf Pro League	25	0	1	0	—		26	0
Kheybar Khorramabad	2023–24	Azadegan League	9	0	—		—		9	0
Paykan	2023–24	Persian Gulf Pro League	14	0	1	0	—		15	0
Career Total			216	0	14	0	4	0	234	0
