= Ali Khodadadi (footballer) =

Iranian footballer

Personal information
- Date of birth: 18 February 1998 (age 28)
- Place of birth: Isfahan, Iran
- Height: 1.85 m (6 ft 1 in)
- Position: Forward

Team information
- Current team: Sepahan
- Number: 20

Youth career
- –2018: Zob Ahan

Senior career*
Years	Team	Apps	(Gls)
2016–2022	Zob Ahan	21	(0)
2019–2021	→ Nirooye Zamini (loan)	20	(10)
2022–2023	Chadormalou	41	(11)
2023–2024	Pars Jonoubi Jam	12	(4)
2024–2026	Chadormalou	58	(9)
2026–	Sepahan	10	(0)

International career^{‡}
2014	Iran U17	1	(0)
- * Club domestic league appearances and goals as of 17 April 2025 ‡ National team caps and goals as of 11 September 2014

Ali Khodadadi (Persian: علی خدادادی, born 18 February 1998) is an Iranian footballer who plays as a centre forward for Sepahan in the Persian Gulf Pro League.

== Club career ==
=== Zob Ahan ===
He made his debut for Zob Ahan in 4th fixtures of 2018–19 Iran Pro League against Sepahan while he substituted in for Eddie Hernández.
