= Fuladshahr Stadium =

Football stadium in Fooladshahr, Iran

- Zob Ahan Stadium
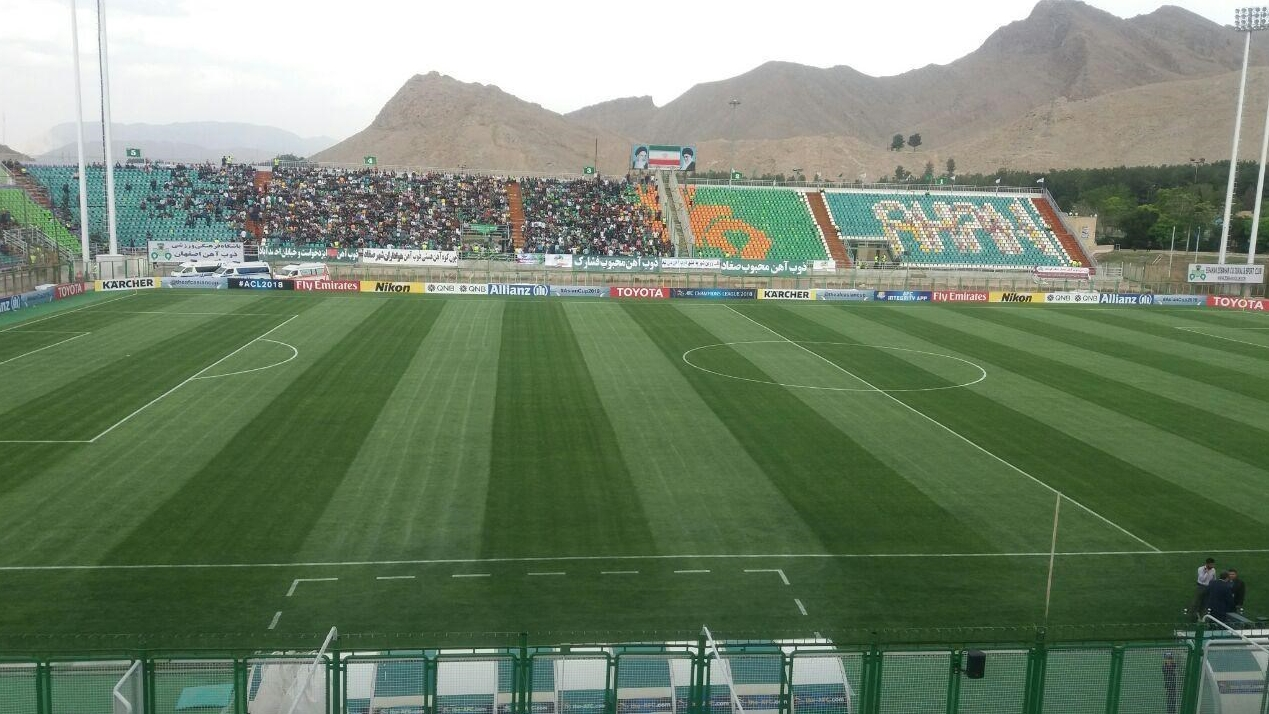
- Fuladshahr Stadium in 2018
- Interactive map of Fuladshahr Stadium
- Full name: Fuladshahr Stadium
- Location: Fuladshahr, Iran
- Coordinates: 32°28′58″N 51°25′17″E
- Capacity: 20,000
- Surface: Grass
- Field size: 105 m × 68 m (115 yd × 74 yd)

Construction
- Built: 1998

Tenants
- Zob Ahan (1998–present); Sepahan (2007–2016); Iran national football team (selected matches)

Fuladshahr Stadium (Note: Also romanized as Foolad Shahr Stadium) (Persian: ورزشگاه فولادشهر, Varzeshgāh-e Fulādshahr) is a football stadium in Fuladshahr, Iran. It is the home stadium of Zob Ahan, and was opened in 1998. The stadium is listed as having a capacity of 20,000.

It has hosted 2007 AFC Champions League Final between Sepahan and Urawa Red Diamonds.

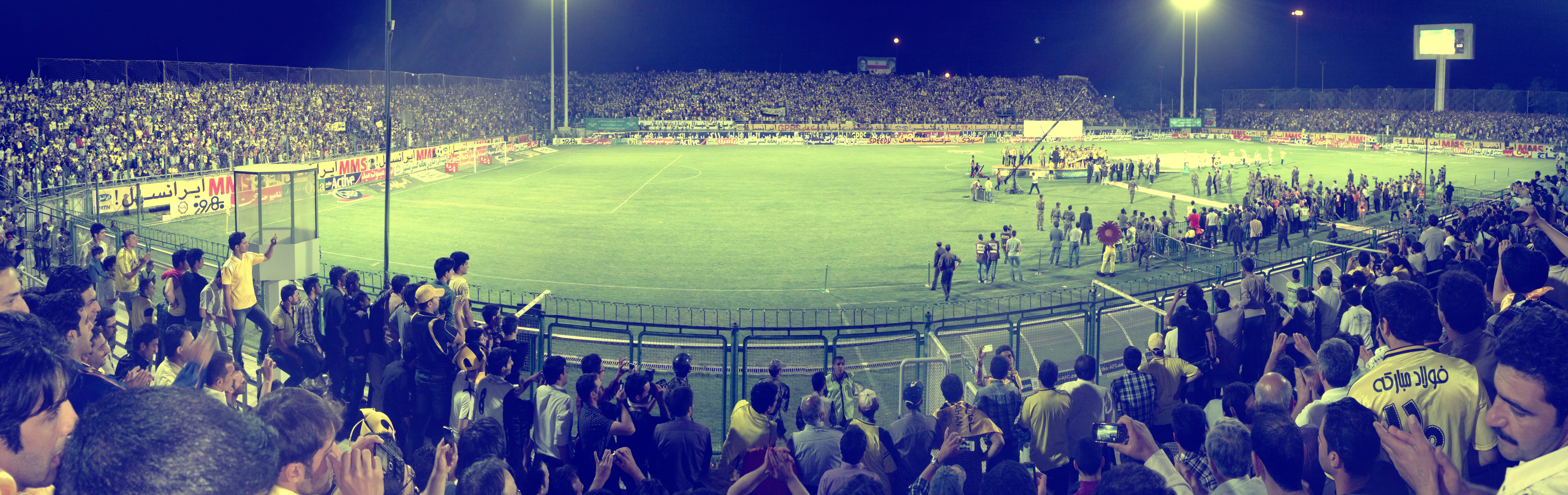
Fuladshahr Stadium in 2012

== International Matches ==
Iran National Football Team

Date	Team #1	Res.	Team #2	Competition	Attendance
5 September 2024	Iran	1–0	Kyrgyzstan	2026 FIFA World Cup qualification	12,077
