= Saeid Azari =

Iranian sport administrator

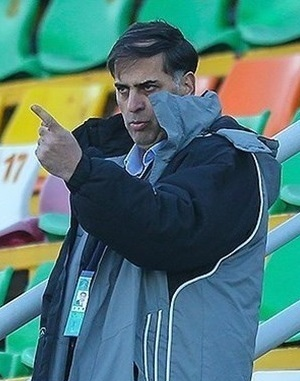
- Born: Saeid Mahmoudizad Azari; March 21, 1968 (age 58); Tabriz, Iran
- Education: B.Sc., M.Sc., PhD Physical Education
- Alma mater: University of Isfahan; Islamic Azad University of Isfahan
- Years active: 1980–1994 (weightlifter); 1991–2003 (coach); 2004–present (administrator)
- Employer: Isfahan Steel Company

Saeid Azari (Persian: سعید آذری, born March 21, 1968) is an Iranian retired weightlifter, coach and sport administrator. He is the current chairman of the Foolad FC.

== Personal life ==
On 14 January 2026, Azari publicly supported the 2025–2026 Iranian protests, saying in response to the high death toll of the protests: "The genocidal Mongols and Timurids and the rest of the dictators of history paled in comparison to those who massacred the children of Iran", and that "The brains who gave the order should be sure that a severe punishment is coming from the Almighty.
