= 2016–17 Zob Ahan F.C. season =

Zob Ahan Isfahan FC
2016–17 season
- Chairman: Saeid Azari
- Manager: Mojtaba Hosseini
- Stadium: Foolad Shahr Stadium, Fooladshahr
- IPL: 4th
- Hazfi Cup: Semi-final
- AFC Champions League: 2017: Group stage
- Iranian Super Cup: Champions
- Top goalscorer: League: Morteza Tabrizi (10 goals); All: Morteza Tabrizi (14 goals)
- Highest home attendance: 12.000 v Persepolis (16 December 2017)
- Lowest home attendance: 100 v Saba Qom (2 February 2017)
Home colours	Away colours

The 2016–17 season was Zob Ahan Football Club's 16th season in the Iran Pro League, and their 21st consecutive season in the top division of Iranian football. They also competed in the Hazfi Cup and AFC Champions League, and had their 46nd year in existence as a football club.

== Players ==
=== First-team squad ===
As of 15 May 2017.

Out for Injuries	Released – Retired

No.	Name	Nationality	Position (s)	Since	Date of birth (age)	Signed from	Ends	Games	Goals
Goalkeepers
12	Mohammad Rashid Mazaheri	(Iran)	GK	2014	May 18, 1989 (aged 27)	(Iran) Foolad	2018	103	0
22	Hamid Erfani	(Iran)	GK	2016	March 21, 1988 (aged 29)	(Iran) Giti Pasand	2016	2	0
40	Peyman Salmani	(Iran)	GK	2012	April 18, 1994 (aged 23)	(Youth system)	2016	1	0
Defenders
2	Mohammad Nejad Mehdi	(Iran)	DF	2015	October 20, 1992 (aged 24)	(Iran) Padideh	2018	65	1
3	Vahid Mohammadzadeh	(Iran)	DF	2016	May 16, 1989 (aged 27)	(Iran) Saipa	2018	48	2
33	Mohammad Sattari	(Iran)	RB	2016	September 30, 1993 (aged 23)	(Iran) Malavan	2018	12	0
18	Ali Hamam	(Lebanon)	RB	2014	August 25, 1986 (aged 30)	(Lebanon) Nejmeh	2018	101	3
19	Mehrdad Ghanbari	(Iran)	RB	2014	November 22, 1989 (aged 27)	(Iran) Padideh	2017	61	3
20	Hojjat Haghverdi	(Iran)	DF	2014	February 3, 1993 (aged 24)	(Iran) Aboumoslem	2017	34	0
24	Mehran Derakhshan Mehr	(Iran)	DF	2015	August 10, 1998 (aged 18)	(Youth system)	2018	27	1
26	Nima Taheri	(Iran)	DF	2016	November 5, 1996 (aged 20)	(Youth system)	2018	0	0
36	Kianoush Eghbali	(Iran)	DF	2015	April 6, 1996 (aged 21)	(Youth system)	2018	0	0
Midfielders
6	Mehdi Mehdipour	(Iran)	MF	2014	February 18, 1994 (aged 23)	(Youth system) (Iran) Rah Ahan	2019	95	2
7	Mohammad Reza Hosseini	(Iran)	RM	2015	September 15, 1989 (aged 27)	(Iran) Fajr Sepasi	2018	61	5
8	Ghasem Hadadifar	(Iran)	MF	2003	July 12, 1983 (aged 33)	(Youth system)	2016	323	18
9	Rabih Ataya	(Lebanon)	RM, Left winger	2017	July 16, 1989 (aged 28)	(Lebanon) Al-Ansar	2018	13	0
10	Ehsan Pahlavan	(Iran)	LM	2013	July 25, 1993 (aged 23)	(Iran) Gostaresh Foulad	2019	116	13
11	Morteza Tabrizi	(Iran)	RM, ST	2013	January 6, 1991 (aged 26)	(Iran) Pas Hamedan	2017	138	34
14	Reza Shekari	(Iran)	AM	2015	May 31, 1998 (aged 18)	(Iran) Moghavemat Tehran	2018	21	2
17	Mohammadreza Abbasi	(Iran)	LM	2014	July 27, 1996 (aged 20)	(Youth system)	2018	41	3
23	Danial Esmaeilifar	(Iran)	RM, RB	2014	February 26, 1993 (aged 24)	(Iran) Payam Sanat	2018	89	6
35	Kamran Momeni	(Iran)	MF	2015	December 1, 1995 (aged 21)	(Youth system)	2018	0	0
Forwards
27	Jerry Bengtson	(Honduras)	ST	2016	April 8, 1987 (aged 30)	(Iran) Persepolis	2017	37	12
30	Mehdi Rajabzadeh	(Iran)	SS	2012	June 21, 1978 (age 47)	(Iran) Fajr Sepasi	2017	328	103
70	Yaser Feyzi	(Iran)	ST	2016	April 5, 1992 (aged 25)	(Iran) Oxin Alborz	2017	25	2

=== Iran Pro League squad ===
As of 19 January 2016 Note: Flags indicate national team as defined under FIFA eligibility rules; some limited exceptions apply. Players may hold more than one non-FIFA nationality.

No.	Pos.	Nation	Player
2	DF	IRN	Mohammad Nejad Mehdi
3	DF	IRN	Vahid Mohammadzadeh
6	MF	IRN	Mehdi Mehdipour
7	FW	IRN	Mohammad Reza Hosseini
8	MF	IRN	Ghasem Hadadifar (Captain)
9	FW	LBN	Rabih Ataya
10	MF	IRN	Ehsan Pahlevan
11	FW	IRN	Morteza Tabrizi
12	GK	IRN	Mohammad Rashid Mazaheri
14	MF	IRN	Reza Shekari ^{U21}
17	FW	IRN	Mohammadreza Abbasi ^{U21}
18	DF	LBN	Ali Hamam

No.	Pos.	Nation	Player
19	DF	IRN	Mehrdad Ghanbari
20	DF	IRN	Hojjat Haghverdi
22	GK	IRN	Hamid Erfani
23	MF	IRN	Danial Esmaeilifar
24	MF	IRN	Mehran Derakhshan Mehr ^{U21}
26	DF	IRN	Nima Taheri ^{U21}
27	FW	HON	Jerry Bengtson
30	FW	IRN	Mehdi Rajabzadeh (Vice captain)
35	MF	IRN	Kamran Momeni ^{U23}
36	DF	IRN	Kianoush Eghbali ^{U23}
40	GK	IRN	Peyman Salmani ^{U23}
70	FW	IRN	Yaser Feyzi

== Transfers ==
Confirmed transfers 2016–17

=== Summer ===
In: Note: Flags indicate national team as defined under FIFA eligibility rules; some limited exceptions apply. Players may hold more than one non-FIFA nationality.

No.	Pos.	Nation	Player
—	FW	IRN	Yaser Feyzi (from Oxin Alborz)
—	GK	IRN	Hamid Erfani (from Giti Pasand)
—	MF	IRN	Mohammad Sattari^{PL} (from Malavan)
—	FW	HON	Jerry Bengtson^{PL} (from Persepolis)

Out: Note: Flags indicate national team as defined under FIFA eligibility rules; some limited exceptions apply. Players may hold more than one non-FIFA nationality.

No.	Pos.	Nation	Player
1	GK	IRN	Mohammad Bagher Sadeghi (to Saba Qom)
3	DF	LBN	Walid Ismail (End of Contract)
4	DF	IRN	Hadi Mohammadi (to Tractor Sazi)
7	FW	IRN	Masoud Hassanzadeh (to Saipa)
9	FW	IRN	Kaveh Rezaei (to Esteghlal)
17	FW	BRA	Marco Aurélio Iubel (Mutual consent)
21	DF	IRN	Saeb Mohebi (to Rah Ahan)
33	GK	IRN	Mohammad Amin Bahrami (to Tractor Sazi)
61	DF	IRN	Hashem Beikzadeh (to Saba Qom)
77	MF	IRN	Ahmad Amir Kamdar (to Machine Sazi)
—	MF	IRN	Sina Ashouri (to Tractor Sazi, previously on loan)

=== Winter ===
In: Note: Flags indicate national team as defined under FIFA eligibility rules; some limited exceptions apply. Players may hold more than one non-FIFA nationality.

No.	Pos.	Nation	Player
—	FW	LBN	Rabih Ataya (from (Lebanon) Al Ansar)

Out: Note: Flags indicate national team as defined under FIFA eligibility rules; some limited exceptions apply. Players may hold more than one non-FIFA nationality.

No.	Pos.	Nation	Player

== Competitions ==
=== Overview ===
Competition	Started round	Current position / round	Final position / round	First match	Last match
Persian Gulf Pro League	—	—	4th	29 July 2016	13 May 2017
AFC Champions League	Group stage	—	Group stage	23 February 2016	25 May 2017
Hazfi Cup	Round of 32	—	Semi Final	11 September 2016	29 May 2017

Updated to match played 15 May 2016
Source: Competitions

=== Iran Pro League ===
==== Standings ====
Pos	Team	Pld	W	D	L	GF	GA	GD	Pts	Qualification or relegation
2	Esteghlal	30	16	9	5	45	27	+18	57	Qualification for the 2018 AFC Champions League group stage
3	Tractor Sazi	30	15	11	4	38	24	+14	56	Qualification for the 2018 AFC Champions League group stage
4	Zob Ahan	30	12	10	8	39	30	+9	46	Qualification for the 2018 AFC Champions League qualifying play-offs
5	Sepahan	30	12	9	9	38	34	+4	45	
6	Paykan	30	12	8	10	39	38	+1	44	

Updated to match(es) played on 4 May 2017. Source: IPL Stats, Soccerway
Rules for classification: 1) Points; 2) Goal difference; 3) Goals scored.

==== Results summary ====
Overall								Home						Away					
Pld	W	D	L	GF	GA	GD	Pts	W	D	L	GF	GA	GD	W	D	L	GF	GA	GD
30	12	10	8	39	30	+9	46	8	4	3	19	10	+9	4	6	5	20	20	0

Last updated: 15 May 2017.
Source: Ipl Stats

==== Results by round ====
Round	1	2	3	4	5	6	7	8	9	10	11	12	13	14	15	16	17	18	19	20	21	22	23	24	25	26	27	28	29	30
Ground	A	H	A	H	A	H	A	H	A	H	A	H	A	H	A	H	A	H	A	H	A	H	A	H	A	H	A	H	A	H
Result	L	D	W	D	D	L	L	W	L	W	W	W	W	W	D	W	D	W	D	L	L	L	L	D	D	D	W	W	D	W
Position	13	12	7	6	8	9	14	10	11	8	5	4	3	3	3	3	3	3	3	4	4	4	4	4	4	4	4	4	5	4

Updated to match(es) played on 15 May 2017. Source: "Ipl".
A = Away; H = Home; W = Win; D = Draw; L = Loss

==== Matches ====
Win Draw Loss

July 29, 2015 1	Malavan	1 – 0	Zob Ahan	Anzali
18:50 UTC+04:30	Afshin 61'; Afshin (yellow card) 61'	Report	Hamam (yellow card) 55'	Stadium: Takhti Stadium; Attendance: 4.656; Referee: Toraj Haghverdi

August 7, 2015 2	Zob Ahan	0 – 1	Sepahan	Isfahan
21:00 UTC+04:30	Nejad Mehdi (yellow card) 60'	Report	Karimi 73'	Stadium: Foolad Shahr Stadium; Attendance: 6.000; Referee: Mohsen Ghahramani

August 14, 2015 3	Esteghlal	0 – 2	Zob Ahan	Tehran
19:20 UTC+04:30	Mkoyan (yellow card) 39'; Karimi (yellow card) 88'	Report	Pahlavan 61'; Tabrizi 85'; Tabrizi (yellow card) 85'; Mazaheri (yellow card) 92'	Stadium: Azadi Stadium; Attendance: 35.000; Referee: Yadollah Jahanbazi

August 20, 2015 4	Perspolis	1 – 2	Zob Ahan	Tehran
19:15 UTC+04:30	Ahmadzadeh (yellow card) 49'; Alishah 64'; Bengar (yellow card) 90+2'; Bengar (red card)	Report	Rezaei 76'; Hassanzadeh (penalty scored)	Stadium: Azadi Stadium; Attendance: 25.000; Referee: Alireza Faghani

August 26, 2015 5	Zob Ahan	0 – 0	Esteghlal Ahvaz	Isfahan
19:10 UTC+04:30		Report	Karimi (yellow card) 16'	Stadium: Foolad Shahr Stadium; Attendance: 1.500; Referee: Mehdi Seyedali

September 15, 2015 6	Foolad	0 – 3	Zob Ahan	Ahvaz
18:45 UTC+04:30	Mesarić (yellow card) 22'; Chago (yellow card) 45'; Sharifat (yellow card) 50'	Report	Mohammadi 28'; Pahlavan 37'; Sadeghi (yellow card) 59'; Noormohammadi 72'	Stadium: Ghadir Stadium; Attendance: 0 Referee: Reza Kermanshahi

September 26, 2015 7	Zob Ahan	0 – 0	Naft Tehran	Isfahan
17:30 UTC+4:30		Report	Koroushi (yellow card) 87'	Stadium: Foolad Shahr Stadium; Attendance: 800; Referee: Moud Bonyadifar

October 16, 2015 8	Saipa	0 – 1	Zob Ahan	Tehran
15:45 UTC+4:30	Moshkelpour (yellow card) 15'; Alinejad (yellow card) 41'; Nekounam (yellow card) 55'	Report	Hassanzadeh 17'; Mohammadi (yellow card) 70'	Stadium: Shahid Dastgerdi Stadium; Attendance: 300; Referee: Saeid Bakhshizadeh

October 21, 2015 9	Zob Ahan	0 – 0	Gostaresh Foulad	Isfahan
16:45 UTC+4:30	Tabrizi (yellow card) 78'	Report	Kiani (yellow card) 33'; Magno Batista (yellow card) 84'	Stadium: Foolad Shahr Stadium; Attendance: 400; Referee: Mohammadreza Faghani

October 27, 2015 10	Tractor Sazi	4 – 4	Zob Ahan	Tabriz
15:30 UTC+4:30	Rafiei 17'; Rahmani 45,75'; Saghebi 55'; Saghebi (yellow card) 55'	Report	Pahlavan 27'; Mohammadi (yellow card) 30'; Hamam 80'; Rezaei 87'; Pahlavan (yellow card) 90+1'; Esmaeilifar 90+4'	Stadium: Yadegar-e Emam Stadium; Attendance: 2,500; Referee: Hossein Zargar

October 31, 2015 11	Zob Ahan	4 – 0	Rah Ahan	Isfahan
15:30 UTC+04:30	Rezaei 24,67'; Tabrizi 68'; Sadeghi 81'; Sadeghi (yellow card) 83'	Report	Abtahi (yellow card) 54'; Mohammadi (yellow card) 61'	Stadium: Foolad Shahr Stadium; Attendance: 520; Referee: Hamid Haj malek

November 20, 2015 12	Saba Qom	0 – 0	Zob Ahan	Qom
15:15 UTC+04:30	Ghazi (yellow card) 88'	Report	Haghverdi (yellow card) 34'; Rezaei (yellow card) 86'	Stadium: Yadegar-e Emam Stadium; Attendance: 2,500; Referee: Bijan Heidari

November 30, 2015 13	Zob Ahan	3 – 1	Padideh	Isfahan
15:15 UTC+04:30	Hassanzadeh 45,62'; Tabrizi 68'; Mehdipour (yellow card) 79'	Report	Yousefi 79'	Stadium: Foolad Shahr Stadium; Attendance: 500; Referee: Rohollah Sharifi

November 22, 2011 14	Siah Jamegan	0 – 1	Zob Ahan	Mashhad
14:30 UTC+04:30	Zamehran (yellow card) 75'; Mehdipour (yellow card) 78'; Hosseini (yellow card) 92'	Report	Hassanzadeh 45'; Mazaheri (yellow card) 72'	Stadium: Samen Stadium; Attendance: 200; Referee: Ali Safaei

December 18, 2015 15	Zob Ahan	0 – 1	Esteghlal Khuzestan	Isfahan
15:15 UTC+04:30	Hassanzadeh (yellow card) 35'	Report	Zobeydi 78'; Tayyebi (yellow card) 43'; Nassari (yellow card) 45'	Stadium: Foolad Shahr Stadium; Attendance: 1,900; Referee: Hamid Hajmalek

December 26, 2015 16	Zob Ahan	1 – 0	Malavan	Isfahan
15:30 UTC+04:30	Tabrizi 56'; Ismail (yellow card) 44'; Esmaeilifar (yellow card) 77'; Rezaei (yellow card) 90+2'	Report	Darvishi (yellow card) 90+1'	Stadium: Foolad Shahr Stadium; Attendance: 350; Referee: Mohammad Reza Akbarian

December 31, 2015 17	Sepahan	1 – 1	Zob Ahan	Isfahan
15:00 UTC+04:30	Khalatbari 41'; Karimi (yellow card) 48'; Musaev (yellow card) 60'; Karami (yellow card) 66'	Report	Pahlavan 14'; Mehdipour (yellow card) 58'; Hassanzadeh (yellow card) 60'; Pahlavan (yellow card) 70'	Stadium: Foolad Shahr Stadium; Attendance: 3,500; Referee: Hossein Zargar

February 2, 2016 18	Zob Ahan	0 – 0	Esteghlal	Isfahan
14:30 UTC+04:30	Beikzadeh (yellow card) 32'	Report	Hajmohammadi (yellow card) 33'; Rahmati (yellow card) 93'	Stadium: Foolad Shahr Stadium; Attendance: 6,500; Referee: Shahin Haji babaei

February 7, 2016 19	Zob Ahan	2 – 2	Perspolis	Isfahan
14:30 UTC+04:30	Beikzadeh (yellow card) 30'; Mazaheri (yellow card) 68'; Hassanzadeh (penalty scored); Tabrizi 90'	Report	Ahmadzadeh (yellow card) 30'; Alishah 35'; Kamyabinia (yellow card) 71'; Alipour 80'; Rezaeian (yellow card) 86'; Taremi (yellow card) 89'	Stadium: Foolad Shahr Stadium; Attendance: 8,000; Referee: Ashkan Khorshidi

February 13, 2016 20	Esteghlal Ahvaz	1 – 1	Zob Ahan	Ahvaz
15:00 UTC+04:30	Pakparvar (yellow card) 53'; Reykani 90+3'	Report	Rezaei 52'; Amir Kamdar (yellow card) 54'	Stadium: Takhti Stadium(Ahvaz); Attendance: 550; Referee: Javad Rahimzadeh

February 18, 2016 21	Zob Ahan	1 – 1	Foolad	Isfahan
16:00 UTC+04:30	Nejad Mehdi (yellow card) 56'; Rajabzadeh (penalty scored); Iubel (yellow card) 78'	Report	Ahle Shakheh 8'; Feshangchi (yellow card) 51'; Iubel (yellow card) 67'	Stadium: Foolad Shahr Stadium; Attendance: 1,000; Referee: Reza Mahdavi

March 6, 2016 22	Naft Tehran	0 – 1	Zob Ahan	Tehran
15:30 UTC+04:30	Amiri (yellow card) 35'; Bouazar (yellow card) 80'	Report	Mohammadi (yellow card) 27'; Amir Kamdar 38'; Mazaheri (yellow card) 62'	Stadium: Takhti Stadium(Tehran); Attendance: 130; Referee: Mehdi Marhanzadeh

March 10, 2016 23	Zob Ahan	1 – 1	Saipa	Isfahan
17:15 UTC+04:30	Rajabzadeh 30'; Haddadifar (yellow card) 68'; Esmaeilifar (yellow card) 86'	Report	Torabi 45'; Sadeghi (yellow card) 74'	Stadium: Foolad Shahr Stadium; Attendance: 200; Referee: Mohammad Hossein Zahedifar

March 31, 2016 24	Gostaresh Foulad	4 – 3	Zob Ahan	Tabriz
15:30 UTC+04:30	Magno Batista (yellow card) 12'; Ebrahimi 21,78,88'; Hosseini 30'; Leonardo Pimenta (yellow card) 80'; Koohnavard (yellow card) 87'	Report	Ehsan Pahlevan 6'; Mehdi Mehdipour (yellow card) 18' (goal) 37,48'; Hadi Mohammadi (yellow card) 65'; Ahmad Amir Kamdar (yellow card) 75'	Stadium: Gostaresh Foulad Stadium; Attendance: 2,000; Referee: Mohammadreza Akbarian

April 10, 2016 25	Zob Ahan	1 – 2	Tractor Sazi	Isfahan
16:30 UTC+04:30	Rajabzadeh 60'; Haddadifar (yellow card) 63'; Hadi Mohammadi (yellow card) 76'; Mohammad Reza Hosseini (yellow card) 89'	Report	Ashouri (yellow card) 24'; Carlos Cardoso (yellow card) 59'; Rahmani 69'; Shafiei 87' (yellow card) 87'; Shahin Saghebi (yellow card) 88'	Stadium: Foolad Shahr Stadium; Attendance: 2,300; Referee: Mooud Bonyadifar

April 14, 2016 26	Rah Ahan	1 – 1	Zob Ahan	Tehran
17:00 UTC+04:30	Mehdi Hanafi (yellow card) 32'; Mohammad Reza Soleimani 82'	Report	Vahid Mohammadzadeh (yellow card) 48'; Kaveh Rezaei 85'	Stadium: Rah Ahan Stadium; Attendance: 250; Referee: Rohollah Sharifi

April 24, 2016 27	Zob Ahan	1 – 1	Saba Qom	Isfahan
18:15 UTC+04:30	Morteza Tabrizi 13'	Report	Farshid Bagheri 54'	Stadium: Foolad Shahr Stadium; Attendance: 1,000; Referee: Mohammadreza Faghani

April 28, 2016 28	Padideh	0 – 1	Zob Ahan	Mashhad
18:00 UTC+04:30		Report	Mehdi Rajabzadeh 74'	Stadium: Samen Stadium; Attendance: 200; Referee: Mohammad Maleki

May 8, 2016 29	Zob Ahan	3 – 1	Siah Jamegan	Isfahan
18:00 UTC+04:30	Ali Hamam 58'; Mehdi Rajabzadeh 72,80'	Report	Hossein Karimi 40'	Stadium: Foolad Shahr Stadium; Attendance: 400; Referee: Yadollah Jahanbazi

May 13, 2016 30	Esteghlal Khuzestan	2 – 0	Zob Ahan	Ahvaz
18:00 UTC+04:30	Rahim Mehdi Zohaivi 55,59'	Report		Stadium: Ghadir Stadium; Attendance: 3500; Referee: Mohsen Torky

=== AFC Champions League ===
==== Group C ====
Pos	Team	Pld	W	D	L	GF	GA	GD	Pts	Qualification
1	(United Arab Emirates) Al-Ain	6	3	3	0	14	7	+7	12	Advance to knockout stage
2	(Saudi Arabia) Al-Ahli	6	3	2	1	10	7	+3	11	Advance to knockout stage
3	(Iran) Zob Ahan	6	2	1	3	6	9	−3	7	
4	(Uzbekistan) Bunyodkor	6	1	0	5	5	12	−7	3	

Source: AFC
Rules for classification: Group stage tiebreakers
21 February 2017
19:15 UTC+4

Al-Ain (United Arab Emirates)	1–1	(Iran) Zob Ahan
Ismail 76'	Report	Bengtson 57'

Hazza Bin Zayed Stadium, Al Ain
Attendance: 8,122
Referee: Ali Sabah (Iraq)

28 February 2017
19:15 UTC+4

Zob Ahan (Iran)	1–2	(Saudi Arabia) Al-Ahli
Rajabzadeh 45+2' (pen.)	Report	Asiri 29'; Al Somah 86'

Sultan Qaboos Sports Complex, Muscat (Oman) (Note: Matches between teams from Iran and Saudi Arabia were played on neutral venues due to deterioration of Iran–Saudi Arabia relations.)
Attendance: 7,000
Referee: Ko Hyung-jin (South Korea)

13 March 2017
18:00 UTC+5

Bunyodkor (Uzbekistan)	0–2	(Iran) Zob Ahan
	Report	Bengtson 55'; Tabrizi 90+4' (pen.)

Bunyodkor Stadium, Tashkent
Attendance: 2,507
Referee: Fahad Al-Marri (Qatar)

11 April 2017
20:00 UTC+4:30

Zob Ahan (Iran)	2–1	(Uzbekistan) Bunyodkor
Mohammadzadeh 5'; Tabrizi 54'	Report	Nurmatov 72'

Foolad Shahr Stadium, Isfahan
Attendance: 3,833
Referee: Muhammad Taqi (Singapore)

24 April 2017
20:30 UTC+4:30

Zob Ahan (Iran)	0–3	(United Arab Emirates) Al-Ain
	Report	Asprilla 25'; O. Abdulrahman 59'; M. Abdulrahman 80'

Foolad Shahr Stadium, Isfahan
Attendance: 6,321
Referee: Hettikamkanamge Perera (Sri Lanka)

8 May 2017
18:40 UTC+3

Al-Ahli (Saudi Arabia)	2–0	(Iran) Zob Ahan
Asiri 63'; Kurdi 84'	Report

Thani bin Jassim Stadium, Al Rayyan (Qatar)
Attendance: 260
Referee: Ryuji Sato (Japan)

=== Hazfi Cup ===
==== Matches ====
Win Draw Loss

===== Round of 32 =====
11 September 2015 1/16	Zob Ahan	2 – 1	Baderan Tehran	Fuladshahr
19:45	Nejad Mehdi 13'; Mehdipour 56'	Summary		Stadium: Foolad Shahr Stadium

===== Last 16 =====
21 September 2015 1/8	Gostaresh Foulad	0 – 1	Zob Ahan	Tabriz
16:00		Summary	Rajabzadeh 66'	Stadium: Gostaresh Foulad Stadium

===== Quarter-final =====
4 November 2015 1/4	Zob Ahan	2 – 0	Persepolis	Isfahan
14:30 (DST+03:30)	M. Tabrizi 107'; R. Shekari 115'	report		Stadium: Foolad Shahr Stadium; Attendance: 15,000; Referee: Yadollah Jahanbazi

==== Semi-final (1/2 Final – Last 4) ====
24 November 2015 1/2	Zob Ahan	2 – 2 (4 – 1 p)	Sepahan	Isfahan
14:30 (DST+03:30)	M. Tabrizi 2'; M.R. Hosseini 110'	report	V. Ghafouri 52', 113'	Stadium: Foolad Shahr Stadium; Attendance: 7,000; Referee: Mohsen Torky

=== Final ===
29 May 2016 79	Zob Ahan	1 – 1 (5 – 4 p)	Esteghlal	Khorramshahr
21:00 (DST+03:30)	Rahmati 20' (o.g.)	report	Ebrahimi 56' (pen.)	Stadium: Khorramshahr Stadium; Attendance: 15,000; Referee: Alireza Faghani

== Statistics ==
=== Appearances ===
No.	Pos	Nat	Player	Total		Pro League		AFC Champions League		Hazfi Cup	
No.	Pos	Nat	Player	Apps	Goals	Apps	Goals	Apps	Goals	Apps	Goals
2	DF	(Iran) IRN	Mohammad Nejad Mehdi	26	1	20+0	0	4+0	0	2+0	1
3	DF	(Iran) IRN	Vahid Mohammadzadeh	13	1	5+1	0	6+0	1	1+0	0
6	MF	(Iran) IRN	Mehdi Mehdipour	38	3	18+7	2	8+0	0	4+1	1
7	MF	(Iran) IRN	Mohammad Reza Hosseini	40	4	21+7	4	6+0	0	6+0	0
8	MF	(Iran) IRN	Ghasem Hadadifar	36	0	23+1	0	8+0	0	3+1	0
9	FW	(Lebanon) LBN	Rabih Ataya	34	8	16+8	6	7+0	2	3+0	0
10	MF	(Iran) IRN	Ehsan Pahlevan	40	7	25+4	4	8+0	3	3+0	0
11	FW	(Iran) IRN	Morteza Tabrizi	40	10	20+7	7	7+1	1	3+2	2
12	GK	(Iran) IRN	Mohammad Rashid Mazaheri	39	0	27+0	0	8+0	0	4+0	0
14	MF	(Iran) IRN	Reza Shekari	13	1	0+11	0	0+1	0	0+1	1
17	MF	(Iran) IRN	Mohammadreza Abbasi	15	0	3+6	0	2+3	0	0+1	0
18	DF	(Lebanon) LBN	Ali Hamam	34	1	23+0	1	6+0	0	5+0	0
19	DF	(Iran) IRN	Mehrdad Ghanbari	11	1	5+3	1	0+1	0	2+0	0
20	DF	(Iran) IRN	Hojjat Haghverdi	14	0	10+2	0	0+0	0	2+0	0
22	GK	(Iran) IRN	Hamid Erfani	4	0	1+2	0	0+0	0	0+1	0
23	MF	(Iran) IRN	Danial Esmaeilifar	36	2	18+7	1	2+5	1	4+0	0
24	MF	(Iran) IRN	Mehran Derakhshan Mehr	0	0	0+0	0	0+0	0	0+0	0
26	DF	(Iran) IRN	Nima Taheri	0	0	0+0	0	0+0	0	0+0	0
27	FW	(Honduras) HON	Jerry Bengtson	0	0	0+0	0	0+0	0	0+0	0
30	FW	(Iran) IRN	Mehdi Rajabzadeh	41	8	26+4	5	6+0	2	5+0	1
35	MF	(Iran) IRN	Kamran Momeni	0	0	0+0	0	0+0	0	0+0	0
36	MF	(Iran) IRN	Kianoush Eghbali	0	0	0+0	0	0+0	0	0+0	0
40	GK	(Iran) IRN	Peyman Salmani	0	0	0+0	0	0+0	0	0+0	0
70	FW	(Iran) IRN	Yaser Feyzi	13	1	5+2	1	0+6	0	0+0	0

=== Top scorers ===
Includes all competitive matches. The list is sorted by shirt number when total goals are equal.

Last updated on 30 May 2016

Ranking	Position	Nation	Name	Pro League	Champions League	Hazfi Cup	Total
1	MF	(Iran)	Morteza Tabrizi	7	1	2	10
2	FW	(Iran)	Kaveh Rezaei	6	2	0	8
2	FW	(Iran)	Mehdi Rajabzadeh	5	2	1	8
3	FW	(Iran)	Masoud Hassanzadeh	6	1	0	7
3	MF	(Iran)	Ehsan Pahlavan	4	3	0	7
4	MF	(Iran)	Mehdi Mehdipour	2	0	1	3
5	MF	(Iran)	Danial Esmaeilifar	1	1	0	2

Friendlies and pre-season goals are not recognized as competitive match goals.

=== Disciplinary record ===
Includes all competitive matches. Players with 1 card or more included only.

Last updated on 30 May 2016

				2015–16 Iran Pro League			AFC Champions League			Hazfi Cup			Total		
Position	Nation	Number	Name	Booked	(yellow card) (yellow-red card)	Sent off (straight red)	Booked	(yellow card) (yellow-red card)	Sent off (straight red)	Booked	(yellow card) (yellow-red card)	Sent off (straight red)	Booked	(yellow card) (yellow-red card)	Sent off (straight red)
1	(Iran)	4	Hadi Mohammadi	6	0	0	2	0	0	0	0	0	8	0	0
2	(Iran)	8	Ghasem Haddadifar	4	0	0	1	0	0	1	0	0	6	0	0
3	(Iran)	12	Mohammad Rashid Mazaheri	4	0	0	0	0	0	1	0	0	5	0	0
3	(Lebanon)	18	Ali Hamam	3	0	0	0	0	0	2	0	0	5	0	0
4	(Iran)	11	Morteza Tabrizi	3	0	0	0	0	0	1	0	0	4	0	0
4	(Lebanon)	3	Walid Ismail	2	0	0	0	0	0	2	0	0	4	0	0
5	(Iran)	13	Mohammad Reza Hosseini	2	0	0	0	0	0	1	0	0	3	0	0
5	(Iran)	7	Masoud Hassanzadeh	2	0	0	0	0	0	1	0	0	3	0	0
5	(Iran)	16	Mehdi Mehdipour	3	0	0	0	0	0	0	0	0	3	0	0
5	(Iran)	61	Hashem Beikzadeh	3	0	0	0	0	0	0	0	0	3	0	0
6	(Iran)	23	Danial Esmaeilifar	2	0	0	0	0	0	0	0	0	2	0	0
6	(Iran)	9	Kaveh Rezaei	2	0	0	0	0	0	0	0	0	2	0	0
6	(Iran)	5	Akbar Sadeghi	2	0	0	0	0	0	0	0	0	2	0	0
6	(Iran)	77	Ahmad Amir Kamdar	2	0	0	0	0	0	0	0	0	2	0	0
6	(Iran)	15	Ehsan Pahlavan	2	0	0	0	0	0	0	0	0	2	0	0
7	(Iran)	20	Hojjat Haghverdi	1	0	0	0	0	0	0	0	0	1	0	0
7	(Iran)	2	Mohammad Nejad Mehdi	1	0	0	0	0	0	0	0	0	1	0	0
7	(Brazil)	17	Marco Aurélio Iubel	1	0	0	0	0	0	0	0	0	1	0	0
7	(Iran)	33	Vahid Mohammadzadeh	1	1	0	0	0	0	0	0	0	1	1	0
7	(Iran)	25	Mohammadreza Abbasi	1	1	0	0	0	0	0	0	0	1	1	0

=== Goals conceded ===
- Updated on 30 May 2016

Position	Nation	Number	Name	Pro League	Champions League	Hazfi Cup	Total	Clean Sheets
GK	(Iran)	1	Mohammad Bagher Sadeghi	3	0	1	4	0
GK	(Iran)	12	Mohammad Rashid Mazaheri	27	8	4	39	20
TOTALS				30	8	5	43	20

=== Own goals ===
- Updated on 5 January 2016

Position	Nation	Number	Name	Pro League	Champions League	Hazfi Cup	Total
TOTALS				0	0	0	0

== Club ==
=== Coaching staff ===
Position	Name
Head coach	(Iran) Yahya Golmohammadi
Assistant coach	(Iran) Mojtaba Hosseini
Assistant coach	(Iran) Hassan Esteki
Goalkeeping coach	(Iran) Davoud Fanaei
Fitness coach	(Iran) Behzad Noshadi
Physiotherapist	(Iran) Abbas Moradi
Performance analyst	(Iran) Reza Nasr Esfahani
Analyzer	(Iran) Mohammad Askari
Doctor	(Iran) Dr. Amir Hossein Sharifianpour
Logistics	(Iran) Mahmoud Mehruyan
Team director	(Iran) Ali Shojaei

=== Other information ===
Chairman	(Iran) Saeed Azari
Ground (capacity and dimensions)	Foolad Shahr Stadium (20,000 / )

Updated to match played 4 January 2016

== See also ==
- 2015–16 Persian Gulf Pro League
- 2015–16 Hazfi Cup
- 2016 AFC Champions League
