= 2016 Iranian Super Cup =

Zob Ahan	Esteghlal Khuzestan
Hazfi Cup	Persian Gulf Pro League
4	2
- Extra time
- Date: 19 July 2016
- Venue: Foolad Shahr Stadium, Fooladshahr
- Man of the Match: Mehdi Mehdipour (Zob Ahan)
- Referee: Reza Mahdavi
- Attendance: 2,500

The 2016 Iranian Super Cup was the second Iranian Super Cup, held on 19 July 2016 between the 2015–16 Persian Gulf Pro League champions Esteghlal Khuzestan and the 2015–16 Hazfi Cup winners Zob Ahan Esfahan.

== Match ==
19 July 2016
20:45 (DST+03:30)

Zob Ahan Esfahan	4–2	Esteghlal Khuzestan
Tabrizi 68'; Feyzi 74'; Mehdipour 93', 113'	Report	Doraghi 42'; Zohaivi 52'

Foolad Shahr Stadium, Fooladshahr
Attendance: 2,500
Referee: Reza Mahdavi

Zob Ahan Esfahan
GK	(Iran) Mohammad Rashid Mazaheri
DF	(Iran) Mohammad Nejad Mehdi
DF	(Iran) Vahid Mohammadzadeh
DF	(Iran) Danial Esmaeilifar
DF	(Iran) Mehrdad Ghanbari
MF	(Iran) Mohammad Sattari	(substituted off) 60'
MF	(Iran) Mehdi Rajabzadeh (c)	(substituted off) 56'
MF	(Iran) Mehdi Mehdipour
MF	(Iran) Ehsan Pahlavan
FW	(Iran) Morteza Tabrizi
FW	(Iran) Yaser Feyzi	(substituted off) 105'
Substitutes:
MF	(Iran) Mohammadreza Abbasi	Booked	(substituted in) 56'
MF	(Iran) Mohammadreza Hosseini	(substituted in) 60'
FW	(Honduras) Jerry Bengtson	(substituted in) 105'
Manager:
(Iran) Yahya Golmohammadi

Esteghlal Khuzestan
GK	(Iran) Goudarz Davoudi	(yellow card) 55' (yellow-red card) 113'
DF	(Iran) Mohammad Tayyebi (c)
DF	(Iran) Ezzatollah Pourghaz	(substituted off) 95'
DF	(Iran) Aghil Kaabi	(yellow card) 72'
DF	(Iran) Danial Mahini	(yellow card) 21'	(substituted off) 27'
MF	(Iran) Meysam Doraghi
MF	(Iran) Farshad Salarvand
MF	(Iran) Farshad Janfaza
FW	(Iran) Rahim Mehdi Zohaivi
FW	(Iran) Mehdi Momeni	(substituted off) 70'
FW	(Iran) Hassan Beyt Saeed
Substitutes:
DF	(Iran) Jalal Abdi	(substituted in) 27'
MF	(Iran) Ali Asghar Ashouri	(substituted in) 70'
DF	(Iran) Hossein Bahrami	(substituted in) 95'
Manager:
(Iran) Sirous Pourmousavi
