= 2014–15 Zob Ahan F.C. season =

Zob Ahan
2014–15 season
- Chairman: Saeed Azari
- Manager: Yahya Golmohammadi
- Stadium: Foolad Shahr Stadium
- Iran Pro League: 4th
- Top goalscorer: League: Masoud Hassanzadeh (9); All: Masoud Hassanzadeh (10)
- Highest home attendance: 8,000 (26 September 2014 against Esteghlal)
- Lowest home attendance: 1,000 (19 August 2014 against Rah Ahan)
- Average home league attendance: League: 2,600; All: 2,921
| Home colours | Away colours | Third colours |

The 2014–15 season is Zob Ahan's 13th season in the Persian Gulf Pro League. They will also be competing in the Hazfi Cup . Naft Tehran is captained by Ghasem Hadadifar.

== First-team squad ==
As of 29 December 2014

Note: Flags indicate national team as defined under FIFA eligibility rules; some limited exceptions apply. Players may hold more than one non-FIFA nationality.

| No. | Pos. | Nation | Player |
|---|---|---|---|
| 1 | GK | IRI | Mohammad Bagher Sadeghi |
| 2 | DF | IRI | Hadi Mohammadi |
| 3 | DF | BRA | Carlos Santos |
| 4 | MF | IRI | Akbar Imani ^{U23} |
| 5 | MF | IRI | Ghasem Dehnavi |
| 8 | MF | IRI | Ghasem Hadadifar (Captain) |
| 10 | FW | IRI | Esmaeil Farhadi (3rd captain) |
| 11 | FW | IRI | Morteza Tabrizi |
| 12 | GK | IRI | Mohammad Rashid Mazaheri |
| 13 | DF | IRI | Pouria Seifpanahi |
| 15 | MF | IRI | Ehsan Pahlevan ^{U23} |
| 16 | DF | IRI | Hojjat Haghverdi ^{U23} |
| 17 | FW | IRI | Masoud Hassanzadeh |
| 18 | DF | LBN | Ali Hamam |

| No. | Pos. | Nation | Player |
|---|---|---|---|
| 19 | MF | IRI | Mehrdad Ghanbari |
| 21 | DF | IRI | Saeb Mohebi ^{U23} |
| 23 | FW | IRI | Danial Esmaeilifar ^{U23} |
| 25 | FW | IRI | Mohammadreza Abbasi ^{U21} |
| 26 | MF | IRI | Mehdi Mehdipour ^{U21} |
| 27 | DF | LBN | Walid Ismail |
| 28 | FW | IRI | Ali Khodadadi ^{U21} |
| 30 | FW | IRI | Mehdi Rajabzadeh (Vice captain) |
| 32 | FW | IRI | Amin Nasiri ^{U23} |
| 33 | GK | IRI | Mohammad Amin Bahrami ^{U21} |
| 34 | MF | IRI | Mohammadreza Baouj ^{U21} |
| 36 | FW | IRI | Farshad Mohammadi ^{U21} |
| 40 | GK | IRI | Peyman Salmani ^{U21} |
| 99 | FW | IRI | Kaveh Rezaei ^{U23} |

=== Loan list ===
Note: Flags indicate national team as defined under FIFA eligibility rules; some limited exceptions apply. Players may hold more than one non-FIFA nationality.

| No. | Pos. | Nation | Player |
|---|---|---|---|
| 7 | MF | IRI | Mohsen Mosalman (at Foolad until 30 June 2015) |

For recent transfers, see List of Iranian football transfers winter 2014–15.

== Transfers ==
=== In ===
| No | P | Name | Age | Moving from | Ends | Transfer fee | Type | Transfer window | Quota | Source |
|---|---|---|---|---|---|---|---|---|---|---|
| | GK | (Iran) Mohammad Bagher Sadeghi | 26 | Saipa | | N/A | Transfer | Summer | | |
| | MF | (Iran) Hojjat Haghverdi | 22 | Aboumoslem | 2016 | Free | Transfer | Summer | | |
| | MF | (Iran) Mehrdad Ghanbari | 25 | Padideh | | Free | Transfer | Summer | | |
| | DF | (Iran) Hadi Mohammadi | 24 | Damash | 2016 | Free | Transfer | Summer | | |
| | FW | (Iran) Masoud Hassanzadeh | 24 | Damash | 2017 | Free | Transfer | Summer | | |
| | MF | (Iran) Ghasem Dehnavi | 34 | Persepolis | 2017 | Free | Transfer | Summer | | |
| | FW | (Iran) Mostafa Shojaei | 32 | Mes Kerman | 2018 | Free | Transfer | Summer | | |
| | AM | (Iran) Danial Esmaeilifar | 22 | Payam Sanat Amol | 2017 | Free | Transfer | Summer | | |
| | DF | (Iran) Saeb Mohebi | 21 | Caspian Qazvin | | undisclosed | Transfer | Summer | | |
| | MF | (Iran) Hossein Doustdar | 28 | Giti Pasand | 2016 | Free | Transfer | Summer | | |
| | DF | (Iran) Pouria Seifpanahi | 28 | Mes Kerman | | Free | Transfer | Summer | | |
| | DF | (Lebanon) Ali Hamam | 28 | Nejmeh SC | 2017 | Free | Transfer | Summer | | |

== Competitions ==
=== Overview ===
| Competition | Started round | Current position / round | Final position / round | First match | Last match |
|---|---|---|---|---|---|
| Iran Pro League | — | — | | | |
| Hazfi Cup | Third Round | — | Winners | 11 Sep 2014 | 30 May 2015 |

Source: Competitions

==== Results summary ====
| Overall | | | | | | | | Home | | | | | | Away | | | | | |
| Pld | W | D | L | GF | GA | GD | Pts | W | D | L | GF | GA | GD | W | D | L | GF | GA | GD |
|---|---|---|---|---|---|---|---|---|---|---|---|---|---|---|---|---|---|---|---|
| 27 | 13 | 8 | 6 | 44 | 26 | +18 | 47 | 9 | 3 | 1 | 25 | 11 | +14 | 4 | 5 | 5 | 19 | 15 | +4 |

Last updated: 26 April 2015.
Source: Ipl Stats

==== Results by round ====
| Round | 1 | 2 | 3 | 4 | 5 | 6 | 7 | 8 | 9 | 10 | 11 | 12 | 13 | 14 | 15 | 16 | 17 | 18 | 19 | 20 | 21 | 22 | 23 | 24 | 25 | 26 | 27 | 28 | 29 | 30 |
|---|---|---|---|---|---|---|---|---|---|---|---|---|---|---|---|---|---|---|---|---|---|---|---|---|---|---|---|---|---|---|
| Ground | A | H | A | H | A | H | A | H | A | H | A | H | A | A | H | H | A | H | A | H | A | H | A | H | H | A | H | H | | |
| Result | L | D | L | D | D | D | L | W | L | W | D | L | D | W | W | W | L | W | W | W | D | W | W | D | D | W | W | W | | |
| Position | 14 | 12 | 16 | 13 | 13 | 13 | 14 | 12 | 14 | 12 | 13 | 13 | 13 | 13 | 9 | 9 | 9 | 8 | 6 | 6 | 6 | 6 | 6 | 6 | 6 | 6 | 5 | 4 | | |

Updated to match(es) played on 25 April 2015. Source: "Ipl".
A = Away; H = Home; W = Win; D = Draw; L = Loss

==== Matches ====
Win Draw Loss Postponed

| Date Round | Home | Score | Away | Location |

| 1 August 2014 1 | Saba Qom | 2–1 | Zob Ahan | Qom |
| | Kalantari 62' (pen.); Achille 86' | | Tabrizi 72' | Stadium: Yadegar Emam Stadium; Attendance: 18,000; Referee: Payam Heydari |

| 7 August 2014 2 | Zob Ahan | 0–0 | Tractor Sazi | Isfahan |
| | | | | Stadium: Foolad Shahr Stadium; Attendance: 2,000 |

| 15 August 2014 3 | Persepolis | 1–0 | Zob Ahan | Tehran |
| 19:55 | | | | Stadium: Azadi Stadium; Referee: (Iran) Mohammad Maleki |

| 19 August 2014 4 | Zob Ahan | 2–2 | Rah Ahan | Isfahan |
| 18:30 | | | | Stadium: Foolad Shahr Stadium; Referee: (Iran) Mohammadreza Akbarian |

| 24 August 2014 5 | Esteghlal Khuzestan | 1–1 | Zob Ahan | Ahvaz |
| 18:30 | | | | Stadium: Ghadir Stadium; Referee: (Iran) Shahin Haj Babaei |

| 29 August 2014 6 | Zob Ahan | 1–1 | Sepahan | Isfahan |
| 18:30 | | | | Stadium: Foolad Shahr Stadium; Referee: (Iran) Alireza Faghani |

| 4 September 2014 7 | Saipa | 1–0 | Zob Ahan | Alborz Province |
| 17:30 | | | | Stadium: Shahid Dastgerdi Stadium; Referee: (Iran) Hossein Zahedifar |

| 11 September 2014 8 | Zob Ahan | 1–0 | Paykan | Isfahan |
| 19:15 | | | | Stadium: Foolad Shahr Stadium; Referee: (Iran) Mehdi Seyedali |

| 19 September 2014 9 | Gostaresh Foulad | 3–2 | Zob Ahan | Tabriz |
| 20:10 | | | | Stadium: Gostaresh Foulad Stadium; Referee: (Iran) Payam Heidari |

| 26 September 2014 10 | Zob Ahan | 2–1 | Esteghlal | Isfahan |
| 17:00 | | | | Stadium: Foolad Shahr Stadium; Referee: (Iran) Alireza Faghani |

| 2 October 2014 11 | Naft Tehran | 0–0 | Zob Ahan | Tehran |
| 19:30 | | | | Stadium: Takhti Stadium; Referee: (Iran) Turaj Haghveri |

| 22 October 2014 12 | Zob Ahan | 0–1 | Foolad | Isfahan |
| 16:45 | | | | Stadium: Foolad Shahr Stadium; Referee: (Iran) Yadollah Jahanbazi |

| 31 October 2014 13 | Naft Masjed Soleyman | 1–1 | Zob Ahan | Masjed Soleyman |
| 15:45 | | | | Stadium: Behnam Mohammadi Stadium; Referee: (Iran) Reza Aadel |

| 7 November 2014 14 | Malavan | 1–3 | Zob Ahan | Bandar-e Anzali |
| 16:00 | | | | Stadium: Takhti Stadium (Anzali); Referee: (Iran) Alborz Hajipour |

| 21 November 2014 15 | Zob Ahan | 2–0 | Padideh | Isfahan |
| 15:30 | | | | Stadium: Foolad Shahr Stadium; Referee: (Iran) Seyed Zargar |

| 1 December 2014 16 | Zob Ahan | 3–1 | Saba Qom | Isfahan |
| 15:00 | | | | Stadium: Foolad Shahr Stadium; Referee: (Iran) Ahmad Salehi |

| 11 December 2014 17 | Tractor Sazi | 2–1 | Zob Ahan | Tabriz |
| 15:30 | | | | Stadium: Yadegar-e-Emam Stadium; Referee: (Iran) Omid Saeidfar |

| 30 January 2015 18 | Zob Ahan | 1–0 | Persepolis | Isfahan |
| 16:00 | | | | Stadium: Foolad Shahr Stadium; Referee: (Iran) Ghasem Vahedi |

| 4 February 2015 19 | Rah Ahan | 0–3 | Zob Ahan | Tehran |
| 17:00 | | | | Stadium: Rah Ahan Stadium; Referee: (Iran) Turaj Haghverdi |

| 8 February 2015 20 | Zob Ahan | 2–1 | Esteghlal Khuzestan | Isfahan |
| 15:30 | | | | Stadium: Foolad Shahr Stadium; Referee: (Iran) Gholamreza Jabbari |

| 12 February 2015 21 | Sepahan | 1–1 | Zob Ahan | Isfahan |
| 15:15 | | | | Stadium: Foolad Shahr Stadium; Referee: (Iran) Ali Safaei |

| 8 March 2015 22 | Zob Ahan | 4–1 | Saipa | Isfahan |
| 16:00 | | | | Stadium: Foolad Shahr Stadium; Referee: (Iran) Hassan Akrami |

| 12 March 2015 23 | Paykan | 1–3 | Zob Ahan | Qods |
| 18:30 | | | | Stadium: Shahre Qods Stadium; Referee: (Iran) Seyed Hossein Zargar; Man of the Match: Padovani |

| 3 April 2015 24 | Zob Ahan | 0–0 | Gostaresh Foulad | Isfahan |
| 16:30 | | | | Stadium: Foolad Shahr Stadium; Referee: (Iran) Yadollah Jahanbazi |

| 12 April 2015 25 | Esteghlal | 1–1 | Zob Ahan | Tehran |
| 17:30 | | | | Stadium: Azadi Stadium; Referee: (Iran) Ahmad Salehi |

| 16 April 2015 26 | Zob Ahan | 5–3 | Naft Tehran | Isfahan |
| 17:30 | Rezaei 21', 49', 69'; Mohammadi 41'; Esmaeilifar 44' | Report | Kamyabinia 45+2'; Amir Arsalan Motahari 78' (pen.); Kamyabinia (yellow card); Amir Arsalan Motahari (yellow card); Ebrahimi 90+2' | Stadium: Foolad Shahr Stadium; Referee: (Iran) Seyed Hossein Zargar; Man of the Match: Kaveh Rezaei |

| 25 April 2015 27 | Foolad | 0–2 | Zob Ahan | Ahvaz |
| 17:30 | | | | Stadium: Qadir Stadium |

| 1 May 2015 28 | Zob Ahan | 2–0 | Naft Masjed Soleyman | Isfahan |
| 17:30 | | | | Stadium: Foolad Shahr Stadium |

| 1 May 2015 29 | Zob Ahan | 2–0 | Malavan | Isfahan |
| 17:30 | | | | Stadium: Foolad Shahr Stadium |

=== Hazfi Cup ===
Win Draw Loss Postponed

| Date Round | Home | Score | Away | Location |

| 16 October 2014 74 | Zob Ahan | 3–0 | Payam Choghadak | Isfahan |
| 16:50 DST+03:30 | Rajabzadeh 44'; Imani 45+4'; Pahlevan 75' | | | Stadium: Fooladshahr Stadium; Attendance: 11,000 |

| 26 October 2014 88 | Esteghlal Khuzestan | 2–3 | Zob Ahan | Ahvaz |
| 15:00 DST+03:30 | Majidi 75'; Seifollahi 90+4' | | Dehnavi 37'; Rajabzadeh 48' (pen.), 90+2' | Stadium: Ghadir Stadium; Attendance: 2,000 |

| 27 November 2014 95 | Zob Ahan | 2 – 2 (a.e.t.) (3 – 0 p) | Esteghlal | Isfahan |
| 17:20 DST+03:30 | Dehnavi 23'; Hassanzadeh 75' | | Borhani 7'; Jassim 22' | Stadium: Fooladshahr Stadium; Attendance: 9,500 |
| | Penalties |
| | Rajabzadeh (penalty scored); Santos (penalty scored); Dehnavi (penalty scored) | | Beikzadeh (penalty missed); Ebrahimi (penalty missed); Borhani (penalty missed) |

| 5 December 2014 99 | Persepolis | 1 – 2 | Zob Ahan | Tehran |
| 15:15 DST+03:30 | Nouri 61' | | Tabrizi 69'; Santos 90+1' | Stadium: Azadi Stadium; Attendance: 40,000 |

| 1 June 2015 Final | Zob Ahan | 3–1 | Naft Tehran | Tehran |
| 19:15 | | | | Stadium: Azadi Stadium |
