= Hojjat Haghverdi =

Azerbaijani footballer (born 1993)

Personal information
- Date of birth: 3 February 1993 (age 33)
- Place of birth: Mashhad, Razavi Khorasan, Iran
- Height: 1.85 m (6 ft 1 in)
- Position: Center back

Team information
- Current team: Sumgayit
- Number: 3

Youth career
- 2006–2013: Aali-va-Herfei Babak Mashhad
- 2013–2014: Aboomoslem

Senior career*
Years	Team	Apps	(Gls)
2013–2014	Aboomoslem	15	(1)
2014–2017	Zob Ahan	53	(1)
2017–2021	Paykan	90	(3)
2021–2023	Sumgayit	40	(1)
2022	→ Tractor (loan)	7	(0)
2023–2025	Neftçi	66	(0)
2025–	Sumgayit	17	(2)

International career^{‡}
2021–	Azerbaijan	24	(1)
- * Club domestic league appearances and goals as of 22 June 2026 ‡ National team caps and goals as of 4 April 2024

Hojjat Haghverdi (Persian: حجت حق‌وردی, Azerbaijani: Höccət Haqverdi; born 3 February 1993) is an Azerbaijani professional footballer who plays as a defender for Sumgayit. Born in Mashhad, Iran, he plays for the Azerbaijan national team.

== Club career ==
=== Aboomoslem ===
He joined Aboomoslem U21 in summer 2014 and was directly promoted to the first team. He made four appearances in the 2013–14 Azadegan League.

=== Zob Ahan ===
Haghverdi joined Zob Ahan in summer 2014 with a 3-year contract. He made his debut for Zob Ahan on 12 September 2014 against Paykan as a starter.

=== Sumgayit ===
On 12 January 2021, Sumgayit announced the signing of Haghverdi. On 16 June 2021, Haghverdi signed a new two-year contract with Sumgayit.

== International career ==
=== Iran U23 ===
He was invited to Iran U-23 training camp by Nelo Vingada to preparation for Incheon 2014 and 2016 AFC U-22 Championship (Summer Olympic qualification).

=== Azerbaijan ===
He made his debut for Azerbaijan national football team on 2 June 2021 in a friendly against Belarus.

== Club career statistics ==
As of 9 January 2021

Club	Division	Season	League		Hazfi Cup		Asia		Total	
Club	Division	Season	Apps	Goals	Apps	Goals	Apps	Goals	Apps	Goals
Aboomoslem	Division 1	2013–14	4	0	0	0	—		4	0
Zob Ahan	Pro League	2014–15	5	0	1	0	—		6	0
Zob Ahan	Pro League	2015–16	12	0	2	0	0	0	14	0
Zob Ahan	Pro League	2016–17	9	0	4	0	2	0	15	0
Zob Ahan	Total		30	0	7	0	2	0	39	0
Paykan	Pro League	2017–18	28	1	1	0	—		29	1
Paykan	Pro League	2018–19	26	0	2	0	—		28	1
Paykan	Pro League	2019–20	29	1	1	0	—		30	0
Paykan	Pro League	2020–21	7	1	0	0	—		7	1
Paykan	Total		90	3	4	0	—		94	3
Career Total			120	3	11	0	2	0	133	3

== International goals ==
No.	Date	Venue	Opponent	Score	Result	Competition
1.	22 September 2022	Anton Malatinský Stadium, Trnava, Slovakia	Slovakia	2–1	2–1	2022–23 UEFA Nations League C

== Honours ==
=== Club ===
Zob Ahan

- Hazfi Cup (2): 2014–15, 2015–16
- Iranian Super Cup (1): 2016
