= Ali Hamam =

Lebanese footballer (born 1986)

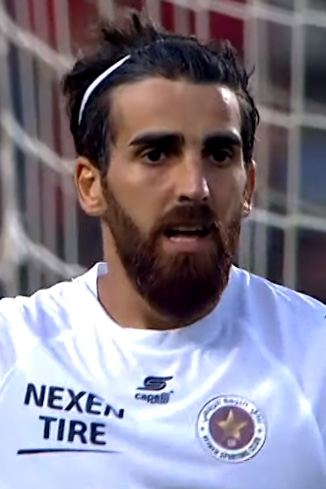
- Hamam with Nejmeh in 2019

Personal information
- Full name: Ali Nizar Hamam
- Date of birth: 25 August 1986 (age 40)
- Place of birth: Anqoun, Lebanon
- Height: 1.77 m (5 ft 10 in)
- Position: Right-back

Senior career*
Years	Team	Apps	(Gls)
–2006	Taqadom Anqoun		(1)
2006–2007	Ahli Saida		(1)
2007–2014	Nejmeh		(13)
2014–2018	Zob Ahan	80	(4)
2018–2024	Nejmeh	83	(9)
2024–2026	Jwaya	19	(0)

International career
2009–2019	Lebanon	56	(3)
- * Club domestic league appearances and goals as of 21 November 2025

Ali Nizar Hamam (Arabic: علي نزار حمام; born 25 August 1986) is a Lebanese professional footballer who plays as a right-back.

After playing for Taqadom Anqoun and Ahli Saida in his early career, Hamam joined Nejmeh in 2008, winning two league titles and one Super Cup. After six seasons at Nejmeh, Hamam moved to Iran at Zob Ahan, where he won the Hazfi Cup twice and the Super Cup once. He returned to Nejmeh in 2018, winning one league title, two FA Cups, and two Elite Cups. Hamam played for Jwaya between 2024 and 2026.

Hamam played for the Lebanon national team between 2009 and 2019, and was capped 56 times, scoring three goals. He was part of the team that played in the 2019 AFC Asian Cup, Lebanon's first participation through regular qualification.

== Club career ==
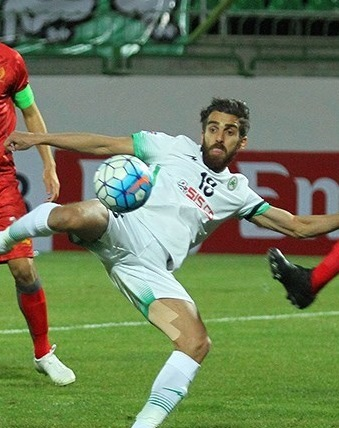
Hamam with Zob Ahan in 2016

Hamam started his career with Taqadom Anqoun. After playing for Ahli Saida, Hamam moved to Nejmeh in August 2008.

In July 2014, Hamam joined Iranian club Zob Ahan. In 2020, he was voted best right-back of the 2016 AFC Champions League. Hamam terminated his contract with Zob Ahan in December 2017, and returned to Nejmeh ahead of the second half of the 2017–18 season on a four-and-a-half-year contract. In September 2021, he renewed his contract with Nejmeh for one season.

In August 2024, Hamam joined Jwaya. He departed the club in August 2026.

== International career ==
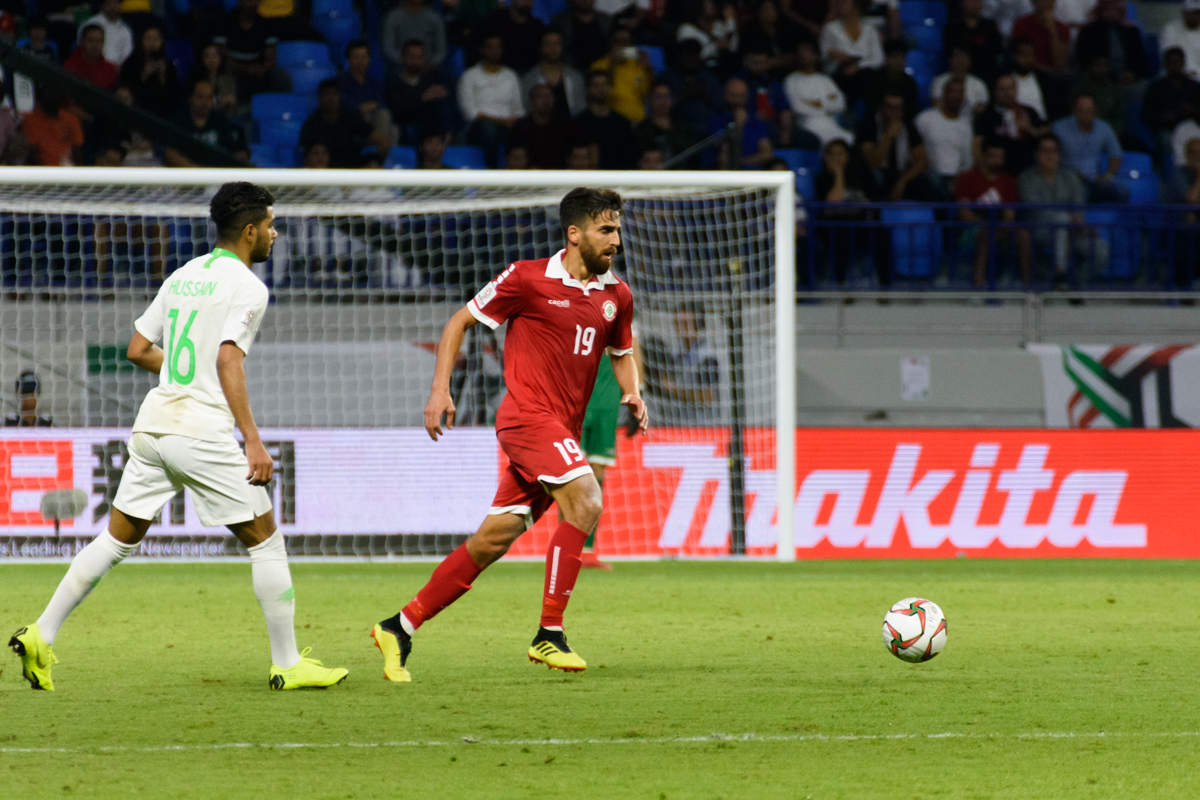
Hamam with Lebanon at the 2019 AFC Asian Cup

In December 2018, Hamam was called up for the 2019 AFC Asian Cup. On 16 October 2019, Hamam announced his retirement from international football, with three goals in 56 matches.

== Style of play ==
Hamam's main qualities are his experience on the field and his defensive abilities, as well as his attacking threat.

== Career statistics ==
=== Club ===
As of 25 November 2017

Club	Division	Season	League		Hazfi Cup		Asia		Total	
Club	Division	Season	Apps	Goals	Apps	Goals	Apps	Goals	Apps	Goals
Zob Ahan	Persian Gulf Pro League	2014–15	25	0	5	0	–	–	30	0
Zob Ahan	Persian Gulf Pro League	2015–16	24	1	5	0	7	0	36	1
Zob Ahan	Persian Gulf Pro League	2016–17	24	2	4	0	4	0	32	2
Zob Ahan	Persian Gulf Pro League	2017–18	7	1	0	0	0	0	7	1
Career Total			80	4	14	0	11	0	107	4

=== International ===
Scores and results list Lebanon's goal tally first, score column indicates score after each Hamam goal.

List of international goals scored by Ali Hamam
No.	Date	Venue	Opponent	Score	Result	Competition
1	15 November 2015	Saida Municipal Stadium, Saida, Lebanon	Laos	4–0	7–0	2018 FIFA World Cup qualification
2	10 October 2017	Camille Chamoun Sports City Stadium, Beirut, Lebanon	North Korea	4–0	5–0	2019 AFC Asian Cup qualification
3	9 November 2017	National Stadium, Kallang, Singapore	Singapore	1–0	1–0	Friendly

== Honours ==
Nejmeh

- Lebanese Premier League: 2008–09, 2013–14, 2023–24
- Lebanese FA Cup: 2021–22, 2022–23; runner-up: 2020–21
- Lebanese Elite Cup: 2018, 2021
- Lebanese Super Cup: 2009; runner-up: 2021

Zob Ahan

- Iranian Hazfi Cup: 2014–15, 2015–16
- Iranian Super Cup: 2016

Individual

- IFFHS All-time Lebanon Men's Dream Team
- Fans' Asian Champions League XI: 2016
- Lebanese Premier League Team of the Season: 2008–09, 2011–12, 2012–13, 2013–14

== See also ==
- List of Lebanon international footballers
