= Mohammadreza Abbasi =

Iranian footballer

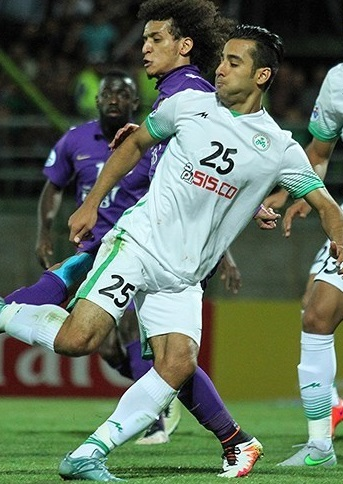
- Abbasi with Zob Ahan in 2016 AFC Champions League

Personal information
- Full name: Mohammadreza Abbasi
- Date of birth: 27 July 1996 (age 30)
- Place of birth: Minab, Iran
- Height: 1.85 m (6 ft 1 in)
- Positions: Winger; attacking midfielder

Team information
- Current team: Malavan
- Number: 96

Youth career
- 2010– 2014: Zob Ahan

Senior career*
Years	Team	Apps	(Gls)
2012–2016	Zob Ahan B		
2014–2020	Zob Ahan	83	(4)
2020–2022	Foolad	45	(0)
2022–2023	Tractor	16	(2)
2023–2025	Nassaji Mazandaran	36	(1)
2026	Gol Gohar	4	(0)
2026–	Malavan	6	(1)

International career^{‡}
2014	Iran U20	1	(0)
- * Club domestic league appearances and goals as of 25 January 2018 ‡ National team caps and goals as of 10 March 2016

Mohammadreza Abbasi (born July 27, 1996) is an Iranian football winger who plays for Malavan.

== Club career ==
=== Zob Ahan ===
Abbasi was part of Zob Ahan Academy since 2010. He was promoted to the first team by Yahya Golmohammadi in summer 2014 with a 3-year contract. He made his debut for Zob Ahan on September 4, 2014, against Saipa as a starter.

== Club Career Statistics ==
As of 1 May 2019.

Club	Division	Season	League		Hazfi Cup		Asia		Total	
Club	Division	Season	Apps	Goals	Apps	Goals	Apps	Goals	Apps	Goals
Zob Ahan	Pro League	2014–15	5	0	2	0	–	–	7	0
Zob Ahan	Pro League	2015–16	9	0	1	0	5	1	15	1
Zob Ahan	Pro League	2016–17	15	1	3	1	1	0	19	2
Zob Ahan	Pro League	2017–18	12	2	0	0	2	0	14	2
Zob Ahan	Pro League	2018–19	21	0	1	0	4	0	26	0
Zob Ahan	Pro League	2019–20	0	0	0	0	0	0	0	0
Career Total			62	3	7	1	12	1	81	5

== Honours ==
=== Club ===
Zob Ahan

- Hazfi Cup (2): 2014–15, 2015–16
- Iranian Super Cup (1): 2016

Foolad

- Hazfi Cup (1): 2020–21
- Iranian Super Cup: 2021
