= List of Iran Pro League all-time top goal scorers =

A

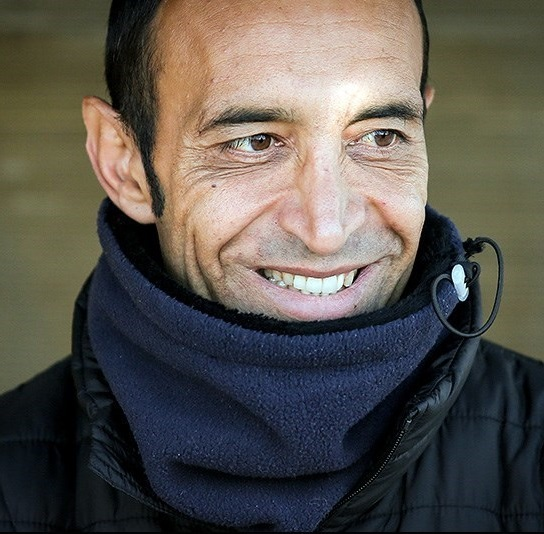
Reza Enayati has most Goal in Iran pro League with 147 goals.

== List ==
The list below presents the all-time top scorers of the Iranian League, since its inception on 2 November 2001. Reza Enayati has scored 147 goals and currently sits on top of the topscorers list in Persian gulf pro league.

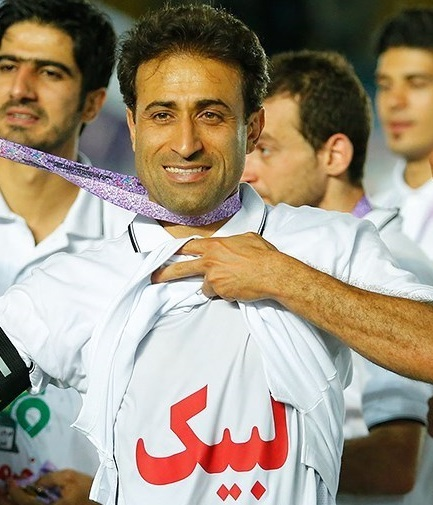
Mehdi Rajabzadeh second most goalscorer in Iran pro league with 116 goals.

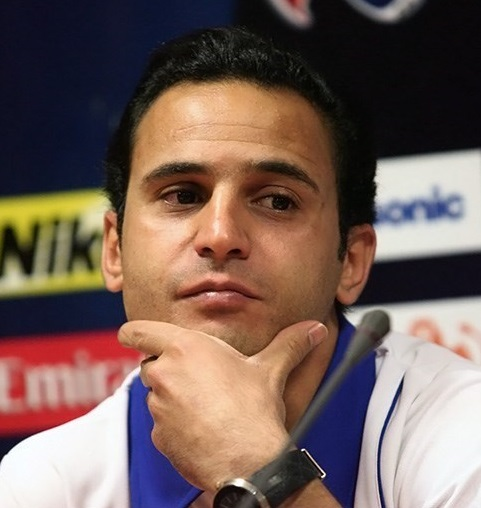
Arash Borhani, third most goalscorer with 115 goals

As of end of the 2025–26 season.

Rank	player	Previous League Club (s)	Goals
1	(Iran) Reza Enayati	Aboomoslem, Esteghlal F.C., Sepahan, Mes Kerman, Saba Qom, Padideh, FC Mashhad	147
2	(Iran) Mehdi Rajabzadeh	Zob Ahan Esfahan F.C., Sanat Mes Kerman F.C., Fajr Sepasi Shiraz F.C.	116
3	(Iran) Arash Borhani	Esteghlal F.C., PAS Tehran F.C.,	115
4	(Brazil) Luciano Pereira	Foolad, Sepahan, Gostaresh, Sanat Naft, Mes Rafsanjan	103
5	(Iran) Fereydoon Fazli	Tractor Sazi, Aboomoslem, Esteghlal Ahvaz, Saba Battery	85
6	(Brazil) Edinho	Mes Kerman, Tractor Sazi	82
7	(Iran) Ali Alipour	Rah Ahan- Persepolis	81
7	(Iran) Sajjad Shahbazzadeh	Saipa, Esteghlal, Sepahan, Mes Rafsanjan, Esteghlal Khuzestan	81
9	(Iran) Mohammad Reza Khalatbari	Shamoushak, Aboomoslem, Zob Ahan, Sepahan, Persepolis, Gostaresh, Saipa, Padideh	79
10	(Iran) Jalal Rafkhaei	Malavan, Zob Ahan	79
11	(Iran) Karim Ansarifard	Saipa, Persepolis, Tractor Sazi	77

== See also ==
- Season by season IPL top goal scorers
- Top-division league all-time top goal scorers
