= Mehrdad Ghanbari =

Iranian footballer (born 1989)

Personal information
- Full name: Mehrdad Ghanbari
- Date of birth: 22 November 1989 (age 36)
- Place of birth: Sari Saravi rika , Iran
- Height: 1.72 m (5 ft 8 in)
- Positions: Left back; midfielder

Team information
- Current team: Kheybar Khorramabad
- Number: 19

Youth career
- 2006–2010: Sanat Sari

Senior career*
Years	Team	Apps	(Gls)
2009–2011	Sanat Sari	16	(1)
2011–2013	Shahrdari Tabriz	51	(4)
2013–2014	Padideh	13	(0)
2014–2017	Zob Ahan	53	(3)
2017–	Gostaresh Foolad	2	(0)
2018–2020	Mes Kerman		
2020–2021	Zob Ahan	22	(0)
2021-	Kheybar Khorramabad	119	(29)
- * Club domestic league appearances and goals as of 17 February 2018

Mehrdad Ghanbari (Persian: مهرداد قنبری; born November 22, 1989) is an Iranian footballer who plays for F.C. Kheybar Khorramabad in the Iran Pro League.

== Club career ==
=== Zob Ahan ===
In the summer of 2014 Ghanbari with a three-year contract to join Zob Ahan. Mehrdad played the most minutes for Zob Ahan in the 2014–15 season by playing in all matches of the season. But in the season after cruciate ligament injury in the match against Gostaresh in the Hazfi Cup with injury and missed the rest of the season.

== Club career statistics ==
As of 1 June 2015

Club performance			League		Cup		Continental		Total	
Season	Club	League	Apps	Goals	Apps	Goals	Apps	Goals	Apps	Goals
Iran			League		Hazfi Cup		Asia		Total	
2011–12	Shahrdari Tabriz	Pro League	24	2	0	0	–	–	24	2
2012–13	Shahrdari Tabriz	Pro League	27	2	0	0	–	–	27	2
2013–14	Padideh	Division 1	13	0	1	0	–	–	14	0
2014–15	Zob Ahan	Pro League	30	2	5	0	–	–	35	2
2015–16	Zob Ahan	Pro League	8	1	2	0	1	0	11	1
2016–17	Zob Ahan	Pro League	15	0	0	0	0	0	15	0
2017–18	Gostaresh Foolad	Pro League	2	0	1	0	–	–	3	0
Career total			112	7	8	0	1	0	121	7

- Assists

Season	Team	Assists
14–15	Zob Ahan	0

== Honours ==
=== Club ===
Zob Ahan

- Hazfi Cup (2): 2014–15, 2015–16
- Iranian Super Cup (1): 2016
