= Taqaddom =

Taqaddom or Taqaddum (Arabic: تقدم) can refer to:

- Taqaddum (Sudan) – Civilian coalition in Sudan
- Taqaddom (Lebanon) – political party in Lebanon
- Al-Taqaddum Air Base – Iraqi airbase
- Al Taqadom Anqoun Club – Lebanese association football club
