= Peyman Salmani =

Iranian footballer

Personal information
- Date of birth: 18 April 1994 (age 32)
- Place of birth: Isfahan, Iran
- Height: 1.85 m (6 ft 1 in)
- Position: Goalkeeper

Youth career
- –2014: Zob Ahan

Senior career*
| Years | Team | Apps | (Gls) |
| 2014–2017 | Zob Ahan | 1 | (0) |
| 2017–2019 | Fajr Sepasi | 43 | (0) |
| 2019–2020 | Iranjavan | | |
- * Club domestic league appearances and goals

Peyman Salmani (Persian: پيمان سلمانی; born 18 April 1994) is an Iranian former football goalkeeper.

== Club career ==
=== Zob Ahan ===
Salmani was part of Zob Ahan Academy from 2010. He was promoted to the first team by Rasoul Korbekandi in summer 2012. He made his debut for Zob Ahan on 1 May 2015 against Naft Masjed Soleyman as a substitute for Mohammad Rashid Mazaheri.

== Club Career Statistics ==
As of 1 May 2015.

| Club | Division | Season | League | | Hazfi Cup | | Asia | | Total | |
| Club | Division | Season | Apps | Goals | Apps | Goals | Apps | Goals | Apps | Goals |
|---|---|---|---|---|---|---|---|---|---|---|
| Zob Ahan | Pro League | 2014–15 | 1 | 0 | 0 | 0 | – | – | 1 | 0 |
| Career Total | | | 1 | 0 | 0 | 0 | 0 | 0 | 1 | 0 |

== Honours ==
=== Club ===
Zob Ahan

- Hazfi Cup (2): 2014–15, 2015–16
- Iranian Super Cup (1): 2016
