= Mehdi Rajabzadeh =

Iranian footballer

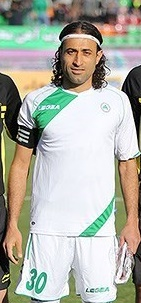

Personal information
- Date of birth: 21 June 1978 (age 48)
- Place of birth: Kazeroun, Iran
- Height: 1.74 m (5 ft 9 in)
- Position: Attacking midfielder

Team information
- Current team: Fajr Sepasi (manager)

Youth career
- 1992–1998: Jam Shiraz

Senior career*
Years	Team	Apps	(Gls)
1998–2003	Fajr Sepasi	17	(3)
2003–2007	Zob Ahan	103	(49)
2007–2008	Emirates	20	(6)
2008–2009	Al Dhafra	5	(1)
2009–2010	Mes Kerman	36	(10)
2010–2011	Zob Ahan	32	(6)
2011–2012	Fajr Sepasi	32	(10)
2012–2018	Zob Ahan	161	(38)

International career
2004–2008	Iran	16	(4)

Managerial career
- 2018: Zob Ahan (assistant)
- 2021–2022: Qashqai
- 2022–2024: Fajr Sepasi
- 2024–2025: Pars Jonoubi Jam
- 2026–: Fajr Sepasi
- * Club domestic league appearances and goals

Mehdi Rajabzadeh (Persian: مهدی رجب‌زاده; born 21 June 1978) is an Iranian football manager and former player who manages Fajr Sepasi in Persian Gulf Pro League. A midfielder, he is the second-top scorer in the history of the Persian Gulf Pro League.

== Club career ==
Rajabzadeh started his career at Fajr Sepasi where he impressed enough to be transferred to Zob Ahan in 2003. During the 2006–07 season Rajabzadeh became the top goalscorer by scoring 17 goals. He is one of the top all time IPL goalscorers.

Rajabzadeh is the second-top scorer in the history of this competition after Gholamreza Enayati, scoring 116 goals with the shirts of Fajr Sepasi Shiraz, Zobahan Isfahan and Mes Kerman in the Premier League.

== International career ==
Rajabzadeh made his debut for Iran against Qatar in February 2004. In October 2006, he joined Team Melli in an LG cup tournament held in Jordan. He scored his first goal for Iran on October 4, 2006 in a match against Iraq.

As of February 2008, he had 17 caps and 4 goals for Iran.

== Career statistics ==
=== Club ===
As of 15 May 2018

Appearances and goals by club, season and competition
Club	Season	League			National cup (Note: Includes Hazfi Cup, President's Cup.)		Asia		Total	
Club	Season	Division	Apps	Goals	Apps	Goals	Apps	Goals	Apps	Goals
Fajr Sepasi	2001–02	Iran Pro League	9	2	1	0	2	0	12	2
Fajr Sepasi	2002–03	Iran Pro League	8	1	–		–		8	1
Fajr Sepasi	Total		17	3	1	0	2	0!20	3	
Zob Ahan	2003–04	Iran Pro League	21	9	–		5	0	26	9
Zob Ahan	2004–05	Iran Pro League	23	9	3	1	–		26	10
Zob Ahan	2005–06	Iran Pro League	29	14	1	1	–		30	15
Zob Ahan	2006–07	Iran Pro League	30	17	2	0	–		32	17
Zob Ahan	Total		103	49	6	2	5	0	114	51
Emirates	2007–08	UAE Pro League	20	6	–		–		20	6
Dhafra	2008–09	UAE Pro League	5	1	–		–		5	1
Mes Kerman	2008–09	Iran Pro League	4	0	0	0	–		4	0
Mes Kerman	2009–10	Iran Pro League	32	10	–		7	4	39	14
Mes Kerman	Total		36	10	0	0	7	4	43	14
Zob Ahan	2010–11	Iran Pro League	32	6	1	0	11	1	44	7
Fajr Sepasi	2011–12	Iran Pro League	32	10	1	0	–		33	10
Zob Ahan	2012–13	Iran Pro League	31	8	0	0	–		31	8
Zob Ahan	2013–14	Iran Pro League	25	9	1	0	–		26	9
Zob Ahan	2014–15	Iran Pro League	28	4	5	4	–		33	8
Zob Ahan	2015–16	Iran Pro League	30	6	5	1	6	2	41	9
Zob Ahan	2016–17	Iran Pro League	29	9	4	1	6	1	39	11
Zob Ahan	2017–18	Iran Pro League	18	2	0	0	7	1	25	3
Zob Ahan	Total		161	38	15	6	19	4	195	48
Career total			406	123	26	8	44	9	476	140

=== International ===
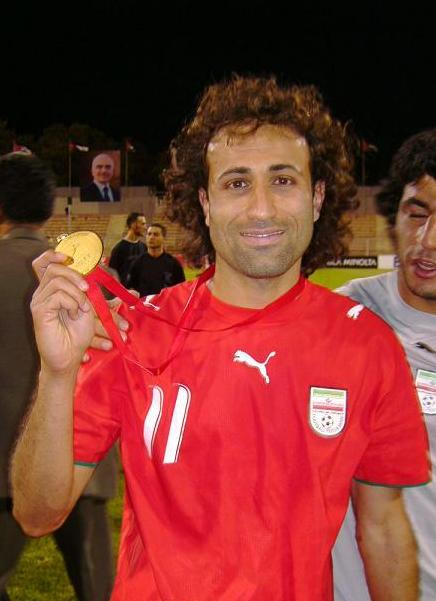
Rajbazadeh after winning WAFF Championship with Iran in 2007

Scores and results list Iran's goal tally first.

#	Date	Venue	Opponent	Score	Result	Competition
1	4 October 2006	Amman International Stadium, Amman	Iraq	1–0	2–0	Friendly
2	12 January 2007	Sheikh Zayed Stadium, Abu Dhabi	United Arab Emirates	1–0	2–0	Friendly
3	20 June 2007	Amman International Stadium, Amman	Palestine	2–0	2–0	WAFF 2007
4	22 June 2007	Amman International Stadium, Amman	Jordan	1–0	1–0	WAFF 2007

== Honours ==
Fajr Sepasi

- Hazfi Cup: 2000–01; runner-up 2001–02, 2002–03

Zob Ahan

- AFC Champions League runner-up: 2010
- Iran Pro League runner-up: 2004–05
- Hazfi Cup: 2014–15, 2015–16
- Iranian Super Cup: 2016

Iran

- WAFF Championship: 2007
- LG Cup: 2006

Individual

- Iran Pro League top goalscorer: 2006–07 (17 goals)
- Top scorer in Iran Pro League (116 goals)
