= Saeb Mohebi =

Iranian footballer

Personal information
- Date of birth: 28 August 1993 (age 33)
- Place of birth: Roudbar, Iran
- Height: 1.82 m (6 ft 0 in)
- Position: Right-back

Team information
- Current team: Paykan
- Number: 6

Youth career
- –2012: Sorkhpoushan Qazvin
- 2012–2014: Caspian Qazvin

Senior career*
Years	Team	Apps	(Gls)
2013–2014	Caspian Qazvin		
2014–2016	Zob Ahan	9	(0)
2016–2017	Rah Ahan	8	(0)
2017–2019	Malavan	35	(3)
2019	Navad Urmia	5	(0)
2019–2020	Rayka Babol	25	(1)
2020–2025	Havadar	109	(5)
2025–2026	Shams Azar	21	(2)
2026–	Paykan	12	(2)

International career^{‡}
2014–2016	Iran U23	4	(0)
- * Club domestic league appearances and goals as of 1 May 2025 ‡ National team caps and goals as of 22 January 2016

Saeb Mohebi (Persian: صائب محبی; born 28 August 1993) is an Iranian footballer who plays as a defender for Paykan in the Persian Gulf Pro League.

== Club career ==
=== Caspian Qazvin ===
Mohebi was part of Caspian Qazvin from club establishment date in 2012 to 2014.

=== Zob Ahan ===
He joined Zob Ahan in summer 2014 with a 3 years contract. He made his debut for Zob Ahan in fixture 4 of 2014–15 Iran Pro League against Rah Ahan as a substitute for Sina Ashouri.

== Club career statistics ==
As of 25 April 2015

Club	Division	Season	League		Hazfi Cup		Asia		Total	
Club	Division	Season	Apps	Goals	Apps	Goals	Apps	Goals	Apps	Goals
Zob Ahan	Pro League	2014–15	4	0	1	0	–	–	5	0
Zob Ahan	Pro League	2015–16	3	0	1	0	–	–	4	0
Career Total			7	0	2	0	0	0	9	0

== International career ==
=== U23 ===
He was invited to Iran U-23 training camp by Nelo Vingada to preparation for Incheon 2014 and 2016 AFC U-22 Championship (Summer Olympic qualification).

== Personal life ==
On 23 February 2026, while playing for Havadar, Mohebi could be seen refusing to celebrate a goal scored by his teammate Amin Ghaseminejad against Fard Alborz, in solidarity with those killed in the 2025–2026 Iranian protests.

== Honours ==
=== Club ===
Zob Ahan

- Hazfi Cup (2): 2014–15, 2015–16
- Iranian Super Cup (1): 2016
