= Morteza Tabrizi =

Iranian footballer

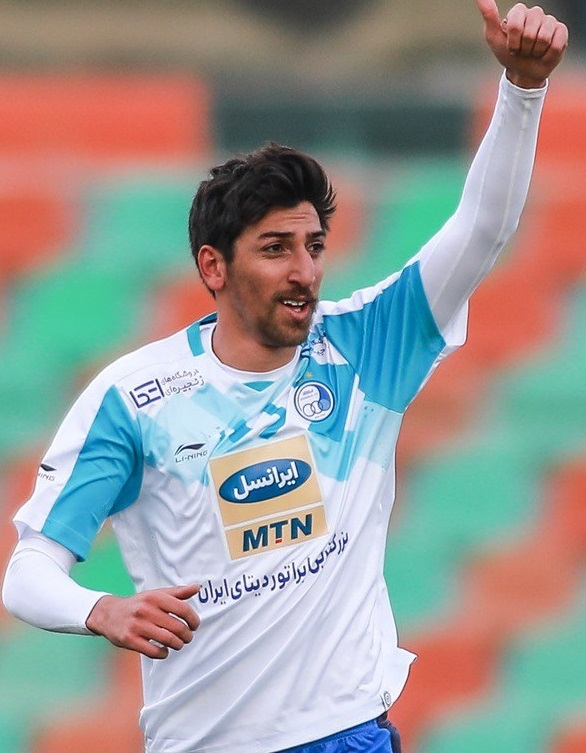
- Tabrizi playing for Esteghlal at 2019 AFC Champions League

Personal information
- Date of birth: 6 January 1991 (age 35)
- Place of birth: Hamedan, Iran
- Height: 1.87 m (6 ft 2 in)
- Position: Forward

Team information
- Current team: Zob Ahan Esfahan
- Number: 10

Youth career
- –2008: Talar Vahdat Hamedan
- 2008–2010: Mes Kerman

Senior career*
Years	Team	Apps	(Gls)
2010–2013	Pas Hamedan	35	(5)
2013–2018	Zob Ahan	138	(39)
2018–2021	Esteghlal	35	(6)
2021–2023	Gol Gohar Sirjan	45	(9)
2023–2024	Aluminium Arak	11	(0)
2024–2025	Zob Ahan Esfahan	14	(0)
2025	Peykan		

International career^{‡}
2012–2014	Iran U23	5	(2)
- * Club domestic league appearances and goals as of 4 April 2025 ‡ National team caps and goals as of 14 August 2015

Morteza Tabrizi (Persian: مرتضی تبریزی, born 6 January 1991) is an Iranian professional footballer who plays as a forward for Persian Gulf Pro League side Peykan.

== Club career ==
=== Pas Hamedan ===
Tabrizi was part of Pas Academy since 2010. He promoted to the first team as summer 2013 with two years contract.

=== Zob Ahan ===
Morteza joined Zob Ahan in 2013 on a three-year contract. Tabrizi won the 2015 Hazfi Cup in his second season with Zob Ahan, he defended the title with Zob Ahan the following year and once again won the Hazfi Cup. In the 2017–18 Persian Gulf Pro League, he became the second-best scorer with 13 goals.

=== Esteghlal ===
On 31 July 2018, Tabrizi officially signed for Esteghlal on a two-year contract. He was assigned the number 11 shirt at Esteghlal, the same number he used to wear at Zob Ahan.

Tabrizi made his debut for Esteghlal on 10 August 2018 in a 3–0 League victory over Tractor Sazi, scoring his first goal for the club within 28 minutes after a receiving a backheel pass from Farshid Esmaeili.

== International career ==
=== Youth ===
He was regularly called up for the Iran U22 team by coach Alireza Mansourian in 2012 and 2013. On 28 June 2012, he scored two goals in a 7–0 victory against the Maldives U23 team.

=== Senior ===
Tabrizi was called up to the senior Iran squad by Carlos Queiroz for friendlies against Macedonia and Kyrgyzstan in June 2016.

== Career statistics ==
As of 20 April 2021

Club	Season	League			Hazfi Cup		Continental^{1}		Other		Total	
Club	Season	Division	Apps	Goals	Apps	Goals	Apps	Goals	Apps	Goals	Apps	Goals
Pas Hamedan	2010–11	Persian Gulf Pro League	2	0	0	0	—		0	0	2	0
Pas Hamedan	2011–12	Azadegan League	12	3	0	0	—		0	0	12	3
Pas Hamedan	2012–13	Azadegan League	21	2	0	0	—		0	0	21	2
Pas Hamedan	Total		35	5	0	0	—		0	0	35	5
Zob Ahan	2013–14	Persian Gulf Pro League	26	2	1	0	—		0	0	27	2
Zob Ahan	2014–15	Persian Gulf Pro League	28	7	5	1	—		0	0	33	8
Zob Ahan	2015–16	Persian Gulf Pro League	26	7	5	2	8	1	0	0	40	10
Zob Ahan	2016–17	Persian Gulf Pro League	27	10	6	2	6	2	1	1	39	14
Zob Ahan	2017–18	Persian Gulf Pro League	30	13	1	0	8	4	0	0	39	17
Zob Ahan	Total		137	39	18	5	22	7	1	1	178	52
Esteghlal	2018–19	Persian Gulf Pro League	24	5	1	0	2	1	0	0	27	6
Esteghlal	2019-20	Persian Gulf Pro League	11	0	2	0	3	0	0	0	16	0
Esteghlal	Total		35	5	3	0	5	1	0	0	43	6
Gol Gohar	2020-21	Persian Gulf Pro League	14	1	3	0	—		0	0	17	1
Gol Gohar	2021-22	Persian Gulf Pro League	28	7	2	1	0	0	0	0	30	8
Gol Gohar	2022-23	Persian Gulf Pro League	25	5	0	0	0	0	0	0	25	5
Gol Gohar	Total		67	13	5	1	0	0	0	0	72	14
Aluminium	2023-24	Persian Gulf Pro League	11	0	0	0	0	0	0	0	11	0
Career Total			285	62	26	6	27	8	1	1	339	77

== Honours ==
=== Club ===
Zob Ahan

- Hazfi Cup: 2014–15, 2015–16
- Iranian Super Cup: 2016

=== Individual ===
- Persian Gulf Pro League Team of the Year (1): 2017–18
