= Mohammad Rashid Mazaheri =

Iranian footballer

Mohammad Mazaheri
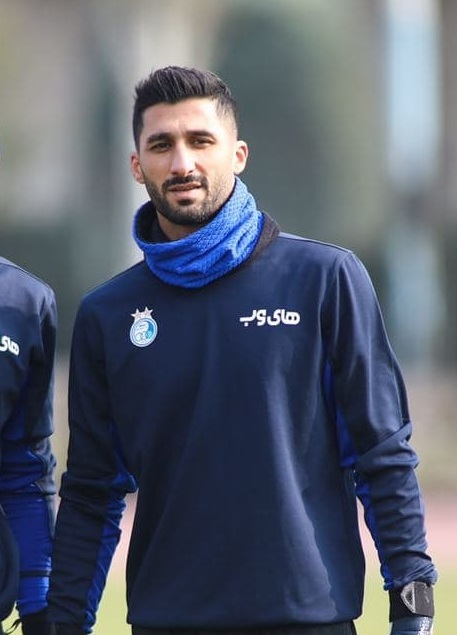
- Rashid Mazaheri with Esteghlal in 2020

Personal information
- Full name: Mohammad-Rashid Mazaheri
- Date of birth: 18 May 1989 (age 37)
- Place of birth: Gachsaran, Iran
- Height: 1.92 m (6 ft 4 in)
- Position: Goalkeeper

Youth career
- 2002–2009: Fajr Sepasi

Senior career*
| Years | Team | Apps | (Gls) |
| 2009–2011 | Esteghlal Ahvaz | 12 | (0) |
| 2011–2014 | Foolad | 7 | (0) |
| 2014–2019 | Zob Ahan | 131 | (0) |
| 2019–2020 | Tractor | 29 | (0) |
| 2020–2022 | Esteghlal | 20 | (0) |
| 2022–2023 | Sepahan | 15 | (0) |
| 2023 | Paykan | 13 | (0) |
| 2023–2024 | Nassaji | 14 | (0) |

International career
| 2010 | Iran U20 | 3 | (0) |
| 2010–2011 | Iran U23 | 4 | (0) |
| 2015–2021 | Iran | 3 | (0) |
- * Club domestic league appearances and goals as of 3 January 2024

Mohammad Rashid Mazaheri (Persian: محمد رشید مظاهری; born 18 May 1989) is an Iranian former footballer who played as a goalkeeper. He was a member of the Iranian national team. He's disappeared since February 2026 after criticizing Ali Khamenei during the 2025–2026 Iranian protests. Mazaheri has been under arrest since. Islamic Regime officials claim he had been detained after seeking to illegally cross the border without providing further evidence.

== Club career ==
Mazaheri spent seven years in the youth academy of Fajr Sepasi before joining the youth teams of Esteghlal Ahvaz in 2009. He started his senior career with Esteghlal Ahvaz in 2010. Previously, he played for the Moghavemat Sepasi youth team.

=== Zob Ahan ===
Mazaheri joined Zob Ahan midway through the 2013–14 season, mainly featuring as a reserve. He earned his starting place in the 2014–15 season and won the Hazfi Cup. Mazaheri lead Zob Ahan to the Round of 16 of the 2016 AFC Champions League as the first placed team in their group. In the 2018 AFC Champions League, he scored the highest goal keeper at the top of the list for the best goalkeeper this season.

=== Tractor S.C. ===
On 8 June 2019, Mazaheri signed a 4 years contract with Tractor in the Iran Pro League.

== International career ==
Mazaheri started his career with the national team playing for Iran U-20 team. He played for the Iran U-23, and participated in the 2010 Asian Games in Guangzhou, China. In May 2018 he was named in Iran's preliminary squad for the 2018 World Cup in Russia.

== Personal life ==
In 2011, prior to his departure to Kyrgyzstan to participate in Football at the 2012 Summer Olympics – Men's Asian Qualifiers Preliminary Round 1, Mazaheri was involved in an altercation outside his house in Ahvaz. While reports vary, reports state that Mazaheri was physically assaulted and the windows to his house were broken. It was reported in Iranian newspapers in July 2011 that Mehdi Rahmati, Iranian international, asked as one of his conditions on joining Persepolis that "Esteghlal Ahvaz goalie" be signed as his reserve. It is widely speculated that the goalie mentioned was Mazaheri, since they both got their start in Fajr Sepasi youth ranks.

In 2019, Mazaheri was summoned and suspended by the Football Federation Islamic Republic of Iran for the government's spending taxpayer money on constructing football stadiums in Iraq. During the 2019–2020 Iranian protests, Mazaheri had taken to his Instagram and called on authorities not to execute protesters. This led to his summoning by the Islamic Revolutionary Guard Corps intelligence unit and subsequent arrest. Mazaheri was also summoned and suspended by the Football Federation for supporting the 2021 Iranian water protests.

=== Disappearance ===
On 24 February 2026, in light of the 2025–2026 Iranian protests, Mazaheri posted a picture on his Instagram combining Ali Khamenei with the word "Satan", and wrote an accompanying caption saying: "Khamenei! Know that your command over this holy land has ended". The next day, there were reports about a potential raid on his home or arrest of Mazaheri, with his wife Maryam Abdullahi expressing concern about his safety. He has been missing since then.

== Career statistics ==
=== Club ===
As of 28 May 2021

| Club | Season | League | | | Hazfi Cup | | Continental^{1} | | Other | | Total | |
| Club | Season | Division | Apps | Goals | Apps | Goals | Apps | Goals | Apps | Goals | Apps | Goals |
|---|---|---|---|---|---|---|---|---|---|---|---|---|
| Esteghlal Ahvaz | 2009–10 | Persian Gulf Pro League | 5 | 0 | 0 | 0 | - | - | 0 | 0 | 5 | 0 |
| Esteghlal Ahvaz | 2010–11 | Azadegan League | 12 | 0 | 0 | 0 | 0 | 0 | 0 | 0 | 12 | 0 |
| Esteghlal Ahvaz | Total | | 17 | 0 | 0 | 0 | — | | 0 | 0 | 17 | 0 |
| Foolad | 2011–12 | Persian Gulf Pro League | 1 | 0 | 0 | 0 | - | - | 0 | 0 | 1 | 0 |
| Foolad | 2012–13 | Persian Gulf Pro League | 3 | 0 | 0 | 0 | - | - | 0 | 0 | 3 | 0 |
| Foolad | 2013–14 | Persian Gulf Pro League | 3 | 0 | 0 | 0 | 0 | 0 | 0 | 0 | 3 | 0 |
| Foolad | Total | | 7 | 0 | 0 | 0 | 0 | 0 | 0 | 0 | 7 | 0 |
| Zob Ahan | 2013–14 | Persian Gulf Pro League | 2 | 0 | 0 | 0 | - | - | 0 | 0 | 2 | 0 |
| Zob Ahan | 2014–15 | Persian Gulf Pro League | 19 | 0 | 5 | 0 | - | - | 0 | 0 | 24 | 0 |
| Zob Ahan | 2015–16 | Persian Gulf Pro League | 27 | 0 | 4 | 0 | 8 | 0 | 0 | 0 | 39 | 0 |
| Zob Ahan | 2016–17 | Persian Gulf Pro League | 28 | 0 | 5 | 0 | 6 | 0 | 1 | 0 | 40 | 0 |
| Zob Ahan | 2017–18 | Persian Gulf Pro League | 29 | 0 | 1 | 0 | 9 | 0 | 0 | 0 | 40 | 0 |
| Zob Ahan | 2018–19 | Persian Gulf Pro League | 25 | 0 | 1 | 0 | 7 | 0 | 0 | 0 | 28 | 0 |
| Zob Ahan | Total | | 131 | 0 | 15 | 0 | 30 | 0 | 1 | 0 | 177 | 0 |
| Tractor | 2019–20 | Persian Gulf Pro League | 29 | 0 | 1 | 0 | - | - | 0 | 0 | 30 | 0 |
| Esteghlal | 2020–21 | Persian Gulf Pro League | 19 | 0 | 2 | 0 | 6 | 0 | 0 | 0 | 27 | 0 |
| Esteghlal | 2021–22 | Persian Gulf Pro League | 1 | 0 | 0 | 0 | 0 | 0 | 0 | 0 | 1 | 0 |
| Esteghlal | Total | | 20 | 0 | 2 | 0 | 6 | 0 | 0 | 0 | 28 | 0 |
| Sepahan | 2021–22 | Persian Gulf Pro League | 13 | 0 | 0 | 0 | 6 | 0 | 0 | 0 | 19 | 0 |
| Sepahan | 2022–23 | Persian Gulf Pro League | 3 | 0 | 0 | 0 | 0 | 0 | 0 | 0 | 3 | 0 |
| Sepahan | Total | | 16 | 0 | 0 | 0 | 6 | 0 | 0 | 0 | 22 | 0 |
| Paykan | 2022–23 | Persian Gulf Pro League | 13 | 0 | 2 | 0 | 0 | 0 | 0 | 0 | 15 | 0 |
| Nassaji | 2023–24 | Persian Gulf Pro League | 14 | 0 | 0 | 0 | 4 | 0 | 0 | 0 | 18 | 0 |
| Total | | | 247 | 0 | 20 | 0 | 46 | 0 | 1 | 0 | 314 | 0 |

=== International ===
Statistics accurate as of match played 13 November 2017.

Iran
| Year | Apps | Goals |
|---|---|---|
| 2016 | 2 | 0 |
| 2017 | 1 | 0 |
| Total | 3 | 0 |

== Honours ==
Zob Ahan

- Hazfi Cup: 2014–15, 2015–16
- Iranian Super Cup: 2016

Tractor

- Hazfi Cup: 2019–20

Awards

- Fans' Asian Champions League XI: 2016
