= Masoud Hassanzadeh =

Iranian footballer

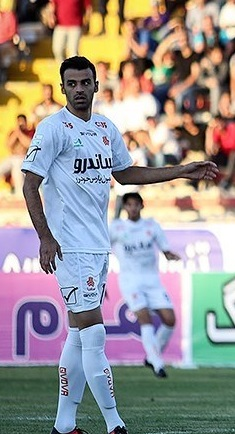

Personal information
- Full name: Masoud Hassanzadeh Hajabi
- Date of birth: 12 April 1991 (age 35)
- Place of birth: Tehran, Iran
- Height: 1.85 m (6 ft 1 in)
- Position: Center forward

Youth career
- 2008–2009: Esteghlal
- 2009–2011: Damash Tehran
- 2011–2012: Naft Tehran

Senior career*
| Years | Team | Apps | (Gls) |
| 2012 | Mes Rafsanjan | 9 | (0) |
| 2012–2014 | Damash Gilan | 29 | (4) |
| 2014–2016 | Zob Ahan | 44 | (15) |
| 2016–2017 | Saipa | 13 | (1) |
| 2017–2018 | Sepahan | 16 | (7) |
| 2018–2019 | Zob Ahan | 0 | (0) |

International career
| 2012–2014 | Iran U22 | 1 | (1) |
| 2015 | Iran | 1 | (0) |
- * Club domestic league appearances and goals

Masoud Hassanzadeh (Persian: مسعود حسن زاده; born 12 April 1991) is an Iranian former footballer who played as a forward.

== Club career ==
=== Early years ===
Hassanzadeh started his career with Esteghlal at youth levels. Later he joined Damash Tehran U19 & Naft Tehran U21.

=== Damash Gilan ===
After a half-season at Division 1 with Mes Rafsanjan, he joined Pro League side Damash. He made his debut against Fajr Sepasi on 9 February 2013 as a substitute. He scored his first goal for Damash against Foolad on 10 August 2013.

=== Zob Ahan ===
He joined Zob Ahan in summer 2014 with a fee around R4 billion. Hassanzadeh scored in the penalty shoot out in the final of the 2016 Hazfi Cup against Esteghlal, a game which Zob Ahan won.

==== Club career statistics ====
As of 1 June 2018

| Club | Division | Season | League | | Hazfi Cup | | Asia | | Total | |
| Club | Division | Season | Apps | Goals | Apps | Goals | Apps | Goals | Apps | Goals |
|---|---|---|---|---|---|---|---|---|---|---|
| Mes Rafsanjan | Division 1 | 2012–13 | 9 | 0 | 0 | 0 | – | – | 9 | 0 |
| Damash | Pro League | 2012–13 | 2 | 0 | 0 | 0 | – | – | 2 | 0 |
| Damash | Pro League | 2013–14 | 27 | 4 | 0 | 0 | – | – | 27 | 4 |
| Zob Ahan | Pro League | 2014–15 | 25 | 9 | 3 | 1 | – | – | 28 | 10 |
| Zob Ahan | Pro League | 2015–16 | 19 | 6 | 4 | 0 | 5 | 1 | 28 | 7 |
| Saipa | Pro League | 2016–17 | 13 | 1 | 1 | 0 | – | – | 14 | 1 |
| Sepahan | Pro League | 2016–17 | 13 | 7 | 0 | 0 | – | – | 13 | 7 |
| Sepahan | Pro League | 2017–18 | 3 | 0 | 0 | 0 | – | – | 3 | 0 |
| Zob Ahan | Pro League | 2018–19 | 0 | 0 | 0 | 0 | 0 | 0 | 0 | 0 |
| Career Total | | | 111 | 27 | 8 | 1 | 5 | 1 | 124 | 29 |

== International career ==
=== U–22 ===
He invited to Iran U–22 squad to compete 2013 AFC U-22 Championship by Alireza Mansourian.

=== Senior ===
Hassanzadeh was invited to the Iran senior team on 12 December 2014 by Carlos Queiroz for upcoming South Africa training camp. He made his debut against Sweden on 31 March 2015.

== Personal life ==
Masoud was born in Tehran and Hassanzadeh's family is Iranian Azerbaijani from the Tabriz city of East Azerbaijan.

== Honours ==
=== Club ===
Zob Ahan

- Hazfi Cup (2): 2014–15, 2015–16
