= Yaser Feyzi =

Iranian footballer

Personal information
- Date of birth: 27 July 1992 (age 34)
- Place of birth: Kamyaran, Iran
- Height: 1.81 m (5 ft 11 in)
- Position: Forward

Youth career
- –2012: Shahrdari Kamyaran

Senior career*
Years	Team	Apps	(Gls)
2012–2014	Shahrdari Kamyaran	14	(0)
2014–2015	Iranjavan Khormoj		
2015	Etehad Kamyaran		
2016	Oxin Alborz	27	(19)
2016–2017	Zob Ahan	20	(1)
2017–2018	Mes Kerman	26	(7)
2018–2019	Gol Reyhan	24	(7)
2019–2020	Mes Kerman	19	(6)
2021	Baadraan	0	(0)
2021–2022	Mes Kerman	7	(1)
2022–2023	Van Pars	0	(0)
2023–2024	Mes Soongoun	2	(3)
2024	Mes Kerman	10	(2)
2024	Shahrdari Noshahr		
- * Club domestic league appearances and goals as of 10 June 2024

Yaser Feyzi (Persian: یاسر فیضی; born 27 July 1992) is an Iranian football winger.

== Club career ==
=== Oxin Alborz ===
Feyzi joined 2nd Division side Oxin Alborz in the summer of 2015. He helped his team to promote to the second tiered Azadegan League and became top scorer with 19 goals in 27 games.

=== Zob Ahan ===
Feyzi joined Persian Gulf Pro League side Zob Ahan in June 2016 after a successful campaign in the Iranian third tier. He scored his first competitive goal in a 4–2 victory against Esteghlal Khuzestan in the 2016 Iranian Super Cup.

== Club career statistics ==
As of 1 May 2015

Club	Division	Season	League		Hazfi Cup		Asia		Other		Total	
Club	Division	Season	Apps	Goals	Apps	Goals	Apps	Goals	Apps	Goals	Apps	Goals
Oxin Alborz	2nd Division	2015–16	27	19	–	–	–	–	–	–	27	19
Zob Ahan	PGPL	2016–17	20	1	3	0	1	0	1	1	25	2
Career Total			41	20	1	0	0	0	1	1	42	21
