= Pouya Seifpanahi =

Iranian footballer

Pouya Seif Panahi
Personal information
- Full name: Pouya Seif Panahi
- Date of birth: 13 August 1986 (age 40)
- Place of birth: Iran
- Position: Defender

Senior career*
Years	Team	Apps	(Gls)
2007–2008	Shirin Faraz	21	(1)
2008–2009	Mehrkam Pars	?	(1)
2009–2012	Pas Hamedan	87	(0)
2012–2014	Mes Kerman	23	(0)
2014–2015	Zob Ahan	5	(0)
2016–2017	Saba Qom	12	(0)
- * Club domestic league appearances and goals as of 10 May 2013

Pouya Seif Panahi (Persian: پویا سیف پناهی; born August 13, 1986) is an Iranian footballer who played for Zob Ahan in Iran's Premier Football League.

== Club career ==
In 2009, Seif Panahi joined Pas Hamedan.

=== Club Career Statistics ===
- Last Update: 20 April 2015

Club performance			League		Cup		Continental		Total	
Season	Club	League	Apps	Goals	Apps	Goals	Apps	Goals	Apps	Goals
Iran			League		Hazfi Cup		Asia		Total	
2007–08	Shirin Faraz	Pro League	21	1			-	-		
2008–09	Mehrkam	Division 1		1			-	-		
2009–10	Pas Hamedan	Pro League	33	0		0	-	-		0
2010–11	Pas Hamedan	Pro League	32	0			-	-		
2011–12	Pas Hamedan	Division 1	22	0			-	-		
2012–13	Mes Kerman	Pro League	15	0	0	0	0	0	15	0
2013–14	Mes Kerman	Pro League	8	0			-	-	8	0
2014–15	Zob Ahan	Pro League	5	0	1	0	-	-	6	0
Career total			136	2			0	0		

- Assist Goals

Season	Team	Assists
10–11	Pas	0
12–13	Mes Kerman	0

== Honours ==
=== Club ===
Zob Ahan

- Hazfi Cup (1): 2014–15
