= Nima Taheri =

Iranian footballer

Personal information
- Date of birth: 15 April 1997 (age 29)
- Place of birth: Shahinshahr, Iran
- Height: 1.88 m (6 ft 2 in)
- Position: Centre-back

Youth career
- 2007–2015: Zob Ahan

Senior career*
Years	Team	Apps	(Gls)
2015–2020	Zob Ahan	3	(0)

International career
2016–2017	Iran U20	4	(0)
2017	Iran U23	2	(0)
- * Club domestic league appearances and goals

Nima Taheri (Persian: نيما طاهری; born 15 April 1997) is an Iranian former football defender.
