= Meysam Doraghi =

Iranian Football Midfielder

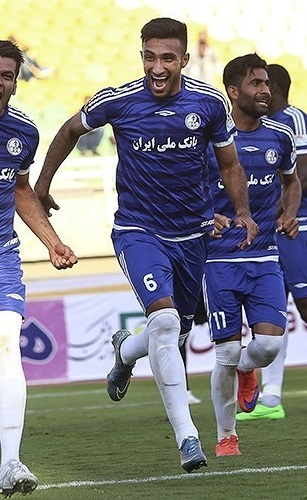

Personal information
- Full name: Meysam Doraghi
- Date of birth: June 12, 1990 (age 36)
- Place of birth: Ahvaz, Iran
- Height: 1.85 m (6 ft 1 in)
- Position: Defensive midfielder

Team information
- Current team: Shahin Bushehr

Youth career
- 2006–2011: Esteghlal Ahvaz

Senior career*
Years	Team	Apps	(Gls)
2008–2011	Esteghlal Ahvaz	14	(0)
2013–2014	Naft Masjed Soleyman	21	(1)
2014–2018	Esteghlal Khuzestan	93	(5)
2017	→ Foolad (loan)	9	(0)
2018–2020	Foolad	28	(0)
2020–	Shahin Bushehr	0	(0)
2020–2021	Khooshe Talaei Saveh F.C.		
2021	Esteghlal Khuzestan F.C.		
- * Club domestic league appearances and goals as of 19 January 2017

Meysam Doraghi (Persian: میثم دورقی) is an Iranian football midfielder who plays for Shahin Bushehr in the Persian Gulf Pro League.

== Club career ==
Doraghi started his career with Esteghlal Ahvaz from youth levels. He promoted to first team in summer 2008. As summer 2013 he joined Naft Masjed Soleyman. He was a regular starter in 2013–14 season and helped Naft MIS in promoting to 2014–15 Iran Pro League. As summer 2014 he joined Esteghlal Khuzestan with a 3-years contract.

== Club career statistics ==
As of 12 December 2014

Club	Division	Season	League		Hazfi Cup		Asia		Total	
Club	Division	Season	Apps	Goals	Apps	Goals	Apps	Goals	Apps	Goals
Esteghlal; Ahvaz	Pro League	2008–09	0	0	0	0	–	–	0	0
Esteghlal; Ahvaz	Pro League	2009–10	2	0	1	0	–	–	3	0
Esteghlal; Ahvaz	Division 1	2010–11	12	0	2	0	–	–	14	0
Naft MIS	Division 1	2013–14	21	1	4	0	–	–	25	1
Esteghlal Kh.	Pro League	2014–15	13	0	2	0	–	–	15	0
Esteghlal Kh.	Pro League	2015-16	20	0	0	0	–	–	20	0
Esteghlal Kh.	Pro League	2016-17	27	2	1	0	6	0	33	2
Esteghlal Kh.	Pro League	2017-18	13	2	0	0	0	0	13	2
Career Totals			108	5	10	0	6	0	124	5

== Honours ==
Esteghlal Khuzestan

- Iran Pro League (1): 2015–16
- Iranian Super Cup runner-up: 2016
