= Hamid Erfani =

Iranian Goalkeeper

Personal information
- Date of birth: 21 March 1988 (age 38)
- Place of birth: Iran
- Height: 1.88 m (6 ft 2 in)
- Position: Goalkeeper

Team information
- Current team: Etehad Moein

Youth career
- –2008: Steel Azin

Senior career*
Years	Team	Apps	(Gls)
2008–2012	Tarbiat Yazd		
2012–2013	Shahrdari Arak	8	(0)
2013–2014	Yazd Louleh	14	(0)
2014–2016	Giti Pasand	45	(0)
2016–2017	Zob Ahan	2	(0)
2017–2018	Mes Kerman	22	(0)
2018–2019	Malavan	17	(0)
2019–2020	Mes Rafsanjan	12	(0)
2020–2023	Shahid Ghandi Yazd	32	(1)
2024–	Etehad Moein		
- * Club domestic league appearances and goals as of 21 May 2023

Hamid Erfani (Persian: حميد عرفانی; born 21 March 1988) is an Iranian football goalkeeper who plays for Etehad Moien.
