= Marquinho (footballer, born August 1986) =

Brazilian footballer

Personal information
- Full name: Marco Aurélio Iubel
- Date of birth: 7 August 1986 (age 40)
- Place of birth: Paraná, Brazil
- Height: 1.76 m (5 ft 9 1/2 in)
- Position: Winger

Senior career*
Years	Team	Apps	(Gls)
2007	J. Malucelli		(1)
2007–2010	Vitória Guimarães	43	(4)
2010–2012	Marítimo	14	(2)
2010–2012	→ Marítimo B	2	(0)
2012	Vitória	5	(0)
2013	Vila Nova	14	(4)
2013–2014	Paraná	0	(0)
2013	→ Mirassol (loan)	2	(0)
2014	Saba Qom	13	(5)
2015	Cabofriense	10	(3)
2015	Cuiabá	6	(0)
2016	Zob Ahan	5	(0)
2016	Batatais		
2019	San Francisco Glens	6	(4)
- * Club domestic league appearances and goals as of 00:21, 3 June 2019 (UTC)

Marco Aurélio Iubel (born 7 August 1986), simply known as Marquinho is a Brazilian professional footballer playing for San Francisco Glens SC in USL League Two as a winger.

== Club Career Statistics ==
As of June 3, 2019.

Club	Division	Season	League		Hazfi Cup		Asia		Total	
Club	Division	Season	Apps	Goals	Apps	Goals	Apps	Goals	Apps	Goals
Zob Ahan	Pro League	2015–16	5	0	0	0	2	0	7	0
Career Total			5	0	0	0	2	0	7	0
