= Mehdi Mehdipour =

Iranian footballer

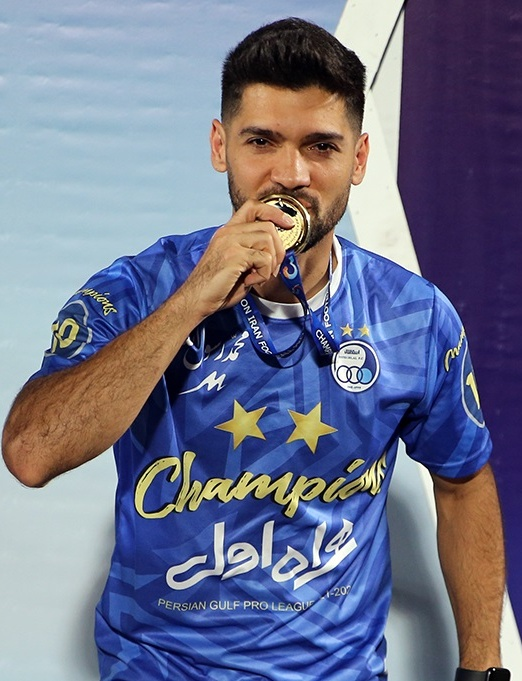
- Mehdipour in May 2022

Personal information
- Date of birth: 25 October 1994 (age 32)
- Place of birth: Isfahan, Iran
- Height: 1.77 m (5 ft 10 in)
- Position: Central midfielder

Team information
- Current team: Nassaji
- Number: 22

Youth career
- 2006–2009: Sepahan
- 2010–2013: Zob Ahan
- 2013–2014: Rah Ahan

Senior career*
Years	Team	Apps	(Gls)
2013–2014	Rah Ahan	6	(0)
2014–2020	Zob Ahan	93	(2)
2018–2019	→ Tractor (loan)	43	(3)
2020–2025	Esteghlal	94	(5)
2025–	Nassaji	13	(0)

International career^{‡}
2009–2010	Iran U17		
2011–2012	Iran U20		
2014–2016	Iran U23	1	(1)
2022	Iran	3	(0)
- * Club domestic league appearances and goals as of 15 May 2025 ‡ National team caps and goals as of 12 June 2022

Mehdi Mehdipour (Persian: مهدی مهدی‌پور; born 25 October 1994) is an Iranian footballer who played as a midfielder for Persian Gulf Pro League club Nassaji.

== Club career ==
=== Early years ===
He started his career with Sepahan for youth levels. Later he joined Zob Ahan academy.

=== Rah Ahan ===
He joined Tehrani side with his former coach at Zob Ahan, Mansour Ebrahimzadeh in summer 2013. He made his debut against Iranian club Esteghlal on January 4, 2014, as a substitute. He was released from Rah Ahan as December 2014.

=== Zob Ahan ===
Mehdipour returned to Zob Ahan on 26 December 2014. In the 2015–2016 season, Mahdipour was one of the key players of Zob Ahan. Mehdipour played in the return match with Gostaresh Foolad F.C. during the 2015–16 season, scoring two goals.

=== Esteghlal ===
On 10 October 2020 he signed a 3-year contract with Esteghlal F.C, and on 25 June 2021 he scored his first goal against Gol Gohar Sirjan. He also scored a second goal from a free kick in the last minutes of the match against Sepahan in the last week of the 2020–21 Persian Gulf Pro League season.

== Club career statistics ==
As of 15 May 2025

Club	Division	Season	League		Hazfi Cup		Asia		Other		Total	
Club	Division	Season	Apps	Goals	Apps	Goals	Apps	Goals	Apps	Goals	Apps	Goals
Rah Ahan	Persian Gulf Pro League	2013–14	6	0	1	0	–		–		7	0
Zob Ahan	Persian Gulf Pro League	2014–15	8	0	1	0	–		–		9	0
Zob Ahan	Persian Gulf Pro League	2015–16	25	2	5	1	8	0	–		38	3
Zob Ahan	Persian Gulf Pro League	2016–17	29	0	5	0	6	0	1	2	42	2
Zob Ahan	Persian Gulf Pro League	2017–18	10	0	1	0	2	0	–		13	0
Zob Ahan	Total		72	2	12	1	16	0	1	2	101	5
Tractor	Persian Gulf Pro League	2017–18	14	1	1	0	5	0	–		20	1
Tractor	Persian Gulf Pro League	2018–19	29	2	1	0	–		–		30	2
Tractor	Total		43	3	2	0	5	0	–		50	3
Zob Ahan	Persian Gulf Pro League	2019–20	21	0	2	0	0	0	–		23	0
Esteghlal	Persian Gulf Pro League	2020–21	23	2	5	0	6	0	–		34	2
Esteghlal	Persian Gulf Pro League	2021–22	30	1	2	0	–		–		32	1
Esteghlal	Persian Gulf Pro League	2022–23	19	1	3	0	–		1	0	23	1
Esteghlal	Persian Gulf Pro League	2023–24	22	1	1	0	–		–		23	1
Esteghlal	Total		94	5	11	0	6	0	1	0	112	5
Nassaji	Pro League	2024–2025	13	0	2	0	–		–		15	0
Career totals			249	10	30	1	27	0	2	2	308	13

== International career ==
=== U23 ===
He was invited to the Iran U-23 training camp by Nelo Vingada in preparation for Incheon 2014 and the 2016 AFC U-23 Championship (Summer Olympic qualification). He was named to the Iran U23 final roster for Incheon 2014. He made his senior debut for the Iran national football team on 24 March 2022 against Korea Republic.

== Honours ==
=== Club ===
Zob Ahan

- Hazfi Cup: 2014–15, 2015–16
- Iranian Super Cup: 2016

Esteghlal

- Persian Gulf Pro League: 2021–22
- Hazfi Cup runners-up: 2020–21, 2022–23
- Iranian Super Cup: 2022
