= Ehsan Pahlavan =

Iranian footballer

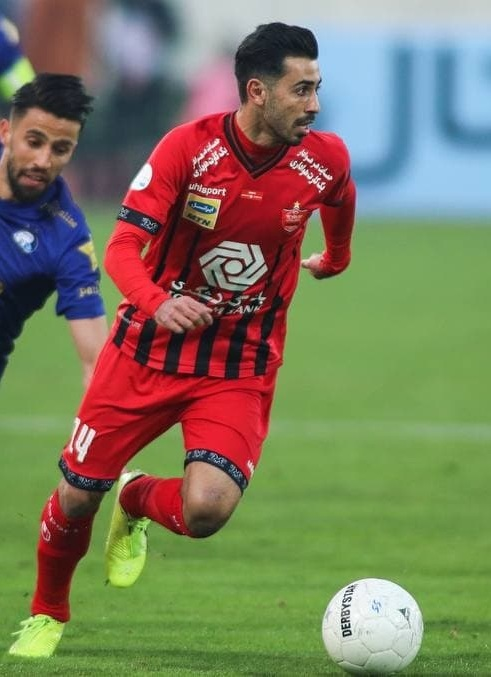
- Pahlavan with Persepolis in 2021

Personal information
- Date of birth: 25 July 1993 (age 33)
- Place of birth: Bojnourd, North Khorasan, Iran
- Height: 1.72 m (5 ft 8 in)
- Positions: Wide midfielder; winger

Team information
- Current team: Fajr Sepasi
- Number: 7

Youth career
- 2002–2011: Babak Mashhad F.C.

Senior career*
Years	Team	Apps	(Gls)
2011–2013	Gostaresh Foulad	3	(1)
2013	→ Zob Ahan (loan)	11	(1)
2013–2020	Zob Ahan	126	(9)
2014	→ Sepahan (loan)	1	(0)
2018–2019	→ Tractor (loan)	28	(6)
2020–2022	Persepolis	51	(0)
2022–2023	Foolad	25	(0)
2023–2024	Sepahan	6	(0)
2024–2025	Foolad	39	(2)
2025–2026	Zob Ahan	20	(0)
2026–	Fajr Sepasi	10	(1)

International career^{‡}
2011–2014	Iran U20	14	(1)
2014–2016	Iran U23	20	(3)
2017–2021	Iran	1	(0)
- * Club domestic league appearances and goals as of 18 April 2025 ‡ National team caps and goals as of 4 June 2017

Ehsan Pahlevan (Persian: احسان پهلوان; born 25 July 1993) is an Iranian professional footballer who plays as a wide midfielder for Persian Gulf Pro League club Fajr Sepasi.

== Club career ==
=== Zob Ahan ===
He joined Zob Ahan in the winter break of 2012–13 Season on loan from Gostaresh until the end of the season. At the end of the season, his transfer completed and he joined Zob Ahan officially.

=== Sepahan ===
On 12 January 2014, Zob Ahan accepted a bid to loan Pahlavan to Sepahan until the end of the season. He joined Sepahan on the following day, where he played one league match and one Hazfi Cup match. At the end of the season, he returned to Zob Ahan.

=== Persepolis ===
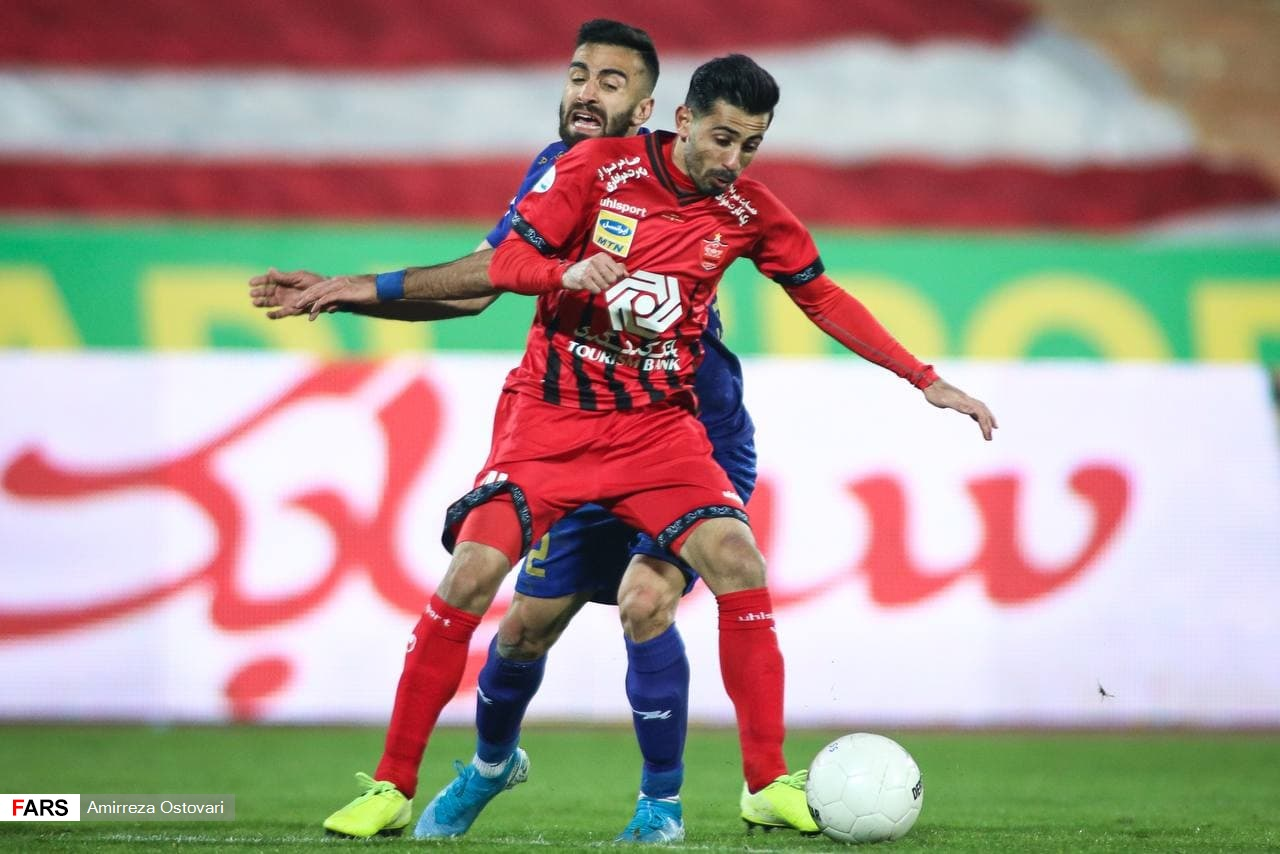
Pahlevan in action with Persepolis against Esteghlal in January 2021

On 2 September 2020, Pahlavan signed a two-year contract with Persian Gulf Pro League champions Persepolis.

== Club career statistics ==
As of 2 June 2022

Club	League	Season	Apps	Goals	Apps	Goals	Apps	Goals	Apps	Goals	Apps	Goals
Iran			League		Hazfi Cup		Asia		Other		Total	
Gostaresh	Division 1	2011–12	3	1	0	0	—		_		3	1
Gostaresh	Division 1	2012–13	0	0	0	0	—		_		0	0
Zob Ahan (loan)	Pro League	2012–13	11	1	0	0	—		_		11	1
Zob Ahan	Pro League	2013–14	6	0	0	0	—		_		6	0
Sepahan (loan)	Pro League	2013–14	1	0	0	0	0	0	_		1	0
Zob Ahan	Pro League	2014–15	18	1	1	0	—		_		19	1
Zob Ahan	Pro League	2015–16	29	4	3	0	8	3	_		40	7
Zob Ahan	Pro League	2016–17	30	3	5	2	6	0	_		41	5
Zob Ahan	Pro League	2017–18	12	0	1	0	0	0	_		13	0
Tractor (loan)	Pro League	2017–18	12	6	1	0	4	0	_		17	6
Tractor (loan)	Pro League	2018–19	16	0	0	0	—		_		16	0
Zob Ahan	Pro League	2019–20	19	1	2	0	2	0	_		23	1
Zob Ahan	Total		157	17	13	2	20	3	_		190	22
Persepolis	Pro League	2020–21	30	0	2	0	13	1	1	0	46	1
Persepolis	Pro League	2021–22	21	0	3	1	1	0	0	0	25	1
Persepolis	Total		51	0	5	1	14	1	1	0	71	2
Foolad	PGL	2022-23	25	0	1	0	0	0	0	0	26	0
Sepahan	PGL	2023-24	6	0	0	0	3	0	0	0	9	0
Foolad	PGL	2023-24	6	0	0	0	0	0	0	0	6	0
Career Total			245	17	19	3	37	4	1	0	302	24

- Assist Goals

Season	Team	Assists
2012–13	Zob Ahan	0
2013–14	Zob Ahan	0
2014–15	Zob Ahan	2
2015–16	Zob Ahan	4
2016–17	Zob Ahan	5
2017–18	Zob Ahan	0
2017–18	Tractor	1
2018–19	Tractor	3
2019–20	Zob Ahan	1
2020–21	Persepolis	1

== International career ==
=== U20 ===
He is part of Iran U–20 during 2012 AFC U-19 Championship qualification, 2012 CIS Cup, 2012 AFF U-19 Youth Championship and 2012 AFC U-19 Championship.

=== U23 ===
He invited to Iran U-23 training camp by Nelo Vingada to preparation for Incheon 2014 and 2016 AFC U-22 Championship (Summer Olympic qualification). He named in Iran U23 final list for Incheon 2014.

=== Senior ===
Pahlavan was called up to the senior Iran squad by Carlos Queiroz for friendlies against Macedonia and Kyrgyzstan in June 2016. He made his debut against Montenegro on 4 June 2017.

== Honours ==
=== Club ===
Zob Ahan

- Hazfi Cup (2): 2014–15, 2015–16
- Iranian Super Cup (1): 2016

Persepolis

- Persian Gulf Pro League (1): 2020–21
- Iranian Super Cup (1): 2020; Runner-up (1): 2021
- AFC Champions League Runner-up (1): 2020

=== Individual ===
Awards

- Fans' Asian Champions League XI: 2016
