= Rahim Zahivi =

Iranian footballer (born 1987 or 1989)

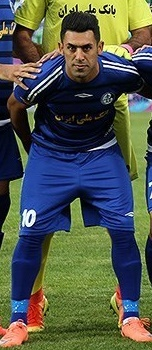
- Zahivi playing for Esteghlal Khuzestan

Personal information
- Full name: Rahim Mehdi Zahivi
- Date of birth: 19 August 1987 or 1989 (age 37–39)
- Place of birth: Ahvaz, Iran
- Height: 1.78 m (5 ft 10 in)
- Position: Forward

Team information
- Current team: Esteghlal Khuzestan
- Number: 50

Senior career*
Years	Team	Apps	(Gls)
2009–2011	Naft Masjed Soleyman		
2011–2012	Shahrdari Bandar Abbas		
2012–2013	Naft Tehran	25	(0)
2013–2015	Sanat Naft Abadan	39	(12)
2015–2017	Esteghlal Khuzestan	42	(13)
2017	Al-Shahania	8	(3)
2017–2018	Foolad	26	(7)
2018	Saipa	4	(0)
2018–2019	Zob Ahan	4	(1)
2020–2021	Mes Rafsanjan	9	(0)
2021	Sanat Naft Abadan	4	(0)
2022	Esteghlal Khuzestan		
- * Club domestic league appearances and goals as of 1 July 2021

Rahim Mehdi Zahivi (Persian: رحیم مهدی‌زهیوی, born 19 August 1987 (Note: His official Persian Gulf Pro League web page lists birth date as 1366/05/28. In the Iranian modern calendar or Solar Hijri calendar, that is 1366 Mordād 28, which converts to 1987 August 19.) or 1989), also known as Rahim Zahivi (Persian: رحیم ‌زهیوی), is an Iranian professional footballer who currently plays as a forward for Esteghlal Khuzestan after the Persian Gulf pro league.

This football player is from Iran. He has played for the national team of Yasuj Municipality, Masjed Soleiman Oil, Bandar Abbas Municipality, Tehran Oil, Abadan Oil Industry, Esteghlal Khuzestan, Al-Shahaniyeh Qatar, Khuzestan Steel and Saipa Tehran and Rafsanjan Copper.

== Club career ==
Zahivi started his career with Shahrdari Yasuj. Later he joined Naft MIS & Shahrdari Bandar Abbas. In winter 2012 he joined Naft Tehran and made 25 appearances without netting in 1.5 season. In summer 2013 he joined Sanat Naft. After shining with Abadani side in Division 1 while he scored 9 times in 20 games.

=== Esteghlal Khuzestan ===
In summer of 2015 Zahivi joined Esteghlal Khuzestan in Persian Gulf Pro League. He was one of the best players in the league for the 2015–16 season and helped Esteghlal Khuzestan win the Persian Gulf Pro League for the first time in club history. Zahivi was named in the Persian Gulf Pro League team of the season for the 2015–16 season.

Joined back from 2 March 2022 till now.

=== Al-Shahania ===
In January 2017, after rumors that he would sign with Esteghlal, Zahivi decided to leave Iran and sign with Qatar Stars League club Al-Shahania. He assisted in his first match with the club.

== International career ==
Zahivi was called up to the senior Iran squad by Carlos Queiroz for friendlies against Macedonia and Kyrgyzstan in June 2016. However, he was injured in training and could not make his national team debut.

== Career statistics ==
As of 25 December 2017.

Club	Division	Season	League		Hazfi Cup		Asia		Total	
Club	Division	Season	Apps	Goals	Apps	Goals	Apps	Goals	Apps	Goals
Naft Tehran	Persian Gulf Cup	2011–12	4	0	0	0	–	–	4	0
Naft Tehran	Persian Gulf Cup	2012–13	21	0	1	0	–	–	22	0
Sanat Naft	Azadegan League	2013–14	19	3	4	0	–	–	23	3
Sanat Naft	Azadegan League	2014–15	20	9	0	0	–	–	11	0
Esteghlal Khuzestan	Persian Gulf Pro League	2015–16	28	7	2	0	–	–	28	7
Esteghlal Khuzestan	Persian Gulf Pro League	2016–17	14	6	1	0	0	0	14	6
Al-shahania	Qatar Stars League	2017	8	0	0	0	0	0	8	3
Foolad	Persian Gulf Pro League	201718	14	3	0	0	0	0	14	3
Career Totals			120	28	8	0	0	0	133	31

== Honours ==
Esteghlal Khuzestan

- Persian Gulf Pro League: 2015–16
- Iranian Super Cup runner-up: 2016

Individual

- Persian Gulf Pro League Team of the Year: 2015–16
