= Ghadir Stadium =

Multi-use stadium in Ahvaz, Iran

- The Red Arena
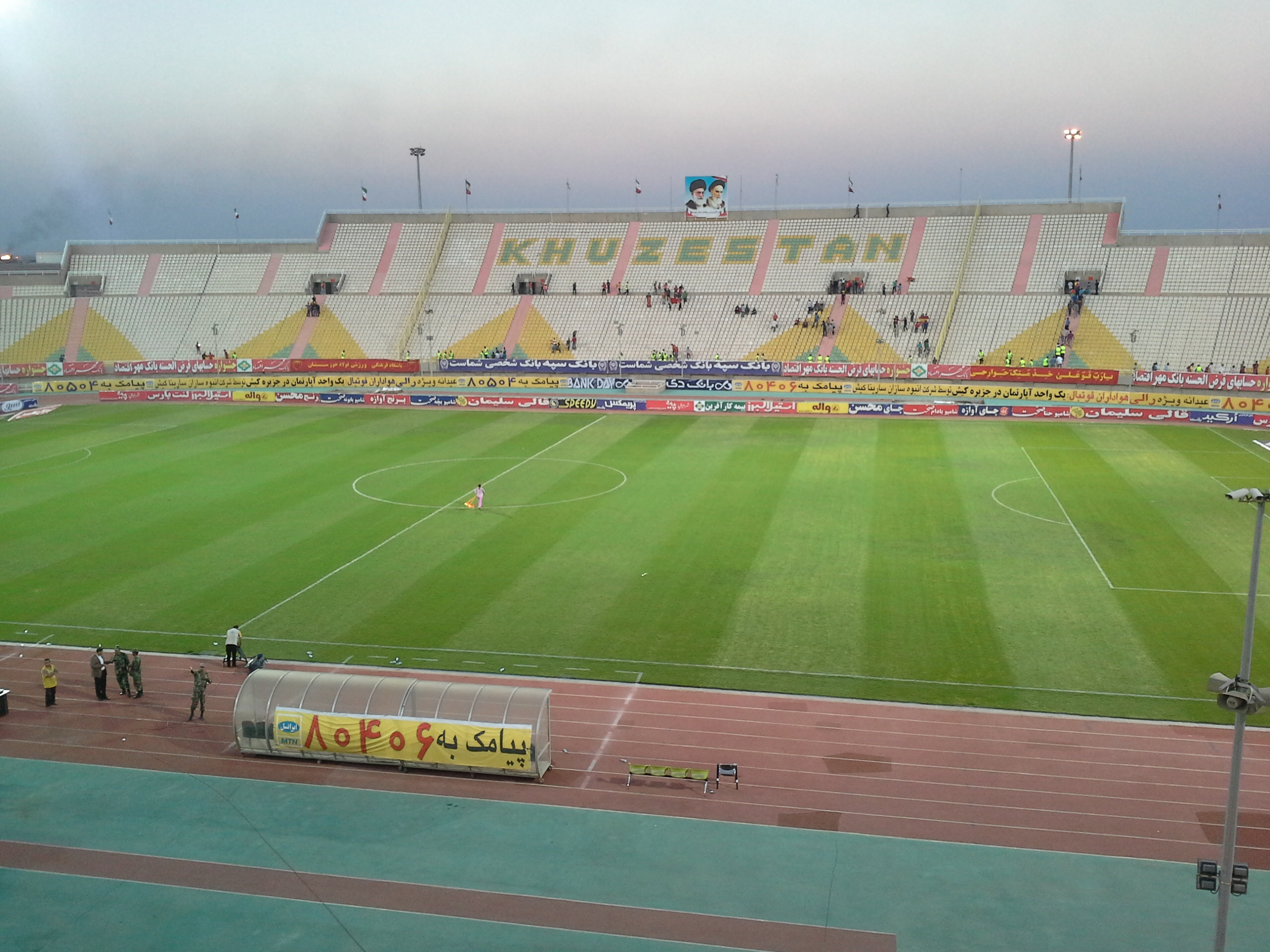
- Interactive map of Ghadir Stadium
- Full name: Ahvaz Ghadir Stadium
- Location: Ahvaz, Iran
- Coordinates: 31°23′03″N 48°38′09″E
- Owner: Ministry of Sport and Youth (Iran)
- Capacity: 38,900 seated
- Surface: Grass
- Scoreboard: 104 m^{2} Jumbotron
- Field size: 105 x 75 m

Construction
- Groundbreaking: 2 February 2006
- Built: 2006–2012
- Opened: 15 March 2012
- Architect: Zohre Farshid

Tenants
- Esteghlal Khuzestan (2012–present); Foolad (2013–2018)

The Ahvaz Ghadir Stadium (Persian: ورزشگاه غدیر اهواز) is a multi-use stadium in Ahvaz, Iran, it has a capacity of 38,900 people.

== Background ==
In 1974, Zohreh Malileh Farshid, one of Iran's first and youngest female architects designed the Ahvaz Sports Complex. Her wish was to have it ready for Ahvaz to host the 1984 Summer Olympics.

The building progress of the complex was ready to start in November 1978 but after the victory of Iranian Revolution in 1979 and start of the Iran–Iraq War in 1981, the building progress was cancelled. After the end of the war in 1989, Ahvaz's then mayor, Mohammad Hossein Adeli was announced that the building of the complex will be started in February 1992. The building of futsall and volleyball venues was started in 1992 and the venues was opened in 1998. Basketball and handball venues was opened in 2002.

The progress of the building of football venue was started on 2 February 2006 after an official visit of President Mahmoud Ahmadinejad. The stadium itself was completed in early 2012 after 6 years of construction. Although the stadium was planned with a capacity of 51,000 seats, the final capacity is only 38,900.

== Opening match ==
The stadium was opened during a match between Iran national under-20 football team and Foolad reserves team on 15 March 2012 which Iran U-20 won the match 4-2. The stadium was set to host the final match of 2011–12 Hazfi Cup but it was transferred to the Hafezieh Stadium in Shiraz.

== See also ==
- Foolad Arena
- Takhti Stadium
- Foolad
- Football in Iran
- List of association football stadia by capacity
