= Mohammad Amin Bahrami =

Iranian footballer (born 1998)

Personal information
- Date of birth: 31 January 1998 (age 28)
- Place of birth: Esfahan, Iran
- Height: 1.92 m (6 ft 4 in)
- Position: Goalkeeper

Youth career
- 2012–2016: Zob Ahan

Senior career*
Years	Team	Apps	(Gls)
2016–2018	Tractor	0	(0)
2019	Foolad	0	(0)
2020–2021	Vista Turbine	1	(0)
2022	Payam Toos		
- * Club domestic league appearances and goals

Mohammad Amin Bahrami or Mohammad-Amin Bahrami (Persian: محمدامین بهرامی; born 31 January 1997) is an Iranian former football goalkeeper. He started with Zob Ahan when he was youth U-19.
