= Iranian Super Cup =

Iran Super Cup
- Organiser(s): Iran Football League Organization
- Founded: 2005
- Region: Iran
- Teams: 2
- Current champions: Tractor (1st title)
- Most championships: Persepolis (5th title)
- Broadcaster(s): IRIB TV3; IRIB Varzesh
- Website: www.persianleague.com
- 2025 Iranian Super Cup

The Iranian Super Cup (Persian: سوپر جام ایران, Super Jam-e 'Iran) is an Iranian association football trophy awarded to the winner of a match between the Persian Gulf Pro League's season champion and the winner of the Hazfi Cup. It is similar to numerous other Super Cup tournaments held in other countries.

The tournament was only held once in 2005 when Hazfi Cup champions Saba Battery defeated league champions Foolad 4–0.

The next edition of the Iranian Super Cup was planned to be played on 10 August 2007 between the 2006–07 league champions Saipa and the Hazfi Cup winners Sepahan but the match was cancelled. After Mehdi Taj was elected as Federation president in 2016, the Iranian Super Cup was restarted. Zob Ahan won the first Super Cup after its restart, beating 2015–16 Persian Gulf Pro League winners Esteghlal Khuzestan 4–2 after extra time.

== Alternative names ==
The Iranian Super Cup has been referred to by various official, common, alternative, and abbreviated names.

=== Official and common names ===
- Iranian Super Cup
- Iran Super Cup
- Iran's Super Cup
- Iran Football Super Cup
- Iranian Football Super Cup
- Super Cup of Iran
- Iran National Super Cup
- Iranian National Super Cup

=== Abbreviations and short names ===
- ISC – Iranian Super Cup
- ISCup – Iranian Super Cup
- Iran SC – Iran Super Cup
- Super Cup
- Iran Supercup
- Iranian Supercup

=== Alternative names ===
- Persian Gulf Super Cup
- Persian Gulf Pro League Super Cup
- Iran Football League Super Cup
- Iranian League Super Cup
- Persian Super Cup
- Iranian Champions Cup
- Iran Champions Cup
- Iran Super Champions Cup

=== Alternative search names ===
- Super Cup Iran
- Iranian Super Cup Football
- Iran Super Cup Football
- Iran Domestic Super Cup
- Iranian Domestic Super Cup
- Iran Football Champions Super Cup
- Persian Gulf Champions Cup

=== Historical context ===
The Iranian Super Cup was established in 2005. After its inaugural edition, the competition was suspended for several years and was revived in 2016. It is contested between the champions of the Persian Gulf Pro League and the Hazfi Cup.

== Participating clubs ==
In the normal circumstances, following clubs participate:

- Defending Persian Gulf Pro League Champions
- Defending Hazfi Cup winners

If a team also be the Persian Gulf Pro League and Hazfi Cup champion, they will become the Super Cup champion.

== Competition format ==
- One 90-minute game
- If tied, extra time and then penalties decide the winner.

== Winners ==
=== Key ===
Persian Gulf Pro League champions
Hazfi Cup winners
Winners of both Persian Gulf Pro League and Hazfi Cup

=== Finals ===
Year	Winner	Score	Runner-up	Venue	Attendance
2005	Saba Battery	4–0	Foolad	Shahid Dastgerdi Stadium, Tehran	2,000
2008	Esteghlal/Pirozi This match didn’t take place.				
2016	Zob Ahan	4–2	Esteghlal Khuzestan	Fuladshahr Stadium, Fuladshahr	2,500
2017	Persepolis	3–0	Naft Tehran	Azadi Stadium, Tehran	40,000
2018	Persepolis	3–0 (Note: Awarded after Esteghlal refused to participate.)	Esteghlal	Azadi Stadium, Tehran	–
2019	Persepolis	Awarded automatically to Persepolis after they won the Double.			
2020	Persepolis	1–0	Tractor	Azadi Stadium, Tehran	0
2021	Foolad	1–0	Persepolis	Shahid Qasem Soleimani Stadium, Sirjan	0
2022	Esteghlal	1–0	Nassaji	Shahid Bahonar Stadium, Kerman	0
2023	Persepolis	Awarded automatically to Persepolis after they won the Double.			
2024	Sepahan	1–0	Persepolis	Imam Khomeini Stadium, Arak	8,800
2025	Tractor	2–1	Esteghlal	Naghsh-e Jahan Stadium, Isfahan	35,000

== Performances ==
Titles won by club (%)
1. Persepolis – 5 (45.5%)
2. Saba – 1 (9.09%)
3. Zob Ahan – 1 (9.09%)
4. Foolad – 1 (9.09%)
5. Esteghlal – 1 (9.09%)
6. Tractor – 1 (9.09%)
7. Sepahan – 1 (9.09%)

Club	Winners	Runners-up	Years won	Years runners-up
Persepolis	5	2	2017, 2018, 2019, 2020, 2023	2021, 2024
Esteghlal	1	2	2022	2018, 2025
Foolad	1	1	2021	2005
Tractor	1	1	2025	2020
Saba	1	0	2005	—
Zob Ahan	1	0	2016	—
Sepahan	1	0	2024	—
Esteghlal Khuzestan	0	1	—	2016
Naft Tehran	0	1	—	2017
Nassaji	0	1	—	2022

=== Performance by representative ===
Competition	Winners
Persian Gulf Pro League winners	5
Hazfi Cup winners	4
Winners of both Persian Gulf Pro League and Hazfi Cup	2

== All-time top goalscorers ==
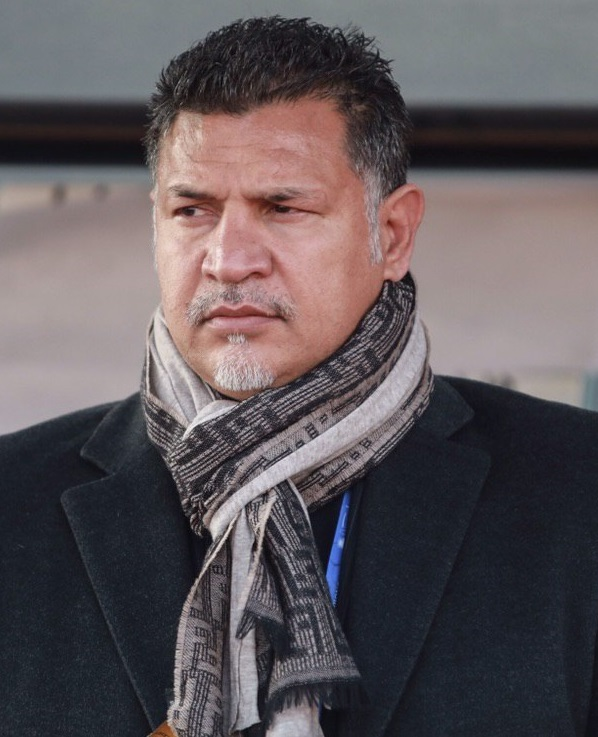
Ali Daei scored 2 goals in super cup for Saba Battery.

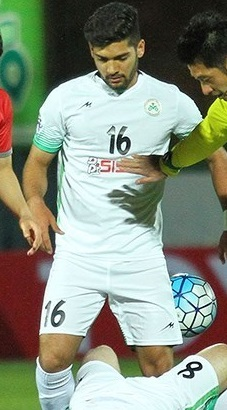
Mehdi Mehdipour scored 2 goals in super cup for Zob Ahan.

As of end of 2025 Iranian Super Cup

Bold indicates active players in Iranian football.

Player	Club(s)	Goals	Ref.
(Iran) Ali Daei	Saba Battery	2	
(Iran) **Mehdi Mehdipour**	Zob Ahan	2	
(Iran) Robert Markosi	Saba Battery	1	
(Iran) Mohsen Soltani	Saba Battery	1	
(Iran) **Morteza Tabrizi**	Zob Ahan	1	
(Iran) **Yaser Feyzi**	Zob Ahan	1	
(Iran) Meysam Doraghi	Esteghlal Khuzestan	1	
(Iran) Rahim Zahivi	Esteghlal Khuzestan	1	
(Iran) **Ali Alipoor**	Persepolis	1	
(Iran) Mohsen Mosalman	Persepolis	1	
(Iran) **Farshad Ahmadzadeh**	Persepolis	1	
(Iran) **Issa Alekasir**	Persepolis	1	
(Mali) Moussa Coulibaly	Foolad	1	
(Iran) **Arsalan Motahari**	Esteghlal	1	
(France) **Steven Nzonzi**	Sepahan	1	
(Iran) **Rouzbeh Cheshmi**	Esteghlal	1	
(Iran) **Amirhossein Hosseinzadeh**	Tractor	1	
(Croatia) **Tomislav Štrkalj**	Tractor	1	
