= 2015–16 Esteghlal F.C. season =

Esteghlal F.C.
2015–16 season
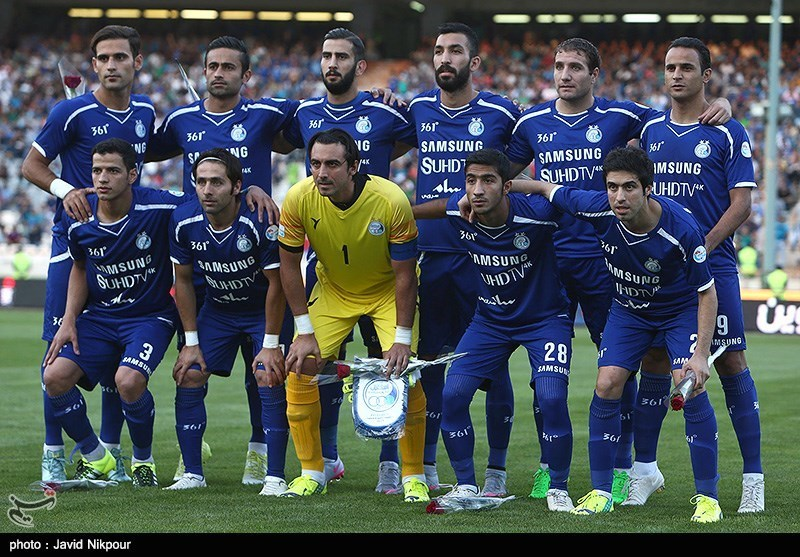
- President: Reza Eftekhari
- Head coach: Parviz Mazloumi
- Stadium: Azadi Stadium
- Persian Gulf League: 3rd
- Hazfi Cup: Runner-up
- Top goalscorer: League: Omid Ebrahimi (10 goals); All: Shahbazzadeh; Omid Ebrahimi (11 goals each)
- Highest home attendance: 90,000 v Persepolis (30 October 2015)
- Lowest home attendance: 2,500 v Est. Khuzestan (21 October 2015)
- Average home league attendance: 30,200
Home colours	Away colours

The 2015–16 season was the Esteghlal Football Club's 15th season in the Persian Gulf Pro League, their 22nd consecutive season in the top division of Iranian football, and 70th year in existence as a football club. They also competed in the Hazfi Cup.

== Club ==
=== Current Management Team ===
Position	Name
Head coach	(Iran) Parviz Mazloumi
Assistant coach	(Iran) Majid Saleh
Assistant coach	(Iran) Sirous Dinmohammadi
Goalkeeper coach	(Iran) Hossein Torabpour
Fitness coach	(Iran) Ali Asghar Ghorbanali Pour
Doctor	(Iran) Kaveh Sotoudeh
Physiotherapist	(Iran) Amin Noroozi
Analyzer	(Iran) Mohammad Navazi
Analyzer	(Iran) Farzad Majidi
Analyzer	(Iran) Mahdi Arjangi Nia
Team Manager	(Iran) Mansour Pourheidari

=== Other information ===
Chairman	Bahram Afsharzadeh
Deputy Chairman	Ali Nazari Juybari
Media Officer	
Director of Football	
Ground (capacity and dimensions)	Azadi Stadium (100,000 / 110x75m)
Training ground	Nasser Hejazi Camp

== Kit ==
Supplier: 361 Degrees (China) / Sponsor: RIRA, Samsung, 3090, Kerman Motor Company

Home	Away

== First team squad ==
Last updated: 29 May 2016

No.	Name	Nationality	Position(s)	Since	Date of Birth (Age)	Signed from	Ends	Games	Goals
Goalkeepers
1	Mehdi Rahmati	(Iran)	GK	2015	28 June 1983 (aged 32)	(Iran) Paykan	2019	189	0
22	Vahid Talebloo	(Iran)	GK	2014	26 May 1982 (aged 33)	(Iran) Rah Ahan	2017	196	0
33	Amir Hossein Najafi	(Iran)	GK	2015	14 October 1996 (aged 19)	Youth system	2017	0	0
Defenders
2	Khosro Heydari	(Iran)	RB, RM	2011	14 September 1983 (aged 32)	(Iran) Sepahan	2017	229	7
5	Hanif Omranzadeh	(Iran)	CB	2009	30 April 1985 (aged 30)	(Iran) Pas	2016	216	24
15	Hrayr Mkoyan	(Armenia)	CB, RB	2014	2 September 1986 (aged 29)	(Armenia) FC Shirak	2016	54	0
20	Meysam Majidi	(Iran)	LB, LM	2015	25 October 1986 (aged 29)	(Iran) Esteghlal Khuzestan	2017	29	3
24	Omid Noorafkan	(Iran)	LB, DM	2015	9 April 1997 (aged 18)	Youth system	2017	10	0
34	Milad Fakhreddini	(Iran)	RB, RM, RW	2014	26 May 1990 (aged 25)	(Iran) Tractor Sazi	2016	55	3
55	Mohammad Amin Hajmohammadi	(Iran)	CB	2015	14 February 1991 (aged 24)	(Iran) Naft Tehran	2017	18	1
Midfielders
3	Mohammad Reza Khorsandnia	(Iran)	DM, CB	2014	5 February 1988 (aged 27)	(Iran) Padideh	2017	43	1
4	Roozbeh Cheshmi	(Iran)	DM, CB	2015	24 July 1993 (aged 22)	(Iran) Saba Qom	2017	26	0
6	Omid Ebrahimi	(Iran)	DM, CM	2014	16 September 1987 (aged 28)	(Iran) Sepahan	2016	63	20
8	Yaghoub Karimi	(Iran)	LM, LB, AM	2014	31 August 1991 (aged 24)	(Iran) Sepahan	2017	40	1
11	Jaber Ansari	(Iran)	RM, LM, AM, RW, LW, SS	2015	10 January 1987 (aged 28)	(Iran) Gostaresh Foulad	2017	33	8
16	Mehdi Momeni	(Iran)	AM, SS	2016	21 September 1985 (aged 30)	(Iran) Naft Tehran	2017	8	0
17	Milad Shabanloo	(Iran)	AM, CM	2014	2 January 1995 (aged 20)	(Iran) Esteghlal Bushehr	2017	3	0
19	Alireza Ramezani	(Iran)	RM, RW	2014	3 June 1993 (aged 22)	(Iran) Naft Gachsaran	2018	19	1
28	Mohsen Karimi	(Iran)	LM, LW	2014	20 September 1994 (aged 21)	Youth system	2018	30	5
36	Mehdi Rajabifar	(Iran)	LM, RM	2015	19 November 1997 (aged 18)	Youth system	2017	0	0
88	Farshid Esmaeili	(Iran)	AM, SS	2015	23 February 1994 (aged 21)	(Iran) Fajr Sepasi	2018	20	1
99	Adil Chihi	(Morocco)	RM, RW	2016	21 February 1988 (aged 27)	Free agent	2016	6	0
Forwards
9	Arash Borhani	(Iran)	CF, RW, LW	2007	14 September 1983 (aged 32)	(Iran) PAS Tehran	2016	292	108
10	Sajjad Shahbazzadeh	(Iran)	CF, SS	2014	23 January 1990 (aged 25)	(Iran) Saipa	2017	62	24
14	Pero Pejić	(Croatia)	CF	2015	28 November 1982 (aged 33)	(Albania) FK Kukësi	2017	17	5
77	Behnam Barzay	(Iran)	LW, RW, LM, RM	2015	11 February 1993 (aged 22)	(Iran) Rah Ahan	2017	24	2
Players transferred during the season
13	Karrar Jassim	(Iraq)	AM, LM, RM, SS	2014	11 June 1987 (aged 28)	(Iraq) Al-Talaba	2016	41	6
18	Rivaldo Barbosa de Souza	(Brazil)	DM, LB	2015	25 August 1985 (aged 30)	(Brazil) Figueirense	2016	3	0
21	Majid Hosseini	(Iran)	CB, RB	2014	20 June 1996 (aged 19)	Youth system	2017	4	0

=== Persian Gulf Pro League squad ===
Note: Flags indicate national team as defined under FIFA eligibility rules; some limited exceptions apply. Players may hold more than one non-FIFA nationality.

No.	Pos.	Nation	Player
1	GK	IRN	Mehdi Rahmati (captain)
2	DF	IRN	Khosro Heydari (4th captain)
3	MF	IRN	Mohammad Reza Khorsandnia
4	MF	IRN	Roozbeh Cheshmi ^{U23}
5	DF	IRN	Hanif Omranzadeh
6	MF	IRN	Omid Ebrahimi
8	MF	IRN	Yaghoub Karimi
9	FW	IRN	Arash Borhani (3rd captain)
10	FW	IRN	Sajjad Shahbazzadeh
11	MF	IRN	Jaber Ansari
14	FW	CRO	Pero Pejić
15	DF	ARM	Hrayr Mkoyan
16	MF	IRN	Mehdi Momeni
17	MF	IRN	Milad Shabanloo ^{U21}

No.	Pos.	Nation	Player
19	MF	IRN	Alireza Ramezani ^{U23}
20	DF	IRN	Meysam Majidi
22	GK	IRN	Vahid Talebloo (2nd captain)
24	MF	IRN	Omid Noorafkan ^{U19}
27	MF	IRN	Hossein Hosseini ^{U21}
28	MF	IRN	Mohsen Karimi ^{U23}
33	GK	IRN	Amir Hossein Najafi ^{U21}
34	DF	IRN	Milad Fakhreddini
36	MF	IRN	Mehdi Rajabifar ^{U19}
55	DF	IRN	Amin Hajmohammadi
77	FW	IRN	Behnam Barzay ^{U23}
88	MF	IRN	Farshid Esmaeili ^{U23}
99	MF	MAR	Adil Chihi

- List of Esteghlal squad in Iran league Organization
- [U19 = Under 19 Player | U21 = Under 21 Player | U23 = Under 23 Player]

== New contracts ==
No.	Pos	Name	Age	Contract length	Ends	Date	Source
2	RB	(Iran) Khosro Heydari	31	2 years	2017	4 July 2015	
6	CM	(Iran) Omid Ebrahimi	28	1 year	2016	5 July 2015	
77	LW	(Iran) Behnam Barzay	22	2 years	2017	20 July 2015	
1	GK	(Iran) Mehdi Rahmati	33	3 years	2019	22 February 2016	

== Transfers ==
=== In ===
==== Summer ====
No.	Pos	Nat.	Name	Age	Moving From	Type	Ends	Date	Source
	LM	(Iran)	Amir Hossein Tahuni	22	Nassaji Mazandaran	End of loan	2019	30 June 2015	
	CM	(Iran)	Iman Basafa	23	Esteghlal Khuzestan	End of loan	2017	30 June 2015	
	RM	(Iran)	Jaber Ansari	28	Gostaresh Foulad	Free Transfer	2017	24 June 2015	
	CB	(Iran)	Mohammad Amin Hajmohammadi	24	Naft Tehran	Free Transfer	2017	25 June 2015	
	LB	(Iran)	Meysam Majidi	28	Esteghlal Khuzestan	Transfer	2017	28 June 2015	
	GK	(Iran)	Mehdi Rahmati	32	Paykan	Free Transfer	2016	29 June 2015	
	DM	(Iran)	Roozbeh Cheshmi	21	Saba Qom	Transfer	2017	30 June 2015	
	AM	(Iran)	Farshid Esmaeili	21	Fajr Sepasi	Free Transfer	2018	5 July 2015	
	CM	(Brazil)	Rivaldo Barbosa de Souza	29	(Brazil) Figueirense	Free Transfer	2016	20 July 2015	
	LM	(Iran)	Yaghoub Karimi	23	Sepahan	Transfer	2017	24 July 2015	
	ST	(Croatia)	Pero Pejić	32	(Albania) FK Kukësi	Free Transfer	2017	2 August 2015	

==== Winter ====
No.	Pos	Nat.	Name	Age	Moving From	Type	Ends	Date	Source
	AM	(Iran)	Mehdi Momeni	30	Naft Tehran	Free Transfer	2017	28 December 2015	
	RM	(Morocco)	Adil Chihi	28	(England) Fulham	Free Transfer	2016	27 February 2016	

=== Out ===
==== Summer ====
No.	Pos	Nat.	Name	Age	Moving To	Type	Date	Source
99	CM	(Iran)	Milad Nouri	29	Siah Jamegan	End of contract	22 June 2015	
17	LM	(Iran)	Yaghoub Karimi	23	Sepahan	End of loan	30 June 2015	
34	CM	(Iran)	Iman Basafa	23	Fajr Sepasi	Released	30 June 2015	
80	ST	(Iran)	Reza Enayati	39	Siah Jamegan	Released	29 June 2015	
32	LM	(Iran)	Amir Hossein Tahuni	22	Nassaji Mazandaran	Released	11 July 2015	
1	GK	(Iran)	Mohsen Forouzan	27	Siah Jamegan	Released	22 July 2015	
16	LB	(Iran)	Hashem Beikzadeh	31	Saba Qom	Released	26 July 2015	
4	CB	(Iran)	Amir Hossein Sadeghi	33	Saba Qom	Released	26 July 2015	
21	GK	(Iran)	Farzin Garousian	23	Aluminium Hormozgan	Released	7 August 2015	
29	ST	(Iran)	Milad Soleiman Fallah	28	Paykan	Released	10 August 2015	
27	RB	(Iran)	Mohammad Reza Soleimani	20	Rah Ahan	Released	10 August 2015	

==== Winter ====
No.	Pos	Nat.	Name	Age	Moving To	Type	Date	Source
18	DM	(Brazil)	Rivaldo Barbosa de Souza	30	(Brazil) Clube de Regatas Brasil	Released	27 September 2015	
13	AM	(Iraq)	Karrar Jassim	28	(Iraq) Naft Al-Wasat	Released	29 November 2015	
35	CB	(Iran)	Mehdi Karbalaei	22	Gostaresh Foulad	Released	8 January 2016	

=== Loan out ===
==== Summer ====
No.	Pos	Nat.	Name	Age	Loaned To	Start	End	Source
35	CB	(Iran)	Mehdi Karbalaei	22	Khoneh Be Khoneh	3 August 2015	30 June 2016	
48	LB	(Iran)	Mohammad Khalili	21	Khoneh Be Khoneh	3 August 2015	30 June 2016	

==== Winter ====
No.	Pos	Nat.	Name	Age	Loaned To	Start	End	Source
21	CB	(Iran)	Majid Hosseini	19	Rah Ahan	27 December 2015	30 June 2016	

== Competitions ==
=== Overall ===
Competition	Started round	Current position / round	Final position / round	First match	Last match
Persian Gulf Pro League	—	—	3rd	30 July 2015	13 May 2016
Hazfi Cup	Round of 32	—	Runner-up	11 Sep 2015	29 May 2016
Last updated: 29 May 2016

Source: Competitions
Note: Current Position/Round Only use for team still a part of Competition.

=== Competition record ===
Competition	Record							
Competition	G	W	D	L	GF	GA	GD	Win %
Persian Gulf Pro League	30	13	13	4	43	28	+15	43.33
Hazfi Cup	5	3	2	0	12	4	+8	60.00
Total	35	16	15	4	55	32	+23	45.71
Last updated: 29 May 2016

=== Persian Gulf Pro League ===
==== Standings ====
Pos	Team	Pld	W	D	L	GF	GA	GD	Pts	Qualification or relegation
1	Est. Khuzestan (C)	30	15	12	3	33	14	+19	57	Qualification for the 2017 AFC Champions League group stage
2	Persepolis	30	16	9	5	50	34	+16	57	Qualification for the 2017 AFC Champions League group stage
3	Esteghlal	30	13	13	4	43	28	+15	52	Qualification for the 2017 AFC Champions League qualifying play-offs
4	Tractor Sazi	30	13	12	5	43	27	+16	51	
5	Naft Tehran	30	13	10	7	30	21	+9	49	

Updated to match(es) played on 13 May 2016. Source: IPL Stats
Rules for classification: 1) points; 2) goal difference; 3) number of goals scored.
(C) Champions

==== Results summary ====
Overall								Home						Away					
Pld	W	D	L	GF	GA	GD	Pts	W	D	L	GF	GA	GD	W	D	L	GF	GA	GD
30	13	13	4	43	28	+15	52	6	7	2	22	15	+7	7	6	2	21	13	+8

Last updated: 13 May 2016.
Source: Ipl Stats

==== Results by round ====
Round	1	2	3	4	5	6	7	8	9	10	11	12	13	14	15	16	17	18	19	20	21	22	23	24	25	26	27	28	29	30
Ground	A	H	H	A	H	A	H	A	H	A	H	A	H	A	H	H	A	A	H	A	H	A	H	A	H	A	H	A	H	A
Result	W	W	L	W	W	W	D	D	D	W	D	W	D	D	W	W	D	D	D	L	W	W	D	D	D	L	W	W	L	D
Position	1	1	4	3	2	1	1	1	1	1	1	1	1	2	2	2	1	1	1	2	1	1	1	1	2	3	2	1	3	3

Updated to match(es) played on 13 May 2016. Source: "Ipl".
A = Away; H = Home; W = Win; D = Draw; L = Loss

==== Matches ====
Win Draw Loss Postponed

30 July 2015 1	Siah Jamegan	1–2	Esteghlal	Mashhad
18:00 (DST+03:30)	A. Naghizadeh 63'; M. Jovanović (yellow card) 52'	report	S. Shahbazzadeh 37', 78'; M. Rahmati (yellow card) 51'; A. Borhani (yellow card) 84'	Stadium: Samen; Attendance: 25,000; Referee: Ahmad Salehi

7 August 2015 2	Esteghlal	2–0	Malavan	Tehran
19:30 (DST+03:30)	O. Ebrahimi 29', 38'; A. Hajmohammadi (yellow card) 18'; M. Majidi (yellow card) 20'; O. Ebrahimi (yellow card) 39'; R. Cheshmi (yellow card) 61'	report	H. Mahini (yellow card) 33'; E. Pourghaz (yellow card) 37'; S. Karami (yellow card) 90+1'	Stadium: Azadi Stadium; Attendance: 30,000; Referee: Shahin Haj Babaei

14 August 2015 3	Esteghlal	0–2	Zob Ahan	Tehran
19:20 (DST+03:30)	H. Mkoyan (yellow card) 40'; M. Karimi (yellow card) 88'	report	E. Pahlevan 61'; M. Tabrizi 85'; M. Tabrizi (yellow card) 85'	Stadium: Azadi Stadium; Attendance: 35,000; Referee: Yadollah Jahanbazi

21 August 2015 4	Esteghlal Ahvaz	1–2	Esteghlal	Ahvaz
19:15 (DST+03:30)	T. Reykani 74'; M-E Nazari (yellow card) 60'; M. Hamidi (yellow card) 67'; M-E Nazari (yellow card) 9+1' (yellow-red card)	report	M. Karimi 72'; M. Majidi 90+2'; H. Omranzadeh (yellow card) 36'; M. Majidi (yellow card) 87'	Stadium: Ghadir Stadium; Attendance: 6,000; Referee: MohammadReza Akbarian

21 September 2015 5	Esteghlal	2–1	Naft Tehran	Tehran
18:45 (DST+03:30)	M. Fakhreddini 51'; O. Ebrahimi 56' (pen.); H. Omranzadeh (yellow card) 71'; P. Pejić (yellow card) 86'; S. Shahbazzadeh (yellow card) 90+4'	report	A. Nong 65'; C. Santos (yellow card) 56'; A. Nong (yellow card) 61'	Stadium: Azadi Stadium; Attendance: 14,000; Referee: Yadollah Jahanbazi

15 September 2015 6	Gostaresh	0–2	Esteghlal	Tabriz
17:00 (DST+03:30)		report	S. Shahbazzadeh 25'; M. Karimi 65'; R. Cheshmi (yellow card) 31'; Y. Karimi (yellow card) 42'; M. Rahmati (yellow card) 76'	Stadium: Gostaresh Foulad Stadium; Attendance: 2,000; Referee: Bijan Heidari

25 September 2015 7	Esteghlal	3–3	Rah Ahan	Tehran
18:30 (DST+03:30)	O. Ebrahimi 37' (pen.), 45' (pen.); A. Borhani 53'; H. Omranzadeh (yellow card) 20'; A. Borhani (yellow card) 39'	report	B. Abdi 12'; S. Strandvall 22' (pen.); F. Farji 52'; I. Nenezić (yellow card) 35'; I. Nenezić (red card) 45'	Stadium: Azadi Stadium; Attendance: 11,000; Referee: Hossein Zargar

16 October 2015 8	Padideh	1–1	Esteghlal	Mashhad
15:00 (DST+03:30)	M. Kheiri 3'; A. Jafari (yellow card) 45'; M. Naghizadeh (yellow card) 45+3'; R. Nasehi (yellow card) 81'	report	M. Moradmand 58' (o.g.); M. Fakhreddini (yellow card) 50'	Stadium: Samen Stadium; Attendance: 22,000; Referee: Mehdi Seyyed Ali

21 October 2015 9	Esteghlal	1–1	Esteghlal Khuzestan	Tehran
16:45 (DST+03:30)	P. Pejić 44'; R. Cheshmi (yellow card) 17'	report	A. Kaabi 36'; M. Tayyebi (yellow card) 19'; R. Seifollahi (yellow card) 31'	Stadium: Azadi Stadium; Attendance: 2,500; Referee: Yadollah Jahanbazi

26 October 2015 10	Sepahan	0–3	Esteghlal	Isfahan
15:00 (DST+03:30)	F. Musaev (yellow card) 30'	report	F. Esmaeili 6'; J. Ansari 53'; B. Barzay 77'; O. Ebrahimi (yellow card) 90+3'	Stadium: Foolad Shahr Stadium; Attendance: 8,500; Referee: Shahin Haj Babaei

30 October 2015 11	Esteghlal	1–1	Perspolis	Tehran
15:00 (DST+03:30)	J. Ansari 49'; M. Majidi (yellow card) 42'; S. Shahbazzadeh (yellow card) 60'; A. Hajmohammadi (yellow card) 82'; O. Ebrahimi (yellow card) 90'	report	J. Bengtson 90+5'	Stadium: Azadi Stadium; Attendance: 90,000; Referee: Mohsen Torky

20 November 2015 12	Foolad	0–2	Esteghlal	Ahvaz
16:20 (DST+03:30)	L. Mesarić (yellow card) 82'	report	J. Ansari 56'; P. Pejić 88'; M.R. Khorsandnia (yellow card) 36'; M. Fakhreddini (yellow card) 41'	Stadium: Ghadir Stadium; Attendance: 18,000; Referee: Ahmad Salehi

30 November 2015 13	Esteghlal	1–1	Saipa	Tehran
17:30 (DST+03:30)	J. Ansari 62'; O. Ebrahimi (yellow card) 50'	report	A. Zeinali 82'; M. Ayoubi (yellow card) 36'; A. Zeinali (yellow card) 87'	Stadium: Azadi Stadium; Attendance: 11,000; Referee: Alireza Faghani

13 December 2015 14	Tractor Sazi	0–0	Esteghlal	Tabriz
15:00 (DST+03:30)		report		Stadium: Sahand; Attendance: 7,000; Referee: Mohsen Ghahremani

17 December 2015 15	Esteghlal	1–0	Saba Qom	Tehran
16:20 (DST+03:30)	S. Shahbazzadeh 18'; B. Barzay (red card) 26'; H. Mkoyan (yellow card) 37'; K. Heydari (yellow card) 90+3'	report	F. Bagheri (yellow card) 44'; M. Ousani (yellow card) 77'; F. Bagheri (yellow card) 88' (yellow-red card)	Stadium: Azadi Stadium; Attendance: 6,500; Referee: Ahmad Salehi

28 December 2015 16	Esteghlal	3–1	Siah Jamegan	Tehran
17:30 (DST+03:30)	M. Karimi 35'; S. Shahbazzadeh 41'; A. Borhani 66'; M. Fakhreddini (yellow card) 70'	report	R. Enayati 50'; S. Afrasiabi (yellow card) 49'; R. Enayati (yellow card) 54'; A. Kamdar (yellow card) 72'	Stadium: Azadi Stadium; Attendance: 5,000; Referee: Bijan Heidari

1 January 2016 17	Malavan	2–2	Esteghlal	Anzali
14:30 (DST+03:30)	J. Ansari 8'; M. Karimi 22'; H. Omranzadeh (yellow card) 40'	report	J. Rafkhaei 17', 77' (pen.); J. Rafkhaei (yellow card) 18'; M. Abshak (yellow card) 61'; H. Mahini (yellow card) 74'	Stadium: Takhti Anzali; Attendance: 5,300; Referee: Mohsen Torky

2 February 2016 18	Zob Ahan	0–0	Esteghlal	Isfahan
14:30 (DST+03:30)	H. Beikzadeh (yellow card) 31'	report	A. Hajmohammadi (yellow card) 33'; M. Rahmati (yellow card) 90+3'	Stadium: Foolad Shahr Stadium; Attendance: 6,500; Referee: Shahin Haj Babaei

7 February 2016 19	Esteghlal	1–1	Esteghlal Ahvaz	Tehran
17:00 (DST+03:30)	O. Ebrahimi 28'; M. Momeni (yellow card) 19'	report	H. Khaziravi 58'; M. Sharifi (yellow card) 81'; Luiz Fernando (yellow card) 90+2'	Stadium: Azadi Stadium; Attendance: 12,000; Referee: Mouood Bonyadifar

14 February 2016 20	Naft Tehran	1–0	Esteghlal	Tehran
17:10 (DST+03:30)	H. Omranzadeh 9' (o.g.); V. Hamdinejad (yellow card) 20'; A. Rezavand (yellow card) 29'; I. Mobali (yellow card) 63'; A.A.Motahari (yellow card) 86'	report	M. Fakhreddini (yellow card) 34'; Y. Karimi (yellow card) 78'; M. Fakhreddini (yellow card) 79' (yellow-red card)	Stadium: Takhti Stadium; Attendance: 7,650; Referee: MohammadReza Akbarian

19 February 2016 21	Esteghlal	2–1	Gostaresh	Tehran
15:30 (DST+03:30)	S. Shahbazzadeh 33'; M. Karimi 44'; O. Ebrahimi (yellow card) 40'; M. Rahmati (yellow card) 58'; H. Omranzadeh (yellow card) 74'	report	M. Ebrahimi (penalty missed) 30'; S. Goudarzi 90+3'; M. Hosseini (yellow card) 14'; M. Batista (yellow card) 25'; M. Nosrati (red card) 58'	Stadium: Azadi Stadium; Attendance: 70,000; Referee: Reza Kermanshahi

4 March 2016 22	Rah Ahan	0–1	Esteghlal	Shahr-e Qods
15:30 (DST+03:30)	M. Mohammadi (yellow card) 40'; F. Faraji (yellow card) 82'	report	M.R. Khorsandnia 45'; M. Fakhreddini (yellow card) 65'; A. Hajmohammadi (yellow card) 71'; R. Cheshmi (yellow card) 90+1'	Stadium: Shahr-e Qods Stadium; Attendance: 35,000; Referee: Shahin Haj Babaei

10 March 2016 23	Esteghlal	0–0	Padideh	Tehran
17:30 (DST+03:30)	A. Chihi (yellow card) 67'; S. Shahbazzadeh (yellow card) 68'; M. Rahmati (yellow card) 90+4'; B. Barzay (yellow card) 90+5'	report	M. Khamisi (yellow card) 62'; H. Badamaki (yellow card) 84'; M. Bayat (yellow card) 86'; B. Salari (yellow card) 90+4'	Stadium: Azadi Stadium; Attendance: 28,000; Referee: Ahmad Salehi

3 April 2016 24	Esteghlal Khuzestan	1–1	Esteghlal	Ahvaz
18:55 (DST+03:30)	F. Salarvand 73'; H. Nassari (yellow card) 30'; D. Mahini (yellow card) 55'; M. Coulibaly (yellow card) 88'	report	M. Majidi 31'; K. Heydari (yellow card) 27'; P. Pejić (yellow card) 65'	Stadium: Ghadir Stadium; Attendance: 17,000; Referee: Ashkan Khorshidi

10 April 2016 25	Esteghlal	0–0	Sepahan	Tehran
19:00 (DST+03:30)	F. Esmaeili (yellow card) 70'	report	S. Ghaedifar (yellow card) 32'; M.R. Khalatbari (yellow card) 65'; A. Karami (yellow card) 80'	Stadium: Azadi Stadium; Attendance: 38,000; Referee: Tooraj Haghverdi

15 April 2016 26	Perspolis	4–2	Esteghlal	Tehran
17:00 (DST+03:30)	M. Taremi 5', 35'; M. Taremi (penalty missed) 40'; R. Rezaeian 54'; M. Mosalman 85'; M. Kafshgari (yellow card) 68'; R. Rezaeian (yellow card) 77'; L. Marić (yellow card) 84'; M. Bengar (yellow card) 87'; M. Taremi (yellow card) 90'	report	J. Ansari 55'; O. Ebrahimi 89' (pen.); H. Omranzadeh (yellow card) 37'; Y. Karimi (yellow card) 74'; O. Ebrahimi (yellow card) 90'; M. Majidi (yellow card) 90+4'	Stadium: Azadi Stadium; Attendance: 100,000; Referee: Mohsen Torky

22 April 2016 27	Esteghlal	3–0	Foolad	Tehran
20:15 (DST+03:30)	O. Ebrahimi 8'; B. Barzay 11'; J. Ansari 36'; J. Ansari (yellow card) 63'	report	M. Chago (yellow card) 35'	Stadium: Azadi Stadium; Attendance: 15,000; Referee: Alireza Faghani

28 April 2016 28	Saipa	1–2	Esteghlal	Tehran
18:00 (DST+03:30)	A. Gholizadeh 64'	report	O. Ebrahimi 52' (pen.); P. Pejić 81'; S. Shahbazzadeh (yellow card) 38'; H. Mkoyan (yellow card) 44'	Stadium: Takhti Stadium; Attendance: 9,000; Referee: Ahmad Salehi

8 May 2016 29	Esteghlal	2–3	Tractor Sazi	Tehran
18:00 (DST+03:30)	A. Hajmohammadi 14'; S. Shahbazzadeh 47'; M. Rahmati (yellow card) 9'	report	Augusto 21'; S. Rafiei 42'; A. Nong 79'; F. Hatami (yellow card) 12'; S. Rafiei (yellow card) 79'; S. Rafiei (yellow card) 90+2' (yellow-red card)	Stadium: Azadi Stadium; Attendance: 85,000; Referee: Hossein Zargar

13 May 2016 30	Saba Qom	1–1	Esteghlal	Qom
18:00 (DST+03:30)	M. Ghazi 28'; M. Farahani (yellow card) 31'; A.H. Sadeghi (yellow card) 59'; F. Machado (yellow card) 90'	report	O. Ebrahimi 32' (pen.)	Stadium: Yadegar-e Emam Stadium; Attendance: 4,000; Referee: Bijan Heidari

=== Hazfi Cup ===
Win Draw Loss Postponed

11 September 2015 Roundof 32	Esteghlal	5–0	Shahrdari Semnan	Tehran
18:30 (DST+03:30)	S. Shahbazzadeh 22', 46'; P. Pejić 65', 75'; M.Fakhreddini 80'; A. Ramezani (yellow card) 29'	report	M. Kamranpour (yellow card) 45+3'	Stadium: Takhti Stadium; Attendance: 3,000; Referee: Seyyed Reza Mahdavi

4 November 2015 Round of 16	Esteghlal	3–1	Foolad	Tehran
16:30 (DST+03:30)	M. Majidi 15'; H. Omranzadeh 20'; J. Ansari 77'; H. Omranzadeh (yellow card) 62'; S. Shahbazzadeh (yellow card) 67'; K. Heydari (yellow card) 70'; R. Cheshmi (yellow card) 85'	report	E. Sharifat 3'	Stadium: Azadi Stadium; Attendance: 5,000; Referee: Ashkan Khorshidi

25 November 2015 Quarterfinal	Naft Tehran	1–1 (a.e.t.) (4–5 p)	Esteghlal	Tehran
15:20 (DST+03:30)	S. Lotfi 90+2'; H. Bou Hamdan (yellow card) 23'; V. Amiri (yellow card) 72'; S. Lotfi (yellow card) 90+2'; V. Hamdinejad (yellow card) 104'; P. Sadeghian (yellow card) 117'	report	M. Daneshgar 45+1' (o.g.); Y. Karimi (yellow card) 23'; F. Esmaeili (yellow card) 66'; Y. Karimi (yellow card) 79' (yellow-red card)	Stadium: Takhti Stadium; Attendance: 1,500; Referee: Shahin Haj Babaei
	Penalties
	M. Shiri (penalty scored); M. Daneshgar (penalty scored); A. Bouazar (penalty scored); H. Bou Hamdan (penalty missed); A.A. Motahari (penalty missed); P. Sadeghian (penalty scored); S. Lotfi (penalty missed)		O. Ebrahimi (penalty missed); P. Pejić (penalty scored); M. Majidi (penalty scored); H. Mkoyan (penalty scored); R. Cheshmi (penalty missed); F. Esmaeili (penalty scored); K. Heydari (penalty scored)

22 December 2015 Semifinal	Tractor Sazi	1–2	Esteghlal	Tabriz
14:30 (DST+03:30)	Augusto 49'; S. Khalilzadeh (yellow card) 32'; S. Ashouri (yellow card) 90+3'; S. Khalilzadeh (yellow card) 90+4' (yellow-red card)	report	S. Shahbazzadeh 29', 52'; S. Shahbazzadeh (yellow card) 32'; M. Rahmati (yellow card) 32'; K. Heydari (yellow card) 55'; H. Mkoyan (yellow card) 83'	Stadium: Yadegar-e Emam Stadium; Attendance: 15,000; Referee: Hossein Zargar

29 May 2016 Final	Zob Ahan	1–1 (a.e.t.) (5–4 p)	Esteghlal	Khorramshahr
21:00 (DST+03:30)	D. Esmaeilifar 20'; M.R. Mazaheri (yellow card) 33'; G. Hadadifar (yellow card) 55'; M.R. Hosseini (yellow card) 87'; A. Hamam (yellow card) 99'; W. Ismail (yellow card) 117'	report	O. Ebrahimi 56' (pen.); M. Majidi (yellow card) 30'; A. Ramezani (yellow card) 117'	Stadium: Khorramshahr Stadium; Attendance: 15,000; Referee: Alireza Faghani
	Penalties
	M. Rajabzadeh (penalty scored); M. Mehdipour (penalty scored); M. Hassanzadeh (penalty scored); M.R. Hosseini (penalty scored); H. Mohammadi (penalty scored)		M. Majidi (penalty scored); H. Mkoyan (penalty scored); O. Ebrahimi (penalty scored); A. Ramezani (penalty missed); Y. Karimi (penalty scored)

=== Friendly Matches ===
==== Pre-season ====
Win Draw Loss Postponed

13 July 2015	Esteghlal	3–0	Bahman	Karaj, Iran
18:00 IRDT (UTC+04:30)	Ebrahimi 60' (pen.); Shahbazzadeh 63', 72'	report		Stadium: Kordan Camp; Attendance: 150

16 July 2015	Esteghlal	0–0	Niroo Zamini	Karaj, Iran
18:30 IRDT (UTC+04:30)		report		Stadium: Kordan Camp; Attendance: 400

20 July 2015	Paykan	1–0	Esteghlal	Tehran, Iran
18:00 IRDT (UTC+04:30)	Moghanlou 24'	report		Stadium: Iran Khodro Stadium

23 July 2015	Esteghlal	1–1	Esteghlal Khuzestan	Tehran, Iran
18:00 IRDT (UTC+04:30)	Ansari 37'	report	Zohaivi 42'	Stadium: Azadi Football Training Pitches; Attendance: 300

==== Mid-season ====
31 August 2015	Esteghlal	3–1	Tohid Tehran	Tehran, Iran
17:30 IRDT (UTC+04:30)	M. Hosseini 25'; K. Jassim 35' (pen.); S. Shahbazzadeh 39'	report	M. Ahmadi 30'	Stadium: Azadi Football Training Pitches; Attendance: 300

26 January 2016	Esteghlal	2–2	Padideh	Tehran, Iran
14:30 IRDT (UTC+04:30)	O. Ebrahimi 31' (pen.); P. Pejić 83'	report	M. Abbasian 26'; M. Kheiri 78'	Stadium: Azadi Football Training Pitches

25 February 2016	Esteghlal	0–0	Oxin Alborz	Tehran, Iran
15:00 IRDT (UTC+04:30)		report		Stadium: Azadi Football Training Pitches

25 March 2016	(Sweden) Hammarby	2–1	Esteghlal	Stockholm, Sweden
19:30 IRDT (UTC+04:30)	D. Jajić 63'; I. Lidberg 68'; E. Israelsson (yellow card) 38'; D. Jajić (yellow card) 50'; Alex (yellow card) 90+3'	report	M. Majidi 2' (pen.)	Stadium: Tele2 Arena; Attendance: 7,127

== Statistics ==
=== Appearances and goals ===
				Persian Gulf Pro League						Hazfi Cup						Total					
No	P	N	Name	S	P			GP	M	S	P			GP	M	S	P			GP	M
1	GK	(Iran)	Mehdi Rahmati	26	26	-23	0	-0.88	2340	4	4	-4	0	-0.86	420	30	30	-27	0	-0.88	2760
2	RM	(Iran)	Khosro Heydari	18	18	0	5	0	1511	3	3	0	0	0	292	21	21	0	5	0	1803
3	DM	(Iran)	Khorsandnia	9	14	1	0	0.11	854	2	3	0	0	0	144	11	17	1	0	0.09	998
4	DM	(Iran)	Roozbeh Cheshmi	21	22	0	1	0	1876	4	4	0	0	0	390	25	26	0	1	0	2266
5	CB	(Iran)	Hanif Omranzadeh	19	20	0	0	0	1778	5	5	1	1	0.18	510	24	25	1	1	0.04	2288
6	DM	(Iran)	Omid Ebrahimi	28	28	10	1	0.36	2520	4	4	1	0	0.21	420	32	32	11	1	0.34	2940
8	LM	(Iran)	Yaghoub Karimi	10	13	0	2	0	827	3	3	0	2	0	289	13	16	0	4	0	1116
9	CF	(Iran)	Arash Borhani	11	14	2	2	0.21	838	0	2	0	0	0	29	11	16	2	2	0.21	867
10	CF	(Iran)	Sajjad Shahbazzadeh	25	26	7	5	0.28	2264	3	4	4	0	1.35	266	28	30	11	5	0.39	2530
11	AM	(Iran)	Jaber Ansari	25	28	7	4	0.28	2226	5	5	1	3	0.18	495	30	33	8	7	0.26	2721
13	AM	(Iraq)	Karrar Jassim	2	6	0	0	0	232	0	0	0	0	0	0	2	6	0	0	0	232
14	CF	(Croatia)	Pero Pejić	4	14	3	0	0.59	456	1	3	2	0	1.35	133	5	17	5	0	0.76	589
15	CB	(Armenia)	Hrayr Mkoyan	25	26	0	0	0	2182	4	4	0	0	0	420	29	30	0	0	0	2602
16	AM	(Iran)	Mehdi Momeni	1	8	0	0	0	250	0	0	0	0	0	0	1	8	0	0	0	250
17	CM	(Iran)	Milad Shabanloo	0	3	0	0	0	38	0	0	0	0	0	0	0	3	0	0	0	38
18	CM	(Brazil)	Rivaldo	1	3	0	0	0	81	0	0	0	0	0	0	1	3	0	0	0	81
19	RM	(Iran)	Alireza Ramezani	1	4	0	0	0	76	1	4	0	0	0	125	2	8	0	0	0	201
20	LB	(Iran)	Meysam Majidi	20	24	2	2	0.10	1790	5	5	1	1	0.19	482	25	29	3	3	0.12	2272
22	GK	(Iran)	Vahid Talebloo	4	4	-5	0	-1.25	360	1	1	0	0	0	90	5	5	-5	0	-1.0	450
24	LM	(Iran)	Omid Noorafkan	7	10	0	0	0	640	0	0	0	0	0	0	7	10	0	0	0	640
28	LM	(Iran)	Mohsen Karimi	12	23	5	0	0.41	1110	1	3	0	0	0	146	13	26	5	0	0.36	1256
34	RB	(Iran)	Milad Fakhreddini	23	23	1	1	0.04	2022	3	4	1	1	0.29	315	26	27	2	2	0.08	2337
55	CB	(Iran)	Amin Hajmohammadi	16	17	1	0	0.06	1449	1	1	0	0	0	90	17	18	1	0	0.06	1539
77	LW	(Iran)	Behnam Barzay	8	19	2	2	0.24	743	2	2	0	0	0	138	10	21	2	2	0.20	881
88	AM	(Iran)	Farshid Esmaeili	10	15	1	0	0.11	847	3	5	0	0	0	309	13	20	1	0	0.08	1156
99	RM	(Morocco)	Adil Chihi	4	5	0	0	0	315	0	1	0	0	0	66	4	6	0	0	0	381
Last updated: 29 May 2016

=== Disciplinary record ===
Includes all competitive matches. Players with 1 card or more are included only.

No.	Nat.	Position	Name	Persian Gulf Pro League			Hazfi Cup			Total		
No.	Nat.	Position	Name	Booked	(yellow card) (yellow-red card)	Sent off (straight red)	Booked	(yellow card) (yellow-red card)	Sent off (straight red)	Booked	(yellow card) (yellow-red card)	Sent off (straight red)
1	(Iran)	GK	Mehdi Rahmati	6	0	0	1	0	0	7	0	0
5	(Iran)	DF	Hanif Omranzadeh	6	0	0	1	0	0	7	0	0
6	(Iran)	MF	Omid Ebrahimi	6	0	0	0	0	0	6	0	0
10	(Iran)	FW	Sajjad Shahbazzadeh	4	0	0	2	0	0	6	0	0
34	(Iran)	DF	Milad Fakhreddini	5	1	0	0	0	0	5	1	0
4	(Iran)	MF	Roozbeh Cheshmi	4	0	0	1	0	0	5	0	0
20	(Iran)	DF	Meysam Majidi	4	0	0	1	0	0	5	0	0
8	(Iran)	MF	Yaghoub Karimi	3	0	0	1	1	0	4	1	0
2	(Iran)	DF	Khosro Heydari	2	0	0	2	0	0	4	0	0
15	(Armenia)	DF	Hrayr Mkoyan	3	0	0	1	0	0	4	0	0
55	(Iran)	DF	Amin Hajmohammadi	4	0	0	0	0	0	4	0	0
9	(Iran)	FW	Arash Borhani	2	0	0	0	0	0	2	0	0
14	(Croatia)	FW	Pero Pejić	2	0	0	0	0	0	2	0	0
19	(Iran)	MF	Alireza Ramezani	0	0	0	2	0	0	2	0	0
88	(Iran)	MF	Farshid Esmaeili	1	0	0	1	0	0	2	0	0
77	(Iran)	FW	Behnam Barzay	1	0	1	0	0	0	1	0	1
3	(Iran)	MF	Mohammad Reza Khorsandnia	1	0	0	0	0	0	1	0	0
11	(Iran)	MF	Jaber Ansari	1	0	0	0	0	0	1	0	0
16	(Iran)	MF	Mehdi Momeni	1	0	0	0	0	0	1	0	0
28	(Iran)	MF	Mohsen Karimi	1	0	0	0	0	0	1	0	0
99	(Morocco)	MF	Adil Chihi	1	0	0	0	0	0	1	0	0
TOTALS				58	1	1	13	1	0	71	2	1

|}

Last updated: 29 May 2016
Source: Competitive matches and ipl

=== Top scorers ===
The list is sorted by shirt number when total goals are equal.

Rnk	Pos	No.	Player	Pro League	Hazfi Cup	Total
1	MF	6	(Iran) Omid Ebrahimi	10	1	11
1	FW	10	(Iran) Sajjad Shahbazzadeh	7	4	11
2	MF	11	(Iran) Jaber Ansari	7	1	8
3	FW	14	(Croatia) Pero Pejić	3	2	5
3	MF	28	(Iran) Mohsen Karimi	5	0	5
4	DF	20	(Iran) Meysam Majidi	2	1	3
5	FW	9	(Iran) Arash Borhani	2	0	2
5	DF	34	(Iran) Milad Fakhreddini	1	1	2
5	FW	77	(Iran) Behnam Barzay	2	0	2
6	MF	3	(Iran) Mohammad Reza Khorsandnia	1	0	1
6	DF	5	(Iran) Hanif Omranzadeh	0	1	1
6	DF	55	(Iran) Amin Hajmohammadi	1	0	1
6	MF	88	(Iran) Farshid Esmaeili	1	0	1
Own goals				1	1	2
TOTALS				43	12	55

Last updated: 29 May 2016.
Source: Competitive matches

=== Top Assister ===
The list is sorted by shirt number when total assists are equal.

Rnk	Pos	No.	Player	Pro League	Hazfi Cup	Total
1	MF	11	(Iran) Jaber Ansari	4	3	7
2	DF	2	(Iran) Khosro Heydari	5	0	5
2	FW	10	(Iran) Sajjad Shahbazzadeh	5	0	5
3	MF	8	(Iran) Yaghoub Karimi	2	2	4
4	DF	20	(Iran) Meysam Majidi	2	1	3
5	FW	9	(Iran) Arash Borhani	2	0	2
5	DF	34	(Iran) Milad Fakhreddini	1	1	2
5	FW	77	(Iran) Behnam Barzay	2	0	2
6	MF	4	(Iran) Roozbeh Cheshmi	1	0	1
6	DF	5	(Iran) Hanif Omranzadeh	0	1	1
6	MF	6	(Iran) Omid Ebrahimi	1	0	1
TOTALS				25	8	33

Last updated: 29 May 2016.
Source: Competitive matches

=== Clean sheets ===
The list is sorted by shirt number when total clean sheets are equal.

Rnk	No.	Player	Pro League	Hazfi Cup	Total
1	1	(Iran) Mehdi Rahmati	11	0	11
2	22	(Iran) Vahid Talebloo	0	1	1
3	33	(Iran) Amir Hossein Najafi	0	0	0
TOTALS			11	1	12

Last updated: 29 May 2016.
Source: Competitive matches

=== Goals conceded ===
The list is sorted by shirt number when total 'minutes played' are equal.

Rnk	No.	Player	Pro League	Hazfi Cup	Total	Minutes played
1	1	(Iran) Mehdi Rahmati	23	4	27	2760 min
2	22	(Iran) Vahid Talebloo	5	0	5	450 min
3	33	(Iran) Amir Hossein Najafi	0	0	0	0 min
TOTALS			28	4	32	3210 min

Last updated: 29 May 2016.
Source: Competitive matches

=== Summary ===
	Total			Home			Away		
	Pro League	Hazfi Cup	Total	Pro League	Hazfi Cup	Total	Pro League	Hazfi Cup	Total
Games played	30	5	35	15	2	17	15	3	18
Games won	13	3	16	6	2	8	7	1	8
Games drawn	13	2	15	7	0	7	6	2	8
Games lost	4	0	4	2	0	2	2	0	2
Goals scored	43	12	55	22	8	30	21	4	25
Goals conceded	28	4	32	15	1	16	13	3	16
Goal difference	+15	+8	+23	+7	+7	+14	+8	+1	+9
Clean sheets	11	1	12	5	1	6	6	0	6
Top scorer	–	–	11	(Iran) Sajjad Shahbazzadeh			(Iran) Omid Ebrahimi		
Top assister	4	3	7	(Iran) Jaber Ansari					
Most appearances	(Iran) Jaber Ansari								
Most minutes played	(Iran) Omid Ebrahimi								

Last updated: 29 May 2016.
Source: Competitive matches

== Awards ==
=== Team ===
Award	Date	Source
Top Ten Asian Football Clubs	26 November 2015	AFC Club Ranking (2012–2015)

=== Player ===
No.	Player	Award	Month	Source
1	(Iran) Mehdi Rahmati	Best Iranian Player of the Last Two Months	October, November	
6	(Iran) Omid Ebrahimi	Persian Gulf Pro League Midfielder of the year	July	

== See also ==
- 2015–16 Persian Gulf Pro League
- 2015–16 Hazfi Cup
