= 2016 Hazfi Cup final =

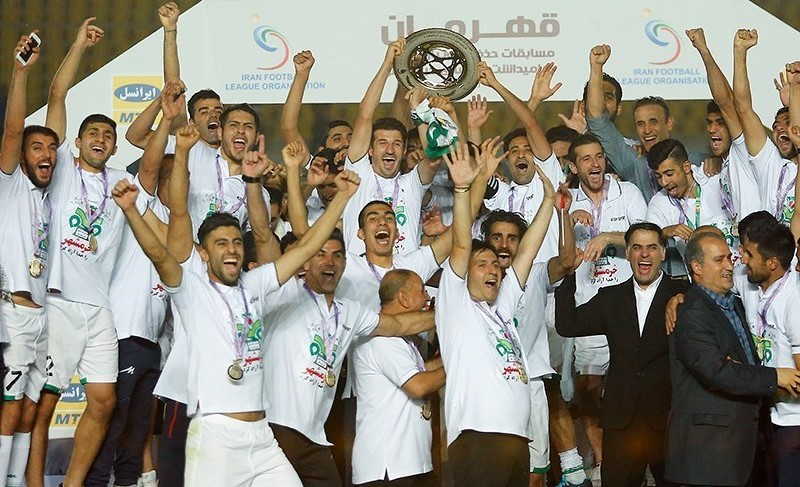
- Event: 2015–16 Hazfi Cup
Zob Ahan	Esteghlal
1	1
- Zob Ahan won 5–4 on penalties
- Date: 29 May 2016
- Venue: Khorramshahr Stadium, Khorramshahr
- Man of the Match: Ghasem Haddadifar
- Fans' Man of the Match: Kaveh Rezaei
- Referee: Alireza Faghani
- Attendance: 15,452
- Weather: Partly Cloudy; 46 °C (115 °F); 21% humidity

The 2016 Hazfi Cup final was the 29th final since 1975. Zob Ahan was the defending champion in the competition and if they won, it would be their first time in the club history to win any competition back-to-back. Zob Ahan had the lead but Esteghlal equalized at the second half. There was nothing to separate the two teams in the extra-time and Esteghlal ultimately lost to Zob Ahan in penalties. Zob Ahan qualified for the group stage of the 2017 AFC Champions League. Esteghlal also went to the play-offs for AFC Champions League because of their third position at the league.

== Format ==
The tie was contested over one legs, simply to last edition. If the teams could still not be separated, then extra time would have been played with a penalty shootout (taking place if the teams were still level after that).

== Pre-match ==
=== Match history ===
This was Zob Ahan's fifth Hazfi final and Esteghlal's ninth appearance in the final match of the tournament. Zob Ahan lastly won the cup in 2002–03, 2008–09 and 2014–15. Their other final appearance was in 2000–01 season where they lost to Fajr Sepasi.

Esteghlal didn't make it to the final of Hazfi Cup for four years, Esteghlal lately won the cup in 1977, 1996, 2000, 2002, 2008, and 2012, Esteghlal was runners-up four times.

== Details ==
29 May 2016
18:30 (UTC+4:30)

Zob Ahan	1 – 1 (a.e.t.)	Esteghlal
Rahmati 20' (o.g.)	Report	Ebrahimi 56' (pen.)
Penalties
(penalty scored) Rajabzadeh; (penalty scored) Mehdipour; (penalty scored) Hassanzadeh; (penalty scored) Hosseini; (penalty scored) Mohammadi	5 – 4	(penalty scored) Majidi; (penalty scored) Mkoyan; (penalty scored) Ebrahimi; (penalty missed) Ramezani; (penalty scored) Karimi

Khorramshahr Stadium, Khorramshahr
Attendance: 15,452
Referee: Alireza Faghani

Zob Ahan	Esteghlal

Zob Ahan: 4-3-3
GK	12	(Iran) Mohammad Rashid Mazaheri
DF	3	(Lebanon) Walid Ismail
DF	33	(Iran) Vahid Mohammadzadeh
DF	4	(Iran) Hadi Mohammadi
DF	18	(Lebanon) Ali Hamam
MF	8	(Iran) Ghasem Hadadifar (c)
MF	11	(Iran) Morteza Tabrizi
MF	16	(Iran) Mehdi Mehdipour
FW	23	(Iran) Danial Esmaeilifar
FW	30	(Iran) Mehdi Rajabzadeh
FW	9	(Iran) Kaveh Rezaei
Manager:
(Iran) Yahya Golmohammadi

Esteghlal: 4-5-1
GK	1	(Iran) Mehdi Rahmati (c)
DF	34	(Iran) Milad Fakhreddini
DF	5	(Iran) Hanif Omranzadeh
DF	15	(Armenia) Hrayr Mkoyan
DF	20	(Iran) Meysam Majidi
MF	3	(Iran) Mohammad Reza Khorsandnia
MF	6	(Iran) Omid Ebrahimi
MF	88	(Iran) Farshid Esmaeili
MF	8	(Iran) Yaghoub Karimi
MF	11	(Iran) Jaber Ansari
FW	77	(Iran) Behnam Barzay
Manager:
(Iran) Parviz Mazloumi

Man of the match

- (Iran) Ghasem Hadadifar (Zob Ahan)

Assistant referees:
Hassan Zaheri
Javad Sharafi
Fourth official:

Match rules:

- 90 minutes
- 30 minutes of extra-time if necessary
- Penalty shoot-out if scores still level
- Seven named substitutes
- Maximum of three substitutions

== See also ==
- 2015–16 Iran Pro League
- 2015–16 Azadegan League
- 2015–16 Iran Football's 2nd Division
- 2015–16 Iran Football's 3rd Division
- 2015–16 Hazfi Cup
- Iranian Super Cup
- 2015–16 Iranian Futsal Super League
- Esteghlal season
- Zob Ahan season
