= Omid Noorafkan =

Iranian footballer (born 1997)

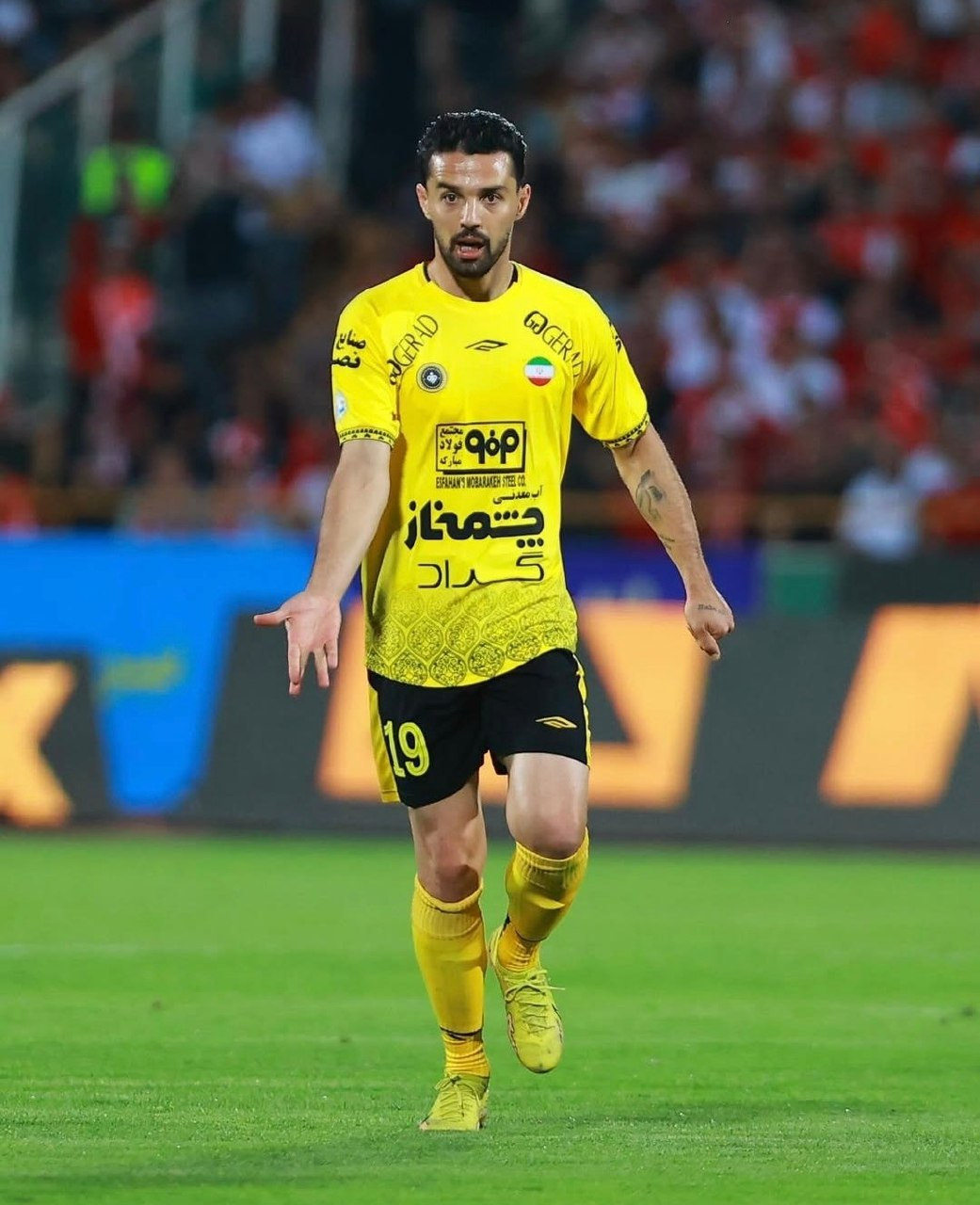
- Noorafkan with Sepahan in 2023

Personal information
- Date of birth: 9 April 1997 (age 29)
- Place of birth: Rey, Iran
- Height: 1.84 m (6 ft 0 in)
- Positions: Defensive midfielder; left-back

Team information
- Current team: Sepahan
- Number: 19

Youth career
- 2005–2007: Erfan Nasim Shahr
- 2008–2012: Ehsan Rey
- 2012–2015: Esteghlal

Senior career*
Years	Team	Apps	(Gls)
2015–2018	Esteghlal	49	(4)
2018–2020	Charleroi	2	(0)
2019	→ Esteghlal (loan)	9	(0)
2019–2020	→ Sepahan (loan)	23	(3)
2020–	Sepahan	156	(18)
2024–2025	→ Malavan (loan)	30	(4)

International career^{‡}
2011–2014	Iran U17	5	(1)
2014–2017	Iran U20	13	(3)
2017–2020	Iran U23	11	(2)
2018–	Iran	45	(1)
Medal record
Representing Iran
CAFA Nations Cup
Winner	2023 Kyrgyzstan – Uzbekistan	Team
Runner-up	2025 Tajikistan–Uzbekistan	Team
- * Club domestic league appearances and goals as of 27 February 2026 ‡ National team caps and goals as of 17 November 2026

Omid Noorafkan (Persian: امید نورافکن; born 9 April 1997) is an Iranian professional footballer who plays as defensive midfielder or left-back for Iranian club Sepahan, and the Iran national team.

Noorafkan started his career with Esteghlal Tehran F.C and at the time became the youngest ever player to play a game for the club at the age of 18 years and eight months and 12 days.

== Club career ==
=== Early career ===
A native of Rey, Iran, Noorafkan started playing football at Ehsan Rey where he played mostly as a striker.

=== Esteghlal ===
Noorafkan joined Esteghlal as a youth player in 2012 at the age of 15 and played for their under-19 team. During his time in Esteghlal's Under-19, his position was shifted from striker to left back.

==== 2015–16 season: Debut season ====
Noorafkan was promoted to the senior squad before the start of the 2015–16. Due to the absence of Yaghoub Karimi and Meysam Majidi, Esteghlal's coach Parviz Mazloumi decided to play Noorafakan as left back in order to fill their place. He made his first senior appearance on 17 December 2015 at the age of 18 years and 271 days in a 1–0 win against Saba Qom making him the youngest ever player to appear in a match for Esteghlal at the time. A record which was broken by Mehdi Ghayedi two seasons later. His impressive performances lead him to become a regular member of the starting eleven during 2015–16 season. He finished the season with 11 appearances playing as a left back.

==== 2016–17 season: First team breakthrough ====
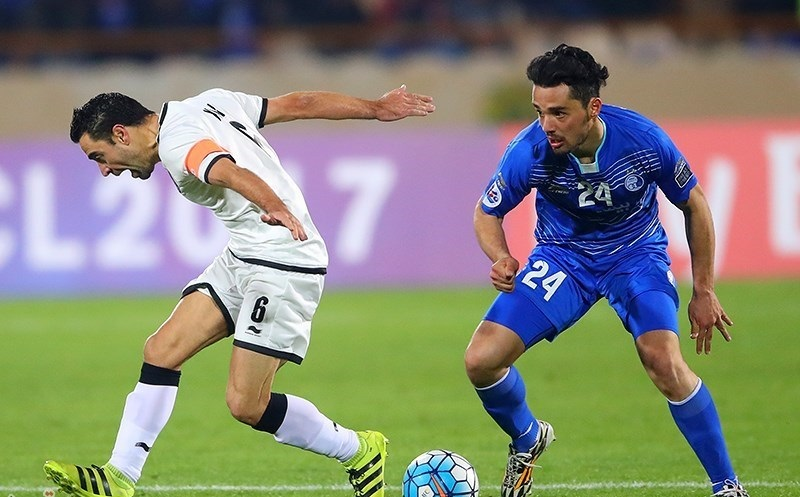
Noorafkan (right) with Xavi in AFC Champions League qualifying play-off match against Al Sadd SC

He was placed in the starting line up for the season opening match against Naft Tehran. However, due to a FIFA imposed transfer ban which lead to Esteghlal's lack of midfield, team manager Alireza Mansourian, tried Noorafkan in his favorite position as a defensive midfielder. The position which he played with Iran U19 as well. Following his stunning display in that role, he secured his place in the team's starting line up. On 27 January 2017, he scored his first professional goal in a 3–2 home win against Paykan. He scored another goal in a 3–0 win against Machine Sazi the following week. Earlier in that match he assisted Ali Ghorbani's goal. On 2 February 2017, he started the AFC Champions League qualifying play-off match against Al Sadd SC which Esteghlal won in a 4–3 penalty shoot-out following a 0–0 draw after extra time. On 12 February he played his first Tehran derby against city rivals Persepolis assisting Kaveh Rezaei's goal as Esteghlal won 3–2. Noorafkan was lauded by Iranian media for his display against Persepolis, marking-out creative Attacking midfielder Soroush Rafiei as he played an insignificant role in the match against Esteghlal.

On 4 April he had an argument with his teammate, Yaghoub Karimi after being substituted. Due to his behaviour Alireza Mansourian decided to ban him from group training. He was also excluded from the squad to play against Gostaresh Foulad on 4 April. On 7 April he finally got the permission to join the team training with the rest of the squad. He was included in the called up squad for the AFC Champions League match against Lokomotiv Tashkent but he sat on the bench during the match. He returned to the starting line-up in the match against Saba Qom on 15 April which resulted in a 2–1 win for Esteghlal. On 29 April he scored a stunner from outside of the box with his weaker foot, in Esteghlal's 2–1 win against Padideh. He ended the season with 3 goals in 18 appearances in all competition as Esteghlal finished the season in second place in the league, were eliminated in the quarter-finals of the Hazfi Cup by Naft Tehran and qualified from the group stage of Champions League. He signed a contract extension through 2019 with Esteghlal on 16 June 2017. He was named "Persian Gulf Pro League Young Player of the Year" by F.F.I.R.I. at the end of the season.

==== 2017–18 season ====
At the beginning of the season, Noorafkan was banned from playing by the F.F.I.R.I. along with two other Esteghlal players Majid Hosseini and Mehdi Ghaedi as Alireza Mansourian prevented them from joining the Iran under-23 camp. After missing the first week of the season, the deprivation from the F.F.I.R.I. was finally cancelled on 29 July 2017 and the players were ready to play for the second week of the 2017–18 campaign. He finally made his season debut on 4 August 2017 in a 0–0 draw against Esteghlal Khuzestan. On 8 September 2017, he scored his first goal of the season in a 2–1 win over Gol Gohar in Hazfi Cup.

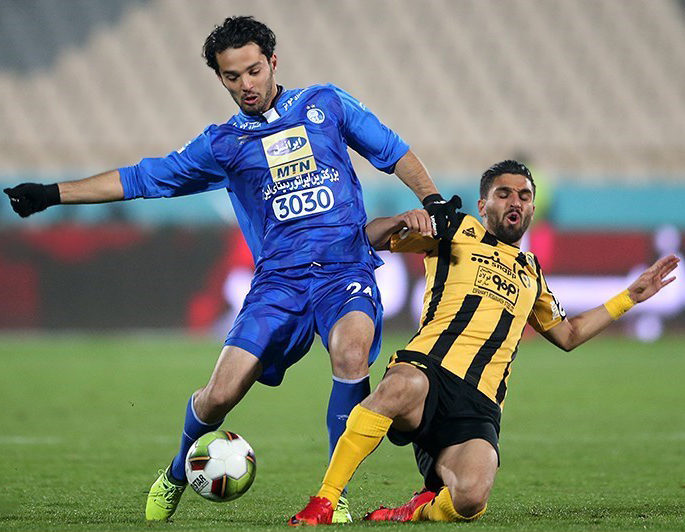
Noorafkan in action against Sepahan in December 2017

On 20 December 2017, he was introduced as one of the "100 Best Young Players to Watch in 2018" by the Outside of the Boot website. His first league goal was the game-winning goal in a 2–1 away victory against Naft Tehran on 29 March. He finished the season with 1 goal in 24 appearances in all competition as Esteghlal finished the season in third in the 2017–18 campaign, won the Hazfi Cup and qualified for the quarter-finals of Champions League.

=== Charleroi ===
On 6 June 2018, Noorafkan signed for Belgian First Division A club Charleroi, for a fee reported to be worth around €250,000. He made his official debut for Charleroi in a 3–2 away win over Genk on 19 August.

==== Return to Esteghlal ====
On 26 January 2019, Esteghlal re-signed Noorafkan on a six-month loan deal. On 7 February, he made his first league appearance, since leaving Esteghlal in a 4–0 win against Paykan.

== International career ==
=== Youth ===
Noorafkan played five matches for Iran under-17 scoring one goal. Later on, he was called up for Iran under-20 and became a regular member. With the Iranian under-20 team he became the vice-captain and took part in the 2016 AFC U-19 Championship, under manager Amir Hossein Peiravani, playing an important role in Iran's tournament run. After beating Uzbekistan in the Quarter-finals, Iran managed to qualify for the 2017 FIFA U-20 World Cup, making their first appearance in World Cup after 16 years having Noorafkan starting every match of the tournament. However Iran was knocked out of the competition after losing 5–6 on penalties to Saudi Arabia in Semi-finals.

As 2017 FIFA U-20 World Cup coincided with Esteghlal's match in Champions League against Al Ain, Esteghlal's coach Alireza Mansourian was against Noorafkan joining the U20 squad to play in the competition. However, later on, the coach changed his mind and decided to let the player join the U20 squad and captain the side. He made his tournament debut against Costa Rica while wearing the captain armband, as Iran beat their opponent 1–0. It was Iran's first win and the goal was Iran's first goal in the competition after 40 years which was scored by Mehdi Mehdikhani. On 24 May, in Iran's second match against Zambia, Noorafkan began the game and managed to be fouled and get a free-kick which was converted by Reza Shekari and get a 2–0 lead. However, Iran couldn't keep the lead as Zambia made a comeback and Iran lost the match 4–2. He also played the full 90 minutes against Portugal which Iran lost 2–1 and was eventually eliminated from the competition.

=== Senior ===
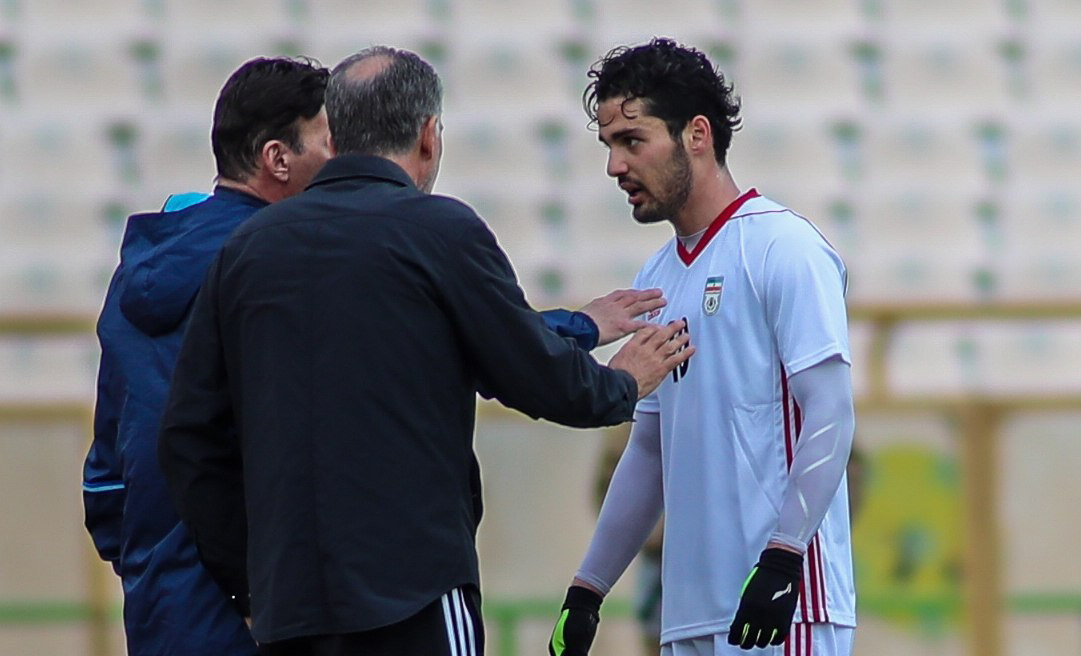
Noorafkan on his debut with Iran national team in 2018.

Noorafkan was called up for the first time for the Iran senior team in August 2017 at the age 20 by coach Carlos Queiroz for Iran's 2018 FIFA World Cup qualifying matches against South Korea and Syria. On 17 March 2018, he made his official debut in a 4–0 victory against Sierra Leone, assisting Mohammad Reza Khanzadeh's goal. In May 2018 he was named in Carlos Queiroz's Preliminary 35-man Iran squad for the 2018 World Cup in Russia. However he did not make the final 23 and was left out of the squad. Noorfakan, along with Kasra Taheri, announced he would not travel with the national team to Mexico to play in the 2026 FIFA World Cup.

== Personal life ==
Noorafkan was raised in Baharestan County in Tehran Province. His parents are from Sarab and he is an Iranian Azeri. He is a fan of Germany national football team and Bayern Munich and he idolises Germany's former captain Philipp Lahm.

== Career statistics ==
=== Club ===
As of 27 February 2026

Appearances and goals by club, season and competition
Club	Season	League			National Cup		Continental^{1}		Total	
Club	Season	League	Apps	Goals	Apps	Goals	Apps	Goals	Apps	Goals
Esteghlal	2015–16	Persian Gulf Pro League	11	0	0	0	—		11	0
Esteghlal	2016–17	Persian Gulf Pro League	14	3	0	0	6	0	20	3
Esteghlal	2017–18	Persian Gulf Pro League	24	1	4	1	6	0	34	2
Esteghlal	Total		49	4	4	1	12	0	65	5
Charleroi	2018–19	Belgian First Division A	2	0	0	0	—		2	0
Esteghlal (loan)	2018–19	Iran Pro League	9	0	0	0	5	0	14	0
Sepahan	2019–20	Iran Pro League	23	3	3	0	6	0	32	3
Sepahan	2020–21	Iran Pro League	30	2	3	0	0	0	33	2
Sepahan	2021–22	Iran Pro League	28	4	1	0	6	0	35	4
Sepahan	2022–23	Iran Pro League	29	7	2	0	0	0	31	7
Sepahan	2023–24	Iran Pro League	16	0	5	1	2	0	23	1
Sepahan	2025–26	Iran Pro League	20	0	2	0	6	0	28	0
Sepahan	Total		146	16	16	1	20	0	182	17
Malavan	2024–25	Persian Gulf Pro League	30	4	4	1	0	0	34	5
Total			236	24	24	3	37	0	297	27

^{1} Includes AFC Champions League matches.

=== International ===
As of 17 November 2026

National team	Year	Apps	Goals
Iran	2018	1	0
Iran	2020	2	0
Iran	2021	5	0
Iran	2022	7	0
Iran	2023	4	0
Iran	2024	10	1
Iran	2025	9	0
Iran	2026	7	0
Total		45	1

=== International goals ===
No.	Date	Venue	Opponent	Score	Result	Competition
1	21 March 2024	Azadi Stadium, Tehran, Iran	Turkmenistan	5–0	5–0	2026 FIFA World Cup qualification

== Honours ==
Esteghlal

- Hazfi Cup: 2017–18

Sepahan

- Hazfi Cup: 2023–24
