= 2016 Shohada Cup =

Tournament details
- Host country: Iran
- Dates: 23 January – 26 January
- Teams: 4 (from 1 confederation)
- Venue(s): 1 (in 1 host cities)

Final positions
- Champions: Saba Qom (1st title)
- Runners-up: Persepolis
- Third place: Saipa
- Fourth place: Zob Ahan

Tournament statistics
- Matches played: 4
- Goals scored: 9 (2.25 per match)
- Top scorer(s): Amir Hossein Sadeghi; Ali Zeynali (2 goals)

The 2016 Shohada Cup was the 2nd edition friendly football tournament; it took place in Shahr-e Qods, Iran in January 2016.

== Participating teams ==
Totally 4 teams get permission to participate in the tournament "2016 Shohada Cup".

- Persepolis from ( Iran)
- Saba Qom from ( Iran)
- Saipa from ( Iran)
- Zob Ahan from ( Iran)

== Matches ==
=== First round ===
23 January 2016
22:15 IRDT (UTC+04:30)

Persepolis	3 – 2	Saipa
Kamyabinia (yellow card) 21'; Rezaeian 30'; Taremi 31'; Umaña (yellow card) 55'; Ahmadzadeh (yellow card) 68'; Bengston 70'	Report	Zeynali 8', 78'

Shohada-ye Shahr-e Qods Stadium, Shahr-e Qods, Iran
Attendance: 9,000
23 January 2016

Saba Qom	2 – 1	Zob Ahan
Sadeghi 62', 75'	Report	Rezaei 1'

Shohada-ye Shahr-e Qods Stadium, Shahr-e Qods, Iran
Attendance: 800

=== Play-off ===
25 January 2016

Saipa	0 – 0 (a.e.t.)	Zob Ahan
	Report
Penalties
Ebrahimzadeh (penalty missed); Moshkelpour (penalty missed); Shakouri (penalty missed); Zeynali (penalty scored); Teymourian (penalty scored); Shahalidoost (penalty scored)	3–2	(penalty missed) Rajabzadeh; (penalty scored) Tabrizi; (penalty missed) Mohebi; (penalty scored) Aurélio; (penalty missed) Mehdipour; (penalty missed) Shekari

Shohada-ye Shahr-e Qods Stadium, Shahr-e Qods, Iran
Attendance: 100
Referee: Saeid Bakhshizadeh

=== Final ===
26 January 2016
22:15 IRDT (UTC+04:30)

Saba Qom	1 – 0	Persepolis
Ghazi 65'	Report	Kamyabinia (yellow card) 59' (yellow-red card) 84'

Shohada-ye Shahr-e Qods Stadium, Shahr-e Qods, Iran
Attendance: 5,000

== Statistics ==
=== Top Scorers ===
Position	Player	Club	Goals
1	(Iran) Ali Zeynali	(Iran) Saipa	2
1	(Iran) Amir Hossein Sadeghi	(Iran) Saba Qom	2
2	(Iran) Ramin Rezaeian	(Iran) Persepolis	1
2	(Iran) Kaveh Rezaei	(Iran) Zob Ahan	1
2	(Honduras) Jerry Bengtson	(Iran) Persepolis	1
2	(Iran) Mohammad Ghazi	(Iran) Saba Qom	1
2	(Iran) Mehdi Taremi	(Iran) Persepolis	1
_	OG		0
_	Penalty Goals		0
_	technical loses of 3–0		0
Total goals (Including technical loses)			9
Total games			4
Average per game			2
