= Hossein Hosseini =

Hossein Hosseini may refer to:

- Hossein Hosseini (footballer, born 1988)
- Hossein Hosseini (footballer, born 1992)
- Hossein Hosseini (footballer, born 1995)

== See also ==
- Hussein al-Husseini (disambiguation)
