= Hussein al-Husseini =

Hussein al-Husseini may refer to:

- Hussein el-Husseini (1937–2023), Lebanese politician
- Hussein al-Husayni (died 1918), Arab mayor of Jerusalem

== See also ==
- Hossein Hosseini (disambiguation)
