= Milad Shabanloo =

Iranian footballer

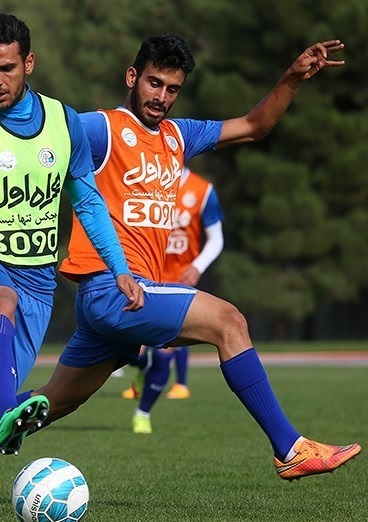
- Shabanloo in 2015

Personal information
- Date of birth: 2 January 1995 (age 31)
- Place of birth: Bushehr, Iran
- Position: Midfielder

Team information
- Current team: Shahin Bushehr

Youth career
- 2014–2016: Esteghlal

Senior career*
Years	Team	Apps	(Gls)
2015–2016	Esteghlal	3	(0)
2016–2017	Sanat Naft Abadan	1	(0)
2017–2018	Iranjavan		
2018–	Shahin Bushehr		

International career^{‡}
2014	Iran U20	1	(0)
- * Club domestic league appearances and goals as of 23 April 2016 ‡ National team caps and goals as of 23 April 2016

Milad Shabanloo (Persian: میلاد شعبانلو; born 2 January 1995) is an Iranian footballer who plays as a midfielder for Shahin Bushehr.

== Club career ==
Shabanloo made his debut for Esteghlal in 27th fixtures of 2015–16 Iran Pro League against Foolad while he substituted in for Farshid Esmaeili.
