= 2012 AFF U-19 Youth Championship =

Athletic competition

Giải vô địch bóng đá U-19 Đông Nam Á 2012

Tournament details
- Host country: Vietnam
- City: Ho Chi Minh City
- Dates: 2–8 September
- Teams: 4 (from 1 confederation)
- Venue: 1 (in 1 host city)

Final positions
- Champions: Iran (1st title)
- Runners-up: Uzbekistan
- Third place: Australia
- Fourth place: Vietnam

Tournament statistics
- Matches played: 8
- Goals scored: 29 (3.63 per match)
- Top scorer(s): (Iran) Alireza Jahanbakhsh (Iran) Sardar Azmoun (4 goals)

The 2012 AFF U-19 Youth Championship was held from 2 to 8 September 2012, hosted by Vietnam. All games were played at the Thong Nhat Stadium in Ho Chi Minh City. Vietnam and Thailand were due to represent the AFF but Thailand withdrew and were replaced by Iran. Australia and Uzbekistan are the other competing nations.

The competition was held as preparation for the 2012 AFC U-19 Championship.

== Standings & Results ==
=== Group stage ===
Team	Pld	W	D	L	GF	GA	GD	Pts
Iran	3	3	0	0	8	3	+5	9
Uzbekistan	3	2	0	1	7	3	+4	6
Australia	3	1	0	2	6	6	0	3
Vietnam	3	0	0	3	1	10	−9	0

2 September 2012
16:00

Australia	1 – 2	Uzbekistan
Antonis 36'	Report	Yusupov 77'; Abdumuminov 90'

Thống Nhất Stadium, Hồ Chí Minh City
Referee: Muhammad Taqi Aljaafari Bin Jahari (Singapore)
2 September 2012
18:30

Iran	2 – 1	Vietnam
Azmoun 1'; Barzay 33'	Report	Phan Dinh Thang 44'

Thống Nhất Stadium, Hồ Chí Minh City
Referee: Mohd Amirul Izwan Bin Yaacob (Malaysia)

4 September 2012
16:00

Uzbekistan	1 – 2	Iran
Sergeev 71'	Report	Azmoun 29'; Cheshmi

Thống Nhất Stadium, Hồ Chí Minh City
Referee: Chanketya Thong (Cambodia)
4 September 2012
18:30

Vietnam	0 – 4	Australia
	Report	Edwards 31'; Barker-Daish 53'; Makarounas 57'; Dao Duy Khanh 84' (o.g.)

Thống Nhất Stadium, Hồ Chí Minh City
Referee: Min Hla (Myanmar)

6 September 2012
16:00

Australia	1 – 4	Iran
Geria 39'	Report	Jahanbakhsh 51', 63' (pen.); Azmoun 52', 85'

Thống Nhất Stadium, Hồ Chí Minh City
Referee: Mohd Amirul Izwan Bin Yaacob (Malaysia)
6 September 2012
18:30

Uzbekistan	4 – 0	Vietnam
Maksimillan 45'; Yusupov 60'; Pham Hoang Lam 79' (o.g.); Abbosbek 86'	Report

Thống Nhất Stadium, Hồ Chí Minh City
Referee: Muhammad Taqi Aljaafari Bin Jahari (Singapore)

=== Third place play-off ===
8 September 2012
16:00

Australia	4 – 0	Vietnam
Geria 12'; Woodcock ?', 73'; Taggart 66'	Report

Thống Nhất Stadium, Hồ Chí Minh City
Referee: Chanketya Thong (Cambodia)

=== Final ===
8 September 2012
18:30

Iran	2 – 1	Uzbekistan
Jahanbakhsh 1', 23'	Report	Sergeev 19'

Thống Nhất Stadium, Hồ Chí Minh City
Referee: Muhammad Taqi Aljaafari Bin Jahari (Singapore)

== Winner ==
2012 AFF U-19 Youth Championship winners

Iran
First title

== Goalscorers ==
4 goals

- (Iran) Sardar Azmoun
- (Iran) Alireza Jahanbakhsh

2 goals

- (Australia) Jason Geria
- (Australia) Riley Woodcock
- (Uzbekistan) Igor Sergeev
- (Uzbekistan) Abdul Aziz Yusupov

1 goal

- (Australia) Terry Antonis
- (Australia) Jake Barker-Daish
- (Australia) Ryan Edwards
- (Australia) Jesse Makarounas
- (Australia) Adam Taggart
- (Iran) Behnam Barzay
- (Iran) Roozbeh Cheshmi
- (Uzbekistan) Jakhongir Abdumuminov
- (Uzbekistan) Makhstaliev Abbosbek
- (Uzbekistan) Fomin Maksimillan
- (Uzbekistan) Abdul Aziz Yusupov
- (Vietnam) Phan Dinh Thang

Own goal

- (Vietnam) Dao Duy Khanh (playing against Australia)
- (Vietnam) Pham Hoang Lam (playing against Uzbekistan)
