= Igor Nenezić =

Slovenian footballer

Personal information
- Full name: Igor Nenezić
- Date of birth: 23 March 1984 (age 42)
- Place of birth: Kranj, SFR Yugoslavia
- Height: 1.87 m (6 ft 2 in)
- Position: Goalkeeper

Team information
- Current team: Dekani
- Number: 22

Youth career
- –2003: Triglav Kranj

Senior career*
| Years | Team | Apps | (Gls) |
| 2003–2005 | Triglav Kranj | 16 | (0) |
| 2005–2009 | Primorje | 83 | (0) |
| 2009–2014 | Koper | 70 | (0) |
| 2014–2016 | Rah Ahan | 30 | (0) |
| 2017–2019 | Koper | 17 | (0) |
| 2019 | Izola | 9 | (0) |
| 2019–2020 | Koper | 19 | (0) |
| 2020 | Dekani | 0 | (0) |
| 2021 | Koper | 0 | (0) |
| 2023– | Dekani | 0 | (0) |

International career
| 2001 | Slovenia U17 | 12 | (0) |
| 2003–2005 | Slovenia U20 | 3 | (0) |
| 2004–2006 | Slovenia U21 | 7 | (0) |

Managerial career
- 2022–: Dekani (goalkeeper coach)
- * Club domestic league appearances and goals as of 19 August 2019

Igor Nenezić (born 23 March 1984) is a Slovenian professional footballer who plays as a goalkeeper, and works as a goalkeeper coach, for NK Dekani.

== Club career ==
Nenezić was born in Kranj and played football with NK Triglav Kranj before starting his professional career with NK Primorje. After spending five years with Triglav Kranj and five years with Primorje, Nenezić transferred to FC Koper. Nenezić moved abroad for the first time in his career in 2014 to play for Iranian club Rah Ahan.

On 11 January 2017, he returned to FC Koper.

== International career ==
Nenezić played for youth selections of Slovenian national football team, and was also called up several times for the senior team by Matjaž Kek, during Slovenia's EURO 2008 qualifying campaign as a replacement goalkeeper, but failed to make an appearance.

== Coaching and later career ==
In the summer 2022, Nenezić was appointed goalkeeper coach of NK Dekani. In February 2023, 38-year old Nenezić was registered as a player for the team, beside his coaching duties. Among other things, he sat on the bench in a match against NK Rogaška on 15 April 2023.

== Honours ==
=== Club ===
Koper

- Slovenian First League: 2009–10
- Slovenian Supercup: 2010
