= Phạm Hoàng Lâm =

Vietnamese footballer

Personal information
- Full name: Phạm Hoàng Lâm
- Date of birth: March 6, 1993 (age 33)
- Place of birth: Ho Chi Minh City, Vietnam
- Height: 1.87 m (6 ft 2 in)
- Position: Centre-back

Youth career
- 2006–2013: Đồng Tâm Long An

Senior career*
Years	Team	Apps	(Gls)
2013–2018	Đồng Tâm Long An	58	(0)
2018–2019	Hoàng Anh Gia Lai	6	(0)
2020	Hồng Lĩnh Hà Tĩnh	15	(0)
2021–2022	Hồ Chí Minh City	5	(0)
2023	Quảng Nam	5	(0)
2023	Đồng Tháp	6	(0)
2025–2026	Bắc Ninh	16	(0)

International career
2012–2013	Vietnam U19	16	(0)
2014–2016	Vietnam U23	9	(0)
- * Club domestic league appearances and goals as of 19 February 2017

Phạm Hoàng Lâm (born 6 March 1993) is a Vietnamese professional footballer who last played as a centre-back for V.League 2 club Bắc Ninh.

== Honours ==
Quảng Nam

- V.League 2: 2023
