= Mohammad Amin Hajmohammadi =

Iranian footballer

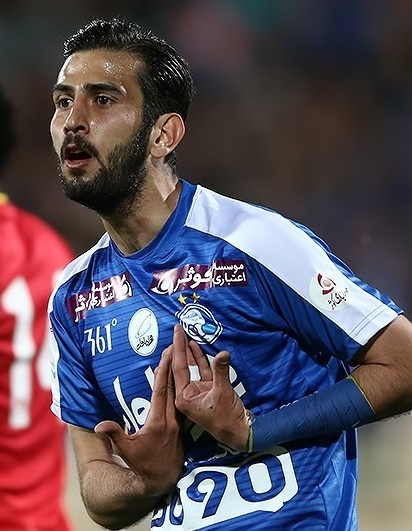

Personal information
- Date of birth: 14 February 1991 (age 35)
- Place of birth: Tehran, Iran
- Height: 1.84 m (6 ft 0 in)
- Position: Defender

Youth career
- 2005–2010: Saipa
- 2010–2011: Naft Tehran

Senior career*
| Years | Team | Apps | (Gls) |
| 2008–2010 | Saipa | 0 | (0) |
| 2010–2015 | Naft Tehran | 56 | (2) |
| 2011–2013 | → Malavan (loan) | 4 | (0) |
| 2015–2017 | Esteghlal | 17 | (1) |
| 2017 | Machine Sazi | 11 | (0) |
| 2017–2018 | Gostaresh Foulad | 4 | (0) |
| 2018 | Khooneh be Khooneh | 14 | (1) |
| 2018–2019 | Saipa | 8 | (0) |

International career
| 2009–2010 | Iran U20 | | |
| 2012–2014 | Iran U23 | 10 | (1) |

Managerial career
- 2024: Yazdanmehr Moeini
- 2024: Mehr Khalij Fars
- * Club domestic league appearances and goals

Mohammad Amin Hajmohammadi (Persian: محمد امین حاج محمدی; born 14 February 1991) is an Iranian football coach and a former player.

== Club career ==
Hajmohammadi started his career with Saipa. In the summer of 2011 he joined Malavan.

In the 2012–13 season he only appeared in four games for Naft, three times playing the whole length of the match and once being substituted in.

On June 25, 2015, he joined Esteghlal on a two-year contract.

=== Club career statistics ===
As of 26 July 2015

| Club | Division | Season | League | | Hazfi Cup | | Asia | | Total | |
| Club | Division | Season | Apps | Goals | Apps | Goals | Apps | Goals | Apps | Goals |
|---|---|---|---|---|---|---|---|---|---|---|
| Saipa | Pro League | 2008–09 | 1 | 0 | 0 | 0 | – | – | 1 | 0 |
| Saipa | Pro League | 2009–10 | 0 | 0 | 1 | 0 | – | – | 1 | 0 |
| Naft Tehran | Pro League | 2010–11 | 7 | 0 | 1 | 0 | – | – | 8 | 0 |
| Malavan | Pro League | 2011–12 | 3 | 0 | 1 | 0 | – | – | 4 | 0 |
| Malavan | Pro League | 2012–13 | 1 | 0 | 0 | 0 | – | – | 1 | 0 |
| Naft Tehran | Pro League | 2012–13 | 3 | 0 | 0 | 0 | – | – | 4 | 0 |
| Naft Tehran | Pro League | 2013–14 | 25 | 2 | 2 | 1 | – | – | 27 | 3 |
| Naft Tehran | Pro League | 2014–15 | 22 | 1 | 5 | 0 | 7 | 0 | 34 | 0 |
| Career total | | | 62 | 2 | 10 | 1 | 0 | 0 | 80 | 3 |

== International ==
=== Under 22 ===
He was invited to Iran U-22 by Alireza Mansourian to competing in 2013 AFC U-22 Asian Cup qualification.
