= Mohammad-Esmail Nazari =

Iranian football player (born 1987)

Personal information
- Full name: Mohammad-Esmail Nazari
- Date of birth: September 20, 1987 (age 39)
- Place of birth: Tehran, Iran
- Height: 1.83 m (6 ft 0 in)
- Position: Defensive midfielder

Youth career
- –2006: Pas

Senior career*
Years	Team	Apps	(Gls)
2006–2007	Pas	13	(0)
2007–2009	PAS Hamedan	21	(0)
2009–2012	Steel Azin	17	(0)
2012–2015	Parseh	48	(5)
2015	Esteghlal Ahvaz	14	(0)
2016	TOT		
2016–2017	Al-Nasr		
2017–2018	Padideh	8	(0)
2018–2019	Shahin Bushehr	3	(0)

International career
2007	Iran U23		
- * Club domestic league appearances and goals as of 11 June 2019

Mohammad-Esmail Nazari (Persian: محمداسماعیل نظری, born September 20, 1987) is an Iranian football player.

== Club career ==
A product of the PAS Tehran's youth system, Esmail Nazari was drafted into the first team for the IPL 2006/07 season. At the end of the season as PAS F.C. officially dissolved, he moved to PAS Hamedan along with other team members.

=== Club Career Statistics ===
Last Update 11 June 2019

Club performance			League		Cup		Continental		Total	
Season	Club	League	Apps	Goals	Apps	Goals	Apps	Goals	Apps	Goals
Iran			League		Hazfi Cup		Asia		Total	
2006–07	Pas Tehran	Persian Gulf Cup	13	0			-	-		
2007–08	Pas Hamedan	Persian Gulf Cup	11	0	3	0	-	-	14	0
2008–09	Pas Hamedan	Persian Gulf Cup	10	0			-	-		
2009–10	Steel Azin	Persian Gulf Cup	8	0			-	-		
2010–11	Steel Azin	Persian Gulf Cup	9	0	2	0	-	-	11	0
Career total			51	0			0	0		

- Assist Goals

Season	Team	Assists
10–11	Steel Azin	0

== International career ==
Mohammad Esmail Nazar was a member of Iran national under-23 football team, competing in the qualification games for the 2008 Summer Olympics.
