= Alireza Ramezani (footballer, born 1993) =

Iranian footballer

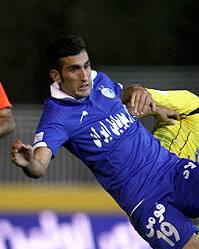

Personal information
- Full name: Alireza Ramezani
- Date of birth: 3 June 1993 (age 33)
- Place of birth: Abhar, Iran
- Height: 1.71 m (5 ft 7 in)
- Positions: Attacking midfielder; second striker

Team information
- Current team: Niroo Zamini
- Number: 7

Youth career
- 2011–2013: Moghavemat Tehran
- 2013–2014: Naft Gachsaran
- 2014: Esteghlal

Senior career*
Years	Team	Apps	(Gls)
2013–2014	Naft Gachsaran	3	(0)
2014–2016	Esteghlal	14	(0)
2016–2017	Tractor Sazi	2	(0)
2017	→ Saba Qom (loan)	2	(0)
2017–	Niroo Zamini	0	(0)

International career^{‡}
2011–2013	Iran U20	13	(2)
2013–2015	Iran U22	2	(0)
- * Club domestic league appearances and goals as of 25 June 2016 (UTC) ‡ National team caps and goals as of 5 September 2013 (UTC)

Alireza Ramezani (Persian: علیرضا رمضانی, born 3 June 1993) is an Iranian football midfielder, who currently plays for an Iranian club, Niroo Zamini.

== Club career ==
=== Moghavemat Tehran ===
He joined Moghavemat Tehran in the summer of 2011. He played for the Moghavemat youth team for three seasons.

=== Naft Gachsaran ===
In winter 2013, Ramezani joined Naft Gachsaran. He played his first match for Naft Gachsaran in the 2013–14 season.

=== Esteghlal ===
He played half seasons for Naft Gachsaran and moved to Esteghlal in the summer of 2014. He officially joined Esteghlal on 29 June 2014 with a three-year contract. He made his debut for his new team in a 1–0 win over Esteghlal Khuzestan, coming as a substitute for Arash Borhani in the 68th minute, during which he assisted Sajjad Shahbazzadeh to score the winning goal.

=== Club Career Statistics ===
- Last Update: 25 June 2016

Club performance			League		Cup		Continental		Total	
Season	Club	League	Apps	Goals	Apps	Goals	Apps	Goals	Apps	Goals
Iran			League		Hazfi Cup		Asia		Total	
2014–15	Esteghlal	Iran Pro League	10	0	1	1	–	–	11	1
2015–16	Esteghlal	Iran Pro League	10	0	4	0	–	–	14	0
Career total			20	0	5	1	0	0	25	1

- Assists

Season	Team	Assists
14–15	Esteghlal	1

== International career ==
=== U20 ===
He played thirteen matches from 2011 to 2013 for Iran national under-20 football team.

=== U22 ===
After Incheon 2014 Games he invited to Iran U-22 training camp by Nelo Vingada.
