= Ali Zeinali =

Iranian footballer

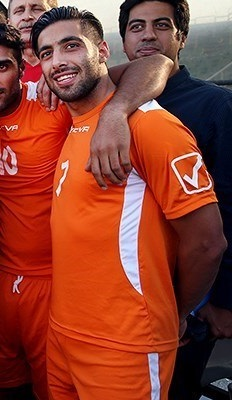

Personal information
- Full name: Ali Zeinali
- Date of birth: April 11, 1990 (age 36)
- Place of birth: Pakdasht, Tehran, Iran
- Height: 1.79 m (5 ft 10 in)
- Positions: Winger; attacking midfielder

Team information
- Current team: Oxin Alborz
- Number: 17

Youth career
- –2010: Saipa

Senior career*
Years	Team	Apps	(Gls)
2010–2017	Saipa	150	(12)
2017–2018	Naft Talaieh	6	(0)
2018–	Oxin Alborz	0	(0)

International career^{‡}
2010	Iran U23	1	(0)
- * Club domestic league appearances and goals as of 6 March 2017 (UTC) ‡ National team caps and goals as of 15 November 2010

Ali Zeinali is an Iranian footballer who plays for Oxin Alborz in the Azadegan League.

== Club career ==
Zeinali has played his entire career for Saipa F.C.

Club performance			League		Cup		Continental		Total	
Season	Club	League	Apps	Goals	Apps	Goals	Apps	Goals	Apps	Goals
Iran			League		Hazfi Cup		Asia		Total	
2009–10	Saipa	Pro League	17	0	0	0	–	–	17	0
2010–11	Saipa	Pro League	12	0	0	0	–	–	12	0
2011–12	Saipa	Pro League	10	0	1	0	–	–	11	0
2012–13	Saipa	Pro League	15	1	0	0	–	–	15	0
2013–14	Saipa	Pro League	26	1	1	0	–	–	27	1
2014–15	Saipa	Pro League	21	4	0	0	–	–	21	4
2015–16	Saipa	Pro League	26	4	0	0	–	–	26	4
Career total			127	10	2	0	0	0	129	10

- Assists

Season	Team	Assists
10–11	Saipa	1
11–12	Saipa	0
12–13	Saipa	0
13–14	Saipa	1
14–15	Saipa	0

== International ==
In 2010, Zeinali was selected to participate in Iran U-23 football team's training camp in Poland.
