= Walid Ismail =

Lebanese footballer (born 1984)

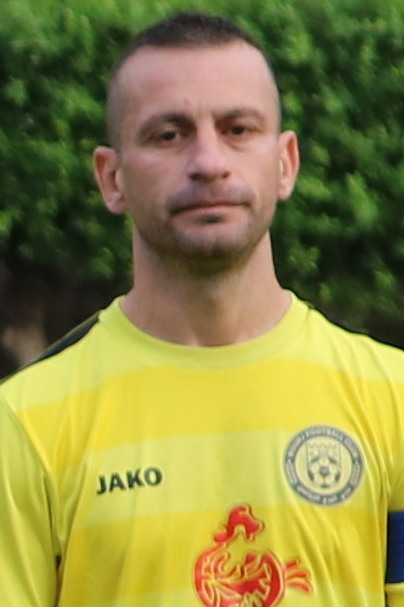
- Ismail with Bourj in 2020

Personal information
- Full name: Walid Bahij Ismail
- Date of birth: 10 November 1984 (age 42)
- Place of birth: Beirut, Lebanon
- Height: 1.70 m (5 ft 7 in)
- Position: Left-back

Senior career*
Years	Team	Apps	(Gls)
–2008	Islah Borj Shmali		
2008–2013	Racing Beirut		
2013–2014	Nejmeh	29	(0)
2014–2016	Zob Ahan	23	(0)
2016–2018	Safa	35	(0)
2018–2019	Salam Zgharta	10	(0)
2019–2021	Bourj	17	(0)
2021–2022	Sagesse	20	(0)
Total		134+	(0+)

International career
2010–2019	Lebanon	69	(1)
- * Club domestic league appearances and goals

Walid Bahij Ismail (Arabic: وليد بهيج إسماعيل; born 10 November 1984) is a Lebanese former professional footballer who played as a left-back.

Ismail began his career in Lebanon at Islah Borj Shmali, before playing for Racing Beirut and then Nejmeh, with whom he won the 2013–14 league title. In 2014 he moved to Zob Ahan in Iran, winning two consecutive Hazfi Cup titles—in 2014–15 and 2015–16. Ismail returned to Lebanon in 2016, playing for Safa, Salam Zgharta, Bourj and Sagesse.

He is one of his country's most capped players, having represented Lebanon internationally 69 times between 2010 and 2019. Ismail participated at the 2011, 2015, and 2019 AFC Asian Cup qualifications, and the 2014 and 2018 FIFA World Cup qualifications. He also played at the 2019 AFC Asian Cup, in Lebanon's first participation through qualification.

== Club career ==
Starting his career at Islah Borj Shmali in the Lebanese Second Division, Ismail played for Lebanese Premier League side Racing Beirut, before moving to Nejmeh in 2013 where he won one league title, one Super Cup, one Elite Cup and helped them reach the round of 16 of the 2013 AFC Cup. In 2014, he moved to Iranian club Zob Ahan with whom he won two Hazfi Cups and played in the AFC Champions League.

In 2016 he returned to Lebanon at Safa, where he spent two seasons, before joining Salam Zgharta in 2018. On 3 June 2019, Ismail joined newly promoted side Bourj. Ismail moved to newly promoted side Sagesse on 12 June 2021, on a one-year deal. He left the club on 13 July 2022.

== International career ==
Ismail represented Lebanon at the 2019 AFC Asian Cup. On 21 January 2019, Ismail announced his retirement from international football.

== Playing style ==
While not a fast left-back, Ismail is known for his calmness and experience on the field.

== Career statistics ==
=== International ===
Scores and results list Lebanon's goal tally first, score column indicates score after each Ismail goal.

List of international goals scored by Walid Ismail
No.	Date	Venue	Opponent	Score	Result	Competition	Ref.
1	19 December 2012	Saida Municipal Stadium, Sidon, Lebanon	Pakistan	1–0	3–1	Friendly	

== Honours ==
Nejmeh

- Lebanese Premier League: 2013–14

Zob Ahan

- Hazfi Cup: 2014–15, 2015–16

Individual

- Lebanese Premier League Team of the Season: 2012–13, 2013–14

== See also ==
- List of Lebanon international footballers
