= Mohammad Reza Khorsandnia =

Iranian footballer

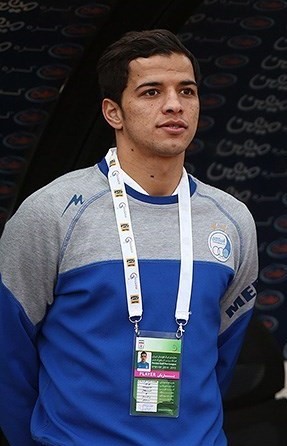

Personal information
- Full name: Mohammad Reza Khorsandnia
- Date of birth: 5 February 1988 (age 38)
- Place of birth: Mashhad, Iran
- Height: 1.74 m (5 ft 9 in)
- Position: Midfielder

Team information
- Current team: Nassaji

Youth career
- 2002–2004: Aboumoslem

Senior career*
Years	Team	Apps	(Gls)
2005–2011	Aboumoslem	40	(2)
2011–2012	Paykan	11	(0)
2012–2013	Gahar	29	(2)
2013–2014	Padideh	23	(2)
2014–2016	Esteghlal	38	(1)
2016–2017	Padideh	10	(0)
2017	Gostaresh Foolad	8	(0)
2017–2018	Siah Jamegan	8	(0)
- * Club domestic league appearances and goals as of 8 August 2014

Mohammad Reza Khorsandnia is an Iranian professional footballer. He played for Aboumoslem in the Iran Pro League.

== Career ==
Khorsandnia started his career at Aboumoslem in 2005. After the club's relegation to the Azadegan League, Khorsandnia transferred to Paykan. In 2012, Khorsandnia was acquired by the newly promoted team Gahar Zagros He signed with Esteghlal in the summer of 2014.

Club performance			League		Cup		Continental		Total	
Season	Club	League	Apps	Goals	Apps	Goals	Apps	Goals	Apps	Goals
Iran			League		Hazfi Cup		Asia		Total	
2005–06	Aboumoslem	Pro League	1	0	^{1}	^{1}	-	-	1^{1}	0^{1}
2006–07	Aboumoslem	Pro League	2	0	^{1}	^{1}	-	-	2^{1}	0^{1}
2007–08	Aboumoslem	Pro League	0	0	^{1}	^{1}	-	-	0^{1}	0^{1}
2008–09	Aboumoslem	Pro League	0	0	^{1}	^{1}	-	-	0^{1}	0^{1}
2009–10	Aboumoslem	Pro League	18	1	^{1}	^{1}	-	-	18^{1}	1^{1}
2010–11	Aboumoslem	Division 1	19	1	^{1}	^{1}	-	-	19^{1}	1^{1}
2011–12	Paykan	Division 1	11	0	^{1}	^{1}	-	-	11^{1}	0^{1}
2012–13	Gahar Zagros	Pro League	29	2	^{1}	0	-	-	29^{1}	2
2013–14	Padideh Shandiz	Division 1	23	2	^{1}	0	-	-	23^{1}	2
2014–15	Esteghlal	Pro League	24	0	3	0	-	-	27	0
Career total			127	6	3^{1}	0^{1}	-	-	130^{1}	6^{1}

^{1} Statistics Incomplete.

== External sources ==
- Profile at Persianleague
- Mohammad Reza Khorsandnia at Soccerway (archived)
