= Hossein Hosseini (footballer, born 1995) =

Iranian footballer

Personal information
- Full name: Seyed Hossein Hosseini
- Date of birth: 19 January 1995 (age 31)
- Place of birth: Savaj Bolagh, Iran
- Height: 1.76 m (5 ft 9 1/2 in)
- Position: Midfielder

Team information
- Current team: Naft Tehran
- Number: 27

Youth career
- 2015–2017: Esteghlal

Senior career*
Years	Team	Apps	(Gls)
2015–2016	Esteghlal	0	(0)
2017–2018	Naft Tehran	6	(0)
2018-2021	Vahdat Aghasht	1	(0)
2021-2022	Ario Eslamshahr	0	(0)
- * Club domestic league appearances and goals as of 1 June 2025

Hossein Hosseini (Persian: حسین حسینی, born 19 January 1995, in Savojbolagh, Iran) is an Iranian football midfielder who played for Naft Tehran in the Persian Gulf Pro League from 27 July 2017 to 1 July 2018. He then played for Vahdat Aghasht and Ario Eslamshahr. He is now without a club. He had a total of two yellow cards in his career.

== Club career ==
=== Club career statistics ===
As of 1 June 2025

Club performance			League		Cup		Continental		Total	
Club	League	Season	Apps	Goals	Apps	Goals	Apps	Goals	Apps	Goals
Iran			League		Hazfi Cup		Asia		Total	
Naft Tehran	Pro League	2017–18	7	0	0	0	0	0	7	0
Career Total			7	0	0	0	0	0	7	0
