= Farshid Esmaeili =

Iranian footballer

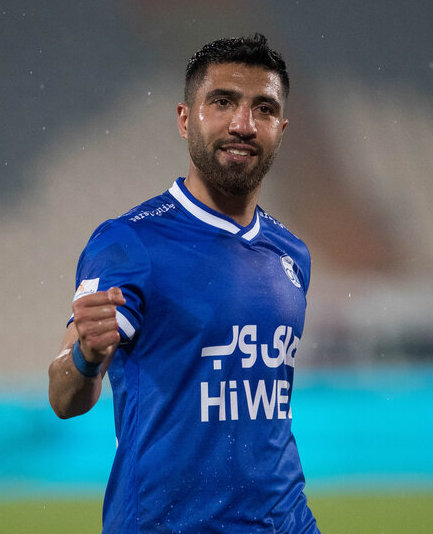
- Esmaeili with Esteghlal in 2021

Personal information
- Full name: Farshid Esmaeili
- Date of birth: 23 February 1994 (age 32)
- Place of birth: Bandar Lengeh, Iran
- Height: 1.72 m (5 ft 8 in)
- Position: Midfielder

Team information
- Current team: Zob Ahan
- Number: 88

Youth career
- 2006–2011: Badr Hormozgan
- 2011–2012: Fajr Sepasi

Senior career*
Years	Team	Apps	(Gls)
2012–2015	Fajr Sepasi	36	(3)
2015–2021	Esteghlal	131	(13)
2021–2022	Al-Arabi	14	(1)
2022–2023	Foolad	0	(0)
2023–2024	Nassaji Mazandaran	12	(1)
2024–2025	Paykan	12	(0)
2025	Mes Rafsanjan	11	(0)
2025–2026	Fajr Sepasi	21	(2)
2026–	Zob Ahan	8	(1)

International career
2011–2012	Iran U20	14	(2)
2013–2016	Iran U23	9	(0)
- * Club domestic league appearances and goals as of 28 December 2023

Farshid Esmaeili (Persian: فرشید اسماعیلی; born 23 February 1994) is an Iranian professional footballer who plays as a midfielder for Persian Gulf Pro League club Zob Ahan.

== Club career ==
=== Early career ===
Born in Bandar Lengeh, Esmaeili started his career with Badr Hormozgan from youth levels. In the summer 2011, he joined Fajr Sepasi U-20 and after a good season he was promoted to the first team. Esmaeili made his debut for Fajr Sepasi in a 6–1 win against Damash on 15 September 2012. He spent three years with Fajr Sepasi in Shiraz.

=== Esteghlal ===
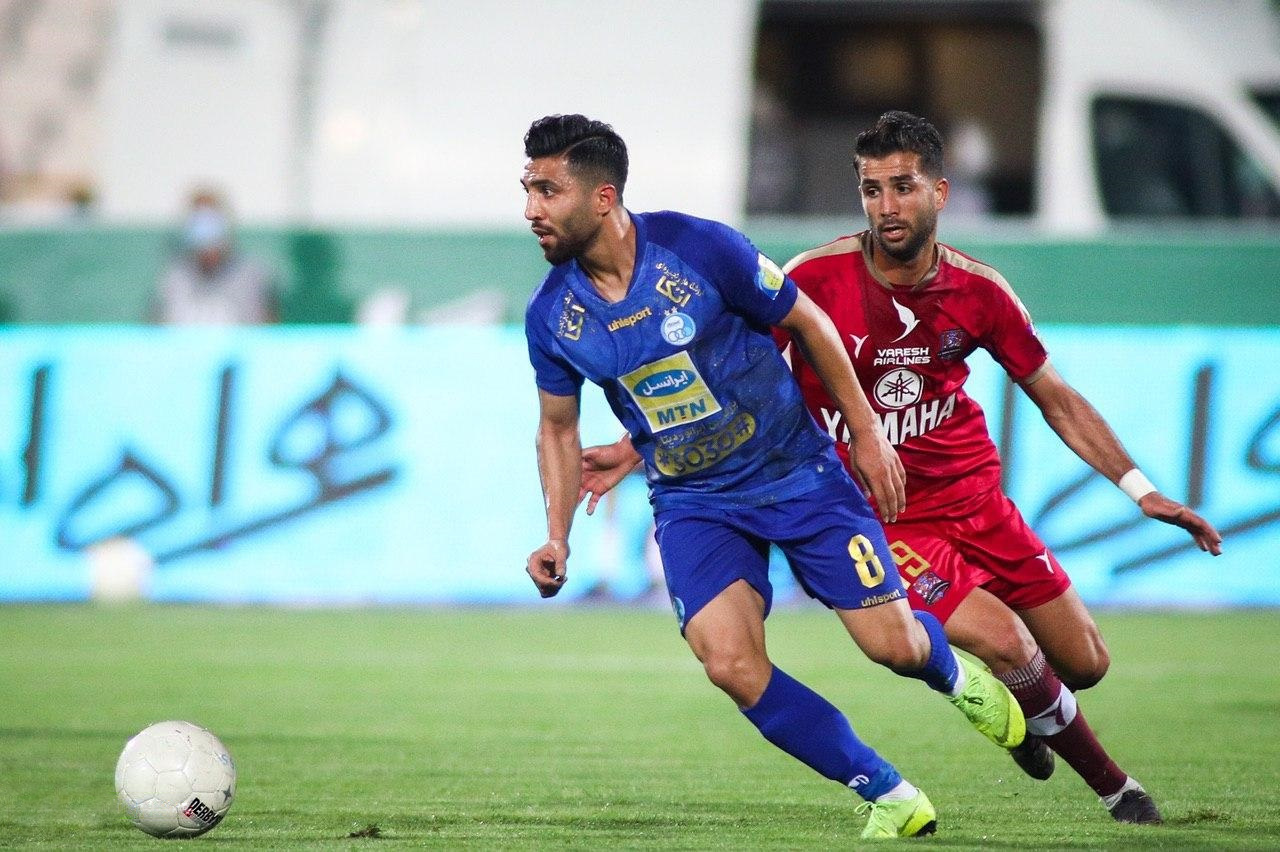
Esmaeili with Esteghlal, 2020

On 5 July 2015, Esmaeili joined Iranian Pro League club Esteghlal on a three-year contract. He scored his first goal for Taj against Sepahan with a long-distance shot in a 3–0 away win. Esmaeili scored a goal and assisted one during Esteghlal's 3–2 win in Tehran derby against Persepolis on 12 February 2017 and was named as best player of the match. He played regularly for Esteghlal under the management of Alireza Mansourian. Under German coach Winfried Schäfer, he was one of the most successful players in Iran, he also was selected as one of the best players and the top assists at the 2018 AFC Champions League. He finished his third season with the team with six goals and assisted 13 times in 34 games. Esmaeili made significant strides in his ability as a playmaker, also forming a formidable partnership with his teammates, the Uzbek Server Djeparov and the Senegalese Mame Thiam. He scored 6 goals and had 5 assists in 35 matches in his last season with the club. In August 2021, Esmaeili was linked to his move to rival Persepolis and an Emirati team. In October 2021, he joined Qatari side Al-Arabi as a free agent, replacing of his injured compatriot Mehrdad Mohammadi.

== International career ==
=== Youth ===
Esmaeili was part of Iran U-20 during 2012 AFC U-19 Championship qualification, 2012 CIS Cup, 2012 AFF U-19 Youth Championship and 2012 AFC U-19 Championship.

=== U23 ===
Esmaeili invited to Iran U-23 training camp by Nelo Vingada to preparation for Incheon 2014 and 2016 AFC U-22 Championship (Summer Olympic qualification). He named in Iran U23 final list for Incheon 2014.

=== Senior ===
Esmaeili was first called up to Team Melli training camp in September 2017 by Carlos Queiroz. He was invited again to the Iran in August 2021 by Dragan Skočić.

== Style of play ==
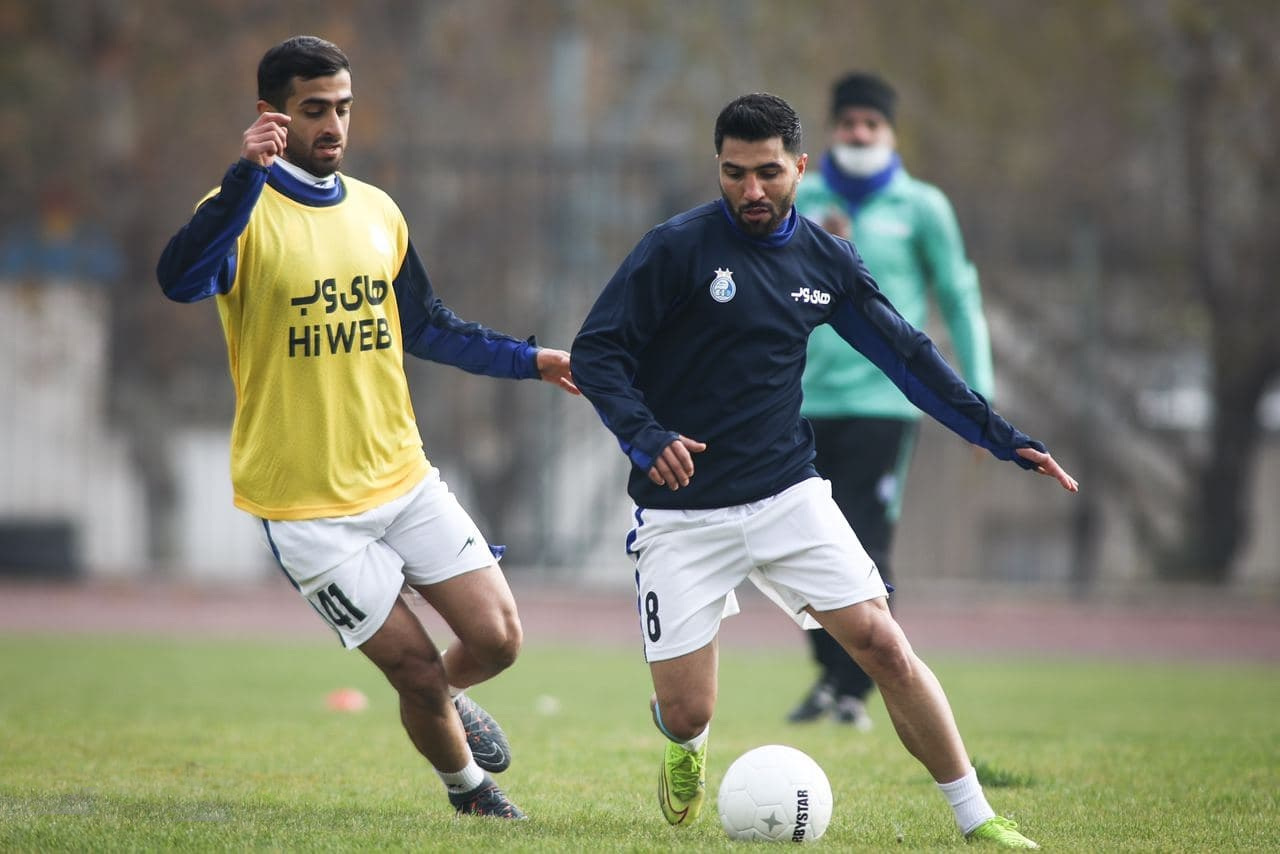
Esmaeili in Esteghlal training, 2020

Esmaeili is good on the ball with both feet and his direct running at players. In his early beginnings, he played as a forward, but was converted into a midfielder after moving to Fajr Sepasi. Esmaeili showed his best performance when playing as an attacking midfielder or as a winger. He played as a defensive midfielder on occasion for his ability to retrieve the ball, so Esmaeili is considered a utility player.

== Career statistics ==
=== Club ===
As of 28 December 2023

Club performance			League		Cup		Continental		Total	
Season	Club	League	Apps	Goals	Apps	Goals	Apps	Goals	Apps	Goals
Iran			League		Hazfi Cup		Asia		Total	
2012–13	Fajr Sepasi	Pro League	17	2	1	0	—		18	2
2013–14	Fajr Sepasi	Pro League	4	0	0	0	—		4	0
2014–15	Fajr Sepasi	Azadegan League	14	1	0	0	—		14	1
Total			35	3	1	0	—		36	3
2015–16	Esteghlal	Pro League	15	1	5	0	—		20	1
2016–17	Esteghlal	Pro League	27	2	3	0	8	1	38	3
2017–18	Esteghlal	Pro League	23	5	4	1	9	0	36	6
2018–19	Esteghlal	Pro League	21	2	2	1	3	0	26	3
2019–20	Esteghlal	Pro League	22	2	4	1	3	0	29	3
2020–21	Esteghlal	Pro League	22	1	5	2	5	3	32	6
Total			130	13	23	5	28	4	181	22
2021–22	Al-Arabi	Stars League	14	1	1	0	0	0	15	1
Total			14	1	1	0	0	0	15	1
2022–2023	Foolad	Pro League	0	0	0	0	0	0	0	0
Total			0	0	0	0	0	0	0	0
2023–24	Nassaji	Pro League	12	1	0	0	6	0	18	1
Total			12	1	0	0	6	0	18	1
Career total			191	18	25	5	34	4	250	27

Season	Team	Assists
Esteghlal
Esteghlal	2015–16	0
Esteghlal	2016–17	4
Esteghlal	2017–18	13
Esteghlal	2018–19	5
Esteghlal	2019–20	5
Esteghlal	2020–21	5
Nassaji	2023–24	4
Total		36

=== International ===
National team	Year	Apps	Goals
Iran
Iran	2017	0	0
Iran	2018	0	0
Iran	2021	0	0
Total		0	0

== Honours ==
Esteghlal

- Hazfi Cup: 2017–18

Al Arabi

- QFA Cup: 2022

Individual

- Persian Gulf Pro League Team of the Year: 2016–17
- AFC Champions League Top Assist: 2018 (5 assists)
- AFC Champions League Fans' Best XI: 2018
