= Behnam Barzay =

Iranian footballer

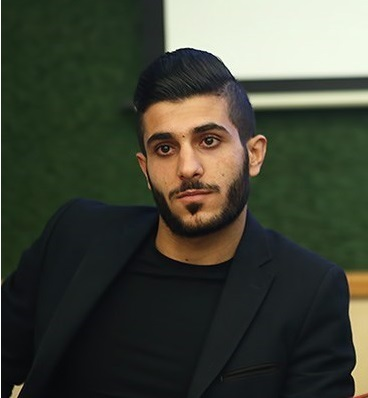

Personal information
- Date of birth: 11 February 1993 (age 33)
- Place of birth: Behbahan, Iran
- Height: 1.75 m (5 ft 9 in)
- Position: Right winger

Team information
- Current team: Malavan
- Number: 77

Youth career
- 2008–2010: Sanat Naft

Senior career*
Years	Team	Apps	(Gls)
2010–2013	Sanat Naft	21	(2)
2013–2015	Rah Ahan	26	(2)
2015–2018	Esteghlal	44	(7)
2018–2019	Sanat Naft	8	(0)
2019	Padideh	14	(1)
2019–2024	Gol Gohar	120	(4)
2024–2025	Mes Rafsanjan	10	(1)
2025	Malavan	9	(0)
2026–	Malavan	8	(0)

International career^{‡}
2011–2013	Iran U20	20	(7)
2013–2016	Iran U23	11	(7)
Medal record
Representing Iran
AFF U-19 Youth Championship
Winner	2012 Vietnam
- * Club domestic league appearances and goals as of 11 March 2026 ‡ National team caps and goals as of 31 March 2015

Behnam Barzay (Persian: بهنام برزای; born 11 February 1993) is an Iranian footballer who plays for Malavan in the Persian Gulf Pro League.

== Career ==
He played his entire career in Sanat Naft for three seasons. In June 2013, he was moved to Rah Ahan after Sanat Naft's relegation.

=== Esteghlal ===
On 1 February 2015, he joined to Esteghlal on a two-and-a-half-year contract.

His good performances in the 2014–15 season drew the attention of La Liga club Getafe CF who were interested to sign him.

In June 2017, he left the club after his contract ran out. However, with the appointment of Winfried Schäfer as the new Esteghlal manager, he signed a new two-and-a-half-year contract with the club on 5 November 2017, allowing him to play from January 2018.

== Club career statistics ==
As of 3 March 2017

Club	Division	Season	League		Hazfi Cup		Asia		Total	
Club	Division	Season	Apps	Goals	Apps	Goals	Apps	Goals	Apps	Goals
Sanat Naft	Pro League	2010–11	1	0	0	0	–	–	1	0
Sanat Naft	Pro League	2011–12	1	0	0	0	–	–	1	0
Sanat Naft	Pro League	2012–13	19	2	2	3	–	–	21	5
Sanat Naft	Total		21	2	2	3	0	0	23	5
Rah Ahan	Persian Gulf Pro League	2013–14	18	2	1	0	–	–	19	2
Rah Ahan	Persian Gulf Pro League	2014–15	6	0	1	0	–	–	7	0
Rah Ahan	Total		24	2	2	0	0	0	26	2
Esteghlal	Persian Gulf Pro League	2014–15	8	0	0	0	–	–	2	0
Esteghlal	Persian Gulf Pro League	2015–16	18	2	2	0	–	–	20	2
Esteghlal	Persian Gulf Pro League	2016–17	18	4	3	1	5	0	26	5
Esteghlal	Persian Gulf Pro League	2017-18	5	1	1	0	2	0	8	1
Esteghlal	Total		49	7	6	1	7	0	62	8
Sanat	Persian Gulf Pro League	2018-19	8	0	0	0	0	0	8	0
Shahr Khodro	Persian Gulf Pro League	2018-19	14	1	1	0	0	0	15	1
Gol Gohar	Persian Gulf Pro League	2019-20	25	3	1	0	0	0	26	3
Gol Gohar	Persian Gulf Pro League	2020-21	27	0	3	0	0	0	30	0
Gol Gohar	Persian Gulf Pro League	2021-22	21	1	0	0	0	0	21	1
Gol Gohar	Persian Gulf Pro League	2022-23	22	0	2	0	0	0	24	0
Gol Gohar	Persian Gulf Pro League	2023-24	25	0	2	0	0	0	27	0
Gol Gohar	Total		120	4	8	0	0	0	128	4
Career total			236	16	19	4	7	0	262	20

- Assists

Season	Team	Assists
15–16	Esteghlal	2
16–17	Esteghlal	0

== International career ==
=== U20 ===
He was part of Iran U–20 during 2012 AFC U-19 Championship qualification, 2012 CIS Cup, 2012 AFF U-19 Youth Championship and 2012 AFC U-19 Championship.

=== U23 ===
He invited to Iran U-23 training camp by Nelo Vingada to preparation for Incheon 2014 and 2016 AFC U-22 Championship (Summer Olympic qualification).

== Honours ==
=== Club ===
Esteghlal

- Hazfi Cup: 2017–18
