= Omid Ebrahimi =

Iranian footballer (born 1987)

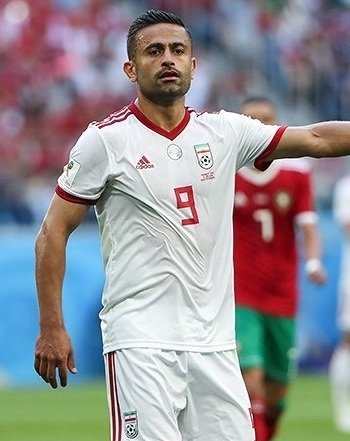
- Ebrahimi with Iran at the 2018 FIFA World Cup

Personal information
- Full name: Omid Ebrahimi Zarandini
- Date of birth: 15 September 1987 (age 39)
- Place of birth: Neka, Mazandaran, Iran
- Height: 1.78 m (5 ft 10 in)
- Position: Defensive midfielder

Team information
- Current team: Lusail SC (on loan from Al Shamal)
- Number: 6

Youth career
- 2004–2006: Shahrdari Neka
- 2006–2009: Bank Melli

Senior career*
Years	Team	Apps	(Gls)
2009–2010	Sh. Bandar Abbas	26	(6)
2010–2014	Sepahan	118	(18)
2014–2018	Esteghlal	108	(28)
2018–2021	Al Ahli	43	(6)
2019–2020	→ Eupen (loan)	18	(0)
2021–2023	Al-Wakrah	30	(3)
2023–	Al-Shamal	64	(5)
2026–	→ Lusail SC (loan)	0	(0)

International career
2012–2024	Iran	64	(1)
- * Club domestic league appearances and goals as of 18 April 2025

Omid Ebrahimi (Persian: امید ابراهیمی; born 16 September 1987) is an Iranian footballer who plays for Lusail SC on loan from Al-Shamal as a defensive midfielder.

== Early years ==
Omid Ebrahimi was born in Zarandin-e Sofla, a village located in Neka County.

== Club career ==
Omid Ebrahimi was discovered by Amir Ghalenoei in 2011. He started his career in Esteghlal Dargahan. He joined Sepahan in 2010 after spending the previous season at Shahrdari Bandar Abbas in the Azadegan League. Ebrahimi's first competitive appearance came in the Iran Pro League match against Rah Ahan on 27 July 2010, where he played the full 90 minutes.

On 10 June 2014, Ebrahimi signed a two-year contract with Esteghlal. He spent an excellent career in Blues of the Capital and selected as the best midfielder of Persian Gulf Pro League in 2015–16 and 2016–17 seasons and also became the best goalscorer among midfielders in the history of Esteghlal.

== International career ==
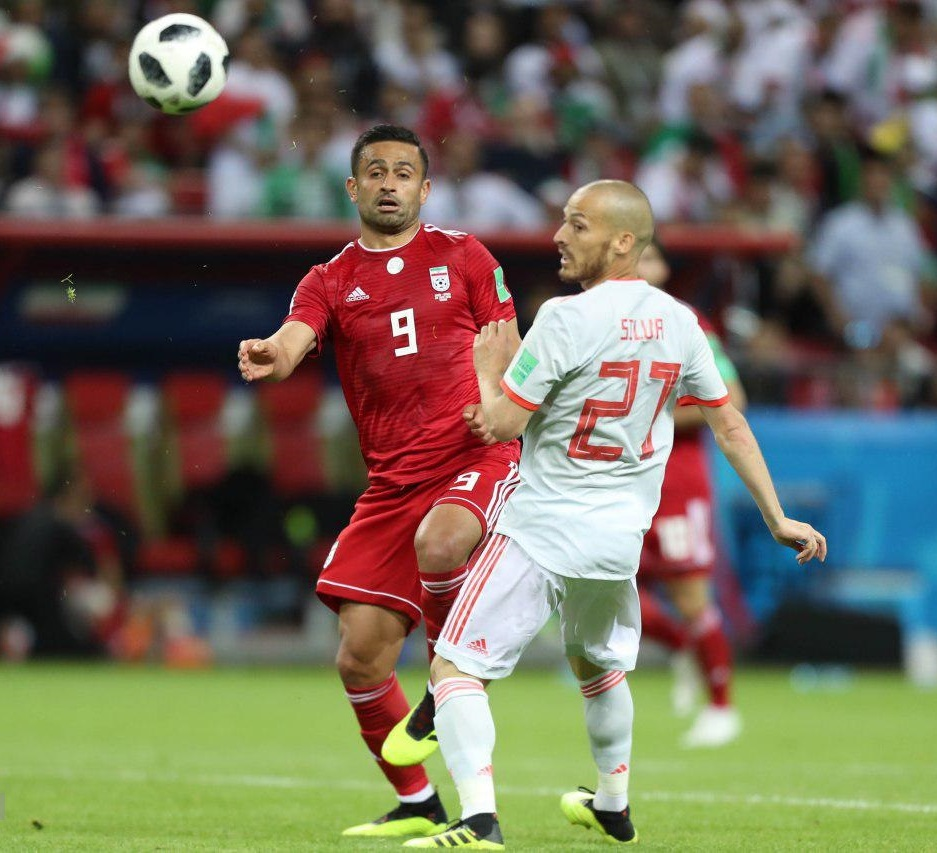
Ebrahimi playing for Iran, against Spain in the 2018 FIFA World Cup

He made his debut under Carlos Queiroz on 9 December 2012 in a match against Saudi Arabia in the 2012 WAFF. He was called into Iran's 2015 AFC Asian Cup squad on 30 December 2014 by Carlos Queiroz. In May 2018 he was named in Iran's preliminary squad for the 2018 FIFA World Cup in Russia.

== Career statistics ==
=== Club ===
As of 18 April 2025

Appearances and goals by club, season and competition
Club	Season	League			National Cup		Continental		Other		Total	
Club	Season	Division	Apps	Goals	Apps	Goals	Apps	Goals	Apps	Goals	Apps	Goals
Sh. Bandar Abbas	2009–10	Azadegan League	26	6	0	0	–		–		26	6
Sepahan	2010–11	Persian Gulf Pro League	26	0	4	1	9 (Note: Appearances in AFC Champions League)	1	–		39	2
Sepahan	2011–12	Persian Gulf Pro League	32	6	1	1	9	0	–		42	7
Sepahan	2012–13	Persian Gulf Pro League	32	8	4	0	6	1	–		42	9
Sepahan	2013–14	Persian Gulf Pro League	28	4	1	0	6	0	–		35	4
Sepahan	Total		118	18	10	2	30	2	–		158	22
Esteghlal	2014–15	Persian Gulf Pro League	28	9	3	0	–		–		31	9
Esteghlal	2015–16	Persian Gulf Pro League	28	10	4	1	–		–		32	11
Esteghlal	2016–17	Persian Gulf Pro League	28	7	2	0	7	1	–		37	8
Esteghlal	2017–18	Persian Gulf Pro League	24	2	4	0	6	0	–		34	2
Esteghlal	Total		108	28	13	1	13	1	–		134	30
Al Ahli	2018–19	Qatar Stars League	21	4	0	0	–		–		21	4
Al Ahli	2020–21	Qatar Stars League	22	2	5	0	–		1 (Note: Appearance in Emir of Qatar Cup)	0	28	2
Al Ahli	Total		43	6	5	0	–		1	0	49	6
Eupen (loan)	2019–20	Belgian First Division A	18	0	2	0	–		–		20	0
Al-Wakrah SC	2021–22	Qatar Stars League	17	1	2	0	–		–		19	1
Al-Wakrah SC	2022–23	Qatar Stars League	13	2	0	0	–		–		13	2
Al Shamal	2023–24	Qatar Stars League	21	2	3	0	–		–		24	2
Al Shamal	2024–25	Qatar Stars League	21	0	4	0	–		–		25	0
Career total			385	63	39	3	43	3	1	0	468	69

=== International caps ===
Statistics accurate as of match played 7 February 2024.

Iran
Year	Apps	Goals
2012	3	0
2013	2	0
2014	1	0
2015	10	0
2016	4	0
2017	5	0
2018	14	0
2019	12	0
2021	1	0
2022	3	0
2023	1	0
2024	8	1
Total	64	1

=== International goals ===
No.	Date	Venue	Opponent	Score	Result	Competition
1	5 January 2024	Olympic Stadium, Kish, Iran	Burkina Faso	2–1	2–1	Friendly

== Honours ==
Sepahan

- Persian Gulf Pro League: 2010–11, 2011–12
- Hazfi Cup: 2012–13

Esteghlal

- Hazfi Cup: 2017–18

Individual

- Persian Gulf Pro League Team of the Year: 2014–15, 2015–16, 2016–17, 2017–18
- Persian Gulf Pro League Midfielder of the Year: 2015–16, 2016–17, 2017–18
- AFC Asian Cup Team of the Tournament: 2019
