= Hanif Omranzadeh =

Iranian former footballer (born 1985)

Hanif Omran Zadeh
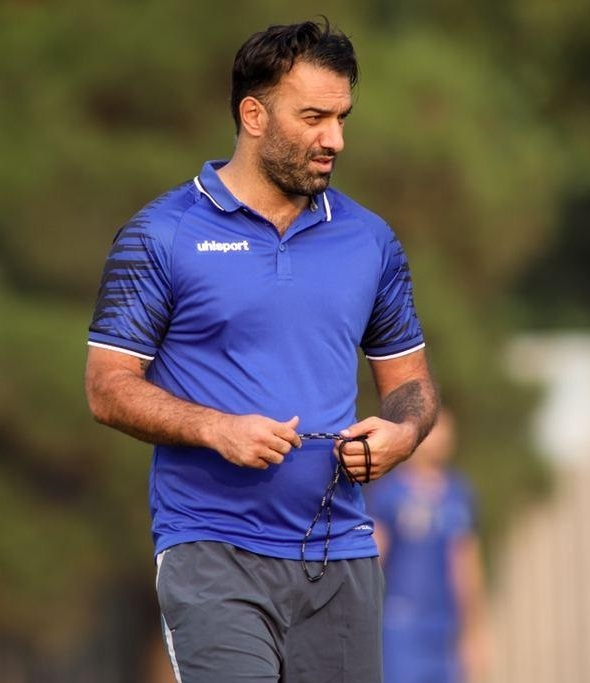
- Omranzadeh with Esteghlal in training in 2020

Personal information
- Date of birth: April 30, 1985 (age 41)
- Place of birth: Nur, Iran
- Height: 1.93 m (6 ft 4 in)
- Position: Centre back

Team information
- Current team: Naft Masjed Soleyman (assistant coach)

Youth career
- 1998–2000: Shahin Tehran

Senior career*
Years	Team	Apps	(Gls)
2001–2004	Pas	1	(0)
2004–2005	→ Malavan (loan)	9	(1)
2005–2006	Pas Tehran	17	(2)
2006–2008	Pas Hamedan	49	(7)
2008–2016	Esteghlal	156	(9)
2016	Khooneh Be Khooneh	11	(0)
2016–2017	Saba Qom	14	(0)
2017–2018	Siah Jamegan	5	(0)
Total		261	(19)

International career
2010–2011	Iran	4	(0)
- * Club domestic league appearances and goals

Hanif Omran Zadeh (Persian: حنیف عمران زاده, born April 30, 1985) is an Iranian former footballer who played as a defender and current assistant coach of Naft Masjed Soleyman. He played for Pas Tehran, Pas Hamedan, Esteghlal, Malavan and Siah Jamegan Khorasan during his career.

== Club career ==
He started in 2007–08 seasons with Pas and finally moved to Esteghlal in July 2009. On 1 June 2012, he extended his contract with Esteghlal until 2016. After 4 seasons with the club Omranzadeh left Esteghlal and joined newly promoted club Sanat Naft Abadan.

== Youth career ==
Omran Zadeh joined Shahin Tehran in 1998 and played there for 2 years.

== Senior career ==
Omranzadeh's first season in the Persian Gulf Pro League was with Pas Tehran which was coached by Majid Jalali at the time. He won his first league title that year. After spending one season with Pas Tehran he joined Malavan F.C on loan which was coached by Nosrat Irandoost. One year later he came back to Pas Tehran for 2005–2006 season. When Pas was moved to Hamedan in 2006, Omranzadeh followed and spent two seasons there. In 2008 he joined Esteghlal where he played under managers such as: Amir Ghalenoei, Abdolsamad Marfavi and Parviz Mazloomi. He played a total of 203 matches for Esteghlal and found the net 13 times. In 2016 he joined Khoone be Khoone F.C which compete in Azadegan League and played under Hadi Marzban for 4 months. In 2016–17 season he joined Sabaye Qom F.C to play under Samad Marfavi again. In 2017–18 season which was his last season as professional football player he joined Siah Jamegan Khorasan F.C to play under Reza Enayati.

Omranzadeh won Persian Gulf Pro League twice with Esteghlal and once with Pas Tehran. He also won Iran's Hazfi Cup once with Esteghlal in 2012. In 2013 he was selected for team of the tournament along with his teammate Javad Nekounam and played a role in Esteghlal's third place triumph in AFC Champions league.

== Retirement ==
Omranzadeh's last season as a professional player in Iranian football league was with Siah Jamegan Khorasan F.C during 2016–17 season, which ended by being relegated to Azadegan League. On November 14, 2018, he officially announced his retirement with an open letter.

== International career ==
Omranzadeh received his first national call in 2003 where he played in Iran's under-17 national team under Hamid Alidoosti. Omranzadeh played for Iran's under-23 national team as well which was coached by René Simões and Vinko Begović. He also played for Iran's national team. Between 2009 and 2010 he made 4 appearances for Iran's national team.

He was called up by Afshin Ghotbi for the final three matches in 2010 FIFA World Cup qualification but did not play any match. He made senior his debut on 7 September 2010 against Korea Republic. He went on to make three appearances for Iran in the 2010 WAFF Championship.

== Honours ==
=== Club ===
Pas Tehran

- Iran Pro League (1): 2003–04, Runner-up 2005–06

Esteghlal

- Iran Pro League (1): 2012–13, Runner-up 2010–11
- Hazfi Cup (1): 2011–12, Runner-up 2015–16

=== Individual ===
- AFC Champions League Dream Team (1): 2013
