= Yaghoub Karimi =

Iranian footballer

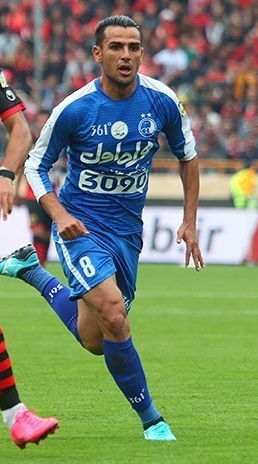

Personal information
- Full name: Yaghoub Karimi
- Date of birth: 31 August 1991 (age 35)
- Place of birth: Kivi, Ardabil, Iran
- Height: 1.75 m (5 ft 9 in)
- Positions: Attacking midfielder; winger

Youth career
- 2003–2008: Pas
- 2008–2011: Esteghlal

Senior career*
Years	Team	Apps	(Gls)
2009–2011	Esteghlal	1	(0)
2011–2013	Naft Tehran	55	(11)
2013–2014	Sepahan	17	(1)
2014–2018	Esteghlal	51	(1)
2018	Esteghlal Khuzestan	6	(0)
2018–2019	Sepidrood	9	(0)
Total		139	(13)

International career^{‡}
2009–2010	Iran U20	4	(0)
2011–2014	Iran U23	15	(6)
2012–2014	Iran	6	(4)
- * Club domestic league appearances and goals as of 10 March 2016 (UTC) ‡ National team caps and goals as of September 15, 2014 (UTC)

Yaghoub Karimi (Persian: یعقوب کریمی; August 31, 1991) is an Iranian football midfielder.

== Club career ==
=== Pas ===
He joined Pas in the summer 2003 from the youth academy. He played five seasons for Pas youth team.

=== Esteghlal ===
In summer 2009, Karimi joined Esteghlal. He played his first match for Esteghlal in 2010–11 season.

=== Naft Tehran ===
He played two seasons for Esteghlal and moved to Naft Tehran in the summer of 2011. Karimi played with Naft Tehran until 2013. He played in 54 games, scored 11 times and assists 14 goals. He was most value player for Naft Tehran in 2011–12 and 2012–13 seasons.

=== Sepahan ===
Naft Tehran and Sepahan reached agreement over transfer of Karimi in May 2013. He officially joined Sepahan on 1 July 2013 with a four-year contract and made his debut for his new team in a 2–0 win over Foolad.

=== Esteghlal ===
On 21 July 2014, Karimi joined Esteghlal with signing a loan contract until the end of the season. He played his first match for Esteghlal on ten days later against Rah Ahan, coming as a substitute for Khosro Heydari. On 27 July 2015, he signed a permanent contract with Esteghlal keeping him at the club until 2017.

=== Club career statistics ===
As of 27 February 2019

Club performance			League		Cup		Continental		Total	
Season	Club	League	Apps	Goals	Apps	Goals	Apps	Goals	Apps	Goals
Iran			League		Hazfi Cup		Asia		Total	
2010–11	Esteghlal	Iran Pro League	1	0	0	0	0	0	1	0
2011–12	Naft Tehran	Iran Pro League	26	1	1	0	–	–	27	1
2012–13	Naft Tehran	Iran Pro League	29	10	1	0	–	–	30	10
2013–14	Sepahan	Iran Pro League	17	1	1	0	6	0	24	1
2014–15	Esteghlal	Iran Pro League	20	1	3	0	0	0	23	1
2015–16	Esteghlal	Iran Pro League	14	0	3	0	–	–	17	0
2016–17	Esteghlal	Iran Pro League	16	0	2	0	0	0	18	0
2017–18	Esteghlal	Iran Pro League	8	0	0	0	1	0	9	0
2018–19	Esteghlal Khuzestan	Iran Pro League	6	0	0	0	–	–	6	0
Career total			138	13	11	0	6	0	155	13

- Assists

Season	Team	Assists
11–12	Naft Tehran	4
12–13	Naft Tehran	7
13–14	Sepahan	0
14–15	Esteghlal	2
15–16	Esteghlal	2
16–17	Esteghlal	0

== International career ==
On 15 February 2012, Karimi named in Iran squad by Carlos Queiroz. He named in Iran U23 final list for Incheon 2014.

=== International goals ===
Scores and results list Iran's goal tally first.

#	Date	Venue	Opponent	Score	Result	Competition
1	6 November 2012	Azadi Stadium, Tehran	Tajikistan	2–0	6–1	Friendly
2	6 November 2012	Azadi Stadium, Tehran	Tajikistan	4–0	6–1	Friendly
3	15 December 2012	Al-Sadaqua Walsalam Stadium, Kuwait City	Yemen	2–1	2–1	2012 West Asian Football Federation Championship
4	3 March 2014	Enghelab Stadium, Karaj	Kuwait	1–0	3–2	2015 AFC Asian Cup qualification

== Honours ==
=== Club ===
Esteghlal

- Persian Gulf Pro League Runner up (2): 2010–11, 2016–17
- Hazfi Cup Runner up (1): 2015–16
