= Meysam Majidi =

Iranian footballer

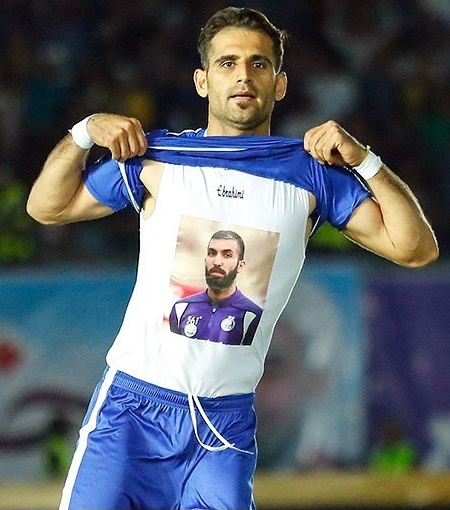

Personal information
- Full name: Meysam Majidi
- Date of birth: October 25, 1986 (age 40)
- Place of birth: Arak, Iran
- Height: 1.81 m (5 ft 11 in)
- Position: Left back

Youth career
- 2005–2007: Fajr Sepasi

Senior career*
Years	Team	Apps	(Gls)
2007–2009	Aluminium Arak	26	(0)
2009–2010	Shensa	16	(0)
2010–2014	Aluminium Hormozgan	84	(10)
2014–2015	Esteghlal Khuzestan	27	(7)
2015–2017	Esteghlal	25	(2)
2017	Saba Qom	9	(2)
2017	Al-Shamal		
2017–2019	Baadraan Tehran	33	(5)
2019–2023	Aluminium Arak	48	(7)
- * Club domestic league appearances and goals

Meysam Majidi (Persian: ميثم مجيدى; born 25 October 1986) is a retired Football player who mostly played as a defender.

== Club career ==
=== Club career statistics ===
As of 15 July 2019

Club performance			League		Cup		Other		Total	
Season	Club	League	Apps	Goals	Apps	Goals	Apps	Goals	Apps	Goals
2010–11	Aluminium Hormozgan	Azadegan League	19	1	1	0	—		20	1
2011–12	Aluminium Hormozgan	Azadegan League	18	2	0	0	—		18	2
2012–13	Aluminium Hormozgan	Persian Gulf Pro League	25	2	0	0	—		25	2
2013–14	Aluminium Hormozgan	Azadegan League	22	5	0	0	—		22	5
2014–15	Esteghlal Khuzestan	Persian Gulf Pro League	27	7	2	2	2	0	31	9
2015–16	Esteghlal	Persian Gulf Pro League	24	2	5	1	—		29	3
2016–17	Esteghlal	Persian Gulf Pro League	1	0	1	0	—		2	0
2016–17	Saba Qom	Persian Gulf Pro League	9	2	0	0	—		9	2
2017–18	Al-Shamal	Qatari Second Division					—			
2017–18	Baadraan Tehran	Azadegan League	10	1	0	0	—		10	1
2018–19	Baadraan Tehran	Azadegan League	19	4	1	0	—		20	4
Career total							2	0		

- Assist Goals

Season	Team	Assists
12–13	Aluminium Hormozgan	0
14–15	Esteghlal Khuzestan	3
15–16	Esteghlal	4
16–17	Esteghlal	0
16–17	Saba Qom	1
17–18	Baadraan Tehran	0
18–19	Baadraan Tehran	0

== International career ==
Majidi was called up to the senior Iran squad for a 2018 FIFA World Cup qualifier against Guam in November 2015.
