= 2016–17 Tractor S.C. season =

Tractor
2016–17 season
- Chairman: Mostafa Ajorlu
- Manager: Amir Ghalenoei
- Stadium: Tractor Stadium; Sahand Stadium
- Persian Gulf Pro League: 3rd
- Hazfi Cup: Runner-up
- Top goalscorer: League: Farzad Hatami &Edinho (7 goals); All: Farzad Hatami (10 goals)
- Highest home attendance: 45,000 v Esteghlal (20 April 2017)
- Lowest home attendance: 0 (spectator ban) v Sanat Naft (17 January 2017)
- Average home league attendance: 8,133
Home colours	Away colours

The 2016–17 season is Tractor's 9th season in the Persian Gulf Pro League. Tractor is captained by Mehdi Kiani.

== Club ==
Position	Staff
Head coach	Amir Ghalenoei
First team coach	Rahman Rezaei
Assistant coach	Ali Reza Pezhman
Assistant coach	Rodolfo Correa
Fitness coach	Saeid Nikokheslat
Goalkeeper coach	Rui Tavares
Analyzer	António Oliveira
Doctor & Physiotherapist	Ramzan Norouzzadeh
Psychologist	Akbar Sobhi
B team manager	Farhad Pourgholami
Technical manager	Ahad Sheykhlari

=== Management ===
Position	Staff
President	Mostafa Ajorlu
Vice President	Khosro Abdollahzadeh
Board chairman	Ali Akbar Pourjamshidian
Board members	Sadegh Najafi-Khazarlou; Alireza Navin; Mohammad Javad Dolfkar; Muhammad Ismail Saidi; Ghafour Kargari; Dara Ghaznavi; Mohammad Ali Mojtahedi
Fans club president	Rahman Yavaran
Academy manager	Sadegh Pourhossein

== First Team Squad ==
=== Current squad ===
As of 7 January 2017

Note: Flags indicate national team as defined under FIFA eligibility rules; some limited exceptions apply. Players may hold more than one non-FIFA nationality.

No.	Pos.	Nation	Player
1	GK	(Iran) IRN	Mohammadreza Akhbari ^{U23} (on loan from Saipa)
2	DF	(Iran) IRN	Mohammad Iranpourian
4	DF	(Iran) IRN	Khaled Shafiei
5	DF	(Iran) IRN	Hadi Mohammadi (on loan from Zob Ahan)
6	MF	(Iran) IRN	Mehdi Kiani (Captain)
7	MF	(Iran) IRN	Saeid Aghaei
8	DF	(Iran) IRN	Mohsen Bengar
9	MF	(Iran) IRN	Omid Alishah (on loan from Persepolis)
10	FW	(Iran) IRN	Mohammad Ebrahimi
11	FW	(Brazil) BRA	Éder Luciano
13	MF	(Iraq) IRQ	Karrar Jassim
14	MF	(Iran) IRN	Mohammad Nouri
16	DF	(Iran) IRN	Mohammadreza Mehdizadeh
17	MF	(Iran) IRN	Soroush Rafiei
18	MF	(Iran) IRN	Ahmad Nourollahi (on loan from Persepolis)

No.	Pos.	Nation	Player
19	DF	(Iran) IRN	Hashem Beikzadeh
20	FW	(Iran) IRN	Mehdi Sharifi
21	GK	(Iran) IRN	Farzin Garousian
24	FW	(Iran) IRN	Farzad Hatami
25	MF	(Iran) IRN	Alireza Ramezani
27	MF	(Iran) IRN	Fakher Tahami^{U21}
28	MF	(Iran) IRN	Mohammad Naderi ^{U21}
32	DF	(Iran) IRN	Aref Aghasi^{U21}
66	MF	(Iran) IRN	Sina Ashouri
70	DF	(Iran) IRN	Amir Reza Nasr Azadani^{U21}
77	MF	(Iran) IRN	Shahram Goudarzi
88	MF	(Iran) IRN	Ali Taheran^{U21}

== Transfers ==
=== Summer ===
In: Note: Flags indicate national team as defined under FIFA eligibility rules; some limited exceptions apply. Players may hold more than one non-FIFA nationality.

No.	Pos.	Nation	Player
66	MF	(Iran) IRN	Sina Ashouri (from Zob Ahan, previously on loan)
—	MF	(Iran) IRN	Saeid Moradi^{U23} (from Parseh Tehran)
—	DF	(Iran) IRN	Mohsen Bengar^{PL} (from Persepolis)
—	FW	(Iran) IRN	Shahram Goudarzi^{PL} (from Gostaresh Foulad)
10	FW	(Iran) IRN	Mohammad Ebrahimi^{PL} (from Gostaresh Foulad)
—	DF	(Iran) IRN	Mohammad Naderi^{U23} (from Moghavemat Tehran)
—	DF	(Iran) IRN	Mohammadreza Mehdizadeh^{U21} (from Shahre Baran)
—	GK	(Iran) IRN	Mohammad Amin Bahrami^{U21} (from Zob Ahan)
—	MF	(Iran) IRN	Soheil Salehi^{U21} (from Naft va Gaz Gachsaran)
—	MF	(Iran) IRN	Ali Taheran^{U21} (from Tractor)
14	MF	(Iran) IRN	Mohammad Nouri (from (Qatar) Al-Meisameer)
13	MF	(Iraq) IRQ	Karrar Jassim (from (Iraq) Naft Al-Wasat)
44	DF	(Iran) IRN	Hadi Mohammadi^{PL} (from Zob Ahan)
—	MF	(Iran) IRN	Alireza Ramezani^{PL} (from Esteghlal)
—	FW	(Brazil) BRA	Edinho (from (Qatar) Al-Sailiya)
—	DF	(Iran) IRN	Aref Aghasi^{U21} (from Foolad)
—	MF	(Iran) IRN	Mohammad Papi^{U21} (from Sepahan U23 – conscription)

Out: Note: Flags indicate national team as defined under FIFA eligibility rules; some limited exceptions apply. Players may hold more than one non-FIFA nationality.

No.	Pos.	Nation	Player
3	DF	(Iran) IRN	Shoja' Khalilzadeh (to Sepahan – conscription return)
5	DF	(Brazil) BRA	Carlos Cardoso (End of Contract)
8	FW	(Iran) IRN	Shahin Saghebi (to Malavan – conscription return)
11	MF	(Iran) IRN	Bakhtiar Rahmani (to Esteghlal)
12	GK	(Iran) IRN	Masoud Homami (End of Contract)
15	MF	(Iran) IRN	Ayoub Kalantari (to FC Mashhad)
16	MF	(Iran) IRN	Mohammad Pour Rahmatollah (to Malavan – conscription return)
18	MF	(Philippines) PHI	Iain Ramsay (to (Netherlands) NEC)
19	MF	(Brazil) BRA	Augusto César (loan return to (Brazil) Internacional)
27	FW	(Cameroon) CMR	Aloys Nong (End of Contract)
34	FW	(Iran) IRN	Mehran Ghorbanpour (to Machine Sazi)
40	DF	(Iran) IRN	Ali Hamoudi (to Sepahan – conscription return)
44	DF	(Iran) IRN	Peyman Keshavarz (to Machine Sazi)
88	MF	(Iran) IRN	Fardin Abedini (End of Contract)
—	MF	(Iran) IRN	Saeid Moradi (loan to FC Mashhad, previously at Parseh Tehran)

=== Winter ===
In: Note: Flags indicate national team as defined under FIFA eligibility rules; some limited exceptions apply. Players may hold more than one non-FIFA nationality.

No.	Pos.	Nation	Player
—	MF	(Iran) IRN	Ahmad Nourollahi (from Persepolis on loan)
—	FW	(Iran) IRN	Omid Alishah (from Persepolis on loan)

Out: Note: Flags indicate national team as defined under FIFA eligibility rules; some limited exceptions apply. Players may hold more than one non-FIFA nationality.

No.	Pos.	Nation	Player
—	MF	(Iran) IRN	Soroush Rafiei (to Persepolis)

== Competitions ==
=== Overall ===
Competition	Started round	Current position / round	Final position / round	First match	Last match
Persian Gulf Pro League	—	—	3rd	25 July 2016	4 May 2017
Hazfi Cup	Round of 64	—	Runner-up	30 September 2016	11 May 2017

Updated to match played 11 May 2017
Source: Competitions

=== Competition record ===
Competition	Record							
Competition	G	W	D	L	GF	GA	GD	Win %
Persian Gulf Pro League	30	15	11	4	38	24	+14	50.00
Hazfi Cup	6	5	0	1	11	4	+7	83.33
Total	36	20	11	5	49	28	+21	55.56

=== Persian Gulf Pro League ===
==== Standings ====
Pos	Team	Pld	W	D	L	GF	GA	GD	Pts	Qualification or relegation
1	Persepolis (C)	30	20	6	4	46	14	+32	66	Qualification for the 2018 AFC Champions League group stage
2	Esteghlal	30	16	9	5	45	27	+18	57	Qualification for the 2018 AFC Champions League group stage
3	Tractor Sazi	30	15	11	4	38	24	+14	56	Qualification for the 2018 AFC Champions League group stage
4	Zob Ahan	30	12	10	8	39	30	+9	46	Qualification for the 2018 AFC Champions League qualifying play-offs
5	Sepahan	30	12	9	9	38	34	+4	45	

Updated to match(es) played on 4 May 2017. Source: IPL Stats, Soccerway
Rules for classification: 1) Points; 2) Goal difference; 3) Goals scored.
(C) Champions

==== Results summary ====
Overall								Home						Away					
Pld	W	D	L	GF	GA	GD	Pts	W	D	L	GF	GA	GD	W	D	L	GF	GA	GD
30	15	11	4	38	24	+14	56	6	8	1	23	13	+10	9	3	3	15	11	+4

Last updated: 4 May 2017.
Source: Ipl Stats

==== Results by round ====
Round	1	2	3	4	5	6	7	8	9	10	11	12	13	14	15	16	17	18	19	20	21	22	23	24	25	26	27	28	29	30
Ground	H	A	H	A	H	A	H	A	H	A	H	H	A	H	A	A	H	A	H	A	H	A	H	A	H	A	A	H	A	H
Result	D	D	W	W	D	W	W	D	D	W	W	D	W	L	W	W	D	W	D	L	W	W	D	D	D	L	W	W	L	W
Position	6	7	3	2	2	1	1	2	2	2	1	2	2	2	2	2	2	2	2	2	2	2	2	2	3	3	3	2	3	3

Updated to match(es) played on 4 May 2017. Source: "Ipl".
A = Away; H = Home; W = Win; D = Draw; L = Loss

=== Matches ===
Win Draw Loss Postponed

Date Round	Home	Score	Away	Location

25 July 2016 1	Tractor	2 – 2	Esteghlal Khuzestan	Tabriz
18:00 DST+04:30	Edinho 14'; F. Hatami 60'	Report	R. Zahivi 58'; R. Zahivi 72'	Stadium: Tractor Stadium; Attendance: 5,000; Referee: Mohammad Reza Akbarian

1 August 2016 2	Sanat Naft	0 – 0	Tractor	Abadan
20:45 DST+04:30		Report		Stadium: Takhti Stadium; Attendance: 10,000; Referee: Ashkan Khorshidi

7 August 2016 3	Tractor	3 – 1	Paykan	Tabriz
18:00 DST+04:30	Edinho 23'; M. Ebrahimi 26'; K. Jassim 51'	Report	A. Sadeghi 27'	Stadium: Tractor Stadium; Attendance: 5,000; Referee: Reza Mahdavi

11 August 2016 4	Machine Sazi	0 – 2	Tractor	Tabriz
18:00 DST+04:30		Report	M. Iranpourian 30', 92'	Stadium: Tractor Stadium; Attendance: 5,000; Referee: Bijan Heydari

10 September 2016 5	Tractor	0 – 0	Persepolis	Tabriz
17:15 DST+04:30	M. Nouri (yellow card) 26'; H. Mohammadi (yellow card) 34'; S. Ashouri (yellow card) 81'	Report	K. Kamyabinia (yellow card) 84'	Stadium: Tractor Stadium; Attendance: 7,000; Referee: Ashkan Khorshidi

15 September 2016 6	Zob Ahan	1 – 2	Tractor	Isfahan
18:30 DST+04:30	A. Hamam 69'	Report	M. Iranpourian 40'; S. Ashouri 73'	Stadium: Foolad Shahr Stadium; Attendance: 1,000

20 September 2016 7	Tractor	3 – 0	Siah Jamegan	Tabriz
16:45 DST+04:30	M. Iranpourian 2'; F. Hatami 58'; M. Kiani 92'	Report		Stadium: Tractor Stadium; Attendance: 2,000; Referee: Seyed Hossein Zargar

15 October 2016 8	Saipa	0 – 0	Tractor	Tehran
17:00 DST+03:30		Report		Stadium: Shahid Dastgerdi Stadium; Attendance: 1,000; Referee: Alireza Faghani

20 October 2016 9	Tractor	2 – 2	Foolad	Tabriz
15:00 DST+03:30	Edinho 3'; S. Rafiei 67'	Report	E. Sharifat 29'; S. Ansari 65'	Stadium: Tractor Stadium; Attendance: 5,000; Referee: Mohammad Reza Akbarian

27 October 2016 10	Gostaresh Foulad	0 – 2	Tractor	Tabriz
14:45 DST+03:30		Report	Edinho 42', 47'	Stadium: Bonyan Diesel Stadium; Attendance: 2,500; Referee: Seyed Reza Mahdavi

25 November 2016 11	Tractor	2 – 1	Saba Qom	Tabriz
14:30 DST+03:30	F. Hatami 55'; M. Iranpourian 66'	Report	A. Hassanzadeh 71'	Stadium: Tractor Stadium; Attendance: 5,000; Referee: Hamid Haj Malek

2 December 2016 12	Tractor	1 – 1	Padideh	Tabriz
14:00 DST+03:30	F. Hatami 38'	Report	M. Yousefi 62'	Stadium: Tractor Stadium; Attendance: 5,000; Referee: Hossein Zahedifar

9 December 2016 13	Esteghlal	1 – 2	Tractor	Tehran
16:20 IRST (UTC+03:30)	K. Rezaei 7' (yellow card) 90+3'; O. Ebrahimi (yellow card) 29'; Y. Karimi (yellow card) 83'	Report	F. Hatami 56', 69' (yellow card) 77'	Stadium: Azadi Stadium; Attendance: 65,000; Referee: Bijan Heydari

16 December 2016 14	Tractor	1 – 2	Sepahan	Tabriz
14:00 DST+03:30	F. Hatami 71'	Report	M. Mohammadi 25'; E. Hajsafi 56'	Stadium: Tractor Stadium; Attendance: 5,000; Referee: Ashkan Khorshidi

25 December 2017 15	Naft Tehran	0 – 2	Tractor	Tehran
15:00 DST+03:30		Report	M. Sharifi 63'; M. Nouri 72'	Stadium: Takhti Stadium; Attendance: 700; Referee: Mehdi Seyedali

12 January 2017 16	Esteghlal Khuzestan	0 – 1	Tractor	Ahvaz
15:30 DST+03:30		Report	M. Sharifi 88'	Stadium: Ghadir Stadium; Attendance: 5,000

17 January 2017 17	Tractor	2 – 2	Sanat Naft	Tabriz
15:00 DST+03:30	M. Ebrahimi 8'; O. Alishah 62'	Report	Z. Niknafs 60'; A. Abdollahzadeh 86'	Stadium: Yadegar-e Emam Stadium; Attendance: NC; Referee: Mouood Bonyadifar

22 January 2017 18	Paykan	0 – 1	Tractor	Tehran
15:45 (DST+03:30)		Report	M. Ebrahimi 74'	Stadium: Shahr-e Qods Stadium; Attendance: 3,000; Referee: Bijan Heydari

27 January 2017 19	Tractor	0 – 0	Machine Sazi	Tabriz
15:00 DST+03:30		Report		Stadium: Yadegar-e Emam Stadium; Attendance: 2,000; Referee: Vahid Kazemi

5 February 2017 20	Persepolis	3 – 0	Tractor	Tehran
15:00 DST+03:30	M. Taremi 2'; R. Rezaeain 23'; V. Amiri 64'	Report		Stadium: Azadi Stadium; Attendance: 75,000; Referee: Bijan Heydari

11 February 2017 21	Tractor	4 – 1	Zob Ahan	Tabriz
15:00 DST+03:30	M. Iranpourian 6'; Edinho 31'; M. Ebrahimi 39'; M. Kiani 93'	Report	M. Rajabzadeh 35'	Stadium: Yadegar-e Emam Stadium; Attendance: 6,000; Referee: Mehdi Seyedali

24 February 2017 22	Siah Jamegan	1 – 2	Tractor	Mashhad
14:30 DST+03:30	H. Badamaki 27'	Report	M. Mehdizadeh 45'; F. Hatami 89'	Stadium: Samen Stadium; Attendance: 4,000; Referee: Ashkan Khorshidi

3 March 2017 23	Tractor	0 – 0	Saipa	Tabriz
15:15 DST+03:30		Report		Stadium: Yadegar-e Emam Stadium; Attendance: 15,000; Referee: Payam Heydari

10 March 2017 24	Foolad	0 – 0	Tractor	Ahvaz
16:30 DST+03:30		Report		Stadium: Ghadir Stadium; Attendance: 5,000; Referee: Reza Kermanshahi

1 April 2017 25	Tractor	1 – 1	Gostaresh Foulad	Tabriz
17:30 DST+04:30	M. Sharifi 16'	Report	R. Khaleghifar 55'	Stadium: Yadegar-e Emam Stadium; Attendance: 5,000; Referee: Ahmad Salehi

7 April 2017 26	Saba Qom	3 – 0	Tractor	Qom
17:15 DST+04:30	O. Jahanbakhsh 61', 95'; M. Majidi 99'	Report		Stadium: Yadegar Emam Stadium; Attendance: 5,000; Referee: Mohammad Reza Akbarian

14 April 2017 27	Padideh	0 – 1	Tractor	Mashhad
17:00 DST+04:30		Report	M. Ebrahimi 9'	Stadium: Samen Stadium; Attendance: 12,000; Referee: Mehdi Seyed Ali

20 April 2017 28	Tractor	1 – 0	Esteghlal	Tabriz
17:45 (UTC+04:30)	M. Ebrahimi 87'	Report		Stadium: Yadegar-e Emam Stadium; Attendance: 45,000; Referee: Ashkan Khorshidi

29 April 2017 29	Sepahan	2 – 0	Tractor	Isfahan
18:00 DST+04:30	M. Mohammadi 42'; F. Karimi 89'	Report		Stadium: Naghsh-e Jahan Stadium; Attendance: 10,000; Referee: Hamid Haj Malek

4 May 2017 30	Tractor	1 – 0	Naft Tehran	Tabriz
18:00 (UTC+04:30)	Edinho 93'	Report		Stadium: Yadegar-e Emam Stadium; Attendance: 12,000; Referee: Seyed Reza Mahdavi

=== Hazfi Cup ===
Win Draw Loss Postponed

30 September 2016 First Round	Tractor	2 – 0	Foulad Yasuj	Tabriz
15:00 DST+03:30	M. Iranpourian 47' (pen.); M. Ebrahimi 70'	Report		Stadium: Tractor Stadium; Attendance: 1,000

3 November 2016 2nd round	Malavan	0 – 1	Tractor	Bandar Anzali
14:00 DST+03:30		Report	M. Iranpourian 22'	Stadium: Takhti Stadium; Attendance: 10,000

18 November 2016 Last 16	Tractor	2 – 0	New Bargh Fars	Tabriz
13:30 DST+03:30	M. Nouri 39'; F. Hatami 62'	Report		Stadium: Tractor Stadium; Attendance: 4,000

20 December 2016 Quarter-finals	Naft Gachsaran	1 – 3	Tractor	Gachsaran
14:00 DST+03:30	H. Khanifar	Report	S. Goudarzi 18'; F. Hatami 29'; M. Ebrahimi 76'	Stadium: Shohadaye Naft Gachsaran Stadium; Attendance: 7,500; Referee: Reza Kermanshahi

31 December 2016 Semi-finals	Zob Ahan	2 – 3 (a.e.t.)	Tractor	Isfahan
14:30 DST+03:30	E. Pahlevan 45'; J. Bengtson 120' (pen.)	Report	F. Hatami 90'; M. Ebrahimi 92'; M. Nouri 121'	Stadium: Foolad Shahr Stadium; Attendance: 5,500; Referee: Seyed Hossein Zargar

11 May 2017 final	Naft Tehran	1 – 0	Tractor	Khorramshahr
21:00 DST+04:30	Shahbazzadeh 90'	Report		Stadium: Naft va Gaz Arvandan Stadium; Attendance: 8,521; Referee: Mehdi Seyedali

== Kit and sponsorship ==
Tractor is currently sponsored by the Hamrah-e Aval (Mobile Telecommunication Company) and also Javanane Khayer Foundation. They were previously sponsored by the Bank Sepah. In July 2014, the club signed a contract with Kelme, starting from 2014–15 season.

Years	Shirt sponsors
1970–2009	TMC
2007–2010	Bank Sepah
2009–2012	Hamrah-e Aval
2012–2014	Javanane Khayer Foundation
2013–	Aysan Tabriz
2014–	Hamrah-e Aval
2015-	Kosar Credit Cooperative

Years	Kit manufacturers
1970–1974	Umbro
1974–2005	Puma
2005–2010	Daei Sport
2010–2013	Uhlsport
2013–2014	Merooj
2014–	Kelme

== See also ==
- 2016–17 Iran Pro League
- 2016–17 Hazfi Cup
