= 2016–17 Persian Gulf Pro League =

16th season of Persian Gulf Pro League

Persian Gulf Pro League
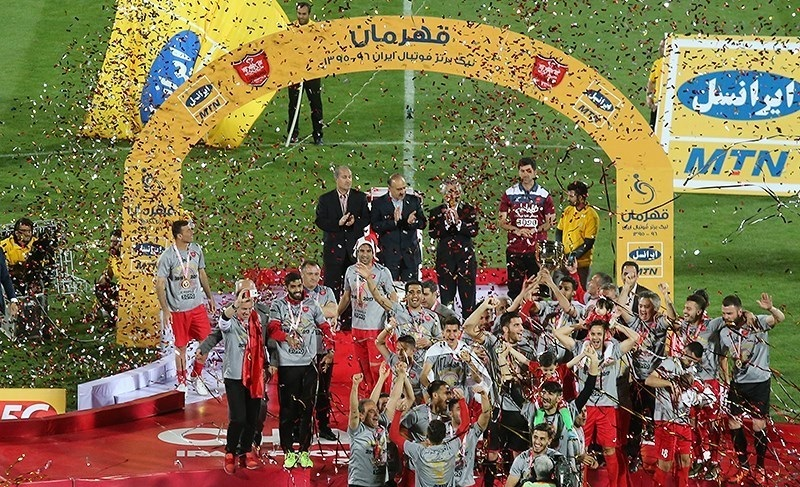
- Season: 2016–17
- Champions: Persepolis; 3rd Pro League title 10th Iranian title
- Relegated: Saba Qom; Machine Sazi
- Champions League: Persepolis; Esteghlal; Tractor Sazi; Zob Ahan
- Matches: 240
- Goals: 504 (2.1 per match)
- Top goalscorer: Mehdi Taremi (18 goals)
- Best goalkeeper: Alireza Beiranvand (17 clean sheets)
- Biggest home win: Persepolis 4–0 Padideh (19 April 2017)
- Biggest away win: Foolad 0–3 Persepolis (18 January 2017); Sanat Naft 0–3 Esteghlal (22 January 2017)
- Highest scoring: Paykan 4–3 Esteghlal Khuzestan (15 February 2017)
- Longest winning run: 6 matches Persepolis
- Longest unbeaten run: 13 matches Persepolis; Tractor Sazi
- Longest winless run: 19 matches Machine Sazi
- Longest losing run: 9 matches Machine Sazi
- Highest attendance: 80,000; Persepolis – Padideh (19 April 2017)
- Lowest attendance: 0 (spectator ban); Esteghlal – Naft Tehran (25 July 2016); Est. Khuzestan – Siah Jamegan (24 November 2016); Est. Khuzestan – Foolad (9 December 2016); Tractor Sazi – Sanat Naft (17 January 2017); Esteghlal – Est. Khuzestan (17 January 2017); Sanat Naft – Naft Tehran (3 February 2017); Sanat Naft – Paykan (3 March 2017)
- Total attendance: 1,884,144
- Average attendance: 8,086

The 2016–17 Persian Gulf Pro League (formerly known as Iran Pro League) was the 34th season of Iran's Football League and 16th as Persian Gulf Pro League since its establishment in 2001. Esteghlal Khuzestan were the defending champions. The season featured 13 teams from the 2015–16 Persian Gulf Pro League and three new teams promoted from the 2015–16 Azadegan League: Paykan as champions, Machine Sazi and Sanat Naft. The league started on 25 July 2016 and ended on 4 May 2017. Persepolis won the Pro League title for the third time in their history (total 10th Iranian title).

== Teams ==
=== Stadia and locations ===
Locations of clubs in 2016–17 Persian Gulf Pro League

Team	City	Venue	Capacity
Esteghlal	Tehran	Azadi	78,116
Esteghlal Khuzestan	Ahvaz	Ghadir	38,900
Foolad	Ahvaz	Ghadir	38,900
Gostaresh	Tabriz	Bonyan Diesel	12,000
Machine Sazi	Tabriz	Yadegar-e Emam	66,833
Naft Tehran	Tehran	Takhti Tehran	30,122
Padideh	Mashhad	Samen	35,000
Paykan	Tehran	Shahr-e Qods	25,000
Persepolis	Tehran	Azadi	78,116
Saba Qom	Qom	Yadegar-e Emam	10,610
Saipa	Tehran	Shahid Dastgerdi	8,250
Sanat Naft	Abadan	Takhti Abadan	10,000
Sepahan	Isfahan	Naghsh-e-Jahan	75,000
Siah Jamegan	Mashhad	Samen	35,000
Tractor Sazi	Tabriz	Yadegar-e Emam	66,833
Zob Ahan	Isfahan	Foolad Shahr	15,000

=== Personnel and kits ===
Note: Flags indicate national team as has been defined under FIFA eligibility rules. Players may hold more than one non-FIFA nationality.

Team	Manager	Captain	Kit manufacturer
Esteghlal	(Iran) Alireza Mansourian	(Iran) Mehdi Rahmati	(China) Li-Ning
Est. Khuzestan	(Iran) Sirous Pourmousavi	(Iran) Mohammad Tayyebi	(Iran) Start
Foolad	(Iran) Naeim Saadavi	(Iran) Mehrdad Jamaati	(Germany) Uhlsport
Gostaresh	(Iran) Faraz Kamalvand	(Iran) Morteza Asadi	(Iran) Merooj
Machine Sazi	(Iran) Farhad Kazemi	(Iran) Andranik Teymourian	(Iran) Merooj
Naft Tehran	(Iran) Ali Daei	(Iran) Alireza Ezzati	(Italy) Legea
Padideh	(Iran) Mohammad Reza Mohajeri	(Iran) Reza Nasehi	(Iran) Yousef Jame
Paykan	(Iran) Majid Jalali	(Iran) Rahman Ahmadi	(Iran) Yousef Jame
Persepolis	(Croatia) Branko Ivanković	(Iran) Jalal Hosseini	(Spain) Joma
Saba Qom	(Iran) Samad Marfavi	(Iran) Reza Enayati	(Iran) Merooj
Sanat Naft	(Iran) Firouz Karimi	(Iran) Hassan Houri	(Iran) Merooj
Saipa	(Iran) Hossein Faraki	(Iran) Ebrahim Sadeghi	(Italy) Givova
Sepahan	(Croatia) Zlatko Kranjčar	(Iran) Ehsan Hajsafi	(Germany) Uhlsport
Siah Jamegan	(Iran) Akbar Misaghian	(Iran) Meysam Hosseini	(Iran) Merooj
Tractor Sazi	(Iran) Amir Ghalenoei	(Iran) Mehdi Kiani	(Turkey) Fitcom
Zob Ahan	(Iran) Mojtaba Hosseini	(Iran) Mehdi Rajabzadeh	(Iran) Merooj

== Managerial changes ==
Team	Outgoing head coach	Manner of departure	Date of vacancy	Position in table	Incoming head coach	Date of appointment
Naft Tehran	(Iran) Alireza Mansourian	Contract expired	15 May 2016	Pre-season	(Iran) Ali Daei	5 July 2016
Foolad	(Croatia) Dragan Skočić	Contract expired	16 May 2016	Pre-season	(Iran) Naeim Saadavi	25 May 2016
Esteghlal Khuzestan	(Iran) Abdollah Veisi	Mutual contest	23 May 2016	Pre-season	(Iran) Sirous Pourmousavi	25 May 2016
Esteghlal	(Iran) Parviz Mazloumi	Sacked	1 June 2016	Pre-season	(Iran) Alireza Mansourian	1 June 2016
Saba Qom	(Iran) Ali Daei	Signed by Naft Tehran	3 July 2016	Pre-season	(Iran) Samad Marfavi	3 July 2016
Zob Ahan	(Iran) Yahya Golmohammadi	Resigned	24 September 2016	14th	(Iran) Mojtaba Hosseini	24 September 2016
Siah Jamegan	(Iran) Farhad Kazemi	Resigned	27 October 2016	13th	(Iran) Khodadad Azizi	28 October 2016
Machine Sazi	(Iran) Rasoul Khatibi	Resigned	8 December 2016	16th	(Iran) Farhad Kazemi	11 December 2016
Sanat Naft	(Iran) Nader Dastneshan	Sacked	5 January 2017	11th	(Iran) Firouz Karimi	5 January 2017
Siah Jamegan	(Iran) Khodadad Azizi	Resigned	25 February 2017	15th	(Iran) Akbar Misaghian	25 February 2017
Sepahan	(Iran) Abdollah Veisi	Sacked	16 March 2017	7th	(Croatia) Zlatko Kranjčar	17 March 2017

== Foreign players ==
The number of foreign players is restricted to four per Persian Gulf Pro League team, including a slot for a player from AFC countries. A team can use four foreign players on the field in each game, including at least one player from the AFC country.
In bold: Players that have been capped for their national team.

Club	Player 1	Player 2	Player 3	Asian Player	Former Player
Esteghlal	(Armenia) **Hrayr Mkoyan**	(Brazil) Róbson Januário	(Brazil) Leandro Padovani		
Esteghlal Khuzestan	(Cameroon) Aloys Nong				(Brazil) Rafael Roballo (Brazil) Deyvid Sacconi
Foolad	(Cameroon) **Mathias Chago**	(Cameroon) **Ernest Nfor**			
Gostaresh	(Brazil) Fernando	(Brazil) Magno Batista	(Brazil) Chimba		
Machine Sazi	(Brazil) Edson	(Georgia (country)) Kakhaber Kakashvili		(Uzbekistan) **Aziz Ibragimov**	(Spain) Manu
Naft Tehran	(Croatia) Igor Prahić				
Padideh	(Armenia) **Varazdat Haroyan**	(Ivory Coast) Drissa Diarrassouba	(Cameroon) David Wirikom		
Paykan	(Armenia) **Levon Hayrapetyan**	(Nigeria) Godwin Mensha	(France) Jérémy Manzorro	(Afghanistan) **Faysal Shayesteh**	(Brazil) Halisson
Persepolis	(Croatia) Božidar Radošević			(Australia) Antony Golec	(Ukraine) Volodymyr Pryyomov (Ukraine) Oleksiy Polyanskyi
Saba Qom					
Saipa	(Brazil) Júnior Lopes	(Montenegro) Bogdan Milić			(Brazil) Alessandro (Brazil) Reinaldo
Sanat Naft	(Brazil) Bruno Matos	(Iraq) **Ali Salah**	(Nigeria) Rasheed Alabi	(South Korea) Kim Gwi-hyeon	(Colombia) Danny Santoya
Sepahan	(Brazil) Lee Oliveira	(Mali) Moussa Coulibaly		(Uzbekistan) **Server Djeparov**	(Brazil) Pedro Henrique
Siah Jamegan	(Brazil) Andrey	(France) Goran Jerković			(Ivory Coast) **Moussa Traoré**
Tractor Sazi	(Brazil) Edinho			(Iraq) **Karrar Jassim**	
Zob Ahan	(Honduras) **Jerry Bengtson**	(Lebanon) **Rabih Ataya**		(Lebanon) **Ali Hamam**	

== League table ==
Pos	Team	Pld	W	D	L	GF	GA	GD	Pts	Qualification or relegation
1	Persepolis (C)	30	20	6	4	46	14	+32	66	Qualification for the 2018 AFC Champions League group stage
2	Esteghlal	30	16	9	5	45	27	+18	57	Qualification for the 2018 AFC Champions League group stage
3	Tractor Sazi	30	15	11	4	38	24	+14	56	Qualification for the 2018 AFC Champions League group stage
4	Zob Ahan	30	12	10	8	39	30	+9	46	Qualification for the 2018 AFC Champions League qualifying play-offs
5	Sepahan	30	12	9	9	38	34	+4	45	
6	Paykan	30	12	8	10	39	38	+1	44	
7	Est. Khuzestan	30	10	11	9	36	34	+2	41	
8	Gostaresh	30	7	17	6	26	24	+2	38	
9	Naft Tehran	30	8	12	10	31	34	−3	36	
10	Foolad	30	7	14	9	30	32	−2	35	
11	Padideh	30	8	10	12	28	36	−8	34	
12	Sanat Naft	30	8	9	13	24	34	−10	33	
13	Saipa	30	7	11	12	20	30	−10	32	
14	Siah Jamegan	30	6	12	12	24	35	−11	30	
15	Saba Qom (R)	30	6	10	14	22	33	−11	28	Relegation to the 2017–18 Azadegan League
16	Machine Sazi (R)	30	3	7	20	18	45	−27	16	Relegation to the 2017–18 Azadegan League

Updated to match(es) played on 4 May 2017. Source: IPL Stats, Soccerway
Rules for classification: 1) Points; 2) Goal difference; 3) Goals scored.
(C) Champions; (R) Relegated

== Results ==
Home \ Away	EST	ESK	FOL	GOS	MST	NAF	PAD	PAY	PRS	SAB	SAP	SNA	SEP	SJA	TRK	ZOB
Esteghlal		1–2	1–0	2–2	1–1	1–1	1–0	3–2	3–2	2–1	2–0	1–2	2–1	1–1	1–2	2–1
Est. Khuzestan	2–1		0–1	0–0	1–0	2–2	2–1	2–3	1–1	1–0	0–0	1–0	1–1	0–0	0–1	1–1
Foolad	1–1	1–3		2–2	1–2	4–2	1–0	1–2	0–3	2–0	2–2	3–0	1–1	0–0	0–0	0–2
Gostaresh	1–1	2–1	0–0		2–1	0–0	3–0	0–0	0–1	0–0	2–1	1–0	2–1	0–1	0–2	0–0
Machine Sazi	0–3	1–3	0–0	0–0		0–2	0–2	1–4	0–2	0–0	3–3	1–0	0–1	0–1	0–2	1–2
Naft Tehran	0–1	1–1	2–2	1–1	2–1		3–0	2–1	0–2	1–2	2–0	2–1	0–1	1–1	0–2	2–1
Padideh	1–2	0–0	0–1	3–2	1–0	0–0		0–0	1–2	1–0	0–1	3–3	1–1	1–1	0–1	1–1
Paykan	1–1	4–3	2–1	1–1	3–1	0–0	0–2		0–0	1–1	2–0	3–2	3–2	1–0	0–1	1–2
Persepolis	0–0	1–0	1–1	1–0	1–0	3–0	4–0	2–0		1–0	1–0	1–0	2–1	3–0	3–0	3–3
Saba Qom	0–2	1–2	0–0	0–0	1–1	0–1	2–3	1–0	0–2		1–0	0–0	0–1	2–1	3–0	1–1
Saipa	1–2	0–2	1–0	1–1	1–0	1–0	1–1	0–1	0–1	0–0		0–2	1–1	1–0	0–0	0–0
Sanat Naft	0–3	1–1	0–1	0–1	3–0	0–0	0–3	1–0	1–0	2–1	0–1		1–0	1–1	0–0	0–3
Sepahan	1–1	3–1	1–1	1–0	0–3	2–1	0–1	1–1	1–3	4–1	3–1	0–0		2–1	2–0	2–1
Siah Jamegan	0–1	2–1	1–1	1–1	1–0	2–2	1–1	1–2	1–0	2–2	0–2	0–1	1–1		1–2	2–1
Tractor Sazi	1–0	2–2	2–2	1–1	0–0	1–0	1–1	3–1	0–0	2–1	0–0	2–2	1–2	3–0		4–1
Zob Ahan	0–2	2–0	1–0	1–1	2–1	1–1	2–0	3–0	1–0	0–1	1–1	1–1	2–0	1–0	1–2	

Updated to match(es) played on 4 May 2017. Source: PersianLeague Stats
Legend: Blue = home team win; Yellow = draw; Red = away team win.

=== Positions by round ===
Team ╲ Round	1	2	3	4	5	6	7	8	9	10	11	12	13	14	15	16	17	18	19	20	21	22	23	24	25	26	27	28	29	30
Persepolis	3	3	1	1	1	2	2	1	1	1	2	1	1	1	1	1	1	1	1	1	1	1	1	1	1	1	1	1	1	1
Esteghlal	7	12	15	15	14	15	10	7	5	5	6	5	7	7	7	5	6	4	4	3	3	3	3	3	2	2	2	3	2	2
Tractor Sazi	5	7	3	2	2	1	1	2	2	2	1	2	2	2	2	2	2	2	2	2	2	2	2	2	3	3	3	2	3	3
Zob Ahan	13	12	7	6	8	9	14	10	11	8	5	4	3	3	3	3	3	3	3	4	4	4	4	4	4	4	4	4	5	4
Sepahan	15	6	2	4	6	3	4	9	6	6	7	10	8	8	8	7	4	5	5	6	9	10	8	7	5	5	5	5	4	5
Paykan	9	8	14	14	13	14	8	4	7	4	4	8	6	6	6	4	5	6	6	5	7	6	7	8	6	6	7	6	6	6
Est. Khuzestan	5	1	9	8	9	8	11	5	8	10	11	9	10	11	10	11	10	10	10	8	6	8	6	6	8	9	8	7	7	7
Gostaresh	9	10	13	13	15	16	16	12	10	13	13	12	12	9	8	9	7	7	7	7	5	7	9	9	9	10	10	9	9	8
Naft Tehran	7	15	6	5	3	4	3	3	3	3	3	3	4	4	4	8	9	8	8	9	8	5	5	5	7	8	6	8	8	9
Foolad	13	12	16	16	16	10	12	8	9	9	9	6	5	5	5	6	8	9	9	10	10	9	10	10	11	11	11	12	10	10
Padideh	3	3	11	11	11	12	13	15	15	11	8	11	11	12	12	12	12	12	13	13	13	12	11	11	10	7	9	10	11	11
Sanat Naft	9	10	5	3	4	5	5	6	4	7	10	7	9	10	11	10	11	11	11	12	12	13	13	13	12	12	12	11	12	12
Saipa	15	15	8	7	7	7	9	13	14	14	15	15	13	14	14	14	14	13	12	11	11	11	12	12	13	13	13	13	13	13
Siah Jamegan	1	2	10	9	5	6	6	11	13	12	12	13	14	13	13	13	13	14	14	14	15	15	15	15	15	15	15	15	15	14
Saba Qom	9	8	12	12	12	13	7	14	12	15	14	14	15	15	15	15	15	15	15	15	14	14	14	14	14	14	14	14	14	15
Machine Sazi	2	3	4	10	10	11	15	16	16	16	16	16	16	16	16	16	16	16	16	16	16	16	16	16	16	16	16	16	16	16

Leader and 2018 AFC Champions League Group stage
2018 AFC Champions League Group stage
2018 AFC Champions League Third qualifying round
Relegation to 2017–18 Azadegan League

Source: FIFA.com (in English)

== Clubs season-progress ==
Team ╲ Round	1	2	3	4	5	6	7	8	9	10	11	12	13	14	15	16	17	18	19	20	21	22	23	24	25	26	27	28	29	30
Persepolis	W	D	W	W	D	D	W	W	D	W	D	W	W	L	W	W	W	W	W	W	L	W	W	W	L	W	W	W	D	L
Esteghlal	D	L	L	D	D	D	W	W	W	D	D	W	L	W	D	W	L	W	W	W	W	W	D	W	W	D	W	L	W	W
Tractor Sazi	D	D	W	W	D	W	W	D	D	W	W	D	W	L	W	W	D	W	D	L	W	W	D	D	D	L	W	W	L	W
Zob Ahan	L	D	W	D	D	L	L	W	L	W	W	W	W	W	D	W	D	W	D	L	L	L	L	D	D	D	W	W	D	W
Sepahan	L	W	W	L	D	W	L	L	W	D	D	L	W	W	D	D	W	D	D	L	L	L	W	D	W	D	W	W	W	L
Paykan	D	D	L	D	D	D	W	W	D	W	D	L	W	W	W	D	L	L	L	W	L	W	L	L	W	L	L	W	W	W
Est. Khuzestan	D	W	L	D	D	D	L	W	D	L	D	W	L	L	W	L	W	D	D	W	W	L	W	L	D	L	D	W	D	W
Gostaresh	D	D	L	D	L	D	D	W	D	L	D	W	D	W	W	D	W	L	D	D	W	D	L	D	D	D	L	D	D	W
Naft Tehran	D	L	W	D	W	D	W	L	W	D	W	L	D	W	L	L	L	D	D	D	W	W	L	D	D	L	D	D	L	L
Foolad	L	D	L	D	D	W	D	W	D	D	D	W	W	W	L	D	L	L	D	L	W	D	D	D	L	D	D	L	W	L
Padideh	W	D	L	D	D	L	D	L	D	W	W	D	L	L	D	D	D	D	L	L	L	W	W	W	W	W	L	L	L	L
Sanat Naft	D	D	W	W	L	D	D	L	W	L	L	W	L	L	L	W	D	L	D	D	L	L	W	L	W	D	D	W	L	L
Saipa	L	D	W	D	D	D	L	D	L	D	L	L	W	L	D	L	D	W	W	W	L	D	D	L	L	W	D	L	L	W
Siah Jamegan	W	D	L	D	W	D	L	L	L	D	D	L	L	W	L	L	D	L	D	D	L	L	D	D	D	W	D	L	W	W
Saba Qom	D	D	D	L	D	D	W	L	D	L	L	L	L	L	L	L	W	D	L	W	W	D	D	D	L	W	L	L	W	L
Machine Sazi	W	D	D	L	D	L	L	L	L	L	L	L	L	L	D	D	L	D	D	L	W	L	L	W	L	L	L	L	L	L

Source: IranProLeague Stats
W = Win; D = Draw; L = Lose

== Season statistics ==
=== Top goalscorers ===
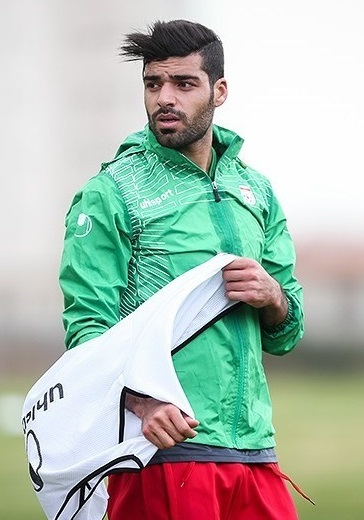
Mehdi Taremi

Rank	Player	Club	Goals
1	(Iran) Mehdi Taremi	Persepolis	18
2	(Iran) Sasan Ansari	Foolad	16
3	(Nigeria) Godwin Mensha	Paykan	15
4	(Iran) Mohammad Ghazi	Naft Tehran	12
5	(Iran) Hassan Beyt Saeed	Esteghlal Khuzestan	10
5	(Brazil) Luciano Pereira	Gostaresh Foolad	10
5	(Iran) Morteza Tabrizi	Zob Ahan	10
8	(Iran) Mehdi Rajabzadeh	Zob Ahan	9
9	(Honduras) Jerry Bengtson	Zob Ahan	8
9	(Iran) Masoud Hassanzadeh	Sepahan	8

Last updated: 4 May 2017
Source: Soccerway.com
Source: PersianLeague.com

=== Hat-tricks ===
Player	Club	Against	Result	Date
(Iran) Mehdi Rajabzadeh	Zob Ahan	Sanat Naft	3–0 (A)	25 November 2016
(Iran) Sasan Ansari	Foolad	Naft Tehran	4–2 (H)	1 December 2016
(Iran) Morteza Tabrizi	Zob Ahan	Paykan	3–0 (H)	2 December 2016

=== Clean sheets ===
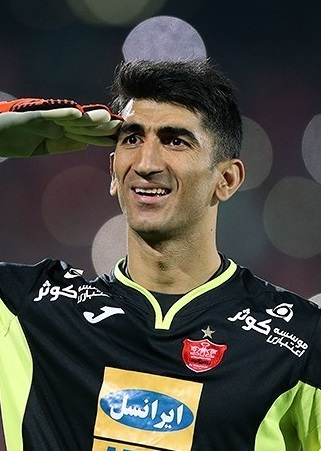
Alireza Beiranvand

Rank	Player	Club	Clean sheets
1	(Iran) Alireza Beiranvand	Persepolis	17
2	(Iran) Mohammadreza Akhbari	Tractor Sazi	11
2	(Iran) Mohammad Rashid Mazaheri	Zob Ahan	11
4	(Brazil) Fernando de Jesus	Gostaresh Foulad	8
5	(Iran) Hamed Lak	Saipa	7
5	(Iran) Mehdi Rahmati	Esteghlal	7
7	(Iran) Rahman Ahmadi	Paykan	6
7	(Iran) Vahid Talebloo	Foolad	6

Last Update: 4 May 2017
Source: varzesh3.com

== Attendances ==
=== Average home attendances ===
Pos	Team	Total	High	Low	Average	Change
1	Persepolis	841,000	80,000	9,500	48,567	+3.3%
2	Esteghlal	360,000	77,000	0	27,692	−8.3%
3	Tractor Sazi	150,700	45,000	0	10,764	+21.3%
4	Sepahan	127,350	38,000	700	8,490	+182.1%
5	Sanat Naft	72,400	10,000	0	5,569	+53.5%
6	Foolad	81,430	31,000	300	5,429	+33.7%
7	Siah Jamegan	62,350	24,000	150	4,157	−2.7%
8	Est. Khuzestan	47,120	30,000	0	3,625	−28.9%
9	Padideh	50,787	19,000	150	3,386	−13.0%
10	Saipa	36,501	16,500	100	2,433	−59.6%
11	Paykan	33,727	8,750	100	2,248	+505.9%
12	Zob Ahan	32,550	12,500	250	2,170	+3.8%
13	Saba Qom	32,800	13,000	120	2,187	−5.9%
14	Naft Tehran	31,222	17,000	50	2,081	+30.6%
15	Machine Sazi	20,935	9,500	30	1,396	−60.1%
16	Gostaresh	15,272	4,810	25	1,018	−56.5%
	League total	1,884,144	80,000	0	8,086	+0.5%

Updated to games played on 4 May 2017
Source: Iranleague.ir
Notes:
Matches with spectator bans are not included in average attendances
Machine Sazi, Paykan and Sanat Naft played last season in Azadegan League

=== Attendances by round ===
Team/Round	1	2	3	4	5	6	7	8	9	10	11	12	13	14	15	16	17	18	19	20	21	22	23	24	25	26	27	28	29	30	Average
Esteghlal	NC	A	55,000	A	15,000	A	35,000	A	25,000	A	10,000	A	55,000	6,000	A	A	NC	A	7,000	A	77,000	A	10,500	A	25,000	A	15,000	A	A	25,000	27,692
Esteghlal Khuzestan	A	10,000	A	500	A	A	300	A	30,000	A	NC	A	NC	A	300	1,300	A	1,500	A	500	1,000	A	300	A	1,000	A	300	A	120	A	3,625
Foolad	2,000	A	2,000	A	300	300	A	980	A	25,000	A	4,000	A	5,800	A	A	31,000	A	1,300	A	A	1,100	A	3,500	A	3,000	A	800	A	350	5,429
Gostaresh	1,200	A	4,050	A	526	A	300	110	A	3,500	A	150	A	50	A	A	200	A	120	A	100	A	A	100	A	4,810	A	31	A	25	1,018
Machine Sazi	A	2,050	A	5,000	A	700	A	315	A	300	A	A	250	A	260	1,300	A	200	A	450	A	100	A	330	A	150	9,500	A	30	A	1,396
Naft Tehran	A	322	200	A	1,000	A	400	A	300	A	50	A	200	A	3,700	7,000	A	A	200	A	150	A	17,000	A	300	A	250	A	150	A	2,081
Padideh	A	3,100	A	A	800	A	600	A	1,000	A	150	A	19,000	A	617	850	A	270	500	A	250	A	1,200	A	1,200	A	6,250	A	14,000	A	3,386
Paykan	A	100	A	8,360	A	500	A	3,000	A	A	8,750	A	700	A	1,232	750	A	4,200	A	873	A	975	A	1,000	1,500	A	850	A	937	A	2,248
Persepolis	A	50,000	A	50,000	A	75,000	A	16,000	A	65,000	A	25,000	A	A	43,000	50,000	A	30,000	A	78,000	A	67,000	A	45,000	A	45,000	A	80,000	9,500	A	48,567
Saba Qom	400	A	300	A	200	A	150	A	200	120	A	7,000	A	250	A	A	180	A	13,000	A	1,000	A	1,000	A	A	7,000	A	1,500	A	1,500	2,187
Saipa	16,500	A	A	220	A	400	A	2,300	A	455	A	1,000	A	173	A	A	473	100	A	1,000	A	400	A	12,000	A	300	A	680	A	500	2,433
Sanat Naft	A	4,000	A	8,000	A	8,000	A	A	5,000	A	5,500	A	4,500	A	4,000	2,050	A	10,000	A	NC	A	1,800	NC	A	6,550	A	9,000	A	4,000	A	5,569
Sepahan	2,250	A	3,500	A	1,200	A	11,900	A	700	A	3,000	A	4,000	A	38,000	A	12,000	A	5,000	A	3,500	A	7,000	A	10,000	A	10,000	A	15,300	A	8,490
Siah Jamegan	1,600	A	1,450	2,500	A	1,000	A	15,700	A	1,200	A	630	A	620	A	A	1,000	A	A	150	A	4,000	A	4,000	A	1,500	A	3,000	A	24,000	4,157
Tractor Sazi	5,000	A	7,200	A	7,000	A	6,900	A	5,000	A	4,500	7,000	A	6,000	A	A	NC	A	13,000	A	6,050	A	25,000	A	4,050	A	A	45,000	A	9,000	10,764
Zob Ahan	A	600	A	500	A	1,500	A	3,000	A	700	A	300	A	12,500	A	700	A	700	A	250	A	10,000	A	400	A	750	A	300	A	350	2,170
Total	28,950	70,672	73,700	75,080	26,026	87,400	55,550	41,405	67,200	96,275	31,950	45,080	83,650	31,393	91,109	63,950	44,853	46,970	40,120	81,223	89,050	85,375	62,000	66,330	49,600	62,510	51,150	131,311	44,037	60,725	1,884,144
Average	4,136	8,834	9,213	9,385	3,253	10,925	6,944	5,176	8,400	12,034	4,564	5,635	11,950	3,924	11,389	7,994	7,476	5,871	5,015	11,603	11,131	10,672	8,857	8,291	6,200	7,814	6,394	16,414	5,505	7,591	8,086

Notes:
Updated to games played on 4 May 2017. Source: Iranleague.ir
Matches with spectator bans are not included in average attendances
Machine Sazi played their matches against Esteghlal Khuzestan and Gostaresh at Bonyan Dizel
Machine Sazi played their matches against Paykan, Saipa, Sepahan, Tractor Sazi and Zob Ahan at Shahid Bakeri
Saipa played their match against Esteghlal at Azadi
Saipa played their match against Persepolis at Takhti Tehran
Sepahan played their matches against Esteghlal Khuzestan, Padideh, Paykan, Persepolis and Siah Jamegan at Foolad Shahr
Tractor Sazi played their matches against Esteghlal Khuzestan, Foolad, Padideh, Paykan, Persepolis, Saba Qom, Sepahan and Siah Jamegan at Shahid Bakeri

=== Highest attendances ===
Rank	Home team	Score	Away team	Attendance	Date	Week	Stadium
1	Persepolis	4–0	Padideh	80,000	19 April 2017	28	Azadi
2	Persepolis	3–0	Tractor Sazi	78,000	5 February 2017	20	Azadi
3	Esteghlal	3–2	Persepolis	77,000	12 February 2017	21	Azadi
4	Persepolis	0–0	Esteghlal	75,000	16 September 2016	6	Azadi
5	Persepolis	2–1	Sepahan	67,000	16 February 2017	22	Azadi
6	Persepolis	1–0	Sanat Naft	65,000	28 October 2016	10	Azadi
7	Esteghlal	1–2	Sanat Naft	55,000	5 August 2016	3	Azadi
7	Esteghlal	1–2	Tractor Sazi	55,000	9 December 2016	13	Azadi
9	Persepolis	1–1	Foolad	50,000	1 August 2016	2	Azadi
9	Persepolis	1–0	Saba Qom	50,000	11 August 2016	4	Azadi

Notes:
Updated to games played on 4 May 2017. Source: Iranleague.ir

== See also ==
- Azadegan League 2016–17
- Iran Football's 2nd Division 2016–17
- Iran Football's 3rd Division 2016–17
- Hazfi Cup 2016–17
- Iranian Super Cup
- Futsal Super League 2016–17
