= 2015–16 Persian Gulf Pro League =

15th season of Persian Gulf Pro League

Persian Gulf Pro League
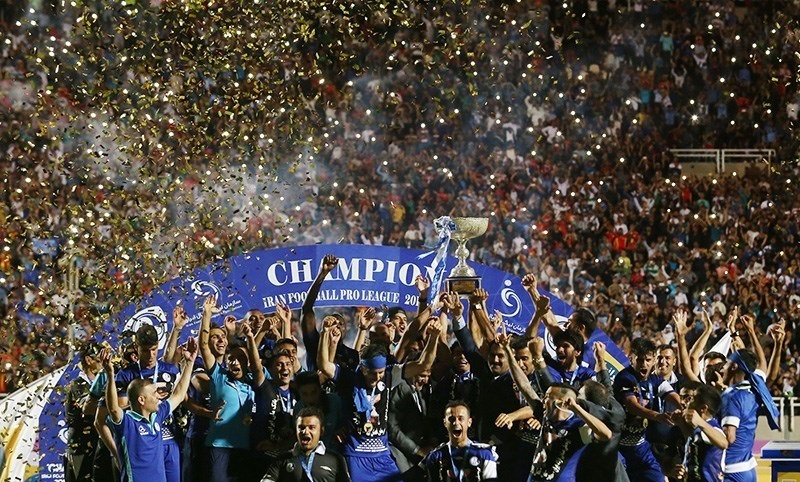
- Season: 2015–16
- Champions: Esteghlal Khuzestan; 1st Pro League title 1st Iranian title
- Relegated: Malavan; Rah Ahan; Esteghlal Ahvaz
- Champions League: Esteghlal Khuzestan; Persepolis; Esteghlal; Zob Ahan (Hazfi Cup champions)
- Matches: 240
- Goals: 502 (2.09 per match)
- Top goalscorer: Mehdi Taremi (16 goals)
- Best goalkeeper: Fernando de Jesus (17 clean sheets)
- Biggest home win: Rah Ahan 5–0 Est. Ahvaz (16 October 2015); Tractor Sazi 5–0 Est. Ahvaz (13 May 2016)
- Biggest away win: Foolad 0–3 Zob Ahan (15 September 2015); Sepahan 0–3 Esteghlal (26 October 2015); Est. Ahvaz 0–3 Saba Qom (27 December 2015)
- Highest scoring: Tractor Sazi 4–4 Zob Ahan (27 October 2015)
- Longest winning run: 5 matches Persepolis
- Longest unbeaten run: 21 matches Persepolis
- Longest winless run: 20 matches Est. Ahvaz
- Longest losing run: 6 matches Est. Ahvaz
- Highest attendance: 100,000; Persepolis – Esteghlal (15 April 2016)
- Lowest attendance: 0 (spectator ban); Foolad – Zob Ahan (15 September 2015); Tractor Sazi – Saipa (10 October 2015); Foolad – Naft Tehran (13 December 2015); Malavan – Naft Tehran (3 February 2016); Tractor Sazi – Foolad (10 March 2016); Persepolis – Siah Jamegan (3 April 2016); Est. Ahvaz – Saipa (8 May 2016)
- Total attendance: 1,875,293
- Average attendance: 8,048

The 2015–16 Persian Gulf Pro League (formerly known as Iran Pro League) was the 33rd season of Iran's Football League and 15th as Persian Gulf Pro League since its establishment in 2001. Sepahan were the defending champions. The season featured 14 teams from the 2014–15 Persian Gulf Cup and two new teams promoted from the 2014–15 Azadegan League: Siah Jamegan and Esteghlal Ahvaz. The league started on 30 July 2015 and ended on 13 May 2016. Esteghlal Khuzestan won the Pro League title for the first time in their history (total first Iranian title). Mehdi Taremi of Persepolis was the top scorer with 16 goals.

== Teams ==
=== Stadia and locations ===
Locations of clubs in 2015–16 Iran Pro League

Note: Table lists in alphabetical order

Team	City	Venue	Capacity
Esteghlal	Tehran	Azadi	95,225
Esteghlal Ahvaz	Ahvaz	Takhti Ahvaz	10,000
Esteghlal Khuzestan	Ahvaz	Ghadir	38,960
Foolad	Ahvaz	Ghadir	38,960
Gostaresh	Tabriz	Bonyan Dizel	12,000
Malavan	Anzali	Takhti Anzali	8,000
Naft Tehran	Tehran	Takhti Tehran	30,122
Padideh	Mashhad	Samen	35,000
Persepolis	Tehran	Azadi	95,225
Rah Ahan	Tehran	Shahr-e Qods	25,000
Saba Qom	Qom	Yadegar-e Emam	10,610
Saipa	Tehran	Shahid Dastgerdi	8,250
Sepahan	Isfahan	Foolad Shahr	15,000
Siah Jamegan	Mashhad	Samen	35,000
Tractor Sazi	Tabriz	Sahand	66,833
Zob Ahan	Isfahan	Foolad Shahr	15,000

=== Personnel and kits ===
Note: Flags indicate national team as has been defined under FIFA eligibility rules. Players may hold more than one non-FIFA nationality.

Team	Manager	Captain	Kit manufacturer
Esteghlal	(Iran) Parviz Mazloumi	(Iran) Mehdi Rahmati	(China) 361 Degrees
Est. Ahvaz	(Iran) Siavash Bakhtiarizadeh	(Iran) Adel Kolahkaj	(Italy) Givova
Est. Khuzestan	(Iran) Abdollah Veisi	(Iran) Mohammad Tayyebi	(Iran) Start
Foolad	(Croatia) Dragan Skočić	(Croatia) Leonard Mesarić	(Germany) Uhlsport
Gostaresh	(Iran) Faraz Kamalvand	(Iran) Morteza Asadi	(Iran) Merooj
Malavan	(Iran) Mohammad Ahmadzadeh	(Iran) Pejman Nouri	(Italy) Givova
Naft Tehran	(Iran) Alireza Mansourian	(Iran) Alireza Ezzati	(Germany) Uhlsport
Padideh	(Iran) Mohammad Reza Mohajeri	(Iran) Hossein Badamaki	(China) Peak
Persepolis	(Croatia) Branko Ivanković	(Iran) Alireza Nourmohammadi	(Germany) Uhlsport
Rah Ahan	(Greece) Ioannis Topalidis	(Iran) Bahador Abdi	(Italy) Givova
Saba Qom	(Iran) Ali Daei	(Iran) Abolfazl Ebrahimi	(Iran) Daei Sport
Saipa	(Iran) Saeid Rajabi (caretaker)	(Iran) Ebrahim Sadeghi	(Italy) Givova
Sepahan	(Iran) Ghasem Zaghinejad (interim)	(Iran) Moharram Navidkia	(Spain) Joma
Siah Jamegan	(Iran) Farhad Kazemi	(Iran) Reza Enayati	(Italy) Givova
Tractor Sazi	(Iran) Amir Ghalenoei	(Iran) Mehdi Kiani	(Spain) Kelme
Zob Ahan	(Iran) Yahya Golmohammadi	(Iran) Mehdi Rajabzadeh	(Italy) Legea

== Managerial changes ==
Team	Outgoing head coach	Manner of departure	Date of vacancy	Position in table	Incoming head coach	Date of appointment
Padideh	(Iran) Alireza Marzban	Resigned	5 July 2015	Pre-season	(Iran) Mohammad Reza Mohajeri	5 July 2015
Saba Qom	(Iran) Mehdi Tartar	Sacked	16 July 2015	Pre-season	(Iran) Ali Daei	16 July 2015
Siah Jamegan	(Iran) Rasoul Khatibi	Resigned	21 August 2015	15th	(Iran) Farhad Kazemi	28 September 2015
Rah Ahan	(Iran) Farhad Kazemi	Sacked	19 September 2015	13th	(Iran) Mehdi Tartar	21 September 2015
Esteghlal Ahvaz	(Iran) Siavash Bakhtiarizadeh	Sacked	16 October 2015	15th	(Iran) Ali Hanteh	17 October 2015
Sepahan	(Iran) Hossein Faraki	Mutual consent	1 November 2015	6th	(Croatia) Igor Štimac	12 November 2015
Tractor Sazi	(Portugal) Toni	Mutual consent	8 December 2015	9th	(Iran) Amir Ghalenoei	9 December 2015
Esteghlal Ahvaz	(Iran) Ali Hanteh	Mutual consent	26 December 2015	16th	(Iran) Siavash Bakhtiarizadeh	26 December 2015
Malavan	(Iran) Hamid Estili	Resigned	15 February 2016	12th	(Iran) Mohammad Ahmadzadeh	9 March 2016
Rah Ahan	(Iran) Mehdi Tartar	Sacked	19 February 2016	15th	(Greece) Ioannis Topalidis	22 February 2016
Sepahan	(Croatia) Igor Štimac	Resigned	20 April 2016	11th	(Iran) Abdollah Veisi	23 May 2016
Saipa	(Iran) Majid Jalali	Sacked	3 May 2016	10th	(Iran) Hossein Faraki	25 May 2016

== Foreign players ==
The number of foreign players is restricted to four per Iran Pro League team, including a slot for a player from AFC countries. A team can use four foreign players on the field in each game, including at least one player from the AFC country.
In bold: Players that have been capped for their national team.

Club	Player 1	Player 2	Player 3	Asian Player
Esteghlal	(Armenia) **Hrayr Mkoyan**	(Croatia) Pero Pejić	(Morocco) **Adil Chihi**	
Esteghlal Ahvaz	(Brazil) Luiz Fernando	(Bosnia and Herzegovina) Sandi Šahman		
Esteghlal Khuzestan	(Brazil) Fernando	(Mali) Moussa Coulibaly	(Equatorial Guinea) **Eduardo Ferreira**	(Timor-Leste) **Fellipe Bertoldo**
Foolad	(Croatia) Leonard Mesarić	(Cameroon) **Mathias Chago**	(Cameroon) **Dorge Kouemaha**	
Gostaresh	(Brazil) Magno Batista	(Brazil) Leo Pimenta	(Bulgaria) **Georgi Georgiev**	
Malavan				
Naft Tehran				
Padideh				
Persepolis	(Croatia) Luka Marić	(Costa Rica) **Michael Umaña**	(Honduras) **Jerry Bengtson**	(Uzbekistan) **Alexander Lobanov**
Rah Ahan	(Cyprus) **Athos Solomou**	(Finland) **Sebastian Strandvall**		
Saba Qom	(Brazil) Filipe Machado			
Saipa	(Bosnia and Herzegovina) Ratko Dujković			
Sepahan	(Brazil) Leandro Padovani	(Brazil) Luciano Pereira	(Bosnia and Herzegovina) **Senijad Ibričić**	(Uzbekistan) **Fozil Musaev**
Siah Jamegan	(Sweden) Kyle Konwea	(The Gambia) **Alagie Sosseh**	(England) Korede Aiyegbusi	
Tractor Sazi	(Brazil) Augusto	(Brazil) Carlos Cardoso	(Cameroon) Aloys Nong	
Zob Ahan	(Lebanon) **Ali Hamam**			(Lebanon) **Walid Ismail**

== League table ==
Pos	Team	Pld	W	D	L	GF	GA	GD	Pts	Qualification or relegation
1	Est. Khuzestan (C)	30	15	12	3	33	14	+19	57	Qualification for the 2017 AFC Champions League group stage
2	Persepolis	30	16	9	5	50	34	+16	57	Qualification for the 2017 AFC Champions League group stage
3	Esteghlal	30	13	13	4	43	28	+15	52	Qualification for the 2017 AFC Champions League qualifying play-offs
4	Tractor Sazi	30	13	12	5	43	27	+16	51	
5	Naft Tehran	30	13	10	7	30	21	+9	49	
6	Zob Ahan	30	11	13	6	38	26	+12	46	Qualification for the 2017 AFC Champions League group stage (Note: Zob Ahan secured qualification for the 2017 AFC Champions League through winning the 2015–16 Hazfi Cup.)
7	Saba Qom	30	9	15	6	30	24	+6	42	
8	Saipa	30	11	7	12	28	31	−3	40	
9	Gostaresh	30	10	9	11	36	32	+4	39	
10	Padideh	30	10	9	11	30	35	−5	39	
11	Sepahan	30	8	14	8	29	30	−1	38	
12	Foolad	30	9	8	13	26	37	−11	35	
13	Siah Jamegan	30	7	6	17	23	34	−11	27	
14	Malavan (R)	30	5	12	13	23	35	−12	27	Relegation to 2016–17 Azadegan League
15	Rah Ahan (R)	30	5	10	15	24	36	−12	25	Relegation to 2016–17 Azadegan League
16	Est. Ahvaz (R)	30	2	7	21	16	58	−42	13	Relegation to 2016–17 Azadegan League

Updated to match(es) played on 13 May 2016. Source: IPL Stats
Rules for classification: 1) points; 2) goal difference; 3) number of goals scored.
(C) Champions; (R) Relegated

== Results ==
Home \ Away	EST	ESA	ESK	FOL	GOS	MLV	NAF	PAD	PRS	RAH	SAB	SAP	SEP	SJA	TRK	ZOB
Esteghlal		1–1	1–1	3–0	2–1	2–0	2–1	0–0	1–1	3–3	1–0	1–1	0–0	3–1	2–3	0–2
Est. Ahvaz	1–2		0–1	1–2	0–2	1–1	0–1	2–3	0–2	1–0	0–3	1–2	1–1	1–0	0–2	1–1
Est. Khuzestan	1–1	4–0		0–1	1–0	0–0	0–0	3–0	2–1	3–1	1–1	1–0	1–1	2–1	1–1	2–0
Foolad	0–2	3–2	0–2		1–1	1–0	1–2	1–0	0–2	2–2	0–0	1–0	1–0	1–0	1–2	0–3
Gostaresh	0–2	4–0	0–0	1–1		3–1	1–1	4–1	2–4	3–2	2–0	0–1	1–0	1–0	1–3	4–3
Malavan	2–2	2–0	1–1	1–0	0–1		0–0	0–0	1–2	0–0	1–1	3–2	0–0	0–0	0–1	1–0
Naft Tehran	1–0	1–0	0–0	2–1	1–0	3–3		2–1	1–1	2–0	1–1	1–0	0–1	1–2	0–1	0–1
Padideh	1–1	2–0	0–1	1–1	2–1	1–0	1–2		2–2	1–0	0–0	1–0	1–1	1–0	1–0	0–1
Persepolis	4–2	1–0	2–0	1–0	1–0	2–0	0–2	2–2		2–1	1–1	1–2	2–2	3–2	1–1	1–2
Rah Ahan	0–1	5–0	0–1	1–1	0–0	0–1	0–1	3–1	0–2		2–1	0–2	1–0	0–0	0–0	1–1
Saba Qom	1–1	0–0	1–1	2–1	1–1	1–0	1–3	1–0	0–1	0–1		4–0	1–0	1–0	2–1	0–0
Saipa	1–2	4–1	0–1	1–0	0–0	2–1	0–0	2–1	1–1	1–0	0–0		0–2	1–1	0–1	0–1
Sepahan	0–3	1–1	1–0	1–1	2–1	2–2	2–1	0–2	4–2	0–0	2–2	1–2		1–1	0–0	1–1
Siah Jamegan	1–2	2–1	0–1	0–1	1–0	2–0	1–0	1–1	1–2	1–0	1–2	1–2	0–1		2–1	0–1
Tractor Sazi	0–0	5–0	0–0	3–2	1–1	4–2	0–0	1–2	0–1	1–1	1–1	2–0	2–1	0–0		4–4
Zob Ahan	0–0	0–0	0–1	1–1	0–0	1–0	0–0	3–1	2–2	4–0	1–1	1–1	0–1	3–1	1–2	

Updated to match(es) played on 13 May 2016. Source: IPL Stats
Legend: Blue = home team win; Yellow = draw; Red = away team win.

== Positions by round ==
Team ╲ Round	1	2	3	4	5	6	7	8	9	10	11	12	13	14	15	16	17	18	19	20	21	22	23	24	25	26	27	28	29	30
Est. Khuzestan	15	6	3	2	3	3	3	3	3	2	2	2	2	1	1	1	2	2	2	1	2	2	2	2	1	2	3	2	1	1
Persepolis	4	12	16	16	14	14	11	12	11	7	9	7	8	6	4	6	5	4	4	3	3	4	3	3	3	1	1	3	2	2
Esteghlal	1	1	4	3	2	1	1	1	1	1	1	1	1	2	2	2	1	1	1	2	1	1	1	1	2	3	2	1	3	3
Tractor Sazi	8	3	6	7	8	9	10	9	6	6	10	11	9	9	7	7	7	7	7	8	7	6	5	5	4	4	4	4	4	4
Naft Tehran	8	10	12	12	15	15	15	14	13	12	12	12	12	10	8	9	8	8	8	6	6	7	6	6	5	5	5	5	5	5
Zob Ahan	15	16	8	6	5	4	5	4	4	3	3	3	3	3	3	3	3	3	3	4	4	3	4	4	6	6	6	6	6	6
Saba Qom	8	10	8	13	9	10	8	8	5	5	4	6	4	4	5	4	6	6	6	7	8	9	9	10	8	8	8	7	7	7
Saipa	8	4	2	4	7	6	4	5	9	9	7	5	5	5	6	5	4	5	5	5	5	5	7	7	9	9	9	10	8	8
Gostaresh	8	14	15	10	4	8	7	7	10	8	5	8	6	8	10	10	10	9	9	9	9	8	8	8	7	7	7	8	9	9
Padideh	4	8	11	8	11	7	9	10	7	10	11	10	11	12	12	11	12	11	11	11	10	10	10	9	10	10	10	11	11	10
Sepahan	2	2	1	1	1	2	2	2	2	4	6	4	7	7	9	8	9	10	10	10	11	11	11	11	11	11	11	9	10	11
Foolad	4	8	13	14	16	16	16	16	16	15	15	15	14	14	14	14	13	13	13	13	13	12	12	12	12	12	12	12	12	12
Siah Jamegan	14	15	10	15	10	11	13	13	14	14	14	14	15	15	15	15	15	14	14	14	14	14	14	14	14	14	14	14	15	13
Malavan	2	7	5	5	6	5	6	6	8	11	8	9	10	11	11	12	11	12	12	12	12	13	13	13	13	13	13	13	13	14
Rah Ahan	4	13	14	9	12	13	12	11	12	13	13	13	13	13	13	13	14	15	15	15	15	15	15	15	15	15	15	15	14	15
Est. Ahvaz	8	5	7	11	13	12	14	15	15	16	16	16	16	16	16	16	16	16	16	16	16	16	16	16	16	16	16	16	16	16

Leader and 2017 AFC Champions League Group stage
2017 AFC Champions League Group stage
2017 AFC Champions League Third qualifying round
Relegation to 2016–17 Azadegan League

Source: FIFA.com (in English)

== Clubs season-progress ==
Team ╲ Round	1	2	3	4	5	6	7	8	9	10	11	12	13	14	15	16	17	18	19	20	21	22	23	24	25	26	27	28	29	30
Est. Khuzestan	L	W	W	W	D	D	W	D	D	W	D	W	W	W	W	D	L	L	W	D	D	W	D	D	W	D	D	W	W	W
Persepolis	D	L	L	L	W	L	W	D	W	W	D	W	D	W	W	D	W	D	D	W	D	D	W	W	W	W	W	L	W	W
Esteghlal	W	W	L	W	W	W	D	D	D	W	D	W	D	D	W	W	D	D	D	L	W	W	D	D	D	L	W	W	L	D
Tractor Sazi	D	W	D	L	D	D	L	W	W	D	L	D	W	D	W	W	D	D	L	D	W	D	W	W	W	D	L	W	W	W
Naft Tehran	D	D	L	D	L	W	D	D	W	W	D	L	D	W	W	L	W	L	D	W	W	L	W	W	W	D	L	W	W	D
Zob Ahan	L	L	W	W	D	W	D	W	D	D	W	D	W	W	L	W	D	D	D	D	D	W	D	L	L	D	D	W	W	L
Saba Qom	D	D	D	L	W	D	W	D	W	D	W	D	W	W	L	W	L	L	L	D	D	D	L	D	W	D	D	W	D	D
Saipa	D	W	W	L	L	W	W	L	L	D	W	W	D	W	L	W	W	L	L	W	D	L	D	L	L	D	L	L	W	D
Gostaresh	D	L	D	W	W	L	W	D	D	D	W	L	W	L	D	L	D	W	L	W	L	W	L	W	W	L	D	L	L	D
Padideh	D	D	L	W	L	W	D	D	W	L	L	W	L	L	D	D	L	W	W	D	D	W	D	W	L	W	L	L	L	W
Sepahan	W	W	W	D	W	D	L	D	D	L	D	W	L	D	D	D	D	D	L	L	L	D	W	D	D	D	W	W	L	L
Foolad	D	D	L	D	L	L	L	L	L	W	L	L	W	L	D	D	W	W	W	L	D	W	L	D	W	W	L	W	L	D
Siah Jamegan	L	L	W	L	W	L	L	D	L	L	L	D	L	L	D	L	W	W	W	D	D	L	L	L	L	D	W	L	L	W
Malavan	W	L	W	D	L	W	D	D	D	L	W	L	L	L	D	L	D	D	D	L	D	L	D	D	L	L	W	L	D	L
Rah Ahan	D	L	D	W	L	L	D	W	L	D	L	L	L	D	L	D	L	D	W	D	D	L	L	L	L	D	W	L	W	L
Est. Ahvaz	D	W	L	L	D	L	L	L	L	L	D	L	L	L	L	L	L	D	D	D	L	L	W	L	L	D	L	L	L	L

Source: IPL Stats
W = Win; D = Draw; L = Lose

== Season statistics ==
=== Top goalscorers ===
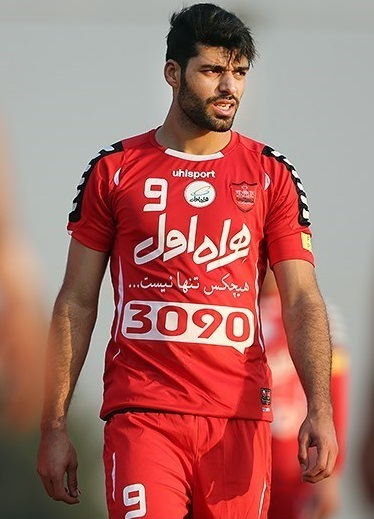
Mehdi Taremi

Rank	Player	Club	Goals
1	(Iran) Mehdi Taremi	Persepolis	16
2	(Iran) Mohammad Ebrahimi	Gostaresh Foulad	11
3	(Iran) Omid Ebrahimi	Esteghlal	10
3	(Iran) Mehrdad Mohammadi	Rah Ahan	10
5	(Iran) Sasan Ansari	Foolad	9
5	(Iran) Hassan Beyt Saeed	Esteghlal Khuzestan	9
7	(Iran) Jaber Ansari	Esteghlal	7
7	(Honduras) Jerry Bengtson	Persepolis	7
7	(Iran) Mohammad Iranpourian	Tractor Sazi	7
7	(Cameroon) Aloys Nong	Tractor Sazi	7
7	(Iran) Gholamreza Rezaei	Saipa	7
7	(Iran) Sajjad Shahbazzadeh	Esteghlal	7
7	(Iran) Morteza Tabrizi	Zob Ahan	7
7	(Iran) Mohsen Yousefi	Padideh	7
7	(Iran) Rahim Zohaivi	Esteghlal Khuzestan	7

Last updated: 13 May 2016
Source: Soccerway.com
Source: Iplstats.com

=== Hat-tricks ===
Player	Club	Against	Result	Date
(Iran) Mohammad Ebrahimi	Gostaresh	Zob Ahan	4–3	31 March 2016
(Iran) Sasan Ansari	Foolad	Est. Ahvaz	3–2	30 April 2016

=== Clean sheets ===
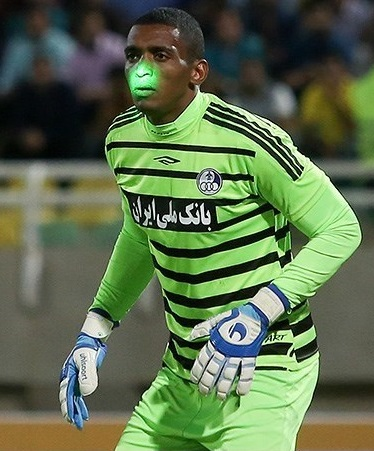
Fernando de Jesus

Rank	Player	Club	Clean sheets
1	(Brazil) Fernando de Jesus	Esteghlal Khuzestan	17
2	(Iran) Mohammad Rashid Mazaheri	Zob Ahan	13
3	(Iran) Mohammadreza Akhbari	Tractor Sazi	12
4	(Iran) Mehdi Rahmati	Esteghlal	11
5	(Iran) Alireza Beiranvand	Naft Tehran	9
6	(Iran) Hamed Lak	Saba Qom	8
6	(Iran) Sosha Makani	Persepolis	8
6	(Iran) Mojtaba Roshangar	Padideh	8
9	(Iran) Mohsen Forouzan	Rah Ahan	7
9	(Bulgaria) Georgi Georgiev	Gostaresh Foulad	7
11	(Iran) Hamed Fallahzadeh	Saipa	6
11	(Iran) Shahab Gordan	Sepahan	6
11	(Moldova) Serghei Pașcenco	Malavan	6

Last Update: 13 May 2016
Source: Iplstats.com

=== Scoring ===
- First goal of the season: Sajjad Shahbazzadeh for Esteghlal against Siah Jamegan (30 July 2015)
- Fastest goal of the season: 56 seconds, Jalaleddin Alimohammadi for Saba Qom against Naft Tehran (6 August 2015)
- Latest goal of the season: 96 minutes, Mohammad Ghazi for Saba Qom against Esteghlal Khuzestan (14 September 2015)
- Largest winning margin: 5 goals
  - Rah Ahan 5–0 Esteghlal Ahvaz (16 October 2015)
  - Tractor Sazi 5–0 Esteghlal Ahvaz (13 May 2016)
- Highest scoring game: 8 goals
  - Tractor Sazi 4–4 Zob Ahan (27 October 2015)
- Most goals scored in a match by a losing team: 3 goals
  - Gostaresh Foulad 4–3 Zob Ahan (31 March 2016)

== Awards ==
=== Team of the Season ===
Goalkeeper: Mohammad Rashid Mazaheri (Zob Ahan)
Defence: Sadegh Moharrami (Perspolis), Majid Hosseini (Esteghlal), Jalal Hosseini (Perspolis), Mohammad Ansari (Perspolis)
Midfield: Server Djeparov (Esteghlal), Omid Ebrahimi (Esteghlal), Mohammad Reza Hosseini (Zob Ahan)
Attack: Mehdi Torabi (Saipa), Ali Alipour (Perspolis), Vahid Amiri (Perspolis)

=== Player of the Season ===
Mehdi Torabi was awarded as the best player of the season. Ali Gholizadeh was also awarded as the best young player of the season.

=== Other awards ===
Branko Ivankovic was awarded as the best coach of the season. Mohammad Rashid Mazaheri won the best Goalkeeper award. Jalal Hosseini won the best Defender award. Omid Ebrahimi won the best Midfielder award. Ali Alipour won the best Striker award.

== Attendances ==
=== Average home attendances ===
Pos	Team	Total	High	Low	Average	Change
1	Persepolis	658,500	100,000	0	47,036	+198.3%
2	Esteghlal	453,000	90,000	2,500	30,200	+84.1%
3	Tractor Sazi	115,350	20,000	0	8,873	−67.7%
4	Saipa	90,299	77,000	70	6,020	+133.2%
5	Est. Khuzestan	76,460	35,000	200	5,097	+89.6%
6	Siah Jamegan	64,109	25,000	120	4,274	n/a
7	Padideh	58,367	22,000	200	3,891	−62.4%
8	Malavan	57,909	10,000	0	4,136	−9.1%
9	Rah Ahan	53,302	35,000	47	3,553	+123.5%
10	Foolad	52,800	18,000	0	4,062	−39.4%
11	Sepahan	45,150	12,500	250	3,010	−48.3%
12	Gostaresh	35,107	15,000	60	2,340	+16.1%
13	Saba Qom	34,840	15,000	100	2,323	+70.2%
14	Zob Ahan	31,370	8,000	200	2,091	+9.8%
15	Est. Ahvaz	24,820	10,800	0	1,773	n/a
16	Naft Tehran	23,910	12,200	70	1,594	−17.3%
	League total	1,875,293	100,000	0	8,048	+16.3%

Updated to games played on 13 May 2016
Source: Iranleague.ir
Notes:
Matches with spectator bans are not included in average attendances
Esteghlal Ahvaz and Siah Jamegan played last season in Azadegan League

=== Attendances by round ===
Team/Round	1	2	3	4	5	6	7	8	9	10	11	12	13	14	15	16	17	18	19	20	21	22	23	24	25	26	27	28	29	30	Average
Esteghlal	A	30,000	35,000	A	14,000	A	11,000	A	2,500	A	90,000	A	11,000	A	6,500	5,000	A	A	12,000	A	70,000	A	28,000	A	38,000	A	15,000	A	85,000	A	30,200
Esteghlal Ahvaz	A	1,100	A	6,000	A	A	370	A	200	A	500	A	1,500	A	500	600	A	200	A	550	800	A	200	A	1,500	A	10,800	A	NC	A	1,773
Esteghlal Khuzestan	A	6,000	A	300	A	200	A	350	A	210	A	450	A	250	A	2,000	A	5,000	A	5,000	A	1,100	A	17,000	A	3,250	A	350	A	35,000	5,097
Foolad	3,100	A	2,000	A	13,000	NC	A	1,200	A	400	A	18,000	A	NC	A	A	200	A	6,000	A	A	4,000	A	2,500	A	2,000	A	350	A	50	4,062
Gostaresh	A	6,500	A	520	A	2,000	A	214	A	A	60	A	650	A	225	100	A	186	A	528	A	624	A	2,000	2,500	A	4,000	A	15,000	A	2,340
Malavan	4,656	A	4,200	A	1,600	A	2,832	A	5,000	A	700	A	5,000	A	1,200	A	5,300	A	NC	A	2,000	A	3,200	A	10,000	A	5,000	A	7,221	A	4,136
Naft Tehran	A	500	A	990	A	100	A	A	200	A	200	A	12,200	A	200	1,200	A	100	A	7,650	A	130	70	A	100	A	200	A	70	A	1,594
Padideh	A	2,500	A	5,000	A	3,000	A	22,000	A	550	A	700	A	A	1,500	18,000	A	1,500	A	2,000	A	351	A	230	A	250	A	200	586	A	3,891
Persepolis	18,000	A	A	25,000	A	11,000	A	35,000	A	9,000	A	9,000	A	4,500	A	A	40,000	77,000	A	80,000	A	80,000	A	NC	A	100,000	A	80,000	A	90,000	47,036
Rah Ahan	A	525	A	1,000	A	500	A	250	A	250	A	A	500	A	11,800	200	A	2,500	A	300	A	35,000	A	47	A	250	123	A	57	A	3,553
Saba Qom	890	A	200	A	1,500	A	4,000	A	350	A	2,500	2,500	A	200	A	A	1,000	A	100	A	1,850	A	15,000	A	500	A	A	250	A	4,000	2,323
Saipa	250	A	300	A	500	A	300	300	A	350	A	500	A	210	A	A	289	A	70	A	77,000	A	A	950	A	200	A	9,000	A	80	6,020
Sepahan	2,200	A	12,500	3,500	A	3,500	A	1,500	A	8,500	A	2,200	A	800	A	A	3,500	A	A	3,500	A	600	A	1,400	A	500	A	700	A	250	3,010
Siah Jamegan	25,000	A	2,000	A	1,500	A	1,830	A	18,000	A	120	A	450	200	A	A	268	A	900	A	3,580	A	600	A	411	A	1,250	A	A	8,000	4,274
Tractor Sazi	20,000	A	8,200	A	7,000	A	20,000	A	NC	2,500	A	9,500	A	7,000	A	A	1,350	A	5,000	A	10,000	A	NC	A	A	10,800	A	2,000	A	12,000	8,873
Zob Ahan	A	6,000	A	A	1,500	A	800	A	400	A	520	A	500	A	1,900	350	A	6,500	8,000	A	1,000	A	200	A	2,300	A	1,000	A	400	A	2,091
Total	74,096	53,125	64,400	42,310	40,600	20,300	41,132	60,814	26,650	21,760	94,600	42,850	31,800	13,160	23,825	27,450	51,907	92,986	32,070	99,528	166,230	121,805	47,270	24,127	55,311	117,250	37,373	92,850	108,334	149,380	1,875,293
Average	9,262	6,641	8,050	5,289	5,075	2,900	5,142	7,602	3,807	2,720	11,825	5,356	3,975	1,880	2,978	3,431	6,488	11,623	4,581	12,441	20,779	15,226	6,753	3,447	6,914	14,656	4,672	11,606	15,476	18,673	8,048

Notes:
Updated to games played on 13 May 2016. Source: Iranleague.ir
Matches with spectator bans are not included in average attendances
Esteghlal Ahvaz played their matches against Esteghlal and Siah Jamegan at Ghadir
Foolad played their match against Gostaresh at Takhti Ahvaz
Gostaresh played their matches against Persepolis and Tractor Sazi at Sahand
Rah Ahan played their match against Esteghlal at Azadi
Saipa played their match against Esteghlal at Takhti Tehran
Saipa played their match against Persepolis at Azadi

=== Highest attendances ===
Rank	Home team	Score	Away team	Attendance	Date	Week	Stadium
1	Persepolis	4–2	Esteghlal	100,000	15 April 2016	26	Azadi
2	Esteghlal	1–1	Persepolis	90,000	30 October 2015	11	Azadi
2	Persepolis	2–1	Rah Ahan	90,000	13 May 2016	30	Azadi
4	Esteghlal	2–3	Tractor Sazi	85,000	8 May 2016	29	Azadi
5	Persepolis	1–0	Foolad	80,000	12 February 2016	20	Azadi
5	Persepolis	1–1	Tractor Sazi	80,000	6 March 2016	22	Azadi
5	Persepolis	0–2	Naft Tehran	80,000	28 April 2016	28	Azadi
8	Persepolis	2–2	Sepahan	77,000	2 February 2016	18	Azadi
8	Saipa	1–1	Persepolis	77,000	18 February 2016	21	Azadi
10	Esteghlal	2–1	Gostaresh	70,000	19 February 2016	21	Azadi

Notes:
Updated to games played on 13 May 2016. Source: Iranleague.ir

== See also ==
- 2015–16 Azadegan League
- 2015–16 Iran Football's 2nd Division
- 2015–16 Iran Football's 3rd Division
- 2015–16 Hazfi Cup
- Iranian Super Cup
- 2015–16 Iranian Futsal Super League
