= Shahram Goudarzi =

Iranian footballer

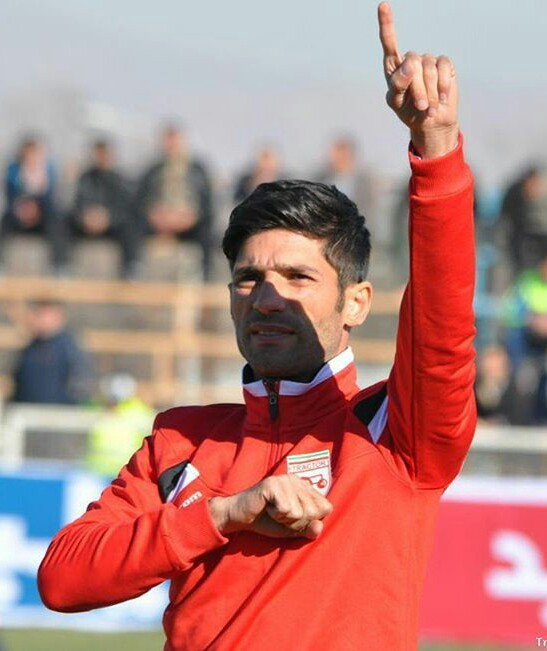
- Goudarzi with Tractor in 2017

Personal information
- Date of birth: 4 April 1987 (age 39)
- Place of birth: Mamasani, Iran
- Height: 1.76 m (5 ft 9 in)
- Position: Forward

Youth career
- Bargh Shiraz

Senior career*
| Years | Team | Apps | (Gls) |
| 2005–2008 | Bargh Shiraz | 54 | (7) |
| 2008–2010 | Fajr Sepasi | 61 | (9) |
| 2010–2012 | Shahrdari Tabriz | 55 | (4) |
| 2012–2014 | Mes Kerman | 38 | (4) |
| 2014–2015 | Fajr Sepasi | 20 | (8) |
| 2015–2016 | Gostaresh Foulad | 26 | (5) |
| 2016–2018 | Tractor | 31 | (0) |
| 2018–2020 | Pars Jonoubi | 62 | (1) |
| 2020–2021 | Shahin Bushehr | 5 | (0) |
| 2021 | Padideh | 2 | (0) |
| 2021–2022 | Fajr Sepasi | 21 | (0) |

International career
| 2006 | Iran U20 | 3 | (1) |
| 2007 | Iran U23 | 3 | (1) |
- * Club domestic league appearances and goals

Shahram Goudarzi (Persian: شهرام گودرزی; born 4 April 1987) is an Iranian former football player.

== Club career ==
He was scouted by Bargh Shiraz and played for them from 2005 to 2008. In June 2008 he join rival team Fajr Sepasi.

=== Club Career Statistics ===
Last Update 17 August 2012

| Club performance | | | League | | Cup | | Continental | | Total | |
| Season | Club | League | Apps | Goals | Apps | Goals | Apps | Goals | Apps | Goals |
| Iran | | | League | | Hazfi Cup | | Asia | | Total | |
|---|---|---|---|---|---|---|---|---|---|---|
| 2005–06 | Bargh | Pro League | 2 | 0 | | | - | - | | |
| 2006–07 | Bargh | Pro League | 22 | 3 | | | - | - | | |
| 2007–08 | Bargh | Pro League | 29 | 4 | 2 | 1 | - | - | 31 | 5 |
| 2008–09 | Moghavemat | Pro League | 29 | 5 | | 0 | - | - | | 5 |
| 2009–10 | Moghavemat | Pro League | 32 | 4 | | 0 | - | - | | 4 |
| 2010–11 | Shahrdari Tabriz | Pro League | 28 | 3 | | | - | - | | |
| 2011–12 | Shahrdari Tabriz | Pro League | 27 | 1 | | | - | - | | |
| 2012–13 | Mes Kerman | Pro League | 23 | 2 | 0 | 0 | - | - | 23 | 2 |
| 2013–14 | Mes Kerman | Pro League | 15 | 2 | 0 | 0 | - | - | 15 | 2 |
| 2014–15 | Fajr Sepasi | Division 1 | 20 | 8 | 0 | 0 | - | - | 20 | 8 |
| 2015–16 | Gostaresh | Pro League | 11 | 2 | 0 | 0 | - | - | 11 | 2 |
| Career total | | | 238 | 34 | | | 0 | 0 | | |

- Assist Goals

| Season | Team | Assists |
|---|---|---|
| 06–07 | Bargh | 1 |
| 07–08 | Bargh | 3 |
| 09–10 | Moghavemat | 3 |
| 10–11 | Shahrdari Tabriz | 0 |

== International career ==
He is a former member of Iran national under-23 football team. He also has played for Iran national under-20 football team in AFC Youth Championship 2006, scoring the game-tying goal in the opening game that Iran went on to win 3–1.
