= ISIRI 13139 =

ISIRI 13139 is a standard published by the Institute of Standards and Industrial Research of Iran (ISIRI) in 2011 based on Directive 2009/61/EC. It defines "Installation of lighting and light-signalling devices on wheeled agricultural and forestry tractors".

== Related sources ==
Other related sources are as follows:

- Directive 2003/37/EC of 26 May 2003 on type approval of agricultural or forestry tractors, their trailers and interchangeable towed machinery, together with their systems, components and separate technical units and repealing Directive 74/150/EEC.
- ISO R 1724: 1970- Electrical connections for vehicles with 6 or 12 volt electrical systems applying more specifically to private motor cars and lightweight trailers or caravans.
- ISO R 1185: 1970- Electrical connections between towing and towed vehicles having 24 volt electrical systems used for international commercial transport purposes.

== See also ==
- Iran Tractor Manufacturing Company
