= Mehdi Kiani (footballer, born 1987) =

Iranian footballer

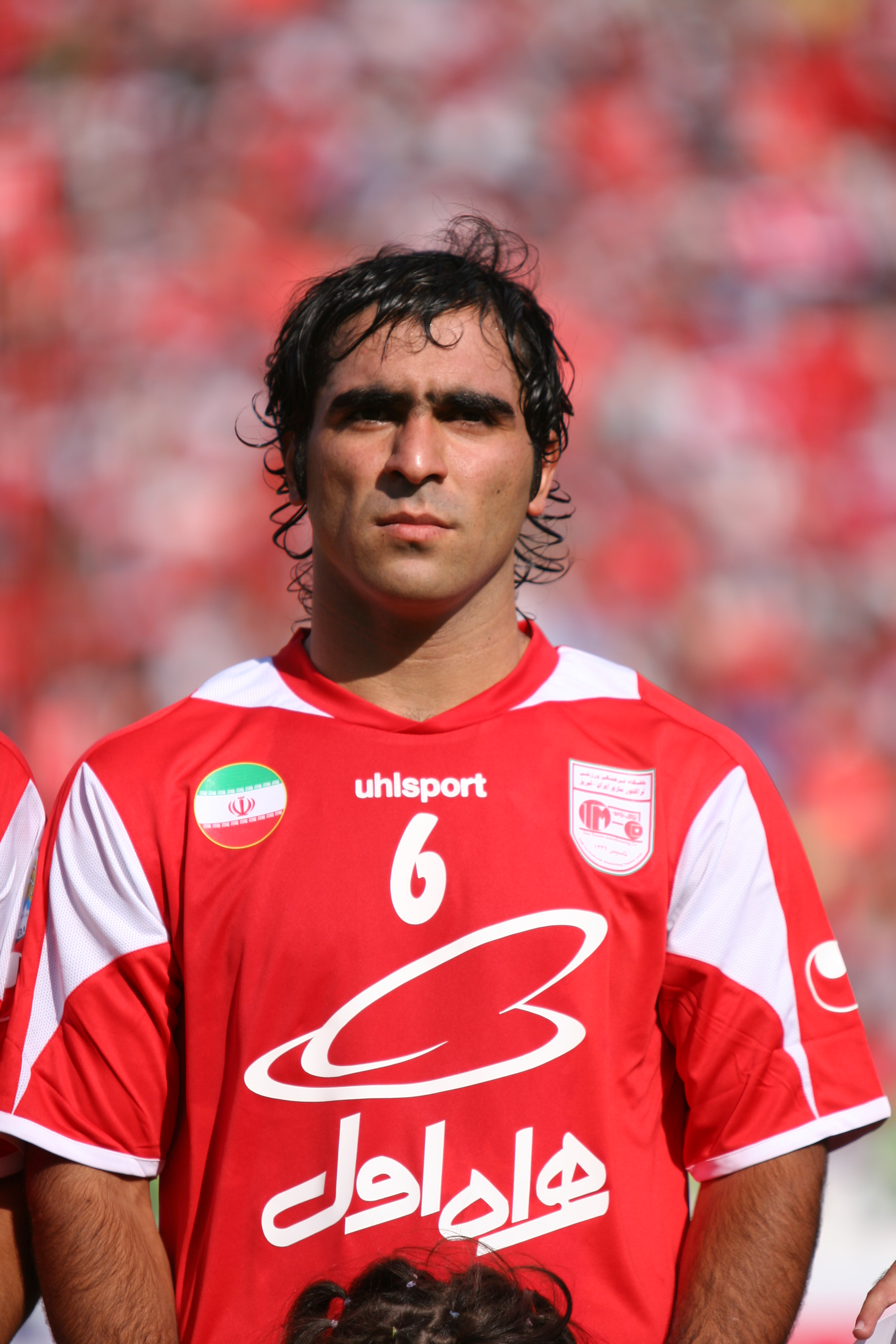
- Kiani playing for Tractor in 2009

Personal information
- Date of birth: 10 January 1987 (age 39)
- Place of birth: Malusan, Nahavand, Iran
- Height: 1.74 m (5 ft 8 1/2 in)
- Position: Defensive midfielder

Team information
- Current team: Mes Kerman
- Number: 4

Youth career
- Esteghlal Jonoub
- 2005–2008: Saba Battery

Senior career*
Years	Team	Apps	(Gls)
2008–2015	Tractor	166	(4)
2015–2016	Gostaresh Foulad	14	(1)
2016–2018	Tractor	64	(4)
2018–2021	Sepahan	61	(0)
2021–2022	Mes Rafsanjan	19	(0)
2022–2023	Tractor	27	(0)
2023–2024	Kheybar	32	(1)
2025	Mes Kerman	12	(0)
2025-2026	Be'sat	19	(0)
- * Club domestic league appearances and goals as of 29 April 2025

Mehdi Kiani (Persian: مهدی کیانی; born 10 January 1987) is an Iranian football midfielder who plays for Mes Kerman in the Azadegan League.

== Club career ==
He started his professional career with Tractor in summer 2008. He played seven seasons and 171 games before leaving the club and signing for fellow Tabrizi club Gostaresh Foolad.

=== Club career statistics ===
As of 3 September 2019

Club performance			League		Cup		Continental		Total	
Season	Club	League	Apps	Goals	Apps	Goals	Apps	Goals	Apps	Goals
Iran			League		Hazfi Cup		Asia		Total	
2008–09	Tractor	Azadegan League	20	2	0	0	-	-	20	2
2009–10	Tractor	Iran Pro League	32	0	0	0	-	-	32	0
2010–11	Tractor	Iran Pro League	31	0	1	0	-	-	32	0
2011–12	Tractor	Iran Pro League	16	0	0	0	-	-	16	1
2012–13	Tractor	Iran Pro League	32	1	1	0	6	0	38	1
2013–14	Tractor	Iran Pro League	26	2	1	0	4	0	31	2
2014–15	Tractor	Iran Pro League	27	1	1	0	5	1	33	2
2015–16	Gostaresh Foolad	Iran Pro League	14	1	1	0	-	-	15	1
2015–16	Tractor	Iran Pro League	15	0	0	0	7	0	22	0
2016–17	Tractor	Iran Pro League	27	2	6	0	-	-	33	2
2017–18	Tractor	Iran Pro League	22	2	2	0	6	0	30	2
2018–19	Sepahan	Iran Pro League	29	0	4	0	-	-	33	0
2019–20	Sepahan	Iran Pro League	18	0	2	1	2	0	22	1
Career total			218	11	10	1	15	1	243	13

- Assist goals

Season	Team	Assists
10–11	Tractor	0
11–12	Tractor	0
12–13	Tractor	1
13–14	Tractor	0
14–15	Tractor	0

== Honours ==
=== Club ===
Tractor

- Iran Pro League : 2011–12 Runner up, 2012–13 Runner up, 2014–15 Runner up
- Azadegan League (1) : 2008–09
- Hazfi Cup (1) : 2013–14

=== Individual ===
- Persian Gulf Pro League Best Midfielder of the Year : 2018–19
