= Mohammad Ebrahimi (footballer, born 1984) =

Iranian footballer

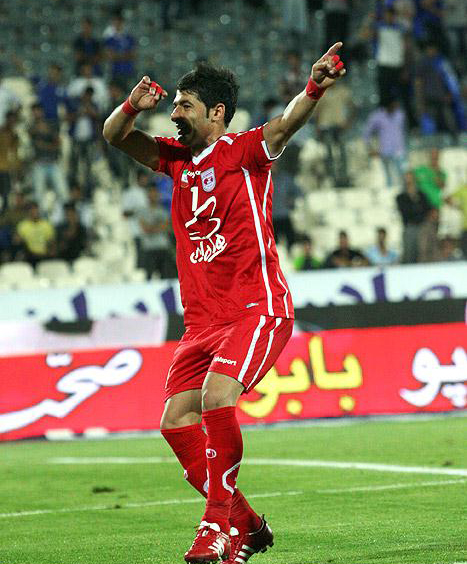

Personal information
- Full name: Mohammad Hassan Ebrahimi
- Date of birth: 1 November 1986 (age 39)
- Place of birth: Kazerun, Iran
- Height: 1.69 m (5 ft 7 in)
- Position: Forward

Youth career
- 2003–2008: Shohada Kazerun

Senior career*
Years	Team	Apps	(Gls)
2008–2009	Payam Mokhaberat	22	(12)
2009–2014	Tractor	145	(24)
2014–2016	Gostaresh Foulad	42	(13)
2016–2018	Tractor	51	(6)
2018	Oxin Alborz	14	(5)
2019	Sepahan	2	(0)
2019–2020	Pars Jonoubi	20	(0)
2020–2021	Shahin Bushehr	15	(4)
2021	Machine Sazi	5	(1)

International career
2012	Iran	4	(0)
- * Club domestic league appearances and goals

Mohammad Hassan Ebrahimi (Persian: محمد حسن ابراهیمی; born 1 November 1986) is an Iranian former footballer who played as a forward.

== Club career ==
Ebrahimi joined Tractor after spending the previous season at Mokhaberat Shiraz in the Azadegan League. Ebrahimi joined Gostaresh Foolad in December 2014 in exchange for Mehrdad Bayrami. Ebrahimi returned to Tractor in the summer of 2016.

=== Club career statistics ===
As of 26 October 2014

Club performance			League		Cup		Continental		Total	
Season	Club	League	Apps	Goals	Apps	Goals	Apps	Goals	Apps	Goals
Iran			League		Hazfi Cup		Asia		Total	
2008–09	Mokhaberat Shiraz	Azadegan League	22	12	1	0	–	–	23	12
2009–10	Tractor	Pro League	32	10	0	0	–	–	32	9
2010–11	Tractor	Pro League	32	4	2	1	–	–	34	5
2011–12	Tractor	Pro League	30	6	1	0	–	–	31	6
2012–13	Tractor	Pro League	28	3	1	0	4	0	33	3
2013–14	Tractor	Pro League	15	1	0	0	2	0	17	1
2014–15	Tractor	Pro League	8	0	2	0	0	0	10	0
Total	(Tractor)		145	24	6	1	6	0	157	25
2014–15	Gostaresh Foulad	Pro League	14	2	0	0	–	–	14	2
2015–16	Gostaresh Foulad	Pro League	28	11	2	1	–	–	30	12
Total	(Gostaresh Foulad)		42	13	2	1	0	0	44	14
2016–17	Tractor	Pro League	30	6	4	2	0	0	0	0
2017–18	Tractor	Pro League	23	0	2	0	5	0	0	0
Total	(Tractor)		53	6	6	2	5	0	64	8
2018–19	Oxin Alborz	Azadegan League	13	5	0	0	–	–	0	0
2018–19	Sepahan	Iran Pro League	2	0	0	0	0	0	2	0
2019–20	Pars Jam	Iran Pro League	21	0	0	0	0	0	0	0
Career total			298	60	15	4	11	0	324	64

- Assist Goals

Season	Team	Assists
2009–10	Tractor	2
2010–11	Tractor	0
2011–12	Tractor	1
2012–13	Tractor	1
2013–14	Tractor	0
2014–15	Tractor	0
2014–15	Gostaresh Foulad	3
2015–16	Gostaresh Foulad	6

== International career ==
He made his debut against Albania in April 2012 under Carlos Queiroz.

== Honours ==
Tractor

- Persian Gulf Pro League runner-up: 2011–12, 2012–13, 2014–15
- Hazfi Cup: 2013–14; runner-up: 2016–17

Individual'

- Persian Gulf Pro League Team of the Year: 2015-16
