= Fernando (footballer, born 1984) =

Brazilian footballer

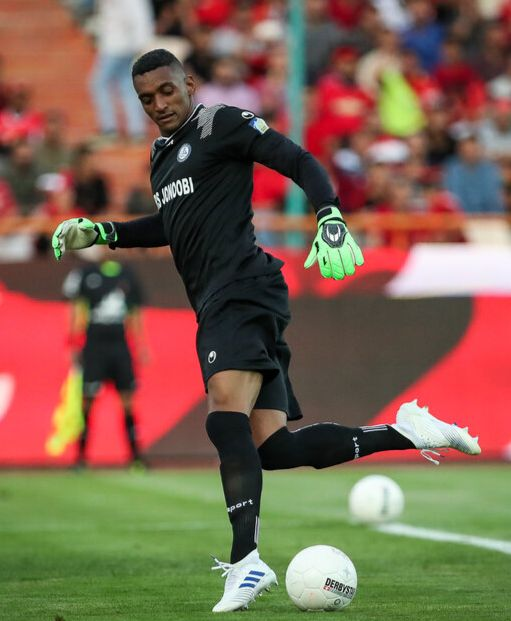
- Fernando with Pars Jonoubi

Personal information
- Full name: Fernando de Jesus Ribeiro
- Date of birth: 7 July 1984 (age 42)
- Place of birth: Rio de Janeiro, Brazil
- Height: 1.89 m (6 ft 2 1/2 in)
- Position: Goalkeeper

Team information
- Current team: America-RJ

Senior career*
Years	Team	Apps	(Gls)
2007–2008	São Cristóvão		
2007–2008	→ America-RJ (loan)		
2009–2013	Duque de Caxias	86	(0)
2009	→ Bréscia (loan)		
2014–2015	Macaé	28	(0)
2015–2016	Esteghlal Khuzestan	30	(0)
2016–2018	Gostaresh Foolad	53	(0)
2018–2019	Machine Sazi	28	(0)
2019–2020	Pars Jonoubi	14	(0)
2021	America-RJ		
2022–2023	Boavista RJ	18	(0)
2023–	America-RJ		
- * Club domestic league appearances and goals as of 8 March 2023

Fernando de Jesus Ribeiro (born 7 July 1984), more commonly known as Fernando is a Brazilian football goalkeeper who plays for America-RJ.

== Club career ==
=== Esteghlal Khuzestan ===
Fernando signed with Persian Gulf Pro League club Esteghlal Khuzestan in the summer transfer window of 2015. He impressed in the first half of the 2015–16 season, keeping the most clean sheets in the first 15 games of the season. On 13 May 2016, with the help of several saves from Fernando, Esteghlal Khuzestan won their last game of the season against Zob Ahan and became the champions of the Persian Gulf Pro League for the first time in their history.

=== Gostaresh Foolad ===
Fernando joined Tabrizi side Gostaresh Foolad in the summer of 2016 after being named goalkeeper of the season in the Persian Gulf Pro League.

== Honours ==
Esteghlal Khuzestan

- Persian Gulf Pro League (1): 2015–16

=== Individual ===
- Persian Gulf Pro League Team of the Year: 2015–16
- Persian Gulf Pro League Most clean sheets: 2015–16
- IRFF Awards Goalkeeper of the Year: 2015–16
