= Omid Jahanbakhsh =

Iranian footballer

Personal information
- Full name: Omid Jahanbakhsh
- Date of birth: March 2, 1994 (age 32)
- Place of birth: Tehran, Iran
- Height: 1.74 m (5 ft 9 in)
- Position: Midfielder

Team information
- Current team: Saipa
- Number: 41

Youth career
- 2010–2013: Persepolis
- 2013–2015: Paykan

Senior career*
| Years | Team | Apps | (Gls) |
| 2015–2016 | Moghavemat Tehran | 0 | (0) |
| 2016–2017 | Saba Qom | 22 | (4) |
| 2017 | Sanat Naft | 5 | (0) |
| 2017–2018 | Gostaresh Foulad | 11 | (0) |
| 2019– | Saipa | 5 | (0) |
| 2020– | Gol Reyhan Alborz F.C. | 10 | (2) |
- * Club domestic league appearances and goals as of 2 February 2019

Omid Jahanbakhsh is an Iranian football midfielder who plays for Saipa in the Persian Gulf Pro League.
