= Rafael Roballo =

Brazilian footballer

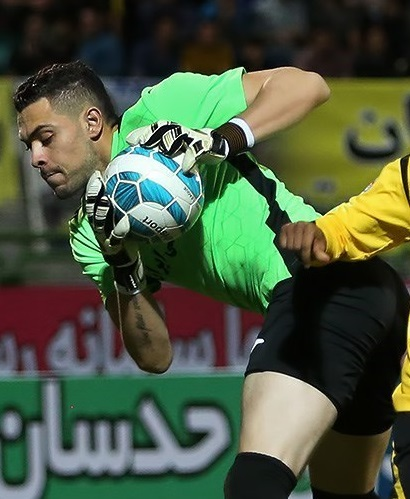

Personal information
- Full name: Rafael Roballo Maciel
- Date of birth: February 11, 1990 (age 36)
- Place of birth: Curitiba, Brazil
- Position: Goalkeeper

Team information
- Current team: Rio Claro

Youth career
- Athletico Paranaense

Senior career*
Years	Team	Apps	(Gls)
2010–2011	Rio Petro	0	(0)
2011–2012	Mirassol	0	(0)
2012	Rio Petro	0	(0)
2012–2014	ABC	5	(0)
2014	América–RN	0	(0)
2014–2015	Duque de Caxias	11	(0)
2015–2016	Atlético Goianiense	0	(0)
2016	Glória	0	(0)
2016	Novo Hamburgo	0	(0)
2016	Esteghlal Khuzestan	4	(0)
2016–2017	São Paulo	0	(0)
2017	Ypiranga	1	(0)
2018	Confiança	0	(0)
2019	Taubaté	0	(0)
2019	Luverdense	0	(0)
2020	CRAC	2	(0)
2020	Juazeirense	4	(0)
2020	São Luiz	17	(0)
2021	Hercílio Luz	7	(0)
2021–2022	Uberlândia	31	(0)
2022	Passo Fundo	3	(0)
2023	São Luiz	2	(0)
2023	Passo Fundo	15	(0)
2024–	Rio Claro	3	(0)
- * Club domestic league appearances and goals as of 20:34, 18 February 2024 (UTC)

Rafael Roballo Maciel is a Brazilian footballer who currently plays as a goalkeeper for Rio Claro.
