= Ioannis Topalidis =

Greek footballer and manager

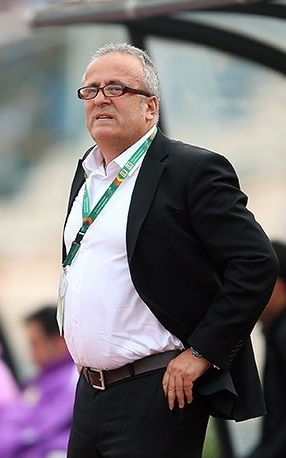
- Topalidis as Rah Ahan manager in March 2016

Personal information
- Full name: Ioannis Topalidis
- Date of birth: 24 November 1962 (age 63)
- Place of birth: Mavrodendri, Greece
- Position: Midfielder

Youth career
- 1971–1975: SpVgg Ludwigsburg

Senior career*
Years	Team	Apps	(Gls)
1975–1977	SpVgg Ludwigsburg	34	(6)
1977–1984	VfR Bürstadt	95	(22)
1984–1987	Starkenburgia Heppenheim	71	(13)
Total		200	(41)

Managerial career
- 1989–1993: Eintracht Esslingen
- 1993–1996: SC Geislingen
- 1996–1998: TSG Backnang
- 1998–2001: Hertha BSC (assistant)
- 2001–2010: Greece (assistant)
- 2012–2013: AEP Paphos
- 2013: Kavala
- 2015–2016: Rah Ahan (assistant)
- 2016: Rah Ahan
- * Club domestic league appearances and goals

Ioannis Topalidis (Greek: Ιωάννης Τοπαλίδης, born 24 November 1962) is a Greek professional football manager and former player.

== Playing career ==
Topalidis spent most of his football career in Germany where he played for clubs such as SpVgg Ludwigsburg, VfR Bürstadt and Starkenburgia Heppenheim in the German third Division.

== Managerial career ==
Topalidis began his managerial career with Eintracht Esslingen in 1989 and went on to coach SC Geislingen, TSG Backnang and was assistant coach for Hertha BSC. Topalidis became assistant manager of Greece in 2001. He was brought in by German Otto Rehhagel and won with him the UEFA Euro 2004.
