= Tractor Stadium =

Football stadium and training ground for Tractor in Tabriz, Iran

Coordinates: 38.0486°N 46.1903°E

- Tractor Stadium
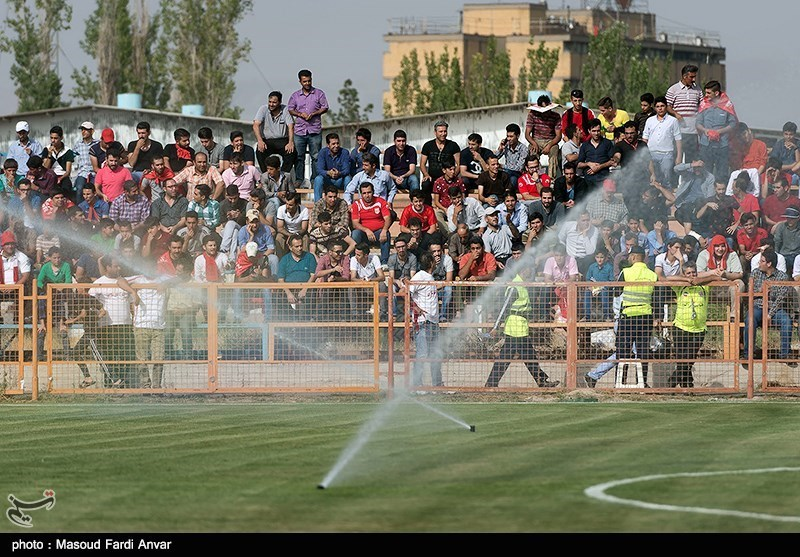
- Interactive map of Tractor Stadium
- Full name: Tractor's Shahid Bakeri Stadium
- Location: Tabriz, Iran
- Owner: Tractor Manufacturing Company
- Capacity: 7,000
- Surface: Artificial Grass

Construction
- Renovated: 2011

Tenants
- Tractor and Tractor Academy

Tractor Stadium or Tractor's Shahid Bakeri Stadium is a stadium in Tabriz, Iran. It is currently used mostly for football matches of Tractor Academy and training ground for the Tractor. The stadium holds 7,000 people and was renovated in 2011 by Iran Tractor Manufacturing Company.

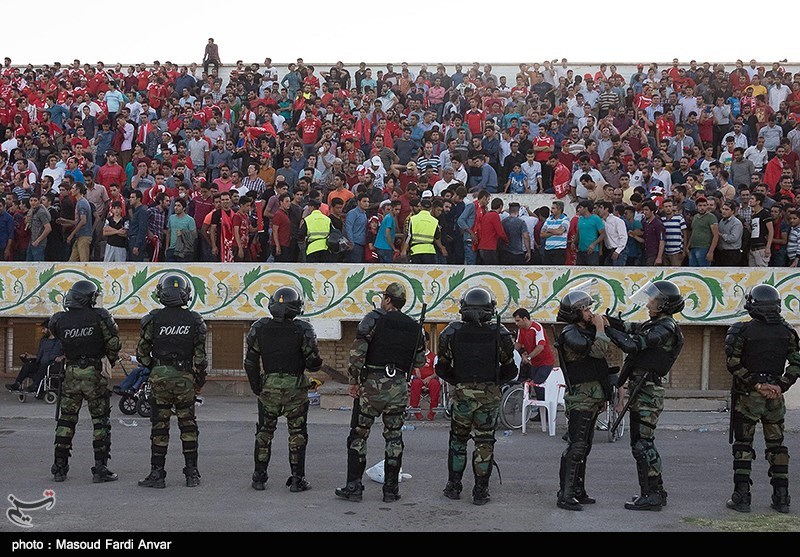
Tractor 0 - 0 Perspolis at Tractor Stadium, 10 September 2016

== See also ==
- Sahand Stadium
- Takhti Stadium (Tabriz)
- Marzdaran Stadium
