= Faraz Kamalvand =

Iranian football coach (born 1976)

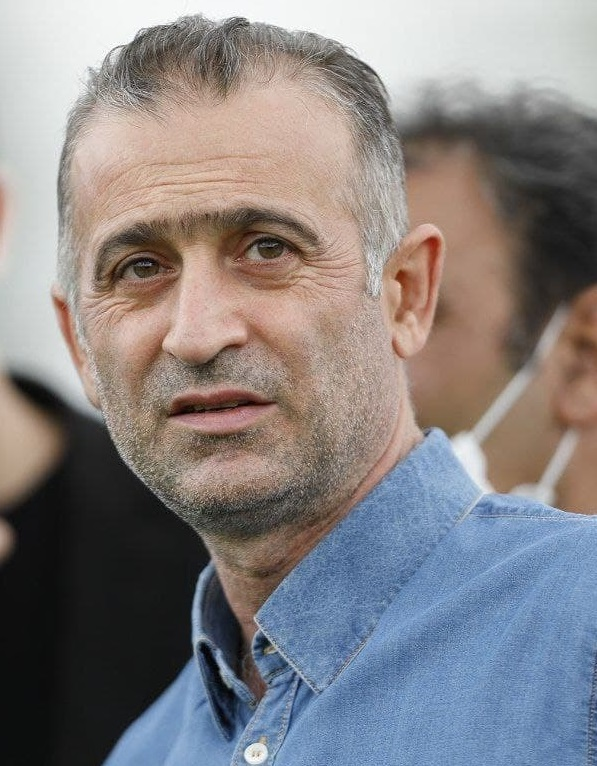
- Kamalvand in 2021

Personal information
- Date of birth: 26 December 1976 (age 49)
- Place of birth: Khorramabad, Iran

Team information
- Current team: Kheybar Khorramabad (manager)

Managerial career
- Years: Team
- 2004–2005: Bargh Tehran
- 2006–2007: Shirin Faraz
- 2007–2008: Sanaye Arak
- 2008: Delvar Afraz
- 2008–2011: Tractor
- 2011–2012: PAS Hamedan
- 2012: Steel Azin (technical director)
- 2012–2013: Shahrdari Tabriz
- 2014–2017: Gostaresh Foolad
- 2017–2018: Sanat Naft
- 2018: Oxin Alborz
- 2018–2019: Aluminium Arak
- 2019: Pars Jonoubi Jam
- 2020–2021: Shahin Bushehr
- 2021: Esteghlal (technical coach)
- 2021: Saipa
- 2021: Tractor
- 2021–2022: Naft Masjed Soleyman
- 2022–2023: Kheybar Khorramabad
- 2023–2024: Kheybar Khorramabad (president)
- 2024–2025: Sanat Naft
- 2025–2026: Nassaji Mazandaran
- 2026–: Kheybar Khorramabad

Faraz Kamalvand (Persian: فراز کمالوند, born 26 December 1976) is an Iranian football coach. He is the head coach of Nassaji Mazandaran.

== Early life ==
He was born on 27 December 1976 in Khoramabad, Iran and is from Lorestan. From 1998 to 2001, He worked for Abrarvarzeshi Newspaper and was a sport journalist. He learned coaching with Firouz Karimi. Karimi nominated him to PAS Tehran chairman, Hamid Malahi as club's Under-19 team. With PAS, he won club's first under-19 championship. He was Assistant manager of Esteghlal Ahvaz along with Karimi in 2002.

== Coaching career ==
Kamalvand is youngest head coach history of Iran Pro League He became famous after coaching Shirin Faraz and promoting to Persian Gulf Cup in 2006-07 season. He was appointed as the Tractor manager in the summer of 2008. Tractor won 2008–09 Azadegan League and promoted to Iran Pro League with Kamalvand after eight years. The best result of Tractor in the highest Iranian division under his coaching was fifth in 2010-11 Persian Gulf Cup. In June 2011, Kamalvand's contract expired and Amir Ghalenoei was appointed as Tractor's coach on 13 June 2011 He was named as PAS Hamedan F.C.'s new head coach on 18 June 2011. He resigned on 18 January 2012 after some bad results and was appointed as new head coach of Shahrdari Tabriz on 14 June 2012 and then On 4 October 2014, Kamalvand officially took over as the head coach of Gostaresh. after 3 seasons He joined at the Sanaat Naft as head coach. Kamalvand achieved the best result in the history of Gostaresh and Sanaat Naft in Persian Gulf Pro League in 2016-17 and 2017-18.

Then after a season in the Azadegan League with Gol Reyhan Alborz F.C. and Aluminium Arak, he returned to the Persian Gulf Pro League with Pars Jonoubi.

== Statistics ==
As of 10 July 2021

Team	From	To	Record							
Team	From	To	G	W	D	L	Win %	GF	GA	+/-
Shirin Faraz	July 2006	July 2007	23	12	7	4	52.17	30	13	+17
Tractor	July 2008	July 2011	94	42	32	20	44.68	128	92	+36
PAS Hamedan	July 2011	January 2012	13	5	5	3	38.46	16	14	+2
Shahrdari Tabriz	June 2012	April 2013	27	13	8	6	48.14	33	20	+13
Gostaresh	October 2014	May 2017	84	25	34	25	29.76	100	86	+14
Sanat Naft	May 2017	June 2018	34	13	19	11	38.23	43	41	+2
Gol Reyhan Alborz	July 2018	October 2018	10	4	4	2	40.00	6	4	+2
Aluminium Arak	December 2018	May 2019	15	6	7	2	40.00	11	6	+5
Pars Jonoubi Jam	June 2019	December 2019	15	1	8	6	6.66	11	17	-6
Shahin Bushehr	October 2020	March 2021	16	5	8	3	31.25	9	7	+2
Saipa	May 2021	July 2021	7	1	2	4	14.28	7	11	-4
Total			338	127	134	86	37.57	394	311	+83

== Honours ==
Shirin Faraz

- Azadegan League (1): 2006–07

Tractor

- Azadegan League (1): 2008–09
