= Iran Tractor Manufacturing Company =

Iranian tractor and heavy equipment manufacturer

- Company type: Private company
- Industry: Agricultural machinery
- Founded: Tabriz (1968; 58 years ago)
- Headquarters: Tabriz, Iran
- Area served: Worldwide
- Products: Tractors; Diesel engines
- Services: Parts, service, finance
- Number of employees: 5,000
- Website: itmco.ir

Iran Tractor Manufacturing Company (Persian: شرکت تراکتورسازی ایران) also known as ITMCO, is a manufacturer of tractors, trucks, vehicle parts and diesel engines with its main site and headquarters in Tabriz, Iran. ITMCO is listed among the 100 fortune companies of Iran. Tractor Manufacturing Company owned Tractor sport club from 1968 to 2011.

== History and development ==
Based on an agreement in 1966 between Iran and Romania to establish a tractor manufacturer in Iran, the company was created in Tabriz in 1968. The first goal was to manufacture 10,000 units tractors of 45-65 horsepower engines with single and double differential gearboxes. In 1976 Massey Ferguson started to assemble tractors in the company with an output of 13,000 units for each year; production capacity was subsequently increased to 30,000.

As of 2021, ITMC has 12 subsidiaries which contract out many tasks to 800 domestic parts manufacturers employing 200,000 people. ITMC also builds engines for various machines, including graders, compressors, water pumps, generators, forklifts, combine harvesters and road construction vehicles. ITMC makes 90% of the parts inside of Iran.

== Certifications ==
Iran Tractor Manufacturing Company has qualified for ISO 9001, and has also received awards for quality and exports.

== Export markets ==
Iran Tractor Manufacturing Company is exporting 13 different products to ten countries, including in Europe.

== See also ==
- Industry of Iran
- IDRO Group
- Privatization in Iran
- List of Iranian companies
- Agriculture in Iran
- National Enterprise Corporation
