= Shahid Qasem Soleimani Stadium (Tabriz) =

Stadium in Tabriz, Iran

Coordinates: 38°1′36″N 46°17′45″E

Shahid Qasem Soleimani
- Interactive map of Shahid Qasem Soleimani
- Full name: Shahid Qasem Soleimani Stadium
- Location: Tabriz, Iran
- Owner: Tractor S.C.
- Operator: Bonyan Diesel Co.
- Surface: Grass

Construction
- Built: 2010–2011
- Opened: 27 November 2011; 14 years ago

Tenants
- Tractor S.C. (2021-); Machine Sazi F.C. (2017-2021)

Shahid Qasem Soleimani Stadium (Persian: ورزشگاه شهید قاسم سلیمانی, Vârzeshgah-e Shihid-e Qasim Silimani) is a soccer-specific stadium that serves as the training stadium for Tractor S.C. It is located in west Tabriz, Iran.

== History ==
The building process of the stadium began on 1 June 2010.

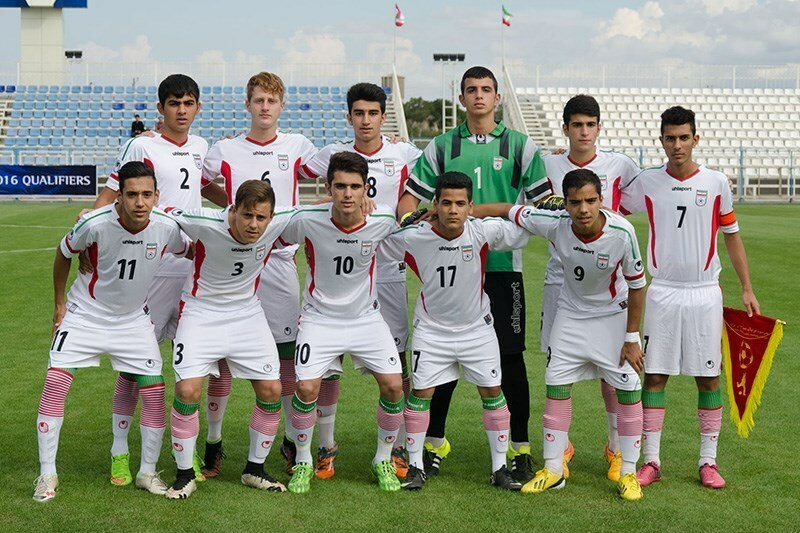
Match of under-16 between Iran & India

The second phase of standardization of stadium started on 22 July 2011. The stadium was officially opened on 27 November 2011.

== International Matches ==
Date	Team #1	Res.	Team #2	Round
18 September 2015	Iran	3-0	India	2016 AFC U-16 Championship qualification
20 September 2015	Iran	6-0	Bahrain	2016 AFC U-16 Championship qualification
