= Gostaresh Foulad F.C. =

Iranian football club

Gostaresh Foulad گسترش فولاد
- Full name: Gostaresh Foulad Tabriz Football Club
- Founded: 2008
- Dissolved: 2018
- Ground: Bonyan Diesel Stadium
- Capacity: 12,000
- League: Persian Gulf Pro League
- 2017–18: Persian Gulf Pro League, 9th
- Website: http://www.gftclub.ir/
Home colours	Away colours

Gostaresh Foulad Tabriz Football Club (Persian: باشگاه فوتبال گسترش فولاد تبریز, Bashgah-e Futbal-e Gâsteresh Fulâd Tebriz) was an Iranian football club based in Tabriz, Iran. The club was founded in 2008. They were promoted to Persian Gulf Pro League in the 2012–13 season. In 2018, the club's ownership was moved to Amir Hossein Alagheband and the club moved to Urmia.

Gostaresh Foolad also had a futsal team in the senior, under 22's, under 19's, under 17's, and under 15's levels.

== History ==
=== Establishment ===
Formed in 2008, Gostaresh took over the licence of Niroye Zamini when they ran into financial difficulties. Gostaresh had played the previous season in Iran Football's 3rd Division, placing first overall.

=== Azadegan League ===
While providing limited results in the club's inaugural season in the Azadegan League, Gostaresh found success in the Hazfi Cup.

The team reached the finals by securing a 2–0 victory over Persian Gulf Pro League side Zob Ahan The victory sealed Gostaresh a meeting with Asian powerhouse Persepolis in the Hazfi Cup final. Clearly outmatched, Gostaresh lost the home leg 1–0 from a goal by Persepolis forward Sheys Rezaei, who scored in the 12th minute. In the second leg at Azadi Stadium in Tehran, gostaresh lost 3–1 for a total aggregate loss of 4 goals to 1, giving Persepolis the Hazfi Cup.

In the 2011–2012 season Luka Bonacic took over the club's managerial role, at the end of the year Gostaresh was tied for second place and a shot at promotion, but goal difference dropped them to third, and hopes of promotion were destroyed on the final day.

The 2012–2013 season saw the introduction of Rasoul Khatibi, his tactics seemed to work and Gostaresh easily clinched automatic promotion to the Iran Pro League

=== Persian Gulf Pro League ===
Gostaresh Foolad play in the 2013–14 Iran Pro League season. They lost in the round of 16 of the Hazfi Cup to Azadegan League side Sanat Naft Abadan. In their first year in the league, Gostaresh finished 10th.

After a bad start to the 2014–15 season Mehdi Tartar was fired as head coach of the club and replaced by Faraz Kamalvand, finishing in 11th place.

Under Faraz Kamalvand Gostaresh had one of their best ever seasons in the 2015–16 season, finishing in ninth place. The club finished a best ever 8th place in the 2016–17 season. However shortly after, Faraz Kamalvand resigned and signed with Sanat Naft Abadan.

== Stadium ==
Bonyan Diesel Stadium is Gostaresh Foolad's main stadium with the capacity of 12,000. The stadium and its complex includes two grass pitches.

== Kit ==
Since the club's establishment in 2008, the teams has worn an all blue home kit with an all white away kit, corresponding with the club's logo. From 2008 to 2014, Gostaresh's kit sponsor was German company Uhlsport who also supplied the Iran national football team and a large number of other Iranian clubs. Starting in the summer of 2014, the club switched to Spanish company Kelme. After only one season with Kelme, Gostaresh once again switched sponsors and chose Iranian based company Merooj.

== Season-by-season ==
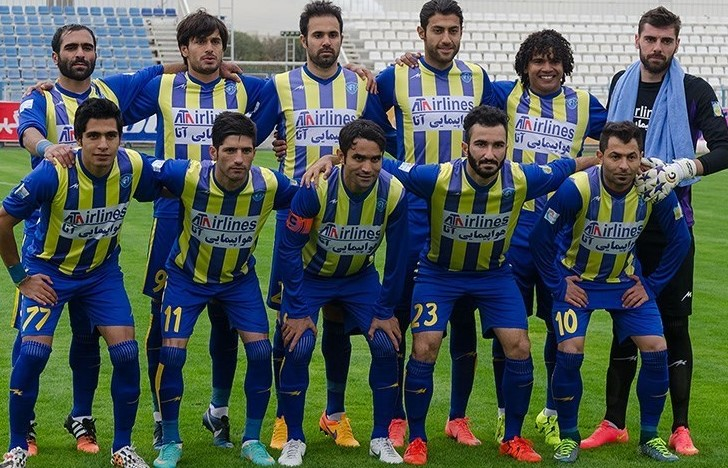
Gostaresh Foulad in 2015.

The table below chronicles the achievements of Gostaresh Foolad F.C. in various competitions since 2009.

Season	League	Position	Hazfi Cup	Notes
2008–09	3rd Division	1st	did not qualify	Promoted
2009–10	Azadegan League	8th	Final
2010–11	Azadegan League	3rd	3rd Round
2011–12	Azadegan League	9th	Round of 32
2012–13	Azadegan League	1st	did not qualify	Promoted
2013–14	Persian Gulf Pro League	10th	Round of 16
2014–15	Persian Gulf Pro League	11th	Round of 16
2015–16	Persian Gulf Pro League	9th	Round of 16
2016–17	Persian Gulf Pro League	8th	Quarterfinals
2017–18	Persian Gulf Pro League	9th	Quarterfinals

== International friendlies ==
Since its establishment Gostaresh has played a number of European friendlies. Their biggest result came on 3 July 2016 after defeating Turkish runners up Fenerbahçe.

Win Draw Loss Postponed

Date Round	Home	Score	Away	Location

8 January 2016	(Turkey) Eskişehirspor	0–2	Gostaresh Foolad	Turkey
			Ebrahimi; Ebrahimi

13 January 2016	(Germany) Hannover 96	2–0	Gostaresh Foolad	Turkey

3 July 2016	(Turkey) Fenerbahçe	0–3	Gostaresh Foolad	Turkey
			Shojaeian; Seyedi; Seyedi

7 July 2016	Gostaresh Foolad	0–0	(Romania) Voluntari	Turkey

8 July 2017	(Turkey) Beşiktaş U23	0–2	Gostaresh Foolad	Turkey

== Head coaches ==
Manager	Years
(Iran) Hossein Khatibi	Jan 2009 – Mar 2010
(Iran) Farhad Kazemi	Mar 2010 – Dec 2010
(Croatia) Luka Bonačić	Dec 15, 2010 – Jun 25, 2011
(Turkey) Engin Firat	Jul 1, 2011 – Sep 30, 2011
(Iran) Mohammad Hossein Ziaei	Oct 2011 – Feb 2012
(Iran) Hadi Bargizar	Feb 2012 – Jul 2012
(Iran) Rasoul Khatibi	Jul 1, 2012 – Jan 2, 2014
(Iran) Mehdi Tartar	Jan 2, 2014 – Oct 3, 2014
(Iran) Faraz Kamalvand	Oct 4, 2014 –May 4, 2017
(Croatia) Luka Bonačić	May 10, 2017 –Sep 29, 2017
(Iran) Firouz Karimi	Sep 29, 2017 –Jul 1, 2018

== Achievements ==
- Hazfi Cup
  - Runners-up (1): 2009–10
- Azadegan League
  - Winner (1): 2012–13
- League 3
  - Winner (1): 2008–09
- Persian Gulf Pro League

Fair play Team of the Year: 2014–15

=== Unofficial titles ===
- MDS Cup:
  - Winners (1): 2016

== Asian clubs ranking ==
As of 12 February 2017.

Current Rank	Country	Team
81	(Iran)	Gostaresh Foulad
82	(South Korea)	Gwangju FC
83	(Japan)	Vegalta Sendai
84	(Indonesia)	Persib Bandung
85	(Australia)	Adelaide United

== See also ==
- Gostaresh Foolad Tabriz FSC
