= 2018–19 Persepolis F.C. season =

Persepolis
2018–19 season
- Chairman: Hamid Reza Garshasbi (until 11 December 2018); Iraj Arab (from 11 December 2018)
- Manager: Branko Ivanković
- Stadium: Azadi Stadium
- Persian Gulf Pro League: Winners
- Hazfi Cup: Winners
- Iranian Super Cup: Winners
- 2018 AFC Champions League: Runners-up
- 2019 AFC Champions League: Group Stage
- Top goalscorer: League: Ali Alipoor (14 goals); All: Ali Alipoor (18 goals)
Home colours	Away colours

The 2018–19 season was the Persepolis's 18th season in the Pro League, and their 36th consecutive season in the top division of Iranian Football. They were competing in the Hazfi Cup, Super Cup and AFC Champions League.

== Squad ==
=== First team squad ===
No.	Name	Age	Nationality	Position (s)	Since	App	Goals	Assist	Ends	Signed from	Transfer fee	Notes
Goalkeepers
1	Alireza Beiranvand	26	(Iran)	GK	2016	115	0	1	2023	Naft Tehran	Free	
12	Abolfazl Darvishvand	21	(Iran)	GK	2016	0	0	0	2021	Rah Ahan	Free	U-23
44	Božidar Radošević	29	(Croatia)	GK	2016	15	0	0	2020	(Hungary) Debreceni	Free	
Defenders
3	Shoja' Khalilzadeh	29	(Iran)	CB / RB	2017	82	9	2	2020	Sepahan	Free	
4	Jalal Hosseini	36	(Iran)	CB / RB	2016	166	6	4	lifetime	Naft Tehran	Free	
13	Hossein Mahini	32	(Iran)	RB / LB / CB / DM	2012	157	3	6	2021	Zob Ahan	Free	
15	Mohammad Ansari	27	(Iran)	LB / CB / DM	2015	108	3	3	2021	Shahrdar Tabriz	Free	
17	Mehdi Shiri	27	(Iran)	RB / RM / RW / DM	2018	24	0	2	2020	Paykan	Free	
28	Mohammad Naderi	22	(Iran)	LB / CB	2019	13	0	0	2019	(Belgium) Kortrijk	Loan	U-23
38	Ehsan Hosseini	20	(Iran)	CB / DM	2017	3	0	0	2022	Academy	Free	U-21
69	Shayan Mosleh	25	(Iran)	LB / LM / CB	2017	58	2	1	2019	Sepidrood	Free	
Midfielders
2	Omid Alishah	26	(Iran)	LM / RM / LW / RW / SS	2013	107	15	21	2020	Rah Ahan	Free	
5	Bashar Resan	22	(Iraq)	AM / RM / LM / CM	2017	63	1	3	2021	(Iraq) Al-Quwa Al-Jawiya	Free	U-23
7	Soroush Rafiei	28	(Iran)	AM / LW / RW	2018	41	5	6	2020	(Qatar) Al-Khor	Free	
8	Ahmad Nourollahi	25	(Iran)	DM / CM / RM / LM	2014	135	5	6	2020	Foolad Yazd	Free	
9	Mehdi Torabi	24	(Iran)	RM / LM / RW / LW / AM	2018	23	2	6	2021	Saipa	Free	
11	Kamal Kamyabinia	29	(Iran)	DM / CM / RM / LM	2015	137	16	4	2021	Naft Tehran	Free	
18	Mohsen Rabiekhah	31	(Iran)	DM / CB / LB	2016	62	0	1	2020	Sanat Naft	Free	
21	Adam Hemati	23	(Iran) (Canada)	AM / RW / RM / RB	2017	12	1	0	2019	(Canada) Ryerson Rams	Free	U-25
26	Saeid Hosseinpour	20	(Iran)	AM / CM / DM	2017	8	0	0	2022	Paykan	Free	U-21
88	Siamak Nemati	24	(Iran)	RM / LM / AM / CM / SS	2017	74	9	6	2020	Paykan	Free	U-25
Forwards
10	Mehdi Sharifi	26	(Iran)	LW / RW / CF	2018	8	0	0	2021	Sepahan	Free	
19	Mario Budimir	32	(Croatia)	CF / SS	2019	17	2	2	2020	(Croatia) Dinamo Zagreb	€700,000	
23	Mohammad Amin Asadi	20	(Iran)	CF / SS	2017	9	0	0	2021	Academy	Free	U-21
70	Ali Alipour	23	(Iran)	CF / RW / LW	2015	167	55	25	2021	Rah Ahan	Free	U-25
77	Saeid Karimi	18	(Iran)	CF / SS / AM	2018	6	1	0	2022	Naft Gachsaran	Free	U-19
Players left the club during the season
27	Ehsan Alvanzadeh	24	(Iran)	LM / LW / SS	2016	17	0	0	2019	Transfer to Machine Sazi		
90	Godwin Mensha	29	(Nigeria)	CF / SS	2017	59	14	5	2019	Transfer to Esteghlal		
39	Ahmad Baharvandi	20	(Iran)	LW / RW / SS	2018	0	0	0	2019	Transfer to Aluminium Arak		
20	Shahin Abbasian	21	(Iran)	RB / CB	2017	0	0	0	2019	Released		
37	Hamidreza Taherkhani	18	(Iran)	AM / LW / RW / SS	2016	17	0	0	2021	Loan to Sepidrood		

== New Contracts ==
No	P	Name	Age	Contract length	Contract ends	Source
3	DF	Shoja' Khalilzadeh	28	2 season	2020	
37	MF	Hamidreza Taherkhani	18	3 season	2021	
70	CF	Ali Alipour	23	3 season	2021	
18	MF	Mohsen Rabiekhah	30	2 season	2020	
44	GK	Božidar Radošević	28	2 season	2020	
2	MF	Omid Alishah	26	2 season	2020	
11	MF	Kamal Kamyabinia	29	3 season	2021	
20	DF	Shahin Abbasian	20	4 season	2022	
15	DF	Mohammad Ansari	26	3 season	2021	
88	MF	Siamak Nemati	24	2 season	2020	
8	MF	Ahmad Nourollahi	25	2 season	2020	
13	DF	Hossein Mahini	31	3 season	2021	
4	DF	Jalal Hosseini	36	Lifetime		
5	MF	Bashar Resan	22	2 season	2021	

== Transfers ==
=== In ===
No	P	Name	Age	Moving from	Ends	Transfer fee	Type	Transfer window	Quota	Source
2	MF	Omid Alishah	25	Tractor Sazi	2019	—	Loan return	Summer		
5	CB	Hamed Aghaei	20	Naft Tehran	2019	—	Loan return	Summer		
17	RB	Mehdi Shiri	27	Paykan	2020	—	Transfer	Summer	PL	
10	CF	Mehdi Sharifi	25	Sepahan	2021	—	Transfer	Summer	PL	
77	CF	Saeid Karimi	18	Naft Gachsaran	2022	—	Transfer	Summer	U-21	
9	FW	Mehdi Torabi	23	Saipa	2021	—	Transfer	Summer	PL	
7	MF	Soroush Rafiei	28	(Qatar) Al-Khor	2020	—	Transfer	Summer		
17	RB	Mehdi Shiri	27	Paykan	2020	—	Loan return	Winter		
7	MF	Soroush Rafiei	28	Foolad	2020	—	Loan return	Winter		
9	FW	Mehdi Torabi	23	Saipa	2021	—	Loan return	Winter		
28	LB	Mohammad Naderi	22	(Belgium) Kortrijk	2019	—	Loan	Winter	U-23	
19	CF	(Croatia) Mario Budimir	32	(Croatia) Dinamo Zagreb	2020	€700,000	Transfer	Winter		

=== Out ===
No	P	Name	Age	Moving to	Transfer fee	Type	Transfer window	Source
2	RB	Sadegh Moharrami	22	(Croatia) Dinamo Zagreb	Free		Summer	
10	MF	Farshad Ahmadzadeh	25	(Poland) Śląsk Wrocław	Free		Summer	
77	MF	Mohsen Mosalman	27	Zob Ahan	Free		Summer	
5	CB	Hamed Aghaei	20	Oxin Alborz	Free		Summer	
19	MF	Vahid Amiri	30	(Turkey) Trabzonspor	Free		Summer	
27	MF	Ehsan Alvanzadeh	24	Machine Sazi	Free		Winter	
20	RB	Shahin Abbasian	21	Free agent	Free		Winter	
39	CF	Ahmad Baharvandi	20	Aluminium Arak	Free		Winter	
90	CF	(Nigeria) Godwin Mensha	29	Esteghlal	Free		Winter	
37	AM	Hamidreza Taherkhani	19	Sepidrood	Loan		Winter	
33	CF	Mehdi Abdi	21	Baaderan	Loan		Winter	

== Technical staff ==
Position	Staff
Head coach	(Croatia) Branko Ivanković
Assistant coach	(Croatia) Zlatko Ivanković
First-team coach	(Iran) Karim Bagheri
Goalkeeping coach	(Croatia) Igor Panadić
Physical fitness trainer	(Croatia) Marko Stilinović
Analyzer	(Iran) Farzad Habibollahi
Doctor	(Iran) Dr. Alireza Haghighat
Physiotherapist	(Iran) Meysam Alipour
Team Manager	(Iran) Mostafa Ghanbarpour
Media Officer	(Iran) Pendar Khomarlou

== Competitions ==
=== Overview ===
Competition	First match	Last match	Starting round	Final position	Record							
Competition	First match	Last match	Starting round	Final position	Pld	W	D	L	GF	GA	GD	Win %
PGPL	26 July 2018	16 May 2019	Matchday 1	Winners	30	16	13	1	36	14	+22	53.33
Hazfi Cup	18 October 2018	2 June 2019	Round of 32	Winners	5	4	1	0	5	1	+4	80.00
Super Cup	20 July 2018		Final	Winners	1	1	0	0	3	0	+3	100.00
2018 ACL	28 August 2018	10 November 2018	Quarter Finals	Runners-up	6	2	2	2	5	5	+0	33.33
2019 ACL	5 March 2019	20 May 2019	Group stage	Group stage	6	2	1	3	6	5	+1	33.33
Total					48	25	17	6	55	25	+30	52.08

Last updated: April 09, 2019
Source: Competitions

=== Persian Gulf Pro League ===
==== League table ====
Pos	Team	Pld	W	D	L	GF	GA	GD	Pts	Qualification or relegation
1	Persepolis (C)	30	16	13	1	36	14	+22	61	Qualification for 2020 AFC Champions League group stage
2	Sepahan	30	15	13	2	46	20	+26	58	Qualification for 2020 AFC Champions League group stage
3	Esteghlal	30	16	9	5	40	13	+27	57	Qualification for 2020 AFC Champions League Qualifying play-offs
4	Padideh	30	16	8	6	32	16	+16	56	Qualification for 2020 AFC Champions League Qualifying play-offs
5	Tractor Sazi	30	14	10	6	42	25	+17	52	

Source: IPL Table
Rules for classification: 1) Points; 2) Goal difference; 3) Goals scored.
(C) Champions

==== Results summary ====
Overall								Home						Away					
Pld	W	D	L	GF	GA	GD	Pts	W	D	L	GF	GA	GD	W	D	L	GF	GA	GD
30	16	13	1	36	14	+22	61	11	4	0	22	6	+16	5	9	1	14	8	+6

Last updated: April 04, 2019.
Source: Ipl Stats

==== Results by round ====
Round	1	2	3	4	5	6	7	8	9	10	11	12	13	14	15	16	17	18	19	20	21	22	23	24	25	26	27	28	29	30
Ground	A	H	A	H	A	H	H	A	H	A	H	A	H	A	H	H	A	H	A	H	A	A	H	A	H	A	H	A	H	A
Result	W	W	D	D	D	W	W	D	W	D	W	D	D	W	W	W	L	W	D	W	D	W	W	W	W	D	D	D	D	W
Position	3	1	1	3	3	2	2	3	3	3	4	4	4	3	3	1	2	2	2	1	1	1	1	1	1	1	1	1	1	1

Updated to match(es) played on April 04, 2019. Source: "iranleague". Archived from the original on 26 January 2018.
A = Away; H = Home; W = Win; D = Draw; L = Loss; P = Postponed

==== Matches ====
Win Draw Loss Postponed

Date Round	Home	Score	Away	Location

26 July 2018 1	Padideh	0 – 1	Persepolis	Mashhad
20:45 DST +04:30		Report	Alipour 8' (pen.) (yellow card) 4'; Nourollahi (yellow card) 37'; Kamyabinia (yellow card) 73'; Hosseini (yellow card) 85'	Stadium: Imam Reza Stadium; Attendance: 21,000; Referee: Payam Heydari

3 August 2018 2	Persepolis	3 – 0	Foolad	Tehran
20:45 DST +04:30	Nemati 21' 75'; Mensha 65'	Report	Moridi (yellow card) 29' (yellow-red card) 50'; Pereira (yellow card) 77'	Stadium: Azadi Stadium; Attendance: 50,000; Referee: Hossein Zargar

9 August 2018 3	Esteghlal Khuzestan	0 – 0	Persepolis	Ahvaz
20:30 DST +04:30	Hamdinejad (yellow card) 42'; Karimi (yellow card) 62'; Shahmakvandzadeh (yellow card) 90+3'	Report	Alvanzadeh (yellow card) 87'; Nemati (yellow card) 89'; Khalilzadeh (yellow card) 90+3'	Stadium: Ghadir Stadium; Attendance: 9,000; Referee: Vahid Kazemi

17 August 2018 4	Persepolis	0 – 0	Naft Masjed Soleyman	Tehran
20:30 DST +04:30	Nemati (yellow card) 27'	Report	Vakia (yellow card) 43'; Asgari (yellow card) 70'	Stadium: Azadi Stadium; Attendance: 40,000; Referee: Payam Heydari

23 August 2018 5	Sanat Naft Abadan	1 – 1	Persepolis	Abadan
20:15 DST +04:30	Jahani 23'; Barzay (yellow card) 25'; Ahmadi (yellow card) 55'; Saki (yellow card) 73'; Karrar (yellow card) 75'; Mojademi (yellow card) 89'	Report	Alipour 68'; Khalilzadeh (yellow card) 45'; Kamyabinia (yellow card) 85'	Stadium: Takhti Abadan; Attendance: 6,000; Referee: Mohammad Hosein Zahedifard

12 September 2018 6	Persepolis	2 – 1	Nassaji Mazandaran	Tehran
20:30 DST +04:30	Alipour 50'; Shiri 70' (o.g.); Kamyabinia (yellow card) 43'	Report	Gvelesiani 90+5' (pen.); Divsalar (yellow card) 23'; Abshak (yellow card) 43'; Shojaei (yellow card) 45' (yellow-red card) 63'	Stadium: Azadi Stadium; Attendance: 23,500; Referee: Reza Kermanshahi

23 September 2018 7	Persepolis	1 – 0	Sepidrood	Tehran
18:45 IRST+03:30	Hemati 90'	Report	Ebrahimi (yellow card) 27'; Bayrami (yellow card) 54'; Ghorbanzadeh (yellow card) 69'; Maleki (yellow card) 78'; Mahdavi (yellow card) 83'	Stadium: Azadi Stadium; Attendance: 15,000; Referee: Ali Safaei

27 September 2018 8	Esteghlal	0 – 0	Persepolis	Tehran
18:30 IRST+03:30	Sohrabian (yellow card) 25'; Montazeri (yellow card) 47'; Cheshmi (yellow card) 90+2'	Report	Nourollahi (yellow card) 75'; Khalilzadeh (yellow card) 90+1'	Stadium: Azadi Stadium; Attendance: 70,000; Referee: Alireza Faghani

19 November 2018 9	Persepolis	2 – 1	Paykan	Tehran
16:15 IRST+03:30	Kamyabinia 77'; Alipour 79'	Report	Saghebi 42'; Ghazi (yellow card) 84'	Stadium: Azadi Stadium; Attendance: 15,000; Referee: Mehdi Marjanzadeh

27 October 2018 10	Saipa	1 – 1	Persepolis	Tehran
16:35 IRST+03:30	Soleimani 87' (yellow card) 90+6'; Khaledi (yellow card) 43'	Report	Kamyabinia 15'; Hemati (yellow card) 37'; Mosleh (yellow card) 60'; Hosseini (yellow card) 90+4'	Stadium: Takhti Stadium; Attendance: 7,000; Referee: Mohammad Hosein Zahedifard

4 December 2018 11	Persepolis	1 – 0	Zob Ahan	Tehran
16:15 IRST+03:30	Khalilzadeh 15'; Alishah (yellow card) 44'; Alipour (yellow card) 45'; Kamyabinia (yellow card) 64'; Beiranvand (yellow card) 86'	Report	Bou Hamdan (yellow card) 37'; Mohammadi (yellow card) 55'; Fakhreddini (yellow card) 56' (yellow-red card) 87'	Stadium: Azadi Stadium; Attendance: 22,000; Referee: Mahdi Seyyed Ali

9 December 2018 12	Sepahan	1 – 1	Persepolis	Isfahan
16:10 IRST+03:30	Pourghaz 74'; Yazdani (yellow card) 37'; Kiros (yellow card) 71' (yellow-red card) 90+2'	Report	Alipour 89' (pen.); Kamyabinia (red card) 90+2'	Stadium: Naghsh-e Jahan Stadium; Attendance: 40,000; Referee: Alireza Faghani

25 November 2018 13	Persepolis	0 – 0	Tractor Sazi	Tehran
15:00 IRST+03:30	Kamyabinia (yellow card) 33'	Report	Dejagah (yellow card) 85'	Stadium: Azadi Stadium; Attendance: 45,000; Referee: Mohammadreza Akbarian

29 November 2018 14	Machine Sazi	0 – 1	Persepolis	Tabriz
15:00 IRST+03:30	Mehri (yellow card) 90+3'	Report	Khalilzadeh 90+3'; Alishah (yellow card) 86'; Nourollahi (yellow card) 90+3'; Radošević (yellow card) 90+4'	Stadium: Bonyan Diesel Stadium; Attendance: 5,000; Referee: Reza Mahdavi

14 December 2018 15	Persepolis	3 – 1	Pars Jonoubi	Tehran
16:15 IRST+03:30	Alipour 31' 50'; Alishah 56'; Taherkhani (yellow card) 52'; Nemati (yellow card) 63'	Report	Seifollahi 90+5' (pen.); Entezari (yellow card) 70'	Stadium: Azadi Stadium; Attendance: 45,000; Referee: Reza Kermanshahi

6 February 2019 16	Persepolis	2 – 0	Padideh	Tehran
17:00 IRST+03:30	Alipour 23'; Nemati 32'; Khalilzadeh (yellow card) 56'	Report	Hosseini (yellow card) 75'; Rigi (yellow card) 88'	Stadium: Azadi Stadium; Attendance: 30,000; Referee: Mahdi Seyyed Ali

10 February 2019 17	Foolad	2 – 1	Persepolis	Ahvaz
17:00 IRST+03:30	Zobeydi 25'; Pereira 45' (pen.) (yellow card) 78'; Doraghi (yellow card) 14'; Jafari (yellow card) 37'	Report	Kamyabinia 85'; Beiranvand (yellow card) 45'; Nourollahi (yellow card) 71'; Resan (yellow card) 84'	Stadium: Ghadir Stadium; Attendance: 20,000; Referee: Reza Kermanshahi

14 February 2019 18	Persepolis	2 – 0	Esteghlal Khuzestan	Tehran
16:00 IRST+03:30	Hosseini 61'; Alipour 88'; Khalilzadeh (yellow card) 52'	Report	Kiani (yellow card) 33' (yellow-red card) 35'; Namdari (yellow card) 68'	Stadium: Azadi Stadium; Attendance: 25,000; Referee: Mooud Bonyadifar

23 February 2019 19	Naft Masjed Soleyman	0 – 0	Persepolis	Masjed Soleyman
16:00 IRST+03:30	Hashemizadeh (yellow card) 48'; Nassari (yellow card) 57'	Report	Mosleh (yellow card) 21'	Stadium: Behnam Mohammadi Stadium; Attendance: 15,000; Referee: Hossein Zargar

28 February 2019 20	Persepolis	1 – 0	Sanat Naft Abadan	Tehran
18:30 IRST+03:30	Alipour 21'; Nourollahi (yellow card) 48'; Nemati (yellow card) 81'	Report	Hakhamaneshi (yellow card) 78'; Mojademi (yellow card) 85'	Stadium: Azadi Stadium; Attendance: 10,000; Referee: Reza Mahdavi

8 March 2019 21	Nassaji Mazandaran	1 – 1	Persepolis	Qaem Shahr
16:00 (DST+04:30)	Nazari 21'; Miri (yellow card) 55'	Report	Rafiei 63' (yellow card) 90+4'; Sharifi (yellow card) 66'; Kamyabinia (yellow card) 80'	Stadium: Vatani Stadium; Attendance: 12,000; Referee: Alireza Faghani

15 March 2019 22	Sepidrood	1 – 3	Persepolis	Rasht
16:30 IRST+03:30	Bayrami 67'; Gholami (yellow card) 48'; Nozhati (yellow card) 81'	Report	Alipour 11'; Nourollahi 31'; Nemati 41'; Sharifi (yellow card) 80'; Naderi (yellow card) 90'	Stadium: Sardar Jangal; Attendance: 15,000; Referee: Hossein Zargar

30 March 2019 23	Persepolis	1 – 0	Esteghlal	Tehran
16:00 (DST+04:30)	Nourollahi 21'; Khalilzadeh (yellow card) 44'; Beiranvand (yellow card) 45+2'; Torabi (yellow card) 57'; Hosseini (yellow card) 57'	Report	Zakipour (yellow card) 44'; Esmaeili (penalty missed) 45+1'; Karimi (yellow card) 59'	Stadium: Azadi Stadium; Attendance: 80,000; Referee: Ashkan Khorshidi

4 April 2019 24	Paykan	0 – 2	Persepolis	Shahr-e Qods
17:45 (DST+04:30)	Ghasemi (yellow card) 28'	Report	Nemati 45'; Alipour 89' (penalty missed) 20'	Stadium: Shahr-e Qods Stadium; Attendance: 12,600; Referee: Mahdi Seyyed Ali

13 April 2019 25	Persepolis	3 – 2	Saipa	Tehran
19:00 (DST+04:30)	Resan 32'; Alipour 49'; Torabi 62'; Naderi (yellow card) 2'		Abbasian 4'; Asadi 68'; Dashti (yellow card) 86'	Stadium: Azadi Stadium; Attendance: 47,000; Referee: Mohammadreza Akbarian

17 April 2019 26	Zob Ahan	0 – 0	Persepolis	Fooladshahr
18:00 (DST+04:30)	Bou Hamdan (yellow card) 77'		Naderi (yellow card) 40'; Khalilzadeh (yellow card) 76'; Nemati (yellow card) 78'	Stadium: Foolad Shahr Stadium; Attendance: 12,000; Referee: Ashkan Khorshidi

26 April 2019 27	Persepolis	0 – 0	Sepahan	Tehran
20:15 (DST+04:30)	Nemati (yellow card) 90+3'		Ghorbani (yellow card) 75'; Aghaei (yellow card) 90+3'	Stadium: Azadi Stadium; Attendance: 80,000; Referee: Bijan Heydari

1 May 2019 28	Tractor Sazi	1 – 1	Persepolis	Tabriz
18:00 (DST+04:30)	Esmaeilifar 79'; Imani (yellow card) 8'; Hajsafi (yellow card) 87'		Kamyabinia 11'; Beiranvand (yellow card) 44'; Torabi (yellow card) 64'; Mosleh (yellow card) 90+5'	Stadium: Yadegar-e Emam Stadium; Attendance: 60,000; Referee: Mohammad Hosein Zahedifard

11 May 2019 29	Persepolis	1 – 1	Machine Sazi	Tehran
21:30 (DST+04:30)	Alipour 81' (pen.); Torabi (yellow card) 50'		Quitongo 16'; Kanaanizadegan (yellow card) 28'	Stadium: Azadi Stadium; Attendance: 50,000; Referee: Koupal Nazemi

16 May 2019 30	Pars Jonoubi	0 – 1	Persepolis	Jam
21:30 (DST+04:30)	Pour Amini (yellow card) 69'; Ahmadi (yellow card) 70'		Budimir 41' (yellow card) 87'; Khalilzadeh (yellow card) 12'	Stadium: Takhti Stadium; Attendance: 15,000; Referee: Ashkan Khorshidi

==== Score overview ====
Win Draw Loss

Opposition	Home score	Away score	Aggregate score
Esteghlal	1–0	0–0	1–0
Esteghlal Khuzestan	2–0	0–0	2–0
Foolad	3–0	2–1	4–2
Machine Sazi	1–1	0–1	2–1
Naft Masjed Soleyman	0–0	0–0	0–0
Nassaji	2–1	1–1	3–2
Pars Jonoubi	3–1	0–1	4–1
Padideh	2–0	0–1	3–0
Paykan	2–1	0–2	4–1
Sepidrood	1–0	1–3	4–1
Saipa	3–2	1–1	4–3
Sanat Naft	1–0	1–1	2–1
Sepahan	0–0	1–1	1–1
Tractor	0–0	1–1	1–1
Zob Ahan	1–0	0–0	1–0

=== Hazfi Cup ===
==== Matches ====
Win Draw Loss Postponed

Date Round	Home	Score	Away	Location

18 October 2018 Round of 32	Persepolis	1 – 0	Navad Urmia	Tehran
18:00 IRST+03:30	M. Ansari 59' (yellow card) 55'; A. Alipour (yellow card) 74'; S. Nemati (yellow card) 88'	Report		Stadium: Azadi Stadium; Attendance: 5,000; Referee: Shahou Aslani

31 January 2019 Round of 16	Sepidrood	0 – 1	Persepolis	Rasht
15:00 IRST+03:30	A. Nourmohammadi (yellow card) 30'		S. Karimi 90+3'; S. Rafiei (yellow card) 74'; Sh. Khalilzadeh (yellow card) 85'	Stadium: Sardar Jangal Stadium; Attendance: 15,000; Referee: Payam Heydari

18 February 2019 Quarter-Final	Persepolis	1 – 1 (a.e.t.) (3 – 1 p)	Padideh	Tehran
17:15 IRST+03:30	Sh. Mosleh 20'	Report	M. Mehdikhani 12'; M. Moradmand (yellow card) 25'; Y. Shakeri (yellow card) 69'; R. Sadri (yellow card) 114'; B. Barzay (yellow card) 120'	Stadium: Azadi Stadium; Attendance: 22,000; Referee: Ashkan Khorshidi
	Penalties
	B. Resan (penalty missed); A. Nourollahi (penalty scored); M. Budimir (penalty scored); M. Shiri (penalty missed); A. Alipour (penalty scored)		B. Barzay (penalty scored); M. Rigi (penalty missed); M. Moradmand (penalty missed); A. Nemati (penalty missed)

29 May 2019 Semi Final	Sepahan	0 – 1 (a.e.t.)	Persepolis	Isfahan
21.00 DST +04:30	S. Yazdani (yellow card) 40'; M. Iranpourian (yellow card) 45' (yellow-red card) 99'; Kiros (yellow card) 103' (red card) 105'; M. Kiani (penalty missed) 114'		S. Yazdani 120+1' (o.g.); Sh. Khalilzadeh (yellow card) 40'; S. Rafiei (red card) 105'; A. Beiranvand (yellow card) 120+3'	Stadium: Naghsh-e Jahan Stadium; Attendance: 37,000; Referee: Mohammad Hosein Zahedifard

2 June 2019 Final	Damash Gilanian	0 – 1	Persepolis	Ahvaz
21.00 DST +04:30	M. Mokhtari (yellow card) 30'; M. Heydari (yellow card) 76'		A. Alipour 23'; M. Shiri (yellow card) 47'	Stadium: Foolad Arena; Attendance: 30,655; Referee: Mooud Bonyadifar

=== Super Cup ===
Win Loss

Date Round	Home	Score	Away	Location

20 July 2018 Final	Persepolis	3 – 0	Esteghlal	Tehran
DST+04:30		Report		Stadium: Azadi Stadium
Note: The match was not played, because Esteghlal refused to do it. Football Federation declared the match 3–0 in favor of Persepolis.

=== AFC Champions League ===
==== 2018 AFC Champions League ====
Win Draw Loss Postponed

Date	Home	Score	Away	Location

28 August 2018 Quarter-finals	Al-Duhail (Qatar)	1 – 0	(Iran) Persepolis	Doha
20:00 DST+04:30	A. Ali 15'; A. Madibo (yellow card) 60'; L. Mendes (yellow card) 74'	Report	S. Nemati (yellow card) 77'; M. Ansari (yellow card) 89'	Stadium: Khalifa International Stadium; Attendance: 6,650; Referee: (Iraq) Mohanad Qassim; Man of the Match: Nam Tae-hee

17 September 2018 Quarter-finals	Persepolis (Iran)	3 – 1 (3 – 2 agg.)	(Qatar) Al-Duhail	Tehran
18:30 DST+04:30	J. Hosseini 57'; S. Al-Brake 76' (o.g.); G. Mensha 78'; K. Kamyabinia (yellow card) 12'; M. Ansari (yellow card) 27'; Sh. Khalilzadeh (yellow card) 48'; A. Alipour (yellow card) 86'	Report	K. Boudiaf 33'; B. Hisham (yellow card) 86'; M. Musa (yellow card) 90+3'	Stadium: Azadi Stadium; Attendance: 71.312; Referee: (Uzbekistan) Ravshan Irmatov; Man of the Match: Jalal Hosseini

2 October 2018 Semi-finals	Al-Sadd (Qatar)	0 – 1	(Iran) Persepolis	Doha
18:45 IRST+03:30	S. Al Sheeb (yellow card) 85'	Report	A. Alipour 86' (pen.); S. Nemati (yellow card) 77'; O. Alishah (yellow card) 39'; A. Beiranvand (yellow card) 76'	Stadium: Jassim bin Hamad Stadium; Attendance: 9.087; Referee: (Sri Lanka) Hettikamkanamge Perera; Man of the Match: Hamid Ismail

23 October 2018 Semi-finals	Persepolis (Iran)	1 – 1 (2 – 1 agg.)	(Qatar) Al-Sadd	Tehran
18:30 IRST+03:30	S. Nemati 49'; K. Kamyabinia (yellow card) 73'	Report	B. Bounedjah 18'	Stadium: Azadi Stadium; Attendance: 81.350; Referee: (Uzbekistan) Valentin Kovalenko; Man of the Match: Alireza Beiranvand

3 November 2018 Final	Kashima Antlers (Japan)	2 – 0	(Iran) Persepolis	Kashima
9:30 IRST+03:30	Léo Silva 58'; Serginho 70'; H. Abe (yellow card) 11'	Stats Report	S. Nemati (yellow card) 62' (yellow-red card) 92'; Sh. Khalilzadeh (yellow card) 72'	Stadium: Kashima Soccer Stadium; Attendance: 35,022; Referee: (China) Ma Ning; Man of the Match: Léo Silva

10 November 2018 Final	Persepolis (Iran)	0 – 0 (0 – 2 agg.)	(Japan) Kashima Antlers	Tehran
18:30 IRST+03:30		Stats Report	Léo Silva (yellow card) 43'; D. Nishi (yellow card) 70'	Stadium: Azadi Stadium; Attendance: 100.000; Referee: (Oman) Ahmed Al-Kaf; Man of the Match: Godwin Mensha

==== 2019 AFC Champions League ====
===== Group stage =====
Pos	Team	Pld	W	D	L	GF	GA	GD	Pts	Qualification	SAD	AHL	PAK	PER
1	(Qatar) Al-Sadd	6	3	1	2	7	8	−1	10	Advance to knockout stage	—	2–1	2–1	1–0
2	(Saudi Arabia) Al-Ahli	6	3	0	3	7	7	0	9	Advance to knockout stage	2–0	—	2–1	2–1
3	(Uzbekistan) Pakhtakor	6	2	2	2	7	7	0	8		2–2	1–0	—	1–0
4	(Iran) Persepolis	6	2	1	3	6	5	+1	7		2–0	2–0	1–1	—

Source: AFC
Rules for classification: Group stage tiebreakers

===== Matches =====
Win Draw Loss Postponed

Date Round	Home	Score	Away	Location

5 March 2019 1	Persepolis (Iran)	1 – 1	(Uzbekistan) Pakhtakor	Tehran
18:30 (IRST+03:30)	M. Budimir 25'; M. Torabi (yellow card) 70'; J. Hosseini (yellow card) 75'	Stats Report	M. Bikmaev 5'; Kh. Alidzhanov (yellow card) 21'; F. Sayfiev (yellow card) 22'; E. Krimets (yellow card) 15'	Stadium: Azadi Stadium; Attendance: 46,350; Referee: (Jordan) Adham Makhadmeh; Man of the Match: Sardor Sabirkhodjaev

12 March 2019 2	Al-Sadd (Qatar)	1 – 0	(Iran) Persepolis	Doha
19:15 (IRST+03:30)	B. Bounedjah 90+5' (yellow card) 90+6'; A. Afif (yellow card) 90'	Stats Report	Sh. Khalilzadeh (yellow card) 31'; M. Shiri (yellow card) 61'	Stadium: Khalifa International Stadium; Attendance: 8,053; Referee: (South Korea) Kim Dong-jin; Man of the Match: Baghdad Bounedjah

9 April 2019 3	Persepolis (Iran)	2 – 0	(Saudi Arabia) Al-Ahli	Dubai
20:00 (DST+04:30)	Sh. Khalilzadeh 18'; A. Alipour 48'; B. Resan (yellow card) 60'; M. Budimir (yellow card) 76'	Stats Report	H. Abdulghani (yellow card) 76'; S. Al Mowalad (yellow card) 90+1'	Stadium: Zabeel Stadium; Attendance: 1.878; Referee: (Japan) Hiroyuki Kimura; Man of the Match: Mehdi Torabi
Note: Matches between teams from Iran and Saudi Arabia are played on neutral venues due to deterioration of Iran–Saudi Arabia relations.

22 April 2019 4	Al-Ahli (Saudi Arabia)	2 – 1	(Iran) Persepolis	Dubai
20:00 (DST+04:30)	O. Al Somah 30' (pen.) 83'; Djaniny (yellow card) 50'; A. Tarmin (yellow card) 86'	Stats Report	Sh. Khalilzadeh 90+3' (yellow card) 58'; A. Alipour (yellow card) 49'	Stadium: Al Maktoum Stadium; Attendance: 787; Referee: (China) Ma Ning; Man of the Match: Omar Al Somah
Note: Matches between teams from Iran and Saudi Arabia are played on neutral venues due to deterioration of Iran–Saudi Arabia relations.

6 May 2019 5	Pakhtakor (Uzbekistan)	1 – 0	(Iran) Persepolis	Tashkent
17:30 (DST+04:30)	I. Sergeev 86'; J. Masharipov (yellow card) 65'	Stats Report		Stadium: Pakhtakor Central Stadium; Attendance: 17,350; Referee: (Australia) Chris Beath; Man of the Match: Jaloliddin Masharipov

20 May 2019 6	Persepolis (Iran)	2 – 0	(Qatar) Al-Sadd	Tehran
19:30 (DST+04:30)	M. Torabi 17' (yellow card) 86'; A. Alipour 67'; Sh. Khalilzadeh (yellow card) 57'; A. Beiranvand (yellow card) 61'	Stats Report	P. Miguel (yellow card) 65'	Stadium: Azadi Stadium

=== Friendly Matches ===
==== Pre-season ====
Win Draw Loss

Date Round	Home	Score	Away	Location

26 June 2018	Persepolis	8 – 0	Persepolis Qaem Shahr	Tehran
17:20 (DST+04:30)	A. Alipour 2'; O. Alishah 8'; S. Nemati 20'; A. Nourollahi 39'; M.A. Asadi 73'; H. Taherkhani 77'; A. Baharvand 80'; G. Mensha 82'	Report		Stadium: Shahid Kazemi Stadium

4 July 2018	Persepolis	6 – 0	(Slovenia) NK Ljutomer	Varaždin
	B. Resan 34'; O. Alishah 37'; S. Hosseinpour 50', 56'; G. Mensha 60', 80'	Report		Stadium: Stadion Varteks

7 July 2018	Persepolis	1 – 0	(Croatia) NK Inter	Varaždin
	S. Nemati 31'	Report		Stadium: Stadion Varteks

8 July 2018	Persepolis	1 – 5	(Slovenia) NK Aluminij	Varaždin
	B. Resan 55'	Report		Stadium: Stadion Varteks

10 July 2018	Persepolis	1 – 1	(Croatia) NK Lokomotiva	Varaždin
	A. Alipour 45'	Report		Stadium: Stadion Varteks

15 July 2018	Persepolis	2 – 2	Gol Gohar Sirjan	Tehran
	A. Alipour; M.A. Asadi 64'	Report		Stadium: Shahid Kazemi Stadium

19 July 2018	Persepolis	0 – 0	Shahrdari Mahshahr	Tehran
		Report		Stadium: Shahid Kazemi Stadium; Attendance: 1000

==== During season ====
Win Draw Loss

Date Round	Home	Score	Away	Location

12 August 2018	Persepolis	3 – 2	Shahab Tehran	Tehran
17:30 (DST+04:30)	G.Mensha 14' (pen.); S.Karimi 43'; S.Nemati 86'	Report		Stadium: Shahid Kazemi Stadium

18 August 2018	Persepolis	4 – 0	Persepolis U23	Tehran
18:00 (DST+04:30)	G.Mensha; H.Taherkhani; M.Sharifi	Report		Stadium: Shahid Kazemi Stadium

13 January 2019	Persepolis	2 – 1	(Belgium) Eupen	Doha
	S. Karimi 85'; M. Asadi 90'	Report	David Pollet 67'	Stadium: Aspire Zone

18 January 2019	Persepolis	4 – 0	(Qatar) Al-Shahania	Doha
17:30	A. Alipour 45+3', 51'; S. Nemati 28'; S. Rafiei 57'	Report		Stadium: Aspire Zone

24 January 2019	Persepolis	0 – 0	Machine Sazi	Tehran
15:30		Report		Stadium: Naft Tehransar Stadium

== Statistics ==
Player left the club during the season.

=== Scorers ===
Rank	No	N	P	Name	PGPL	Hazfi Cup	2018 ACL	2019 ACL	Total
1	70	(Iran)	FW	Ali Alipour	14	1	1	2	18
2	88	(Iran)	MF	Siamak Nemati	5		1		6
3	3	(Iran)	DF	Shoja' Khalilzadeh	2			2	4
3	11	(Iran)	MF	Kamal Kamyabinia	4				4
5	90	(Nigeria)	FW	Godwin Mensha	1		1		2
5	4	(Iran)	DF	Jalal Hosseini	1		1		2
5	8	(Iran)	MF	Ahmad Nourollahi	2				2
5	19	(Croatia)	FW	Mario Budimir	1			1	2
5	9	(Iran)	FW	Mehdi Torabi	1			1	2
10	21	(Iran) (Canada)	MF	Adam Hemati	1				1
10	15	(Iran)	DF	Mohammad Ansari		1			1
10	2	(Iran)	MF	Omid Alishah	1				1
10	77	(Iran)	FW	Saeid Karimi		1			1
10	69	(Iran)	DF	Shayan Mosleh		1			1
10	7	(Iran)	MF	Soroush Rafiei	1				1
10	5	(Iraq)	MF	Bashar Resan	1				1
Own goal					1	1	1		3
Total					36	5	5	6	52
Last updated: 3 June 2019

=== Assists ===
Rank	No	N	P	Name	PGPL	Hazfi Cup	2018 ACL	2019 ACL	Total
1	2	(Iran)	MF	Omid Alishah	5			1	6
1	9	(Iran)	FW	Mehdi Torabi	4	1		1	6
3	70	(Iran)	FW	Ali Alipour	4		1		5
4	90	(Nigeria)	FW	Godwin Mensha	2		1		3
4	5	(Iraq)	MF	Bashar Resan	2			1	3
6	19	(Croatia)	FW	Mario Budimir	2				2
6	8	(Iran)	MF	Ahmad Nourollahi	1			1	2
6	11	(Iran)	MF	Kamal Kamyabinia	2				2
9	13	(Iran)	DF	Hossein Mahini	1				1
9	1	(Iran)	GK	Alireza Beiranvand			1		1
9	17	(Iran)	DF	Mehdi Shiri	1				1
9	88	(Iran)	MF	Siamak Nemati	1				1
9	7	(Iran)	MF	Soroush Rafiei				1	1
Total					25	1	3	5	34
Last updated: 3 June 2019

=== Goalkeeping ===
				PGPL			Hazfi Cup			2018 ACL			2019 ACL			Total		
Rank	No	N	Name	M	GA	CS	M	GA	CS	M	GA	CS	M	GA	CS	M	GA	CS
1	1	(Iran)	Alireza Beiranvand	24	10	16	3	1	2	6	5	2^{*}	6	5	2	**39**	**21**	**22**
2	44	(Croatia)	Božidar Radošević	6	4	2	2	0	2							**8**	**4**	**4**
3	12	(Iran)	Abolfazl Darvishvand															
Total				30	14	18	5	1	4	6	5	2	6	5	2	47	25	26
Last updated: 3 June 2019

- Most clean sheets of competition

^{*} Beiranvand kept 7 clean sheets in 2018 ACL, 5 clean sheets happened before quarterfinal in 2017–18 season.

=== Disciplinary record ===
==== Bookings & sending-off ====
				PGPL			Hazfi Cup			2018 ACL			2019 ACL			Total		
No	P	N	Name	Yellow card	Double yellow card	Red card	Yellow card	Double yellow card	Red card	Yellow card	Double yellow card	Red card	Yellow card	Double yellow card	Red card	Yellow card	Double yellow card	Red card
1	GK	(Iran)	Alireza Beiranvand	4			1			1			1			7		
2	MF	(Iran)	Omid Alishah	2						1						3		
3	DF	(Iran)	Shoja' Khalilzadeh	8			2			2			3			15		
4	DF	(Iran)	Jalal Hosseini	3									1			4		
5	MF	(Iraq)	Bashar Resan	1									1			2		
7	MF	(Iran)	Soroush Rafiei	1			1		1							2		**1**
8	MF	(Iran)	Ahmad Nourollahi	5												5		
9	FW	(Iran)	Mehdi Torabi	3									2			5		
10	FW	(Iran)	Mehdi Sharifi	2												2		
11	MF	(Iran)	Kamal Kamyabinia	6		1				2						8		**1**
15	DF	(Iran)	Mohammad Ansari				1			2						3		
17	DF	(Iran)	Mehdi Shiri	1			1						1			3		
19	FW	(Croatia)	Mario Budimir	1									1			2		
21	MF	(Iran) (Canada)	Adam Hemati	1												1		
27	MF	(Iran)	Ehsan Alvanzadeh	1												1		
28	DF	(Iran)	Mohammad Naderi	3												3		
37	MF	(Iran)	Hamidreza Taherkhani	1												1		
44	GK	(Croatia)	Božidar Radošević	1												1		
69	DF	(Iran)	Shayan Mosleh	3												3		
70	FW	(Iran)	Ali Alipour	2			1			1			1			5		
88	MF	(Iran)	Siamak Nemati	5			1			2	1					8	**1**	
Total				54		1	9		1	11	1		11			85	1	2

==== Suspensions ====
No.	Pos	Nat	Player	No. of matches served	Reason	Competition	Date served	Opponent(s)	Ref.
88	MF	(Iran)	Siamak Nemati	1	2nd yellow card in knockout stage	ACL	17 September 2018	Al-Duhail	
11	MF	(Iran)	Kamal Kamyabinia	1	2nd yellow card in knockout stage	ACL	2 October 2018	Al-Sadd	
15	DF	(Iran)	Mohammad Ansari	1	2nd yellow card in knockout stage	ACL	2 October 2018	Al-Sadd	
88	MF	(Iran)	Siamak Nemati	1	Double yellow card in a match against Kashima Antlers	ACL	10 November 2018	Kashima Antlers	
11	MF	(Iran)	Kamal Kamyabinia	1	4th yellow card	PGPL	29 November 2018	Machine Sazi	
11	MF	(Iran)	Kamal Kamyabinia	1	Straight red card in a match against Sepahan	PGPL	14 December 2018	Pars Jonoubi Jam	
3	DF	(Iran)	Shoja' Khalilzadeh	1	4th yellow card	PGPL	10 February 2019	Foolad	
8	MF	(Iran)	Ahmad Nourollahi	1	4th yellow card	PGPL	14 February 2019	Esteghlal Khuzestan	
88	MF	(Iran)	Siamak Nemati	1	4th yellow card	PGPL	8 March 2019	Nassaji Mazandaran	
3	DF	(Iran)	Shoja' Khalilzadeh	1	3rd yellow card	PGPL	26 April 2019	Sepahan	
3	DF	(Iran)	Shoja' Khalilzadeh	1	2nd yellow card	ACL	6 May 2019	Pakhtakor	
1	GK	(Iran)	Alireza Beiranvand	1	4th yellow card	PGPL	11 May 2019	Machine Sazi	
3	DF	(Iran)	Shoja' Khalilzadeh	1	2nd yellow card	Hazfi Cup	2 June 2019	Damash Gilanian	
7	MF	(Iran)	Soroush Rafiei	1	Straight red card in a match against Sepahan	Hazfi Cup	2 June 2019	Damash Gilanian	

=== Injuries During The Season ===
Players in bold are still out from their injuries.

No.	Pos	Nat	Name	Injury date	Injury area	Estimated return date	Date served	Opponent(s)	Source
18	MF	(Iran)	Mohsen Rabiekhah	12 April 2018	Anterior cruciate ligament	18 October 2018	26 July 2018	Padideh	
18	MF	(Iran)	Mohsen Rabiekhah	12 April 2018	Anterior cruciate ligament	18 October 2018	3 August 2018	Foolad	
18	MF	(Iran)	Mohsen Rabiekhah	12 April 2018	Anterior cruciate ligament	18 October 2018	9 August 2018	Esteghlal Khuzestan	
18	MF	(Iran)	Mohsen Rabiekhah	12 April 2018	Anterior cruciate ligament	18 October 2018	17 August 2018	Naft Masjed Soleyman	
18	MF	(Iran)	Mohsen Rabiekhah	12 April 2018	Anterior cruciate ligament	18 October 2018	23 August 2018	Sanat Naft Abadan	
18	MF	(Iran)	Mohsen Rabiekhah	12 April 2018	Anterior cruciate ligament	18 October 2018	28 August 2018	Al-Duhail	
18	MF	(Iran)	Mohsen Rabiekhah	12 April 2018	Anterior cruciate ligament	18 October 2018	14 September 2018	Nassaji Mazandaran	
18	MF	(Iran)	Mohsen Rabiekhah	12 April 2018	Anterior cruciate ligament	18 October 2018	17 September 2018	Al-Duhail	
18	MF	(Iran)	Mohsen Rabiekhah	12 April 2018	Anterior cruciate ligament	18 October 2018	23 September 2018	Sepidrood	
18	MF	(Iran)	Mohsen Rabiekhah	12 April 2018	Anterior cruciate ligament	18 October 2018	27 September 2018	Esteghlal	
18	MF	(Iran)	Mohsen Rabiekhah	12 April 2018	Anterior cruciate ligament	18 October 2018	2 October 2018	Al Sadd	
13	DF	(Iran)	Hossein Mahini	27 September 2018	Anterior cruciate ligament	4 April 2019	2 October 2018	Al Sadd	
13	DF	(Iran)	Hossein Mahini	27 September 2018	Anterior cruciate ligament	4 April 2019	18 October 2018	Navad Urmia	
13	DF	(Iran)	Hossein Mahini	27 September 2018	Anterior cruciate ligament	4 April 2019	23 October 2018	Al Sadd	
13	DF	(Iran)	Hossein Mahini	27 September 2018	Anterior cruciate ligament	4 April 2019	27 October 2018	Saipa	
13	DF	(Iran)	Hossein Mahini	27 September 2018	Anterior cruciate ligament	4 April 2019	3 November 2018	Kashima Antlers	
13	DF	(Iran)	Hossein Mahini	27 September 2018	Anterior cruciate ligament	4 April 2019	10 November 2018	Kashima Antlers	
13	DF	(Iran)	Hossein Mahini	27 September 2018	Anterior cruciate ligament	4 April 2019	19 November 2018	Paykan	
13	DF	(Iran)	Hossein Mahini	27 September 2018	Anterior cruciate ligament	4 April 2019	25 November 2018	Tractor Sazi	
13	DF	(Iran)	Hossein Mahini	27 September 2018	Anterior cruciate ligament	4 April 2019	29 November 2018	Machine Sazi	
13	DF	(Iran)	Hossein Mahini	27 September 2018	Anterior cruciate ligament	4 April 2019	4 December 2018	Zob Ahan	
13	DF	(Iran)	Hossein Mahini	27 September 2018	Anterior cruciate ligament	4 April 2019	9 December 2018	Sepahan	
13	DF	(Iran)	Hossein Mahini	27 September 2018	Anterior cruciate ligament	4 April 2019	14 December 2018	Pars Jonoubi Jam	
13	DF	(Iran)	Hossein Mahini	27 September 2018	Anterior cruciate ligament	4 April 2019	6 February 2019	Padideh	
13	DF	(Iran)	Hossein Mahini	27 September 2018	Anterior cruciate ligament	4 April 2019	10 February 2019	Foolad	
13	DF	(Iran)	Hossein Mahini	27 September 2018	Anterior cruciate ligament	4 April 2019	14 August 2018	Esteghlal Khuzestan	
13	DF	(Iran)	Hossein Mahini	27 September 2018	Anterior cruciate ligament	4 April 2019	18 February 2019	Padideh	
13	DF	(Iran)	Hossein Mahini	27 September 2018	Anterior cruciate ligament	4 April 2019	23 February 2019	Naft Masjed Soleyman	
13	DF	(Iran)	Hossein Mahini	27 September 2018	Anterior cruciate ligament	4 April 2019	28 February 2019	Sanat Naft Abadan	
13	DF	(Iran)	Hossein Mahini	27 September 2018	Anterior cruciate ligament	4 April 2019	5 March 2019	Pakhtakor	
13	DF	(Iran)	Hossein Mahini	27 September 2018	Anterior cruciate ligament	4 April 2019	8 March 2019	Nassaji Mazandaran	
13	DF	(Iran)	Hossein Mahini	27 September 2018	Anterior cruciate ligament	4 April 2019	12 March 2019	Al Sadd	
13	DF	(Iran)	Hossein Mahini	27 September 2018	Anterior cruciate ligament	4 April 2019	15 March 2019	Sepidrood	
13	DF	(Iran)	Hossein Mahini	27 September 2018	Anterior cruciate ligament	4 April 2019	30 March 2019	Esteghlal	
8	MF	(Iran)	Ahmad Nourollahi	25 October 2018	Quadriceps femoris muscle	3 November 2018	27 October 2018	Saipa	
2	MF	(Iran)	Omid Alishah	6 November 2018	Lateral collateral ligament of ankle joint	19 November 2018	10 November 2018	Kashima Antlers	
15	DF	(Iran)	Mohammad Ansari	10 November 2018	Anterior cruciate ligament	May 2019	19 November 2018	Paykan	
15	DF	(Iran)	Mohammad Ansari	10 November 2018	Anterior cruciate ligament	May 2019	25 November 2018	Tractor Sazi	
15	DF	(Iran)	Mohammad Ansari	10 November 2018	Anterior cruciate ligament	May 2019	29 November 2018	Machine Sazi	
15	DF	(Iran)	Mohammad Ansari	10 November 2018	Anterior cruciate ligament	May 2019	4 December 2018	Zob Ahan	
15	DF	(Iran)	Mohammad Ansari	10 November 2018	Anterior cruciate ligament	May 2019	9 December 2018	Sepahan	
15	DF	(Iran)	Mohammad Ansari	10 November 2018	Anterior cruciate ligament	May 2019	14 December 2018	Pars Jonoubi Jam	
15	DF	(Iran)	Mohammad Ansari	10 November 2018	Anterior cruciate ligament	May 2019	31 January 2019	Sepidrood	
15	DF	(Iran)	Mohammad Ansari	10 November 2018	Anterior cruciate ligament	May 2019	6 February 2019	Padideh	
15	DF	(Iran)	Mohammad Ansari	10 November 2018	Anterior cruciate ligament	May 2019	10 February 2019	Foolad	
15	DF	(Iran)	Mohammad Ansari	10 November 2018	Anterior cruciate ligament	May 2019	14 August 2018	Esteghlal Khuzestan	
15	DF	(Iran)	Mohammad Ansari	10 November 2018	Anterior cruciate ligament	May 2019	18 February 2019	Padideh	
15	DF	(Iran)	Mohammad Ansari	10 November 2018	Anterior cruciate ligament	May 2019	23 February 2019	Naft Masjed Soleyman	
15	DF	(Iran)	Mohammad Ansari	10 November 2018	Anterior cruciate ligament	May 2019	28 February 2019	Sanat Naft Abadan	
15	DF	(Iran)	Mohammad Ansari	10 November 2018	Anterior cruciate ligament	May 2019	5 March 2019	Pakhtakor	
15	DF	(Iran)	Mohammad Ansari	10 November 2018	Anterior cruciate ligament	May 2019	8 March 2019	Nassaji Mazandaran	
15	DF	(Iran)	Mohammad Ansari	10 November 2018	Anterior cruciate ligament	May 2019	12 March 2019	Al Sadd	
15	DF	(Iran)	Mohammad Ansari	10 November 2018	Anterior cruciate ligament	May 2019	15 March 2019	Sepidrood	
15	DF	(Iran)	Mohammad Ansari	10 November 2018	Anterior cruciate ligament	May 2019	30 March 2019	Esteghlal	
15	DF	(Iran)	Mohammad Ansari	10 November 2018	Anterior cruciate ligament	May 2019	4 April 2019	Paykan	
15	DF	(Iran)	Mohammad Ansari	10 November 2018	Anterior cruciate ligament	May 2019	9 April 2019	Al-Ahli	
15	DF	(Iran)	Mohammad Ansari	10 November 2018	Anterior cruciate ligament	May 2019	13 April 2019	Saipa	
15	DF	(Iran)	Mohammad Ansari	10 November 2018	Anterior cruciate ligament	May 2019	17 April 2019	Zob Ahan	
15	DF	(Iran)	Mohammad Ansari	10 November 2018	Anterior cruciate ligament	May 2019	22 April 2019	Al-Ahli	
15	DF	(Iran)	Mohammad Ansari	10 November 2018	Anterior cruciate ligament	May 2019	26 April 2019	Sepahan	
15	DF	(Iran)	Mohammad Ansari	10 November 2018	Anterior cruciate ligament	May 2019	1 May 2019	Tractor Sazi	
15	DF	(Iran)	Mohammad Ansari	10 November 2018	Anterior cruciate ligament	May 2019	6 May 2019	Pakhtakor	
69	DF	(Iran)	Shayan Mosleh	25 November 2018	Hamstring	9 December 2018	29 November 2018	Machine Sazi	
69	DF	(Iran)	Shayan Mosleh	25 November 2018	Hamstring	9 December 2018	4 December 2018	Zob Ahan	
88	MF	(Iran)	Siamak Nemati	28 November 2018	Groin	9 December 2018	29 November 2018	Machine Sazi	
88	MF	(Iran)	Siamak Nemati	28 November 2018	Groin	9 December 2018	4 December 2018	Zob Ahan	
18	MF	(Iran)	Mohsen Rabiekhah	14 January 2019	Hamstring	15 March 2019	31 January 2019	Sepidrood	
18	MF	(Iran)	Mohsen Rabiekhah	14 January 2019	Hamstring	15 March 2019	6 February 2019	Padideh	
18	MF	(Iran)	Mohsen Rabiekhah	14 January 2019	Hamstring	15 March 2019	10 February 2019	Foolad	
18	MF	(Iran)	Mohsen Rabiekhah	14 January 2019	Hamstring	15 March 2019	14 August 2018	Esteghlal Khuzestan	
18	MF	(Iran)	Mohsen Rabiekhah	14 January 2019	Hamstring	15 March 2019	18 February 2019	Padideh	
18	MF	(Iran)	Mohsen Rabiekhah	14 January 2019	Hamstring	15 March 2019	23 February 2019	Naft Masjed Soleyman	
18	MF	(Iran)	Mohsen Rabiekhah	14 January 2019	Hamstring	15 March 2019	28 February 2019	Sanat Naft Abadan	
18	MF	(Iran)	Mohsen Rabiekhah	14 January 2019	Hamstring	15 March 2019	5 March 2019	Pakhtakor	
18	MF	(Iran)	Mohsen Rabiekhah	14 January 2019	Hamstring	15 March 2019	8 March 2019	Nassaji Mazandaran	
18	MF	(Iran)	Mohsen Rabiekhah	14 January 2019	Hamstring	15 March 2019	12 March 2019	Al Sadd	
21	MF	(Iran) (Canada)	Adam Hemati	25 January 2019	Meniscus	5 March 2019	31 January 2019	Sepidrood	
21	MF	(Iran) (Canada)	Adam Hemati	25 January 2019	Meniscus	5 March 2019	6 February 2019	Padideh	
21	MF	(Iran) (Canada)	Adam Hemati	25 January 2019	Meniscus	5 March 2019	10 February 2019	Foolad	
21	MF	(Iran) (Canada)	Adam Hemati	25 January 2019	Meniscus	5 March 2019	14 August 2018	Esteghlal Khuzestan	
21	MF	(Iran) (Canada)	Adam Hemati	25 January 2019	Meniscus	5 March 2019	18 February 2019	Padideh	
21	MF	(Iran) (Canada)	Adam Hemati	25 January 2019	Meniscus	5 March 2019	23 February 2019	Naft Masjed Soleyman	
21	MF	(Iran) (Canada)	Adam Hemati	25 January 2019	Meniscus	5 March 2019	28 February 2019	Sanat Naft Abadan	
4	DF	(Iran)	Jalal Hosseini	18 February 2019	Triceps surae muscle	28 February 2019	23 February 2019	Naft Masjed Soleyman	
3	DF	(Iran)	Shoja' Khalilzadeh	22 February 2019	Quadriceps femoris muscle	28 February 2019	23 February 2019	Naft Masjed Soleyman	
69	DF	(Iran)	Shayan Mosleh	25 February 2019	Femur	4 April 2019	28 February 2019	Sanat Naft Abadan	
69	DF	(Iran)	Shayan Mosleh	25 February 2019	Femur	4 April 2019	5 March 2019	Pakhtakor	
69	DF	(Iran)	Shayan Mosleh	25 February 2019	Femur	4 April 2019	8 March 2019	Nassaji Mazandaran	
69	DF	(Iran)	Shayan Mosleh	25 February 2019	Femur	4 April 2019	12 March 2019	Al Sadd	
69	DF	(Iran)	Shayan Mosleh	25 February 2019	Femur	4 April 2019	15 March 2019	Sepidrood	
69	DF	(Iran)	Shayan Mosleh	25 February 2019	Femur	4 April 2019	30 March 2019	Esteghlal	

Notes

- ^{DM} Substituted during match.
- ^{R} Player released by The Club during his injury time.

== Club ==
=== Kit ===
Supplier: (China) Li-Ning

Home Kit	Away Kit

=== Sponsorship ===
- Main sponsor: Irancell
- Official shirt manufacturer: Li-Ning
