= Saeid Karimi =

Iranian footballer

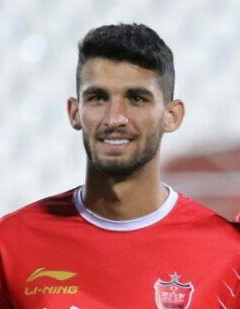

Personal information
- Date of birth: 31 January 2000 (age 26)
- Place of birth: Gachsaran, Iran
- Height: 1.87 m (6 ft 2 in)
- Positions: Striker; winger

Team information
- Current team: Fajr Sepasi
- Number: 81

Youth career
- 2014–2017: Zob Ahan
- 2017–2018: Naft Gachsaran

Senior career*
Years	Team	Apps	(Gls)
2018–2019	Persepolis	6	(1)
2019–2020	Shahin Bushehr	11	(0)
2020	Nassaji		
2020–2021	Mes Rafsanjan		
2021–2022	Havadar	0	(0)
2022–2023	Naft Gachsaran		
2023–2024	Saipa	17	(6)
2024	Malavan	0	(0)
2024–2025	Naft Gachsaran	7	(3)
2025–	Fajr Sepasi	11	(1)

International career^{‡}
2017	Iran U17	3	(2)
- * Club domestic league appearances and goals as of 6 May 2025 ‡ National team caps and goals as of 22 October 2017

Saeid Karimi (Persian: سعید کریمی; born 31 January 2000) is an Iranian football striker who plays for Fajr Sepasi in Azadegan League.

== Club career ==
=== Persepolis ===
Karimi joined Persepolis in summer 2018 with a contract until 2022. He made his professional debut for Persepolis on 1 February 2019 in 1–0 win against Sepidrood as a substitute for Siamak Nemati and scored his first goal for the club.

== Career statistics ==
As of 1 May 2019

Club	Division	Season	League		Cup		Continental		Other		Total			
Club	Division	Season	Apps	Goals	Apps	Goals	Apps	Goals	Apps	Goals	Apps	Goals		
Persepolis	Pro League	2018–19	5	0	1	1	0	0	0	0	6	1		
Shahin Bushehr	Pro League	2019–20	11	0	0	0	0	0	0	0	11	0		
Shahin Bushehr	Pro League	Career total			33	6	1	1	0	0	0	0	34	7

== Honours ==
Persepolis

- Persian Gulf Pro League (1): 2018–19
- Hazfi Cup (1) : 2018-19
- Iranian Super Cup (2): 2018, 2019

== Personal life ==
On 10 November 2025, a case was filed against Karimi's wife after a video of her surfaced at a ceremony without wearing her hijab. Karimi claims the video was made without his or his wife's consent. On 2 January 2026, Karimi publicly supported the 2025–2026 Iranian protests by sharing a poem by the 11th-century Persian poet Farrukhi Sistani, which states: "Either we hit the enemy's head with a stone, or he hangs our head on a pendulum. The story in this time of deceit is, one killed is famous, while a hundred living are disgraced."
