= Ahmad Nourollahi =

Iranian footballer

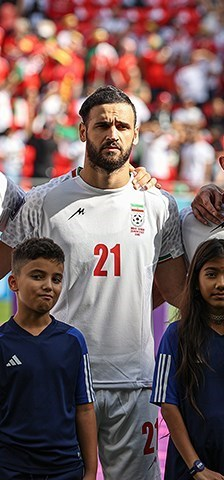

Personal information
- Full name: Ahmad Nourollahi
- Date of birth: 1 February 1993 (age 33)
- Place of birth: Azadshahr, Iran
- Height: 1.84 m (6 ft 0 in)
- Position: Midfielder

Team information
- Current team: Kalba
- Number: 10

Youth career
- 2009–2014: Foolad Yazd

Senior career*
Years	Team	Apps	(Gls)
2011–2014	Foolad Yazd	33	(4)
2014–2021	Persepolis	156	(19)
2017	→ Tractor (loan)	4	(0)
2021–2023	Shabab Al Ahli	47	(4)
2023–2025	Al Wahda	52	(12)
2025–	Kalba	32	(3)

International career^{‡}
2010–2012	Iran U17	8	(2)
2012–2014	Iran U20	6	(1)
2015–2016	Iran U23	7	(0)
2018–2025	Iran	31	(3)
- * Club domestic league appearances and goals as of 25 May 2025 ‡ National team caps and goals as of 13 October 2023

Ahmad Nourollahi (Persian: احمد نوراللهی; born 1 February 1993) is an Iranian professional footballer who plays as a Midfielder for Kalba.

== Club career ==
=== Early years ===
He was sixteen years old when he joined Foolad Yazd's Youth Academy. In 2011, he was promoted to the first team.

=== Foolad Yazd ===
After joining the first team of Foolad Yazd, Nourollahi played in the Azadegan League.

=== Persepolis ===
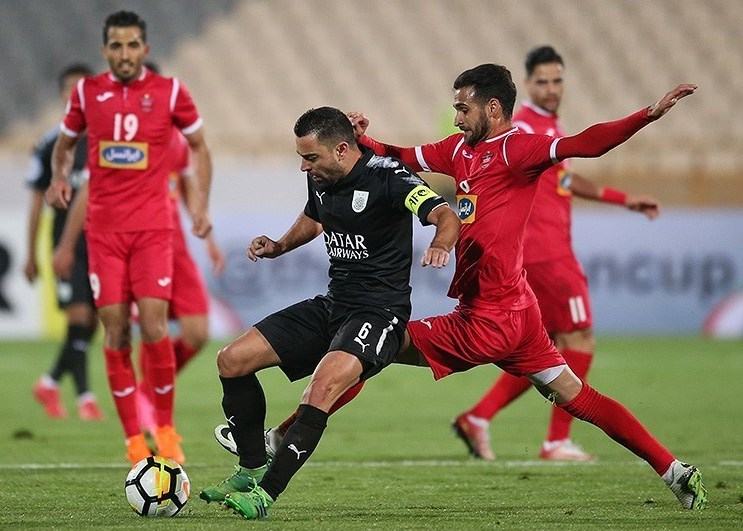
Ahmad Nourollahi and Xavi in Persepolis and Al sadd match.

After three seasons at Foolad Yazd, he joined Persepolis in the summer of 2014, signing a three-year contract on 13 June. He made his debut in the 2014–15 Iran Pro League against Foolad. In the winter of 2017, Nourollahi went on loan to Tractor until the end of the season. He returned to Persepolis before the 2018–19 Persian Gulf Pro League.

== International career ==
=== Iran under-23 ===
He was called up to the Iran under-23 team by Nelo Vingada in June 2014.

=== Senior team ===
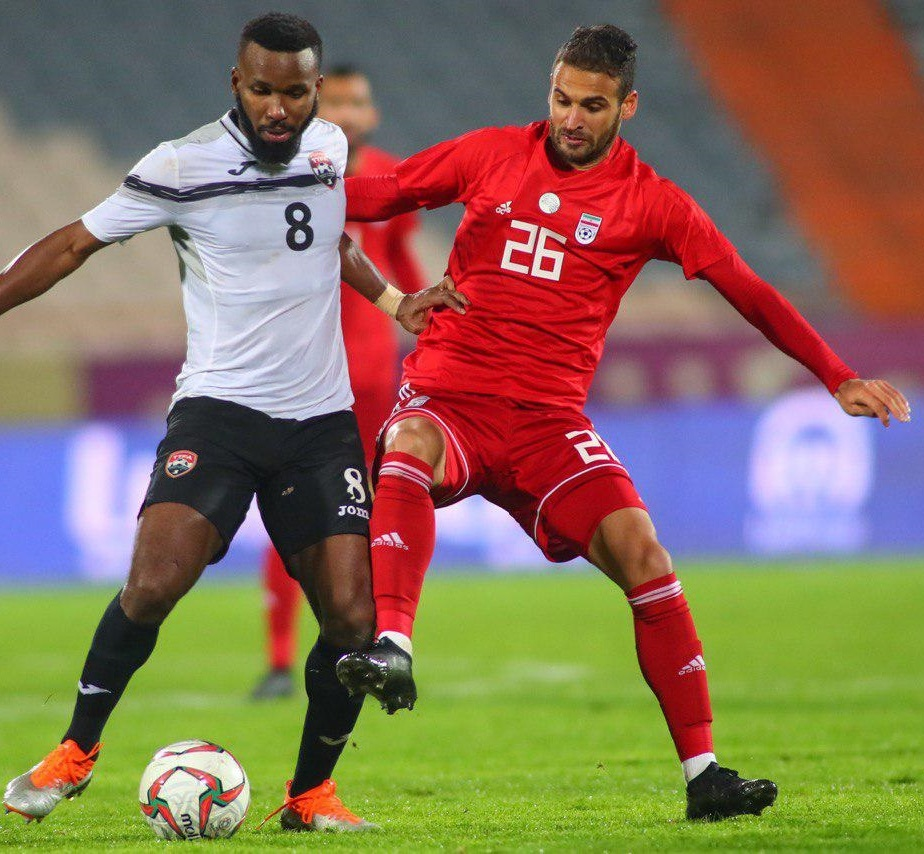
Nourollahi playing for Iran against Trinidad and Tobago

In October 2018 Nourollahi was called up to the Iran national football team training camp in Tehran by coach Carlos Queiroz. He made his debut against Trinidad and Tobago on 15 November 2018.

== Career statistics ==
=== Club ===
As of match played 25 May 2025

Club	Season	League			National cup (Note: Includes Hazfi Cup, UAE President's Cup)		Asia		Other		Total	
Club	Season	Division	Apps	Goals	Apps	Goals	Apps	Goals	Apps	Goals	Apps	Goals
Foolad Yazd	2011–12	Azadegan League	0	0	0	0	—		—		0	0
Foolad Yazd	2012–13	Azadegan League	13	1	0	0	—		—		13	1
Foolad Yazd	2013–14	Azadegan League	20	3	0	0	—		—		20	3
Foolad Yazd	Total		33	4	0	0	—		—		33	4
Persepolis	2014–15	Persian Gulf Pro League	23	1	2	0	8 (Note: Appearances in AFC Champions League)	0	—		33	1
Persepolis	2015–16	Persian Gulf Pro League	25	2	3	0	—		—		28	2
Persepolis	2016–17	Persian Gulf Pro League	14	0	1	0	2	0	—		17	0
Persepolis	2017–18	Persian Gulf Pro League	9	0	0	0	6	1	c0	0	15	1
Persepolis	2018–19	Persian Gulf Pro League	26	2	5	0	10	0	0	0	41	2
Persepolis	2019–20	Persian Gulf Pro League	29	4	4	0	4	0	0	0	37	4
Persepolis	2020–21	Persian Gulf Pro League	30	10	2	1	12	0	1 (Note: Appearance in Iranian Super Cup)	0	45	11
Persepolis	Total		156	19	17	1	43	1	1	0	217	21
Tractor (loan)	2016–17	Persian Gulf Pro League	4	0	0	0	—		—		4	0
Shabab Al Ahli	2021–22	UAE Pro League	23	3	4	0	2	0	1	0	31	3
Shabab Al Ahli	2022–23	UAE Pro League	24	1	3	1	0	0	0	0	27	2
Shabab Al Ahli	Total		47	4	8	1	2	0	1	0	58	5
Al Wahda	2023–24	UAE Pro League	26	6	1	0	–		6	4	33	10
Al Wahda	2024–25	UAE Pro League	26	6	1	0	–		2	0	29	6
Al Wahda	Total		52	12	2	0	—		8	4	62	16
Career Total			292	39	27	2	45	1	10	4	374	46

=== International ===
Scores and results list Iran's goal tally first.

No.	Date	Venue	Opponent	Score	Result	Competition
1.	10 October 2019	Azadi Stadium, Tehran, Iran	Cambodia	1–0	14–0	2022 FIFA World Cup qualification
2.	14 November 2019	Amman International Stadium, Amman, Jordan	Iraq	1–1	1–2	2022 FIFA World Cup qualification
3.	11 November 2021	Saida Municipal Stadium, Sidon, Lebanon	Lebanon	2–1	2–1	2022 FIFA World Cup qualification

== Honours ==
Persepolis

- Persian Gulf Pro League: 2017–18, 2018–19, 2019–20, 2020–21
- Hazfi Cup: 2018–19
- Iranian Super Cup: 2018, 2019, 2020
- AFC Champions League runner-up‌‌: 2018, 2020

Shabab Al Ahli

- UAE Pro League: 2022–23
