= Adam Hemati =

Canadian soccer player

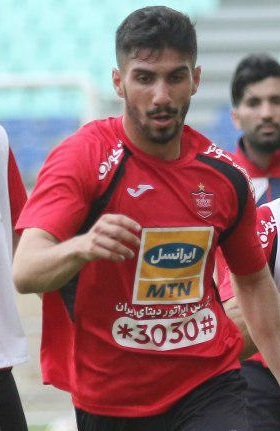
- Adam Hemati playing for Persepolis in 2018

Personal information
- Date of birth: January 22, 1995 (age 31)
- Place of birth: Scarborough, Ontario, Canada
- Height: 1.77 m (5 ft 10 in)
- Positions: Midfielder; defender

Youth career
- 2008–2012: North Toronto Nitros
- 2011–2012: Toronto FC
- 2013: Power FC Academy

College career
Years	Team	Apps	(Gls)
2013	USC Upstate Spartans	11	(0)
2014–2016	Ryerson Rams	37	(12)

Senior career*
Years	Team	Apps	(Gls)
2014	Nice II	10	(0)
2017–2020	Persepolis	12	(1)
2020	Pars Jonoubi	10	(0)
2020	Sumgayit	13	(0)
- * Club domestic league appearances and goals as of 20 November 2020

Adam Hemati (born January 22, 1995) is a Canadian-born Iranian former soccer player who is currently working at Platinum Condo Deals as a real estate agent. He signed his first professional contract with Persepolis in the Persian Gulf Pro League where they reached the Asian Champions League Final in 2018.

== Club career ==
=== Persepolis ===
In 2017, Hemati signed a professional contract with Persepolis of the Persian Gulf Pro League. He debuted for Persepolis in December 2017 in a match against Zob Ahan. He opened his scoring account in his fourth appearance for the club, scoring a goal for Persepolis in a 1–0 win over Sepidrood; this was his only goal in his career in Persepolis. He continued making appearances in games (as many key Persepolis players were injured and could not play) throughout the season, being an important player in the 2018 AFC Champions League, resulting in Persepolis becoming AFC Champions League runner-up.

=== Pars Jam ===
On 13 January 2020, Hemati signed a contract with Iranian club Pars Jonoubi Jam. He left the club on 12 August 2020

=== Sumgayit ===
Hemati joined Sumgayit FK in August 2020 and made his UEFA debut on 27 August 2020 in a UEFA Europa League qualifying match against KF Shkëndija.

== Personal life ==
Hemati is the grandson of Iranian actor Saeed Rad (1944–2024).

== Career statistics ==
As of 7 April 2019

Club	Division	Season	League		Hazfi Cup		Asia		Total	
Club	Division	Season	Apps	Goals	Apps	Goals	Apps	Goals	Apps	Goals
Persepolis	Pro League	2017–18	2	0	0	0	0	0	2	0
Persepolis	Pro League	2018–19	10	1	1	0	3	0	14	1
Career total			12	1	1	0	3	0	16	1

== Honours ==
Persepolis

- Persian Gulf Pro League: 2017–18, 2018–19
- Hazfi Cup: 2018–19
- Iranian Super Cup: 2018, 2019
- AFC Champions League runner-up: 2018
