= Kamal Kamyabinia =

Iranian footballer

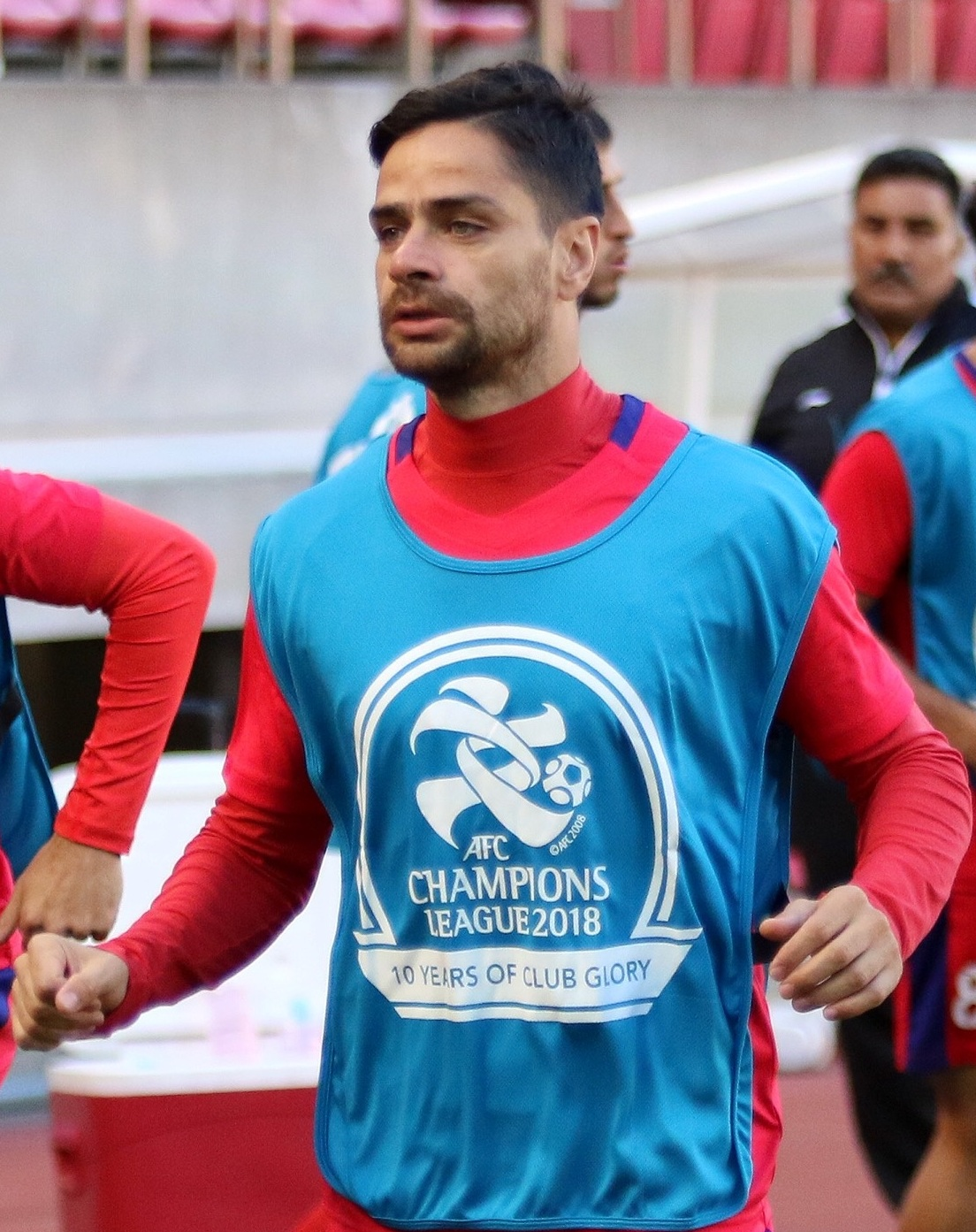
- Kamyabinia with Persepolis in 2018 AFC Champions League

Personal information
- Full name: Kamaleddin Kamyabinia
- Date of birth: 18 January 1989 (age 37)
- Place of birth: Tehran, Iran
- Height: 1.77 m (5 ft 10 in)
- Position: Defensive midfielder

Team information
- Current team: Persepolis B (assistant)

Youth career
- 1999–2004: Pas Tehran
- 2004–2007: Mes Kerman

Senior career*
Years	Team	Apps	(Gls)
2007–2009	Mes Kerman	19	(2)
2009–2011	Rah Ahan	52	(4)
2011–2013	Shahrdari Tabriz	35	(3)
2013–2015	Naft Tehran	53	(4)
2015–2023	Persepolis	178	(19)
2023–2025	Zob Ahan	30	(2)

International career
2006–2009	Iran U20	16	(3)
2009–2011	Iran U23	12	(2)
2015–2022	Iran	6	(1)

Managerial career
- 2026–: Persepolis B (assistant)
- * Club domestic league appearances and goals as of 1 December 2024

Kamaleddin Kamyabinia (Persian: کمال‌الدین کامیابی‌نیا; born 18 January 1989) is a former Iranian footballer. He played as a Defensive Midfielder in the Persian Gulf Pro League during his football career. Kamyabinia has scored 1 goal in 6 appearances for the Iran national football team.

== Club career ==
=== Mes Kerman ===
When he was playing for Mes Kerman, he was used as a striker.

=== Rah Ahan ===
Kamyabinia joined Rah Ahan in 2009 after spending the previous two seasons at Mes Kerman.

=== Shahrdari Tabriz ===
On 2 July 2011, Kamyabinia joined the Shahrdari Tabriz.

=== Naft Tehran ===
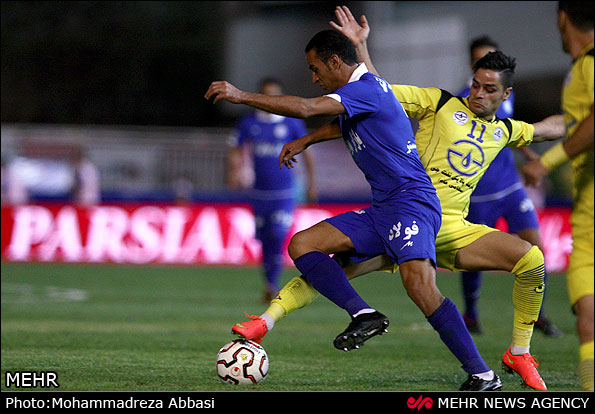
Kamyabinia playing for Naft Tehran in 2014

Kamal joined Naft Tehran in 2013. During his two years at the club he helped them to back third-place in the league which qualified them for the AFC Champions League for the first time and also finished runners-up of the 2014–15 Hazfi Cup.

=== Persepolis ===
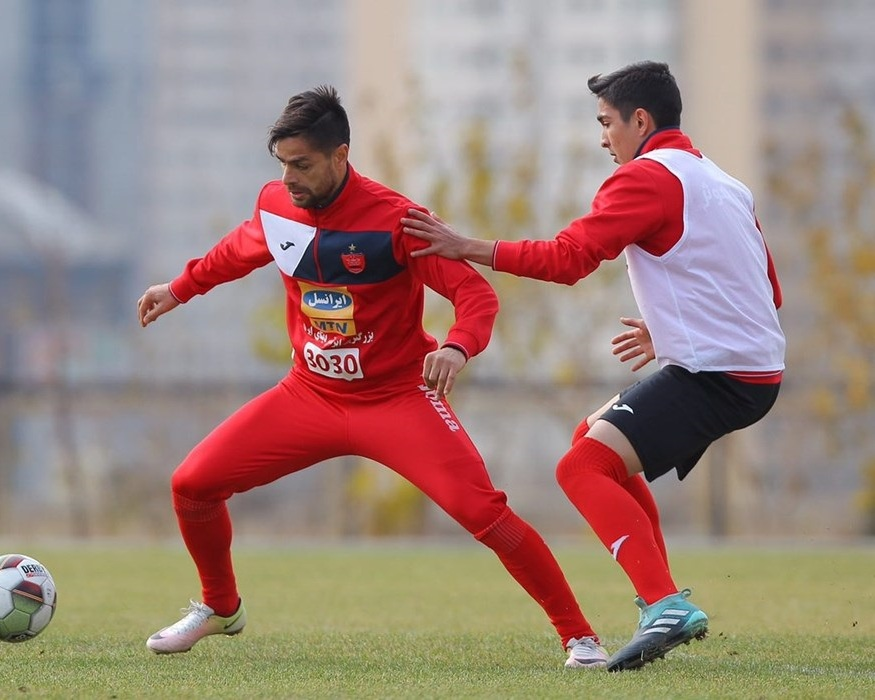
Kamyabinia in Persepolis training in January 2018

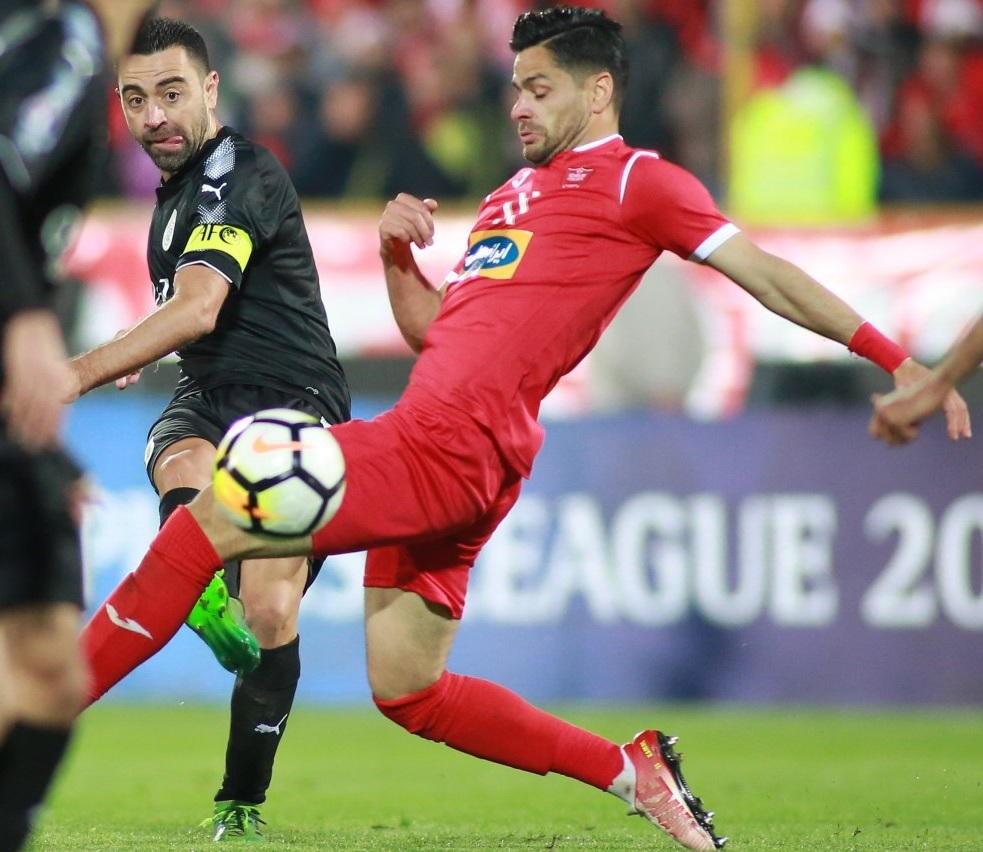
Kamyabinia (in Red) with Persepolis in ACL 2018

On 26 June 2015 Kamyabinia joined Persian Gulf Pro League club Persepolis on a two–year contract. He scored his first goal for the club on 2 February 2016 in a 2–2 draw against Sepahan. On 9 April 2016 Kamyabinia scored the winning goal in the 94th minute for Persepolis in a 2–1 victory against Malavan.

Kamyabinia scored Persepolis' first goal of the 2016–17 season on 26 July 2016 in a 1–0 win against Saipa. He has also scored important goals for Persepolis in the ACL.

Kamyabinia suffered a shoulder injury in the match against Navad Urmia in Iran's Hazfi Cup and was rushed to the hospital. He was on target for Persepolis twice in 2018–19.

On 24 August 2021, He extended his contract with Persepolis for three years. He has been one of the key players of Persepolis in these years and has played a significant role in the midfield of the team.

In 2021, Varzesh 3 wrote about his popularity among teammates. He also received the humorous nickname "Uncle" from teammates and fans.

=== Zob Ahan Esfahan ===
On 10 July 2023 Kamyabinia joined Persian Gulf Pro League club Zob Ahan on a new contract after about 8 years in Persepolis.

== Club career statistics ==
As of 3 January 2024

Season	Club	Division	League		Hazfi Cup		Asia		Other		Total	
Season	Club	Division	Apps	Goals	Apps	Goals	Apps	Goals	Apps	Goals	Apps	Goals
2007–08	Mes Kerman	Pro League	15	2	0	0	—		_		15	2
2008–09	Mes Kerman	Pro League	4	0	0	0	—		_		4	0
2009–10	Rah Ahan	Pro League	29	2	1	0	—		_		30	2
2010–11	Rah Ahan	Pro League	23	2	1	0	—		_		24	2
2011–12	Shahrdari; Tabriz	Pro League	27	2	3	0	—		_		28	2
2012–13	Shahrdari; Tabriz	Division 1	23	7	0	0	—		_		23	7
Total			121	15	5	0	—		_		124	15
2013–14	Naft Tehran	Pro League	27	1	2	0	—		_		29	1
2014–15	Naft Tehran	Pro League	26	3	5	0	8	0	_		39	3
Total			53	4	7	0	8	0	_		68	4
2015–16	Persepolis	Pro League	26	2	3	0	—		_		29	2
2016–17	Persepolis	Pro League	26	4	1	0	9	0	_		36	4
2017–18	Persepolis	Pro League	26	5	3	0	12	1	1	0	42	6
2018–19	Persepolis	Pro League	26	4	3	0	6	0	_		35	4
2019–20	Persepolis	Pro League	13	0	3	0	1	0	_		17	0
2020–21	Persepolis	Pro League	17	1	1	1	10	2	0	0	28	4
2021–22	Persepolis	Pro League	22	3	3	0	_		1	0	26	3
2022–23	Persepolis	Pro League	20	0	2	0	_		_		22	0
Total			176	19	19	1	38	3	2	0	235	23
2023–24	Zob Ahan	Pro League	21	1	2	0	_		_		23	1
Career totals			371	39	34	1	46	3	2	0	453	43

== International career ==
=== Senior team ===
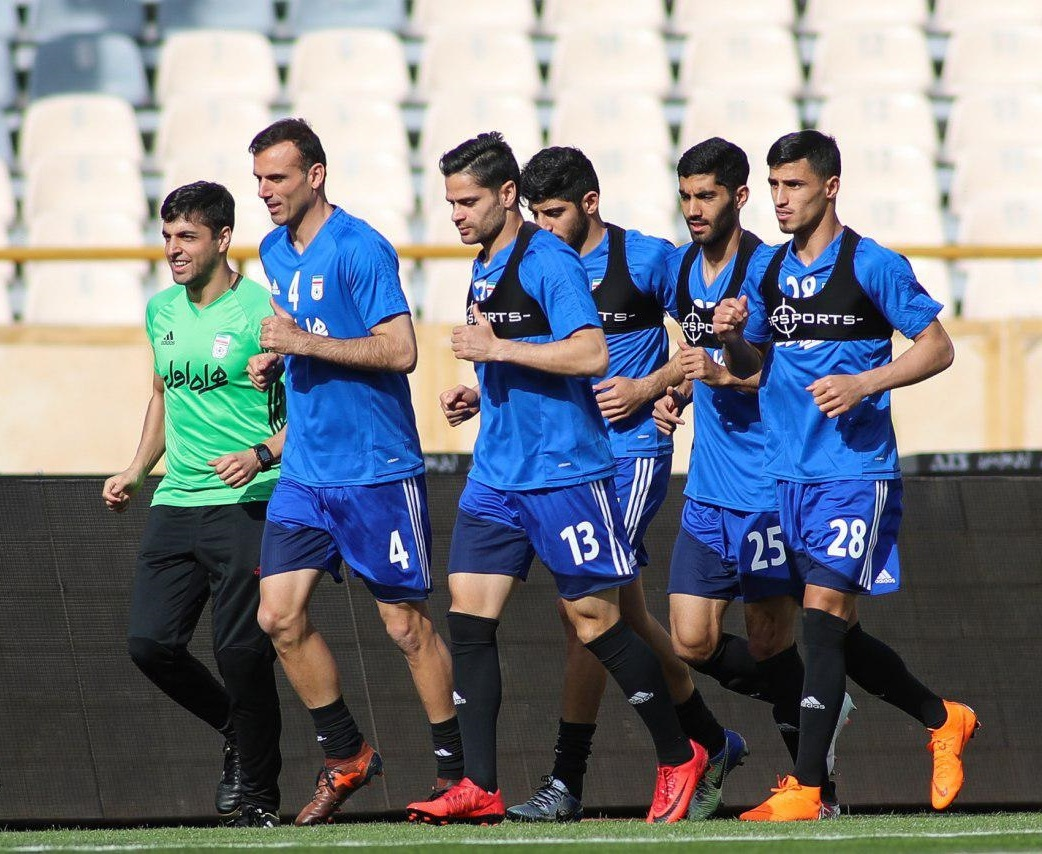
Kamyabinia in Iran training in 2018

He made his debut on 12 November 2015 against Turkmenistan in a 2018 World Cup qualifier. Kamyabinia scored his first international goal in a 6–0 victory against Guam.

=== International goals ===
Scores and results list Iran's goal tally first.

#	Date	Venue	Opponent	Score	Result	Competition
1.	17 November 2015	GFA National Training Center, Dededo, Guam	Guam	2–0	6–0	2018 FIFA World Cup qualification

== Style of play ==
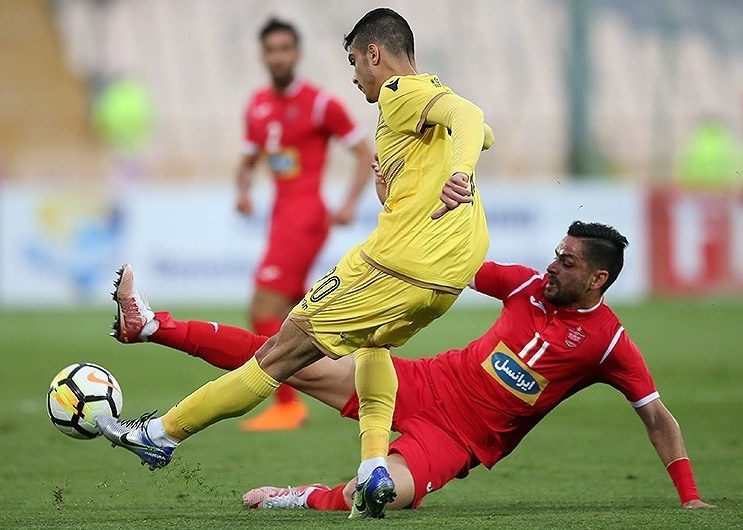
Kamyabinia (right) with Persepolis in ACL 2018

His playing style is destructive and he has a high passing ability. With his history of playing in the positions of defense and midfielder, he has been considered to have "adequate and sufficient destructive power".

== Personal life ==
He is married to Khadija Asgari, an Iranian athlete, and has a daughter named Kamand. He also sometimes took his daughter to the training of the Persepolis football team.

== Honours ==
Persepolis

- Persian Gulf Pro League (6): 2016–17, 2017–18, 2018–19, 2019–20, 2020–21, 2022–23
- Hazfi Cup (2): 2018–19, 2022–23
- Iranian Super Cup (5): 2017, 2018, 2019, 2020, 2023
- AFC Champions League Runner-up (2): 2018, 2020
