= Mohammad Amin Asadi =

Iranian Football Striker

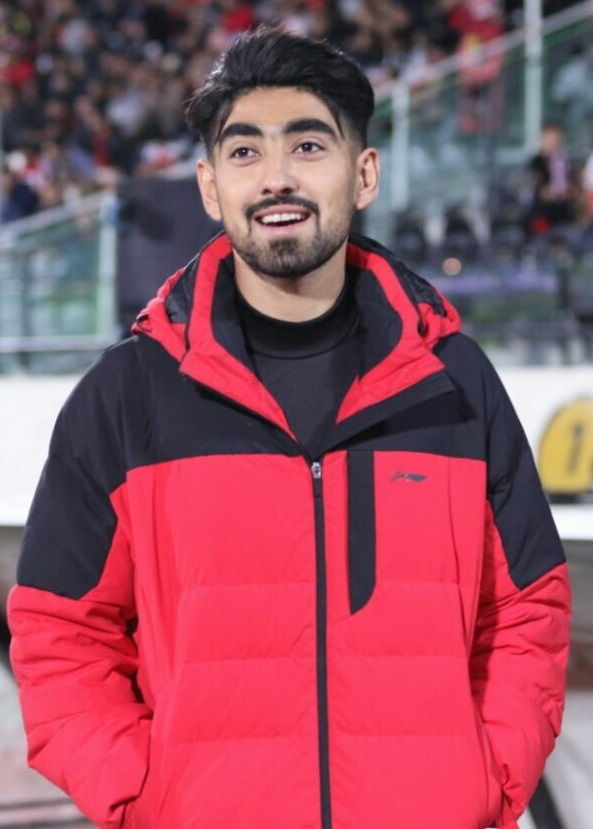

Personal information
- Date of birth: 24 December 1998 (age 27)
- Place of birth: Qom, Iran
- Height: 1.90 m (6 ft 3 in)
- Position: Forward

Team information
- Current team: Chadormalou
- Number: 9

Youth career
- –2016: Esteghlal
- 2016–2017: Ehsan Rey
- 2017: Paykan

Senior career*
Years	Team	Apps	(Gls)
2017–2020	Persepolis	9	(0)
2020	→ Naft Masjed Soleyman (loan)	5	(0)
2020–2021	Machine Sazi	16	(3)
2021–2022	Aluminium Arak	9	(1)
2022–2023	Mes Kerman	6	(0)
2023	Chadormalou	7	(3)
2023–2026	Nirooye Zamini	30	(3)
2026–	Chadormalou	4	(0)

International career
2018–2021	Iran U23	7	(3)
- * Club domestic league appearances and goals as of 29 April 2025

Mohammad Amin Asadi (Persian: محمدامین اسدی; born 24 December 1998) is an Iranian football striker who plays for Chadormalou in the Persian Gulf Pro League.

== Club career ==
=== Persepolis ===
Asadi joined Persepolis in summer 2017 with a contract until 2021.

== Career statistics ==
As of 8 August 2020

Club	Division	Season	League		Cup		Continental		Other		Total	
Club	Division	Season	Apps	Goals	Apps	Goals	Apps	Goals	Apps	Goals	Apps	Goals
Persepolis	Pro League	2017–18	0	0	0	0	0	0	0	0	0	0
Persepolis	Pro League	2018–19	9	0	1	0	1	0	0	0	11	0
Naft Masjed Soleyman (loan)	Pro League	2019–20	5	0	0	0	0	0	0	0	5	0
Career total			14	0	1	0	1	0	0	0	16	0

== Honours ==
Persepolis

- Persian Gulf Pro League (2): 2017–18, 2018–19
- Hazfi Cup (1): 2018–19
- Iranian Super Cup (2): 2018, 2019
- AFC Champions League runner-up: 2018
