= Soroush Rafiei =

Iranian footballer

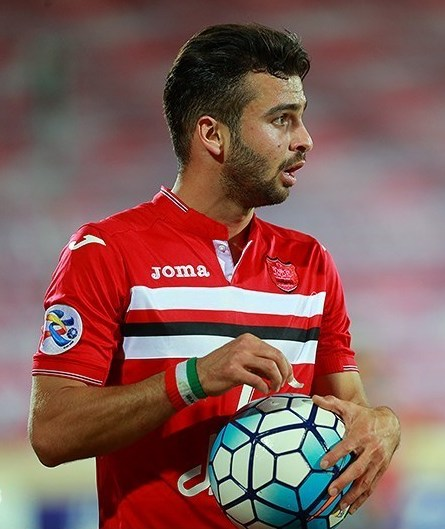
- Rafiei with Persepolis at the 2017 AFC Champions League

Personal information
- Full name: Soroush Rafiei Telgary
- Date of birth: 24 March 1990 (age 36)
- Place of birth: Tal-e Gar, Shiraz, Iran
- Height: 1.75 m (5 ft 9 in)
- Position: Attacking midfielder

Youth career
- 2005–2009: Fajr Sepasi

Senior career*
Years	Team	Apps	(Gls)
2009–2011	Fajr Sepasi	3	(2)
2011–2017	Foolad	79	(12)
2015–2017	→ Tractor (loan)	39	(5)
2017	Persepolis	14	(3)
2017–2018	Al-Khor	19	(5)
2018–2019	Persepolis	12	(1)
2018	→ Foolad (loan)	5	(0)
2019–2020	Shahr Khodro	14	(0)
2020–2022	Sepahan	61	(6)
2022–2026	Persepolis	100	(6)

International career
2014–2018	Iran	4	(0)
- * Club domestic league appearances and goals as of 20 February 2026

Soroush Rafiei (Persian: سروش رفیعی) is an Iranian professional footballer.

== Club career ==
=== Fajr Sepasi ===
He started his career with Fajr Sepasi and helped them to promote to the 2011–12 Persian Gulf Cup.

=== Foolad ===
Rafiei, 28, was a member of Foolad football team from 2011 to 2017 and helped the Ahvaz-based football team win Iran Professional League (IPL) title in 2014.

=== Tractor ===
In the summer of 2015 Rafiei signed a two–year contract with Tractor to spend his conscription period at the club. In 2016, Rafiei has been linked with a move to Greek professional football club, AEK Athens in the next transfer window. Also, Persian giants Persepolis and Esteghlal Tehran showed interest in him.

=== Persepolis ===
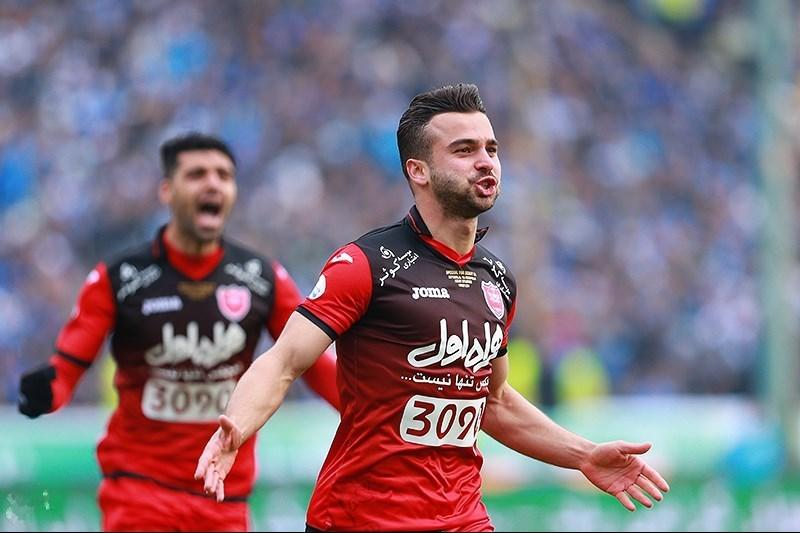
Rafiei with Persepolis in Tehran derby in 2017

On 9 January 2017, Rafiei signed a 6-month contract with Persian Gulf Pro League club Persepolis. He was given the number 7, which had previously been retired in honor of club legend Ali Parvin. He scored a goal against Esteghlal in 84th Tehran Derby. Rafiee returned to Persepolis for 2018–19 but due to fifa ban, he loaned to Foolad till winter.

=== Al-Khor ===
Before June 2017, news and rumours linked Rafiei with a move to Al Sadd. But before start of 2017–18 season, Rafiee joined the Qatari Al-Khor football team for one year, and wore number 7 in the team. At the end of the season, Al-Khor picked up an alternate player for Rafiei and did not renew his contract with the club. He considered playing in Iran's football league more difficult than playing in Qatar.

=== Return to Persepolis ===
On 8 July 2018, Rafiei joined Persepolis on a new 18-month deal.

==== Return to Foolad ====
On 24 July 2018, Rafiei joined Foolad on a new 6-month deal.

=== Shahr Khodro ===
In August 2019, Rafiei joined Shahr Khodro on a two-year deal.

=== Sepahan ===
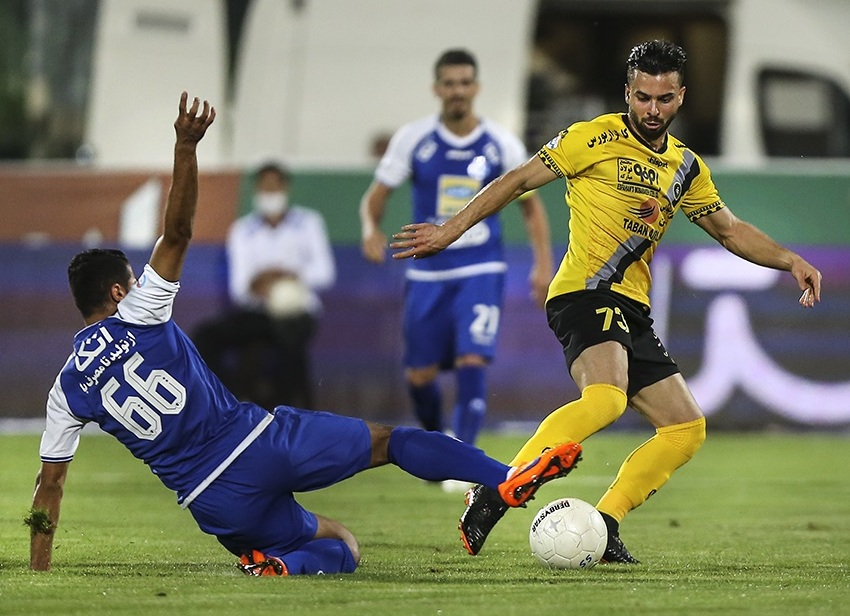
Rafiei playing for Sepahan against Esteghlal in August 2020

On 13 January 2020, Rafiei joined Sepahan S.C. on a 18-month deal. In Sepahan, he played a key role in the middle of the field. He had a high number of assists for Sepahan.

=== Return to Persepolis ===
On 15 June 2022, Rafiei joined Persian Gulf Pro League side Persepolis on a new two-year deal. This was his third contract with Persepolis.

== Career statistics ==
=== Club ===
As of 20 February 2026

Club	Division	Season	League		Hazfi Cup		Asia		Super Cup		Total	
Club	Division	Season	Apps	Goals	Apps	Goals	Apps	Goals	Apps	Goals	Apps	Goals
Fajr Sepasi	Pro League	2009–10	1	0	1	0	—		—		20	5
Fajr Sepasi	Azadegan League	2010–11	2	2	0	0	—		—		20	5
Fajr Sepasi	Total		3	2	1	0	—		—		4	2
Foolad	Pro League	2011–12	19	1	1	1	—		—		20	2
Foolad	Pro League	2012–13	16	1	0	0	—		—		16	1
Foolad	Pro League	2013–14	29	3	0	0	8	0	—		37	3
Foolad	Pro League	2014–15	15	7	1	0	1	0	—		17	7
Foolad	Pro League	2018–19	5	0	0	0	—		—		5	0
Foolad	Total		84	12	2	0	9	0	—		95	12
Tractor (loan)	Pro League	2015–16	25	4	2	0	7	0	—		34	4
Tractor (loan)	Pro League	2016–17	14	1	3	0	–		—		17	1
Tractor (loan)	Total		39	5	5	0	7	0	—		51	5
Persepolis	Pro League	2016–17	14	3	0	0	7	1	—		21	4
Persepolis	Pro League	2018–19	12	1	3	0	5	0	—		20	1
Persepolis	Pro League	2022–23	25	1	5	0	—		—		30	1
Persepolis	Pro League	2023–24	27	0	1	0	6	0	—		34	0
Persepolis	Pro League	2024–25	27	2	1	0	7	0	1	0	35	2
Persepolis	Pro League	2025–26	21	3	1	0	—		—		22	3
Persepolis	Total		126	10	11	0	25	1	1	0	163	11
Al-Khor	QSL	2017–18	19	5	0	0	—		—		19	5
Al-Khor	Total		19	5	0	0	—		—		19	5
Shahr Khodro	Pro League	2019	14	0	2	0	0	0	—		16	0
Shahr Khodro	Total		14	0	2	0	0	0	—		16	0
Sepahan	Pro League	2020	11	2	1	0	6	1	—		18	3
Sepahan	Pro League	2020–21	27	2	3	0	—		—		30	2
Sepahan	Pro League	2021–22	23	2	2	0	6	1	—		31	3
Sepahan	Total		61	6	6	0	12	2	—		79	8
Career total			346	40	27	0	53	3	1	0	427	43

== International career ==
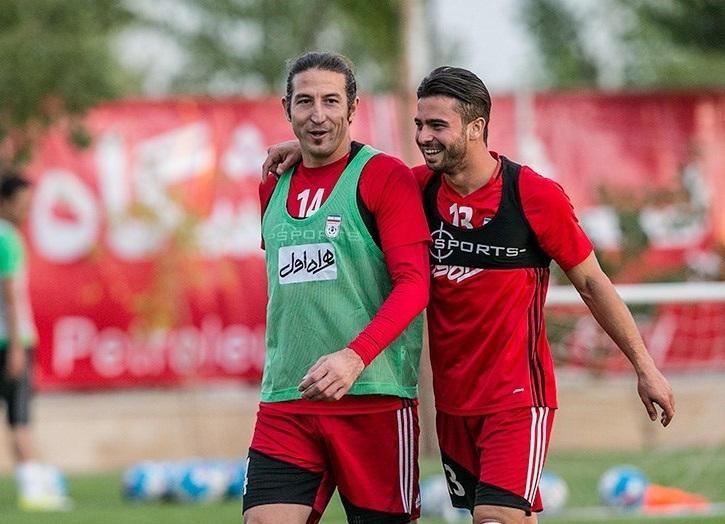
Rafiei and Andranik Teymourian in Iran national football team training

He was called up to the Iran national football team in October 2014 by Carlos Queiroz. He made his debut in a match against South Korea on 18 November 2014. He was called into Iran's 2015 AFC Asian Cup squad on 30 December 2014 by Carlos Queiroz. In May 2018 he was named in Iran's preliminary squad for the 2018 World Cup in Russia but did not make the final 23.

=== International ===
As of match played 19 January 2015

Appearances and goals by national team and year
National team	Year	Apps	Goals
Iran
Iran	2014	1	0
Iran	2015	3	0
Total		4	0

== Style of play ==
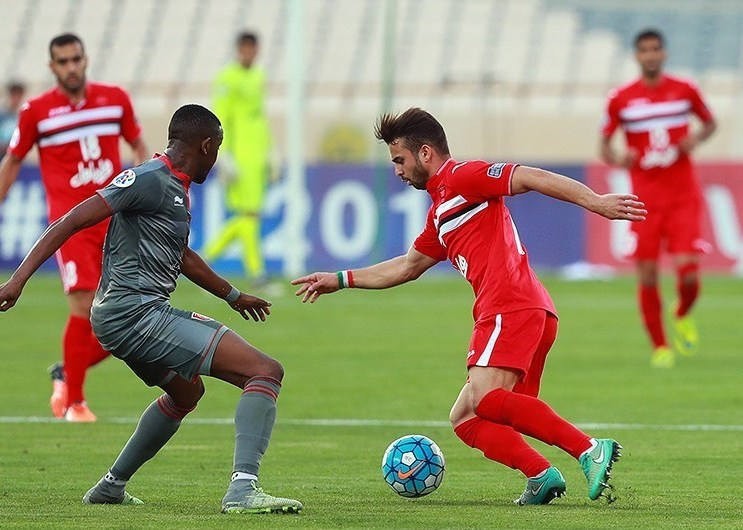
Rafiei playing for Persepolis in the ACL 2017

Rafiei is a technical playmaker. In Iranian sports media, he has been mentioned as "a midfielder who dribbles as cool as ever and his playing is just enough".

Argentinian manager and former player, Gabriel Calderón criticized his style of play due to "lack of speed" in his game plan.

== Personal life ==
Rafiei was born in Shiraz, Iran and started playing football in his hometown. He has announced that he has been a fan of Persepolis since he was a child.

On 3 February 2026, Rafiei responded to a comedic sketch on IRIB Ofogh mocking dead demonstrators of the 2025–2026 Iranian protests, saying: "I wish some IRIB presenters would become mute and not rub salt in people's wounds in this situation." On 9 February he publicly objected to being included on a list of supporters of the 1979 Islamic Revolution by the Ministry of Sport and Youth, ahead of the Revolution's anniversary.

== Honours ==
Foolad

- Persian Gulf Pro League (1): 2013–14

Persepolis

- Persian Gulf Pro League (4): 2016–17, 2018–19, 2022–23, 2023–24
- Hazfi Cup (2): 2018–19, 2022–23
- Iranian Super Cup (2): 2019, 2023

=== Individual ===
- Persian Gulf Pro League Team of the Year (3) : 2013–14, 2015–16, 2016-17
