= Shayan Mosleh =

Iranian footballer

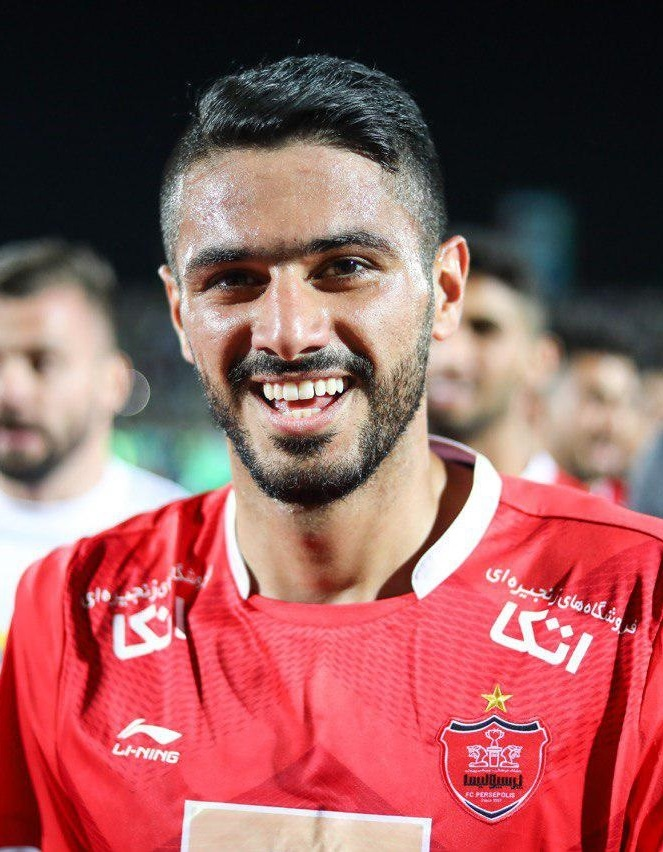

Personal information
- Full name: Ali Mosleh Taklimi
- Date of birth: 25 June 1993 (age 33)
- Place of birth: Rudbar, Iran
- Height: 1.88 m (6 ft 2 in)
- Positions: Left back; centre back

Team information
- Current team: Zob Ahan
- Number: 69

Youth career
- 2009–2010: Pegah Gilan
- 2010–2012: Esteghlal
- 2012–2013: Damash Guilan

Senior career*
Years	Team	Apps	(Gls)
2014–2015	Damash Gilan	7	(0)
2015–2017	Sepidrood	48	(1)
2017–2019	Persepolis	38	(1)
2019–2021	Sepahan	25	(2)
2021–2023	Gol Gohar	50	(4)
2023–2026	Zob Ahan	50	(0)
- * Club domestic league appearances and goals as of 17 April 2025

Shayan Mosleh Takimi (Persian: علی مصلح تکلیمی; born 25 June 1993) is an Iranian professional football player who plays for Zob Ahan in the Persian Gulf Pro League.

== Career ==
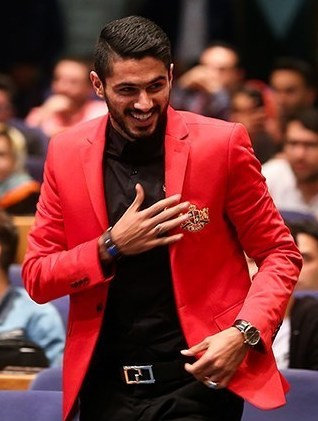
Shayan Mohleh in 2018

=== Sepidrood Rasht ===
Mosleh played for Damash Gilan before moving to Sepidrood in summer of 2015.

=== Persepolis ===
On 12 June 2017 Mosleh joined Persian Gulf Pro League club Persepolis on a two-year contract.

== Career statistics ==
=== Club ===
As of 12 May 2023

Club	Season	League			Hazfi Cup		Asia		Other		Total	
Club	Season	Division	Apps	Goals	Apps	Goals	Apps	Goals	Apps	Goals	Apps	Goals
Sepidrood	2016-17	Azadegan League	28	0	0	0	0	0	0	0	28	0
Persepolis	2017–18	Pro League	20	1	1	0	7	0	1	0	29	1
Persepolis	2018–19	Pro League	18	0	3	1	8	0	0	0	29	1
Persepolis	Total		38	1	4	1	15	0	1	0	58	2
Sepahan	2019–20	Pro League	17	1	2	0	2	0	—		21	1
Sepahan	2020–21	Pro League	8	0	0	0	—		—		8	0
Sepahan	Total		25	1	2	0	2	0	0	0	29	1
Gol Gohar	2021–22	Pro League	25	3	0	0	—		—		25	3
Gol Gohar	2022–23	Pro League	25	1	1	0	—		—		26	1
Gol Gohar	Total		50	4	1	0	0	0	0	0	51	4
Zob Ahan	2023-24	Persian Gulf Pro League	20	0	1	0	0	0	0	0	21	0
Career Totals			161	6	8	1	17	0	1	0	185	7

== Honours ==
=== Club ===
Persepolis

- Persian Gulf Pro League: 2017–18, 2018–19
- Iranian Super Cup: 2017, 2018, 2019
- Hazfi Cup: 2018–19
- AFC Champions League runner-up: 2018
