= Mehdi Shiri (footballer, born 1991) =

Iranian footballer (born 1991)

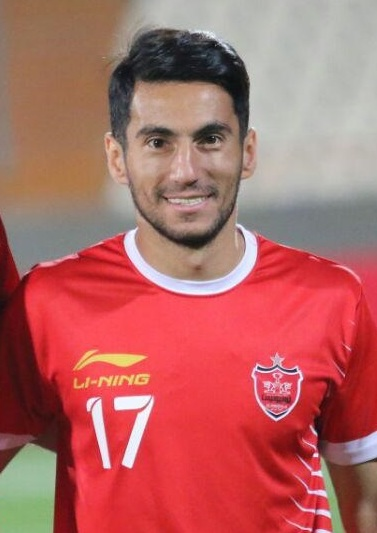

Personal information
- Full name: Mehdi Shiri
- Date of birth: 31 January 1991 (age 35)
- Place of birth: Tehran, Iran
- Height: 1.71 m (5 ft 7 1/2 in)
- Position: Right back

Team information
- Current team: Tractor
- Number: 2

Youth career
- 2003–2005: Homa
- 2005–2010: Saipa
- 2010–2012: Damash Tehran

Senior career*
Years	Team	Apps	(Gls)
2012–2013	Niroye Zamini	1	(0)
2013–2014	Malavan	21	(0)
2014–2016	Naft Tehran	54	(0)
2016–2019	Paykan	69	(8)
2019–2022	Persepolis	81	(1)
2022–2023	Foolad	39	(1)
2023–	Tractor	49	(1)

International career
2013	Iran U23	3	(1)
- * Club domestic league appearances and goals as of 1 August 2025

Mehdi Shiri (Persian: مهدی شیری, born 31 January 1991) is an Iranian professional football player who plays for Tractor in the Persian Gulf Pro League. After playing for Peykan in first half of 2018–19, he joined Persepolis as a right back.

== Career statistics ==
As of 7 February 2022

Appearances and goals by club, season and competition
Club	Season	League			Hazfi Cup		Asia		Other		Total	
Club	Season	Division	Apps	Goals	Apps	Goals	Apps	Goals	Apps	Goals	Apps	Goals
Malavan	2013–14	Iran Pro League	21	0	1	0	—		_		22	0
Naft Tehran	2014–15	Iran Pro League	25	0	3	0	9	0	_		37	0
Naft Tehran	2015-16	Iran Pro League	29	0	3	0	1	0	_		33	0
Naft Tehran	Total		54	0	6	0	10	0	_		70	0
Peykan	2016-17	Iran Pro League	27	2	0	0	—		_		27	2
Peykan	2017-18	Iran Pro League	29	5	1	0	—		_		30	5
Peykan	2018	Iran Pro League	11	1	1	0	—		_		12	1
Peykan	Total		69	8	1	0	–	–	_		70	8
Persepolis	2019	Iran Pro League	14	0	4	0	6	0	_		24	0
Persepolis	2019–20	Iran Pro League	28	0	4	0	2	0	_		33	0
Persepolis	2020–21	Iran Pro League	23	1	3	0	7	0	1	0	34	1
Persepolis	2021–22	Iran Pro League	16	0	1	0	1	0	1	0	19	0
Persepolis	Total		81	1	12	0	16	0	2	0	111	1
Foolad	2021-22	Persian Gulf Pro League	12	1	0	0	8	0	0	0	20	0
Foolad	2022-23	Persian Gulf Pro League	27	0	2	0	0	0	0	0	29	0
Foolad	Total		39	1	2	0	8	0	0	0	49	1
Tractor	2023-24	Persian Gulf Pro League	24	0	3	0	1	0	0	0	28	0
Tractor	2024-25	Persian Gulf Pro League	25	1	0	0	7	0	0	0	32	1
Tractor	Total		49	1	3	0	8	0	0	0	58	1
Career total			313	11	26	0	42	0	2	0	383	11

== Honours ==
=== Club ===
Persepolis

- Persian Gulf Pro League (3): 2018–19, 2019–20, 2020–21
- Hazfi Cup (1): 2018–19
- Iranian Super Cup (2): 2019, 2020

Tractor

- Persian Gulf Pro League: 2024–25
- Iranian Super Cup: 2025
