= Siamak Nemati =

Iranian footballer

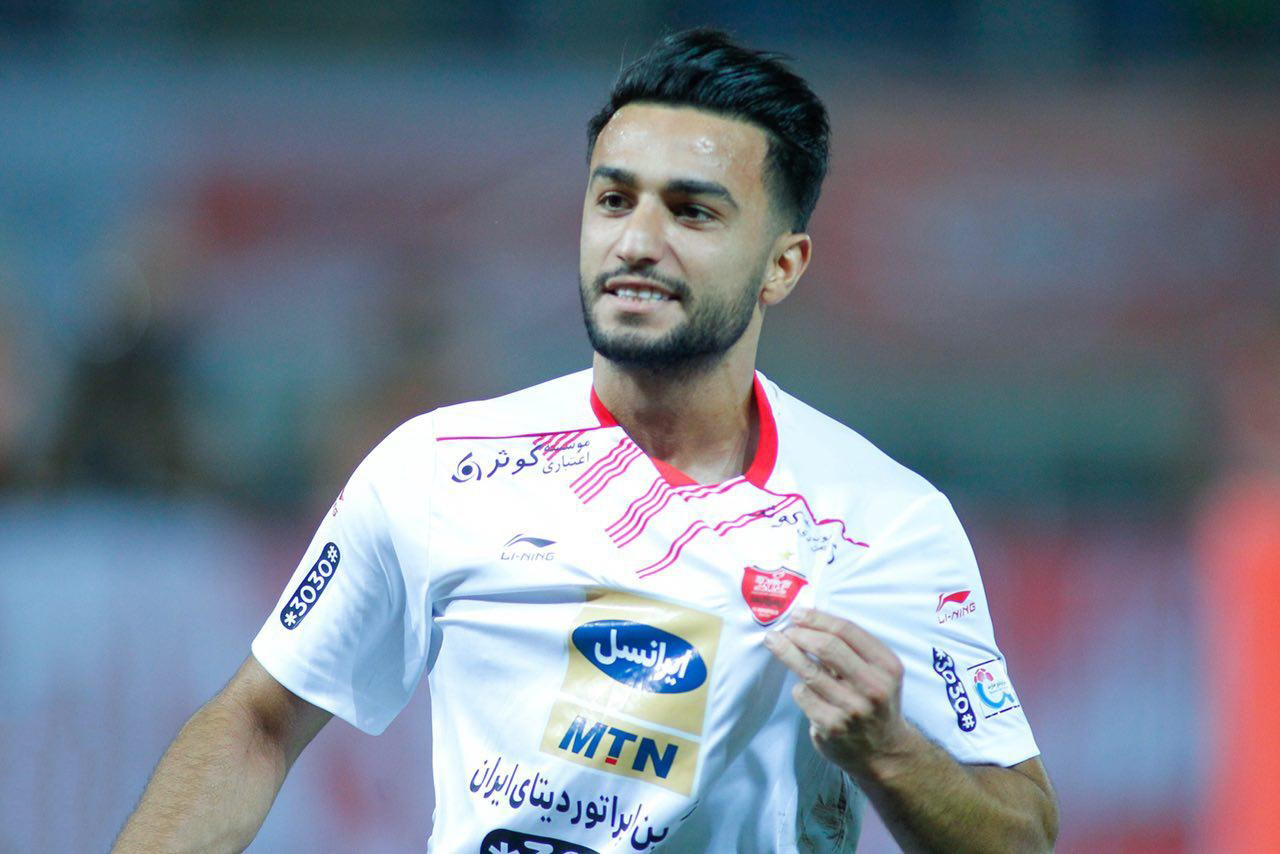

Personal information
- Date of birth: 17 April 1994 (age 32)
- Place of birth: Tehran, Iran
- Height: 1.75 m (5 ft 9 in)
- Positions: Midfielder; right back

Team information
- Current team: Gol Gohar
- Number: 88

Youth career
- 2006–2010: Saipa
- 2010–2012: Steel Azin
- 2012–2014: Moghavemat Tehran

Senior career*
Years	Team	Apps	(Gls)
2014–2017	Paykan	75	(9)
2017–2023	Persepolis	121	(13)
2023–2024	Tractor	23	(3)
2024–2025	Nassaji	26	(0)
2025–	Gol Gohar	11	(0)

International career
2020–2021	Iran	3	(0)
- * Club domestic league appearances and goals as of 17 April 2025

Siamak Nemati (Persian: سیامک نعمتی; born 17 April 1994) is an Iranian professional footballer who plays as a right midfielder and right back for Gol Gohar in Persian Gulf Pro League.

He showed his best performance when playing as a right midfielder.

== Club career ==
=== Early years ===
Nemati had started his career with Saipa, and eventually joined their first team. He was part of the Steel Azin squad in 2011–12 Iran Football's 2nd Division and scored 4 times. He joined Moghavemat Tehran U21 in 2012 and spent two seasons with them. He helped Moghavemat to win the 2013–14 Tehran Asia Vision U21 Premier League.

=== Paykan ===
Nemati joined Paykan in summer 2014. He made his debut for Paykan on 14 August 2014 against Naft MIS as a starter.

=== Persepolis ===
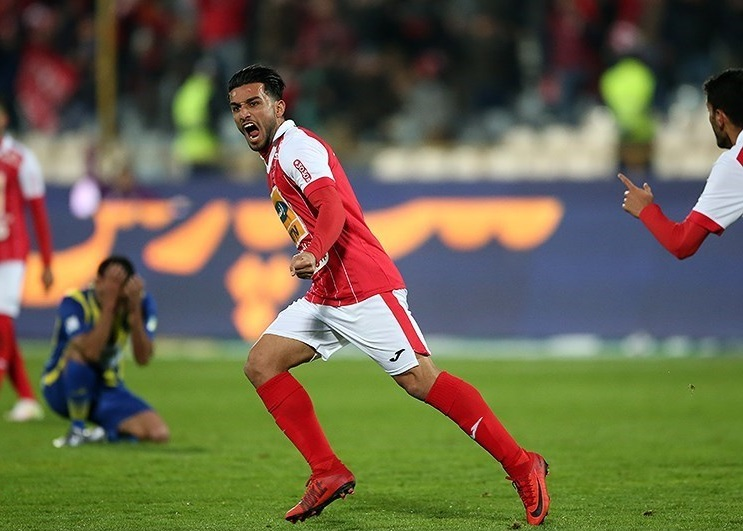
Nemati playing for Persepolis in 2018

On 7 June 2017, Nemati joined Persian Gulf Pro League champions Persepolis on a two-year contract. He won the 2017–18 league in his first season at Persepolis. He was sent off in a 2–0 lost against Kashima in 2018 ACL First-leg and missed the second-leg match in Tehran. In his second year, Nemati showed his versatility by playing in different positions and scored 6 goals for the team.

On 1 July 2023, He left the team after 6 years.

== International ==
On 8 October 2020, He made his debut for Team Melli against Uzbekistan.

== Personal life ==
On 2 February 2026, Nemati criticized an IRIB Ofogh comedy show host who mocked protesters killed during the 2025–2026 Iranian protests, saying: "You are not Iranian at all. Shame on us that you are using our mother tongue to rub salt on the wounds of our mothers."

== Club career statistics ==
As of 21 June 2024

Club	Division	Season	League		Hazfi Cup		Asia		Other		Total	
Club	Division	Season	Apps	Goals	Apps	Goals	Apps	Goals	Apps	Goals	Apps	Goals
Paykan	Pro League	2014–15	15	0	0	0	—		—		15	0
Paykan	Division 1	2015–16	32	3	1	0	—		—		33	3
Paykan	Pro League	2016–17	28	6	1	0	—		—		29	6
Paykan	Total		75	9	2	0	—		—		77	9
Persepolis	Pro League	2017–18	23	2	3	0	13	1	1	0	40	3
Persepolis	Pro League	2018–19	27	5	5	0	5	1	—		37	6
Persepolis	Pro League	2019–20	21	1	2	0	0	0	—		23	1
Persepolis	Pro League	2020–21	24	2	2	0	13	0	1	0	40	2
Persepolis	Pro League	2021–22	13	3	2	1	2	0	0	0	17	4
Persepolis	Pro League	2022–23	13	0	2	1	—		—		15	1
Persepolis	Total		121	13	16	2	33	2	2	0	172	17
Tractor	Pro League	2023–24	23	3	3	0	1	0	—		27	3
Career Total			219	25	21	2	34	2	2	0	276	29

== Honours ==
Persepolis

- Persian Gulf Pro League (5): 2017–18, 2018–19, 2019–20, 2020–21, 2022–23
- Hazfi Cup (1): 2018–19
- Iranian Super Cup (4): 2017, 2018, 2019, 2020; Runner-Up (1): 2021
- AFC Champions League Runner-Up (2): 2018, 2020

Individual

- AFC Champions League Fans' Best XI: 2018
