= Moslem Mojademi =

Iranian footballer

Personal information
- Date of birth: 6 July 1996 (age 30)
- Place of birth: Shadegan, Iran
- Height: 1.78 m (5 ft 10 in)
- Position: Central midfielder

Team information
- Current team: Sanat Naft
- Number: 32

Youth career
- 2014–2015: Sanat Naft

Senior career*
Years	Team	Apps	(Gls)
2015–2020	Sanat Naft	59	(0)
2020–2021	Muaither	4	(1)
2021	Paykan	0	(0)
2021–2023	Naft Masjed Soleyman	58	(0)
2024	Khooshe Talaee	5	(0)
2024–2025	Mes Kerman	13	(0)
2025–	Sanat Naft	0	(0)
- * Club domestic league appearances and goals as of 21 April 2025

Moslem Mojademi (Persian: مسلم مجدمی; born 6 July 1996) is an Iranian professional football midfielder for Azadegan League club Sanat Naft.

== Club career ==
=== Sanat Naft Abadan ===
He made his debut for Sanat Naft (in Persian Gulf Pro League) on 2 December 2016 against Siah Jamegan as a starter.

== Career statistics ==
As of 24 August 2021

Club	Division	Season	League		National Cup		Other		Total	
Club	Division	Season	Apps	Goals	Apps	Goals	Apps	Goals	Apps	Goals
Sanat Naft	Azadegan League	2015–16	6	0	—		—		6	0
Sanat Naft	Persian Gulf Pro League	2016–17	5	0	0	0	—		5	0
Sanat Naft	Persian Gulf Pro League	2017–18	11	0	2	0	—		13	0
Sanat Naft	Persian Gulf Pro League	2018–19	14	0	2	0	—		16	0
Sanat Naft	Persian Gulf Pro League	2019–20	24	0	2	0	—		26	0
Sanat Naft	Total		60	0	6	0	—		66	0
Muaither	Qatari Second Division	2020–21	12	1	—		—		12	1
Paykan	Persian Gulf Pro League	2020–21	0	0	0	0	—		0	0
Naft Masjed Soleyman	Persian Gulf Pro League	2020–21	11	0	—		—		11	0
Career total			83	1	6	0	—		89	1
