= 2018–19 Hazfi Cup =

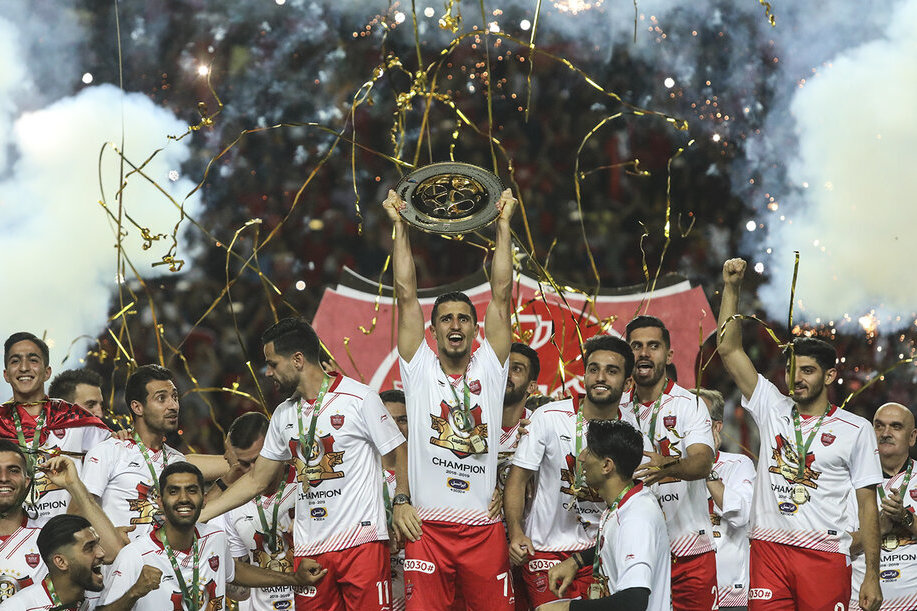
- Persepolis team holds the Hazfi Cup trophy

Tournament details
- Country: Iran
- Dates: 14 August 2018 – 2 June 2019
- Teams: 62

Final positions
- Champions: Persepolis (6th title)
- Runners-up: Damash Gilan

Tournament statistics
- Matches played: 56
- Goals scored: 178 (3.18 per match)
- Top goal scorer: (Iran) Shervin Bozorg (6 goals)

The 2018–19 Hazfi Cup was the 32nd season of the Iranian football knockout competition.

The final was played at the Foolad Arena in Ahvaz on 2 June 2019 between Damash Gilan and Persepolis which Persepolis won 1–0 and with it their second double after 20 years.

== Participating teams ==
A total of 62 teams participated in the 2018–19 Hazfi Cup. The teams were divided into three main groups, and included 16 teams of the Persian Gulf Pro League, and 16 teams of Azadegan League.

== First stage ==
=== First round ===
Number of teams per tier entering this round
Pro League (1)	1. division (2)	2. division (3)	Provincial Leagues (4)	Total
16 / 16	10 / 18	13 / 28	19 / 31	58 / 93

14 August 2018 1	Farhang Alborz	(w/o)	Dehyari Ghaenat
Note: Dehyari Ghaenat Kish withdrew

14 August 2018 1	Persepolis Mahabad	(w/o)	Ghaem Kangavar
Note: Farhang Mahabad withdrew

14 August 2018 1	Siraf Kangan	3–2	Latifi Larestan	Bandar Kangan

=== Second round ===
Number of teams per tier entering this round
Pro League (1)	1. division (2)	2. division (3)	Provincial Leagues (4)	Total
16 / 16	10 / 18	13 / 28	16 / 31	55 / 93

25 August 2018 2	Shahin Bandar Anzali	1–0	Rastegardandi Zanjan	Bandar Anzali

25 August 2018 2	Shahin Sazeh	2–1	Sepehr Azerbaijan	Tehran

25 August 2018 2	Shahin Lordegan	(w/o)	Shahin Asar Baghershahr
Note: Shahin Asar Baghershahr withdrew

25 August 2018 2	Mes Novin	5–0	Shayaneh Baneh	Kerman

25 August 2018 2	Iranjavan Bushehr	(w/o)	Siraf Kangan
Note: Iranjavan withdrew

26 August 2018 2	Esteghlal Baghshan	3–5	Moghavemat Tehran	Baghshan

27 August 2018 2	Khooshe Talaee	1–2	Damash Gilan	Saveh
			Bagherpasand 36'; Heydari 65'	Stadium: Shahid Chamran

27 August 2018 2	Chooka Talesh	9–0	Farhang Alborz	Talesh
				Stadium: Pouria Vali

27 August 2018 2	Besat Kermanshah	(w/o)	Mes Shahr-e Babak
Note: Mes Shahr Babak withdrew

27 August 2018 2	Shohaday Roudbar Kerman	(w/o)	Persepolis Ganaveh
Note: Persepolis Ganaveh withdrew

27 August 2018 2	Padideh Malekhshahi	(w/o)	Shahrdari Bam
Note: Shahrdari Bam withdrew

27 August 2018 2	Setareh Caspian Babol	3–1	Aria Sangsar	Babol

27 August 2018 2	Sardar Bukan	(w/o)	Niroye Zamini
Note: Niroye Zamini withdrew

27 August 2018 2	Foolad Novin	7–0	Ghaem Kangavar	Ahvaz

=== Third round ===
Number of teams per tier entering this round
Pro League (1)	1. division (2)	2. division (3)	Provincial Leagues (4)	Total
16 / 16	10 / 18	7 / 28	7 / 31	40 / 93

1 September 2018 3	Mes Novin	0–2	Mes Shahr-e Babak	Kerman
17:30 DST+04:30

1 September 2018 3	Moghavemat Tehran	3–2	Fajr Sepasi	Tehran
16:30 DST+04:30

1 September 2018 3	Chooka Talesh	1–1 (a.e.t.) (4–3 p)	Baadraan	Talesh
16:30 DST+04:30

1 September 2018 3	Mes Kerman	5–0	Sam Hirmand	Kerman
16:30 DST+04:30

1 September 2018 3	Khooneh be Khooneh	0–0 (6–5 p)	Shahin Bushehr	Babol

1 September 2018 3	Shahrdari Mahshahr	2–1	Foolad Novin	Mahshahr

1 September 2018 3	Damash Gilan	1–0	Qashqai	Rasht

2 September 2018 3	Shahin Saze	2–2 (a.e.t.) (3–5 p)	Setareh Caspian Babol	Ilam
17:30 DST+04:30

== Second stage ==
=== Bracket ===
Fourth round (round of 32); 12 September 2018–18 October 2018
Paykan	0 (5)
Pars Jonoubi Jam (p)	0 (6)
Setareh Caspian Babol	1
Machine Sazi	2
Sorkhpooshan Pakdasht	0
Moghavemat Tehran	1
Chooka Talesh	0 (3)
Damash Gilan (p)	0 (4)
Esteghlal Khuzestan	2
Shahin Bandar Anzali	0
Sanat Naft (p)	3 (4)
Tractor Sazi	3 (3)
Naft Masjed Soleyman	0
Esteghlal Tehran (a.e.t.)	1
Saipa	2
Sardar Bukan	1
Padideh Malekhshahi	0
Mes Kerman	5
Siraf Kangan	1
Khooneh be Khooneh	0
Sepahan	3
Shahrdari Mahshahr	1
Nassaji	5
Shahin Lordegan	0
Malavan	0
Sepidrood	1
Persepolis	1
Navad Urmia	0
Zob Ahan	1
Padideh	2
Foolad	7
Mes Shahr-e Babak	0

Fifth round (round of 16); 4 October 2018–31 January 2019
Pars Jonoubi Jam	1
Machine Sazi	2
Moghavemat Tehran	0
Damash Gilan	2
Esteghlal Khuzestan	2
Sanat Naft	5
Esteghlal Tehran	2 (1)
Saipa (p)	2 (3)
Mes Kerman	5
Siraf Kangan	2
Sepahan (p)	1 (4)
Nassaji	1 (3)
Sepidrood	0
Persepolis	1
Padideh (a.e.t.)	3
Foolad	2

Sixth round (quarter-final); 31 October–7 December 2018
Machine Sazi	1 (2)
Damash Gilan (p)	1 (3)
Sanat Naft	1
Saipa (a.e.t.)	3
Sepahan (p)	0 (9)
Mes Kerman	0 (8)
Persepolis (p)	1 (3)
Padideh	1 (1)

Semi-Final; 29 January 2019–29 May 2019
Damash Gilan	2
Saipa	1
Sepahan	0
Persepolis (a.e.t.)	1

Final; 2 June 2019
Damash Gilan	0
Persepolis	1

=== Fourth round (round of 32) ===
The 16 teams from Iran Pro League entered the competition from the second stage.

Number of teams per tier entering this round
Pro League (1)	1. division (2)	2. division (3)	Provincial Leagues (4)	Total
16 / 16	6 / 18	5 / 28	5 / 31	32 / 93

12 September 2018 4	Esteghlal Khuzestan	2–0	Shahin Bandar Anzali	Ahvaz
18:50 DST+04:30

13 September 2018 4	Zob Ahan	1–2	Padideh	Fuladshahr
18:30 DST+04:30

13 September 2018 4	Saipa	2–1	Sardar Bukan	Tehran
18:40 DST+04:30

14 September 2018 4	Malavan	0–1	Sepidrood	Anzali
16:30 DST+04:30

14 September 2018 4	Setareh Caspian Babol	1–2	Machine Sazi	Babol
17:00 DST+04:30

14 September 2018 4	Siraf Kangan	1–0	Khooneh be Khooneh	Bandar Kangan
17:00 DST+04:30

14 September 2018 4	Padideh Malekshahi	0–5	Mes Kerman	Ilam
17:00 DST+04:30

14 September 2018 4	Sepahan	3–1	Shahrdari Mahshahr	Isfahan
17:30 DST+04:30

14 September 2018 4	Paykan	0–0 (a.e.t.) (5–6 p)	Pars Jonoubi Jam	Shahr-e Qods
18:40 DST+04:30

14 September 2018 4	Sanat Naft	3–3 (a.e.t.) (4–3 p)	Tractor Sazi	Abadan
20:00 DST+04:30

15 September 2018 4	Chooka Talesh	0–0 (a.e.t.) (3–4 p)	Damash	Talesh
16:30 DST+04:30				Stadium: Pouria Vali

15 September 2018 4	Sorkhpooshan Pakdasht	0–1	Moghavemat Tehran	Pakdasht
16:30 DST+04:30

15 September 2018 4	Foolad	7–0	Mes Shahr-e Babak	Ahvaz
16:30 DST+04:30

17 September 2018 4	Nassaji	5–0	Shahin Lordegan	Qaem Shahr
16:30 DST+04:30				Attendance: 8,000

2 October 2018 4	Naft Masjed Soleyman	0–1 (a.e.t.)	Esteghlal Tehran	Masjed Soleyman
DST+04:30			Rouhollah Bagheri	Attendance: 12,000

18 October 2018 4	Persepolis	1–0	Navad Urmia	Tehran
DST+04:30	Ansari 59' (yellow card) 55'; Alipour (yellow card) 74'; Nemati (yellow card) 88'			Stadium: Azadi Stadium; Attendance: 5,000; Referee: Shahou Aslani

=== Fifth round (round of 16) ===
Number of teams per tier entering this round
Pro League (1)	1. division (2)	2. division (3)	Provincial Leagues (4)	Total
12 / 16	1 / 18	2 / 28	1 / 31	16 / 93

4 October 2018 5	Moghavemat Tehran	0–2	Damash	Tehran

4 October 2018 5	Esteghlal Khuzestan	2–5	Sanat Naft	Ahvaz
				Attendance: 1,000

5 October 2018 5	Mes Kerman	5–2	Siraf Kangan	Kerman

5 October 2018 5	Sepahan	1–1 (a.e.t.) (4–3 p)	Nassaji	Isfahan
				Attendance: 10,000

5 October 2018 5	Padideh	3–2 (a.e.t.)	Foolad	Mashhad
				Attendance: 5,500

6 October 2018 5	Pars Jonoubi Jam	1–2	Machine Sazi	Jam

1 November 2018 5	Esteghlal	2–2 (a.e.t.) (1–3 p)	Saipa	Tehran
				Attendance: 12,000

31 January 2019 5	Sepidrood	0–1	Persepolis	Rasht
	Alireza Nourmohammadi (yellow card) 30'		Karimi 90+3'; Rafiei (yellow card) 74'; Khalilzadeh (yellow card) 85'	Stadium: Sardar Jangal Stadium

=== Sixth round (quarter-final) ===
Number of teams per tier entering this round
Pro League (1)	1. division (2)	2. division (3)	Provincial Leagues (4)	Total
6 / 16	1 / 18	1 / 28	0 / 31	8 / 93

31 October 2018 6	Machine Sazi	1–1 (a.e.t.) (2–3 p)	Damash	Tabriz
14:45 DST+04:30				Attendance: 1,300

2 November 2018 6	Mes Kerman	0–0 (a.e.t.) (8–9 p)	Sepahan	Kerman
16:45 DST+04:30				Attendance: 15,000

7 December 2018 6	Sanat Naft	1–3 (a.e.t.)	Saipa	Abadan
				Attendance: 6,000

18 February 2019 6	Persepolis	1–1 (a.e.t.) (3–1 p)	Padideh	Tehran
	Sh. Mosleh 20'		M. Mehdikhani 12'; M. Moradmand (yellow card) 25'; Y. Shakeri (yellow card) 69'; R. Sadri (yellow card) 114'; B. Barzay (yellow card) 120'	Stadium: Azadi Stadium; Attendance: 22.000; Referee: Ashkan Khorshidi
	Penalties
	B. Resan (penalty missed); A. Nourollahi (penalty scored); M. Budimir (penalty scored); M. Shiri (penalty missed); A. Alipour (penalty scored)		B. Barzay (penalty scored); M. Rigi (penalty missed); M. Moradmand (penalty missed); A. Nemati (penalty missed)

=== Seventh round (semi-final) ===
Number of teams per tier entering this round
Pro League (1)	1. division (2)	2. division (3)	Provincial Leagues (4)	Total
3 / 16	0 / 18	1 / 28	0 / 31	4 / 93

29 January 2019 7	Damash	2–1	Saipa	Rasht
DST+04:30				Stadium: Dr. Azodi Stadium

29 May 2019 Semi Final	Sepahan	0–1 (a.e.t.)	Persepolis	Isfahan
21.00 DST +04:30	S. Yazdani (yellow card) 40'; M. Iranpourian (yellow card) 45' (yellow-red card) 99'; Kiros (yellow card) 103' (red card) 105'; M. Kiani (penalty missed) 114'		S. Yazdani 120+1' (o.g.); Sh. Khalilzadeh (yellow card) 40'; S. Rafiei (red card) 105'; A. Beiranvand (yellow card) 120+3'	Stadium: Naghsh-e Jahan Stadium; Attendance: 37,000; Referee: Mohammad Hosein Zahedifard

=== Eighth round (final) ===
Number of teams per tier entering this round
Pro League (1)	1. division (2)	2. division (3)	Provincial Leagues (4)	Total
1 / 16	0 / 18	1 / 28	0 / 31	2 / 93

2 June 2019 Final	Damash	0–1	Persepolis	Ahvaz
21.00 DST +04:30	M. Mokhtari (yellow card) 30'; M. Heydari (yellow card) 76'		A. Alipour 23'; M. Shiri (yellow card) 47'	Stadium: Foolad Arena; Attendance: 30,655; Referee: Mooud Bonyadifar

== See also ==
- Iran Pro League 2018–19
- Azadegan League 2018–19
- Iran Football's 2nd Division 2018–19
- Iran Football's 3rd Division 2018–19
- Iranian Super Cup
