= 2018 Iranian Super Cup =

| Persepolis | Esteghlal |
| Persian Gulf Pro League | Hazfi Cup |
| 3 | 0 |
- Esteghlal withdrew from the match.
- Date: 20 July 2018
- Venue: Azadi Stadium, Tehran

The 2018 Iranian Super Cup was the 4th Iranian Super Cup, scheduled to be played on July 20, 2018, between the 2017–18 Persian Gulf Pro League champions Persepolis and the 2017–18 Hazfi Cup champions Esteghlal. The result of match awarded 3-0 in favor of Persepolis, because of Esteghlal match withdrawal.

== Match ==
20 July 2018
20:45

| Persepolis | 3–0 | Esteghlal |

Azadi Stadium, Tehran
