= 2019 Iranian Super Cup =

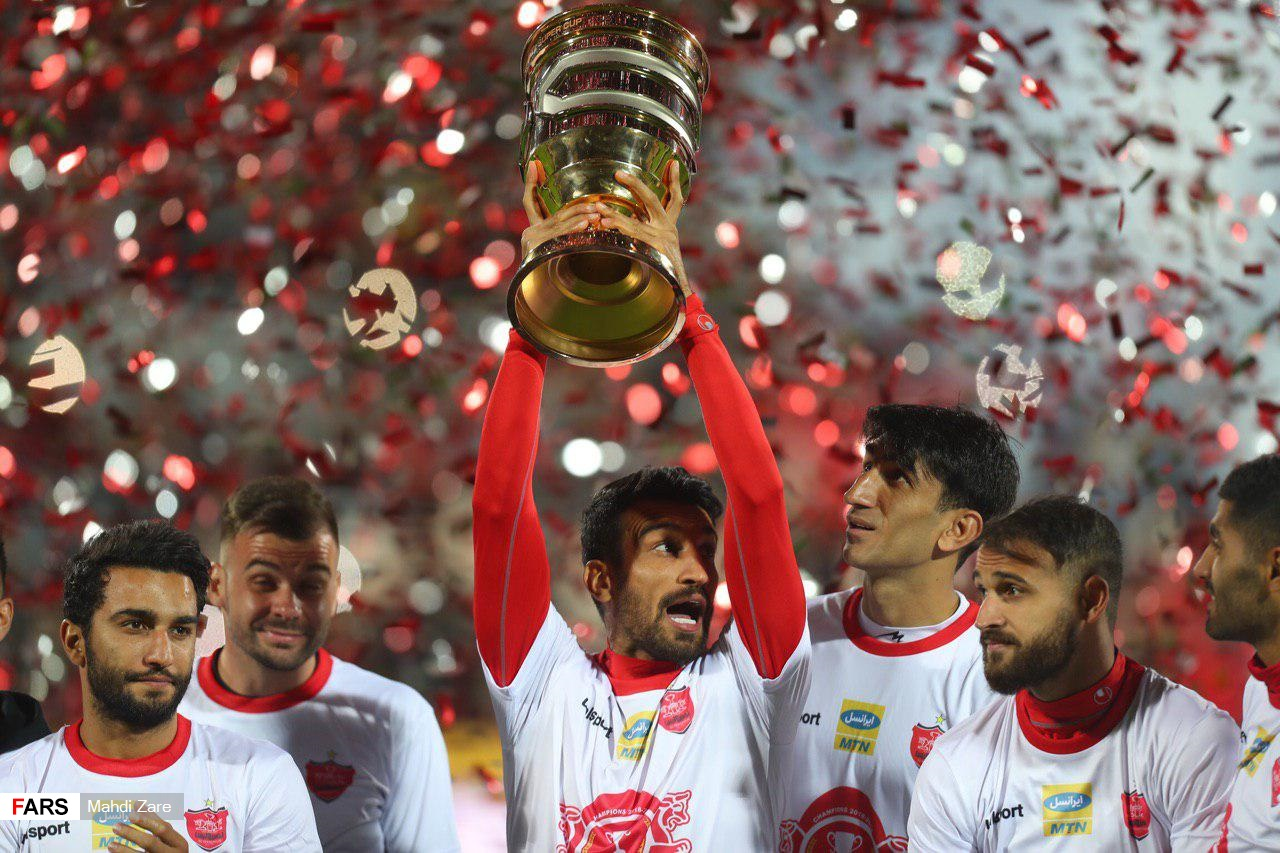
- Persepolis claimed Iran’s Super Cup.

The 2019 Iranian Super Cup was the 5th Iranian Super Cup an annual football match played between the winners of the previous season's Persian Gulf Pro League and winner of Hazfi Cup. Persepolis won the 2019 Persian Gulf Pro League and 2019 Hazfi Cup, so Iran Football Association announced that Persepolis is the 2019 Super Cup winner.
