= List of Iranian football transfers summer 2017 =

This is a list of Iranian football transfers for the 2017 summer transfer window. Transfers of Iran Pro League and Azadegan League are listed. Transfer window was opened on June 15, 2017, and will be open until September 6, 2017, for players who played in Iranian clubs.

The Iranian Football Clubs who participate in 2017–18 Iranian football different levels are allowed to have up to maximum 57 players in their player lists, which will be categorized in the following groups:

- Up to maximum 18 adult (without any age limit) players
- Up to maximum 9 under-23 players (i.e. the player whose birth is after 1 January 1995).
- Up to maximum 15 under-21 players (i.e. the player whose birth is after 1 January 1997).
- Up to maximum 15 under-19 players (i.e. the player whose birth is after 1 January 1999).

== Iran Pro League ==
=== Rules and regulations ===
According to Iran Football Federation rules for 2017–18 Iran Pro League, each Football Club is allowed to take up to maximum 6 new Iranian player from the other clubs who already played in the 2016–17 Iran Pro League season. In addition to these six new players, each club is allowed to take up to maximum 4 non-Iranian new players (at least one of them should be Asian) and up to 3 players from Free agent (who did not play in 2017–18 Iran Pro League season or doesn't list in any 2017–18 League after season's start) during the season. In addition to these players, the clubs are also able to take some new under-23 and under-21 years old players, if they have some free place in these categories in their player lists. Under-23 players should sign in transfer window but under-21 can be signed during the first mid-season.

=== Esteghlal ===
Head coach: (Iran) Alireza Mansourian
Remaining Pro League quota: 2

In: Note: Flags indicate national team as defined under FIFA eligibility rules; some limited exceptions apply. Players may hold more than one non-FIFA nationality.

No.	Pos.	Nation	Player
16	MF	IRN	Mehdi Ghaedi (from Iranjavan)
27	MF	IRN	Hossein Heydari (from Mes Vision Asia)
7	FW	IRN	Hassan Beyt Saeed^{PL} (from Esteghlal Khuzestan)
10	FW	IRN	Sajjad Shahbazzadeh^{PL} (from Naft Tehran)
4	MF	IRN	Roozbeh Cheshmi (from Free agent)
23	MF	IRN	Dariush Shojaeian^{PL} (from Gostaresh Foulad)
13	DF	IRN	Armin Sohrabian^{PL} (from Sepahan)
33	DF	IRN	Pejman Montazeri (from (Qatar) Al-Ahli)
8	MF	IRN	Mojtaba Jabari (from (Qatar) Al-Ahli)
70	FW	IRN	Mohammad Javad Mohammadi (from Haf Semnan)
—	FW	IRN	Sajjad Aghaei (from Persepolis)
—	MF	IRN	Amir Hossein Sheikholeslami (from Zob Ahan)
20	MF	UZB	Server Djeparov (Loan return from Sepahan)

Out: Note: Flags indicate national team as defined under FIFA eligibility rules; some limited exceptions apply. Players may hold more than one non-FIFA nationality.

No.	Pos.	Nation	Player
5	DF	IRN	Hossein Kanaanizadegan (to Saipa)
3	DF	BRA	Róbson (Loan return to (Brazil) Bahia)
74	MF	IRN	Mojtaba Haghdoust (Loan return to Naft Tehran)
31	DF	IRN	Alireza Sayyar (Released)
20	DF	IRN	Taha Shariati (to Saipa)
27	MF	IRN	Hossein Abarghouei (to Gostaresh Foulad)
13	MF	IRN	Miad Yazdani (on loan to Sepidrood Rasht)
9	FW	IRN	Kaveh Rezaei (to (Belgium) Charleroi)
77	FW	IRN	Behnam Barzay (Released)
28	MF	IRN	Mohsen Karimi (Released)
—	GK	IRN	Mehrdad Lashni (to Mes Rafsanjan)
—	MF	IRN	Sina Khadempour (on loan to Naft Tehran)

=== Esteghlal Khuzestan ===
Head coach: (Iran) Abdollah Veisi
Remaining Pro League quota: 1

In: Note: Flags indicate national team as defined under FIFA eligibility rules; some limited exceptions apply. Players may hold more than one non-FIFA nationality.

No.	Pos.	Nation	Player
—	MF	IRN	Abbas Bouazar^{PL} (from Naft Tehran)
—	MF	IRN	Taleb Reykani^{PL} (from Sepahan)
—	FW	IRN	Hakim Nassari^{PL} (from Sanat Naft)
—	MF	IRN	Meysam Doraghi^{PL} (from Foolad Khuzestan)
—	DF	MLI	Moussa Coulibaly^{PL} (from Sepahan)

Out: Note: Flags indicate national team as defined under FIFA eligibility rules; some limited exceptions apply. Players may hold more than one non-FIFA nationality.

No.	Pos.	Nation	Player
—	MF	IRN	Mehdi Momeni (to Paykan)
—	DF	IRN	Danial Mahini (to Saipa)
—	FW	IRN	Hassan Beyt Saeed (to Esteghlal)
—	DF	IRN	Mohammad Tayyebi (to Pars Jonoubi Jam)
—	MF	IRN	Mehdi Zobeydi (to Pars Jonoubi Jam)
—	FW	IRN	Farshad Salarvand (to Pars Jonoubi Jam)
—	DF	IRN	Peyman Shirzadi (to Foolad Khuzestan)
—	MF	IRN	Ali Asghar Ashouri (to Foolad Khuzestan)
—	DF	IRN	Ali Daghagheleh (to Fajr Sepasi)
—	FW	IRN	Farshad Janfaza (Released)

=== Foolad ===
Head coach: (Iran) Sirous Pourmousavi
Remaining Pro League quota: 1

In: Note: Flags indicate national team as defined under FIFA eligibility rules; some limited exceptions apply. Players may hold more than one non-FIFA nationality.

No.	Pos.	Nation	Player
—	MF	IRN	Iman Mobali^{PL} (from Naft Tehran)
—	FW	IRN	Rahim Zahivi (from (Qatar) Al Shahania)
—	DF	IRN	Peyman Shirzadi^{PL} (from Esteghlal Khuzestan)
—	MF	IRN	Ali Asghar Ashouri^{PL} (from Esteghlal Khuzestan)
—	GK	IRN	Hamed Lak^{PL} (from Saipa)
—	MF	IRN	Amir Zaleykani^{PL} (from Sanat Naft)

Out: Note: Flags indicate national team as defined under FIFA eligibility rules; some limited exceptions apply. Players may hold more than one non-FIFA nationality.

No.	Pos.	Nation	Player
3	FW	IRN	Sasan Ansari (to Sepahan)
—	MF	IRN	Esmaeil Sharifat (to Zob Ahan)
—	DF	IRN	Mehrdad Jama'ati (to Sepidrood)
—	MF	IRN	Hamid Bou Hamdan (to Zob Ahan)
—	MF	IRN	Bakhtiar Rahmani (to Paykan)

=== Gostaresh Foulad ===
Head coach: (Croatia) Luka Bonačić
Remaining Pro League quota: 1

In: Note: Flags indicate national team as defined under FIFA eligibility rules; some limited exceptions apply. Players may hold more than one non-FIFA nationality.

No.	Pos.	Nation	Player
—	MF	GEO	Kakhaber Kakashvili^{PL} (from Machine Sazi)
—	DF	IRN	Mohammad Amin Hajmohammadi^{PL} (from Machine Sazi)
—	DF	IRN	Mehrdad Ghanbari^{PL} (from Zob Ahan)
—	DF	IRN	Milad Fakhredini^{PL} (from Naft Tehran)
—	DF	SRB	Dragan Žarković (from (Serbia) Napredak Kruševac)
—	MF	IRN	Andranik Teymourian^{PL} (from Naft Tehran)

Out: Note: Flags indicate national team as defined under FIFA eligibility rules; some limited exceptions apply. Players may hold more than one non-FIFA nationality.

No.	Pos.	Nation	Player
—	MF	IRN	Morteza Asadi (to Sanat Naft)
—	DF	IRN	Babak Hatami (to Padideh)
—	MF	IRN	Dariush Shojaeian (to Esteghlal)
—	MF	BRA	Magno Batista (to Sanat Naft)
—	FW	BRA	Luciano Pereira (to Sanat Naft)
—	DF	IRN	Mohsen Hosseini (to Sepidrood)
—	DF	IRN	Mostafa Ekrami (Released)
—	DF	IRN	Mohammad Nosrati (Released)

=== Naft Tehran ===
Head coach: (Iran) Hamid Derakhshan
Remaining Pro League quota: 4

In: Note: Flags indicate national team as defined under FIFA eligibility rules; some limited exceptions apply. Players may hold more than one non-FIFA nationality.

No.	Pos.	Nation	Player
—	MF	IRN	Mojtaba Haghdoust (Loan return from Esteghlal)
—	MF	IRN	Mohammad Hossein Mehrazma (from Pars Jonoubi)
—	FW	IRN	Mehdi Daghagheleh (from Mes Kerman)
—	FW	IRN	Amin Manouchehri (from Nassaji Mazandaran)
—	MF	IRN	Payam Sadeghian^{PL} (from Machine Sazi)
—	MF	IRN	Hamidreza Ali Asgari^{PL} (from Machine Sazi)
—	MF	IRN	Sina Khadempour (on loan from Esteghlal)

Out: Note: Flags indicate national team as defined under FIFA eligibility rules; some limited exceptions apply. Players may hold more than one non-FIFA nationality.

No.	Pos.	Nation	Player
—	MF	IRN	Arash Rezavand (to Saipa)
—	MF	IRN	Reza Asadi (to Saipa)
—	DF	IRN	Reza Aliari (to Saipa)
—	DF	IRN	Mohammad Daneshgar (to Saipa)
—	MF	IRN	Abbas Bouazar (to Esteghlal Khuzestan)
—	MF	IRN	Iman Mobali (to Foolad Khuzestan)
—	FW	IRN	Sajjad Shahbazzadeh (to Esteghlal)
—	DF	IRN	Sina Khadempour (to Esteghlal)
—	MF	IRN	Akbar Sadeghi (to Padideh)
—	DF	IRN	Milad Fakhredini (to Gostaresh Foulad)
—	MF	IRN	Tohid Gholami (to Sepidrood Rasht)
—	FW	IRN	Mohammad Ghazi (to Padideh)
—	MF	IRN	Andranik Teymourian (to Gostaresh Foulad)

=== Padideh ===
Head coach: (Iran) Mohammad Reza Mohajeri
Remaining Pro League quota: 0

In: Note: Flags indicate national team as defined under FIFA eligibility rules; some limited exceptions apply. Players may hold more than one non-FIFA nationality.

No.	Pos.	Nation	Player
—	DF	IRN	Babak Hatami^{PL} (from Gostaresh Foolad)
—	FW	IRN	Amin Ghaseminejad^{PL} (from Machine Sazi)
—	MF	IRN	Akbar Sadeghi^{PL} (from Naft Tehran)
—	FW	IRN	Mohammadreza Khalatbari^{PL} (from Saipa)
—	FW	IRN	Mohammad Ghazi^{PL} (from Naft Tehran)
—	DF	IRN	Mohammadreza Khanzadeh^{PL} (from Siah Jamegan)
—	MF	IRN	Mohammad Aghajanpour (from Aluminium Arak)

Out: Note: Flags indicate national team as defined under FIFA eligibility rules; some limited exceptions apply. Players may hold more than one non-FIFA nationality.

No.	Pos.	Nation	Player
—	DF	IRN	Hassan Jafari (to Sepahan)
—	MF	IRN	Karim Ahmadi (to Siah Jamegan)
—	FW	IRN	Younes Shakeri (to Siah Jamegan)
—	GK	IRN	Mojtaba Roshangar (to Nassaji Mazandaran)
—	DF	ARM	Varazdat Haroyan (to (Russia) Ural Yekaterinburg)
—	FW	IRN	Hossein Zamehran (Released)

=== Pars Jonoubi Jam ===
Head coach: (Iran) Mehdi Tartar
Remaining Pro League quota: 1^{No.PL}

In: Note: Flags indicate national team as defined under FIFA eligibility rules; some limited exceptions apply. Players may hold more than one non-FIFA nationality.

No.	Pos.	Nation	Player
—	MF	IRN	Mehdi Abdi (from Kheybar Khorramabad)
—	MF	IRN	Meysam Naghizadeh (from Khoneh Be Khoneh)
—	MF	IRN	Vahed Bakhshi (from Rah Ahan)
—	GK	IRN	Mohsen Forouzan^{PL} (from Saba Qom)
—	DF	IRN	Mohammad Tayyebi^{PL} (from Esteghlal Khuzestan)
—	MF	IRN	Mehdi Zobeydi^{PL} (from Esteghlal Khuzestan)
—	FW	IRN	Farshad Salarvand^{PL} (from Esteghlal Khuzestan)
—	DF	IRN	Ahmad Gouhari^{U23} (from Saipa)
—	FW	IRN	Yaser Feyzi^{PL} (from Zob Ahan)
—	GK	BRA	Alessandro Felipe^{PL} (from Saipa)

Out: Note: Flags indicate national team as defined under FIFA eligibility rules; some limited exceptions apply. Players may hold more than one non-FIFA nationality.

No.	Pos.	Nation	Player
92	GK	IRN	Davoud Noushi Soufiani (to Sanat Naft)
5	DF	IRN	Mahmoud Khamisi (to Baadraan Tehran)
—	MF	IRN	Kazem Hayat Bakhsh (Released)

=== Paykan ===
Head coach: (Iran) Majid Jalali
Remaining Pro League quota: 3

In: Note: Flags indicate national team as defined under FIFA eligibility rules; some limited exceptions apply. Players may hold more than one non-FIFA nationality.

No.	Pos.	Nation	Player
—	MF	IRN	Mehdi Momeni^{PL} (from Esteghlal Khuzestan)
—	MF	IRN	Hojjat Haghverdi^{PL} (from Zob Ahan)
—	MF	IRN	Bakhtiar Rahmani^{PL} (from Foolad)

Out: Note: Flags indicate national team as defined under FIFA eligibility rules; some limited exceptions apply. Players may hold more than one non-FIFA nationality.

No.	Pos.	Nation	Player
—	FW	NGA	Godwin Mensha (to Persepolis)
—	MF	IRN	Siamak Nemati (to Persepolis)
—	DF	IRN	Siavash Yazdani (to Sepahan)
—	FW	IRN	Shahriar Moghanlou (Released)
—	GK	IRN	Hojjat Sedghi (Released)

=== Persepolis ===
Head coach: (Croatia) Branko Ivanković
Remaining Pro League quota: 3

In: Note: Flags indicate national team as defined under FIFA eligibility rules; some limited exceptions apply. Players may hold more than one non-FIFA nationality.

No.	Pos.	Nation	Player
14	FW	IRN	Shahab Zahedi (Loan return from Machine Sazi)
29	MF	IRN	Mohammad Rahmati (Loan return from Machine Sazi)
3	DF	IRN	Shoja' Khalilzadeh^{PL} (from Sepahan)
90	FW	NGA	Godwin Mensha^{PL} (from Paykan)
88	MF	IRN	Siamak Nemati^{PL} (from Paykan)
69	DF	IRN	Shayan Mosleh (from Sepidrood)
—	MF	IRQ	Bashar Rasan (from (Iraq) Al-Quwa Al-Jawiya)
—	FW	IRN	Aydin Rezaei (from Saipa Academy)
—	DF	IRN	Ehsan Hosseini (from Persepolis Academy)
—	FW	IRN	Mohammad Amin Asadi (from Persepolis Academy)
—	DF	IRN	Shahin Abbasian (from Foolad Academy)
—	MF	IRN	Adam Hemati (from (Canada) Ryerson Rams)
—	MF	IRN	Saeed Hosseinpour (from Paykan Academy)

Out: Note: Flags indicate national team as defined under FIFA eligibility rules; some limited exceptions apply. Players may hold more than one non-FIFA nationality.

No.	Pos.	Nation	Player
27	DF	IRN	Ramin Rezaeian (to (Belgium) Oostende)
23	DF	IRN	Mohammad Aram Tab (Released)
66	MF	IRN	Shahab Karami (Released)
88	FW	IRN	Saman Nariman Jahan (Released)
28	FW	IRN	Reza Karamolachaab (loan to Esteghlal Khuzestan)
5	DF	IRN	Hamed Aghaei (loan to Naft Tehran)
7	MF	IRN	Soroush Rafiei (to (Qatar) Al-Khor)
14	FW	IRN	Shahab Zahedi (loan to (Iceland) ÍBV)
55	DF	IRN	Aref Mohammadalipour (Released)
29	MF	IRN	Mohammad Rahmati (Released)

=== Saipa ===
Head coach: (Iran) Ali Daei
Remaining Pro League quota: 1

In: Note: Flags indicate national team as defined under FIFA eligibility rules; some limited exceptions apply. Players may hold more than one non-FIFA nationality.

No.	Pos.	Nation	Player
—	DF	IRN	Taha Shariati (from Esteghlal)
—	GK	IRN	Mohammad Reza Akhbari (Loan return from Tractor)
—	FW	IRN	Mohammad Abbaszadeh (from Nassaji Mazandaran)
—	MF	IRN	Arash Rezavand^{PL} (from Naft Tehran)
—	DF	IRN	Reza Aliyari^{PL} (from Naft Tehran)
—	MF	IRN	Reza Asadi^{PL} (from Naft Tehran)
—	DF	IRN	Danial Mahini^{PL} (from Esteghlal Khuzestan)
—	DF	IRN	Mohammad Daneshgar^{PL} (from Naft Tehran)

Out: Note: Flags indicate national team as defined under FIFA eligibility rules; some limited exceptions apply. Players may hold more than one non-FIFA nationality.

No.	Pos.	Nation	Player
—	DF	IRN	Ezzatollah Pourghaz (to Sepahan)
—	FW	IRN	Gholamreza Rezaei (to Sepidrood)
—	FW	IRN	Mohammadreza Khalatbari (to Padideh)
—	DF	IRN	Ahmad Gouhari (to Pars Jonoubi Jam)
—	GK	IRN	Hamed Lak (to Foolad Khuzestan)
—	DF	IRN	Kazem Borjlou (Released)
—	GK	BRA	Alessandro Felipe (to Pars Jonoubi)

=== Sanat Naft ===
Head coach: (Iran) Faraz Kamalvand
Remaining Pro League quota: 0

In: Note: Flags indicate national team as defined under FIFA eligibility rules; some limited exceptions apply. Players may hold more than one non-FIFA nationality.

No.	Pos.	Nation	Player
8	FW	IRN	Hakim Nassari (from Esteghlal Khuzestan)
—	MF	IRN	Morteza Asadi^{PL} (from Gostaresh Foulad)
—	MF	IRQ	Karrar Jassim^{PL} (from Tractor)
—	FW	IRN	Farid Karimi^{PL} (from Sepahan)
—	FW	IRN	Omid Jahanbakhsh^{PL} (from Saba Qom)
—	MF	BRA	Augusto (from (Brazil) Internacional)
—	MF	IRN	Amin Pourali (from Aluminium Arak)
—	GK	IRN	Davoud Noushi Soufiani (from Pars Jonoubi)
—	DF	IRN	Mohammad Vahid Esmaeilbeigi (from Sanat Mes)
—	MF	BRA	Magno Batista^{PL} (from Gostaresh Foulad)
—	FW	BRA	Luciano Pereira^{PL} (from Gostaresh Foulad)
—	MF	IRN	Mohsen Hamidi (from Aluminuim Arak)

Out: Note: Flags indicate national team as defined under FIFA eligibility rules; some limited exceptions apply. Players may hold more than one non-FIFA nationality.

No.	Pos.	Nation	Player
22	GK	IRN	Agil Etemadi (to (Netherlands) De Graafschap)
10	MF	IRN	Amir Zaleykani (to Foolad Khuzestan)
6	MF	KOR	Kim Gwi-hyeon (to (Qatar) Al Ahli SC)
2	DF	NGA	Rasheed Alabi (Released)
14	MF	BRA	Bruno Oliveira (Released)
77	FW	IRQ	Ali Salah Hashim (Released)
4	DF	IRN	Mojtaba Mamashli (Released)
11	MF	IRN	Milad Jahani (Released)
7	MF	IRN	Mohammadreza Pourmohammad (Released)
40	MF	IRN	Bahador Abdi (Released)
24	DF	IRN	Alireza Nourmohammadi (Released)
9	FW	IRN	Reza Norouzi (Released)
13	MF	IRN	Mostafa Ahmadi (Released)

=== Sepahan ===
Head coach: (Croatia) Zlatko Kranjčar
Remaining Pro League quota: 1

In: Note: Flags indicate national team as defined under FIFA eligibility rules; some limited exceptions apply. Players may hold more than one non-FIFA nationality.

No.	Pos.	Nation	Player
35	GK	IRN	Mehdi Sedghian^{U23} (Loan return from Fajr Sepasi)
36	GK	IRN	Ali Keykhosravi^{U21} (from Sepahan U19)
2	DF	IRN	Hassan Jafari^{PL} (from Padideh)
5	DF	IRN	Ezzatollah Pourghaz^{PL} (from Saipa)
7	DF	IRN	Saeid Aghaei^{PL}^{U23} (from Tractor)
33	DF	BRA	Jairo Rodrigues (from (Azerbaijan) Neftçi PFK)
78	DF	IRN	Mehdi Rahimi^{U21} (from Sepahan U19)
99	DF	IRN	Siavash Yazdani^{PL} (from Paykan)
9	MF	IRN	Shahin Saghebi (from Malavan)
14	MF	IRN	Ali Karimi (from (Croatia) Dinamo Zagreb)
18	MF	IRN	Amin Jahan Alian (from Aluminium Arak)
50	MF	BRA	Rafael Crivellaro (from (Portugal) Arouca)
3	FW	IRN	Sasan Ansari^{PL} (from Foolad Khuzestan)
11	FW	IRQ	Marwan Hussein (from (Iraq) Al-Shorta)
40	FW	IRN	Iman Zakizadeh^{U23} (from Sepahan U21)

Out: Note: Flags indicate national team as defined under FIFA eligibility rules; some limited exceptions apply. Players may hold more than one non-FIFA nationality.

No.	Pos.	Nation	Player
22	GK	IRN	Farid Nejat (to Zob Ahan U21)
3	DF	IRN	Shoja' Khalilzadeh (to Persepolis)
5	DF	MLI	Moussa Coulibaly (to Esteghlal Khuzestan)
26	DF	IRN	Ali Ahmadi (to Saba Qom)
28	DF	IRN	Ehsan Hajsafi (to (Greece) Panionios)
33	DF	IRN	Armin Sohrabian (to Esteghlal)
39	DF	IRN	Mohammad Roshandel (to Fajr Sepasi)
88	DF	IRN	Jalal Abdi (to Malavan)
9	MF	IRN	Farid Karimi (to Sanat Naft)
10	MF	IRN	Taleb Reykani (to Esteghlal Khuzestan)
80	MF	UZB	Server Djeparov (Loan return to Esteghlal)
20	FW	IRN	Masoud Kazemayni (to Sepahan U21)

=== Sepidrood ===
Head coach: (Iran) Ali Nazarmohammadi
Remaining Pro League quota: 1^{No.PL}

In: Note: Flags indicate national team as defined under FIFA eligibility rules; some limited exceptions apply. Players may hold more than one non-FIFA nationality.

No.	Pos.	Nation	Player
—	MF	IRN	Hossein Ebrahimi^{PL} (from Machine Sazi)
—	MF	IRN	Miad Yazdani^{PL} (on loan from Esteghlal)
—	FW	IRN	Gholamreza Rezaei^{PL} (from Saipa)
—	DF	IRN	Mehrdad Jama'ati^{PL} (from Foolad Khuzestan)
—	DF	IRN	Mohsen Hosseini^{PL} (from Gostaresh Foulad)
—	MF	IRN	Tohid Gholami^{PL} (from Naft Tehran)

Out: Note: Flags indicate national team as defined under FIFA eligibility rules; some limited exceptions apply. Players may hold more than one non-FIFA nationality.

No.	Pos.	Nation	Player
—	DF	IRN	Shayan Mosleh (to Persepolis)

=== Siah Jamegan ===
Head coach: (Iran) Akbar Misaghian
Remaining Pro League quota: 4

In: Note: Flags indicate national team as defined under FIFA eligibility rules; some limited exceptions apply. Players may hold more than one non-FIFA nationality.

No.	Pos.	Nation	Player
—	MF	IRN	Ehsan Pirhadi (from Mes Rafsanjan F.C.)
—	GK	IRN	Mohammad Hossein Eyn Afshar (from Baadraan Tehran)
—	MF	IRN	Karim Ahmadi^{PL} (from Padideh)
—	?	IRN	Sobhan Khaghani (from ?)
—	MF	IRN	Hossein Madadi (from Aluminium Arak)
—	FW	IRN	Younes Shakeri^{PL} (from Padideh)
—	MF	IRN	Danial Mousavi (from Oxin Alborz)
—	?	IRN	Amir Hossein Salehi (from ?)
—	FW	IRN	Mohammadreza Baouj^{PL} (from Saba Qom)
—	FW	IRN	Behtash Misaghian (from Baadraan Tehran)
—	MF	IRN	Mohammad Mehdi Asgari (from PAS Hamedan)
—	?	IRN	Majid Kiani (from ?)
—	DF	IRN	Soheil Salehi (from Naft va Gaz Gachsaran)
—	?	IRN	Sajjad Danai Baghaki (from ?)
—	?	IRN	Arman Farahmandian (from ?)
—	MF	IRN	Hossein Baharvand (from Kheybar Khorramabad)
—	?	IRN	Nader Ataei (from ?)
—	MF	IRN	Amir Mohammad Panahi (from Oxin Alborz)
—	DF	IRN	Behrouz Afshar (from Baadraan Tehran)
—	FW	IRN	Keivan Amraei (from Saba Qom)
—	DF	CRO	Jure Čolak (from (North Macedonia) KF Shkëndija)

Out: Note: Flags indicate national team as defined under FIFA eligibility rules; some limited exceptions apply. Players may hold more than one non-FIFA nationality.

No.	Pos.	Nation	Player
—	MF	IRN	Mostafa Ahmadi (to Padideh)
—	MF	IRN	Milad Meydavoudi (to Naft Masjed Soleyman)
—	DF	IRN	Meysam Hosseini (Released)
—	FW	IRN	Mohsen Azarpad (Released)
—	MF	IRN	Amir Hossein Hatamlou (Released)
—	FW	IRN	Morteza Ranjbar (Released)
—	FW	IRN	Abbas Asgari (Released)
—	MF	IRN	Salar Afrasiabi (Released)
—	?	IRN	Farshad Hatami (Released)
—	DF	IRN	Mohammad Reza Khanzadeh (to Padideh)
—	GK	IRN	Masoud Homami (Released)

=== Tractor ===
Head coach: (Iran) Yahya Golmohammadi
Remaining Pro League quota: 6

In: Note: Flags indicate national team as defined under FIFA eligibility rules; some limited exceptions apply. Players may hold more than one non-FIFA nationality.

No.	Pos.	Nation	Player

Out: Note: Flags indicate national team as defined under FIFA eligibility rules; some limited exceptions apply. Players may hold more than one non-FIFA nationality.

No.	Pos.	Nation	Player
—	GK	IRN	Mohammad Reza Akhbari (Loan return to Saipa)
—	DF	IRN	Saeid Aghaei (to Sepahan)
—	MF	IRQ	Karrar Jassim (to Sanat Naft)
—	FW	BRA	Éder Luciano (Released)
—	DF	IRN	Mohsen Bengar (Released)
—	DF	IRN	Khaled Shafiei (to (South Korea) FC Seoul)
—	MF	IRN	Mohammad Papi (to Fajr Sepasi)

=== Zob Ahan ===
Head coach: (Iran) Amir Ghalenoei
Remaining Pro League quota: 3

In: Note: Flags indicate national team as defined under FIFA eligibility rules; some limited exceptions apply. Players may hold more than one non-FIFA nationality.

No.	Pos.	Nation	Player
20	MF	IRN	Esmaeil Sharifat^{PL} (from Foolad Khuzestan)
88	MF	IRN	Hamid Bou Hamdan^{PL} (from Foolad Khuzestan)
1	GK	IRN	Mohammad Bagher Sadeghi^{PL} (from Saba Qom)
5	DF	GEO	Giorgi Gvelesiani (from (Georgia (country)) Dinamo Tbilisi)
99	FW	BRA	Kiros Stanlley Soares Ferraz (from (Brazil) América-RN)
27	FW	IRN	Iman Mousavi^{PL} (from Oxin Alborz)
31	DF	IRN	Mohammad Amini^{PL} (from Mes Kerman)

Out: Note: Flags indicate national team as defined under FIFA eligibility rules; some limited exceptions apply. Players may hold more than one non-FIFA nationality.

No.	Pos.	Nation	Player
9	FW	HON	Jerry Bengtson (to (Costa Rica) Deportivo Saprissa)
19	DF	IRN	Mehrdad Ghanbari (to Gostaresh Foulad)
20	MF	IRN	Hojjat Haghverdi (to Paykan)
24	MF	IRN	Reza Shekari (to (Russia) FC Rostov)
70	FW	IRN	Yaser Feyzi (to Pars Jonoubi)
40	GK	IRN	Peyman Salmani (to Fajr Sepasi)
22	GK	IRN	Hamid Erfani (to Mes Kerman)

Notes

- ^{PL} Pro League quota.
- ^{No.PL} Pars Jonoubi Jam and Sepidrood are allowed to get 7 Pro League quota players.

== See also ==
- List of Iranian football transfers winter 2015–16
- List of Iranian football transfers summer 2016
- List of Iranian football transfers winter 2016–17
- List of Iranian football transfers summer 2017
- List of Iranian football transfers winter 2017–18
