= 2016–17 Persepolis F.C. season =

Persepolis
2016–17 season
- Chairman: Ali Akbar Taheri
- Manager: Branko Ivanković
- Stadium: Azadi Stadium
- Persian Gulf Pro League: Winners
- Hazfi Cup: Round of 32
- AFC Champions League: Quarter final
- Top goalscorer: League: Mehdi Taremi (18); All: Mehdi Taremi (24)
- Highest home attendance: 80,000 v Padideh and Tractor Sazi
- Lowest home attendance: 9,500 vs. Zob Ahan
- Average home league attendance: 48,567
Home colours	Away colours

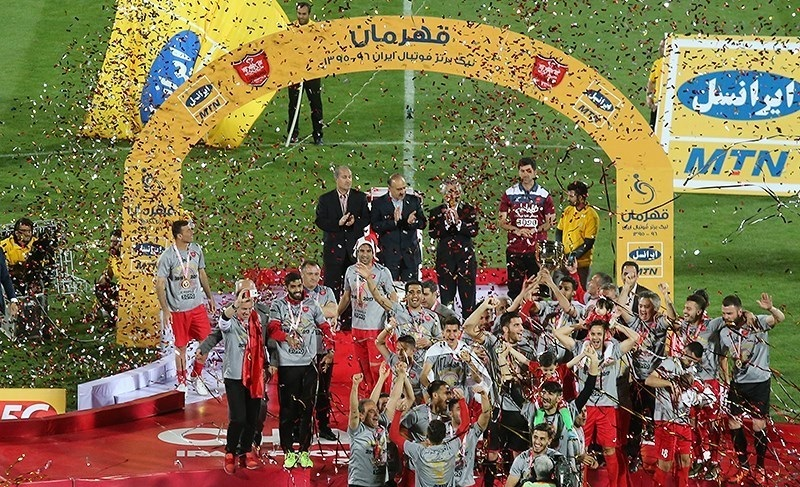
Persepolis players celebrating winning 2016–17 season

The 2016–17 season was Persepolis's 16th season in the Pro League, and their 34th consecutive season in the top division of Iranian Football. They were also competing in the Hazfi Cup and AFC Champions League.

== Squad ==
=== First team squad ===
No.	Name	Age	Nationality	Position (s)	Since	App	Goals	Assist	Ends	Signed from	Transfer fee	Notes
Goalkeepers
1	Alireza Beiranvand	24	(Iran)	GK	2016	0	0	0	2018	Naft Tehran	Free	
12	Abolfazl Darvishvand	21	(Iran)	GK	2016	0	0	0	2021	Rah Ahan	Free	U-21
44	Božidar Radošević	27	(Croatia)	GK	2016	0	0	0	2018	(Hungary) Debreceni	Free	
Defenders
4	Jalal Hosseini	34	(Iran)	CB / RB	2016	57	3	2	2017	Naft Tehran	Free	
5	Hamed Aghaei	19	(Iran)	CB / DM	2016	0	0	0	2019	Shahrdari Ardabil	Free	U-19
13	Hossein Mahini	30	(Iran)	RB / LB / CB	2012	63	1	5	2020	Malavan	Free	
15	Mohammad Ansari	25	(Iran)	LB / CB / DM	2015	24	1	1	2017	Shahrdar Tabriz	Free	
17	Sadegh Moharrami	20	(Iran)	RM / RW / RB	2016	0	0	0	2018	Malavan	Free	U-21
18	Mohsen Rabiekhah	23	(Iran)	DM / CB / LB	2016	0	0	0	2018	Sanat Naft	Free	
23	Mohammad Aram Tab	31	(Iran)	LB / CB	2016	0	0	0	2018	Saba Qom	Free	
27	Ramin Rezaeian	26	(Iran)	RB / RM / RW	2015	19	2	1	2017	Rah Ahan	Free	
Midfielders
7	Soroush Rafiei	26	(Iran)	AM / LW / RW	2017	0	0	0	2017	Foolad	Free	
10	Farshad Ahmadzadeh	24	(Iran)	AM / LW / RW / SS	2012	19	5	6	2018	Parseh	Free	Academy graduated
11	Kamal Kamyabinia	27	(Iran)	CM / AM / RM / LM	2015	24	2	0	2017	Naft Tehran	Free	
25	Ehsan Alvanzadeh	21	(Iran)	LW / AM / SS	2016	0	0	0	2019	Naft Masjed Soleyman	Free	U-23
37	Hamidreza Taherkhani	17	(Iran)	LW / RW / SS	2016	0	0	0	2019	Rah Ahan	Free	U-19; Academy graduated
66	Shahab Karami	25	(Iran)	CM / AM	2017	0	2	0	2019	Malavan F.C.	Free	
77	Mohsen Mosalman	25	(Iran)	AM / LW / RW / CM	2015	26	3	6	2018	Zob Ahan	Rls.2.7 billion	
Forwards
9	Mehdi Taremi	24	(Iran)	CF / AM / SS	2014	51	23	7	2018	Iranjavan	Free	
19	Vahid Amiri	28	(Iran)	CF / RW / LW / AM	2016	0	0	0	2018	Naft Tehran	Free	
28	Reza Karamolachaab	19	(Iran)	CF / SS	2016	0	0	0	2021	(Portugal) Mafra	Free	U-21
70	Ali Alipour	21	(Iran)	CF / RW / LW	2015	35	7	4	2020	Rah Ahan	Free	U-21
88	Saman Nariman Jahan	25	(Iran)	RW / LW/ CF	2017	0	0	0	2019	Machine Sazi	Free	
Players left the club during the season
17	Sasan Ansari	25	(Iran)	RW / LW / SS	2016	2	0	0	2016	Transferred to Foolad F.C.		
6	Antony Golec	26	(Australia)	CB / LB	2016	0	0	0	2016	Transferred to FC Bucheon		
8	Ahmad Nourollahi	23	(Iran)	DM / CM	2014	47	3	2	2017	On loan at Tractor (Conscription Period)		
2	Omid Alishah	24	(Iran)	LW / RW / LM / RM	2013	68	12	13	2017	On loan at Tractor (Conscription Period)		
29	Mohammad Rahmati	22	(Iran)	CM / DM	2015	0	0	0	2017	On loan at Machine Sazi		
14	Shahab Zahedi	21	(Iran)	LW / RW / CF	2014	5	0	0	2017	On loan at Machine Sazi		
55	Aref Mohammadalipour	16	(Iran)	CB / DM	2016	0	0	0	2017	Demote to Youth Team		
22	Oleksiy Polyanskiy	30	(Ukraine)	CB / CM	2016	4	0	0	2017	Released		
80	Volodymyr Pryyomov	30	(Ukraine)	CF / SS	2016	10	1	0	2017	Transferred to FC Oleksandriya		

Apps and goals updated as of 31 December 2015
For more on the reserve and academy squads, see Persepolis Novin, Persepolis Academy, Persepolis Shomal & Persepolis Qaem Shahr.
Source: fc-perspolis.com, FFIRI.IR

==== Loan list ====
Note: Flags indicate national team as defined under FIFA eligibility rules; some limited exceptions apply. Players may hold more than one non-FIFA nationality.

No.	Pos.	Nation	Player
2	MF	IRI	Omid Alishah (at Tractor till 5 January 2019)
8	MF	IRI	Ahmad Nourollahi (at Tractor till 5 January 2019)
14	FW	IRI	Shahab Zahedi (at Mashin Sazi till 16 May 2017)
29	MF	IRI	Mohammad Rahmati (at Mashin Sazi till 16 May 2017)

For recent transfers, see List of Iranian football transfers summer 2016 & List of Iranian football transfers winter 2016–17.
For more on the reserve and academy squads, see Persepolis Novin, Persepolis Academy, Persepolis Shomal & Persepolis Qaem Shahr.

== New Contracts ==
No	P	Name	Age	Contract length	Contract ends	Date	Source
70	FW	Ali Alipour	20	4 season	2020	16 May 2016	
14	FW	Shahab Zahedi	20	5 season	2021	26 May 2016	
2	MF	Omid Alishah	24	1 season	2017	14 June 2016	
9	FW	Mehdi Taremi	24	2 season	2018	16 July 2016	
13	DF	Hossein Mahini	29	3 season	2020	18 July 2016	
8	MF	Ahmad Nourollahi	23	2 season	2019	23 July 2016	
27	DF	Ramin Rezaeian	26	2 season	2019	5 September 2016	

== Transfers ==
=== In ===
No	P	Name	Age	Moving from	Ends	Transfer fee	Type	Transfer window	Quota	Source
13	RB	Hossein Mahini	29	Malavan	2017	—	Loan return	Summer		
	CB	Hossein Kanaanizadegan	22	Malavan	2017	—	Loan return	Summer		
	FW	Ali Fatemi	23	Rahahan	2017	—	Loan return	Summer		
1	GK	Alireza Beiranvand	23	Naft Tehran	2018	—	Transfer	Summer	PL	
17	MF	Sasan Ansari	25	Foolad	2018	—	Transfer	Summer	PL	
25	FW	Ehsan Alvanzadeh	21	Naft Masjed Soleyman	2019	—	Transfer	Summer		
4	CB	Jalal Hosseini	34	Naft Tehran	2017	—	Transfer	Summer	PL	
19	FW	Vahid Amiri	28	Naft Tehran	2018	—	Transfer	Summer	PL	
12	GK	Abolfazl Darvishvand	20	Rah Ahan	2021	—	Transfer	Summer		
18	MF	Mohsen Rabiekhah	28	Sanat Naft	2018	—	Transfer	Summer		
6	CB	(Australia) Antony Golec	26	(Moldova) Sheriff Tiraspol	2018	—	Transfer	Summer		
5	CB	Hamed Aghaei	18	Shahrdari Ardabil	2019	—	Transfer	Summer		
23	LB	Mohammad Aram Tab	31	Saba Qom	2018	—	Transfer	Summer	PL	
17	MF	Sadegh Moharrami	20	Malavan	2018	—	Transfer	Summer		
80	FW	(Ukraine) Volodymyr Pryyomov	30	(Ukraine) Metalist Kharkiv	2018	—	Transfer	Summer		
22	DF	(Ukraine) Oleksiy Polyanskyi	30	(Ukraine) Shakhtar Donetsk	2018	—	Transfer	Summer		
44	GK	(Croatia) Božidar Radošević	27	(Hungary) Debreceni	2018	—	Transfer	Summer		
37	FW	Hamidreza Taherkhani	17	Rahahan	2019	—	Transfer	Summer		
28	FW	Reza Karamolachaab	19	(Portugal) Mafra	2021	—	Transfer	Summer		
55	CB	Aref Mohammadalipour	15	Free agent	2021	—	Transfer	Winter(during first half season)		
88	LW	Saman Nariman Jahan	25	Machine Sazi	2019	—	Transfer	Winter	PL	
7	AM	Soroush Rafiei	26	Foolad	2017	—	Transfer	Winter	PL	
66	CM	Shahab Karami	25	Malavan	2019	—	Transfer	Winter(during second half season)		

=== Out ===
No	P	Name	Age	Moving to	Transfer fee	Type	Transfer window	Source
4	CB	(Costa Rica) Michael Umaña	33	(Costa Rica) Municipal Liberia	Free		Summer	
30	GK	Ali Mohsenzadeh	23	Rahahan	Free		Summer	
40	RB	Babak Hatami	29	Gostaresh Foolad	Free		Summer	
18	CM	Mehrdad Kafshgari	29	Padideh	Free		Summer	
12	GK	Morteza Ghadimipour	21	Mashhad	Free		Summer	
14	FW	(Honduras) Jerry Bengtson	29	Zobahan	Free		Summer	
6	CB	Mohsen Bengar	36	Tractor	Free		Summer	
20	CB	Alireza Nourmohammadi	34	Mashhad	Free		Summer	
78	FW	Ali Fatemi	23	Saba Qom	Free		Summer	
	CB	Hossein Kanaanizadegan	22	Esteghlal	Transfer	Rls.4 billion	Summer	
19	MF	Milad Kamandani	21	Padideh	Free		Summer	
44	CB	Amir Abbas Ayenechi	22	Free agent	Free		Summer	
3	LB	Vahid Heydarieh	23	Free agent	Free		Summer	
16	FW	Reza Khaleghifar	32	Gostaresh Foolad	Free		Summer	
1	GK	Sosha Makani	29	(Norway) Mjøndalen IF	Free		Summer	
23	CB	(Croatia) Luka Marić	29	(Romania) FC Dinamo București	Free		Summer	
55	GK	(Uzbekistan) Alexander Lobanov	30	(Uzbekistan) Pakhtakor	Free		Summer	
17	FW	Sasan Ansari	25	Foolad	Transfer	Rls.2 billion	Summer	
6	CB	(Australia) Antony Golec	26	(South Korea) FC Bucheon	Free		Winter(during first half season)	
8	CM	Ahmad Nourollahi	23	Tractor	undisclosed	Loan(Conscription Period)	Winter	
2	FW	Omid Alishah	24	Tractor	undisclosed	Loan(Conscription Period)	Winter	
14	FW	Shahab Zahedi	21	Machine Sazi	undisclosed	Loan	Winter	
29	MF	Mohammad Rahmati	22	Machine Sazi	undisclosed	Loan	Winter	
55	CB	Aref Mohammadalipour	15	Demote To Youth Team			Winter(during second half season)	
22	CB	(Ukraine) Oleksiy Polyanskiy	30	Released			Winter(during second half season)	
80	FW	(Ukraine) Volodymyr Pryyomov	30	(Ukraine) FC Oleksandriya	Free	Transfer	Winter(during second half season)	

=== Technical staff ===
Position	Staff
Head coach	(Croatia) Branko Ivanković
Assistant coach	(Croatia) Sreten Ćuk
First-team coach	(Iran) Karim Bagheri
Goalkeeping coach	(Croatia) Igor Panadić
Physical fitness trainer	(Croatia) Marko Stilinovic
Analyzer	(Iran) Farzad Habibollahi
Doctor	(Iran) Dr. Alireza Haghighat
Physiotherapist	(Iran) Meysam Alipour
Team Manager	(Iran) Mahmoud Khordbin
Media Officer	(Iran) Pendar Khomarlou

== Competitions ==
=== Overview ===
Competition	First match	Last match	Starting round	Final position	Record							
Competition	First match	Last match	Starting round	Final position	Pld	W	D	L	GF	GA	GD	Win %
PGPL	27 July 2016	4 May 2017	Matchday 1	Winners	30	20	6	4	46	14	+32	66.67
Hazfi Cup	30 September 2016	30 September 2016	Round of 64	Round of 64	1	0	1	0	1	1	+0	0.00
Champions League	21 February 2017	30 May 2017	Group stage	Quarter-finals	8	3	4	1	10	8	+2	37.50
Total					39	23	11	5	57	23	+34	58.97

Last updated: 30 May 2017
Source: Competitions

=== Persian Gulf Pro League ===
==== Standings ====
Pos	Team	Pld	W	D	L	GF	GA	GD	Pts	Qualification or relegation
1	Persepolis (C)	30	20	6	4	46	14	+32	66	Qualification for the 2018 AFC Champions League group stage
2	Esteghlal	30	16	9	5	45	27	+18	57	Qualification for the 2018 AFC Champions League group stage
3	Tractor Sazi	30	15	11	4	38	24	+14	56	Qualification for the 2018 AFC Champions League group stage
4	Zob Ahan	30	12	10	8	39	30	+9	46	Qualification for the 2018 AFC Champions League qualifying play-offs
5	Sepahan	30	12	9	9	38	34	+4	45	

Updated to match(es) played on 4 May 2017. Source: IPL Stats, Soccerway
Rules for classification: 1) Points; 2) Goal difference; 3) Goals scored.
(C) Champions

==== Results summary ====
Overall								Home						Away					
Pld	W	D	L	GF	GA	GD	Pts	W	D	L	GF	GA	GD	W	D	L	GF	GA	GD
30	20	6	4	46	14	+32	66	12	3	0	27	5	+22	8	3	4	19	9	+10

Last updated: 4 May 2017.
Source: Ipl Stats

==== Results by round ====
Round	1	2	3	4	5	6	7	8	9	10	11	12	13	14	15	16	17	18	19	20	21	22	23	24	25	26	27	28	29	30
Ground	A	H	A	H	A	H	A	H	A	H	A	H	A	A	H	H	A	H	A	H	A	H	A	H	A	H	A	H	H	A
Result	W	D	W	W	D	D	W	W	D	W	D	W	W	L	W	W	W	W	W	W	L	W	W	W	L	W	W	W	D	L
Position	3	4	1	1	1	2	2	1	1	1	2	1	1	1	1	1	1	1	1	1	1	1	1	1	1	1	1	1	1	1

Updated to match(es) played on 4 May 2017. Source: "Ipl".
A = Away; H = Home; W = Win; D = Draw; L = Loss

==== Matches ====
Win Draw Loss Postponed

Date Round	Home	Score	Away	Location

26 July 2016 1	Saipa	0–1	Persepolis	Tehran
20:45 DST+03:30	S.Lotfi (yellow card) 80'	Live TV: IRIB TV3 / Jame Jam 1	F.Ahmadzadeh (yellow card) 43'; K. Kamyabinia 68'; V.Amiri (yellow card) 72'	Stadium: Takhti Stadium; Attendance: 16,500; Referee: Shahin Haj Babaei

1 August 2016 2	Persepolis	1–1	Foolad	Tehran
20:45 DST+03:30	K.Kamyabinia (yellow card) 52'; M.Taremi (yellow card) 73'; V.Amiri 74'	Live TV: IRIB TV3 / Jame Jam 1	A.Nasseri 67'; M.Tahmasbi (yellow card) 70'; M.Pakparvar (yellow card) 93'	Stadium: Azadi Stadium; Attendance: 50,000; Referee: Mehdi Seyed Ali

6 August 2016 3	Gostaresh Foulad	0–1	Persepolis	Tabriz
18:00 DST+03:30	Luciano Pereira (yellow card) 18'; M.Asadi (yellow card) 92'	Live TV: IRIB TV3 / Jame Jam 1	F.Ahmadzadeh (yellow card) 42'; V.Amiri 47'; M.Rabiekhah (yellow card) 50'; M.Mosalman (yellow card) 82'	Stadium: Bonyan Diesel Stadium; Attendance: 4,050; Referee: Touraj Haghverdi

11 August 2016 4	Persepolis	1–0	Saba Qom	Tehran
20:30 DST+03:30	M.Taremi 40'; M.Ansari (yellow card) 60'	Live TV: IRIB TV3 / Jame Jam 1	P.Seifpanahi (yellow card) 36'	Stadium: Azadi Stadium; Attendance: 50,000; Referee: Mohsen Torky

10 September 2016 5	Tractor Sazi	0–0	Persepolis	Tabriz
17:15 DST+03:30	M.Nouri (yellow card) 26'; H.Mohammadi (yellow card) 34'; S.Ashouri (yellow card) 81'		K.Kamyabinia (yellow card) 84'	Stadium: Yadegar-e-Emam Stadium; Attendance: 7,000; Referee: Ashkan Khorshidi

16 September 2016 6	Persepolis	0–0	Esteghlal	Tehran
17:00 DST+03:30	A.Alipour (yellow card) 22'		O.Ebrahimi (yellow card) 13'; F.Bagheri (yellow card) 69'; Kh.Heydari (yellow card) 89'	Stadium: Azadi Stadium; Attendance: 75,000; Referee: Alireza Faghani

21 September 2016 7	Sepahan	1–3	Persepolis	Fooladshahr
17:30 DST+03:30	E.Hajsafi 22'; P.Henrique (yellow card) 37'; M.Coulibaly (yellow card) 57'; R.Navidkia (yellow card) 76'; M.Navidkia (yellow card) 87'		O.Alishah 15'; M.Taremi 60', 74'	Stadium: Foolad Shahr Stadium; Attendance: 12,000; Referee: Bijan Heydari

15 October 2016 8	Persepolis	3–0	Naft Tehran	Tehran
18:00 DST+03:30	H.Mahini 14'; M.Taremi 28'; K. Kamyabinia 83'			Stadium: Azadi Stadium; Attendance: 16000

20 October 2016 9	Esteghlal Khuzestan	1–1	Persepolis	Ahvaz
16:45 DST+03:30	R.Zohaivi 35'		F.Ahmadzadeh 83'	Stadium: Ghadir Stadium; Attendance: 30000

28 October 2016 10	Persepolis	1–0	Sanat Naft Abadan	Tehran
16:40 DST+03:30	M.Taremi 85'			Stadium: Azadi Stadium; Attendance: 65000

24 November 2016 11	Paykan	0–0	Persepolis	Shahr-e Qods
15:15 (DST+03:30)				Stadium: Shahr-e Qods Stadium; Attendance: 8000

2 December 2016 12	Persepolis	1–0	Machine Sazi	Tehran
17:15 DST+03:30	V.Amiri 20'			Stadium: Azadi Stadium; Attendance: 25000

8 December 2016 13	Padideh	1–2	Persepolis	Mashhad
14:30 DST+03:30	M.Yousefi 24'		M.Taremi 20'; V.Amiri 90+2'	Stadium: Samen Stadium; Attendance: 25000

16 December 2016 14	Zob Ahan	1–0	Persepolis	Fooladshahr
17:20 DST+03:30	Pahlevan 65'			Stadium: Foolad Shahr Stadium; Attendance: 12500

23 December 2016 15	Persepolis	3–0	FC Mashhad	Tehran
15:15 DST+03:30	Kamyabinia 8'; R.Rezaeian 12'; M.Taremi 52'			Stadium: Azadi Stadium; Attendance: 45000

13 January 2017 16	Persepolis	1–0	Saipa	Tehran
16:35 DST+03:30	M.Taremi 48'			Stadium: Azadi Stadium; Attendance: 50000

18 January 2017 17	Foolad	0–3	Persepolis	Ahvaz
15:00 DST+03:30			A.Karami 2' (o.g.); Amiri 12'; Alipour 48'	Stadium: Ghadir Stadium; Attendance: 30000

23 January 2017 18	Persepolis	1–0	Gostaresh Foulad	Tehran
16:45 DST+03:30	J.Hosseini (yellow card) 64'; M.Taremi 76'; F.Ahmadzadeh (yellow card) 84'; M.Taremi (yellow card) 89'	Live TV: IRIB TV3 / Jame Jam 1	Ebrahimzadeh (yellow card) 36'; Khaleghifar (yellow card) 59'; Ebrahimzadeh (yellow card) 81'	Stadium: Azadi Stadium; Attendance: 30000; Referee: Salehi

28 January 2017 19	Saba Qom	0–2	Persepolis	Qom
16:50 DST+03:30			Omranzadeh 73' (o.g.); R.Rezaeian 83'	Stadium: Yadegar Emam Stadium; Attendance: 12000

5 February 2017 20	Persepolis	3–0	Tractor Sazi	Tehran
15:00 DST+03:30	Taremi 2'; Rezaeain 23'; Amiri 64'			Stadium: Azadi Stadium; Attendance: 80000

12 February 2017 21	Esteghlal	3–2	Persepolis	Tehran
15:00 DST+03:30	Esmaeili 18'; Ghorbani 20'; Rezaei 44'		Rafiei 5'; Hosseini 90+3'	Stadium: Azadi Stadium; Attendance: 77000

16 February 2017 22	Persepolis	2–1	Sepahan	Tehran
17:10 DST+03:30	Taremi 56'; Rezaeian 87'		Reykani 56'	Stadium: Azadi Stadium; Attendance: 67000

5 March 2017 23	Naft Tehran	0–2	Persepolis	Tehran
17:25 DST+03:30			Rafiei 57'; Taremi 87'	Stadium: Takhti Stadium; Attendance: 17000

9 March 2017 24	Persepolis	1–0	Esteghlal Khuzestan	Tehran
17:30 DST+03:30	Taremi 16'			Stadium: Azadi Stadium; Attendance: 50000

1 April 2017 25	Sanat Naft Abadan	1–0	Persepolis	Abadan
17:30 DST+03:30	Abdollahzadeh 40'			Stadium: Takhti Stadium; Attendance: 12000

5 April 2017 26	Persepolis	2–0	Paykan	Tehran
18:50 DST+03:30	Alipour 55'; Taremi 90'			Stadium: Azadi Stadium; Attendance: 50000

15 April 2017 27	Machine Sazi	0–2	Persepolis	Tabriz
17:00 DST+03:30			Alipour 1'; Taremi 69'	Stadium: Yadegar-e-Emam Stadium; Attendance: 5000

19 April 2017 28	Persepolis	4–0	Padideh	Tehran
17:45 DST+03:30	Kamyabinia 50'; Alipour 68'; Taremi 70'; Ahmadzadeh 89'			Stadium: Azadi Stadium; Attendance: 80000

29 April 2017 29	Persepolis	3–3	Zob Ahan	Tehran
19:00 DST+03:30	Rafiei 39'; Taremi 53', 85'		Hosseini 7'; Bengtson 13', 52'	Stadium: Azadi Stadium; Attendance: 9000

4 May 2017 30	FC Mashhad	1–0	Persepolis	Mashhad
19:00 DST+03:30	Seifollahi 49'			Stadium: Samen Stadium; Attendance: 30000

==== Score overview ====
Win Draw Loss

Opposition	Home score	Away score	Aggregate score
Esteghlal	0–0	3–2	3–2
Esteghlal Khuzestan	1–0	1–1	2–1
Foolad	1–1	0–3	4–1
Gostaresh Foulad	1–0	0–1	2–0
Machine Sazi	1–0	0–2	3–0
Sanat Naft	1–0	1–0	1–1
Naft Tehran	3–0	0–2	5–0
Padideh	4–0	1–2	6–1
Paykan	2–0	0–0	2–0
Saba	1–0	0–2	3–0
Saipa	1–0	0–1	2–0
Sepahan	2–1	1–3	5–2
FC Mashhad	3–0	1–0	3–1
Tractor	3–0	0–0	3–0
Zob Ahan	3–3	1–0	3–4

=== Hazfi Cup ===
==== Matches ====
Win Draw Loss Postponed

Date Round	Home	Score	Away	Location

30 September 2016 Round of 64	Qashqai Shiraz	1–1 (a.e.t.) (6 – 5 p)	Persepolis	Shiraz
15:00: DST+03:30	M.J. Zarei 9'		V. Pryyomov 59'	Stadium: Hafezieh Stadium; Attendance: 15.000; Referee: Mohammad Hossein Zahedifar
	Penalties
	(penalty scored) M.J. Zarei; (penalty missed) A. Asadi; (penalty scored) M. Chabok; (penalty scored) M. Razavi Pourian; (penalty scored) M. Shiri; (penalty scored) H. Moradi; (penalty scored) M. Sharifzadeh		(penalty scored) H. Mahini; (penalty scored) A. Nourollahi; (penalty scored) V. Pryyomov; (penalty scored) M. Mosalman; (penalty missed) K. Kamyabinia; (penalty scored) F. Ahmadzadeh; (penalty missed) S. Zahedi

=== AFC Champions League ===
==== Group stage ====
Pos	Team	Pld	W	D	L	GF	GA	GD	Pts	Qualification	HIL	PER	RAY	WAH
1	(Saudi Arabia) Al-Hilal	6	3	3	0	10	7	+3	12	Advance to knockout stage	—	0–0	2–1	1–0
2	(Iran) Persepolis	6	2	3	1	9	8	+1	9	Advance to knockout stage	1–1	—	0–0	4–2
3	(Qatar) Al-Rayyan	6	2	1	3	10	13	−3	7		3–4	3–1	—	2–1
4	(United Arab Emirates) Al-Wahda	6	1	1	4	12	13	−1	4		2–2	2–3	5–1	—

Source: AFC
Rules for classification: Group stage tiebreakers

==== Matches ====
Win Draw Loss Postponed

Date Round	Home	Score	Away	Location

21 February 2017 1	Persepolis (Iran)	1–1	(Saudi Arabia) Al Hilal	Muscat, Oman
18:30 (IRST)	Mohsen Mosalman 68'; Kamal Kamyabinia (yellow card) 24'	Report	Carlos Eduardo 82'	Stadium: Sultan Qaboos; Attendance: 13,715; Referee: (Sri Lanka) Hettikamkanamge Perera; Man of the Match: Mohsen Mosalman
Note: Matches between teams from Iran and Saudi Arabia are played on neutral venues due to deterioration of Iran–Saudi Arabia relations.

28 February 2017 2	Al Wahda (United Arab Emirates)	2–3	(Iran) Persepolis	Abu Dhabi, United Arab Emirates
18:40 (IRST)	Ismail Matar 58'; Jorge Valdivia 64'; Sultan Al Ghaferi (yellow card) 38'; Mohammed Abdulbasit (yellow card) 89'	Report	Vahid Amiri 4'; Mehdi Taremi 80', 90'; Mohsen Mosalman (yellow card) 48'; Soroush Rafiei (yellow card) 48'; Alireza Beiranvand (yellow card) 87'	Stadium: Al Nahyan; Attendance: 7,655; Referee: (Singapore) Muhammad Taqi; Man of the Match: Mehdi Taremi

14 March 2017 3	Al Rayyan (Qatar)	3–1	(Iran) Persepolis	Doha, Qatar
18:55 (IRST)	Rodrigo Tabata 19', 58' (pen.); Sergio García 88'; Abdulkarim Al-Ali (yellow card) 66'; Koh Myong-jin (yellow card) 86'	Report	Mehdi Taremi 6'; Vahid Amiri (yellow card) 39'; Jalal Hosseini (yellow card) 67'	Stadium: Jassim Bin Hamad Stadium; Attendance: 4,170; Referee: (China) Fu Ming; Man of the Match: Rodrigo Tabata

10 April 2017 4	Persepolis (Iran)	0–0	(Qatar) Al Rayyan	Tehran, Iran
19:00 (DST+04:30)	Ali Alipour (yellow card) 4'; Soroush Rafiei (yellow card) 76'; Jalal Hosseini (yellow card) 90+2'	Report	Omar Bari (yellow card) 43'; Sebastián Soria (yellow card) 90+4'	Stadium: Azadi Stadium; Attendance: 57,130; Referee: (Japan) Ryuji Sato; Man of the Match: Omar Bari

24 April 2017 5	Al Hilal (Saudi Arabia)	0–0	(Iran) Persepolis	Muscat, Oman
19:30 (DST+04:30)	Mohammed Jahfali (yellow card) 5'; Mohammed Al-Breik (yellow card) 27'; Abdulmalek Al-Khaibri (yellow card) 51'	Report		Stadium: Sultan Qaboos; Attendance: 10.177; Referee: (Iraq) Mohanad Qasim Eesee Sarray; Man of the Match: Mehdi Taremi
Note: Matches between teams from Iran and Saudi Arabia are played on neutral venues due to deterioration of Iran–Saudi Arabia relations.

8 May 2017 6	Persepolis (Iran)	4–2	(United Arab Emirates) Al Wahda	Tehran, Iran
19:55 (DST+04:30)	Soroush Rafiei 17'; Mehdi Taremi 20', 54', 70'	Report	Ahmed Al-Akbari 34'; Sebastián Tagliabué 11'; Jorge Valdivia (yellow card) 19'; Salem Sultan (yellow card) 54'; Balázs Dzsudzsák (yellow card) 80'	Stadium: Azadi Stadium; Attendance: 43.160; Referee: (China) Fu Ming; Man of the Match: Mehdi Taremi

23 May 2017 Round of 16	Persepolis (Iran)	0–0	(Qatar) Lekhwiya	Tehran, Iran
19:30 (DST+04:30)	Jalal Hosseini (yellow card) 90+3'	Report	Ismaeel Mohammad (yellow card) 58'; Mohammed Musa (yellow card) 62'	Stadium: Azadi Stadium; Attendance: 40; Referee: (Uzbekistan) Valentin Kovalenko; Man of the Match: Nam Tae-hee
Note: The Persepolis v Lekhwiya match played behind closed doors due to spectator misconduct during Persepolis's home match against Al-Wahda on 8 May 2017

30 May 2017 Round of 16	Lekhwiya (Qatar)	0–1	(Iran) Persepolis	Doha, Qatar
23:30 (DST+04:30)	Ali Afif (yellow card) 79'	Report	Chico Flores 23' (o.g.); Soroush Rafiei (yellow card) 8'; Mohammad Ansari (yellow card) 26'; Jalal Hosseini (yellow card) 90+1'	Stadium: Jassim Bin Hamad Stadium; Attendance: 1.700; Referee: (China) Ma Ning; Man of the Match: Mehdi Taremi

=== Friendly Matches ===
==== Pre-season ====
Win Draw Loss Postponed

Date Round	Home	Score	Away	Location

28 June 2016	Persepolis	6–1	Parag	Tehran
17:30	J. Hosseini; H. Mahini (pen.); A. Alipour (pen.); F. Ahmadzadeh; O. Alishah; SH. Zahedi			Stadium: Kazemi Stadium

5 July 2016	Persepolis	4–1	(Ukraine) Lokomotyv	Kyiv
18:00	A. Alipour 55' 57'; A. Nourollahi 59'; SH. Zahedi 61'			Stadium: Dynamo Training Center

8 July 2016	Obolon Brovar (Ukraine)	2–5	Persepolis	Kyiv
19:00	P. Hordiychuk 45'; V. Prodan 84'		V. Amiri 15' 53'; F. Ahmadzadeh 24'; O. Alishah 29' (pen.); SH. Zahedi 79'	Stadium: Obolon Arena

9 July 2016	Persepolis	1–2	(Ukraine) Desna Chernihiv	Kyiv
17:30	V. Amiri 43'		O. Filippov 24'; M. Banasevych 87'	Stadium: Dynamo Training Center

11 July 2016	Persepolis	3–3	(Ukraine) Arsenal Kyiv	Kyiv
17:30	A. Nourollahi 2'; A. Alipour 5'; O. Alishah 10' (pen.)		V. Semchuk; A. Eseola	Stadium: Dynamo Training Center

19 July 2016	Persepolis	1–1	Khooneh Be Khooneh	Tehran
18:00	V. Amiri 30'		H. Kazemi 31'	Stadium: Kazemi Stadium; Attendance: 12000

==== During season ====
Win Draw Loss

Date Round	Home	Score	Away	Location

27 July 2016	Persepolis	3–3	Pars Jonoubi Jam	Tehran
	M. Taremi 17' 85' (pen.)		35'; 50'	Stadium: Kazemi Stadium

20 August 2016	Persepolis	2–0	Shahrdari Hamedan	Tehran
	H. Mahini; V. Pryyomov			Stadium: Kazemi Stadium

23 August 2016	Persepolis	1–1	Haf Semnan	Tehran
	V. Pryyomov 3'		s. Heydari 90'	Stadium: Kazemi Stadium

28 August 2016	Persepolis	7–0	Persepolis Qaem Shahr	Tehran
	S. Ansari 10'; A. Alipour 51' 62' (pen.) 86'; H. Taherkhani 60' 90'; A. Nourollahi 83'			Stadium: Kazemi Stadium

31 August 2016	Persepolis	2–2	Saipa	Tehran
				Stadium: Kazemi Stadium

5 October 2016	Persepolis	9–0	Khalkhal Dasht	Tehran
	A. Alipour 10'; V. Pryyomov; E. Alvanzadeh; S. Zahedi; M. Rahmati; H. Aghaei			Stadium: Kazemi Stadium; Attendance: 50

6 October 2016	Persepolis	6–2	Persepolis U-23	Tehran
	F. Ahmadzadeh 12'; S. Zahedi 26'; V. Pryyomov; A. Nourollahi			Stadium: Kazemi Stadium; Attendance: 100

== Club ==
=== Kit ===
Supplier: (Spain) Joma

Home Kit	Away Kit	2017 ACL Kit	ACL Away Kit

Source: "Persepolis FC' current kit".

=== Sponsorship ===
- Main sponsor: Hamrah-e Avval
- Official sponsor: Kosar Credit Cooperative
- Official sponsor: Steel Azin Iranian Holding Co.
- Official shirt manufacturer:Joma
- Official water: Damavand Mineral Water Co.

== See also ==
- 2016–17 Iran Pro League
- 2016–17 Hazfi Cup
