= Football at the 2005 Islamic Solidarity Games =

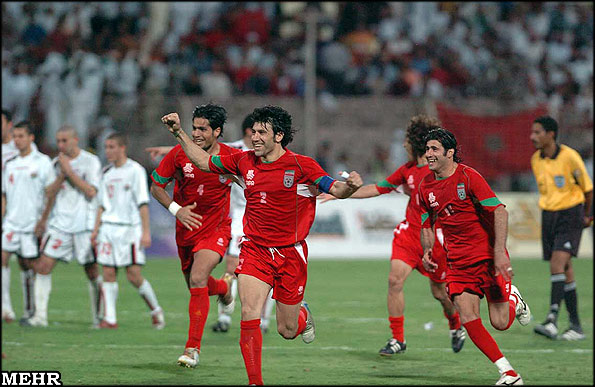
- Iran B vs Syria U20 third place match

Tournament details
- Host country: Saudi Arabia
- Dates: 9 – 20 April
- Teams: 14 (from 2 confederations)
- Venues: 4 (in 4 host cities)

Final positions
- Champions: Saudi Arabia (1st title)
- Runners-up: Morocco B
- Third place: Iran B
- Fourth place: Syria U20

Tournament statistics
- Matches played: 26
- Goals scored: 73 (2.81 per match)

Football at the 2005 Islamic Solidarity Games was a football competition held in Saudi Arabia from April 9 to April 20, 2005. Saudi Arabia became champions, defeating Morocco B 1–0 in the final.

== Participating teams ==
While a number of participating countries fielded their full A national teams, several others sent alternate selections, mainly Olympic (under-23) teams.

- Algeria U21
- Cameroon U23 (withdrew)
- Chad
- Iran B
- Malaysia
- Mali U23
- Morocco B
- Oman
- Pakistan
- Palestine
- Saudi Arabia (hosts)
- Kuwait (withdrew)
- Sudan U23
- Syria U20
- Tajikistan
- Yemen U23

== Final tournament ==
=== Group stage ===
==== Group A ====
| Pos | Team | Pld | W | D | L | GF | GA | GD | Pts | Qualification |
|---|---|---|---|---|---|---|---|---|---|---|
| 1 | Iran B | 3 | 2 | 1 | 0 | 13 | 0 | +13 | 7 | Knockout stage |
| 2 | Oman | 3 | 2 | 1 | 0 | 7 | 1 | +6 | 7 | Knockout stage |
| 3 | Sudan U23 | 3 | 1 | 0 | 2 | 5 | 8 | −3 | 3 | |
| 4 | Tajikistan | 3 | 0 | 0 | 3 | 0 | 16 | −16 | 0 | |

10 April 2005
17:50

| Oman | 4–1 | Sudan U23 |
|---|---|---|
| Bashir 23'; Al-Hosni 61', 63', 90+1' | Report | Moga 12' |

Prince Abdullah al-Faisal Stadium, Jeddah
10 April 2005
20:35

| Iran B | 9–0 | Tajikistan |
|---|---|---|
| Oladi 9', 29', 55', 78'; Fazli 12', 48', 59'; Jabbari 53'; Taghipour 81' | Report |

Prince Abdullah al-Faisal Stadium, Jeddah

12 April 2005
17:50

| Iran B | 4–0 | Sudan U23 |
|---|---|---|
| Farzaneh 4'; Jabbari 8'; Oladi 13'; Navazi 46' | Report |

Prince Abdullah al-Faisal Stadium, Jeddah
12 April 2005
20:35

| Tajikistan | 0–3 | Oman |
|---|---|---|
| | Report | Bashir 40'; Kano 62'; Saleh 87' |

Prince Abdullah al-Faisal Stadium, Jeddah

14 April 2005
17:50

| Sudan U23 | 4–0 | Tajikistan |
|---|---|---|
| Moga 14', 61', 84'; Ahmed 60' | Report |

Prince Abdullah al-Faisal Stadium, Jeddah
14 April 2005
20:35

| Iran B | 0–0 | Oman |
|---|---|---|
| | Report |

Prince Abdullah al-Faisal Stadium, Jeddah

==== Group B ====
| Pos | Team | Pld | W | D | L | GF | GA | GD | Pts | Qualification |
|---|---|---|---|---|---|---|---|---|---|---|
| 1 | Mali U23 | 2 | 1 | 1 | 0 | 4 | 1 | +3 | 4 | Knockout stage |
| 2 | Syria U20 | 2 | 1 | 1 | 0 | 2 | 0 | +2 | 4 | Knockout stage |
| 3 | Chad | 2 | 0 | 0 | 2 | 1 | 6 | −5 | 0 | |
| 4 | Cameroon U23 (W) | 0 | - | - | - | - | - | — | 0 | |

(W) Withdrew
9 April 2005
17:50

| Mali U23 | 0–0 | Syria U20 |
|---|---|---|
| | Report |

Prince Mohammed bin Abdul Aziz Stadium, Medina

11 April 2005
20:35

| Chad | 1–4 | Mali U23 |
|---|---|---|
| Medego 26' | Report | Berthé 2'; Abouta 29', 37'; Diallo 77' |

Prince Mohammed bin Abdul Aziz Stadium, Medina

13 April 2005
17:50

| Syria U20 | 2–0 | Chad |
|---|---|---|
| Al Haj 25'; Atasy 90+4' | Report |

Prince Mohammed bin Abdul Aziz Stadium, Medina

==== Group C ====
| Pos | Team | Pld | W | D | L | GF | GA | GD | Pts | Qualification |
|---|---|---|---|---|---|---|---|---|---|---|
| 1 | Saudi Arabia | 3 | 3 | 0 | 0 | 12 | 0 | +12 | 9 | Knockout stage |
| 2 | Algeria U21 | 3 | 2 | 0 | 1 | 4 | 5 | −1 | 6 | Knockout stage |
| 3 | Yemen U23 | 3 | 1 | 0 | 2 | 3 | 6 | −3 | 3 | |
| 4 | Palestine | 3 | 0 | 0 | 3 | 1 | 9 | −8 | 0 | |

9 April 2005
17:50

| Algeria U21 | 3–0 | Palestine |
|---|---|---|
| Hanitser 11', 20'; Metref 90' (pen.) | Report |

Prince Abdullah al-Faisal Stadium, Jeddah
9 April 2005
20:35

| Saudi Arabia | 4–0 | Yemen U23 |
|---|---|---|
| Al-Wadani 12'; Al-Harthi 28'; Hakami 71'; Ameen 88' | Report |

Prince Abdullah al-Faisal Stadium, Jeddah

11 April 2005
17:50

| Saudi Arabia | 3–0 | Palestine |
|---|---|---|
| Al-Harthi 71'; Ameen 81'; Bashir 84' | Report |

Prince Abdullah al-Faisal Stadium, Jeddah
11 April 2005
20:35

| Yemen U23 | 0–1 | Algeria U21 |
|---|---|---|
| | Report | Feham 82' |

Prince Abdullah al-Faisal Stadium, Jeddah

13 April 2005
17:50

| Palestine | 1–3 | Yemen U23 |
|---|---|---|
| (?) | Report | (?) |

Prince Abdullah al-Faisal Stadium, Jeddah
13 April 2005
20:35

| Saudi Arabia | 5–0 | Algeria U21 |
|---|---|---|
| Y. Al-Qahtani (?); Al-Waked (?); Al-Wadani (?); Al-Zahrani (?) | Report |

Prince Abdullah al-Faisal Stadium, Jeddah

==== Group D ====
Malaysia awarded first place by drawing of lots.

| Pos | Team | Pld | W | D | L | GF | GA | GD | Pts | Qualification |
|---|---|---|---|---|---|---|---|---|---|---|
| 1 | Malaysia | 2 | 1 | 1 | 0 | 2 | 0 | +2 | 4 | Knockout stage |
| 2 | Morocco B | 2 | 1 | 1 | 0 | 2 | 0 | +2 | 4 | Knockout stage |
| 3 | Pakistan | 2 | 0 | 0 | 2 | 0 | 4 | −4 | 0 | |
| 4 | Kuwait (W) | 0 | - | - | - | - | - | — | 0 | |

(W) Withdrew
9 April 2005
20:35

| Morocco B | 2–0 | Pakistan |
|---|---|---|
| Miri 48'; Erraki 67' | Report |

King Fahd Stadium, Ta’if

11 April 2005
17:50

| Morocco B | 0–0 | Malaysia |
|---|---|---|
| | Report |

King Fahd Stadium, Ta’if

13 April 2005
17:50

| Malaysia | 2–0 | Pakistan |
|---|---|---|
| Saari 71', 73' | Report |

King Fahd Stadium, Ta’if

=== Knockout stage ===
Quarter-finals
April 16 – Jeddah
Saudi Arabia (a.e.t.) | 2
Oman | 1
April 15 – Ta’if
Malaysia | 1
Syria U20 | 3
April 16 – Jeddah
Iran B | 2
Algeria U21 | 0
April 15 – Medina
Mali U23 | 0
Morocco B | 1

Semi-finals
April 18 – Jeddah
Saudi Arabia | 4
Syria U20 | 0
April 18 – Jeddah
Iran B | 1 (3)
Morocco B (p) | 1 (4)

Final
April 20 – Mecca
Saudi Arabia | 1
Morocco B | 0
Third place
April 20 – Mecca
Syria U20 | 0 (3)
Iran B (p) | 0 (5)

==== Quarter-finals ====
15 April 2005
20:35

| Mali U23 | 0–1 | Morocco B |
|---|---|---|
| | Report | Erraki 23' (pen.) |

Prince Mohammed bin Abdul Aziz Stadium, Medina

15 April 2005
20:35

| Malaysia | 1–3 | Syria U20 |
|---|---|---|
| Saiban 84' | Report | Al-Hamwi 31'; Al-Haj 36', 76' |

King Fahd Stadium, Ta’if

16 April 2005
15:30

| Iran B | 2–0 | Algeria U21 |
|---|---|---|
| Navazi 42' (pen.); Oladi 90+2' | Report |

Prince Abdullah al-Faisal Stadium, Jeddah

16 April 2005
21:00

| Saudi Arabia | 2–1 (a.e.t.) | Oman |
|---|---|---|
| Tamim 85'; Ameen 119' | Report | Fawzi Bashir 11' |

Prince Abdullah al-Faisal Stadium, Jeddah

==== Semi-finals ====
18 April 2005
17:50

| Iran B | 1–1 (a.e.t.) | Morocco B |
|---|---|---|
| Zohani 48' | Report | Erraki 72' (pen.) |
Penalties
| Navazi (penalty scored); Jabbari (penalty scored); Sadeghi (penalty scored); Shojaei (penalty missed); Nouri (penalty missed) | 3–4 | Penalty scored |

Prince Abdullah al-Faisal Stadium, Jeddah

18 April 2005
21:00

| Saudi Arabia | 4–0 | Syria U20 |
|---|---|---|
| Ameen 10', 60'; Sharifi 40'; Al-Zahrani 90+1' | Report |

Prince Abdullah al-Faisal Stadium, Jeddah

==== Bronze medal match ====
20 April 2005
17:45

| Syria U20 | 0–0 (a.e.t.) | Iran B |
|---|---|---|
| | Report |
Penalties
| Penalty scored Penalty missed | 3–5 | (penalty scored) Navazi; (penalty scored) Rajabzadeh; (penalty scored) Jabbari; (penalty scored) Teymourian; (penalty scored) A. Yousefi |

King Abdul Aziz Stadium, Mecca

==== Gold medal match ====
20 April 2005
21:00

| Saudi Arabia | 1–0 | Morocco B |
|---|---|---|
| Y. Al-Qahtani 48' | Report |

King Abdul Aziz Stadium, Mecca
Attendance: 35,000
Referee: Mohsen Torki (Iran)

== Medalists ==
| Event | Gold | Silver | Bronze |
|---|---|---|---|
| Men | Saudi Arabia; Mohamed Al-Deayea; Hamad Al-Montashari; Bandar Tamim; Nasser Al-Shamrani; Mohammed Ameen; Ahmed Al-Rawiee; Jaber Haqawi; Ahmed Al-Bahri; Kamel Al-Mousa; Hadi Sharifi; Saad Al-Zahrani; Yasser Al-Qahtani; Saeed Al-Wadani; Saad Al-Harthi; Abdu Hakami; Taisir Al-Jassim; Abdullah Al-Waked; Hassan Al-Otaibi; Abdulrahman Al-Qahtani; Saleh Bashir | Morocco B Ismail Kouha; Abderrahim Chkilit; Mustapha El Haddad; El Houssaine Ouchla; Adil Lotfi; Mohamed Bestara; Mounir El Hamdaoui; Mohamed Reda Mokhtari; Merouane Zemmama; Salaheddine Aqqal; Abdessamad Rafik; Hicham Jouaya; Imad Ait Aziz; Mohamed Lamrini; Talal El Karkouri; Tarik Miri; Younes Jalil; Zakaria Zerouali; Amine Trafeh; Issam Erraki; Khalid Bakhouch | Iran B Ershad Yousefi; Vahid Talebloo; Amir Hossein Yousefi; Sattar Zare; Javad Shirzad; Ali Ghorbani; Hamid Reza Farzaneh; Mohammad Navazi; Mehrdad Oladi; Fereydoon Fazli; Asghar Rameshgar; Ali Ashourizad; Pejman Nouri; Yadollah Akbari; Ebrahim Taghipour; Mojtaba Jabbari; Reza Haj-Osbouei; Amir Hossein Sadeghi; Masoud Shojaei; Mehdi Rajabzadeh; Andranik Teymourian; Hamidreza Zohani |

2005 Islamic Solidarity Games

Saudi Arabia
1st title

== Statistics ==
=== Goalscorers ===
There were 73 goals scored in 26 matches, for an average of 2.81 goals per match.

6 goals

- (Iran) Mehrdad Oladi

5 goals

- (Saudi Arabia) Mohammed Ameen

4 goals

- (Sudan) James Moga

3 goals

- (Iran) Fereydoon Fazli
- (Morocco) Issam Erraki
- (Oman) Imad Al-Hosni
- Syria U20 Majed Al Haj

2 goals

- (Algeria) Sofiane Hanitser
- (Iran) Mojtaba Jabbari
- (Iran) Mohammad Navazi
- (Saudi Arabia) Abdullah Al-Waked
- (Saudi Arabia) Saad Al-Harthi
- (Saudi Arabia) Saeed Al-Wadani
- (Saudi Arabia) Saad Al-Zahrani
- (Saudi Arabia) Yasser Al-Qahtani
- (Malaysia) Mohd Fadzli Saari
- (Oman) Fawzi Bashir

1 goal

- (Algeria) Hocine Metref
- (Algeria) Bouazza Feham
- (Iran) Ebrahim Taghipour
- (Iran) Hamid Reza Farzaneh
- (Iran) Hamid Reza Zohani
- (Saudi Arabia) Abdu Hakami
- (Saudi Arabia) Saleh Bashir
- (Saudi Arabia) Bandar Tamim
- (Saudi Arabia) Hadi Sharifi
- (Malaysia) Ahmad Tharmini Saiban
- (Morocco) Tarik Miri
- (Sudan) Musab Ahmed
- (Syria) Safeer Atasy
- (Syria) Mohammad Al-Hamwi
