= Hasan Behvandi Kiya =

Iranian footballer

Personal information
- Full name: Hasan Behvandi Kiya
- Date of birth: July 13, 1991 (age 35)
- Place of birth: Ramhormoz, Iran
- Height: 1.68 m (5 ft 6 in)
- Position: Midfielder

Team information
- Current team: Persepolis

Youth career
- 2009–10: Foolad
- Esteghlal Ahvaz

Senior career*
Years	Team	Apps	(Gls)
2015–2017	Esteghlal Ahvaz	26	(6)
2017–	Siah Jamegan	0	(0)
- * Club domestic league appearances and goals

Hasan Behvandi Kiya (Persian: حسن بهوندی کیا) is an Iranian football midfielder who plays for Esteghlal Ahvaz in the Iran Pro League.

== Club career ==
Mousavi promoted to Esteghlal Ahvaz first team in summer 2015. He made his professional debut for Esteghlal Ahvaz on December 23, 2015, against Pespolis where he used as a substitute for Danial Mousavi.

Club career statistics as of December 23, 2015
Club	Division	Season	League		Hazfi Cup		Asia		Total	
Club	Division	Season	Apps	Goals	Apps	Goals	Apps	Goals	Apps	Goals
Esteghlal Ahvaz	Pro League	2015–16	1	6	2	3	0	0	3	9
Career totals			1	6	2	3	0	0	3	9
