= List of Iranian football transfers winter 2017–18 =

This is a list of Iranian football transfers for the 2017–18 winter transfer window. Transfers of Iran Pro League are listed. Transfer window will open on December 19, 2017 and will be open until January 16, 2018.

== Iran Pro League ==
=== Esteghlal ===
Head coach: (Germany) Winfried Schäfer

In: Note: Flags indicate national team as defined under FIFA eligibility rules; some limited exceptions apply. Players may hold more than one non-FIFA nationality.

| No. | Pos. | Nation | Player |
|---|---|---|---|
| 28 | MF | IRN | Mohsen Karimi (from Free agent) |
| 77 | MF | IRN | Behnam Barzay (from Free agent) |
| 10 | MF | MKD | Bojan Najdenov (from (Egypt) Smouha) |
| 7 | FW | SEN | Mame Baba Thiam (from (Italy) Juventus) |

Out: Note: Flags indicate national team as defined under FIFA eligibility rules; some limited exceptions apply. Players may hold more than one non-FIFA nationality.

| No. | Pos. | Nation | Player |
|---|---|---|---|
| 7 | FW | IRN | Hassan Beyt Saeed (to Foolad) |
| 10 | FW | IRN | Sajjad Shahbazzadeh (to Qatar SC) |
| 15 | DF | ARM | Hrayr Mkoyan (Released) |
| 17 | MF | IRN | Yaghoub Karimi (to Esteghlal Khuzestan) |
| 30 | DF | IRN | Azim Gök (on loan to Malavan) |

=== Esteghlal Khuzestan ===
Head coach: (Iran) Abdollah Veisi

In: Note: Flags indicate national team as defined under FIFA eligibility rules; some limited exceptions apply. Players may hold more than one non-FIFA nationality.

| No. | Pos. | Nation | Player |
|---|---|---|---|
| — | MF | IRN | Naser Ghalavand (from Sepahan) |
| — | MF | IRN | Adel Kolahkaj (from Esteghlal Ahvaz) |
| — | DF | IRN | Mohammad Aram Tab (from Free Agent) |
| — | FW | IRN | Esmaeil Sharifat (from Zob Ahan) |
| — | FW | IRN | Yaghoub Karimi (from Esteghlal) |
| — | MF | IRN | Mohammad Sharifi (loan from Saipa) |

Out: Note: Flags indicate national team as defined under FIFA eligibility rules; some limited exceptions apply. Players may hold more than one non-FIFA nationality.

| No. | Pos. | Nation | Player |

=== Foolad ===
Head coach: (Iran) Sirous Pourmousavi

In: Note: Flags indicate national team as defined under FIFA eligibility rules; some limited exceptions apply. Players may hold more than one non-FIFA nationality.

| No. | Pos. | Nation | Player |
|---|---|---|---|
| 7 | FW | IRN | Hassan Beyt Saeed (from Esteghlal) |

Out: Note: Flags indicate national team as defined under FIFA eligibility rules; some limited exceptions apply. Players may hold more than one non-FIFA nationality.

| No. | Pos. | Nation | Player |

=== Gostaresh Foulad ===
Head coach: (Iran) Firouz Karimi

In: Note: Flags indicate national team as defined under FIFA eligibility rules; some limited exceptions apply. Players may hold more than one non-FIFA nationality.

| No. | Pos. | Nation | Player |

Out: Note: Flags indicate national team as defined under FIFA eligibility rules; some limited exceptions apply. Players may hold more than one non-FIFA nationality.

| No. | Pos. | Nation | Player |
|---|---|---|---|
| — | DF | IRN | Milad Fakhreddini (to Zob Ahan) |

=== Naft Tehran ===
Head coach: (Iran) Hamid Derakhshan

In: Note: Flags indicate national team as defined under FIFA eligibility rules; some limited exceptions apply. Players may hold more than one non-FIFA nationality.

| No. | Pos. | Nation | Player |

Out: Note: Flags indicate national team as defined under FIFA eligibility rules; some limited exceptions apply. Players may hold more than one non-FIFA nationality.

| No. | Pos. | Nation | Player |

=== Padideh ===
Head coach: (Iran) Mohammad Reza Mohajeri

In: Note: Flags indicate national team as defined under FIFA eligibility rules; some limited exceptions apply. Players may hold more than one non-FIFA nationality.

| No. | Pos. | Nation | Player |
|---|---|---|---|
| — | MF | IRN | Hossein Fazeli (from Sepahan) |

Out: Note: Flags indicate national team as defined under FIFA eligibility rules; some limited exceptions apply. Players may hold more than one non-FIFA nationality.

| No. | Pos. | Nation | Player |

=== Pars Jonoubi Jam ===
Head coach: (Iran) Mehdi Tartar

In: Note: Flags indicate national team as defined under FIFA eligibility rules; some limited exceptions apply. Players may hold more than one non-FIFA nationality.

| No. | Pos. | Nation | Player |

Out: Note: Flags indicate national team as defined under FIFA eligibility rules; some limited exceptions apply. Players may hold more than one non-FIFA nationality.

| No. | Pos. | Nation | Player |

=== Paykan ===
Head coach: (Iran) Majid Jalali

In: Note: Flags indicate national team as defined under FIFA eligibility rules; some limited exceptions apply. Players may hold more than one non-FIFA nationality.

| No. | Pos. | Nation | Player |
|---|---|---|---|
| 45 | MF | IRN | Shahin Saghebi (from Sepahan) |

Out: Note: Flags indicate national team as defined under FIFA eligibility rules; some limited exceptions apply. Players may hold more than one non-FIFA nationality.

| No. | Pos. | Nation | Player |

=== Persepolis ===
Head coach: (Croatia) Branko Ivanković

In: Note: Flags indicate national team as defined under FIFA eligibility rules; some limited exceptions apply. Players may hold more than one non-FIFA nationality.

| No. | Pos. | Nation | Player |

Out: Note: Flags indicate national team as defined under FIFA eligibility rules; some limited exceptions apply. Players may hold more than one non-FIFA nationality.

| No. | Pos. | Nation | Player |
|---|---|---|---|
| 9 | FW | IRN | Mehdi Taremi (to (Qatar) Al-Gharafa) |

=== Saipa ===
Head coach: (Iran) Ali Daei

In: Note: Flags indicate national team as defined under FIFA eligibility rules; some limited exceptions apply. Players may hold more than one non-FIFA nationality.

| No. | Pos. | Nation | Player |
|---|---|---|---|
| — | DF | GHA | Samuel Sarfo (from (Ghana) Liberty Professionals) |

Out: Note: Flags indicate national team as defined under FIFA eligibility rules; some limited exceptions apply. Players may hold more than one non-FIFA nationality.

| No. | Pos. | Nation | Player |

=== Sanat Naft ===
Head coach: (Iran) Faraz Kamalvand

In: Note: Flags indicate national team as defined under FIFA eligibility rules; some limited exceptions apply. Players may hold more than one non-FIFA nationality.

| No. | Pos. | Nation | Player |

Out: Note: Flags indicate national team as defined under FIFA eligibility rules; some limited exceptions apply. Players may hold more than one non-FIFA nationality.

| No. | Pos. | Nation | Player |

=== Sepahan ===
Head coach: (Croatia) Zlatko Kranjčar

In: Note: Flags indicate national team as defined under FIFA eligibility rules; some limited exceptions apply. Players may hold more than one non-FIFA nationality.

| No. | Pos. | Nation | Player |
|---|---|---|---|
| 16 | MF | ALB | Edon Hasani (from (Albania) Vllaznia Shkodër) |
| 20 | FW | IRN | Mehdi Sharifi (Loan return from Tractor Sazi) |
| 66 | DF | IRN | Mohammad Ali Ahmadi (from Free agent) |
| 91 | GK | SYR | Ibrahim Alma (from (Syria) Al-Ittihad Aleppo) |

Out: Note: Flags indicate national team as defined under FIFA eligibility rules; some limited exceptions apply. Players may hold more than one non-FIFA nationality.

| No. | Pos. | Nation | Player |
|---|---|---|---|
| 1 | GK | BRA | Lee Oliveira (Released) |
| 9 | MF | IRN | Shahin Saghebi (to Paykan) |
| 15 | FW | IRN | Mehdi Alimoradi (Released) |
| 18 | MF | IRN | Amin Jahan Alian (Released) |
| 23 | MF | IRN | Naser Ghalavand (to Esteghlal Khuzestan) |
| 33 | DF | BRA | Jairo Rodrigues (to (Japan) Montedio Yamagata) |
| 37 | MF | IRN | Hossein Fazeli (to Padideh) |
| 50 | MF | BRA | Rafael Crivellaro (to (Portugal) Feirense) |

=== Sepidrood ===
Head coach: (Iran) Ali Nazarmohammadi

In: Note: Flags indicate national team as defined under FIFA eligibility rules; some limited exceptions apply. Players may hold more than one non-FIFA nationality.

| No. | Pos. | Nation | Player |

Out: Note: Flags indicate national team as defined under FIFA eligibility rules; some limited exceptions apply. Players may hold more than one non-FIFA nationality.

| No. | Pos. | Nation | Player |

=== Siah Jamegan ===
Head coach: (Iran) Alireza Marzban

In: Note: Flags indicate national team as defined under FIFA eligibility rules; some limited exceptions apply. Players may hold more than one non-FIFA nationality.

| No. | Pos. | Nation | Player |

Out: Note: Flags indicate national team as defined under FIFA eligibility rules; some limited exceptions apply. Players may hold more than one non-FIFA nationality.

| No. | Pos. | Nation | Player |

=== Tractor Sazi ===
Head coach: (Iran) Yahya Golmohammadi

In: Note: Flags indicate national team as defined under FIFA eligibility rules; some limited exceptions apply. Players may hold more than one non-FIFA nationality.

| No. | Pos. | Nation | Player |
|---|---|---|---|
| 18 | FW | BIH | Sulejman Krpić (from (Bosnia and Herzegovina) Sloboda Tuzla) |
| 5 | DF | CRO | Šime Gregov (from (Norway) Viking) |

Out: Note: Flags indicate national team as defined under FIFA eligibility rules; some limited exceptions apply. Players may hold more than one non-FIFA nationality.

| No. | Pos. | Nation | Player |
|---|---|---|---|
| 47 | FW | IRN | Mehdi Sharifi (Loan return to Sepahan) |

=== Zob Ahan ===
Head coach: (Iran) Amir Ghalenoei

In: Note: Flags indicate national team as defined under FIFA eligibility rules; some limited exceptions apply. Players may hold more than one non-FIFA nationality.

| No. | Pos. | Nation | Player |
|---|---|---|---|
| 69 | DF | IRN | Milad Fakhreddini (from Gostaresh Foolad) |
| 66 | DF | IRN | Khaled Shafiei (to (South Korea) FC Seoul) |
| 4 | MF | IRN | Akbar Imani (from Padideh) |
| 21 | MF | IRN | Bakhtiar Rahmani (from Paykan) |

Out: Note: Flags indicate national team as defined under FIFA eligibility rules; some limited exceptions apply. Players may hold more than one non-FIFA nationality.

| No. | Pos. | Nation | Player |
|---|---|---|---|
| 19 | DF | LBN | Ali Hamam (to (Lebanon) Nejmeh) |
| 6 | MF | IRN | Mehdi Mehdipour (from Tractor Sazi – conscription) |
| 10 | MF | IRN | Ehsan Pahlavan (from Tractor Sazi – conscription) |
| 23 | MF | IRN | Danial Esmaeilifar (from Tractor Sazi – conscription) |
| 20 | MF | IRN | Esmaeil Sharifat^{PL} (from Esteghlal Khuzestan) |
| 27 | FW | IRN | Iman Mousavi^{PL} (Released) |

Notes

- ^{PL} Pro League quota.

== See also ==
- List of Iranian football transfers summer 2016
- List of Iranian football transfers winter 2016–17
- List of Iranian football transfers summer 2017
