= Saad Al-Zahrani =

Saudi Arabian footballer

Personal information
- Full name: Saad Al-Zahrani
- Date of birth: 1 July 1980 (age 46)
- Place of birth: Saudi Arabia
- Position: Midfielder

Youth career
- -2001: Okaz

Senior career*
Years	Team	Apps	(Gls)
2001–2006	Al-Nassr		
2006–2007	Al-Faisaly		
2007–2008	Al-Wehda		
2008–2010	Al-Hazem		
2010–2013	Al-Najma		
2013–2014	Al-Jabalain		

International career
2002–2005	Saudi Arabia	5	(0)
- * Club domestic league appearances and goals

Saad Al-Zahrani (Arabic: سعد الزهراني; born 1 July 1980) is a Saudi Arabian football midfielder who played for Saudi Arabia in the 2004 AFC Asian Cup.

== Honours ==
=== International ===
Saudi Arabia

- Islamic Solidarity Games: 2005
