= Saleh Bashir =

Saudi Arabian footballer

Personal information
- Full name: Saleh Bashir Al Dosari
- Date of birth: 22 July 1980 (age 46)
- Place of birth: Dammam, Saudi Arabia
- Height: 1.78 m (5 ft 10 in)
- Position: Striker

Youth career
- 1995-2002: Al-Ittifaq

Senior career*
Years	Team	Apps	(Gls)
2002–2013	Al-Ittifaq	? 265	(78)
2013–2014	Al-Khaleej	4	(1)
2014–2015	Al-Ittifaq	22	(10)
2015	Al-Nahda		

International career
2003–2012	Saudi Arabia	24	(7)
- * Club domestic league appearances and goals

Saleh Bashir Al Dosari (Arabic: صالح بشير; born 22 July 1980) is a retired Saudi Arabian footballer. He famously played for Al-Ettifaq and the Saudi Arabia national team.Bashir played for Al-Ettifaq for 11 years, from 2002 to 2013. He was loaned to Al-Khaleej Club in September 2013 and moved to Al-Nahda in 2015. He retired from football in 2016. He scored 78 goals for Al-Ettifaq and participated in 265 matches. He is considered one of the team's all-time top scorers.

Bashir has made several appearances for the Saudi Arabia national football team, including his play at the 2007 Asian Nations Cup finals.

== Honours ==
=== International ===
Saudi Arabia

- Islamic Solidarity Games: 2005
