= Hamidreza Zohani =

Iranian footballer

Personal information
- Full name: Hamidreza Zohani
- Date of birth: 1980 (age 45–46)
- Place of birth: Iran
- Position: Striker

Team information
- Current team: Siah Jamegan (manager)

College career
Years	Team	Apps	(Gls)
2009	Islamic Azad University	6	(12)

Senior career*
Years	Team	Apps	(Gls)
–2004	Payam Mashhad		
2004–2007	Saba Battery	30	(7)
2007–2009	Saipa	18	(1)
2010–2011	Aboomoslem		
2011–2012	Iranjavan		

International career
2005	Iran B	3	(1)

Managerial career
- 2018–: Siah Jamegan
Medal record
Men's Football
Representing Iran
Islamic Solidarity Games
Bronze medal – third place	2005 Saudi Arabia	Team competition
World Interuniversity Games
Silver medal – second place	2009 Milan	Islamic Azad University
- * Club domestic league appearances and goals

Hamidreza Zohani (Persian: حمیدرضا زوهانی) is an Iranian footballer.

== Club career ==
Played for Payam Mashhad F.C., Saba Battery F.C. and Saipa F.C. He was recovering from an injury during the 2009/10 season. For 2010/11 he joined F.C. Aboomoslem.

Club performance			League		Cup		Continental		Total	
Season	Club	League	Apps	Goals	Apps	Goals	Apps	Goals	Apps	Goals
Iran			League		Hazfi Cup		Asia		Total	
2004–05	Saba	Persian Gulf Cup	7	5			-	-		
2005–06	Saba	Persian Gulf Cup	5	0				0		
2006–07	Saba	Persian Gulf Cup	18	2			-	-		
2007–08	Saipa	Persian Gulf Cup	13	1			0	0		
2008–09	Saipa	Persian Gulf Cup	5	0			-	-		
2010–11	Aboomoslem	Azadegan League	0	0	0	0	-	-	0	0
Total	Iran			8				0		
Career total				8				0		

== International career ==
He featured for the Iran national team 2005 Islamic Solidarity Games.
