= Hossein Bahrami =

Iranian football midfielder

Personal information
- Full name: Hossein Bahrami Kheshab
- Date of birth: 16 May 1995 (age 31)
- Place of birth: Behbahan, Iran
- Position: Midfielder

Team information
- Current team: Siah Jamegan
- Number: 22

Youth career
- Esteghlal Ahvaz

Senior career*
Years	Team	Apps	(Gls)
2014–2016	Esteghlal Ahvaz	46	(0)
2016–2018	Esteghlal Khuzestan	18	(1)
2018–	Siah Jamegan	6	(0)
2018–2020	Fajr Sepasi Shiraz F.C.	31	(0)
2020-	Esteghlal Khuzestan F.C.	59	(1)
- * Club domestic league appearances and goals as of 15 October 2016

Hossein Bahrami (born 1995) (Persian: حسین بهرامی) is an Iranian football midfielder who currently plays for Iranian football club Siah Jamegan in the Persian Gulf Pro League.

== Club career ==
Bahrami joined Esteghlal Ahvaz in summer 2014. He made his professional debut against Esteghlal on 21 August 2015 as a starter. Bahrami joined Esteghlal Khuzestan in the summer of 2016 after Esteghlal Ahvaz was relegated from the Persian Gulf Pro League.

== Club career statistics ==
As of 17 September 2015.

Club	Division	Season	League		Hazfi Cup		Asia		Total	
Club	Division	Season	Apps	Goals	Apps	Goals	Apps	Goals	Apps	Goals
Esteghlal; Ahvaz	Division 1	2014–15	19	0	0	0	–	–	19	0
Esteghlal; Ahvaz	Pro League	2015–16	2	0	1	0	–	–	3	0
Career Totals			21	0	1	0	0	0	22	0
