= Mehrdad Oladi =

Iranian footballer (1985–2016)

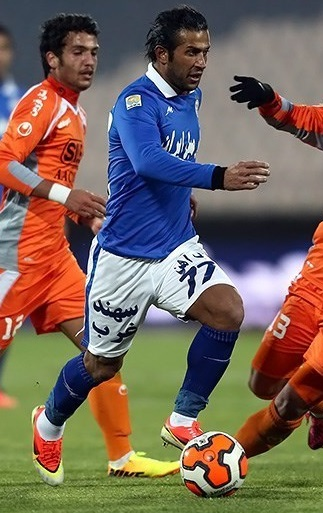
- Oladi while playing for Esteghlal, 4 December 2013

Personal information
- Full name: Mehrdad Oladi Ghadikolaei
- Date of birth: 25 May 1985
- Place of birth: Ghaemshahr, Mazandaran, Iran
- Date of death: 19 April 2016 (aged 30)
- Place of death: Tehran, Iran
- Height: 1.83 m (6 ft 0 in)
- Position: Forward

Youth career
- 2001–2003: Persepolis Ghaemshahr
- 2003–2006: Persepolis

Senior career*
Years	Team	Apps	(Gls)
2003–2006	Persepolis	48	(9)
2006	→ Al-Shabab (loan)	11	(0)
2006–2007	Al-Shabab	11	(3)
2006–2007	→ Persepolis (loan)	9	(3)
2008–2009	Al-Shabab	18	(7)
2009–2011	Malavan	32	(16)
2011–2012	Persepolis	18	(1)
2012–2013	Malavan	24	(3)
2013	Naft Tehran	10	(2)
2013–2014	Esteghlal	19	(2)
2014	Malavan	8	(1)
2016	Malavan	4	(0)

International career^{‡}
2004	Iran U20	3	(4)
2005–2007	Iran U23	15	(2)
2005	Iran B	6	(6)
2009–2014	Iran	13	(1)
Medal record
Representing Iran
Men's Football
West Asian Games
Bronze medal – third place	2005 Qatar	Team competition
Islamic Solidarity Games
Bronze medal – third place	2005 Saudi Arabia	Team competition
Asian Games
Bronze medal – third place	2006 Qatar	Team competition
- * Club domestic league appearances and goals as of 20 April 2016 ‡ National team caps and goals as of 11 November 2013

Mehrdad Oladi (Persian: مهرداد اولادی, May 25, 1985 – April 19, 2016) was an Iranian footballer who most recently played for Persepolis, Esteghlal, Naft Tehran, Malavan in the Iran Pro League. He usually played in the striker position.

== Club career ==
=== Start with Persepolis ===
Mehrdad Oladi started his career at IPL giants Persepolis before moving to Dubai outfit Al-Shabab for one season. In August 2006, he returned to Persepolis on a loan deal but moved back to Al-Shabab in March 2007 where he still had one year left of his two-year deal to serve.

He scored the winning goal in 61st match of Tehran derby on 3 November 2006 against Esteghlal, rivals of Persepolis. There had been interest shown by many Turkish and other European teams towards Oladi and his Iranian compatriot Mehrzad Madanchi.

=== Loan return to Persepolis ===
In September 2007, Oladi cancelled his contract with Al-Shabab and urgently went to the United States to deal with a family matter.

He returned to the United Arab Emirates in February 2008 and signed a six-month contract with Al-Shabab. In August 2012, Oladi was on trial with La Liga side, Xerez CD but move was cancelled.

He joined Malavan in the summer of 2009. Alongside Pejman Nouri, they had two great seasons with Malavan, reaching the final of the Hazfi Cup. He was the top scorer for Malavan with 15 goals in the 2010–11 season. In four games played in the Hazfi Cup, he scored five times.

=== Second return to Persepolis ===
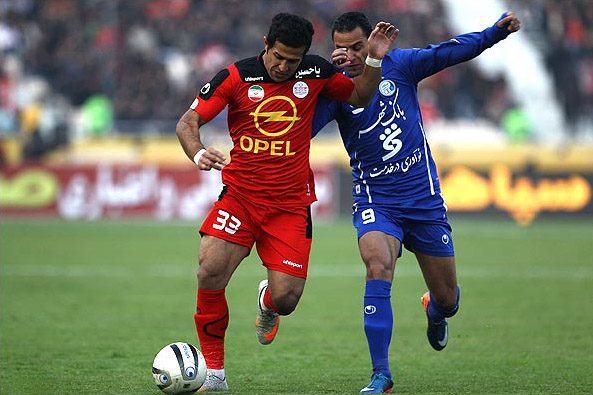
Oladi with Persepolis in December 2011

He played two seasons for Malavan and moved to Persepolis in the summer of 2011 and was used as a winger and striker. He returned to Malavan after one season at Persepolis in 2012. On 6 July 2013, he signed with Naft Tehran with a contract running until 2015.

=== Esteghlal ===
He joined Esteghlal on 11 November 2013, with a one-and-a-half-year contract.

=== Malavan ===
Oladi was released by Esteghlal in June 2014 and signed a contract with Malavan.

=== Club career statistics ===
As of 8 August 2014

Club performance			League		Cup		Continental		Total	
Season	Club	League	Apps	Goals	Apps	Goals	Apps	Goals	Apps	Goals
Iran			League		Hazfi Cup		Asia		Total	
2003–04	Persepolis	Pro League	5	0			–			
2004–05	Persepolis	Pro League	22	8			–			
2005–06	Persepolis	Pro League	16	1			–			
United Arab Emirates			League		President's Cup		Asia		Total	
2005–06	Al-Shabab	UAE League		0			–			
2006–07	Al-Shabab	UAE League	11	3			–		11	3
Iran			League		Hazfi Cup		Asia		Total	
2006–07	Persepolis	Pro League	9	3	1	0	–		10	3
United Arab Emirates			League		President's Cup		Asia		Total	
2008–09	Al-Shabab	UAE League	18	7	4	1	5	0	27	8
Iran			League		Hazfi Cup		Asia		Total	
2009–10	Malavan	Pro League	7	2	1	2	–		8	4
2010–11	Malavan	Pro League	25	14	6	6	–		31	20
2011–12	Persepolis	Pro League	17	1	1	0	0	0	18	1
2012–13	Malavan	Pro League	24	3	0	0	–		24	3
2013–14	Naft Tehran	Pro League	10	2	0	0	–		10	2
2013–14	Esteghlal	Pro League	19	2	4	1	2	0	25	3
2014–15	Malavan	Pro League	1	0	0	0	–		1	0
Total	Iran		127	33	15	10	0	0	142	42
Total	United Arab Emirates			10			5	0		
Career total				43			5	0		

- Assist Goals

Season	Team	Assists
10-11	Malavan	5
11–12	Persepolis	0

== International career ==
Oladi was a member of Iran national under-20 football team, and participated in the 2004 AFC Youth Championship held in Malaysia. He scored 4 goals in the match against Indonesia, helping them win 6–2, but wasn't enough for Iran to advance to the second round. He was a part of the Iran national under-23 football team that participated at the 2006 Asian Games. He also participated with Iran B national football team in the 2005 Islamic Games in Saudi Arabia, where he won third place with his team, and became the top scorer in the tournament with 6 goals (4 of them in the 9–0 win against Tajikistan).

=== International goals ===
Scores and results list Iran's goal tally first.

#	Date	Venue	Opponent	Score	Result	Competition
1	24 September 2010	Amman International Stadium, Amman, Jordan	Bahrain	3–0	3–0	2010 WAFF Championship

== Death ==
On 19 April 2016, Oladi died in Tehran's Tajrish Hospital at the age of 30 after suffering from cardiac complications.

== Honours ==
=== Club ===
Al Shabab

- UAE President's Cup: 2008-09 (Runner-up)

Malavan

- Hazfi Cup: 2010-11 (Runner-up)

=== National ===
Iran U23

- Asian Games Bronze Medal: 2006
