= List of Iranian football transfers winter 2016–17 =

This is a list of Iranian football transfers for the 2016–17 winter transfer window. Transfers of Iran Pro League is listed. Transfer window will open on 5 January 2017 and close on 2 February 2017.

== Players limits ==
The Iranian Football Clubs who participate in 2016–17 Iranian football different leagues are allowed to have up to maximum 35 players in their player lists, which will be categorized in the following groups:

- Up to maximum 18 adult (without any age limit) players
- Up to maximum 9 under-23 players (i.e. the player whose birth is after 1 January 1994).
- Up to maximum 8 under-21 players (i.e. the player whose birth is after 1 January 1996).

== Iran Pro League ==
=== Rules and regulations ===
According to Iran Football Federation rules for 2016–17 Persian Gulf Pro League, each Football Club is allowed to take up to maximum 6 new Iranian player from the other clubs who already played in the 2015–16 Iran Pro League season. In addition to these six new players, each club is allowed to take up to maximum 4 non-Iranian new players (at least one of them should be Asian) and up to 3 players from Free agent (who did not play in 2015–16 Iran Pro League season or doesn't list in any 2015–16 League after season's start) during the season. In addition to these players, the clubs are also able to take some new under-23 and under-21 years old players, if they have some free place in these categories in their player lists. Under-23 players should sign in transfer window but under-21 can be signed during the first mid-season.

=== Esteghlal ===
Head coach: (Iran) Alireza Mansourian

In: Note: Flags indicate national team as defined under FIFA eligibility rules; some limited exceptions apply. Players may hold more than one non-FIFA nationality.

No.	Pos.	Nation	Player
80	MF	UZB	Server Djeparov (from (Uzbekistan) Lokomotiv Tashkent)

Out: Note: Flags indicate national team as defined under FIFA eligibility rules; some limited exceptions apply. Players may hold more than one non-FIFA nationality.

No.	Pos.	Nation	Player
16	FW	IRN	Arash Afshin (to Esteghlal Khuzestan)
7	MF	IRN	Bakhtiar Rahmani (to Foolad)
55	DF	IRN	Mohammad Amin Hajmohammadi (to Machine Sazi)
20	MF	IRN	Meysam Majidi (to Saba Qom)
4	MF	IRN	Roozbeh Cheshmi (On loan to Saba Qom)
80	MF	UZB	Server Djeparov (On loan to Sepahan)

=== Esteghlal Khuzestan ===
Head coach: (Iran) Sirous Pourmousavi

In: Note: Flags indicate national team as defined under FIFA eligibility rules; some limited exceptions apply. Players may hold more than one non-FIFA nationality.

No.	Pos.	Nation	Player
—	FW	CMR	Aloys Nong (from Free Agent)
—	FW	IRN	Arash Afshin (from Esteghlal)
—	MF	IRN	Mostafa Mahi (from Fajr Sepasi)
—	DF	IRN	Farzad Jafari (loan return from Malavan)

Out: Note: Flags indicate national team as defined under FIFA eligibility rules; some limited exceptions apply. Players may hold more than one non-FIFA nationality.

No.	Pos.	Nation	Player
—	DF	IRN	Jalal Abdi (to Sepahan)
—	DF	IRN	Ezzatollah Pourghaz (to Saipa)
—	MF	IRN	Meysam Doraghi (to Foolad)

=== Foolad ===
Head coach: (Iran) Naeim Saadavi

In: Note: Flags indicate national team as defined under FIFA eligibility rules; some limited exceptions apply. Players may hold more than one non-FIFA nationality.

No.	Pos.	Nation	Player
—	MF	IRN	Bakhtiar Rahmani (from Esteghlal)
—	MF	IRN	Meysam Doraghi (from Esteghlal Khuzestan)

Out: Note: Flags indicate national team as defined under FIFA eligibility rules; some limited exceptions apply. Players may hold more than one non-FIFA nationality.

No.	Pos.	Nation	Player

=== FC Mashhad ===
Head coach: (Iran) Khodadad Azizi (interim)

In: Note: Flags indicate national team as defined under FIFA eligibility rules; some limited exceptions apply. Players may hold more than one non-FIFA nationality.

No.	Pos.	Nation	Player
—	MF	IRN	Milad Meydavoudi (from Rah Ahan)

Out: Note: Flags indicate national team as defined under FIFA eligibility rules; some limited exceptions apply. Players may hold more than one non-FIFA nationality.

No.	Pos.	Nation	Player
—	MF	IRN	Ayoub Kalantari (to Saipa)
—	DF	IRN	Alireza Nourmohammadi (to Sanat Naft Abadan)
—	DF	IRN	Hamidreza Aliasgari (to Machine Sazi)

=== Gostaresh Foulad ===
Head coach: (Iran) Faraz Kamalvand

In: Note: Flags indicate national team as defined under FIFA eligibility rules; some limited exceptions apply. Players may hold more than one non-FIFA nationality.

No.	Pos.	Nation	Player

Out: Note: Flags indicate national team as defined under FIFA eligibility rules; some limited exceptions apply. Players may hold more than one non-FIFA nationality.

No.	Pos.	Nation	Player
99	FW	IRN	Mohammad Reza Khalatbari (to Saipa)

=== Machine Sazi ===
Head coach:

In: Note: Flags indicate national team as defined under FIFA eligibility rules; some limited exceptions apply. Players may hold more than one non-FIFA nationality.

No.	Pos.	Nation	Player
—	DF	IRN	Saeed Ghaedifar (from Sepahan)
—	FW	IRN	Shahab Zahedi (from Persepolis)
—	DF	IRN	Mohammad Amin Hajmohammadi (from Esteghlal)
—	DF	IRN	Hamidreza Aliasgari (from Siah Jamegan)

Out: Note: Flags indicate national team as defined under FIFA eligibility rules; some limited exceptions apply. Players may hold more than one non-FIFA nationality.

No.	Pos.	Nation	Player
—	FW	IRN	Saman Nariman Jahan (to Persepolis)
—	MF	IRN	Andranik Teymourian (to Naft Tehran)

=== Naft Tehran ===
Head coach: (Iran) Ali Daei

In: Note: Flags indicate national team as defined under FIFA eligibility rules; some limited exceptions apply. Players may hold more than one non-FIFA nationality.

No.	Pos.	Nation	Player
—	MF	IRN	Andranik Teymourian (from Machine Sazi)
—	FW	IRN	Sajjad Shahbazzadeh (from (Turkey) Alanyaspor)

Out: Note: Flags indicate national team as defined under FIFA eligibility rules; some limited exceptions apply. Players may hold more than one non-FIFA nationality.

No.	Pos.	Nation	Player

=== Padideh ===
Head coach: (Iran) Mohammad Reza Mohajeri

In: Note: Flags indicate national team as defined under FIFA eligibility rules; some limited exceptions apply. Players may hold more than one non-FIFA nationality.

No.	Pos.	Nation	Player
—	MF	CMR	David Wirikom (from free agent)
—	MF	IRN	Akbar Imani (from Foolad)
—	DF	IRN	Mohammad Ali Ahmadi (from free agent)

Out: Note: Flags indicate national team as defined under FIFA eligibility rules; some limited exceptions apply. Players may hold more than one non-FIFA nationality.

No.	Pos.	Nation	Player

=== Paykan ===
Head coach: (Iran) Majid Jalali

In: Note: Flags indicate national team as defined under FIFA eligibility rules; some limited exceptions apply. Players may hold more than one non-FIFA nationality.

No.	Pos.	Nation	Player
—	MF	FRA	Jérémy Manzorro (from (Bulgaria) Slavia Sofia)
—	DF	IRN	Mehran Mousavi (from Rah Ahan)

Out: Note: Flags indicate national team as defined under FIFA eligibility rules; some limited exceptions apply. Players may hold more than one non-FIFA nationality.

No.	Pos.	Nation	Player

=== Persepolis ===
Head coach: (Croatia) Branko Ivanković

In: Note: Flags indicate national team as defined under FIFA eligibility rules; some limited exceptions apply. Players may hold more than one non-FIFA nationality.

No.	Pos.	Nation	Player
—	FW	IRN	Saman Nariman Jahan (from Machine Sazi)
—	MF	IRN	Soroush Rafiei (from Tractor Sazi)

Out: Note: Flags indicate national team as defined under FIFA eligibility rules; some limited exceptions apply. Players may hold more than one non-FIFA nationality.

No.	Pos.	Nation	Player
8	MF	IRN	Ahmad Nourollahi (to Tractor Sazi on loan)
2	FW	IRN	Omid Alishah (to Tractor Sazi on loan)
—	FW	IRN	Shahab Zahedi (to Machine Sazi)

=== Saba Qom ===
Head coach: (Iran) Samad Marfavi

In: Note: Flags indicate national team as defined under FIFA eligibility rules; some limited exceptions apply. Players may hold more than one non-FIFA nationality.

No.	Pos.	Nation	Player
47	MF	IRN	Meysam Majidi (from Esteghlal)
4	MF	IRN	Roozbeh Cheshmi (On loan from Esteghlal)

Out: Note: Flags indicate national team as defined under FIFA eligibility rules; some limited exceptions apply. Players may hold more than one non-FIFA nationality.

No.	Pos.	Nation	Player
1	GK	IRN	Hamed Lak (to Saipa)

=== Saipa ===
Head coach: (Iran) Hossein Faraki

In: Note: Flags indicate national team as defined under FIFA eligibility rules; some limited exceptions apply. Players may hold more than one non-FIFA nationality.

No.	Pos.	Nation	Player
—	GK	IRN	Hamed Lak (from Saba Qom)
99	FW	IRN	Mohammad Reza Khalatbari (from Gostaresh Foolad)
—	DF	IRN	Ezzatollah Pourghaz (from Esteghlal Khuzestan)
—	MF	IRN	Ayoub Kalantari (from FC Mashhad)
—	FW	IRN	Mohammad Reza Soleimani (from Rah Ahan)

Out: Note: Flags indicate national team as defined under FIFA eligibility rules; some limited exceptions apply. Players may hold more than one non-FIFA nationality.

No.	Pos.	Nation	Player
17	FW	IRN	Masoud Hassanzadeh (to Sepahan)

=== Sanat Naft Abadan ===
Head coach: (Iran) Firouz Karimi

In: Note: Flags indicate national team as defined under FIFA eligibility rules; some limited exceptions apply. Players may hold more than one non-FIFA nationality.

No.	Pos.	Nation	Player
—	DF	IRN	Alireza Nourmohammadi (from FC Mashhad)
—	FW	IRN	Bahador Abdi (from Paykan)
—	DF	IRN	Ali Helichi ^{U23} (from Sepahan)

Out: Note: Flags indicate national team as defined under FIFA eligibility rules; some limited exceptions apply. Players may hold more than one non-FIFA nationality.

No.	Pos.	Nation	Player

=== Sepahan ===
Head coach: (Iran) Abdollah Veisi

In: Note: Flags indicate national team as defined under FIFA eligibility rules; some limited exceptions apply. Players may hold more than one non-FIFA nationality.

No.	Pos.	Nation	Player
14	FW	IRN	Masoud Hassanzadeh (from Saipa)
15	FW	IRN	Mehdi Alimoradi ^{U21} (from Sepahan U21)
18	MF	IRN	Naser Ghalavand ^{U21} (from Sepahan U21)
80	MF	UZB	Server Djeparov (On loan from Esteghlal)
88	DF	IRN	Jalal Abdi (from Esteghlal Khuzestan)

Out: Note: Flags indicate national team as defined under FIFA eligibility rules; some limited exceptions apply. Players may hold more than one non-FIFA nationality.

No.	Pos.	Nation	Player
2	DF	IRN	Ali Helichi (to Sanat Naft Abadan)
4	MF	IRN	Moharram Navidkia (Retired)
11	FW	IRN	Emad Mirjavan (to Oxin Alborz)
99	FW	TLS	Pedro Henrique Oliveira (to (South Korea) Daejeon Citizen)

=== Tractor Sazi ===
Head coach: (Iran) Amir Ghalenoei

In: Note: Flags indicate national team as defined under FIFA eligibility rules; some limited exceptions apply. Players may hold more than one non-FIFA nationality.

No.	Pos.	Nation	Player
—	MF	IRN	Ahmad Nourollahi (from Persepolis on loan)
—	FW	IRN	Omid Alishah (from Persepolis on loan)

Out: Note: Flags indicate national team as defined under FIFA eligibility rules; some limited exceptions apply. Players may hold more than one non-FIFA nationality.

No.	Pos.	Nation	Player
—	MF	IRN	Soroush Rafiei (to Persepolis)

=== Zob Ahan ===
Head coach: (Iran) Mojtaba Hosseini

In: Note: Flags indicate national team as defined under FIFA eligibility rules; some limited exceptions apply. Players may hold more than one non-FIFA nationality.

No.	Pos.	Nation	Player
—	FW	LBN	Rabih Ataya (from (Lebanon) Al Ansar)

Out: Note: Flags indicate national team as defined under FIFA eligibility rules; some limited exceptions apply. Players may hold more than one non-FIFA nationality.

No.	Pos.	Nation	Player

Notes

- ^{PL} Pro League quota.
