= Musab Ahmed =

Sudanese footballer

Personal information
- Full name: Musab Ahmed Alsharif Eisa
- Date of birth: 10 December 1993 (age 32)
- Place of birth: Juba, Sudan
- Position: Striker

Team information
- Current team: Al-Suqoor Club
- Number: 26

Senior career*
| Years | Team | Apps | (Gls) |
| 2014–2017 | Wad Nobawi Omdurman | | |
| 2017–2018 | Khartoum NC | | |
| 2018–2020 | Wad Nobawi Omdurman | | |
| 2020–2022 | El Hilal El Obeid | | |
| 2022-2024 | Al Ahli SC (Khartoum) | | |
| 2024 | Al-Dahra FC | | |
| 2024-2025 | Al-Suqoor Club | | |
| 2025-2026 | Al-Morooj SC | | |
| 2026- | Al-Rabita Al-Silaim SC | | |

International career^{‡}
| 2022– | Sudan | 3 | (1) |
- * Club domestic league appearances and goals as of 10:23, 3 October 2024 (UTC) ‡ National team caps and goals as of 19:27, 16 January 2022 (UTC)

Musab Ahmed Alsharif Eisa (Arabic: مصعب أحمد الشريف عيسى; born 10 December 1993) is a Sudanese professional footballer who plays as a striker for the Sudanese club El Hilal El Obeid, and the Sudan national team.

== International career ==
Ahmed made his international debut with the Sudan national team in a 2–2 friendly tie with Zimbabwe on 2 January 2022. He was subsequently part of the Sudan squad that was called up for the 2021 Africa Cup of Nations.
