= Amir Hossein Yousefi =

Iranian footballer (born 1977)

Personal information
- Full name: Amir Hossein Yousefi
- Date of birth: September 21, 1977 (age 49)
- Place of birth: Kiakola, Iran
- Position: Midfielder

Youth career
- Sepidrood

Senior career*
Years	Team	Apps	(Gls)
2001–2002	Pas	?	(?)
2002–2005	Saipa	?	(13)
2005–2007	Saba Battery	39	(0)
2007–2008	Sanat Naft	33	(5)
2008–2009	Damash Gilan	33	(2)
2009–2011	Mes	26	(0)
2011–2013	Saipa Shomal		
- * Club domestic league appearances and goals

Amir Hossein Yousefi (Persian: امیرحسین یوسفی, born September 21, 1977) is a retired Iranian football player who played in the midfielder position.

== Club career ==
Yousefi started his career at Pas Tehran, before moving to another Tehrani club Saipa FC. There he enjoyed three good seasons, and in 2005 was transferred to Saba Battery.

=== Club Career Statistics ===
Last Update 1 September 2010

Club performance			League		Cup		Continental		Total	
Season	Club	League	Apps	Goals	Apps	Goals	Apps	Goals	Apps	Goals
Iran			League		Hazfi Cup		Asia		Total	
2001–02	Pas	Persian Gulf Cup		1			-	-		
2002–03	Saipa	Persian Gulf Cup		3			-	-		
2003–04	Saipa	Persian Gulf Cup		5			-	-		
2004–05	Saipa	Persian Gulf Cup	27	5			-	-		
2005–06	Saba	Persian Gulf Cup	21	0				0		
2006–07	Saba	Persian Gulf Cup	18	0			-	-		
2007–08	Sanat Naft	Persian Gulf Cup	33	5	1	0	-	-	34	5
2008–09	Damash	Persian Gulf Cup	33	2	0	0	-	-	33	2
2009–10	Mes	Persian Gulf Cup	26	0	1	0	7	0	34	0
2010–11	Mes	Persian Gulf Cup	0	0	0	0	-	-	0	0
Total	Iran			21				0		
Career total				21				0		

- Assist Goals

Season	Team	Assists
06–07	Saba	2
07–08	Sanat Naft	3
08–09	Damash	4
09–10	Mes	2
10–11	Mes	0
