= Omar Bari =

Qatari footballer

Omar S Barry
Personal information
- Full name: Omar S Barry
- Date of birth: July 18, 1986 (age 40)
- Place of birth: Seguela, Cote d’Ivoire
- Height: 1.89 m (6 ft 2 in)
- Position: Goalkeeper

Senior career*
Years	Team	Apps	(Gls)
2007–2008	El Jaish SC	12	(0)
2008–2021	Al Rayyan	134	(1)
2024	Al-Markhiya	6	(0)
2024–2026	Al-Shamal	2	(0)

International career
2010–	Qatar	2	(0)
- * Club domestic league appearances and goals

Omar Barry (born July 18, 1986) is a footballer who plays is a goalkeeper. Born in Côte d’Ivoire, he represented the Qatar national team.
