= Ali Helichi =

Iranian football defender (born 1995)

Personal information
- Date of birth: 7 October 1995 (age 31)
- Place of birth: Ahvaz, Iran
- Height: 1.81 m (5 ft 11 in)
- Position: Right back

Team information
- Current team: Fajr Sepasi
- Number: 3

Youth career
- Esteghlal Ahvaz

Senior career*
Years	Team	Apps	(Gls)
2014–2016	Esteghlal Ahvaz	23	(0)
2016–2017	Sepahan	7	(0)
2017–2018	Sanat Naft	9	(0)
2018	Shahrdari Mahshahr		
2018–2019	Khooneh Be Khooneh	10	(0)
2019–2025	Esteghlal Khuzestan	141	(2)
2025–	Fajr Sepasi	30	(1)
- * Club domestic league appearances and goals as of 30 October 2024

Ali Helichi (Persian: علی هلیچی; born 7 October 1995) is an Iranian football defender who plays for Iranian football club Fajr Sepasi in the Persian Gulf Pro League.

== Club career ==
Helichi joined Esteghlal Ahvaz in summer 2014. He made his professional debut against Gostaresh Foolad on 26 September 2015 as a substitute for Armin Mirdoraghi.

== Club career statistics ==
As of 30 November 2015.

Season	Club	Division	League		Hazfi Cup		Asia		Total	
Season	Club	Division	Apps	Goals	Apps	Goals	Apps	Goals	Apps	Goals
Esteghlal; Ahvaz	Division 1	2014–15	8	0	0	0	–	–	8	0
Esteghlal; Ahvaz	Pro League	2015–16	21	0	0	0	–	–	21	0
Career Totals			29	0	0	0	0	0	29	0
