= Meshki Pooshan F.C. =

Iranian football club

Siah Jamegan سیاه جامگان
- Full name: Siah Jamegan Khorasan Football Club
- Founded: 2011; 15 years ago
- Ground: Takhti Stadium
- Capacity: 15,000
- Owner: Mohammad Reza Abbasi
- Chairman: Seyyed Hashem Hosseini
- Head Coach: Hamidreza Zohani
- League: League 3
- 2018–19: Azadegan League, 17th (relegated)
- Website: https://www.instagram.com/meshkipooshanfc/
| Home colours | Away colours |

Siah Jamegan Football Club (Persian: باشگاه فوتبال سیاه جامگان, Bashgah-e Futbal-e Siah Jamigan) is an Iranian football club based in Mashhad, Iran. They used to play in the Persian Gulf Pro League. In August 2011 the club bought the license of second division side Golchin Robat Karim. Siah Jamegan is an offshoot and has the roots of heavily supported club Aboomoslem, sharing the same colours and kit.

On 28 April 2015, the club earned promotion to the Persian Gulf Pro League for the first time in the club's history.

== History ==
=== Establishment ===
In August 2011, Siah Jamegan Football Club was founded in Mashhad and was placed in the 2nd Division. In 2013, team were promoted to the Azadegan League. That following year Siah Jamegan finished second in their group and were placed in the promotion play-off. Siah Jamegan lost to Paykan 3–1 in the play-off and failed to be promoted to the Iran Pro League.

=== Success years ===
In August 2014, Siah Jamegan announced that they had bought Aboomoslem and will play in the Azadegan League under the name and logo of Aboomoslem, but the deal later fell through.

=== Persian Gulf Pro League ===
Siah Jamegan performed excellently in the 2014–15 season and for the first team in club history, the team was promoted to the Persian Gulf Pro League. They also competed in the final of the Azadegan League against Foolad Novin, but lost 1–0.

On 30 July 2015, Siah Jamegan lost its first ever Persian Gulf Pro League game 2–0 to Tehran club Esteghlal. After week four Rasoul Khatibi resigned as manager and was replaced by Saeed Ramezani. After a poor season, Meshki Pooshan Khorasan escaped relegation on the last day after beating Malavan 2–0.

Siah Jamegan's form did not improve in the 2016–17 season, they spent the season near the bottom of the table and only escaped relegation on the last day after beating league champions Persepolis 1–0. But the following season Siah Jamegan relegated to Azadegan League.

== Stadium ==
Takhti Stadium is the home stadium for Meshki Pooshan Khorasan. It can hold 15,000 spectators.

== Current technical staff ==
| Position | Name |
|---|---|
| Head coach | (Iran) Hamidreza Zohani |
| Assistant coaches | (Iran) Edmond Yunanpour (Iran) Hossein Kazemi (Iran) Majid Bajelan |
| Goalkeeper coach | (Iran) Sirous Sangchouli |
| Fitness and performance supervisor | |
| Fitness coach | (Iran) Hamid Taghavi |
| Analyst | |
| Physiotherapist | |
| Doctor | |
| Massager | |
| Team manager | (Iran) Armin Rahbar |
| Academy director | |
| U23 manager | |
| U19 manager | |
| U16 manager | |
| U14 manager | |
| Procurement | |
| Media director | |
| Organization Management | (Iran) Khodadad Azizi |

== Players ==
=== First-team squad ===
As of March 31, 2018
Note: Flags indicate national team as defined under FIFA eligibility rules; some limited exceptions apply. Players may hold more than one non-FIFA nationality.

| No. | Pos. | Nation | Player |
|---|---|---|---|
| 2 | DF | IRI | Mohammad Ali Faramarzi |
| 5 | DF | IRI | Mohsen Aghaei ^{U23} |
| 8 | MF | IRI | Mostafa Ahmadi |
| 10 | FW | IRI | Younes Shakeri |
| 12 | | IRI | Mohammad Seddigh ^{U21} |
| 14 | MF | IRI | Sobhan Khaghani ^{U19} |
| 16 | MF | IRI | Danial Mousavi ^{U21} |
| 17 | MF | IRI | Amir Mohammad Panahi ^{U23} |
| 18 | MF | IRI | Mohammad Mehdi Asgari |
| 19 | DF | IRI | Ali Davaran ^{U19} |
| 22 | MF | IRI | Hossein Bahrami ^{U23} |
| 23 | DF | IRI | Mirhani Hashemi |
| 24 | MF | IRI | Hamidreza Aliasgari |
| 33 | DF | IRI | Sajjad Dana ^{U23} |

| No. | Pos. | Nation | Player |
|---|---|---|---|
| 35 | FW | IRI | Majid Kiani ^{U21} |
| 36 | FW | IRI | Soheil Salehi ^{U21} |
| 44 | MF | IRI | Amir Hossein Salehi ^{U23} |
| 47 | DF | IRI | Hossein Badamaki (Captain) |
| 49 | MF | IRI | Amir Janipour ^{U19} |
| 61 | GK | IRI | Mohammad Hossein Eyn Asfhar |
| 69 | | IRI | Mehdi Ghadamgahi ^{U19} |
| 70 | MF | IRI | Payam Malekian |
| 71 | MF | IRI | Hossein Zamehran |
| 73 | DF | IRI | Vahid Asgari |
| 76 | | IRI | Erfan Derakhshandeh ^{U21} |
| 80 | MF | IRI | Ghasem Dehnavi |
| 88 | GK | IRI | Mohammad Reza Karami ^{U23} |
| 90 | FW | IRI | Emad Vazayefi ^{U19} |

For recent transfers, see List of Iranian football transfers summer 2017.

==== Loan list ====
Note: Flags indicate national team as defined under FIFA eligibility rules; some limited exceptions apply. Players may hold more than one non-FIFA nationality.

| No. | Pos. | Nation | Player |
|---|---|---|---|
| 3 | MF | IRI | Reza Sharbati (at Tractor till July 2020) |

== Head coaches ==
- (Iran) Seyed Kazem Ghiyassian (September 2011)
- (Iran) Armin Rahbar (October 2011)
- (Iran) Mohammad Reza Mohajeri (October 2011 – June 2015)
- (Iran) Rasoul Khatibi (June 2015 – August 2015)
- (Iran) Saeed Ramezani (August 2015 – September 2015)
- (Iran) Farhad Kazemi (September 2015 – October 2016)
- (Iran) Khodadad Azizi (October 2016 – February 2017)
- (Iran) Akbar Misaghian (February 2017 – October 2017)
- (Iran) Alireza Marzban (October 2017 – December 2017)
- (Iran) Reza Enayati (December 2017 – March 2018)
- (Iran) Davoud Mahabadi (March 2018 to July 2018)
- (Iran) Ali Hanteh (July 2018 to September 2018)
- (Iran) Hamidreza Zohani (September 2018 to Present)

== Season-by-season ==
The table below shows the achievements of the club in various competitions.

| Season | League | Position | Hazfi Cup | Notes |
|---|---|---|---|---|
| 2011–12 | League 2 | 4th/Group A | Round of 16 |
| 2012–13 | League 2 | 1st/Group B | First Round | Promoted |
| 2013–14 | Azadegan League | 2nd/Group A | Fourth Round |
| 2014–15 | Azadegan League | 2nd | Fourth Round | Promoted |
| 2015–16 | Persian Gulf Pro League | 13th | Round of 16 |
| 2016–17 | Persian Gulf Pro League | 14th | Round of 64 |
| 2017–18 | Persian Gulf Pro League | 16th | Round of 16 | Relegated |
| 2018–19 | Azadegan League | Disqualified | Round of 16 | Relegated (Two Divisions) |
| 2019–20 | 3rd Division |

== See also ==
- 2013–14 Hazfi Cup
- 2013–14 Azadegan League
