= Hamed Aghaei =

Iranian football forward

Personal information
- Full name: Hamed Aghaei
- Date of birth: September 27, 1997 (age 29)
- Place of birth: Ardabil, Iran
- Height: 1.87 m (6 ft 2 in)
- Position: Centre back

Team information
- Current team: Oxin Alborz
- Number: 5

Youth career
- 2013–2016: Shahrdari Ardabil
- 2016–2017: Persepolis

Senior career*
Years	Team	Apps	(Gls)
2016–2018	Persepolis B	12	(0)
2016–2018	Persepolis	0	(0)
2017–2018	→ Naft Tehran (loan)	20	(1)
2018–	Oxin Alborz	7	(0)
- * Club domestic league appearances and goals as of 5 February 2018 ‡ National team caps and goals as of Shahrdari Astara

Hamed Aghaei (Persian: حامد آقایی) is an Iranian football forward, who currently plays for Iranian football club Oxin Alborz in the Azadegan League. He can also play in both center back and left back positions.

== Club career ==
=== Persepolis F.C. ===
Aghaei joined Persepolis in summer 2016 with a contract until 2019.

=== Naft Tehran ===
Aghaei Loand Naft Tehran until end season.

=== Club career statistics ===
As of 5 February 2018

Club	Division	Season	League		Hazfi Cup		Asia		Total	
Club	Division	Season	Apps	Goals	Apps	Goals	Apps	Goals	Apps	Goals
Persepolis F.C.	Pro League	2016–17	0	0	0	0	–	–	0	0
Naft Tehran F.C.	Pro League	2017–18	5	1	2	0	–	–	0	0
Career total			5	1	2	0	0	0	0	0
