= Amir Zoleykani =

Iranian footballer

Personal information
- Date of birth: 19 August 1989 (age 37)
- Place of birth: Sari, Iran
- Height: 1.73 m (5 ft 8 in)
- Position: Midfielder

Team information
- Current team: MKN
- Number: 25

Youth career
- 2014–2015: Foolad

Senior career*
Years	Team	Apps	(Gls)
2014–2015	Foolad B	19	(6)
2015–2017	Sanat Naft	50	(10)
2017–2018	Foolad	12	(0)
2018–2019	Mes Kerman	10	(0)
2019	Fajr Sepasi	3	(0)
2019–2020	Khooshe Talaee	4	(0)
2021	Baadraan	4	(2)
2021–2022	Saipa	5	(0)
2023	Foolad B	11	(0)
2023–	MKN		
- * Club domestic league appearances and goals as of 1 June 2023

Amir Zoleykani (Persian: امیر زلیکانی; born 19 August 1989) also transliterated as Zoleikani, is an Iranian football midfielder who plays for MKN.

== Club career statistics ==
As of 7 April 2015.

Club	Division	Season	League		Hazfi Cup		Asia		Total	
Club	Division	Season	Apps	Goals	Apps	Goals	Apps	Goals	Apps	Goals
Sanat Naft	Division 1	2014–15	15	6	0	0	1	1	16	7
Career Totals			3	1	0	0	1	1	4	2
