= Mehdi Zobeydi =

Iranian footballer

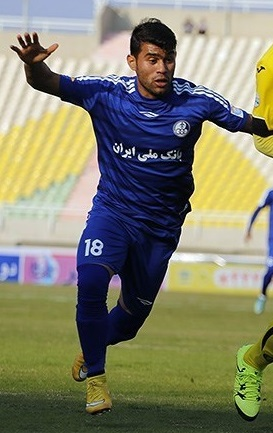

Personal information
- Full name: Mehdi Zobeydi
- Date of birth: November 30, 1991 (age 34)
- Place of birth: Ahvaz, Iran
- Position: Midfielder

Team information
- Current team: Sanat Naft Abadan
- Number: 11

Youth career
- 2008–2012: Foolad

Senior career*
Years	Team	Apps	(Gls)
2011–2015	Foolad	0	(0)
2012–2015	Foolad B	26	(7)
2015–2017	Esteghlal Khuzestan	31	(4)
2017–2018	Pars Jonoubi Jam	24	(1)
2018–2019	Foolad	26	(1)
2019	Gol Gohar Sirjan	7	(0)
2020	Naft Masjed Soleyman	12	(0)
2020–	Sanat Naft Abadan	16	(1)
- * Club domestic league appearances and goals as of 16 September 2017

Mehdi Zobeydi (Persian: مهدی زبیدی) is an Iranian professional football player who currently plays for Iranian football club Sanat Naft Abadan in the Persian Gulf Pro League.

== Club career ==
Zobeydi started his career with Foolad from youth levels. He moved to Foolad Novin in 2012. In Fall 2015, He joined to Esteghlal Khuzestan.

== Club career statistics ==
As of 31 October 2015.

Club	Division	Season	League		Hazfi Cup		Asia		Total	
Club	Division	Season	Apps	Goals	Apps	Goals	Apps	Goals	Apps	Goals
Foolad	Pro League	2011–12	0	0	0	0	–	–	0	0
Foolad Novin	Division 2	2012–13			0	0	–	–		
Foolad Novin	Division 2	2013–14	20	7	1	0	–	–	21	7
Foolad Novin	Division 1	2014–15	6	0	3	1	–	–	9	1
Esteghlal Kh.	Pro League	2015–16	5	1	0	0	–	–	5	1
Career Totals			31	8	4	1	0	0	35	9

== Honours ==
=== Club ===
Foolad Novin

- Azadegan League (1): 2014–15

Esteghlal Khuzestan

- Iran Pro League (1): 2015–16
- Iranian Super Cup runner-up: 2016
