= Danial Mousavi =

Iranian footballer

Personal information
- Full name: Seyed Danial Mousavi
- Date of birth: 8 July 1997 (age 29)
- Place of birth: Ahvaz, Iran
- Position: Midfielder

Team information
- Current team: Siah Jamegan

Youth career
- 2009–10: Foolad
- Esteghlal Ahvaz

Senior career*
Years	Team	Apps	(Gls)
2015–2017	Esteghlal Ahvaz	26	(6)
2017–	Siah Jamegan	0	(0)
- * Club domestic league appearances and goals as of 23 December 2015

Danial Mousavi (Persian: دانیال موسوی; born 8 July 1997) is an Iranian football midfielder who plays for Esteghlal Ahvaz in the Iran Pro League.

== Club career ==
Mousavi promoted to Esteghlal Ahvaz first team in summer 2015. He made his professional debut for Esteghlal Ahvaz on 23 December 2015 against Naft Tehran where he used as a substitute for Reza Ayyar.

== Club career statistics ==
As of 23 December 2015.

Club	Division	Season	League		Hazfi Cup		Asia		Total	
Club	Division	Season	Apps	Goals	Apps	Goals	Apps	Goals	Apps	Goals
Esteghlal Ahvaz	Pro League	2015–16	1	0	0	0	–	–	1	0
Career Totals			1	0	0	0	0	0	1	0
