= Jalal Abdi =

Iranian footballer (born 1993)

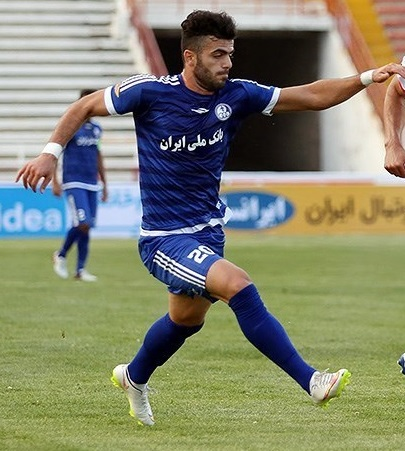

Personal information
- Full name: Seyed Jalal Abdi
- Date of birth: 26 December 1993 (age 32)
- Place of birth: Sari, Iran
- Height: 1.80 m (5 ft 11 in)
- Position: Right back

Team information
- Current team: Saipa
- Number: 4

Senior career*
Years	Team	Apps	(Gls)
2012–2013	Tarbiat Yazd	1	(0)
2013–2014	Foolad Yazd	3	(0)
2014–2015	Naft Masjed Soleyman	17	(0)
2015–2017	Esteghlal Khuzestan	24	(0)
2017	Sepahan	10	(0)
2017–2019	Fajr Sepasi	51	(1)
2019–2020	Mes Kerman	7	(0)
2020–2021	Esteghlal Khuzestan	20	(0)
2021–2023	Mes Kerman	41	(0)
2023	Fajr Sepasi	12	(1)
2023–2024	Mes Kerman	14	(0)
2024	Darya Caspian	16	(0)
2024–	Saipa	26	(0)

International career^{‡}
2015–2016	Iran U23	4	(0)
- * Club domestic league appearances and goals as of 22 April 2025 ‡ National team caps and goals as of 22 January 2016

Seyed Jalal Abdi (Persian: سيد جلال عبدی; born 26 December 1993) is an Iranian football defender who plays for Saipa in the Azadegan League.
