= Sirous Pourmousavi =

Iranian football manager

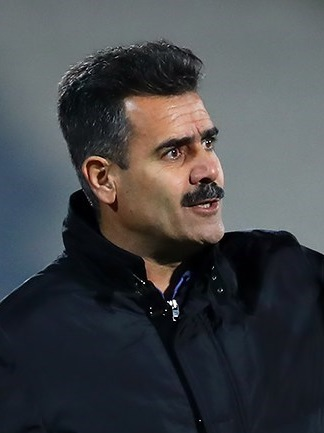
- Pourmousavi in 2017

Personal information
- Full name: Akbar Pourmousavi
- Date of birth: March 27, 1971 (age 55)
- Place of birth: Ahvaz, Iran
- Height: 1.79 m (5 ft 10 1/2 in)

Team information
- Current team: Sanat Naft (manager)

Managerial career
- Years: Team
- 2003–2004: Esteghlal Ahvaz
- 2011–2012: Esteghlal Khuzestan U21
- 2012–2016: Esteghlal Khuzestan (assistant)
- 2016–2017: Esteghlal Khuzestan
- 2017–2018: Foolad
- 2018–2020: Iran U19
- 2020: Pars Jonoubi Jam
- 2020–2021: Sanat Naft
- 2021: Naft M.I.S
- 2022–2024: Esteghlal Khuzestan
- 2025: Mes Rafsanjan
- 2025–2026: Sanat Naft
- 2026: Zob Ahan
- 2026–: Sanat Naft
- ‡ National team caps and goals as of Iran national under-20 football team

Sirous Pourmousavi (Persian: سیروس پور موسوی, born 27 March 1971) is an Iranian football coach and current manager of Sanat Naft.

== Statistics ==
As of 22 August 2018

Team	From	To	Record							
Team	From	To	G	W	D	L	GF	GA	+/-	Win %
Esteghlal Khuzestan	May 2016	May 2017	40	12	14	14	46	48	−2	30.00
Foolad	May 2017	September 2018	34	12	15	7	31	31	+0	35.29
Iran U20	December 2018	June 2020	0	0	0	0	0	0	+0	—
Total			74	24	29	21	77	79	−2	32.43

== Honours ==
=== Assistant manager ===
Esteghlal Khuzestan

- Iran Pro League (1): 2015–16
- Azadegan League (1): 2012–13

=== Manager ===
Esteghlal Khuzestan

- Iranian Super Cup runner-up: 2016
