= 2017–18 Persepolis F.C. season =

Persepolis
2017–18 season
- Chairman: Ali Akbar Taheri (until 1 November 2017); Hamid Reza Garshasbi (from 1 November 2017)
- Manager: Branko Ivanković
- Stadium: Azadi Stadium
- Persian Gulf Pro League: Winners
- Hazfi Cup: Quarter-finals
- 2017 AFC Champions League: Semi-finals
- 2018 AFC Champions League: Quarter-finals
- Iranian Super Cup: Winners
- Top goalscorer: League: Ali Alipour (19 goals); All: Ali Alipour (25 goals)
- Average home league attendance: 41,125
Home colours	Away colours

The 2017–18 season was the Persepolis's 17th season in the Pro League, and their 35th consecutive season in the top division of Iranian Football. They were also competing in the Hazfi Cup, Super Cup and AFC Champions League.

== Squad ==
=== First team squad ===
No.	Name	Age	Nationality	Position (s)	Since	App	Goals	Assist	Ends	Signed from	Transfer fee	Notes
Goalkeepers
1	Alireza Beiranvand	25	(Iran)	GK	2016	74	0	0	2022	Naft Tehran	Free	
12	Abolfazl Darvishvand	20	(Iran)	GK	2016	0	0	0	2021	Rah Ahan	Free	U-23
44	Božidar Radošević	28	(Croatia)	GK	2016	11	0	0	2018	(Hungary) Debreceni	Free	
Defenders
2	Sadegh Moharrami	21	(Iran)	RB / RM / RW	2016	44	0	3	2018	Malavan	Free	U-23
3	Shoja' Khalilzadeh	28	(Iran)	CB / RB	2017	35	5	0	2019	Sepahan	Free	
4	Jalal Hosseini	35	(Iran)	CB / RB	2016	94	3	3	2019	Naft Tehran	Free	
13	Hossein Mahini	31	(Iran)	RB / LB / CB	2012	142	3	6	2020	Zob Ahan	Free	
15	Mohammad Ansari	26	(Iran)	LB / CB / DM	2015	76	2	2	2019	Shahrdar Tabriz	Free	
20	Shahin Abbasian	20	(Iran)	RB / CB	2017	0	0	0	2020	Foolad	Free	U-21
38	Ehsan Hosseini	19	(Iran)	CB / DM	2017	0	0	0	2020	Academy	Free	U-21
69	Shayan Mosleh	24	(Iran)	LB / LM / CB	2017	18	1	1	2019	Sepidrood	Free	
Midfielders
5	Bashar Resan	21	(Iraq)	AM / RM / LM / CM	2017	19	0	1	2019	(Iraq) Al-Quwa Al-Jawiya	Free	U-21
8	Ahmad Nourollahi	24	(Iran)	DM / CM / RM / LM	2014	84	4	5	2019	Foolad Yazd	Free	
10	Farshad Ahmadzadeh	25	(Iran)	AM / RW / LW / SS	2012	85	14	11	2018	Parseh	Free	Academy graduated
11	Kamal Kamyabinia	28	(Iran)	DM / CM / RM / LM	2015	90	11	2	2018	Naft Tehran	Free	
18	Mohsen Rabiekhah	30	(Iran)	DM / CB / LB	2016	57	0	0	2018	Sanat Naft	Free	
21	Adam Hemati	22	(Iran) (Canada)	AM / RW	2017	1	0	0	2018	(Canada) Ryerson Rams	Free	U-23
25	Ehsan Alvanzadeh	23	(Iran)	LM / LW / SS	2016	13	0	0	2019	Naft Masjed Soleyman	Free	
26	Saeid Hosseinpour	19	(Iran)	CM / DM	2017	0	0	0	2020	Peykan	Free	U-21
77	Mohsen Mosalman	26	(Iran)	AM / LW / RW / CM	2015	75	7	25	2018	Zob Ahan	Rls.2.7 billion	
88	Siamak Nemati	23	(Iran)	RM / LM / AM / CM / SS	2017	21	3	1	2019	Peykan	Free	
Forwards
19	Vahid Amiri	29	(Iran)	LW / RW / SS / CF	2016	53	9	11	2018	Naft Tehran	Free	
23	Mohammad Amin Asadi	19	(Iran)	CF / SS	2017	0	0	0	2020	Academy	Free	U-19
37	Hamidreza Taherkhani	18	(Iran)	LW / RW / SS	2016	11	0	0	2021	Rah Ahan	Free	U-19; Academy graduated
39	Ahmad Baharvand	19	(Iran)	LW / RW / SS	2018	0	0	0	2020	Academy	Free	U-21
70	Ali Alipour	23	(Iran)	CF / RW / LW	2015	98	37	17	2021	Rah Ahan	Free	
90	Godwin Mensha	28	(Nigeria)	CF / SS	2017	41	12	2	2019	Paykan	Free	
Players left the club during the season
9	Mehdi Taremi	25	(Iran)	CF / AM / SS	2014	111	55	17	2018	Transferred to Al-Gharafa		

== New Contracts ==
No	P	Name	Age	Contract length	Contract ends	Source
1	GK	Alireza Beiranvand	24	5 season	2022	
4	CB	Jalal Hosseini	34	2 season	2019	
15	CB	Mohammad Ansari	25	2 season	2019	
11	CM	Kamal Kamyabinia	28	1 season	2018	
3	CB	Shoja' Khalilzadeh	28	1 season	2019	
37	SS	Hamidreza Taherkhani	18	3 season	2021	
70	CF	Ali Alipour	23	3 season	2021	

== Transfers ==
=== In ===
No	P	Name	Age	Moving from	Ends	Transfer fee	Type	Transfer window	Quota	Source
14	FW	Shahab Zahedi	20	Machine Sazi	2020	—	Loan return	Summer		
29	CM	Mohammad Rahmati	23	Machine Sazi	2020	—	Loan return	Summer		
90	FW	(Nigeria) Godwin Mensha	27	Paykan	2019	—	Transfer	Summer	PL	
3	CB	Shoja' Khalilzadeh	27	Sepahan	2018	—	Transfer	Summer	PL	
88	MF	Siamak Nemati	23	Paykan	2019	—	Transfer	Summer	PL	
69	DF	Shayan Mosleh	23	Sepidrood	2019	—	Transfer	Summer		
20	RB	Shahin Abbasian	20	Foolad	2020	—	Transfer	Summer		
23	FW	Mohammad Amin Asadi	18	Perspolis Academy	2020	—	Promotion	Summer		
38	CB	Ehsan Hosseini	18	Perspolis Academy	2020	—	Promotion	Summer		
26	CM	Saeid Hosseinpour	18	Peykan	2020	—	Promotion	Summer		
21	AM	Adam Hemati	22	(Canada) Ryerson Rams	2018	—	Transfer	Summer		
5	AM	(Iraq) Bashar Resan	20	(Iraq) Al-Quwa Al-Jawiya	2019	—	Transfer	Summer		
8	CM	Ahmad Nourollahi	25	Tractor Sazi	2019	—	Loan return	Summer		
39	FW	Ahmad Baharvand	19	Perspolis Academy	2020	—	Promotion	Winter		

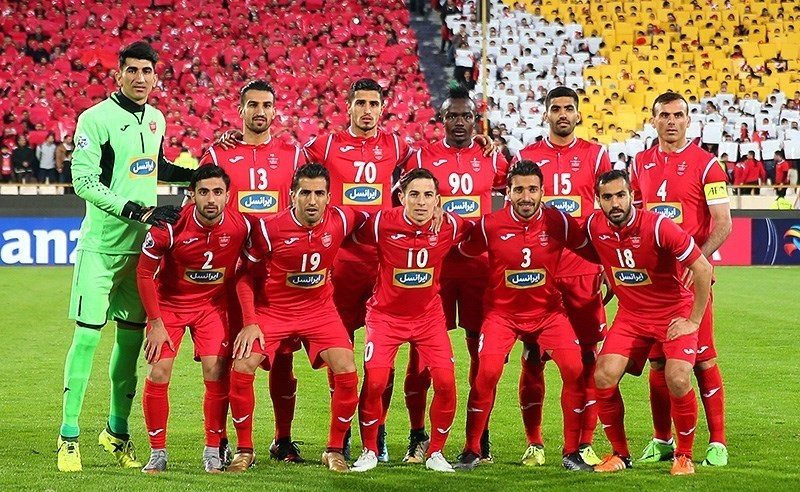
FC Persepolis in AFC Champions League 2018

=== Out ===
No	P	Name	Age	Moving to	Transfer fee	Type	Transfer window	Source
27	RB	Ramin Rezaeian	26	(Belgium) Oostende	Free		Summer	
14	FW	Shahab Zahedi	21	(Iceland) ÍBV	Free		Summer	
23	LB	Mohammad Aram Tab	31	Esteghlal Khuzestan	Free		Summer	
88	RW	Saman Nariman Jahan	25	Gostaresh Foolad	Free		Summer	
66	CM	Shahab Karami	26	Sepidrood	Free		Summer	
7	AM	Soroush Rafiei	27	(Qatar) Al-Khor	Free		Summer	
29	CM	Mohammad Rahmati	22	Saba Qom	Free		Summer	
5	CB	Hamed Aghaei	19	Naft Tehran	Free	Loan	Summer	
28	FW	Reza Karamolachaab	20	Esteghlal Khozestan	Free	Loan	Summer	
9	FW	Mehdi Taremi	25	(Qatar) Al-Gharafa	492 Th. €		Winter	
28	FW	Reza Karamolachaab	20	(Finland) KPV	Free		Winter	

== Technical staff ==
Position	Staff
Head coach	(Croatia) Branko Ivanković
Assistant coach	(Croatia) Zlatko Ivanković
First-team coach	(Iran) Karim Bagheri
Goalkeeping coach	(Croatia) Igor Panadić
Physical fitness trainer	(Croatia) Marko Stilinović
Analyzer	(Iran) Farzad Habibollahi
Doctor	(Iran) Dr. Alireza Haghighat
Physiotherapist	(Iran) Meysam Alipour
Team Manager	(Iran) Afshin Peyrovani
Media Officer	(Iran) Pendar Khomarlou

== Competitions ==
=== Overview ===
Competition	First match	Last match	Starting round	Final position	Record							
Competition	First match	Last match	Starting round	Final position	Pld	W	D	L	GF	GA	GD	Win %
PGPL	27 July 2017	27 April 2018	Matchday 1	Winners	30	19	7	4	48	15	+33	63.33
Hazfi Cup	21 October 2017	19 December 2017	Round of 32	Quarterfinals	3	2	1	0	5	2	+3	66.67
2017 ACL	22 August 2017	17 October 2017	Quarter-finals	Semi-finals	4	1	2	1	7	9	−2	25.00
2018 ACL	13 February 2018	14 May 2018	Group stage	Quarter-finals	8	5	1	2	12	7	+5	62.50
Super Cup	21 July 2017		Final	Winners	1	1	0	0	3	0	+3	100.00
Total					46	28	11	7	75	33	+42	60.87

Last updated: 28 April 2018
Source: Competitions

=== Persian Gulf Pro League ===
==== Standings ====
Pos	Team	Pld	W	D	L	GF	GA	GD	Pts	Qualification or relegation
1	Persepolis (C)	30	19	7	4	48	15	+33	64	Qualification for the 2019 AFC Champions League group stage
2	Zob Ahan	30	15	10	5	46	30	+16	55	Qualification for the 2019 AFC Champions League qualifying play-offs
3	Esteghlal	30	15	9	6	43	18	+25	54	Qualification for 2019 AFC Champions League group stage (Note: Esteghlal qualified to AFC Champions League group stage directly by winning the Hazfi Cup)
4	Saipa	30	15	9	6	40	34	+6	54	Qualification for the 2019 AFC Champions League qualifying play-offs
5	Pars Jonoubi Jam	30	11	14	5	34	24	+10	47	

Updated to match(es) played on April 13, 2018. Source: IPL Stats, Soccerway
Rules for classification: 1) Points; 2) Goal difference; 3) Goals scored.
(C) Champions

==== Results summary ====
Overall								Home						Away					
Pld	W	D	L	GF	GA	GD	Pts	W	D	L	GF	GA	GD	W	D	L	GF	GA	GD
30	19	7	4	48	15	+33	64	8	5	2	21	6	+15	11	2	2	27	9	+18

Last updated: 15 February 2018.
Source: Ipl Stats

==== Results by round ====
Round	1	2	3	4	5	6	7	8	9	10	11	12	13	14	15	16	17	18	19	20	21	22	23	24	25	26	27	28	29	30
Ground	H	A	A	H	A	H	A	H	A	H	A	H	A	H	A	A	H	H	A	H	A	H	A	H	A	H	A	H	A	H
Result	W	W	W	D	W	L	D	W	W	W	W	D	W	W	W	D	W	D	W	D	W	W	W	W	L	L	W	D	L	W
Position	2	2	1	1	1	2	3	2	1	1	1	1	1	1	1	1	1	1	1	1	1	1	1	1	1	1	1	1	1	1

Updated to match(es) played on 15 February 2018. Source: "iranleague". Archived from the original on 26 January 2018.
A = Away; H = Home; W = Win; D = Draw; L = Loss

==== Matches ====
Win Draw Loss Postponed

Date Round	Home	Score	Away	Location

27 July 2017 1	Persepolis	2 – 0	Foolad	Tehran
21:00 DST +04:30	V. Amiri 9'; Sh. Khalilzadeh 53'; A. Alipour (yellow card) 7' (yellow-red card) 70'	Report	I. Mobali (yellow card) 18'; A. Nasseri (yellow card) 58'; A. Abdollahzadeh (yellow card) 75'	Stadium: Azadi Stadium; Attendance: 30.000; Referee: Mohammad Hosein Zahedifard

3 August 2017 2	Tractor Sazi	1 – 2	Persepolis	Tabriz
19:30 DST +04:30	F. Hatami 41'; A. Taheran (yellow card) 80'	Report	G, Mensha 15'; K. Kamyabinia 67'; A. Beiranvand (yellow card) 90+2'	Stadium: Yadegar-e-Emam Stadium; Attendance: 45.000; Referee: Hossein Zargar

10 August 2017 3	Naft Tehran	0 – 3	Persepolis	Tehran
20:45 DST +04:30		Report	M. Taremi 47', 88' (yellow card) 78'; F. Ahmadzadeh 59'; M. Mosalman (yellow card) 38'	Stadium: Takhti Stadium; Attendance: 23.000; Referee: Alireza Faghani

16 August 2017 4	Persepolis	1 – 1	Meshki Pooshan	Tehran
20:45 DST +04:30	F. Ahmadzadeh 7'; Sh. Khalilzadeh (yellow card) 52'	Report	A. Panahi 85' (yellow card) 75'; M. Asgari (yellow card) 9'	Stadium: Azadi Stadium; Attendance: 42.000; Referee: Hamid Hajmalek

7 September 2017 5	Gostaresh Foulad	0 – 3	Persepolis	Tabriz
17:15 DST +04:30		Report	A. Alipour 71'; F. Ahmadzadeh 73' (yellow card) 86'; M. Taremi 77'; S. Moharrami (yellow card) 16'	Stadium: Bonyan Diesel Stadium; Attendance: 20.102; Referee: Mooud Bonyadifar

17 September 2017 6	Persepolis	0 – 1	Paykan	Tehran
20:00 DST +04:30	Sh. Khalilzadeh (yellow card) 66'	Report	M. Aghakhan 6' (yellow card) 6'; M. Momeni (yellow card) 28'; A. Karimi (yellow card) 60'	Stadium: Azadi Stadium; Attendance: 32.000; Referee: Alireza Faghani

21 September 2017 7	Sepahan	2 – 2	Persepolis	Isfahan
20:00 DST +04:30	M. Hussiein 61'; J. Alimohammadi 86' (yellow card) 87'; S. Yazdani (yellow card) 38'; H. Jafari (yellow card) 50'; M. Sarlak (yellow card) 87'	Report	M. Taremi 38' (pen.) (yellow card) 34'; A. Alipour 78'; F. Ahmadzadeh (yellow card) 78'	Stadium: Naghsh-e Jahan Stadium; Attendance: 38.000; Referee: Ashkan Khorshidi

11 December 2017 8	Persepolis	2 – 0	Sanat Naft Abadan	Tehran
16:15 IRST +03:30	A. Alipour 65', 88'; V. Amiri (yellow card) 68'	Report		Stadium: Azadi Stadium; Attendance: 17.000; Referee: Alireza Faghani

12 October 2017 9	Esteghlal Khuzestan	1 – 3	Persepolis	Ahvaz
17:00 IRST +03:30	R. Karamolachaab 34'; M. Coulibaly (red card)	Report	A. Alipour 16', 18'; Sh. Khalilzadeh 24'; G. Mensha (penalty missed) 40'	Stadium: Ghadir Stadium; Attendance: 15.000; Referee: Mohammad Hosein Zahedifard

26 October 2017 10	Persepolis	1 – 0	Esteghlal	Tehran
16:40 IRST +03:30	A. Alipour 23' (pen.); M. Rabiekhah (yellow card) 34'; K. Kamyabinia (yellow card) 78'; H. Mahini (yellow card) 88'	Report	R. Cheshmi (yellow card) 22'; F. Bagheri (yellow card) 50'; O. Ebrahimi (yellow card) 58'; V. Ghafouri (yellow card) 87'; M. Zakipour (yellow card) 89'; F. Esmaeili (yellow card) 90+5'; D. Shojaeian (yellow card) 90+6'	Stadium: Azadi Stadium; Attendance: 100.000; Referee: Bijan Heydari

31 October 2017 11	Saipa	0 – 2	Persepolis	Tehran
15:00 IRST +03:30	A. Shojaei (yellow card) 90+3'	Report	H. Kanaani 20' (o.g.); A. Alipour 25'; K. Kamyabinia (yellow card) 44'	Stadium: Takhti Stadium; Attendance: 11.000; Referee: Mohammad Hosein Zahedifard

20 November 2017 12	Persepolis	0 – 0	Padideh	Tehran
17:30 IRST +03:30		Report	A. Sadeghi (yellow card) 74'; M. Khanzadeh (yellow card) 84'; A. Imani (yellow card) 91'	Stadium: Azadi Stadium; Attendance: 18.000; Referee: Hossein Zargar

25 November 2017 13	Pars Jonoubi	0 – 1	Persepolis	Jam
15:00 IRST +03:30	H. Pour Amini (yellow card) 28'; M. Forouzan (penalty missed) 67'; A. Dashti (yellow card)	Report	Sh. Mosleh 90+6'; V. Amiri (yellow card) 25'; M. Mosalman (yellow card) 38'; A. Beiranvand (yellow card) 67'	Stadium: Takhti Stadium; Attendance: 12.000; Referee: Ashkan Khorshidi

1 December 2017 14	Persepolis	4 – 0	Zob Ahan	Tehran
16:30 IRST +03:30	A. Alipour 22'; K. Kamyabinia 35'; G. Mensha 70'; F. Ahmadzadeh 79'	Report	M. Tabrizi (penalty missed) 40'; Stanlley (yellow card) 67'; M. Hosseini (yellow card) 85'	Stadium: Azadi Stadium; Attendance: 35.000; Referee: Mohammad Hosein Zahedifard

6 December 2017 15	Sepidrood	0 – 1	Persepolis	Rasht
15:00 IRST +03:30	H. Kaebi (yellow card) 81'	Report	A. Alipour 82'; M. Rabiekhah (yellow card) 84'	Stadium: Sardar Jangal Stadium; Attendance: 12.000; Referee: Bijan Heydari

24 December 2017 16	Foolad	1 – 1	Persepolis	Ahvaz
14:30 IRST +03:30	R. Zahivi 89'; H. Lak (yellow card) 15'	Report	G. Mensha 14'; M. Ansari (yellow card) 20'; J. Hosseini (yellow card) 87'	Stadium: Ghadir Stadium; Attendance: 20.000; Referee: Mooud Bonyadifar

29 December 2017 17	Persepolis	2 – 0	Tractor Sazi	Tehran
14:30 IRST +03:30	A. Alipour 45'; K. Kamyabinia 78'	Report	M. Kiani (yellow card) 30'	Stadium: Azadi Stadium; Attendance: 70.000; Referee: Bijan Heydari

5 January 2018 18	Persepolis	0 – 0	Naft Tehran	Tehran
16:30 IRST +03:30	M. Mosalman (yellow card) 47'; Sh. Khalilzadeh (yellow card) 88'	Report	A. Amir Kamdar (yellow card) 78'	Stadium: Azadi Stadium; Attendance: 0 (Deprived of the spectator); Referee: Reza Mahdavi

12 January 2018 19	Meshki Pooshan	0 – 1	Persepolis	Mashhad
14:30 IRST +03:30	K. Amraei (yellow card) 43'; M. Asgari (yellow card) 79'; H. Omranzadeh (yellow card) 86'	Report	A. Alipour 90'; M. Rabiekhah (yellow card) 78'; K. Kamyabinia (yellow card) 83'	Stadium: Samen al-Aeme Stadium; Attendance: 25.000; Referee: Payam Heydari

18 January 2018 20	Persepolis	1 – 1	Gostaresh Foulad	Tehran
16:45 IRST +03:30	Nemati 90+5'; Hosseini (yellow card) 61'; Ahmadzadeh (yellow card) 64'; Amiri (yellow card) 82'; Radošević (yellow card) 90+6'	Report	Farhadi 74'; Maeboodi (red card) 87'	Stadium: Azadi Stadium; Attendance: 25.000; Referee: Mohammadreza Akbarian

26 January 2018 21	Paykan	1 – 3	Persepolis	Shahr-e Qods
15:30 IRST +03:30	Shiri 59'; Ikechukwu (yellow card) 45'; Sadeghi (yellow card) 56'; Daffé (yellow card) 80'; Moshkelpour (yellow card) 90+3'		Mensha 10'; Alipour 13', 83'; Nemati (yellow card) 51'; Khalilzadeh (yellow card) 76'	Stadium: Shahr-e Qods Stadium; Attendance: 25.000; Referee: Ali Safaei

3 February 2018 22	Persepolis	2 – 0	Sepahan	Tehran
17:00 IRST +03:30	Alipour 10'; Khalilzadeh 68'; Ahmadzadeh (yellow card) 55'; Khalilzadeh (yellow card) 84'		Aghaei (yellow card) 55'; Sharifi (yellow card) 51'	Stadium: Azadi Stadium; Attendance: 50,000; Referee: Mohammad Hosein Zahedifard

8 February 2018 23	Sanat Naft Abadan	0 – 3	Persepolis	Abadan
15:45 IRST +03:30	Baghlani (yellow card) 62'; Batista (yellow card) 78'		Ahmadzadeh 13'; Alipour 27', 54'; J. Hosseini (yellow card) 90+1'	Stadium: Takhti Stadium; Attendance: 13,000; Referee: Bijan Heydari

24 February 2018 24	Persepolis	1 – 0	Esteghlal Khuzestan	Tehran
18:30 IRST +03:30	Nemati 37'; Resan (yellow card) 51'		Nassari (yellow card) 39'; Aghil Kaabi (yellow card) 59'; Sharifat (yellow card) 66'	Stadium: Azadi Stadium; Attendance: 15,000; Referee: Koupal Nazemi

2 March 2018 25	Esteghlal	1 – 0	Persepolis	Tehran
15:45 IRST +03:30	Ghafouri 44' (yellow card) 52'; Thiam (yellow card) 45'; Esmaeili (yellow card) 52'; Djeparov (yellow card) 77'			Stadium: Azadi Stadium; Attendance: 100,000; Referee: Alireza Faghani

29 March 2018 26	Persepolis	1 – 2	Saipa	Tehran
18:45 IRST +03:30	Alipour 75' (pen.); Nemati (yellow card) 6'; Mahini (yellow card) 92'		Ramezani 22'; Khaledi 25'; Aliari (yellow card) 58'; Kalantari (yellow card) 94'	Stadium: Azadi Stadium; Attendance: 60,000; Referee: Ashkan Khorshidi

7 April 2018 27	Padideh	0 – 1	Persepolis	Mashhad
17:00 IRST +03:30	Khalatbari (yellow card) 51'		V. Amiri 77'; Kamyabinia (yellow card) 21'; Alipour (yellow card) 52'	Stadium: Samen al-Aeme Stadium; Attendance: 30,000; Referee: Bijan Heydari

12 April 2018 28	Persepolis	1 – 1	Pars Jonoubi	Tehran
19:00 IRST +03:30	Kamyabinia 90'; Ahmadzadeh (yellow card) 44'	Report	Salehi 56'	Stadium: Azadi Stadium; Attendance: 15,000; Referee: Saeid Rahimi Moghaddam

23 April 2018 29	Zob Ahan	2 – 1	Persepolis	Isfahan
18:00 IRST +03:30	Fakhreddini 70'; Kiros 87'; Sattari (yellow card) 19'; Hosseini (yellow card) 26'	Report	Alipour 48'; Ansari (yellow card) 31'	Stadium: Foolad Shahr Stadium; Attendance: 12,000; Referee: Hossein Zargar

28 April 2018 30	Persepolis	3 – 0	Sepidrood	Tehran
18:00 IRST +03:30	Ansari 31'; Ahmadzadeh 49'; Kamyabinia 84'; Moharrami (yellow card) 69'	Report	Nourmohammadi (yellow card) 33'	Stadium: Azadi Stadium; Attendance: 68,000; Referee: Mahdi Seyyed Ali

==== Score overview ====
Win Draw Loss

Opposition	Home score	Away score	Aggregate score
Esteghlal	1–0	1–0	1–1
Esteghlal Khuzestan	1–0	1–3	4–1
Foolad	2–0	1–1	3–1
Gostaresh Foulad	1–1	0–3	4–1
Pars Jonoubi	1–1	0–1	2–1
Naft Tehran	0–0	0–3	3–0
Padideh	0–0	0–1	1–0
Paykan	0–1	1–3	3–2
Sepidrood	3–0	0–1	4–0
Saipa	1–2	0–2	3–2
Sanat Naft	2–0	0–3	5–0
Sepahan	2–0	2–2	4–2
Meshki Pooshan	1–1	0–1	2–1
Tractor	2–0	1–2	4–1
Zob Ahan	4–0	2–1	5–2

=== Hazfi Cup ===
==== Matches ====
Win Draw Loss Postponed

Date Round	Home	Score	Away	Location

21 October 2017 Round of 32	Persepolis	2 – 0	Naft Tehran	Tehran
16:45 IRST +03:30	G. Mensha 73'; A. Alipour 83' (pen.) (yellow card) 90'; Sh. Khalilzadeh (yellow card) 63'	Report	H. Beikzadeh (yellow card) 35'; S. Aghazamani (yellow card) 62'; I. Alekasir (penalty missed) 91'	Stadium: Azadi Stadium; Attendance: 15.000; Referee: Mahdi Seyyed Ali

15 December 2017 Round of 16	Baadraan Tehran	1 – 2	Persepolis	Tehran
16:15 IRST +03:30	M. Rezaei 40' (yellow card) 35'; B. Afshar (yellow card) 34'		G. Mensha 36' (pen.) (yellow card) 21'; Sh. Khalilzadeh 53'	Stadium: Azadi Stadium; Attendance: 25.000; Referee: Hasan Akrami

19 December 2017 Quarter-finals	Persepolis	1 – 1 (a.e.t.) (4–5 p)	Sanat Naft Abadan	Tehran
14:30 IRST +03:30	F. Ahmadzadeh 26' (yellow card) 63'; K. Kamyabinia (yellow card) 42'; J. Hosseini (yellow card) 60'; H. Mahini (yellow card) 63'; Sh. Khalilzadeh (yellow card) 103'		A. Abdollahzadeh 48'; M. Ebrahimzadeh (yellow card) 56'; A. César (yellow card) 66'; M. Batista (yellow card) 75'; Z. Niknafs (yellow card) 99'; L. Pereira (yellow card) 103'; D. Noushi Soufiani (yellow card) 119'	Stadium: Azadi Stadium; Attendance: 6.000; Referee: Ashkan Khorshidi
	Penalties
	G. Mensha (penalty missed); H. Mahini (penalty scored); B. Resan (penalty scored); M. Ansari (penalty scored); A. Alipour (penalty missed); M. Rabiekhah (penalty scored); S. Nemati (penalty missed)		H. Baghlani (penalty missed); M. Ebrahimzadeh (penalty scored); Z. Niknafs (penalty missed); L. Pereira (penalty scored); T. Reykani (penalty scored); A. César (penalty scored); M. Batista (penalty scored)

=== Super Cup ===
Win Loss

Date Round	Home	Score	Away	Location

21 July 2017 Final	Persepolis	3 – 0	Naft Tehran	Tehran
21:00 (DST+04:30)	A. Alipour 18'; M. Mosalman 65'; F. Ahmadzadeh 83' (pen.) (yellow card) 42'	Report		Stadium: Azadi Stadium; Attendance: 40,000; Referee: Bijan Heydari

=== AFC Champions League ===
==== 2017 AFC Champions League ====
Win Draw Loss Postponed

Date Round	Home	Score	Away	Location

22 August 2017 Quarter-finals	Persepolis (Iran)	2 – 2	(Saudi Arabia) Al Ahli	Muscat, Oman
20:30 (DST+04:30)	Sh. Khalilzadeh 72' (yellow card) 86'; G. Mensha 84'	Report	O. Al-Somah 2'; Leonardo 58'; S. Al-Amri (yellow card) 41'	Stadium: Sultan Qaboos; Attendance: 6.500; Referee: (Jordan) Adham Makhadmeh; Man of the Match: S. Al-Amri
Note: Matches between teams from Iran and Saudi Arabia are played on neutral venues due to deterioration of Iran–Saudi Arabia relations.

12 September 2017 Quarter-finals	Al Ahli (Saudi Arabia)	1 – 3 (3 – 5 agg.)	(Iran) Persepolis	Abu Dhabi, United Arab Emirates
19:45 (DST+04:30)	S. Al-Amri 52'; W. Bakshween (yellow card) 36'; M. Hawsawi (red card) 81'	Report	A. Alipour 5'; G. Mensha 82' (pen.); M. Taremi 90+4' (pen.) (yellow card) 56'; K. Kamyabinia (red card) 12'; M. Mosalman (yellow card) 37'; M. Ansari (yellow card) 73'; H. Mahini (yellow card) 87'	Stadium: Mohammed Bin Zayed; Attendance: 5.820; Referee: (China) Ma Ning; Man of the Match: Mohsen Rabiekhah
Note: Matches between teams from Iran and Saudi Arabia are played on neutral venues due to deterioration of Iran–Saudi Arabia relations.

26 September 2017 Semi-finals	Al-Hilal (Saudi Arabia)	4 – 0	(Iran) Persepolis	Abu Dhabi, United Arab Emirates
19:30 (IRST+03:30)	O. Kharbin 31', 54', 81'; Y. Al-Shahrani 40'; A. Otayf (yellow card) 48' (red card) 49'; S. Al-Faraj (yellow card) 84'	Report	H. Mahini (yellow card) 73'	Stadium: Mohammed Bin Zayed; Attendance: 11.321; Referee: (South Korea) Kim Jong-hyeok; Man of the Match: Omar Kharbin
Note: Matches between teams from Iran and Saudi Arabia are played on neutral venues due to deterioration of Iran–Saudi Arabia relations.

17 October 2017 Semi-finals	Persepolis (Iran)	2 – 2 (2 – 6 agg.)	(Saudi Arabia) Al-Hilal	Muscat, Oman
20:00 (IRST+03:30)	G. Mensha 16', 61'; M. Ansari (yellow card) 26'	Report	O. Kharbin 30' (pen.), 76'	Stadium: Sultan Qaboos; Attendance: 3.250; Referee: (Oman) Ahmed Al-Kaf; Man of the Match: Godwin Mensha
Note: Matches between teams from Iran and Saudi Arabia are played on neutral venues due to deterioration of Iran–Saudi Arabia relations.

==== 2018 AFC Champions League ====
===== Group stage =====
Pos	Team	Pld	W	D	L	GF	GA	GD	Pts	Qualification	PER	SAD	NSF	WAS
1	(Iran) Persepolis	6	4	1	1	8	3	+5	13	Advance to knockout stage	—	1–0	3–0	2–0
2	(Qatar) Al-Sadd	6	4	0	2	11	5	+6	12	Advance to knockout stage	3–1	—	4–0	2–1
3	(Uzbekistan) Nasaf Qarshi	6	3	1	2	4	8	−4	10		0–0	1–0	—	1–0
4	(United Arab Emirates) Al-Wasl	6	0	0	6	3	10	−7	0		0–1	1–2	1–2	—

Source: AFC
Rules for classification: Group stage tiebreakers

===== Matches =====
Win Draw Loss Postponed

Date Round	Home	Score	Away	Location

13 February 2018 1	Persepolis (Iran)	3 – 0	(Uzbekistan) Nasaf	Tehran, Iran
17:15 UTC+3:30	Mensha 20'; Alipour 66', 71'	Report	Mukhiddinov (yellow card) 38'; Lukić (yellow card) 64'	Stadium: Azadi Stadium; Attendance: 25,830; Referee: (South Korea) Kim Dong-jin; Man of the Match: Ali Alipour

20 February 2018 2	Al-Sadd (Qatar)	3 – 1	(Iran) Persepolis	Doha, Qatar
19:00 UTC+3:30	Bounedjah 36', 51'; Khoukhi 66' (yellow card) 80'	Report	Nemati 90+4'; Khalilzadeh (yellow card) 35'; Ahmadzadeh (yellow card) 60'; Hosseini (yellow card) 75'	Stadium: Jassim Bin Hamad Stadium; Attendance: 5,842; Referee: (Singapore) Muhammad Taqi; Man of the Match: Baghdad Bounedjah

5 March 2018 3	Persepolis (Iran)	2 – 0	(United Arab Emirates) Al-Wasl	Tehran, Iran
17:15 UTC+3:30	Ahmadzadeh 36'; Alipour 41' (pen.); Beiranvand (yellow card) 87'	Report		Stadium: Azadi Stadium; Attendance: 33,170; Referee: (Iraq) Ali Sabah; Man of the Match: Farshad Ahmadzadeh

13 March 2018 4	Al-Wasl (United Arab Emirates)	0 – 1	(Iran) Persepolis	Dubai, United Arab Emirates
18:45 UTC+3:30	Al-Naqbi (yellow card) 17'; Al-Zaabi (yellow card) 21'; Al-Junaibi (yellow card) 31'	Report	Kamyabinia 37'; Khalilzadeh (yellow card) 45+2'	Stadium: Zabeel Stadium; Attendance: 5,841; Referee: (China) Ma Ning; Man of the Match: Farshad Ahmadzadeh

2 April 2018 5	Nasaf (Uzbekistan)	0 – 0	(Iran) Persepolis	Qarshi, Uzbekistan
19:00 UTC+4:30	Ganiev (yellow card) 76'	Report	Rabiekhah (yellow card) 83'; Nourollahi (yellow card) 90+4'	Stadium: Markaziy Stadium Qarshi; Attendance: 18,349; Referee: (Bahrain) Ali Abdulnabi; Man of the Match: Odiljon Hamrobekov

16 April 2018 6	Persepolis (Iran)	1 – 0	(Qatar) Al-Sadd	Tehran, Iran
19:30 UTC+4:30	Pouraliganji 3' (o.g.); Nemati (yellow card) 38'; Hosseini (yellow card) 45+1'; Khalilzadeh (yellow card) 90+5'	Report	Ró-Ró (yellow card) 43'; Xavi (yellow card) 73'	Stadium: Azadi Stadium; Attendance: 32,170; Referee: (Sri Lanka) Hettikamkanamge Perera; Man of the Match: Sadegh Moharrami

==== Round of 16 ====
7 May 2018 First leg	Al Jazira (United Arab Emirates)	3 – 2	(Iran) Persepolis	Abu Dhabi, United Arab Emirates
	Mabkhout 52'; Romarinho 77'; Mubarak 96'; Rashid (yellow card) 17'; Romarinho (yellow card) 69'; Boussoufa (yellow card) 88'		Alipour 42'; Mensha 84' (pen.); Kamyabinia (yellow card) 11'	Stadium: Mohammed bin Zayed Stadium; Attendance: 5,821; Referee: (Japan) Hiroyuki Kimura; Man of the Match: Ali Mabkhout

14 May 2018 Second leg	Persepolis (Iran)	2 – 1 (4a–4 agg.)	(United Arab Emirates) Al Jazira	Tehran, Iran
	Nourollahi 63'; Hosseini 89'; Mahini (yellow card) 45'; Nemati (yellow card) 49'; Ahmadzadeh (yellow card) 60'		Romarinho 70'	Stadium: Azadi Stadium; Attendance: 90,000; Referee: (China) Ma Ning; Man of the Match: Jalal Hosseini
Note: Persepolis won the game by away goals rule

=== Friendly Matches ===
==== Pre-season ====
Win Draw Loss

Date Round	Home	Score	Away	Location

4 July 2017	Persepolis	6 – 2	Persepolis U-23	Tehran
18:10 (DST+04:30)	M. Mosalman 42'; A. Alipour 60'; S. Hosseinpour; E. Alvanzadeh 76'; H. Taherkhani 85'; S. Nemati	Report	A. Baharvand 37' 43'	Stadium: Shahid Kazemi Stadium; Attendance: 2,500

6 July 2017	Kolos Kovalivka (Ukraine)	0 – 4	Persepolis	Koncha-Zaspa, Ukraine
20:00 (DST+04:30)	V. Havrylyuk (red card)	Report; Report	G. Mensha 19'; Sh. Khalilzadeh 45'; F. Ahmadzadeh 58'; A. Alipour 90'; F. Ahmadzadeh (yellow card)	Stadium: Kolos Stadium (Kovalivka); Attendance: 20

9 July 2017	Arsenal Kyiv (Ukraine)	0 – 0	Persepolis	Koncha-Zaspa, Ukraine
18:30 (DST+04:30)	?? (yellow card) ?? (yellow card) ?? (yellow card) ?? (yellow card); O. Shevchenko (red card)	Report	J. Hosseini (yellow card) 36'; B. Radošević (yellow card); A. Alipour (yellow card) 90+1'

12 July 2017	Stal Kamianske (Ukraine)	3 – 0	Persepolis	Koncha-Zaspa, Ukraine
18:30 (DST+04:30)	O. Kuzyk 7' (pen.), 33'; O. Schebetun ?? (yellow card) 78'; Neumber 5 (red card) 85'	Report; Report	F. Ahmadzadeh (yellow card); M. Mosalman (yellow card); S. Moharrami (red card) 85'; H. Taherkhani (yellow card)

==== During season ====
Win Draw Loss

Date Round	Home	Score	Away	Location

6 August 2017	Persepolis	2 – 1	Arvand Khorramshahr	Tehran
18:30 (DST+04:30)	M. Taremi 41'; H. Taherkhani 62'	Report	M. Nazari 81' (pen.)	Stadium: Shahid Kazemi Stadium; Attendance: 200

28 August 2017	Persepolis	6 – 0	Khosheh Talaee	Tehran
17:30 (DST+04:30)	F. Ahmadzadeh 10', 23'; G. Mensha 22'; A. Alipour 35', 46'; Sh. Abbasian 79'	Report		Stadium: Shahid Kazemi Stadium

31 August 2017 Charity Match	Razakan No	0 – 3	Persepolis	Karaj
18:50 (DST+04:30)		Report	A. Alipour 46', 54'; A. Nourollahi 68'	Stadium: Dr. Shariati Stadium; Attendance: 1500; Referee: Meysam Pourkarimiyan
Note: First time was 40 minutes and second time was 35 minutes.

6 November 2017	Persepolis	5 – 1	Kaveh Shahrdari Varamin	Tehran
16:00 IRST +03:30	S. Nemati 40'; A. Alipour 60', 68'; Sh. Mosleh 65'; M. Asadi 90'		85'	Stadium: Shahid Kazemi Stadium; Attendance: 300

14 November 2017	Persepolis	5 – 1	Parag	Tehran
IRST +03:30	A. Hemati (??), 70'; A. Alipour 30'; G. Mensha 40'; A. Nourollahi 85'		?? 35'	Stadium: Shahid Kazemi Stadium; Attendance: 300

27 January 2018	Persepolis	8 – 1	Parag	Tehran
12:00 (DST+04:30)	V. Amiri 30' (??), 65'; F. Ahmadzadeh 33' (pen.), 55'; E. Alvanzadeh 62' (pen.); Sh. Mosleh 70'; S. Hosseinpour 74'	Report	?? 2'	Stadium: Shahid Kazemi Stadium
Note: First time was 45 minutes and second time was 40 minutes.

14 February 2018	Persepolis	1 – 0	Shahab	Tehran
IRST +03:30	Sh. Mosleh	Report		Stadium: Shahid Kazemi Stadium

== Statistics ==
Player left the club during the season.

=== Scorers ===
Rank	No	N	P	Name	PGPL	Hazfi Cup	2017 ACL	2018 ACL	Super Cup	Total
1	70	(Iran)	FW	Ali Alipour	19	1	1	4	1	26
2	90	(Nigeria)	FW	Godwin Mensha	4	2	4	2	0	12
3	10	(Iran)	MF	Farshad Ahmadzadeh	6	1	0	1	1	9
4	11	(Iran)	MF	Kamal Kamyabinia	5	0	0	1	0	6
5	9	(Iran)	FW	Mehdi Taremi	4	0	1	0	0	5
5	3	(Iran)	DF	Shoja' Khalilzadeh	3	1	1	0	0	5
7	88	(Iran)	MF	Siamak Nemati	2	0	0	1	0	3
8	19	(Iran)	FW	Vahid Amiri	2	0	0	0	0	2
9	77	(Iran)	MF	Mohsen Mosalman	0	0	0	0	1	1
9	69	(Iran)	DF	Shayan Mosleh	1	0	0	0	0	1
9	15	(Iran)	DF	Mohammad Ansari	1	0	0	0	0	1
9	8	(Iran)	MF	Ahmad Nourollahi	0	0	0	1	0	1
9	4	(Iran)	DF	Jalal Hosseini	0	0	0	1	0	1
Own goal					1	0	0	1	0	2
Total					44	5	7	12	3	72
Last updated: 15 May 2018

- Top scorer of competition

=== Assists ===
Rank	No	N	P	Name	PGPL	Hazfi Cup	2017 ACL	2018 ACL	Super Cup	Total
1	77	(Iran)	MF	Mohsen Mosalman	10	0	0	0	1	11
2	19	(Iran)	FW	Vahid Amiri	7	0	0	2	0	9
3	10	(Iran)	MF	Farshad Ahmadzadeh	3	0	0	1	1	5
4	70	(Iran)	FW	Ali Alipour	2	0	2	0	0	4
5	2	(Iran)	DF	Sadegh Moharrami	2	0	0	1	0	3
6	15	(Iran)	DF	Mohammad Ansari	0	1	0	1	0	2
6	13	(Iran)	DF	Hossein Mahini	1	0	0	1	0	2
6	8	(Iran)	MF	Ahmad Nourollahi	2	0	0	0	0	2
9	9	(Iran)	FW	Mehdi Taremi	1	0	0	0	0	1
9	88	(Iran)	MF	Siamak Nemati	1	0	0	0	0	1
9	5	(Iraq)	MF	Bashar Resan	1	0	0	0	0	1
9	11	(Iran)	MF	Kamal Kamyabinia	1	0	0	0	0	1
9	69	(Iran)	MF	Shayan Mosleh	1	0	0	0	0	1
9	4	(Iran)	DF	Jalal Hosseini	0	0	0	1	0	1
9	90	(Nigeria)	MF	Godwin Mensha	1	0	0	0	0	1
Total					33	1	2	7	2	44
Last updated: 15 May 2018

- Assist leader of competition
- Second best assist provider of competition (shared with Mehdi Torabi)

=== Goalkeeping ===
				PGPL			Hazfi Cup			2017 ACL			2018 ACL			Super Cup			Total		
Rank	No	N	Name	M	GA	CS	M	GA	CS	M	GA	CS	M	GA	CS	M	GA	CS	M	GA	CS
1	1	(Iran)	Alireza Beiranvand	27	12	17	3	2	1	4	9	0	8	7	5	1	0	1	43	30	24
2	44	(Croatia)	Božidar Radošević	3	3	1													3	3	1
3	12	(Iran)	Abolfazl Darvishvand																		
Total				30	15	18	3	2	1	4	9	0	8	7	5	1	0	1	46	33	25
Last updated: 15 May 2018

- Most clean sheets of competition

=== Disciplinary record ===
==== Bookings & sending-off ====
				PGPL			Hazfi Cup			2017 ACL			2018 ACL			Super Cup			Total		
No	P	N	Name	Yellow card	Double yellow card	Red card	Yellow card	Double yellow card	Red card	Yellow card	Double yellow card	Red card	Yellow card	Double yellow card	Red card	Yellow card	Double yellow card	Red card	Yellow card	Double yellow card	Red card
1	GK	(Iran)	Alireza Beiranvand	2									1						3		
2	DF	(Iran)	Sadegh Moharrami	2															2		
3	DF	(Iran)	Shoja' Khalilzadeh	5			2			1			3						11		
4	DF	(Iran)	Jalal Hosseini	3			1						2						6		
5	MF	(Iraq)	Bashar Resan	1															1		
8	MF	(Iran)	Ahmad Nourollahi										1						1		
9	FW	(Iran)	Mehdi Taremi	2						1									3		
10	MF	(Iran)	Farshad Ahmadzadeh	6			1						2			1			10		
11	MF	(Iran)	Kamal Kamyabinia	4			1					1	1						6		1
13	DF	(Iran)	Hossein Mahini	2			1			2			1						6		
15	DF	(Iran)	Mohammad Ansari	2						2									4		
18	MF	(Iran)	Mohsen Rabiekhah	3									1						4		
19	FW	(Iran)	Vahid Amiri	3															3		
44	FW	(Croatia)	Božidar Radošević	1															1		
70	FW	(Iran)	Ali Alipour	1	1		1												2	1	
77	MF	(Iran)	Mohsen Mosalman	3						1									4		
88	MF	(Iran)	Siamak Nemati	2									2						4		
90	FW	(Nigeria)	Godwin Mensha				1												1		
Totals				43	1		8			7		1	14			1			74	1	1
Last updated: 15 May 2018

==== Suspensions ====
No.	Pos	Nat	Player	No. of matches served	Reason	Competition	Date served	Opponent(s)	Ref.
8	MF	(Iran)	Ahmad Nourollahi	23	Conscription problems	All; National competitions	21 July 2017	Naft Tehran	
8	MF	(Iran)	Ahmad Nourollahi	23	Conscription problems	All; National competitions	27 July 2017	Foolad	
8	MF	(Iran)	Ahmad Nourollahi	23	Conscription problems	All; National competitions	3 August 2017	Tractor Sazi	
8	MF	(Iran)	Ahmad Nourollahi	23	Conscription problems	All; National competitions	10 August 2017	Naft Tehran	
8	MF	(Iran)	Ahmad Nourollahi	23	Conscription problems	All; National competitions	16 August 2017	Meshki Pooshan	
8	MF	(Iran)	Ahmad Nourollahi	23	Conscription problems	All; National competitions	7 September 2017	Gostaresh Foulad	
8	MF	(Iran)	Ahmad Nourollahi	23	Conscription problems	All; National competitions	17 September 2017	Paykan	
8	MF	(Iran)	Ahmad Nourollahi	23	Conscription problems	All; National competitions	21 September 2017	Sepahan	
8	MF	(Iran)	Ahmad Nourollahi	23	Conscription problems	All; National competitions	12 October 2017	Esteghlal Khuzestan	
8	MF	(Iran)	Ahmad Nourollahi	23	Conscription problems	All; National competitions	21 October 2017	Naft Tehran	
8	MF	(Iran)	Ahmad Nourollahi	23	Conscription problems	All; National competitions	26 October 2017	Esteghlal	
8	MF	(Iran)	Ahmad Nourollahi	23	Conscription problems	All; National competitions	31 October 2017	Saipa	
8	MF	(Iran)	Ahmad Nourollahi	23	Conscription problems	All; National competitions	20 November 2017	Padideh	
8	MF	(Iran)	Ahmad Nourollahi	23	Conscription problems	All; National competitions	25 November 2017	Pars Jonoubi	
8	MF	(Iran)	Ahmad Nourollahi	23	Conscription problems	All; National competitions	1 December 2017	Zob Ahan	
8	MF	(Iran)	Ahmad Nourollahi	23	Conscription problems	All; National competitions	6 December 2017	Sepidrood	
8	MF	(Iran)	Ahmad Nourollahi	23	Conscription problems	All; National competitions	11 December 2017	Sanat Naft Abadan	
8	MF	(Iran)	Ahmad Nourollahi	23	Conscription problems	All; National competitions	15 December 2017	Baadraan Tehran	
8	MF	(Iran)	Ahmad Nourollahi	23	Conscription problems	All; National competitions	19 December 2017	Sanat Naft Abadan	
8	MF	(Iran)	Ahmad Nourollahi	23	Conscription problems	All; National competitions	24 December 2017	Foolad	
8	MF	(Iran)	Ahmad Nourollahi	23	Conscription problems	All; National competitions	29 December 2017	Tractor Sazi	
8	MF	(Iran)	Ahmad Nourollahi	23	Conscription problems	All; National competitions	6 January 2018	Naft Tehran	
8	MF	(Iran)	Ahmad Nourollahi	23	Conscription problems	All; National competitions	12 January 2018	Meshki Pooshan	
70	FW	(Iran)	Ali Alipour	1	Double yellow card in a match against Foolad	League	3 August 2017	Tractor Sazi	
9	FW	(Iran)	Mehdi Taremi	16 (4 Month since 23 September)	Suspended By FIFA for Breach of Transfer Rules	All competitions	26 September 2017	Al-Hilal	
9	FW	(Iran)	Mehdi Taremi	16 (4 Month since 23 September)	Suspended By FIFA for Breach of Transfer Rules	All competitions	12 October 2017	Esteghlal Khuzestan	
9	FW	(Iran)	Mehdi Taremi	16 (4 Month since 23 September)	Suspended By FIFA for Breach of Transfer Rules	All competitions	17 October 2017	Al-Hilal	
9	FW	(Iran)	Mehdi Taremi	16 (4 Month since 23 September)	Suspended By FIFA for Breach of Transfer Rules	All competitions	21 October 2017	Naft Tehran	
9	FW	(Iran)	Mehdi Taremi	16 (4 Month since 23 September)	Suspended By FIFA for Breach of Transfer Rules	All competitions	26 October 2017	Esteghlal	
9	FW	(Iran)	Mehdi Taremi	16 (4 Month since 23 September)	Suspended By FIFA for Breach of Transfer Rules	All competitions	31 October 2017	Saipa	
9	FW	(Iran)	Mehdi Taremi	16 (4 Month since 23 September)	Suspended By FIFA for Breach of Transfer Rules	All competitions	20 November 2017	Padideh	
9	FW	(Iran)	Mehdi Taremi	16 (4 Month since 23 September)	Suspended By FIFA for Breach of Transfer Rules	All competitions	25 November 2017	Pars Jonoubi	
9	FW	(Iran)	Mehdi Taremi	16 (4 Month since 23 September)	Suspended By FIFA for Breach of Transfer Rules	All competitions	1 December 2017	Zob Ahan	
9	FW	(Iran)	Mehdi Taremi	16 (4 Month since 23 September)	Suspended By FIFA for Breach of Transfer Rules	All competitions	6 December 2017	Sepidrood	
9	FW	(Iran)	Mehdi Taremi	16 (4 Month since 23 September)	Suspended By FIFA for Breach of Transfer Rules	All competitions	11 December 2017	Sanat Naft Abadan	
9	FW	(Iran)	Mehdi Taremi	16 (4 Month since 23 September)	Suspended By FIFA for Breach of Transfer Rules	All competitions	15 December 2017	Baadraan Tehran	
9	FW	(Iran)	Mehdi Taremi	16 (4 Month since 23 September)	Suspended By FIFA for Breach of Transfer Rules	All competitions	19 December 2017	Sanat Naft Abadan	
9	FW	(Iran)	Mehdi Taremi	16 (4 Month since 23 September)	Suspended By FIFA for Breach of Transfer Rules	All competitions	24 December 2017	Foolad	
9	FW	(Iran)	Mehdi Taremi	16 (4 Month since 23 September)	Suspended By FIFA for Breach of Transfer Rules	All competitions	29 December 2017	Tractor Sazi	
9	FW	(Iran)	Mehdi Taremi	16 (4 Month since 23 September)	Suspended By FIFA for Breach of Transfer Rules	All competitions	6 January 2018	Naft Tehran	
3	DF	(Iran)	Shoja' Khalilzadeh	1	Unsporting behavior	League	20 November 2017	Padideh	
4	DF	(Iran)	Jalal Hosseini	1	2nd yellow card	ACL	22 August 2017	Al-Ahli	
11	MF	(Iran)	Kamal Kamyabinia	1	Straight red card in a match against Al-Ahli	ACL	26 September 2017	Al-Hilal	
15	DF	(Iran)	Mohammad Ansari	1	2nd yellow card	ACL	26 September 2017	Al-Hilal	
3	DF	(Iran)	Shoja' Khalilzadeh	1	3rd yellow card	League	12 January 2018	Meshki Pooshan	
77	MF	(Iran)	Mohsen Mosalman	1	3rd yellow card	League	12 January 2018	Meshki Pooshan	
18	MF	(Iran)	Mohsen Rabiekhah	1	3rd yellow card	League	18 January 2018	Gostaresh Foulad	
11	MF	(Iran)	Kamal Kamyabinia	1	3rd yellow card	League	18 January 2018	Gostaresh Foulad	
10	MF	(Iran)	Farshad Ahmadzadeh	1	3rd yellow card	League	26 January 2018	Paykan	
19	MF	(Iran)	Vahid Amiri	1	3rd yellow card	League	26 January 2018	Paykan	
4	DF	(Iran)	Jalal Hosseini	1	3rd yellow card	League	24 February 2018	Esteghlal Khuzestan	
3	DF	(Iran)	Shoja' Khalilzadeh	1	2nd yellow card	ACL	2 April 2018	Nasaf	
3	DF	(Iran)	Shoja' Khalilzadeh	1	3rd yellow card	League	7 April 2018	Padideh	
4	DF	(Iran)	Jalal Hosseini	1	2nd yellow card	ACL	7 May 2018	Al Jazira	
Last updated: 15 May 2018

== Club ==
=== Kit ===
Supplier: (Spain) Joma

Iran Pro League, Hazfi Cup: Home Kit / Home Kit (alt) / Away Kit / 85th Derby Kit / 86th Derby Kit	Super Cup: Super Cup Kit	2017 AFC Champions League: Home Kit / Away Kit	2018 AFC Champions League: Home Kit / Away Kit

|} Source: "Persepolis FC' current kit".

=== Sponsorship ===
- Main sponsor: Irancell
- Official shirt manufacturer: Joma
- Official sponsor: Kosar Credit Cooperative
