= Sadegh Moharrami =

Iranian footballer (born 1996)

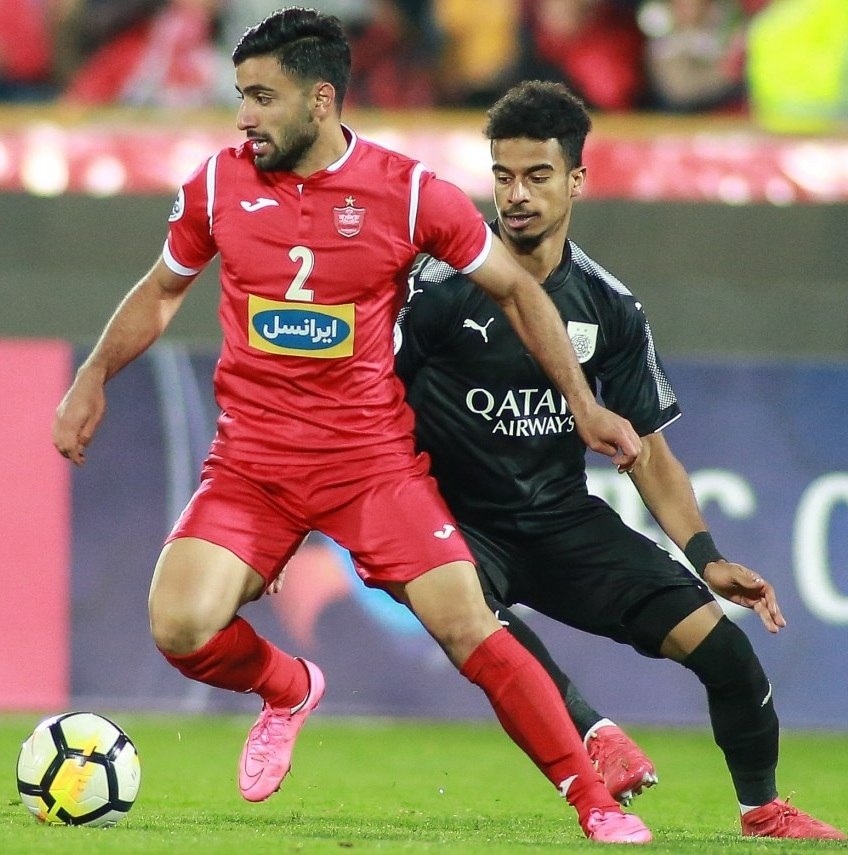
- Moharrami With Persepolis in 2018 AFC Champions League

Personal information
- Full name: Sadegh Moharrami Getgasari
- Date of birth: 1 March 1996 (age 30)
- Place of birth: Hashtpar, Iran
- Height: 1.74 m (5 ft 9 in)
- Position: Right-back

Team information
- Current team: Tractor
- Number: 18

Youth career
- Malavan

Senior career*
Years	Team	Apps	(Gls)
2012–2016	Malavan	36	(0)
2016–2018	Persepolis	43	(0)
2018–2025	Dinamo Zagreb	96	(1)
2019	Dinamo Zagreb II	1	(0)
2019	→ Lokomotiva Zagreb (loan)	7	(0)
2025–	Tractor	14	(0)

International career^{‡}
2010–2013	Iran U17	23	(0)
2013–2015	Iran U20	6	(1)
2017	Iran U23	2	(0)
2018–2024	Iran	30	(1)
Medal record
Representing Iran
CAFA Nations Cup
Winner	2023 Kyrgyzstan – Uzbekistan	Team
- * Club domestic league appearances and goals as of 17 April 2025 ‡ National team caps and goals as of 23 January 2024

Sadegh Moharrami Getgasari (Persian: صادق محرمی; born 1 March 1996) is an Iranian professional footballer who plays as a right-back for Persian Gulf Pro League club Tractor and the Iran national team.

== Club career ==
=== Malavan ===
Moharrami was born in Talysh family in Hashtpar, Talesh County and he started his career at youth level with Malavan. He was promoted to the first team by Dragan Skočić and made his debut for Malavan in the 2013–14 Iran Pro League against Sepahan as a substitute.

=== Persepolis ===
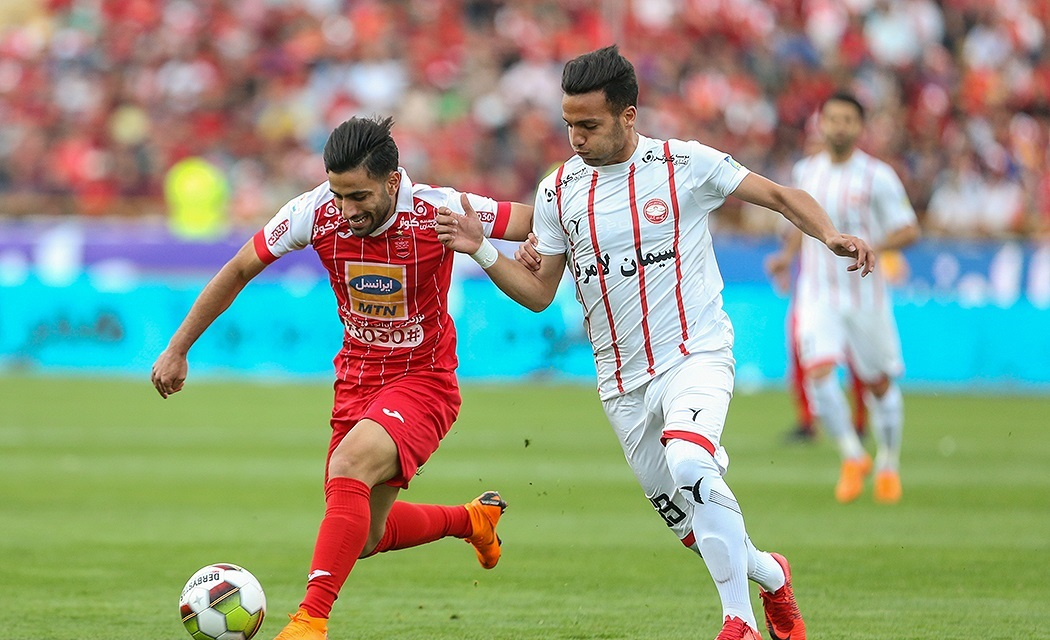
Sadegh Moharrami playing for Persepolis.

On 27 June 2016, Moharrami joined Iranian giants Persepolis on a two-year contract. He made his debut on 21 September 2016 in a 3–1 victory against Sepahan.

=== Dinamo Zagreb ===
On 27 June 2018, Moharrami signed a five-year contract with Croatian champions Dinamo Zagreb. He scored his first goal in the Croatian football league against HNK Rijeka in May 2023. that GNK Dinamo won 2:1. Moharrami made 143 appearances for GNK Dinamo Zagreb and scored 1 goal with 9 assists in 7 years.

== International career ==
=== Youth ===
He was part of the Iran U-17 squad in the 2012 AFC U-16 Championship and the 2013 FIFA U-17 World Cup.

He was invited into the Iran U-20 squad by Ali Dousti Mehr to prepare for 2014 AFC U-19 Championship.

=== Senior ===
He made his debut as a substitute against Uzbekistan on 11 September 2018.

== Career statistics ==
=== Club ===
As of match played 17 April 2025

Appearances and goals by club, season and competition
Club	Season	League			National cup (Note: Includes Iranian Hazfi Cup, Croatian Football Cup)		Continental		Other		Total	
Club	Season	Division	Apps	Goals	Apps	Goals	Apps	Goals	Apps	Goals	Apps	Goals
Malavan	2012–13	Persian Gulf Pro League	0	0	0	0	—		—		0	0
Malavan	2013–14	Persian Gulf Pro League	1	0	0	0	—		—		1	0
Malavan	2014–15	Persian Gulf Pro League	15	0	0	0	—		—		15	0
Malavan	2015–16	Persian Gulf Pro League	20	0	1	0	—		—		21	0
Malavan	Total		36	0	1	0	—		—		37	0
Persepolis	2016–17	Persian Gulf Pro League	20	0	1	0	10 (Note: Appearances in AFC Champions League)	0	—		31	0
Persepolis	2017–18	Persian Gulf Pro League	23	0	2	0	7	0	—		32	0
Persepolis	Total		43	0	3	0	17	0	—		63	0
Dinamo Zagreb	2018–19	Prva HNL	19	0	2	0	1 (Note: Appearance in UEFA Europa League)	0	—		22	0
Dinamo Zagreb	2019–20	Prva HNL	9	0	0	0	0	0	—		9	0
Dinamo Zagreb	2020–21	Prva HNL	12	0	1	0	6 (Note: One appearance in UEFA Champions League, five appearances in UEFA Europa League)	0	—		19	0
Dinamo Zagreb	2021–22	Prva HNL	10	0	3	0	6	0	—		19	0
Dinamo Zagreb	2022–23	Prva HNL	25	1	2	0	10 (Note: Appearances in UEFA Champions League)	0	1 (Note: Appearance in Croatian Football Super Cup)	0	37	1
Dinamo Zagreb	2023–24	Prva HNL	13	0	1	0	12 (Note: Four appearances in UEFA Champions League, six appearances in UEFA Europa League, two appearances in UEFA Europa Conference League)	0	1	0	26	0
Dinamo Zagreb	2024–25	Prva HNL	8	0	1	0	0	0	—		9	0
Dinamo Zagreb	Total		96	1	10	0	35	0	2	0	143	1
Dinamo Zagreb II	2018–19	Druga HNL	1	0	0	0	—		—		1	0
Lokomotiva Zagreb (loan)	2019–20	Prva HNL	7	0	3	0	—		—		10	0
Career total			183	1	17	0	52	0	2	0	254	1

=== International ===
As of match played 23 January 2024

Appearances and goals by national team and year
National team	Year	Apps	Goals
Iran	2018	4	0
Iran	2020	2	0
Iran	2021	9	0
Iran	2022	8	0
Iran	2023	4	1
Iran	2024	3	0
Total		30	1

Scores and results list Iran's goal tally first, score column indicates score after each Moharrami goal.

List of international goals scored by Sadegh Moharrami
No.	Date	Venue	Opponent	Score	Result	Competition
1	12 September 2023	Azadi Stadium, Tehran, Iran	Angola	3–0	4–0	Friendly

== Honours ==
Persepolis

- Persian Gulf Pro League: 2016–17, 2017–18
- Iranian Super Cup: 2017

Dinamo Zagreb

- Prva HNL: 2018–19, 2019–20, 2020–21, 2021–22, 2022–23, 2023–24
- Croatian Cup: 2020–21, 2023–24
- Croatian Super Cup: 2019, 2022

Tractor

- Iranian Super Cup: 2025

Iran

- CAFA Nations Cup: 2023

Individual

- Persian Gulf Pro League Team of the Year: 2017–18
