= Godwin Mensha =

Nigerian professional footballer (born 1989)

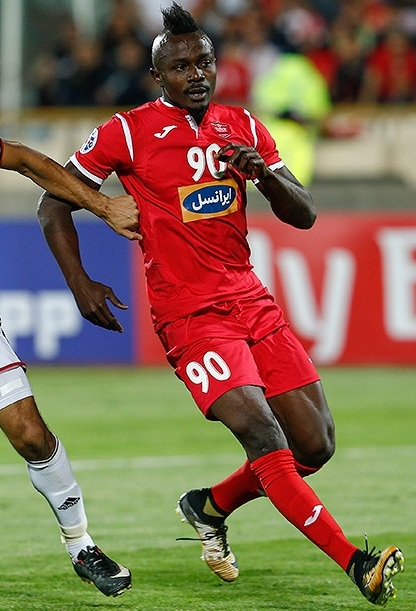
- Mensha in 2018

Personal information
- Date of birth: 2 September 1989 (age 37)
- Place of birth: Lagos, Nigeria
- Height: 1.82 m (6 ft 0 in)
- Position: Forward

Senior career*
Years	Team	Apps	(Gls)
2008–2009	Pedroñeras	18	(6)
2010–2011	Madridejos	31	(20)
2011–2012	Talavera de la Reina	26	(17)
2012–2014	Socuéllamos	71	(41)
2014–2015	Compostela	29	(4)
2015–2016	Balzan	15	(3)
2016	Mosta	16	(10)
2016–2017	Paykan	26	(15)
2017–2019	Persepolis	42	(5)
2019	Esteghlal	13	(1)
2019	Ajman	1	(0)
2020–2021	Gol Gohar	42	(16)
2021–2023	Mes Rafsanjan	48	(17)
2023–2024	Foolad	13	(1)
- * Club domestic league appearances and goals as of 22 February 2024

Godwin Mensha (born 2 September 1989) is a Nigerian professional footballer who plays as a forward for Foolad.

== Club career ==
=== Malta ===
On 30 June 2000, Mensha joined Maltese Premier League side Balzan. However in the next January, his contract was terminated and he moved to fellow league team Mosta.

=== Paykan ===
On 27 July 2016, Mensha signed for Iranian club Paykan on a one-year contract. On 7 August, he made his debut in a 3–1 defeat against Tractor Sazi. On 20 September, Coming on as a substitute, he scored his first goals for Paykan, a brace in a 3–2 away win over defending champions Esteghlal Khuzestan. With 15 league goals, Mensha was the third highest scorer in the Premier League for the 2016–17 season, three goals behind Golden Boot winner Mehdi Taremi.

=== Persepolis ===
In May 2017, Mensha signed a contract with Pro League champions Persepolis. Mensha scored his first goal for the club on 3 August 2017, in a 2–1 victory against Tractor Sazi. On 22 August 2017, Mensha scored a crucial equalizer in Persepolis' 2–2 draw against Al Ahli in the first leg of the quarter-finals of the 2017 AFC Champions League. He scored his second goal for Persepolis from the penalty spot in an away match against Al Ahli.

Mensha scored seven goals in the AFC Champions League for Persepolis, making him fourth highest goalscorer for Persepolis in Asian competitions.

=== Esteghlal ===
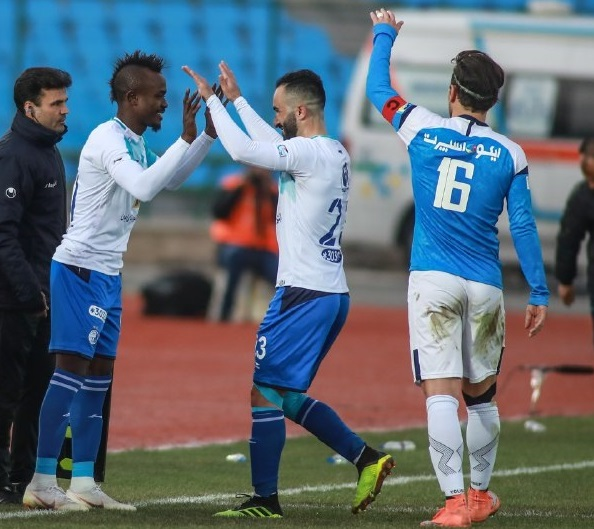
Mensha in his first game for Esteghlal against Paykan

In January 2019, Mensha and Persepolis came to a mutual agreement to terminate his contract with the club. He was then signed by cross-town rivals Esteghlal on an 18-month-long on 5 February 2019, making him the twentieth player to play for both clubs. After signing with the club, Mensha said: "I want to prove that I'm not wrong about joining Esteghlal." He was given the number 90 shirt, just as he was at Persepolis.

Mensha made his debut for the club on 7 February, in a 4–0 win against Paykan, as a 72nd-minute substitute for Dariush Shojaeian, assisting the third goal by Esmaël Gonçalves. On 28 February, in an away match against Foolad, he attacked an opponent fan after the fan pulled his hair while he was entering the stadium. During the match, he scored his first goal for his new club as well as providing an assist for the winner in the 3–1 away victory against Foolad. His goal came from Farshid Bagheri's pass from behind the halfway line, which he volleyed the ball past the keeper. Two days later, he was banned from all domestic football activities until further notice, due to the incident he had before the match. However, the ban was lifted a few days later after clarifying the incident for the FFIRI. On 5 May, with the arrival of new coach Farhad Majidi, he was excluded from training with the first-team due to his bad behaviour after he realised he is not a starter in the previous game against Padideh.

=== Ajman ===
On 11 July 2019, Mensha signed with UAE team Ajman on a two-year contract.

=== Gol Gohar ===
On 29 January 2020, Mensha returned to Iran signing with Gol Gohar Sirjan. He made his debut for the club on 1 February, coming on as a substitute for Mehrdad Bayrami in the 58th minute of a 1–1 draw against Pars Jonoubi Jam. Six days later he scored his first goal for the club in the 1–1 draw against Tractor.

== Honours ==
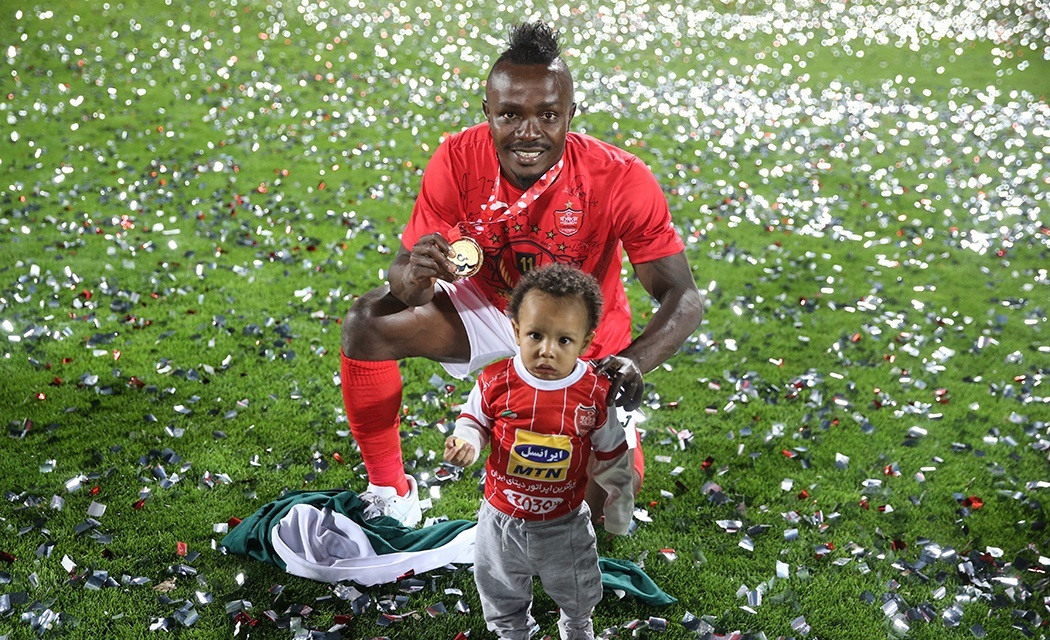
Mensha celebrates championship with Persepolis.

Persepolis

- Persian Gulf Pro League: 2017–18
- Iranian Super Cup: 2017, 2018
- AFC Champions League runner-up: 2018

Individual

- AFC Champions League Player of the Week: 2017 semi-finals 2nd leg.
- Persian Gulf Pro League top scorer: 2021–22
