= Shojae Khalilzadeh =

Iranian footballer (born 1989)

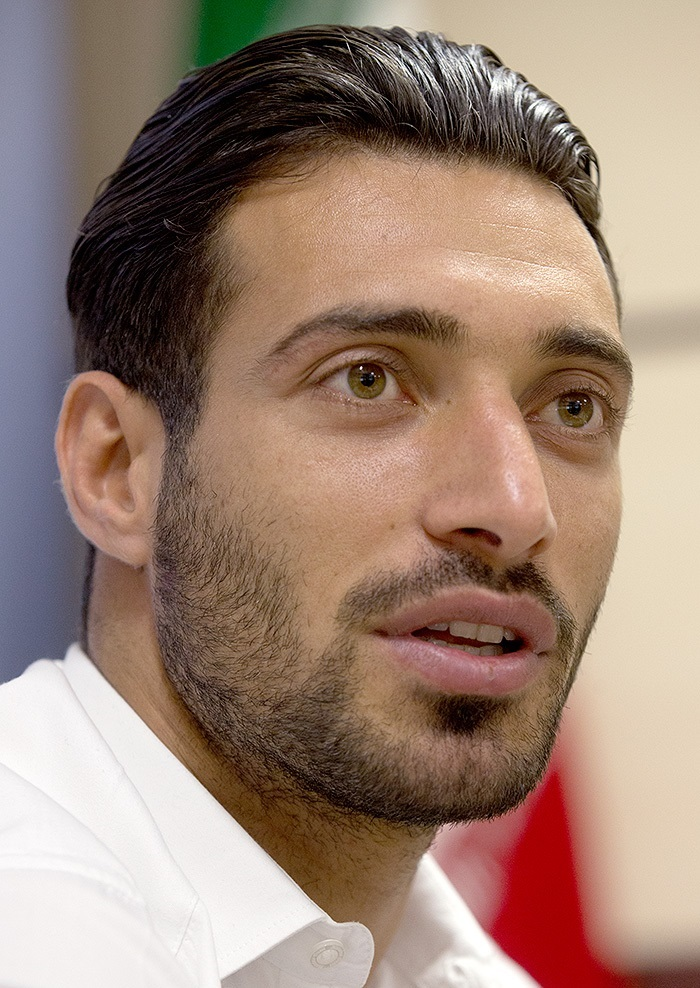
- Khalilzadeh in 2018

Personal information
- Full name: Shojae Khalilzadeh
- Date of birth: 14 May 1989 (age 37)
- Place of birth: Bahnemir, Mazandaran, Iran
- Height: 1.82 m (6 ft 0 in)
- Position: Centre-back

Team information
- Current team: Tractor
- Number: 3

Youth career
- 2005–2007: Shahrdari Amirkola
- 2007–2008: Khoshnoush Sari

Senior career*
Years	Team	Apps	(Gls)
2008–2010	Mes Rafsanjan	0	(0)
2010–2013	Mes Kerman	74	(1)
2013–2017	Sepahan	58	(1)
2015–2016	→ Tractor (loan)	23	(2)
2017–2020	Persepolis	76	(6)
2020–2022	Al-Rayyan	34	(4)
2022–2023	Al Ahli	18	(0)
2023–	Tractor	75	(3)

International career^{‡}
2007–2009	Iran U20		
2009–2011	Iran U23	5	(0)
2009–	Iran	63	(2)
- * Club domestic league appearances and goals as of 26 February 2026 ‡ National team caps and goals as of 29 September 2026

Shojae Khalilzadeh (Persian: شجاع خلیل‌زاده; born 14 May 1989) is an Iranian professional footballer who plays as a centre-back for Persian Gulf Pro League club Tractor and Iran national team. He is known for his pace, artistic tackles and positional sense.

Khalilzadeh starting his career in Kerman where he moved to two clubs, first joining Mes Rafsanjan and then signing with Mes Kerman in 2010. His performance earned him a transfer to Sepahan Isfahan in 2013 and spent four years with Talaei Pooshan, which included a successful loan spell with Tractor in Tabriz to complete his mandatory military service in IRGC. In May 2017, Khalilzadeh joined Persepolis side that he helped turn into one of the strongest on the continent, before joining Qatari side Al-Rayyan in October 2020.

== Club career ==
=== Early years in Mazandaran ===
At the age of 16, Khalilzadeh started playing football with local youth teams for three years.

=== Mes Rafsanjan and Kerman ===
Khalilzadeh began his professional career with Mes Rafsanjan in 2008. He spent two seasons at Mes Rafsanjan in Azadegan League. In late June 2010, Khalilzadeh joined Iran Pro League side Mes Kerman. He made a debut for the club under coach Samad Marfavi in the league 2010–11 season. In his second season, under Croatian coach Miroslav Blažević, he reached with the team the semi-finals of the 2011–12 Hazfi Cup. In June 2012, Khalilzadeh extended his contract for a third season a worth R800m. His performance did not go unnoticed, as Esteghlal, Persepolis and Sepahan teams showed interest in signing of the defender.

=== Sepahan and Tractor ===
In late June 2013, Khalilzadeh was presented as a player of Isfahani club Sepahan on a four-year contract. In his first season, under Croatian coach Zlatko Kranjčar, he formed a partnership in the heart of the Sepahan defensive with the captain Hadi Aghily. He helped the team to win the 2014–15 Persian Gulf Pro League.

Khalilzadeh was loaned to Tractor to complete his mandatory military service, as the club was affiliated with the provincial army of the IRGC at that time. He was one of the best players under coach Amir Ghalenoei, the club reached the top of their group at the 2016 AFC Champions League, outperforming the Saudi giant Al-Hilal. He returned to Sepahan at the end of the loan spell in July 2016.

Sepahan coach Abdollah Veisi talking about efforts to move Khalilzadeh to Persepolis in the 2016–17 season.

"As long as Shojae is in our team, even if [Gerard Piqué] comes to our team, I will play Shojae. I advise Persepolis not to follow Shojae, because if he is with a stick, I will send him to the field."

=== Persepolis ===
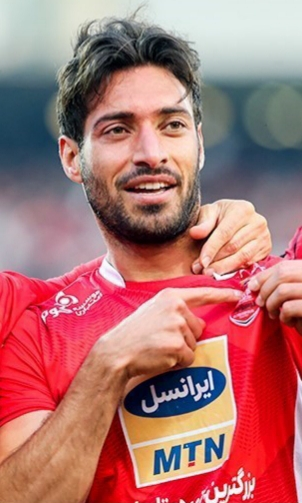
Khalilzadeh celebrates scoring for the Reds, 2018

On 6 May 2017, it was confirmed that Khalilzadeh would join the Persian Gulf Pro League champions Persepolis on a two-year contract to play under Croatian coach Branko Ivanković. In his debut match in the league, he scored his first goal against Foolad Khuzestan. He scored his second goal for Persepolis in the 2017 AFC Champions League quarter-finals match against Al Ahli. Persepolis reached the semi-final for the first time in its history before FIFA imposed sanctions on the team's top scorer and the club. In his first season with the red half of Tehran, Persepolis, Khalilzadeh played 41 games and scored five goals.

The following year was the most successful in Persepolis history against all odds, the Reds finished runner-up in the 2018 AFC Champions League. Khalilzadeh was selected in two squads "Team of the Season" for his performance in the tournament.

Persepolis was scoreless with Al Ahli on Matchday Three 2019 AFC Champions League, when Khalilzadeh showed superb agility to adjust his body and acrobatically bicycle kick home the opening goal, which was named as the best goal of the 2019 AFC Champions League by the fans. He scored two goals in the competition but his team were eliminated of the group stage.

"During these years, I never neglected Persepolis, which has always been my love, and despite numerous injuries, I entered the field with all my strength, so that I could repay a part of love to the fans."

— Khalilzadeh Speaking to the fans after his move, October 2020.

In the 2020 AFC Champions League, the last tournament before increasing the number of clubs to 40 teams, Khalilzadeh's goal in the final minutes of the Al Taawoun match was a leap for the team after a faltering start in the tournament. In the Round of 16 against Al-Sadd, the role and interventions of Khalilzadeh in the game were more influential, before Persepolis scored the winning goal in the 89th minute. He was also "Player of the Week" at the AFC Champions League semi-final following his performance in his last match with the team against Al Nassr and help Persepolis to reach the final, where the east champion was determined on 13 December.

Khalilzadeh played a great role in winning three titles in the Iran Pro League and helped Persepolis to reach AFC Champions League final twice in three years. Since 2018, Khalilzadeh has been linked with a move to the Qatar Stars League and the Chinese Super League. At the age of 31, before the start of the 2020–21 season, after not reaching an agreement to renew his contract, he moved to Qatar. Khalilzadeh was reportedly chosen as one of the candidates for the 2020 Asian Footballer of the Year award before the award was confirmed to be cancelled in late December.

=== Al-Rayyan ===
On 25 October 2020, Al-Rayyan announced on the last day of the summer transfer window the signing of Khalilzadeh on a two-year contract a worth $700,000. It was his first career stop outside of his home country and became the second Iranian to play for Al-Rayyan since 1980s, after his former coach Ghasempour. Under the coach Aguirre, he played a central defender, and Mercado moved to the right-back in the following games. He scored his first goal with a side volley shot in a 2–1 victory against Qatar SC on 12 January 2021. The following week, Khalilzadeh scored his second goal with a counter-attack in a 3–0 win against Al-Wakrah. As a defender and deep-lying playmaker behind the midfield, he played 26 games and scored three goals. Al-Rayyan finished third in the league. In late October 2021, Khalilzadeh extended his contract with the club until 2023.

Return to Tractor and Captaincy (2023-present)

On June 30, 2023, following brief spells in the Qatar Stars League with Al-Rayyan and Al-Ahli Doha, Khalilzadeh returned to the Persian Gulf Pro League, re-signing with Tractor on a multi-year deal.

Upon his return, Khalilzadeh was appointed club captain. He re-established himself as an anchor in the heart of Tractor's defense, taking on leadership duties both domestically in the Persian Gulf Pro League and on the continental stage in the AFC Champions League competition. During his second stint, he helped guide the club through back-to-back continental campaigns, including the AFC Champions League Two (2024–25) and the AFC Champions League Elite (2025–26 and 2026–27)

== International Career ==
nvited to Iran national team in 2012 by Carlos Queiroz. He made his debut for the Team Melli in a 6–1 victory against Tajikistan national team.

After seven years of notable absence from the international side, during the time of Queiroz and Marc Wilmots, Khalilzadeh was call-up by new coach Dragan Skočić in 2020 for a friendlies against Uzbekistan and Bosnia and Herzegovina, and to help in a difficult situation, after the failure in the 2019 AFC Asian Cup and two consecutive defeats from Bahrain and Iraq in the second round of qualifiers for the 2022 FIFA World Cup. The Team Melli finished top of the group stage, where they won all of his remaining four matches to qualify to 2023 AFC Asian Cup and the final round of the World Cup.

On 1 June 2026, he was named in the 26-man squad for the 2026 FIFA World Cup.

== Style of play ==
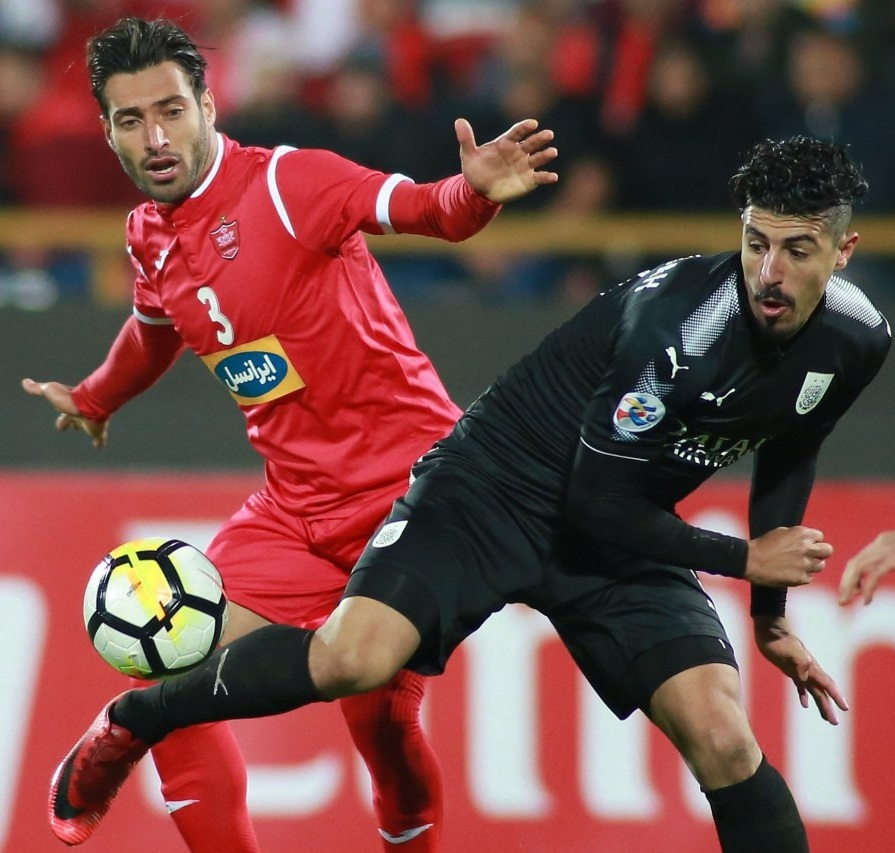
Khalilzadeh with a striker Baghdad Bounedjah during a 2018 ACL.

He is known for his awareness, carrying the ball forward and his on-the-pitch bravery.

== Personal life ==
Khalilzadeh was born in the small village of Gālesh Kolā in Bahnemir District, Babolsar County, Mazandaran Province, to a family working in agriculture and fish farming on the Caspian Sea.

== Career statistics ==
=== Club ===
As of 14 April 2026

Appearances and goals by club, season and competition
Club	Season	League			Cup (Note: Includes Hazfi Cup and Emir Cup.)		Asia		Other (Note: Includes Super Cup, Qatar Cup and Qatari Stars Cup.)		Total	
Club	Season	Division	Apps	Goals	Apps	Goals	Apps	Goals	Apps	Goals	Apps	Goals
Mes Rafsanjan	2008–09	Division 1	0	0	4	0	—		—		4	0
Mes Rafsanjan	2009–10	Division 1	0	0	3	0	—		—		3	0
Mes Rafsanjan	Total		0	0	7	0	—		—		7	0
Mes Kerman	2010–11	Persian Gulf Pro League	22	0	1	0	—		—		23	0
Mes Kerman	2011–12	Persian Gulf Pro League	27	2	1	0	—		—		28	2
Mes Kerman	2012–13	Persian Gulf Pro League	25	0	0	0	—		—		25	0
Mes Kerman	Total		74	2	2	0	—		—		76	2
Sepahan	2013–14	Persian Gulf Pro League	26	0	1	0	6	0	—		33	0
Sepahan	2014–15	Persian Gulf Pro League	9	1	0	0	—		—		9	1
Sepahan	2016–17	Persian Gulf Pro League	23	0	3	0	—		—		26	0
Sepahan	Total		58	1	4	0	6	1	—		68	1
Persepolis	2017–18	Persian Gulf Pro League	26	3	3	1	17	1	1	0	47	5
Persepolis	2018–19	Persian Gulf Pro League	27	2	4	0	5	2	—		36	4
Persepolis	2019–20	Persian Gulf Pro League	22	1	3	0	9	2	—		34	3
Persepolis	Total		75	6	10	1	31	5	1	0	117	12
Al-Rayyan	2020–21	Qatar Stars League	13	2	1	0	6	1	2	0	22	3
Al-Rayyan	2021–22	Qatar Stars League	21	2	0	0	0	0	6	0	27	2
Al-Rayyan	Total		34	4	1	0	6	1	8	0	49	5
Al Ahli	2022–23	Qatar Stars League	18	0	3	0	0	0	1	0	22	0
Tractor	2015–16	Persian Gulf Pro League	23	2	3	0	7	1	—		33	3
Tractor	2023–24	Persian Gulf Pro League	26	2	2	0	1	0	0	0	29	2
Tractor	2024–25	Persian Gulf Pro League	28	1	1	0	7	0	0	0	36	1
Tractor	2025–26	Persian Gulf Pro League	21	0	1	0	9	1	1	0	32	1
Tractor	2026-27	Persian Gulf Pro League	7	0	0	0	0	0	—		7	0
Tractor	Total Tractor		105	5	7	0	24	2	1	0	137	7
Career total			364	18	34	1	67	8	11	0	476	27

=== International ===
As of 29 September 2026

Appearances and goals by national team and year
National team	Year	Apps	Goals
Iran	2009	1	0
Iran	2012	6	0
Iran	2013	1	0
Iran	2014	0	0
Iran	2020	2	0
Iran	2021	11	1
Iran	2022	4	0
Iran	2023	7	0
Iran	2024	15	1
Iran	2025	7	0
Iran	2026	9	0
Total		63	2

Scores and results list Iran's goal tally first.

List of international goals scored by Shojae Khalilzadeh
No.	Date	Venue	Opponent	Score	Result	Competition
1.	11 June 2021	Bahrain National Stadium, Riffa, Bahrain	Cambodia	2–0	10–0	2022 FIFA World Cup qualification
2.	14 January 2024	Education City Stadium, Al Rayyan, Qatar	Palestine	2–0	4–1	2023 AFC Asian Cup

== Honours ==
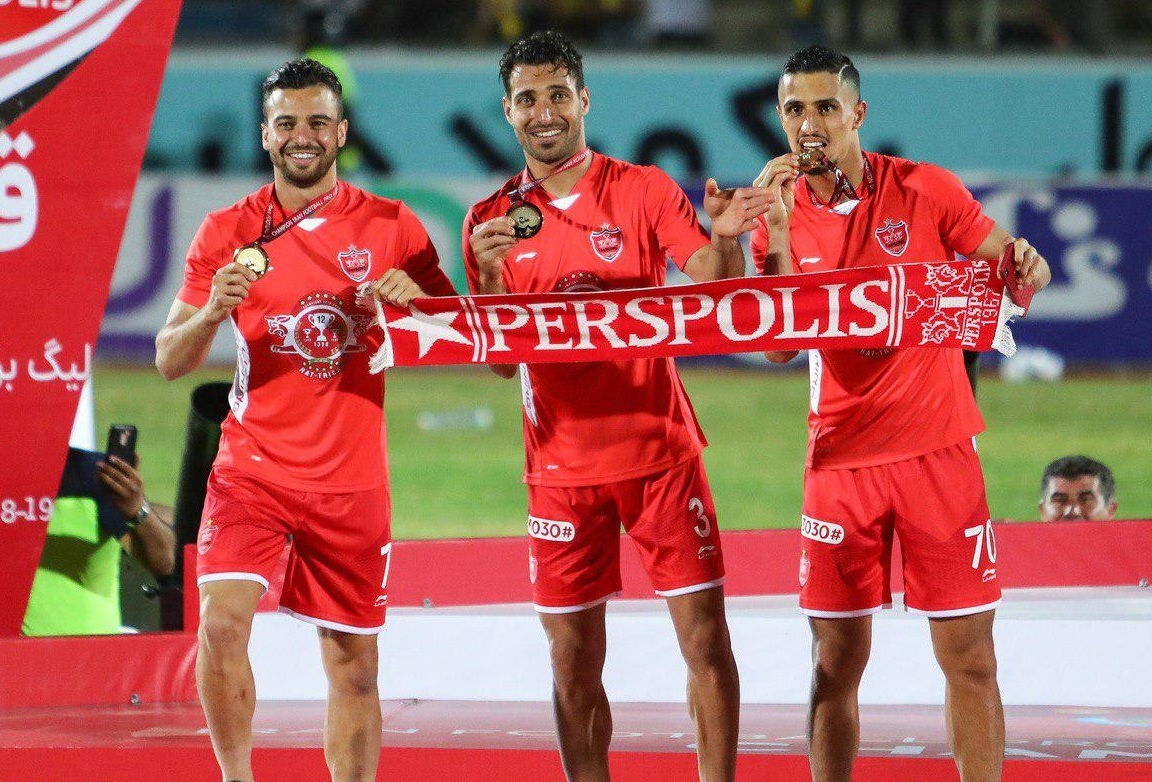
Persepolis trophy celebrations, 2018–19 Persian Gulf Pro League.

Sepahan

- Persian Gulf Pro League: 2014–15

Persepolis

- Persian Gulf Pro League (3): 2017–18, 2018–19, 2019–20
- Hazfi Cup: 2018–19
- Iranian Super Cup (3): 2017, 2018, 2019
- AFC Champions League runner-up: 2018

Tractor

- Persian Gulf Pro League: 2024–25

Individual

- AFC Champions League group stage Best Centre Defender: 2016, 2019
- AFC Champions League Best Centre Defender: 2018, 2020
- AFC Champions League Team of the Year: 2018, 2020 West
- Iran Pro League Best Centre Defender: 2018–19
- AFC Champions League Best Goal: 2019, 2020 West
- AFC Champions League OPTA Player of the Week: 2020 Semi-finals
- AFC Champions League Top Passes: 2018 (553 Passes as defender), 2020 (598 Passes)
- AFC Champions League group stage Top Long Passes: 2021 West (58 Passes)
