= Ehsan Alvanzadeh =

Iranian football forward

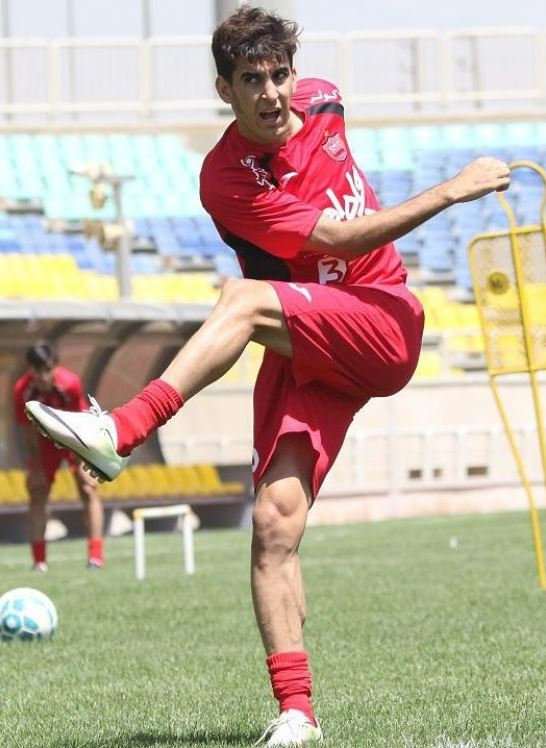

Personal information
- Full name: Ehsan Alvanzadeh
- Date of birth: April 18, 1994 (age 32)
- Place of birth: Dezful, iran
- Height: 1.75 m (5 ft 9 in)
- Position: Winger

Team information
- Current team: Fajr Sepasi (on loan from Machine Sazi)
- Number: 27

Youth career
- 2011–2012: Esteghlal Ahvaz
- 2012–2014: Esteghlal Khuzestan

Senior career*
Years	Team	Apps	(Gls)
2013–2014	Esteghlal Khuzestan	14	(9)
2014–2016	Naft Masjed Soleyman	33	(9)
2016–2019	Persepolis	13	(4)
2019–	Machine Sazi	7	(3)
2019–2022	→ Fajr Sepasi (loan)	40	(18)
2022	Esteghlal Mollasani F.C.		
- * Club domestic league appearances and goals

Ehsan Alvanzadeh (Persian: احسان علوان‌زاده; April 18, 1994) is an Iranian football forward who currently plays for Iranian football club Fajr Sepasi in the Azadegan League.

== Club career ==
Alvanzadeh was a part of Esteghlal Khuzestan U21 during 2012–14. He was promoted to first team in Summer 2013 by Abdollah Veisi. He netted in his debut match against Rah Ahan on October 17, 2013. In summer 2014 he joined Naft Masjed Soleyman with a 2-year contract.

=== FC Persepolis ===
On 7 June 2016 he joined FC Persepolis with a 3-year contract.

== Club career statistics ==
As of 31 October 2014.

Club	Division	Season	League		Hazfi Cup		Asia		Total	
Club	Division	Season	Apps	Goals	Apps	Goals	Apps	Goals	Apps	Goals
Esteghlal Kh.	Pro League	2013–14	3	1	0	0	–	–	3	1
Naft MIS	Pro League	2014–15	2	0	1	0	–	–	3	0
Naft MIS	Azadegan League	2015-16	30	0	0	0	-	-	30	0
Perspolis	Pro league	2016-17	6	0	0	0	0	0	6	0
Perspolis	Pro league	2017-18	10	0	1	0	2	0	13	0
Career Totals			51	1	2	0	2	0	55	1

== Honours ==
Persepolis

- Persian Gulf Pro League (2): 2016–17, 2017–18
- Iranian Super Cup (2): 2017, 2018
- AFC Champions League runner-up: 2018

Fajr Sepasi

- Azadegan League: 2020–21
