= Saeid Hosseinpour =

Iranian footballer

Saeed Hosseinpour
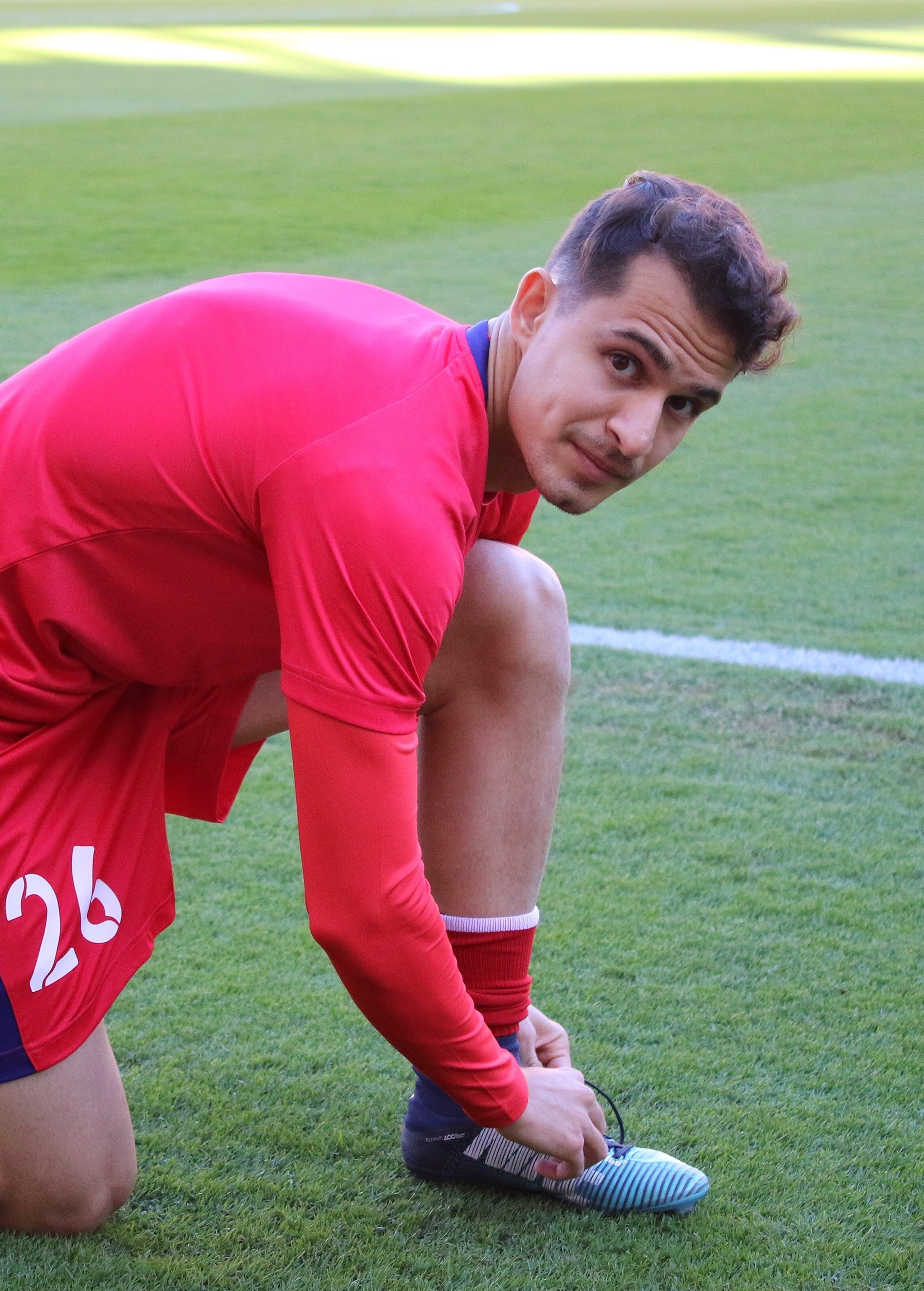
- Hosseinpour in 2018

Personal information
- Full name: Saeed Hosseinpour
- Date of birth: 12 October 1998 (age 28)
- Place of birth: Tehran, Iran
- Height: 1.77 m (5 ft 10 in)
- Position: Midfielder

Team information
- Current team: Be'sat Kermanshah
- Number: 66

Youth career
- Paykan
- Persepolis

Senior career*
Years	Team	Apps	(Gls)
2017–2021	Persepolis	11	(0)
2021	→ Machine Sazi (loan)	10	(1)
2022	Kavala	2	(0)
2022–2023	Saipa	0	(0)
2023–2024	Mes Kerman	5	(1)
2024	Damash Gilan	10	(0)
2024–2025	Palayesh Naft	9	(0)
2025–	Be'sat Kermanshah	20	(1)

International career
2017–2019	Iran U23	3	(0)
- * Club domestic league appearances and goals as of 16 April 2022

Saeed Hosseinpour (Persian: سعید حسین پور; born 12 October 1998) is an Iranian professional footballer who plays as a midfielder.

== Club career ==
=== Persepolis ===
Hosseinpour joined Persepolis in summer 2017 with a contract until 2021. He made his professional debut for Persepolis on 3 August 2018 in 3-0 Win against Foolad as a substitute for Omid Alishah.

== Career statistics ==
=== Club ===
As of 25 July 2021

Club	Division	Season	League		Hazfi Cup		Asia		Total	
Club	Division	Season	Apps	Goals	Apps	Goals	Apps	Goals	Apps	Goals
Persepolis	Pro League	2017–18	1	0	0	0	0	0	1	0
Persepolis	Pro League	2018–19	4	0	1	0	2	0	7	0
Persepolis	Pro League	2019–20	3	0	0	0	0	0	3	0
Persepolis	Pro League	2020–21	1	0	0	0	0	0	1	0
Persepolis	Total		9	0	1	0	2	0	12	0
Machine Sazi (loan)	Pro League	2020–21	12	1	1	0	—		13	1
Machine Sazi (loan)	Total		12	1	1	0	—		13	1
Career totals			21	1	2	0	2	0	25	1

== Honours ==
Persepolis

- Persian Gulf Pro League (3): 2017–18, 2018–19, 2019–20
- Iranian Super Cup (2): 2018, 2019
- Hazfi Cup (1): 2018–19
- AFC Champions League runner-up: 2018, 2020
