= Mohsen Mosalman =

Iranian former football player

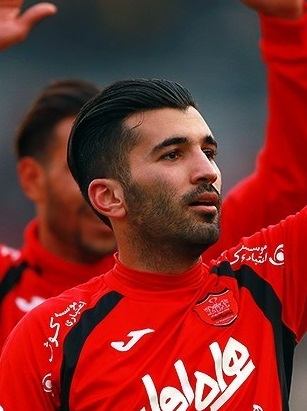
- Mosalman with Persepolis in 2017

Personal information
- Date of birth: 27 January 1991 (age 35)
- Place of birth: Tehran, Iran
- Height: 1.77 m (5 ft 9 1/2 in)
- Position: Attacking midfielder

Youth career
- 2006–2010: Zob Ahan

Senior career*
Years	Team	Apps	(Gls)
2007–2015	Zob Ahan	131	(18)
2010–2012	→ Malavan (loan)	56	(3)
2013–2014	→ Persepolis (loan)	12	(2)
2015	→ Foolad (loan)	13	(0)
2015–2018	Persepolis	72	(1)
2018	Zob Ahan	12	(3)
2019–2020	Sepahan	7	(0)
2020–2021	Saipa	14	(1)

International career^{‡}
2004–2005	Iran U15		
2007–2008	Iran U20	5	(0)
2010–2014	Iran U23	18	(0)
2011–2014	Iran	4	(1)
- * Club domestic league appearances and goals ‡ National team caps and goals as of 15 September 2014

Mohsen Mosalman (Persian: محسن مسلمان; born 27 January 1991) is a former Iranian footballer who plays as an attacking midfielder.

He was also a member of the Iran national football team and was the captain of the U-23 team. A play-making midfielder, he is known for his passing and dribbling skills on the ball. He also holds the record for being the youngest scorer in the Iran Pro League.

== Club career ==
=== Zob Ahan ===
He made his debut in the 2007–08 season in a match against Bargh Shiraz, in which he scored his first goal. This makes him the youngest player in Iran's Premier Football League when he was only 16 years old and his immense goalscoring capability. He scored another goal, against Persepolis in Azadi Stadium and became the youngest player that have scored to Persepolis.

He was one of the most promising young players in the season and continued his good performances in 2008–09 season for Zob Ahan. In 2009–10 season, he was not a starting line up player.

=== Loan to Malavan ===
In 2010–11 season, he was loaned to Malavan to end his conscription career. He was one of the starting players for Malavan in the season with his assists.

After spend two years at Malavan as loan, he returned to Zob Ahan at the end of the 2011–12 season.

=== Loan to Persepolis ===
He joined Persepolis on loan until the end of the 2013–14 season on 18 November 2013. He made his debut in a match against Tractor Sazi which Persepolis defeated 0–1. Two weeks later, he scored his first goal for Persepolis in a 6–0 away victory over Mes Kerman.

=== Loan to Foolad ===
After the end of the loan contract and his return from Persepolis to Zobahan, he was loaned to another team again. Mosalman left for Foolad on loan.

=== Persepolis ===
In the summer of 2015 Persepolis paid a fee of €80,000 to Zob Ahan and signed Mosalman on a 2–year contract. Mosalman scored his first Persepolis goal in the Tehran derby in a historic 4–2 victory against Esteghlal. He scored his first Asian goal on 21 February 2017 in a 1–1 draw against Saudi club Al Hilal in a group stage match.

=== Return to Zob Ahan ===
He rejected bids from Persepolis and Sepahan in favor of Zob Ahan stay. He joined ZOBAHAN F.C on 7 June 2018 again after leaving Perspolis.

=== Sepahan ===
In 2018, Mosalman joined Sepahan.

But he could not shine in the Isfahani team as he did during his time in Persepolis, and left Sepahan after a not so good performance.

=== Saipa ===
In 2020, he joined to the Saipa F.C.

== International career ==
=== Under-22 ===
He was called up by Ali Reza Mansourian to participate in the team's training camp in Italy. He captained the Iran national under-23 football team. He was named in the Iran U23 final list for Incheon 2014.

=== Senior ===
On 3 October 2011, he was called up to the Iran national team by Carlos Queiroz. Two days later, he made his debut for Iran against Palestine.

== Statistics ==
=== Club career statistics ===
As of 30 June 2021

Club	Season	League			Hazfi Cup		Asia		Other		Total	
Club	Season	Division	Apps	Goals	Apps	Goals	Apps	Goals	Apps	Goals	Apps	Goals
Zob Ahan	2007–08	Persian Gulf Pro League	26	5	2	0	–	–	–	–	28	5
Zob Ahan	2008–09	Persian Gulf Pro League	19	1	3	0	–	–	–	–	22	1
Zob Ahan	2009–10	Persian Gulf Pro League	25	2	4	0	6	0	–	–	35	2
Zob Ahan	2012–13	Persian Gulf Pro League	32	4	3	0	–	–	–	–	35	4
Zob Ahan	2013–14	Persian Gulf Pro League	12	1	1	0	–	–	–	–	13	1
Zob Ahan	2014–15	Persian Gulf Pro League	11	2	0	0	–	–	–	–	11	2
Zob Ahan	2018–19	Persian Gulf Pro League	12	3	1	0	0	0	–	–	13	3
Zob Ahan	Total		137	18	14	0	6	0	–	–	157	18
Malavan (loan)	2010–11	Persian Gulf Pro League	25	1	4	0	–	–	–	–	29	1
Malavan (loan)	2011–12	Persian Gulf Pro League	31	2	1	0	–	–	–	–	32	2
Malavan (loan)	Total		56	3	5	0	–	–	–	–	61	3
Persepolis	2013–14 (loan)	Persian Gulf Pro League	12	2	1	0	–	–	–	–	13	2
Persepolis	2015–16	Persian Gulf Pro League	23	1	3	0	–	–	–	–	26	1
Persepolis	2016–17	Persian Gulf Pro League	27	2	1	0	8	1	–	–	36	3
Persepolis	2017–18	Persian Gulf Pro League	21	0	1	0	5	0	1	1	28	1
Persepolis	Total		83	5	6	0	13	1	1	1	103	7
Foolad (loan)	2014–15	Persian Gulf Pro League	13	0	0	0	5	0	–	–	18	0
Foolad (loan)	Total		13	0	0	0	5	0	–	–	18	0
Sepahan	2018–19	Iran Pro League	5	0	0	0	–	–	–	–	5	0
Sepahan	2019–20	Iran Pro League	2	0	0	0	0	0	0	0	2	0
Saipa	2020–21	Iran Pro League	13	1	0	0	–	–	–	–	13	1
Career total			309	27	25	0	24	1	1	1	359	29

- Assist Goals

Season	Team	Assists
09–10	Zob Ahan	1
10–11	Malavan	2
11–12	Malavan	8
12–13	Zob Ahan	3
13–14	Zob Ahan	2
13–14	Persepolis	2
14–15	Zob Ahan	2
15–16	Persepolis	4
16–17	Persepolis	9
17–18	Persepolis	10
18–19	Zob Ahan	0
20–21	Saipa	1

=== International goals ===
Scores and results list Iran's goal tally first.

#	Date	Venue	Opponent	Score	Result	Competition
1	22 May 2013	Sultan Qaboos Sports Complex, Muscat, Oman	Oman	1–3	1–3	Friendly

== Honours ==
Zob Ahan

- Persian Gulf Pro League Runner-up (2): 2008–09, 2009–10
- Hazfi Cup (1): 2008–09
- AFC Champions League Runner-up (1): 2010

Persepolis

- Persian Gulf Pro League (2): 2016–17, 2017–18; Runner-up (2): 2013–14, 2015–16
- Iranian Super Cup (1): 2017
- AFC Champions League Runner-up (1): 2018

Sephan

- Persian Gulf Pro League Runner-up (1): 2018–19

=== Individual ===
- Persian Gulf Pro League Top Assists: 2017–18
