= Arash Shahamati =

Iranian footballer

Personal information
- Full name: Arash Shahamatinejad
- Date of birth: 18 March 1998 (age 28)
- Place of birth: Ardabil, Iran
- Height: 1.68 m (5 ft 6 in)
- Position: Defender

Team information
- Current team: Chooka Talesh

Youth career
- 2011–2014: Shahrdari Ardabil
- 2014–2015: Moghavemat Tehran
- 2015–2016: Frenz United
- 2016–2018: Naft Tehran
- 2018–2019: Esteghlal

Senior career*
Years	Team	Apps	(Gls)
2017–2018	Naft Tehran	2	(0)
2018–2019	Esteghlal	0	(0)
2020-	Chooka Talesh	4	(0)

International career
2011–2013	Iran U15		
- * Club domestic league appearances and goals as of 21:16, 7 October 2018 (UTC)

Arash Shahamati (Persian: آرش شهامتی; born 18 March 1998) is an Iranian footballer who plays as a defender for Persian Gulf Pro League club Zob Ahan.
