= Hamidreza Taherkhani =

Iranian footballer

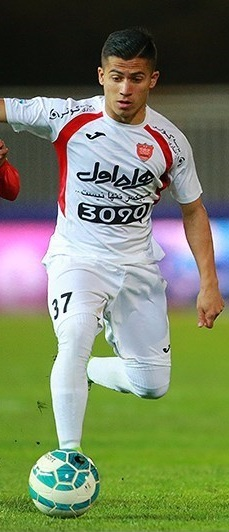

Personal information
- Date of birth: 25 March 1999 (age 27)
- Place of birth: Takestan, Iran
- Height: 1.63 m (5 ft 4 in)
- Position: Attacking midfielder

Team information
- Current team: Kheybar Khorramabad
- Number: 7

Youth career
- –2013: Arad Takestan
- 2013–2015: Persepolis
- 2015–2016: Rah Ahan
- 2016–2018: Persepolis

Senior career*
Years	Team	Apps	(Gls)
2015–2016	Rah Ahan	1	(0)
2016–2020	Persepolis	12	(0)
2019	→ Sepidrood (loan)	5	(0)
2020–2021	Shahrdari Bandar Abbas	11	(1)
2021–2022	Juventud Torremolinos	0	(0)
2022–2023	Omid Vahdat		
2023–2025	Kheybar Khorramabad	51	(14)
2025	Zob Ahan	7	(0)
2025–2026	Kheybar Khorramabad	7	(0)
2026	Mes Rafsanjan	5	(0)
2026–	Kheybar Khorramabad	7	(0)

International career
2017–2019	Iran U23	6	(0)
- * Club domestic league appearances and goals as of 7 March 2025

Hamidreza Taherkhani (Persian: حمیدرضا طاهرخانی; born 26 March 1999) is an Iranian footballer who plays as a forward for Kheybar Khorramabad.

== Club career ==
=== Early years ===
Taherkhani started his career with Arad Takestan from youth levels. In 2014, he joined to Persepolis Academy and played for U16 side. He finished 2014–15 season in 2nd place of top scores of Tehran U16 Asia Vision Premier League. He also chosen as the best U16 player of Persepolis Academy in this season.

=== Rah Ahan ===
Taherkhani joined Rah Ahan in summer 2015 with a contract until 2018. He made his professional debut for Rah Ahan on 13 December 2015 in 0–0 draw against Sepahan as a substitute for Mehrdad Mohammadi.

== Honours ==
Persepolis

- Persian Gulf Pro League (2): 2016–17, 2017–18
- Iranian Super Cup (3): 2017, 2018, 2019
- AFC Champions League runner-up: 2018
