= Mohsen Rabikhah =

Iranian footballer (born 1987)

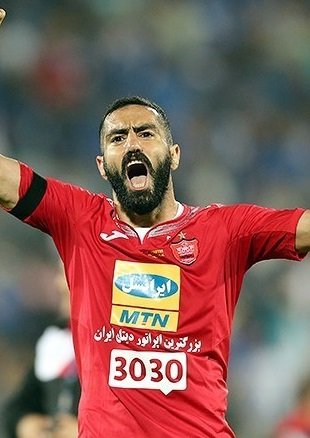

Personal information
- Full name: Mohsen Rabikhah Nodehi
- Date of birth: 24 December 1987 (age 38)
- Place of birth: Tehran, Iran
- Height: 1.79 m (5 ft 10 1/2 in)
- Position: Defensive midfielder

Senior career*
Years	Team	Apps	(Gls)
2008–2009	Mehrkam Pars	6	(0)
2009–2013	Pas	60	(8)
2013–2014	Tractor	19	(1)
2014–2016	Sanat Naft Abadan	51	(7)
2016–2020	Persepolis	76	(0)
2020–2021	Aluminium Arak	5	(0)
2021–2022	Shahr Khodro	11	(0)
2022–2023	Darya Babol	19	(0)
- * Club domestic league appearances and goals

Mohsen Rabikhah (Persian: محسن ربیع‌خواه; born 24 December 1987) is an Iranian former football defensive midfielder.

== Club career ==
Rabikhah made his professional debut with Pas Hamedan in the Persian Gulf Pro League. He signed with Tractor in 2013, after an unsuccessful season with Tractor, Rabiekhah left for Azadegan League side Sanat Naft Abadan. After two good seasons with Sanat, Rabiekhah signed Persepolis.

In 2017 Rabikhah was named man of the match by the Persian League for defending an aggressive attack by Saudi Arabia's Al Ahli team.

Rabikhah suffered a torn anterior cruciate ligament in his left knee in the match against Pars Jonoubi, sidelined for six months. In an interview with the official media of Persepolis Club, Dr. Alireza Haghighat stated about the latest condition of the team midfielder: Mohsen Rabikhah felt discomfort in the sole of his foot and was sent for further examinations to have an MRI.

He continued: "In response to detailed tests, it was determined that a bone in the sole of Rabikhah's foot was broken, and thus this player will be out of action for three to four weeks." He will train under the supervision of the medical staff and we will try to get him back to group training as soon as possible.

Mohsen Rabiekhah was not noticed by the head coach of Persepolis after his injury and left the team and joined Arak Aluminum.Rabikhah injured from the foot (thin leg) in dealing with the opposing player in the 4th minute of the Arak Aluminum team's match against Peykan, and according to the team's medical team, he could not accompany the team until further notice.

== Club career statistics ==
As of 12 December 2020

Club	Division	Season	League		Hazfi Cup		Asia		Total	
Club	Division	Season	Apps	Goals	Apps	Goals	Apps	Goals	Apps	Goals
Mehrkam Pars	Division 1	2008–09	6	0	0	0	—		6	0
Pas	Pro League	2009–10	0	0	1	0	—		1	0
Pas	Pro League	2010–11	12	2	1	0	—		13	2
Pas	Division 1	2011–12	23	2	2	0	—		25	2
Pas	Division 1	2012–13	25	4	1	0	—		26	4
Total			66	8	5	0	—		71	8
Tractor	Pro League	2013–14	19	1	2	0	1	0	22	1
Sanat Naft	Division 1	2014–15	24	2	1	0	—		25	2
Sanat Naft	Division 1	2015–16	27	5	2	0	—		29	5
Total			70	8	5	0	1	0	76	8
Persepolis	Pro League	2016–17	20	0	1	0	2	0	23	0
Persepolis	Pro League	2017–18	24	0	3	0	7	0	34	0
Persepolis	Pro League	2018–19	16	0	1	0	3	0	20	0
Persepolis	Pro League	2019–20	16	0	2	0	1	0	19	0
Persepolis	Total		76	0	7	0	13	0	96	0
Aluminium Arak	Pro League	2020–21	5	0	0	0	—		5	0
Aluminium Arak	Total		5	0	0	0	—		5	0
Career Totals			217	16	17	0	14	0	248	16

== Honours ==
Persepolis

- Persian Gulf Pro League (4): 2016–17, 2017–18, 2018–19, 2019–20
- Iranian Super Cup (3): 2017, 2018, 2019
- Hazfi Cup (1): 2018–19
- AFC Champions League runner-up: 2018
