= Hossein Mahini =

Iranian footballer (born 1986)

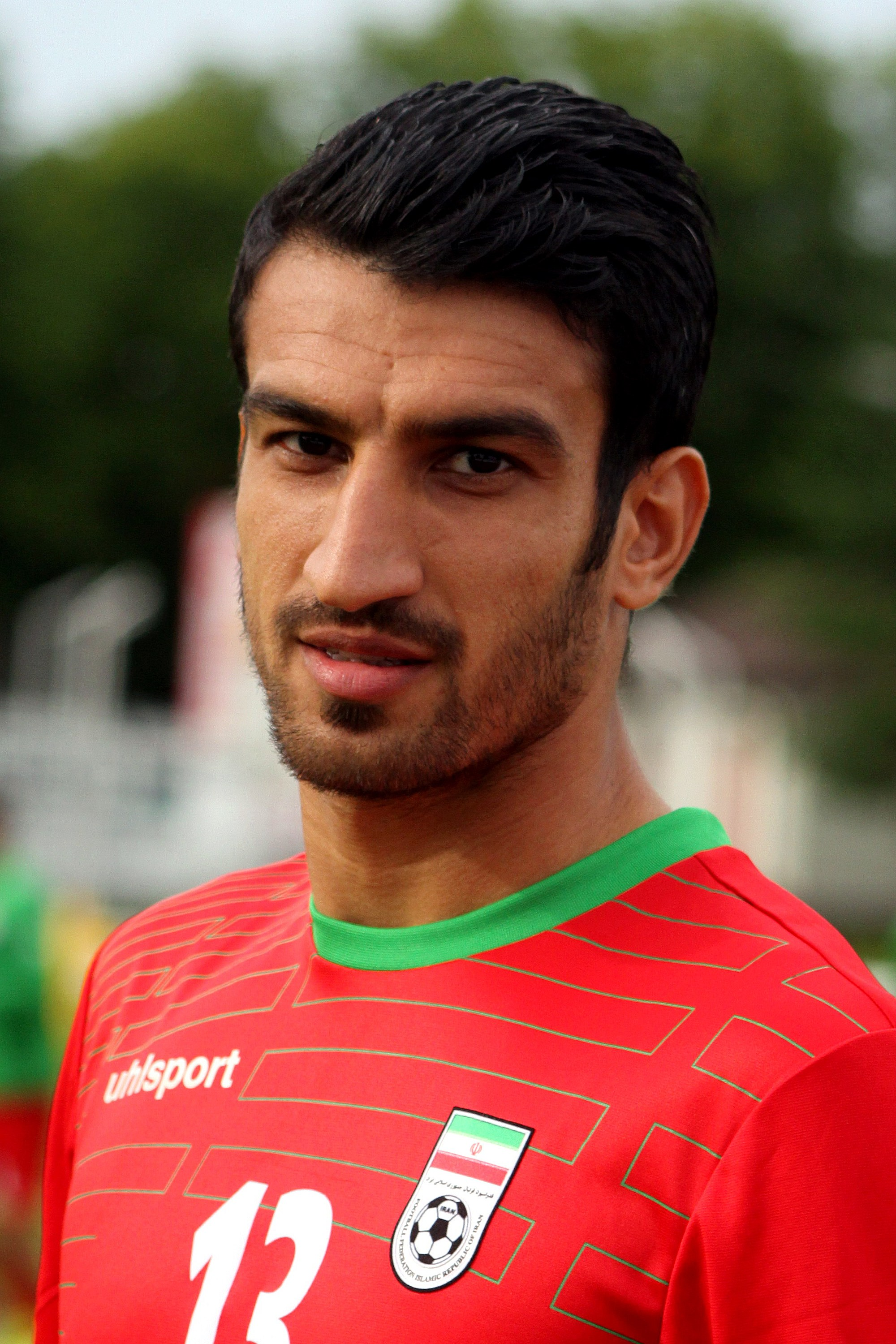

Personal information
- Full name: Hossein Mahini
- Date of birth: 16 September 1986 (age 40)
- Place of birth: Bushehr, Iran
- Height: 1.82 m (5 ft 11 1/2 in)
- Positions: Full back; defensive midfielder

Team information
- Current team: Persepolis B (assistant)

Youth career
- 2001–2005: Iranjavan
- 2005–2006: Esteghlal Ahvaz

Senior career*
Years	Team	Apps	(Gls)
2005–2010	Esteghlal Ahvaz	95	(3)
2010–2012	Zob Ahan	61	(3)
2012–2020	Persepolis	127	(2)
2015–2016	→ Malavan (loan)	20	(1)
2020	Nassaji	13	(0)
2020–2022	Saipa	30	(1)

International career^{‡}
2006–2008	Iran U23	12	(0)
2011–2017	Iran	23	(0)

Managerial career
- 2026–: Persepolis B (assistant)
Medal record
Representing Iran
Men's Football
Asian Games
Bronze medal – third place	2006 Qatar	Team competition
- * Club domestic league appearances and goals as of 4 October 2019 ‡ National team caps and goals as of 10 June 2018

Hossein Mahini (Persian: حسین ماهینی; born September 16, 1986) is an Iranian former footballer who played as a defender.

== Club career ==
=== Persepolis ===
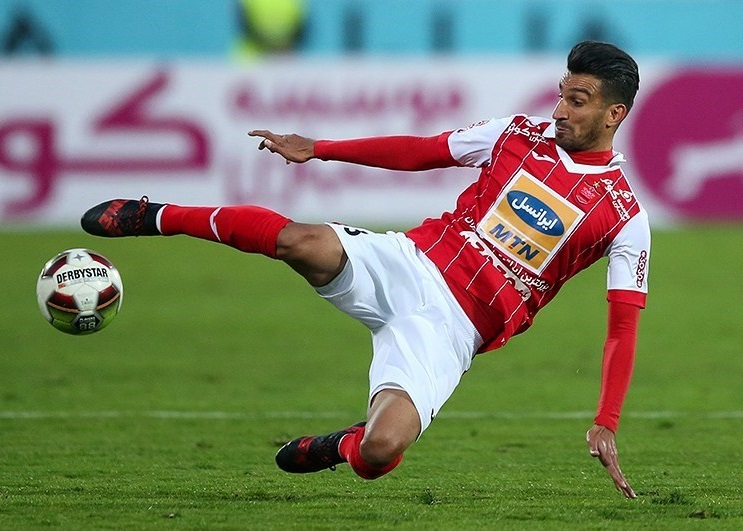
Mahini playing for Persepolis against Gostaresh Foulad on 18 January 2018

On 7 July 2012, he signed a two-year contract with the leading Tehran team, Persepolis. Mahini is known for his speed and crossing. On 2 May 2014, Mahini extended his contract with Persepolis until 2017. However, he agreed to a loan move to Malavan on 20 October 2014 to spend his conscription service, effective from 1 January 2015.

He returned to Persepolis in May 2016 after completing his service at Malavan.

On 13 January 2020, Mahini left Persepolis after 7 years playing for the team.

== International career ==
He was recruited to the Iran national football team by Carlos Queiroz for the first time. Previously, Mahini was an Iran national under-23 football team player and won a bronze medal at 2006 Asian Games. On 1 June 2014, he was brought into Iran's 2014 FIFA World Cup squad by Queiroz. He was an unused substitute in the tournament, in which Iran was eliminated in the group stages.

== Arrest ==
Mahini was arrested on September 29, 2022, by Islamic Republic security forces for voicing solidarity and support with the Iranian people during the September 2022 Iranian protests on social media. Fellow footballers such as Ali Karimi, Mehdi Mahdavikia, Mohammad Taghavi, Voria Ghafouri and Aref Gholami reacted to his arrest and expressed their support on social media.

== Club career statistics ==
As of 17 February 2020

Club	Division	Season	League		Cup and Super Cup		Asia		Total	
Club	Division	Season	Apps	Goals	Apps	Goals	Apps	Goals	Apps	Goals
Esteghlal Ahvaz	Pro League	2005–06	10	0	0	0	–	–	8	0
Esteghlal Ahvaz	Pro League	2006–07	22	1	2	0	–	–	32	1
Esteghlal Ahvaz	Pro League	2007–08	20	1	1	0	–	–	26	1
Esteghlal Ahvaz	Pro League	2008–09	22	0	2	0	–	–	22	0
Esteghlal Ahvaz	Pro League	2009–10	20	1	0	0	–	–	20	1
Esteghlal Ahvaz	Total		94	3	5	0	–	–	97	3
Zob Ahan	Pro League	2010–11	28	0	0	0	8	0	15	0
Zob Ahan	Pro League	2011–12	30	3	3	0	13	0	43	3
Zob Ahan	Total		37	3	3	0	21	0	58	3
Persepolis	Pro League	2012–13	30	1	5	1	0	0	35	2
Persepolis	Pro League	2013–14	25	0	2	0	–	–	27	0
Persepolis	Pro League	2014–15	14	0	0	0	0	0	14	0
Malavan (loan)	Pro League	2015–16	28	1	0	0	–	–	20	1
Persepolis	Pro League	2016–17	24	1	1	0	4	0	29	1
Persepolis	Pro League	2017–18	26	0	3	0	14	0	42	0
Persepolis	Pro League	2018–19	8	0	1	0	1	0	10	0
Persepolis	Pro League	2019	2	0	0	0	0	0	2	0
Persepolis	Total		149	3	12	1	19	0	179	4
Nassaji	Pro League	2020	13	0	0	0	–	–	13	0
Career total			352	8	20	1	40	0	352	10

== Honours ==
=== Club ===
Zob Ahan

- AFC Champions League runner-up: 2010

Persepolis

- Persian Gulf Pro League (3): 2016–17, 2017–18, 2018–19
- Hazfi Cup (1): 2018–19
- Iranian Super Cup (3): 2017, 2018, 2019
- AFC Champions League runner-up: 2018

=== National ===
Iran U23

- Asian Games Bronze Medal: 2006
