= Farshad Ahmadzadeh =

Iranian footballer

Personal information
- Date of birth: 23 September 1992 (age 34)
- Place of birth: Urmia, Iran
- Height: 1.69 m (5 ft 6 1/2 in)
- Positions: Winger; attacking midfielder

Team information
- Current team: Foolad
- Number: 10

Youth career
- 2003–2007: Moghavemat Urmia
- 2007–2009: Sanam Tehran
- 2009–2010: Damash Tehran
- 2010–2011: Persepolis

Senior career*
Years	Team	Apps	(Gls)
2011–2012	Parseh	14	(1)
2012–2018	Persepolis	75	(11)
2013–2015	→ Tractor (loan)	54	(6)
2018–2019	Śląsk Wrocław	25	(1)
2019–2020	Persepolis	8	(0)
2020–2021	Foolad	41	(7)
2021–2024	Sepahan	80	(7)
2024–2026	Persepolis	39	(1)
2026–	Foolad	16	(1)

International career
2012–2014	Iran U22	3	(1)
- * Club domestic league appearances and goals as of 27 February 2026

Farshad Ahmadzadeh (Persian: فرشاد احمدزاده, born 23 September 1992) is an Iranian professional footballer who plays for Foolad in the Persian Gulf Pro League.

== Club career ==
=== Parseh ===
Ahmadzadeh started his professional career with Azadegan League side Parseh, where he played 18 games, scoring two goals in his first and only season with the club.

=== Persepolis ===
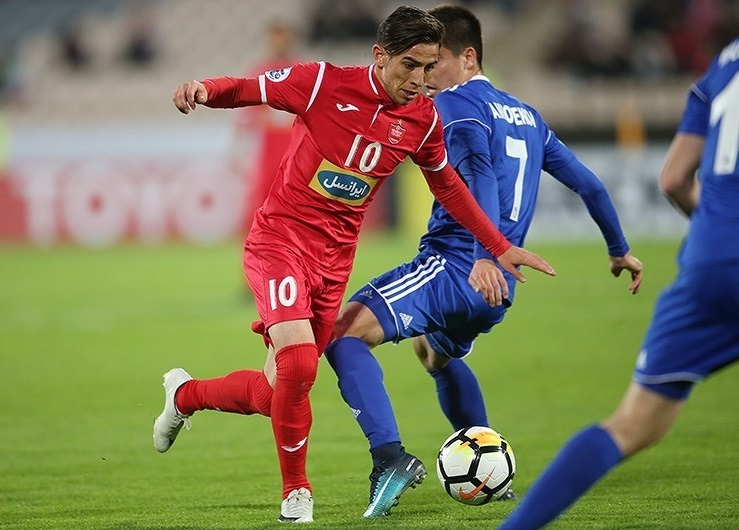
Farshad Ahmadzadeh in Persepolis F.C. and FC Nasaf Match

After a decent season with Parseh, Ahmadzadeh joined Persepolis in August 2012, signing a five-year contract. He made his Persepolis debut during a 6–0 win against Malavan on 19 December 2012 in a Hazfi Cup match. During his time at Persepolis, Ahmadzadeh won the Persian Gulf Pro League twice, as well as the 2017 Iranian Super Cup.

==== Loan to Tractor ====
At the beginning of summer 2013, Ahmadzadeh joined Tractor on loan so that he could serve his military duty. After two years on loan, meaning he had fully served his conscription duty, Ahmadzadeh was recalled to Persepolis. During his time at Tractor, Ahmadzadeh won the 2013–14 Hazfi Cup.

=== Śląsk Wrocław ===
On 4 July 2018, Ahmadzadeh officially joined Polish club Śląsk Wrocław. He had joined Śląsk Wroclaw on a one-year contract.

=== Return to Persepolis ===
On 23 June 2019, Ahmadzadeh signed a new three-year contract with Persian Gulf Pro League champions Persepolis, but was soon placed on Persepolis' transfer list.

=== Foolad ===
On 13 January 2019, Ahmadzadeh officially joined Iranian club Foolad.

=== Sepahan ===
On 24 August 2021, Ahmadzadeh joined Isfahan club Sepahan. He played a key role in the middle of the field for Sepahan and was one of the stars of the team.

=== Persepolis ===
On 17 July 2024, Ahmadzadeh joined Persepolis for another year.

== International career ==
=== U22 ===
He was called to the Iran U22 team for AFC U-22 Asian Cup qualification by coach Alireza Mansourian.

== Career statistics ==
As of 27 February 2026

Club	Season	League			National cup (Note: Includes Hazfi Cup, Polish Cup)		Continental		Other		Total	
Club	Season	Division	Apps	Goals	Apps	Goals	Apps	Goals	Apps	Goals	Apps	Goals
Parseh	2011–12	Division 1	18	2	1	0	—		—		19	2
Persepolis	2012–13	Pro League	1	0	1	0	—		—		2	0
Tractor	2013–14	Pro League	27	3	1	0	5	1	—		33	4
Tractor	2014–15	Pro League	27	3	2	2	4	1	—		33	6
Tractor	Total		54	6	3	2	9	2	—		66	10
Persepolis	2015–16	Pro League	27	3	2	0	—		—		29	3
Persepolis	2016–17	Pro League	24	2	1	0	10	0	—		35	2
Persepolis	2017–18	Pro League	23	6	2	1	7	1	1 (Note: Appearance in Iranian Super Cup)	1	33	9
Persepolis	Total		74	11	5	1	17	1	1	1	97	14
Śląsk Wrocław	2018–19	Ekstraklasa	25	1	2	0	—		—		27	1
Persepolis	2019–20	Pro League	8	0	2	0	0	0	0	0	10	0
Foolad	2019–20	Pro League	14	2	0	0	0	0	0	0	14	2
Foolad	2020–21	Pro League	27	5	2	0	7	0	0	0	36	5
Foolad	Total		41	7	2	0	7	0	0	0	50	7
Sepahan	2021–22	Pro League	28	2	2	1	5	0	0	0	35	3
Sepahan	2022–23	Pro League	27	3	1	1	0	0	0	0	28	4
Sepahan	2023–24	Pro League	25	2	4	1	7	3	0	0	36	6
Sepahan	Total		80	7	7	3	12	3	0	0	99	13
Persepolis	2024–25	Pro League	27	1	2	1	8	0	0	0	37	2
Persepolis	2025–26	Pro League	12	0	1	0	—		—		13	0
Persepolis	Total		39	1	3	1	8	0	0	0	50	2
Foolad	2025–26	Pro League	7	1	0	0	—		—		7	1
Career total			347	36	26	7	53	6	1	1	427	50

== Honours ==
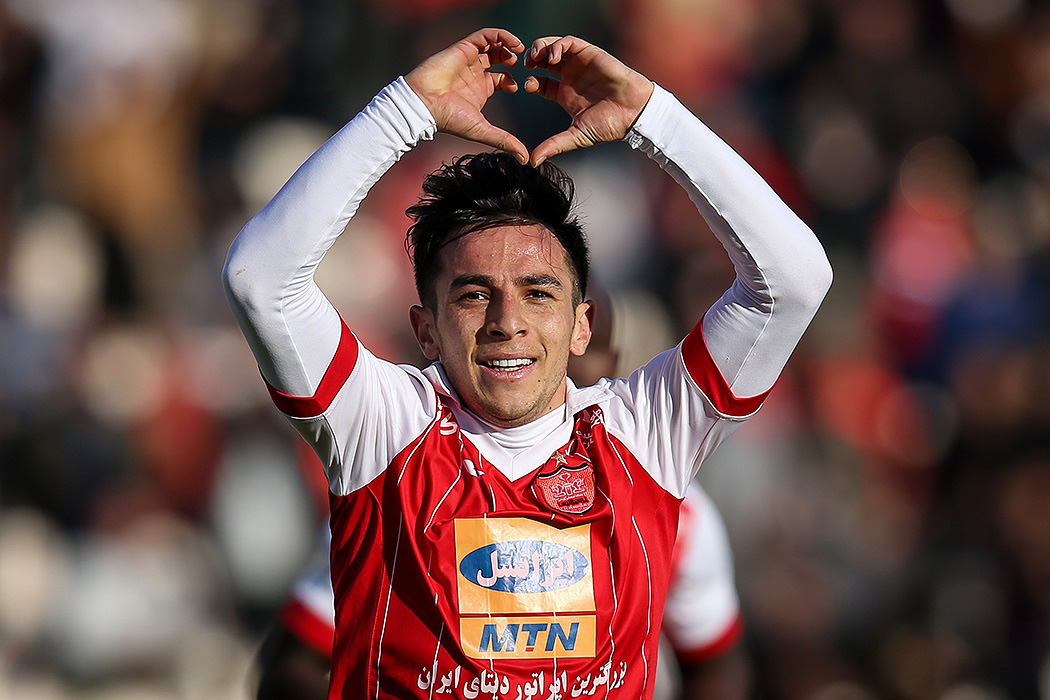
Ahmadzadeh playing for Persepolis

Tractor

- Hazfi Cup: 2013–14

Persepolis

- Persian Gulf Pro League: 2016–17, 2017–18
- Iranian Super Cup: 2017

Foolad

- Hazfi Cup: 2020–21

Sepahan

- Hazfi Cup: 2023–24
