= Yousif Al-Zaabi =

Emirati footballer (born 1986)

Personal information
- Full name: Yousef Abdullah Al Zaabi
- Date of birth: 15 January 1986 (age 40)
- Place of birth: United Arab Emirates
- Height: 1.84 m (6 ft 0 in)
- Position: Goalkeeper

Youth career
- Ittihad Kalba

Senior career*
| Years | Team | Apps | (Gls) |
| 2006–2009 | Ittihad Kalba | | |
| 2009–2014 | Al-Ahli | | |
| 2012–2013 | → Ajman (loan) | 18 | (0) |
| 2013–2014 | → Al-Nasr (loan) | 12 | (0) |
| 2014–2019 | Al-Wasl | 45 | (0) |
| 2019-2021 | Ittihad Kalba | 3 | (0) |
- * Club domestic league appearances and goals

Yousef Al Zaabi (Arabic:يوسف الزعابي) (born 15 January 1986) is an Emirati footballer who played as a goalkeeper.
