= 2017 Iranian Super Cup =

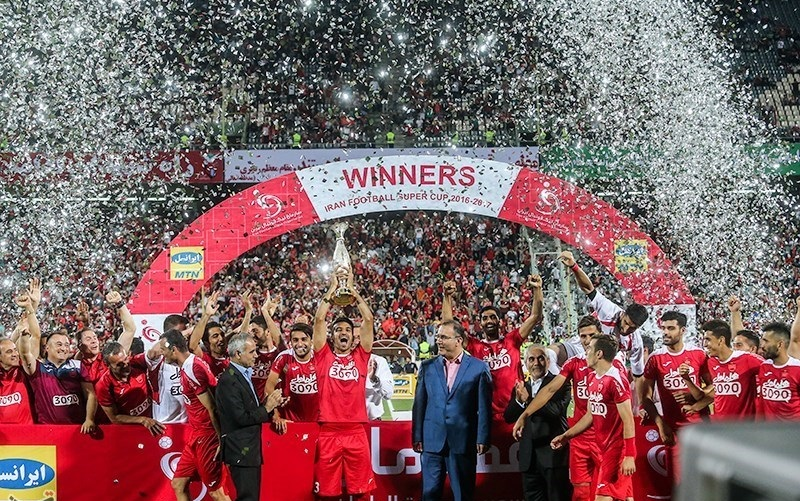
Persepolis	Naft Tehran
Persian Gulf Pro League	Hazfi Cup
3	0
- Date: 21 July 2017
- Venue: Azadi Stadium, Tehran
- Man of the Match: Ali Alipoor (Persepolis)
- Referee: Bijan Heydari
- Attendance: 40,000
- Weather: Partly Cloudy; 29 °C (85 °F); 19% humidity

The 2017 Iranian Super Cup was the 3rd Iranian Super Cup, held on 21 July 2017 between the 2016–17 Persian Gulf Pro League champions Persepolis and the 2016–17 Hazfi Cup winners Naft Tehran.

Persepolis won the Iranian Super Cup 3–0 for the first time.

== Match ==
21 July 2017
21:00

Persepolis	3–0	Naft Tehran
Alipoor 18'; Mosalman 66'; Ahmadzadeh 83' (pen.)

Azadi Stadium, Tehran
Attendance: 40,000
Referee: Bijan Heydari

Persepolis
GK	1	(Iran) Alireza Beiranvand
RB	13	(Iran) Hossein Mahini (c)
CB	3	(Iran) Shoja' Khalilzadeh
CB	15	(Iran) Mohammad Ansari
LB	69	(Iran) Shayan Mosleh
RM	10	(Iran) Farshad Ahmadzadeh
CM	18	(Iran) Mohsen Rabiekhah
CM	77	(Iran) Mohsen Mosalman	(substituted off) 88'
LM	19	(Iran) Vahid Amiri	(substituted off) 84'
RF	9	(Iran) Mehdi Taremi	(substituted off) 74'
LF	70	(Iran) Ali Alipour
Substitutes:
GK	44	(Croatia) Božidar Radošević
DF	4	(Iran) Jalal Hosseini
MF	11	(Iran) Kamal Kamyabinia	(substituted in) 84'
MF	25	(Iran) Ehsan Alvanzadeh
MF	37	(Iran) Hamidreza Taherkhani	(substituted in) 88'
MF	88	(Iran) Siamak Nemati	(substituted in) 74'
MF	21	(Iran) Adam Hemati
Manager:
(Croatia) Branko Ivanković

Naft Tehran
GK	40	(Iran) Milad Farahani
RB	5	(Iran) Taher Jahanbakhsh
CB	8	(Iran) Arash Shahamati
CB	20	(Iran) Hossein Jafari
LB	4	(Iran) Farid Mohammadizadeh
RM	23	(Iran) Amirhossein Feshangchi	(substituted off) 74'
CM	6	(Iran) Alireza Ezzati (c)
CM	78	(Iran) Mojtaba Haghdoust
CM	88	(Iran) Farshad Hashemi
LM	99	(Iran) Ali Mirferat
CF	10	(Iran) Issa Alekasir
Substitutes:
GK	50	(Iran) Shahab Adeli
DF	2	(Iran) Meysam Bashoki
MF	3	(Georgia (country)) Saba Tavadze
MF	9	(Iran) Ali Khodaei	(substituted in) 74'
MF	18	(Iran) Milad Souri
FW	7	(Iran) Amir Arsalan Motahari
FW	11	(Iran) Iman Mousavi
Manager:
(Iran) Mojtaba Khorshidi
