= 2019–20 Persepolis F.C. season =

Persepolis
2019–20 season
- Chairman: Iraj Arab (until September 30, 2019); Mohammad Hassan Ansarifard (until March 11, 2019); Mehdi Rasoul Panah (from March 11, 2019)
- Manager: Gabriel Calderón (until January 12, 2020); Yahya Golmohammadi (from January 13, 2020)
- Stadium: Azadi Stadium
- Persian Gulf Pro League: Winners
- Hazfi Cup: Semi-Final
- Iranian Super Cup: Winners
- AFC Champions League: Group Stage (continues to next season)
- Top goalscorer: League: Mehdi Torabi, Ali Alipour; All: Ali Alipour
| Home colours | Away colours |

The 2019–20 season are the Persepolis's 19th season in the Pro League, and their 37th consecutive season in the top division of Iranian Football. They were also competing in the Hazfi Cup, Super Cup and AFC Champions League.

== Squad ==
=== First team squad ===
| No. | Name | Age | Nationality | Position (s) | Since | App | Goals | Assist | Ends | Signed from | Transfer fee | Notes |
Goalkeepers
| 1 | Alireza Beiranvand | 31 | (Iran) | GK | 2016 | 199 | 0 | 1 | 2024 | Naft Tehran | Free | |
| 12 | Sasan Zamaneh | 20 | (Iran) | GK | 2019 | 0 | 0 | 0 | 2024 | Esteghlal | Free | U-21 |
| 44 | Božidar Radošević | 36 | (Croatia) | GK | 2016 | 42 | 0 | 0 | 2023 | (Hungary) Debreceni | Free | |
| 63 | Amirhossein Bayat | 21 | (Iran) | GK | 2019 | 0 | 0 | 0 | 2022 | Baadraan | Free | U-23 |
Defenders
| 3 | Shoja' Khalilzadeh | 30 | (Iran) | CB / RB | 2017 | 82 | 10 | 2 | 2022 | Sepahan | Free | |
| 4 | Jalal Hosseini | 37 | (Iran) | CB / RB | 2016 | 166 | 6 | 4 | 2022 | Naft Tehran | Free | |
| 6 | Hossein Kanaanizadegan | 25 | (Iran) | CB / RB / LB | 2013 | 13 | 1 | 0 | 2021 | Machine Sazi | Free | |
| 15 | Mohammad Ansari | 28 | (Iran) | LB / CB / DM | 2015 | 108 | 3 | 3 | 2021 | Shahrdar Tabriz | Free | |
| 17 | Mehdi Shiri | 28 | (Iran) | RB / RM / RW / DM | 2018 | 28 | 0 | 3 | 2021 | Paykan | Free | |
| 28 | Mohammad Naderi | 23 | (Iran) | LB / CB | 2019 | 25 | 0 | 1 | 2020 | (Belgium) Kortrijk | Loan | U-23 |
| 33 | Sina Mahdavi | 20 | (Iran) | LB | 2020 | 0 | 0 | 0 | 2023 | Academy | Free | U-23 |
| 38 | Ehsan Hosseini | 21 | (Iran) | CB / DM | 2017 | 3 | 0 | 0 | 2022 | Academy | Free | U-23 |
Midfielders
| 2 | Omid Alishah | 27 | (Iran) | LM / RM / LW / RW / SS | 2013 | 107 | 15 | 22 | 2021 | Rah Ahan | Free | |
| 5 | Bashar Resan | 23 | (Iraq) | AM / RM / LM / CM | 2017 | 63 | 2 | 4 | 2020 | (Iraq) Al-Quwa Al-Jawiya | Free | U-25 |
| 8 | Ahmad Nourollahi | 26 | (Iran) | DM / CM / RM / LM | 2014 | 135 | 6 | 7 | 2022 | Foolad Yazd | Free | |
| 9 | Mehdi Torabi | 25 | (Iran) | RM / LM / RW / LW / AM | 2018 | 25 | 9 | 9 | 2021 | Saipa | Free | |
| 11 | Kamal Kamyabinia | 30 | (Iran) | DM / CM / RM / LM | 2015 | 137 | 16 | 4 | 2021 | Naft Tehran | Free | |
| 18 | Mohsen Rabiekhah | 32 | (Iran) | DM / CB / LB | 2016 | 72 | 1 | 1 | 2021 | Sanat Naft | Free | |
| 19 | Vahid Amiri | 31 | (Iran) | LM / RM / LW / RW / SS / CF | 2016 | 53 | 12 | 17 | 2021 | (Turkey) Trabzonspor | Free | |
| 26 | Saeid Hosseinpour | 21 | (Iran) | AM / CM / DM | 2017 | 8 | 0 | 0 | 2022 | Paykan | Free | U-23 |
| 80 | Mohammad Hosseini | 20 | (Iran) | AM / CM / DM | 2020 | 0 | 0 | 0 | 2023 | Academy | Free | U-23 |
| 88 | Siamak Nemati | 25 | (Iran) | RM / LM / AM / CM / SS | 2017 | 74 | 9 | 6 | 2021 | Paykan | Free | |
Forwards
| 10 | Anthony Stokes | 31 | (Republic of Ireland) | CF / SS / LW | 2020 | 1 | 0 | 0 | 2020 | (Turkey) Adana Demirspor | Free | |
| 16 | Mehdi Abdi | 31 | (Iran) | CF / SS | 2017 | 8 | 3 | 0 | 2022 | Academy | Free | U-23 |
| 20 | Amir Roostaei | 22 | (Iran) | CF / LW / RW | 2019 | 2 | 0 | 0 | 2022 | Paykan | Free | U-23 |
| 25 | Aria Barzegar | 17 | (Iran) | CF / SS | 2019 | 0 | 0 | 0 | 2022 | Khalij Fars | Free | U-21 |
| 70 | Ali Alipour | 25 | (Iran) | CF / RW / LW | 2015 | 167 | 59 | 25 | 2020 | Rah Ahan | Free | |
| 99 | Christian Osaguona | 29 | (Nigeria) | CF / SS | 2020 | 3 | 0 | 1 | 2020 | (South Korea) Jeju United | Free | |
Players left the club during the season
| 7 | Júnior Brandão | 24 | (Brazil) | CF / SS | 2019 | 6 | 0 | 0 | 2019 | Loan Return | | |
| 23 | Mohammad Amin Asadi | 21 | (Iran) | CF / SS | 2017 | 9 | 0 | 0 | 2019 | Loan to Naft Masjed Soleyman | | |
| 21 | Adam Hemati | 24 | (Iran) (Canada) | RB / RM / RW | 2017 | 12 | 1 | 0 | 2020 | Transfer to Pars Jonoubi | | |
| 10 | Farshad Ahmadzadeh | 27 | (Iran) | AM / RW / LW / SS | 2019 | 85 | 14 | 12 | 2020 | Transfer to Foolad | | |
| 13 | Hossein Mahini | 33 | (Iran) | RB / LB / CB / DM | 2012 | 157 | 3 | 6 | 2020 | Transfer to Nassaji | | |

== New Contracts ==
| No | P | Name | Age | Contract length | Contract ends | Source |
|---|---|---|---|---|---|---|
| 3 | DF | Shoja' Khalilzadeh | 30 | 3 season | 2022 | |
| 69 | DF | Shayan Mosleh | 25 | 2 season | 2021 | |
| 15 | DF | Mohammad Ansari | 27 | 2 season | 2021 | |
| 88 | MF | Siamak Nemati | 25 | 1 season | 2021 | |
| 18 | MF | Mohsen Rabiekhah | 31 | 1 season | 2021 | |
| 2 | MF | Omid Alishah | 27 | 1 season | 2021 | |
| 26 | MF | Saeid Hosseinpour | 20 | 1 season | 2022 | |
| 38 | DF | Ehsan Hosseini | 20 | 1 season | 2022 | |
| 1 | GK | Alireza Beiranvand | 26 | 2 season | 2023 | |
| 8 | MF | Ahmad Nourollahi | 26 | 2 season | 2022 | |
| 17 | DF | Mehdi Shiri | 28 | 1 season | 2021 | |
| 44 | GK | Božidar Radošević | 30 | 3 season | 2023 | |

== Transfers ==
=== In ===
| No | P | Name | Age | Moving from | Ends | Transfer fee | Type | Transfer window | Quota | Source |
|---|---|---|---|---|---|---|---|---|---|---|
| 37 | MF | Hamidreza Taherkhani | 20 | Sepidrood Rasht | 2021 | — | Loan return | Summer | | |
| 16 | FW | Mehdi Abdi | 20 | Baadraan | 2022 | — | Loan return | Summer | U-23 | |
| 12 | GK | Sasan Zamaneh | 20 | Esteghlal | 2024 | — | Transfer | Summer | U-21 | |
| 10 | MF | Farshad Ahmadzadeh | 26 | (Poland) Śląsk Wrocław | 2022 | — | Transfer | Summer | | |
| 6 | DF | Hossein Kanaanizadegan | 25 | Machine Sazi | 2021 | — | Transfer | Summer | PL | |
| 19 | MF | Vahid Amiri | 31 | (Turkey) Trabzonspor | 2021 | — | Transfer | Summer | | |
| 20 | FW | Amir Roostaei | 21 | Paykan | 2022 | — | Transfer | Summer | PL | |
| 63 | GK | Amir Hossein Bayat | 21 | Baadraan | 2022 | — | Transfer | Summer | U-23 | |
| 7 | FW | (Brazil) Júnior Brandão | 24 | (Bulgaria) Ludogorets | 2020 | — | Loan | Summer | | |
| 25 | FW | Aria Barzegar | 17 | Khalij Fars | 2022 | — | Transfer | Summer(During First Half Season) | U-21 | |
| 99 | FW | (Nigeria) Christian Osaguona | 29 | (South Korea) Jeju United | 2020 | — | Transfer | Winter | | |
| 10 | FW | (Republic of Ireland) Anthony Stokes | 31 | (Turkey) Adana Demirspor | 2020 | — | Transfer | Winter | | |
| 33 | LB | Sina Mahdavi | 21 | Academy | 2023 | — | Transfer | Winter(During Second half season) | U-23 | |
| 80 | CM | Mohammad Hosseini | 21 | Academy | 2023 | — | Transfer | Winter(During Second half season) | U-23 | |

=== Out ===
| No | P | Name | Age | Moving to | Transfer fee | Type | Transfer window | Source |
|---|---|---|---|---|---|---|---|---|
| 19 | CF | (Croatia) Mario Budimir | 33 | (Croatia) Lokomotiva | Free | Transfer | Summer | |
| 7 | MF | Soroush Rafiei | 29 | Shahr Khodro | Free | Transfer | Summer | |
| 69 | DF | Shayan Mosleh | 26 | Sepahan | Free | Transfer | Summer | |
| 37 | MF | Hamidreza Taherkhani | 20 | Unattached | Free | Released | Summer | |
| 10 | FW | Mehdi Sharifi | 26 | (Azerbaijan) Sumgayit | Free | Transfer | Summer | |
| 12 | GK | Abolfazl Darvishvand | 22 | Shahin Bushehr | Free | Transfer | Summer | |
| 77 | FW | Saeid Karimi | 19 | Shahin Bushehr | Free | Transfer | Summer | |
| 7 | FW | (Brazil) Júnior Brandão | 24 | (Bulgaria) Ludogorets | Free | Loan return | Summer(during first half season) | |
| 23 | FW | Mohammad Amin Asadi | 20 | Naft Masjed Soleyman | Free | Loan | Winter | |
| 21 | RB | Adam Hemati | 24 | Pars Jonoubi | Free | Transfer | Winter | |
| 10 | MF | Farshad Ahmadzadeh | 27 | Foolad | Free | Transfer | Winter | |
| 13 | RB | Hossein Mahini | 33 | Nassaji | Free | Transfer | Winter | |

=== Transfer(cost and benefit) ===
Undisclosed fees are not included in the transfer totals.

Expenditure

Summer: ▼€4,100,000

Winter: ▼€1,050,000

Total: ▼€5,150,000

Income

Summer: ▲€2,975,000

Winter: ▲€100,000

Total: ▲€3,075,000

Net totals

Summer: ▼€1,125,000

Winter: ▼€950,000

Total: ▼€2,075,000

== Technical staff ==
Persepolis Head coaches in 2019–20 Persian Gulf Pro League

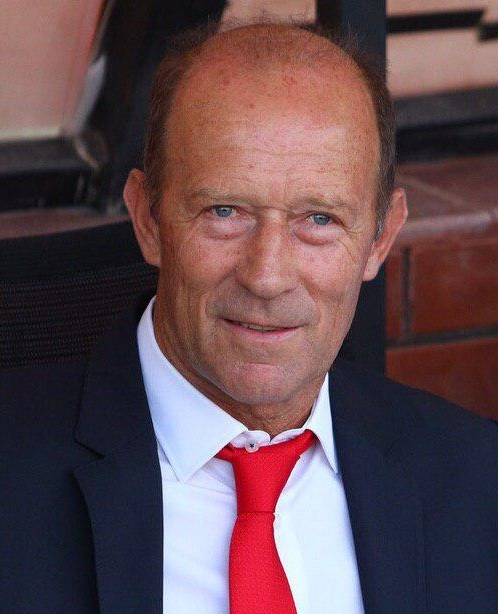
Gabriel Calderón
(First half season)

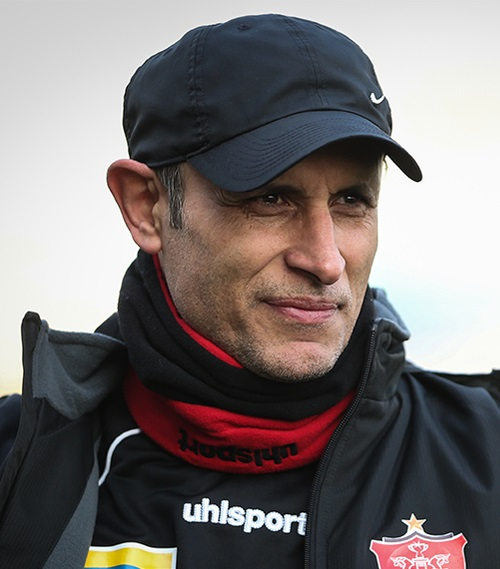
Yahya Golmohammadi
(Second half season)

| Position | Staff |
|---|---|
| Head coach | (Iran) Yahya Golmohammadi |
| Assistant coach | (Iran) Hamid Motahari |
| First-team coach | (Iran) Karim Bagheri |
| Goalkeeping coach | (Iran) Davoud Fanaei |
| Physical fitness trainer | (Iran) Dr. Mazaher Rahimpour |
| Analyzer | (Iran) Mohammad Asgari |
| Doctor | (Iran) Dr. Alireza Haghighat |
| Physiotherapist | (Iran) Meysam Alipour |
| Team Manager | (Iran) Afshin Peyrovani |
| Media Officer | (Iran) Alireza Ashraf |

== Competitions ==
=== Overview ===
| Competition | First match | Last match | Starting round | Final position | Record | | | | | | | |
| Competition | First match | Last match | Starting round | Final position | Pld | W | D | L | GF | GA | GD | Win % |
|---|---|---|---|---|---|---|---|---|---|---|---|---|
| PGPL | 22 August 2019 | 20 August 2020 | Matchday 1 | Winners | 30 | 21 | 4 | 5 | 46 | 17 | +29 | 70.00 |
| Hazfi Cup | 30 Setamber 2019 | 26 August 2020 | Round of 32 | Semi-Finals | 4 | 3 | 1 | 0 | 6 | 2 | +4 | 75.00 |
| Super Cup | | | Final | Winners | 0 | 0 | 0 | 0 | 0 | 0 | +0 | — |
| ACL | 11 February 2020 | 18 February 2020 | Group stage | | 2 | 0 | 1 | 1 | 2 | 4 | −2 | 0.00 |
| Total | | | | | 36 | 24 | 6 | 6 | 54 | 23 | +31 | 66.67 |

Last updated: 28 SEP 2020
Source: Competitions

=== Persian Gulf Pro League ===
==== Results summary ====
| Overall | | | | | | | | Home | | | | | | Away | | | | | |
| Pld | W | D | L | GF | GA | GD | Pts | W | D | L | GF | GA | GD | W | D | L | GF | GA | GD |
|---|---|---|---|---|---|---|---|---|---|---|---|---|---|---|---|---|---|---|---|
| 30 | 21 | 4 | 5 | 46 | 17 | +29 | 67 | 10 | 2 | 3 | 19 | 9 | +10 | 11 | 2 | 2 | 27 | 8 | +19 |

Last updated: 19 December 2019.
Source: Ipl Stats

==== Results by round ====
| Round | 1 | 2 | 3 | 4 | 5 | 6 | 7 | 8 | 9 | 10 | 11 | 12 | 13 | 14 | 15 | 16 | 17 | 18 | 19 | 20 | 21 | 22 | 23 | 24 | 25 | 26 | 27 | 28 | 29 | 30 |
|---|---|---|---|---|---|---|---|---|---|---|---|---|---|---|---|---|---|---|---|---|---|---|---|---|---|---|---|---|---|---|
| Ground | H | A | H | A | H | A | H | A | H | A | H | H | A | H | A | A | H | A | H | A | H | A | H | A | H | A | A | H | A | H |
| Result | W | L | W | W | L | L | W | W | D | W | L | W | W | W | W | W | W | W | D | W | W | W | W | W | W | W | D | L | D | W |
| Position | 5 | 8 | 4 | 2 | 4 | 7 | 6 | 4 | 4 | 3 | 5 | 5 | 2 | 1 | 1 | 1 | 1 | 1 | 1 | 1 | 1 | 1 | 1 | 1 | 1 | 1 | 1 | 1 | 1 | 1 |

Updated to match(es) played on 19 December 2019. Source: "iranleague". Archived from the original on 2018-01-26.
A = Away; H = Home; W = Win; D = Draw; L = Loss; P = Postponed

==== League table ====
| Pos | Team | Pld | W | D | L | GF | GA | GD | Pts | Qualification or relegation |
|---|---|---|---|---|---|---|---|---|---|---|
| 1 | Persepolis (C) | 30 | 21 | 4 | 5 | 46 | 17 | +29 | 67 | Qualification for 2021 AFC Champions League group stage |
| 2 | Esteghlal | 30 | 14 | 11 | 5 | 55 | 31 | +24 | 53 | Qualification for 2021 AFC Champions League group stage |
| 3 | Foolad | 30 | 14 | 9 | 7 | 28 | 19 | +9 | 51 | Qualification for 2021 AFC Champions League qualifying play-offs |
| 4 | Tractor | 30 | 14 | 8 | 8 | 31 | 23 | +8 | 50 | Qualification for 2021 AFC Champions League group stage (Note: Tractor qualified to AFC Champions League group stage directly by winning the Hazfi Cup) |
| 5 | Sepahan | 30 | 12 | 13 | 5 | 39 | 22 | +17 | 49 | |

Source: IPL Table, Soccerway
Rules for classification: 1) Points; 2) Goal difference; 3) Goals scored.
(C) Champions

==== Matches ====
Win Draw Loss Postponed

| Date Round | Home | Score | Away | Location |

| 23 August 2019 1 | Persepolis | 1–0 | Pars Jonoubi | Tehran |
| 19:10 DST +04:30 | Hosseini (yellow card) 30'; Torabi 58' | | | Stadium: Azadi Stadium |

| 30 August 2019 2 | Tractor | 1–0 | Persepolis | Tabriz |
| 17:45 DST +04:30 | | | Siamak Nemati (yellow card) 19'; Alireza Beiranvand (yellow card) 86' | Stadium: Yadegar-e Emam Stadium |

| 16 September 2019 3 | Persepolis | 1–0 | Sanat Naft Abadan | Tehran |
| 19:45 DST +04:30 | khalilzadeh (yellow card) 44'; Hossein Kanaanizadegan 57' | | | Stadium: Azadi Stadium |

| 22 September 2019 4 | Esteghlal | 0–1 | Persepolis | Tehran |
| 18:45 DST +04:30 | | | Hossein Kanaanizadegan (yellow card) 42'; Mehdi Abdi 81'; Farshad Ahmadzadeh (yellow card) 93'; Siamak Nemati (yellow card) 94' | Stadium: Azadi Stadium |

| 26 September 2019 5 | Persepolis | 0–2 | Sepahan | Tehran |
| 16:15 DST +04:30 | Vahid Amiri (yellow card) 20'; Siamak Nemati (yellow card) 32'; Hossein Kanaanizadegan (yellow card) 43'; Alireza Beiranvand (yellow card) 74'; Bashar Resan (yellow card) 90'; Shoja' Khalilzadeh (yellow card) 94' | | | Stadium: Azadi Stadium |

| 4 October 2019 6 | Shahr Khodro | 1–0 | Persepolis | Mashhad |
| 18:15 DST +04:30 | | | Siamak Nemati (yellow card) 37' | Stadium: Imam Reza Stadium |

| 20 October 2019 7 | Persepolis | 2–1 | Paykan | Tehran |
| 19:00 DST +04:30 | Torabi 19'; Torabi (yellow card) 62'; Ahmad Nourollahi 82'; Mehdi Abdi (red card) 83' | | | Stadium: Azadi Stadium |

| 25 October 2019 8 | Shahin Bushehr | 0–5 | Persepolis | Bushehr |
| 16:45 DST +04:30 | | | A. Alipour 6', 38', 55'; V. Amiri 29'; SH . Khalilzadeh 67'; F. Ahmadzadeh (yellow card) 92' (red card) 92' | Stadium: Shahid Mahdavi Stadium |

| 31 October 2019 9 | Persepolis | 0–0 | Machine Sazi | Tehran |
| 17:45 DST +04:30 | SH . Khalilzadeh (yellow card) 62'; A. Alipour (penalty missed) 90' | | | Stadium: Azadi Stadium |

| 5 November 2019 10 | Foolad | 0–1 | Persepolis | Ahvaz |
| 17:45 DST +04:30 | | | Torabi 8' (pen.); Naderi (yellow card) 84' | Stadium: Foolad Arena |

| 22 November 2019 11 | Persepolis | 0–1 | Naft Masjed Soleyman | Tehran |
| 17:30 DST +04:30 | | | | Stadium: Azadi Stadium |

| 27 December 2019 12 | Persepolis | 1–0 | Nassaji Mazandaran | Tehran |
| 17:30 DST +04:30 | V. Amiri 34'; M. Rabiekhah (yellow card) 40' (red card) 58' | | | Stadium: Azadi Stadium |

| 5 December 2019 13 | Zob Ahan | 0–3 | Persepolis | Fooladshahr |
| 17:30 DST +04:30 | | | Ahmad Nourollahi (yellow card) 45'; A. Alipour 58'; Torabi 16' (pen.), 65' | Stadium: Foolad Shahr Stadium |

| 10 December 2019 14 | Persepolis | 2–1 | Gol Gohar | Tehran |
| 17:30 DST +04:30 | Torabi 52'; A. Alipour 80'; Mehdi Abdi (yellow card) 88'; Mohammad Ansari (yellow card) 92'; SH . khalilzadeh (yellow card) 94' | | | Stadium: Azadi Stadium |

| 14 December 2019 15 | Saipa | 0–2 | Persepolis | Tehran |
| 17:30 DST +04:30 | | | V. Amiri 18'; Ahmad Nourollahi 85' | Stadium: Dastgerdi |

| 19 December 2019 16 | Pars Jonoubi | 0–1 | Persepolis | Jam |
| 17:30 DST +04:30 | | | Torabi 95' | Stadium: Takhti Jam |

| 26 January 2020 17 | Persepolis | 2–0 | Tractor | Tehran |
| 15:15 DST +04:30 | Torabi (yellow card) 8'; A. Alipour 9' ( (yellow card) 83'); SH . khalilzadeh (yellow card) 36'; V. Amiri 55'; Christian Osaguona (yellow card) 70'; Alireza Beiranvand (yellow card) 76'; Hossein Hosseini (yellow card) 83'; Kamal Kamyabinia (yellow card) 90' | | | Stadium: Azadi Stadium |

| 1 February 2020 18 | Sanat Naft Abadan | 0–1 | Persepolis | Abadan |
| 17:30 DST +04:30 | | | Ahmad Nourollahi 32'; SH . khalilzadeh (yellow card) 37' | Stadium: Takhti Abadan |

| 6 February 2020 19 | Persepolis | 2–2 | Esteghlal | Tehran |
| 15:30 DST +04:30 | A. Alipour 29'; A. Alipour (yellow card) 30'; Christian Osaguona (yellow card) 55'; Bashar Resan 89' | | | Stadium: Azadi Stadium |

| 23 February 2020 20 | Sepahan | 0–3 | Persepolis | Isfahan |
| 16:15 DST +04:30 | | | | Stadium: Naghsh-e-Jahan |
Note: The match was not played, because Sepahan refused to do it. Football Federation declared the match 3–0 in favor of Persepolis.

| 27 February 2020 21 | Persepolis | 3–1 | Shahr Khodro | Tehran |
| 18:30 DST +04:30 | V. Amiri 9' ( (yellow card) 95'); Bashar Resan 16'; Torabi 64' (pen.) | | | Stadium: Azadi Stadium |

| 28 June 2020 22 | Paykan | 1–3 | Persepolis | Shahr-e Qods |
| 21:00 DST +04:30 | | | A. Alipour 21'; Siamak Nemati (yellow card) 71'; Mehdi Abdi 76', 84'; SH . khalilzadeh (yellow card) 91' | Stadium: Shahr-e Qods Stadium |

| 4 July 2020 23 | Persepolis | 1–0 | Shahin Bushehr | Tehran |
| 21:00 DST +04:30 | K. Kamyabinia (red card) 43'; Torabi 65' | | | Stadium: Azadi Stadium |

| 10 July 2020 24 | Machine Sazi | 0–1 | Persepolis | Tabriz |
| 20:15 DST +04:30 | | | Torabi 85' (pen.) | Stadium: Bonyan Diesel |

| 18 July 2020 25 | Persepolis | 1–0 | Foolad | Tehran |
| 21:00 DST +04:30 | Siamak Nemati 68' (yellow card) 70' | | | Stadium: Azadi Stadium |

| 24 July 2020 26 | Naft Masjed Soleyman | 1–2 | Persepolis | Masjed Soleyman |
| 21:00 DST +04:30 | | | A. Alipour 39'; Mehdi Abdi 58' (yellow card) 37'; K. Kamyabinia (yellow card) 56' | Stadium: Behnam Mohammadi Stadium |

| 1 August 2020 27 | Nassaji Mazandaran | 1–1 | Persepolis | Qaemshahr |
| 20:45 DST +04:30 | | | A. Alipour 19' (pen.) | Stadium: Vatani Stadium |

| 7 August 2020 28 | Persepolis | 0–1 | Zob Ahan | Tehran |
| 17:30 DST +04:30 | Bashar Resan (yellow card) 17'; Shoja' Khalilzadeh (yellow card) 64'; Omid Alishah (yellow card) 84'; Vahid Amiri (yellow card) 90' | | | Stadium: Azadi Stadium |

| 15 August 2020 29 | Gol Gohar | 3–3 | Persepolis | Sirjan |
| 17:30 DST +04:30 | | | K. Kamyabinia (red card) 15'; Shoja' Khalilzadeh (yellow card) 19'; A. Alipour 49'; Ahmad Nourollahi 71'; Torabi 92' (pen.) | Stadium: Imam Ali Stadium |

| 20 August 2020 30 | Persepolis | 3–0 | Saipa | Tehran |
| 17:30 DST +04:30 | V. Amiri 4'; Christian Osaguona 45'; Bashar Resan (yellow card) 56'; A. Alipour 90' | | | Stadium: Azadi Stadium |

==== Score overview ====
Win Draw Loss

| Opposition | Home score | Away score | Aggregate score |
|---|---|---|---|
| Esteghlal | 2–2 | 0–1 | 3–2 |
| Foolad | 1–0 | 0–1 | 2–0 |
| Gol Gohar | 2–1 | 3–3 | 5–4 |
| Machine Sazi | 0–0 | 0–1 | 1–0 |
| Naft Masjed Soleyman | 0–1 | 1–2 | 2–2 |
| Nassaji | 1–0 | 1–1 | 2–1 |
| Pars Jonoubi | 1–0 | 0–1 | 2–0 |
| Paykan | 2–1 | 1–3 | 5–2 |
| Saipa | 3–0 | 0–2 | 5–0 |
| Sanat Naft | 1–0 | 0–1 | 2–0 |
| Sepahan | 0–2 | 0–3 | 3–2 |
| Shahin Bushehr | 1–0 | 0–5 | 6–0 |
| Shahr Khodro | 3–1 | 1–0 | 3–2 |
| Tractor | 2–0 | 1–0 | 2–1 |
| Zob Ahan | 0–1 | 0–3 | 3–1 |

=== Hazfi Cup ===
==== Matches ====
Win Draw Loss Postponed

| Date Round | Home | Score | Away | Location |

| 30 September 2019 Round of 32 | Mashin Sazi | 0–1 | Persepolis | Tabriz |
| 15:00 | | | Ali Alipour (penalty missed) 88'; Vahid Amiri 90+11' | Stadium: Bonyan Dizel; Referee: Koopal Nazemi |

| 26 November 2019 Round of 16 | Persepolis | 1–0 | Sanat Naft | Tehran |
| 16:15 | Torabi 54' | | | Stadium: Azadi Stadium |

| 23 December 2019 Quarter-Final | Shahrdari Mahshahr | 0–2 | Persepolis | Abadan |
| 16:30 | | | Naderi (yellow card) 28'; F. Ahmadzadeh (yellow card) 72'; A. Alipour 59', 72'; Vahid Amiri (yellow card) 91' | Stadium: Takhti Stadium |

| 26 August 2020 Semi-Final | Persepolis | 2–2 (a.e.t.) (1–4 p) | Esteghlal | Tehran |
| 19:00 | Bashar Resan 49'; Ali Alipour 88' | | Mehdi Ghaedi 4'; Mohammad Daneshgar 90+3' | Stadium: Azadi; Attendance: 0 (Note: The remainder of the competition, held in August 2020, will be played behind closed doors due to the COVID-19 pandemic in Iran.); Referee: Payam Heydari |
| | Penalties |
| | Ahmad Nourollahi (penalty missed); Omid Alishah (penalty scored); Christian Osaguona (penalty missed) | | (penalty scored) Cheick Diabaté; (penalty scored) Vouria Ghafouri; (penalty scored) Hrvoje Milić; (penalty scored) Amir Arsalan Motahari |
Note: Derby 93

=== Super Cup ===
Since Persepolis won both 2018-19 Persian Gulf Pro League and Hazfi Cup, so the Iran Football Association announced them as the 2019 Super Cup winner.

=== AFC Champions League ===
==== Group stage ====
| Pos | Team | Pld | W | D | L | GF | GA | GD | Pts | Qualification | PRS | TAW | DUH | SHJ |
|---|---|---|---|---|---|---|---|---|---|---|---|---|---|---|
| 1 | (Iran) Persepolis | 6 | 3 | 1 | 2 | 8 | 5 | +3 | 10 | Advance to knockout stage | — | 1–0 | 0–1 | 4–0 |
| 2 | (Saudi Arabia) Al-Taawoun | 6 | 3 | 0 | 3 | 4 | 8 | −4 | 9 (Note: Head-to-head points: Al-Taawoun 6, Al-Duhail 0.) | Advance to knockout stage | 0–1 | — | 2–0 | 0–6 |
| 3 | (Qatar) Al-Duhail | 6 | 3 | 0 | 3 | 7 | 8 | −1 | 9 | | 2–0 | 0–1 | — | 2–1 |
| 4 | (United Arab Emirates) Sharjah | 6 | 2 | 1 | 3 | 13 | 11 | +2 | 7 | | 2–2 | 0–1 | 4–2 | — |

Source: AFC
Rules for classification: Tiebreakers

==== Matches ====
Win Draw Loss Postponed

| Date Round | Home | Score | Away | Location |

| 11 February 2020 1 | Al-Duhail (Qatar) | 2–0 | (Iran) Persepolis | Doha, Qatar |
| 18:15 UTC+3 | Mandžukić 5'; Edmilson 13' | | | Stadium: Abdullah bin Khalifa Stadium; Attendance: 3,780; Referee: Aziz Asimov (Uzbekistan); Man of the Match: Mario Mandžukić (Al-Duhail) |

| 18 February 2020 2 | Sharjah (United Arab Emirates) | 2–2 | (Iran) Persepolis | Sharjah, United Arab Emirates |
| 19:35 UTC+4 | Khalfan 25'; Mendes 45+1' | | Alipour 10', 27' | Stadium: Sharjah Stadium; Attendance: 5,200; Referee: Chris Beath (Australia); Man of the Match: Ali Alipour (Persepolis) |

=== Friendly Matches ===
==== Pre-season ====
Win Draw Loss

| Date Round | Home | Score | Away | Location |

| 8 July 2019 1 | Persepolis | 2 – 1 | Niroo Zamini | Tehran |
| | Mohammad Amin Asadi 72'; Shoja' Khalilzadeh 80' | report | | Stadium: Shahid Kazemi Stadium |

| 24 July 2019 2 | Persepolis | 0 – 2 | Saipa | Tehran |
| | | report | | Stadium: Shahre Qods Stadium |

| 26 July 2019 3 | Persepolis | 4 – 0 | Niroo Zamini | Tehran |
| | Farshad Ahmadzadeh 23'; Ali Alipour 53'; Mehdi Torabi 57'; Amir Roostaei 85' | report | | Stadium: Shahre Qods Stadium |

| 31 July 2019 4 | Persepolis | 1 – 0 | Paykan | Tehran |
| | Shoja' Khalilzadeh 80' | report | | Stadium: Shahid Kazemi Stadium |

| 1 August 2019 5 | Persepolis | 2 – 0 | Naft MIS | Tehran |
| | Amir Roostaei 35'; Mehdi Abdi 66' | report | | Stadium: Shahid Kazemi Stadium |

| 7 August 2019 6 | Persepolis | 0 – 2 | Foolad | Tehran |
| | | | | Stadium: Shahid Kazemi Stadium |

| 8 August 2019 7 | Persepolis | 2 – 2 | Nassaji | Tehran |
| | | | | Stadium: Shahid Kazemi Stadium |

| 14 August 2019 8 | Persepolis | 2 – 1 | Gol Gohar | Tehran |
| | | | | Stadium: Kargaran Stadium |

==== During season ====
Win Draw Loss

| Date Round | Home | Score | Away | Location |

| 6 December 2019 1 | Persepolis | 6 – 3 | Shahrdari Tehran | Tehran |
| 11:10 DST +04:30 | Kamal Kamyabinia 15'; Farshad Ahmadzadeh 22'; Amir Roostaei 45'; Mehdi Abdi 49'; Saeid Hosseinpour 60', 89' | Report | | Stadium: Shahid Kazemi Stadium |

| 15 December 2019 2 | Persepolis | 3–3 | Sorkhpooshan Pakdasht | Tehran |
| 11:10 DST +04:30 | | Report | | Stadium: Shahid Kazemi Stadium |

| 28 December 2019 3 | Persepolis | 4–1 | Chooka Talesh | Tehran |
| 11:10 DST +04:30 | | Report | | Stadium: Shahid Kazemi Stadium |

| 12 February 2020 4 | Persepolis | 8–0 | (Qatar) Al-Shahania | Doha, Qatar |
| | Omid Alishah 17'; Christian Osaguona 19'; Mehdi Abdi 20'; Saeid Hosseinpour 35', 65'; Anthony Stokes 62'; Amir Roostaei 70' | Report | | Stadium: Al Sadd SC Stadium |

== Statistics ==
=== Scorers ===
| Rank | No | N | P | Name | PGPL | Hazfi Cup | 2020 ACL | Total |
|---|---|---|---|---|---|---|---|---|
| 1 | 70 | (Iran) | FW | Ali Alipour | 12 | 3 | 2 | 17 |
| 2 | 9 | (Iran) | FW | Mehdi Torabi | 11 | 1 | 0 | 12 |
| 3 | 19 | (Iran) | MF | Vahid Amiri | 6 | 1 | 0 | 7 |
| 4 | 16 | (Iran) | FW | Mehdi Abdi | 4 | 0 | 0 | 4 |
| 4 | 8 | (Iran) | MF | Ahmad Nourollahi | 4 | 0 | 0 | 4 |
| 4 | 5 | (Iraq) | FW | Bashar Resan | 2 | 1 | 1 | 4 |
| 5 | 3 | (Iran) | DF | Shoja' Khalilzadeh | 1 | 0 | 1 | 2 |
| 6 | 99 | (Nigeria) | FW | Christian Osaguona | 1 | 0 | 0 | 1 |
| 6 | 6 | (Iran) | CB | Hossein Kanaanizadegan | 1 | 0 | 0 | 1 |
| 6 | 88 | (Iran) | DF | Siamak Nemati | 1 | 0 | 0 | 1 |
| Others | | | | | 3 | 0 | 0 | 3 |
| Total | | | | | 46 | 6 | 4 | 56 |
Last updated: 18 September 2020

=== Assists ===
| Rank | No | N | P | Name | PGPL | Hazfi Cup | 2020 ACL | Total |
|---|---|---|---|---|---|---|---|---|
| 1 | 9 | (Iran) | FW | Mehdi Torabi | 6 | 1 | 2 | 9 |
| 2 | 70 | (Iran) | FW | Ali Alipour | 5 | 0 | 0 | 5 |
| 2 | 19 | (Iran) | MF | Vahid Amiri | 4 | 1 | 0 | 5 |
| 3 | 5 | (Iraq) | FW | Bashar Resan | 3 | 1 | 0 | 4 |
| 3 | 88 | (Iran) | MF | Siamak Nemati | 4 | 0 | 0 | 4 |
| 5 | 17 | (Iran) | MF | Mehdi Shiri | 2 | 0 | 0 | 2 |
| 5 | 2 | (Iran) | MF | Omid Alishah | 2 | 0 | 0 | 2 |
| 5 | 28 | (Iran) | LB | Mohammad Naderi | 2 | 0 | 0 | 2 |
| 8 | 99 | (Nigeria) | FW | Christian Osaguona | 1 | 0 | 0 | 1 |
| 8 | 18 | (Iran) | DM | Mohsen Rabiekhah | 0 | 1 | 0 | 1 |
| 8 | 8 | (Iran) | MF | Ahmad Nourollahi | 1 | 0 | 0 | 1 |
| 8 | 10 | (Iran) | MF | Farshad Ahmadzadeh | 1 | 0 | 0 | 1 |
| Total | | | | | 30 | 4 | 2 | 36 |
Last updated: 22 August 2020

=== Goalkeeping ===
| | | | | PGPL | | | Hazfi Cup | | | 2020 ACL | | | Total | | |
| Rank | No | N | Name | M | GA | CS | M | GA | CS | M | GA | CS | M | GA | CS |
|---|---|---|---|---|---|---|---|---|---|---|---|---|---|---|---|
| 1 | 44 | (Croatia) | Božidar Radošević | 15 | 7 | 10 | 1 | 0 | 1 | 0 | 0 | 0 | 16 | 7 | 11 |
| 2 | 1 | (Iran) | Alireza Beiranvand | 14 | 10 | 6 | 2 | 0 | 2 | 2 | 4 | 0 | 18 | 14 | 8 |
| 3 | 63 | (Iran) | Amirhossein Bayat | 0 | 0 | 0 | 0 | 0 | 0 | 0 | 0 | 0 | 0 | 0 | 0 |
| 3 | 12 | (Iran) | Sasan Zamaneh | 0 | 0 | 0 | 0 | 0 | 0 | 0 | 0 | 0 | 0 | 0 | 0 |
| Total | | | | 29 | 17 | 17 | 3 | 0 | 3 | 2 | 4 | 0 | 34 | 21 | 20 |
Last updated: 22 August 2020

=== Disciplinary record ===
| | | | | PGPL | | | Hazfi Cup | | | 2020 ACL | | | Total | | |
| No | P | N | Name | Yellow card | Double yellow card | Red card | Yellow card | Double yellow card | Red card | Yellow card | Double yellow card | Red card | Yellow card | Double yellow card | Red card |
|---|---|---|---|---|---|---|---|---|---|---|---|---|---|---|---|
| 1 | GK | (Iran) | Alireza Beiranvand | 2 | 0 | 0 | 0 | 0 | 0 | 0 | 0 | 0 | 2 | 0 | 0 |
| 3 | DF | (Iran) | Shoja' Khalilzadeh | 4 | 0 | 0 | 0 | 0 | 0 | 0 | 0 | 0 | 4 | 0 | 0 |
| 4 | DF | (Iran) | Jalal Hosseini | 1 | 0 | 0 | 0 | 0 | 0 | 0 | 0 | 0 | 1 | 0 | 0 |
| Total | | | | 0 | 0 | 0 | 0 | 0 | 0 | 0 | 0 | 0 | 0 | 0 | 0 |

Last updated: 30 March 2018.
Source: Competitive matches

== Awards ==
=== Team ===
| Award | Date | Source |

=== Player ===
| No. | Player | Award | Month | Source |

== Club ==
=== Kit ===
Supplier: (Germany) Uhlsport

| First half season: Home Kit / Away Kit | Second half season: Home Kit / Away Kit | Derby 92 and 2020 ACL: Home Kit / Away Kit |

=== Sponsorship ===
- Main sponsor: Tourism Bank
- Other sponsors: Irancell
  - Bonmano coffee
- Official shirt manufacturer: Uhlsport
