= Saeed Alhoei =

Iranian professional football coach and former player (born 1982)

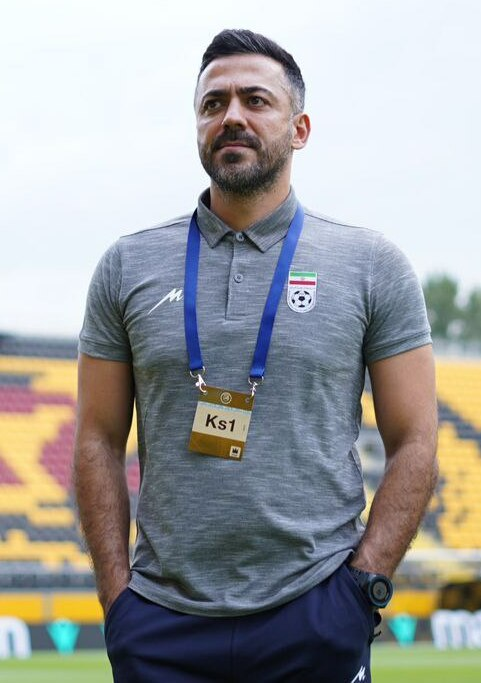
- Saeed Alhoei

Personal information
- Full name: Saeed Alhoei
- Date of birth: 15 December 1982 (age 43)
- Place of birth: Tehran, Iran
- Height: 1.82 m (6 ft 0 in)
- Position: Midfielder

Team information
- Current team: Iran National Football Team (Assistant)

Youth career
- Years: Team
- 1999-2000: Esteghlal Novin Tehran Under-19
- 2000–2001: Saipa Under-19
- 2001–2002: Saipa Under-21
- 2002–2003: Bargh Tehran Under-21

Managerial career
- 2009–2011: Moghavemat Tehran
- 2011–2013: Albadr Hormozgan
- 2013–2014: Iran U-23 (Assistant)
- 2015–2017: Tractor (Assistant)
- 2017–2018: Zob Ahan (Assistant)
- 2018–2020: Sepahan (Assistant)
- 2020–2023: Gol Gohar (First Assistant)
- 2023: Gol Gohar
- 2023–: Iran (Assistant)

Saeed Alhoei (Professional Football Coach) (Persian: سعید الهویی; born 15 December 1982 in Tehran, Iran) is an Iranian professional football coach and former player. He currently serves as an assistant coach to Amir Ghalenoei on the technical staff of the Iran national football team.

Alhoei holds a PhD in sport physiology and also possesses the AFC A Coaching Licence issued by the Asian Football Confederation. He also obtained the A degree of Asian coaching and the A2 degree of Asian bodybuilding. He began his professional coaching career in the late 2000s.

Alhoei joined the coaching staff of Tractor S.C. during the 2015–2016 season, concurrent with Ghalenoei’s appointment as head coach. He subsequently worked alongside Ghalenoei as an assistant coach at Zob Ahan Isfahan, Sepahan Isfahan, and Gol Gohar Sirjan, as well as with the Iran national football team.

Following Ghalenoei’s appointment as head coach of the Iran national team, Alhoei was appointed head coach of Gol Gohar Sirjan from 16 March 2023 until the end of the 2022–2023 season.

== Media and academic activities ==
In addition to his coaching career, Alhoei has appeared in a technical capacity on football-related television programs in Iran and has collaborated with sports media outlets and news agencies. He has also participated as a speaker at academic seminars and scientific conferences related to sport. In 2023, Alhoei appeared as a speaker at the first seminar on modern football physiology, alongside Álvarez Gil, physiologist of Pep Guardiola at Manchester City FC.

Alhoei has been involved in the preparation of books and articles related to training science and football analysis. In 2011, in collaboration with Mojtaba Taghavi, he compiled the reference book 2010 FIFA World Cup, under the sponsorship of Saipa Football Club. The book is organized into four sections—match analysis, team analysis, tournament analysis, and an image gallery—and includes technical analyses of matches and teams, as well as contributions from Iranian football experts.

He has also served as the scientific editor of the book Strength, Speed, and Power in Football, published by Hatmi Publications.

== Club career ==
Saeed Alhoei began his football career in 1999 with the youth team of Esteghlal Novin Tehran. In 2000, he joined the youth team of Saipa, and in 2001 he was promoted to Saipa’s under-21 team, where he spent one season. In 2002, he joined the under-21 team of Bargh Tehran, but later that year his professional football career came to an end due to a knee injury.

Alhoei played as a central midfielder and competed in the Tehran Premier League at various youth levels, from under-19 to under-21.

== Coaching career ==
=== Early coaching career: Moghavemat Tehran and Albadr Hormozgan (2009–2013) ===
Alhoei began his coaching career in 2009 with Moghavemat Tehran, competing in the Iranian Second Division, the third tier of Iranian football. After two and a half seasons with the club, he joined Albadr Hormozgan during the second half of the 2011–2012 season as first assistant coach to Mohammad Rabiei, with the team competing in the same league.

In the 2012–2013 season, Alhoei helped Albadr Hormozgan achieve a runner-up finish in Group B of the Second Division, securing promotion to the Azadegan League, the second tier of Iranian football.

=== Iran National Under-23 Football Team (2013–2014) ===
In 2013, following the appointment of Human Afazeli as head coach of the Iran national under-23 football team, Alhoei joined the coaching staff as a coach and tactical analyst. He held this position during the 2013 AFC U-22 Championship hosted in Muscat, Oman, where Iran was drawn in a group with Japan, Australia, and Kuwait.

Following a change in the coaching staff and the appointment of Nelo Vingada as head coach, Alhoei continued his role with the team and was part of the coaching staff during the 2014 Asian Games in Incheon, South Korea.

At the same time, he served as head of the technical studies department and a member of the technical committee of Saipa Football Club, competing in the Iran Pro League, the top tier of Iranian football.

=== Shahrdari Ardabil (Second half of 2015–First half of 2016) ===
After the conclusion of the 2014 Asian Games in Incheon, Alhoei joined the coaching staff of Shahrdari Ardabil in the Azadegan League, the second tier of Iranian football, during the second half of the 2014–2015 season, marking his second collaboration with Mohammad Rabiei. The team finished sixth at the end of the season.

Alhoei continued to serve as first assistant coach and team coach of Shahrdari Ardabil until the first half of the 2015–2016 season.

=== Tractor Tabriz (Second half of 2015–2016 to end of 2016–2017) ===
After gaining experience with various club and national teams, Alhoei joined the coaching staff of Tractor S.C. during the second half of the 2015–2016 season, four matches after Amir Ghalenoei was appointed head coach. He served as an assistant coach, participating in the planning and execution of training sessions.

In the 2015–2016 season, Tractor began the season under António Oliveira, but from the 14th week the team was managed by Ghalenoei and his staff, finishing fourth in the Iran Pro League. In the same season, Tractor qualified for the knockout stage of the AFC Champions League for the first time in the club's history, finishing first in Group C, ahead of Al Hilal of Saudi Arabia, and progressed to the Round of 16 of the 2016 AFC Champions League.

In the 2016–2017 season, Tractor reached the final of the Hazfi Cup under Ghalenoei and his staff, but lost 1–0 to Naft Tehran. The team also finished third in the Iran Pro League, securing direct qualification for the 2018 AFC Champions League.

=== Zob Ahan Esfahan (2017–2018) ===
In the 2017–2018 season, Amir Ghalenoei was appointed head coach of Zob Ahan on a one-year contract, following the decision of Saeed Azari, the club's CEO at the time, and the board of directors. Due to their previous collaboration at Tractor S.C., Ghalenoei and Alhoei continued their professional partnership at Zob Ahan.

Despite being in mid-table positions at various points during the season, Zob Ahan finished the 17th Iran Pro League season as runners-up, behind Persepolis and ahead of Esteghlal Tehran, securing a place in the play-off round of the 2019 AFC Champions League.

In the 2018 AFC Champions League, Zob Ahan, under Ghalenoei and his coaching staff, advanced from the play-off round to the group stage, finishing second in Group B and progressing to the Round of 16. They faced Esteghlal Tehran in this round and were eliminated after losing 3–2 on aggregate.

During the season, Alhoei served as assistant coach in 40 matches for Zob Ahan.

=== Sepahan Esfahan (2018–2019 and 2019–2020) ===
==== 2018-2019 Season ====
Following Zob Ahan’s successful results in the 2017–2018 season, Amir Ghalenoei joined Sepahan Isfahan on 22 May 2018. With his arrival, a third period of collaboration between Ghalenoei and Alhoei began. During the 2018–2019 season, Alhoei served as second assistant coach to Ghalenoei, following Miguel Teixeira, and worked alongside coaches including Jalal Omidian and Rui Tavares (goalkeeping coach) as part of Sepahan’s technical staff.

The coaching staff took charge of Sepahan after the club had recorded a poor performance in the 2017–2018 season, finishing 14th in the 16-team Iran Pro League. Under the new technical staff, Sepahan finished the 2018–2019 season as runners-up, ahead of Esteghlal Tehran and Shahr Khodro Mashhad, securing direct qualification for the 2020 AFC Champions League.

During the same season, Sepahan scored 46 goals, recording the best attacking record of the 18th Iran Pro League. The team also reached the semi-finals of the Hazfi Cup, but were eliminated after a 1–0 defeat to Persepolis Tehran.

==== 2019-2020 Season ====
In the 2019–2020 season., Sepahan continued under the management of Ghalenoei and his coaching staff in the Iran Pro League. At the end of the first half of the season, after spending eight weeks at the top of the table and suffering only one defeat, Sepahan ranked second, behind Persepolis. However, the team was unable to maintain its form in the second half of the season and ultimately finished fifth in the league standings.

With two matches remaining in the season, Ghalenoei resigned following a 2–0 defeat to Esteghlal Tehran in the quarter-finals of the Hazfi Cup. In the final two league matches, Miguel Teixeira, Ghalenoei’s first assistant, took charge of the team. Unlike the other members of the coaching staff, Alhoei did not accompany the team in the final two matches and departed Sepahan at the same time as Ghalenoei.

=== Gol Gohar Sirjan (2020–2021, 2021–2022, and 2022–2023) ===
==== 2020-2021 Season ====
In September 2020, Amir Ghalenoei was appointed head coach of Gol Gohar Sirjan following a decision by the club's management.

With Ghalenoei’s arrival, Alhoei joined the coaching staff as first assistant coach, taking responsibility for areas including technical management, training planning, and oversight of training implementation.

The collaboration between Ghalenoei and Alhoei during the 2020–2021 season resulted in Gol Gohar finishing fifth in the Iran Pro League. The team was level on points with Tractor S.C. and ranked fifth only due to an inferior goal difference. This result was achieved in Gol Gohar’s second season in the top flight, having finished 10th in the 2019–2020 season. During the season, Gol Gohar spent a total of six weeks at the top of the league table.

In the same season, Gol Gohar reached the semi-finals of the Hazfi Cup, but were eliminated following a 2–1 defeat to Esteghlal Tehran.

==== 2021-2022 Season ====
Due to the club's positive results in the 2020–2021 season, Gol Gohar extended the contracts of Ghalenoei and his coaching staff for an additional year. In the 2021–2022 season, the team began the campaign with strong performances under Ghalenoei and his staff. However, following a ruling by the Iran Football Federation Disciplinary Committee, later upheld by the Appeals Committee, regarding the ineligible use of Gabonese player Eric Bagnama, Gol Gohar’s matches against Sepahan, Paykan, and Tractor were each recorded as 3–0 losses, resulting in a seven-point deduction midway through the season. Despite the points deduction, Gol Gohar finished the 2021–2022 season in fourth place, which marked the club's highest league finish since being promoted to the Iran Pro League.

==== 2022-2023 Season ====
Gol Gohar’s fourth-place finish in the 2021–2022 season led to Ghalenoei and his coaching staff remaining at the club for the 2022–2023 season. Consequently, the collaboration between Ghalenoei and Alhoei at Gol Gohar continued for a third consecutive season, with the team positioned fourth in the league table after 23 matchweeks. On 12 March 2023, Amir Ghalenoei was appointed head coach of the Iran national football team. Following his departure from Gol Gohar, Alhoei was appointed head coach of the club until the end of the season.

Concurrent with Ghalenoei’s appointment to the national team, Alhoei led Iran's national team training sessions during the April 2023 training camp, held during the Iran Pro League’s mid-season break. Alhoei departed Gol Gohar at the end of the 2022–2023 season, after the club finished sixth in the league.

=== Iran national football team (2023–present) ===
Following the conclusion of the 2022–2023 season, Alhoei rejoined Amir Ghalenoei as an assistant coach and training planner on the technical staff of the Iran national football team. During this period, the national team's coaching staff included Antonio Manicone (former assistant coach of Vladimir Petković with the Switzerland national team), Alin Dincă (goalkeeping coach), Rahman Rezaei, Andranik Teymourian, Hamid Motahari, and Ali-Asghar Ghorbanalipour (coach and fitness trainer).

Concurrent with the start of his full-time role with the national team, Alhoei explained in a television program the player selection methodology used by the coaching staff. He stated that the staff employ an analytical matrix combining artificial intelligence–derived data with technical evaluations by the coaching staff to assess players. In this approach, players are categorized into different layers of the matrix based on their performance during the previous season, after which the data are integrated with factors such as age and the playing style of the national team to reach final decisions regarding national team call-ups.

Under the management of Ghalenoei, with Alhoei serving as assistant coach, Iran won the inaugural CAFA Nations Cup, held in June 2023, after defeating host nation Uzbekistan in the final.

In October 2023, Iran participated in a four-nation tournament in Jordan, alongside the national teams of Jordan, Qatar, and Iraq. In October 2023, Iran defeated Jordan 3–1 in the semi-final and Qatar 4–0 in the final to claim the tournament title.

In January 2024, Iran competed in the 2023 AFC Asian Cup and, under Ghalenoei and his coaching staff, advanced to the semi-finals of the tournament. Iran were eliminated at this stage after a 3–2 defeat to host nation Qatar, missing out on qualification for the final.

Following the conclusion of the Asian Cup, the national team's coaching staff were retained, and Alhoei continued his role as assistant coach. In the third round of the 2026 FIFA World Cup qualification (AFC), Iran topped Group A with 23 points, finishing ahead of Uzbekistan, the United Arab Emirates, and Qatar, and qualified for the FIFA World Cup. Iran secured qualification after a 2–2 draw against Uzbekistan on 25 March 2025, becoming the third team, after Japan and New Zealand, to qualify for the tournament.

In September 2025, Iran took part in the second edition of the CAFA Nations Cup, finishing as runners-up after a 1–0 defeat to Uzbekistan in the final.

In November 2025, Iran also competed in the Al Ain International Tournament in the United Arab Emirates, featuring Iran, Egypt, Cape Verde, and Uzbekistan, and finished second after losing to Uzbekistan on penalty kicks following a draw in regulation time in the final.

== Honours (as coach) ==
=== Albadr Hormozgan ===
Runner-up, Iranian Second Division, and promotion to the Azadegan League: 2012–2013

=== Tractor Tabriz ===
Qualification for the knockout stage of the AFC Champions League: 2016 (first time in the club's history)

Third place, Iran Pro League, and direct qualification for the 2018 AFC Champions League: 2016–2017

Runner-up, Hazfi Cup: 2016–2017

=== Zob Ahan Esfahan ===
Runner-up, Iran Pro League, and qualification for the 2019 AFC Champions League play-off round: 2017–2018

Qualification for the Round of 16 of the AFC Champions League: 2018

=== Sepahan Esfahan ===
Runner-up, Iran Pro League, and direct qualification for the 2020 AFC Champions League: 2018–2019

Semi-finalist, Hazfi Cup: 2018–2019

=== Gol Gohar Sirjan ===
Semi-finalist, Hazfi Cup: 2020–2021

Fourth place, Iran Pro League (club's highest league finish): 2021–2022

=== Iran National Football Team ===
Winners, CAFA Nations Cup: June 2023

Winners, Jordan Four-Nation International Tournament: October 2023

Semi-finalists, AFC Asian Cup: 2023

Qualification for the 2026 FIFA World Cup as Group A winners, third round of AFC qualifiers

Runners-up, CAFA Nations Cup: September 2025

Runners-up, Al Ain International Tournament (United Arab Emirates): November 2025
