= 2019–20 Persian Gulf Pro League =

19th season of Persian Gulf Pro League

Persian Gulf Pro League
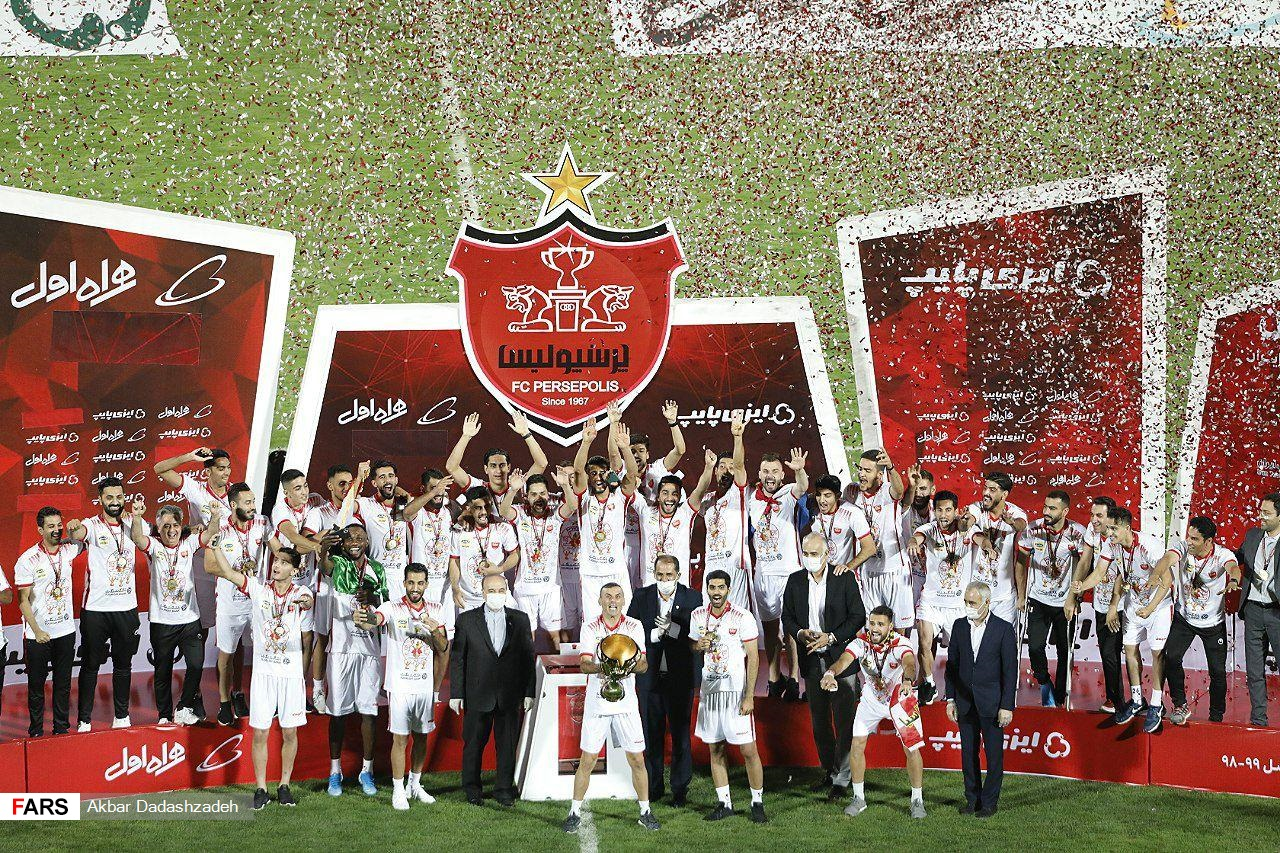
- Season: 2019–20
- Dates: 23 August 2019 – 20 August 2020
- Champions: Persepolis; 6th Pro League title 13th Iranian title
- Relegated: Pars Jonoubi; Shahin Bushehr
- Champions League: Persepolis; Esteghlal; Foolad; Tractor
- Matches: 240
- Goals: 503 (2.1 per match)
- Top goalscorer: Cheick Diabaté (15 goals)
- Best goalkeeper: Payam Niazmand (15 clean sheets)
- Biggest home win: Esteghlal 5–0 Sanat Naft (5 November 2019); Sepahan 5–0 Shahin (19 December 2019)
- Biggest away win: Shahin 0–5 Persepolis (25 October 2019)
- Highest scoring: Paykan 6–2 Machine Sazi (20 September 2019)
- Longest winning run: Persepolis (7 matches, 2 times)
- Longest unbeaten run: Persepolis (16 matches)
- Longest winless run: Shahin Bushehr (17 matches)
- Longest losing run: Shahin Bushehr (6 matches)
- Highest attendance: 80,000; Tractor 2–4 Esteghlal (1 November 2019)
- Lowest attendance: 100; Machine Sazi 4–2 Shahin Bushehr (26 September 2019)
- Total attendance: 1,320,200
- Average attendance: 8,629

The 2019–20 Persian Gulf Pro League (formerly known as Iran Pro League) was the 37th season of Iran's Football League and 19th as Persian Gulf Pro League since its establishment in 2001. Persepolis were the defending champions and won their record-extending 4th consecutive title and 13th title overall (6th in the Pro League era) on 24 July with four games to spare. The season featured 14 teams from the 2018–19 Persian Gulf Pro League and two new teams promoted from the 2018–19 Azadegan League: Shahin Bushehr and Gol Gohar Sirjan.

== Effects of the 2019–20 coronavirus pandemic ==
Due to the ongoing COVID-19 pandemic in Iran, the Persian Gulf Pro League temporally suspended all matches from 11 March to 24 June 2020.

== Teams ==
=== Stadia and locations ===
Locations of clubs in 2019–20 Persian Gulf Pro League

Team	Location	Stadium	Capacity
Esteghlal	Tehran	Azadi	78,116
Foolad	Ahvaz	Foolad Arena	30,655
Gol Gohar Sirjan	Sirjan	Imam Ali	8,000
Machine Sazi	Tabriz	Qasem Soleimani	12,000
Naft Masjed Soleyman	Masjed Soleyman	Behnam Mohammadi	8,000
Nassaji Mazandaran	Qaem Shahr	Vatani	15,000
Pars Jonoubi Jam	Jam	Takhti Jam	15,000
Paykan	Shahr-e Qods	Shahre Qods	18,000
Persepolis	Tehran	Azadi	78,116
Saipa	Tehran	Dastgerdi	8,250
Sanat Naft	Abadan	Takhti Abadan	10,000
Sepahan	Isfahan	Naghsh-e-Jahan	75,000
Shahin Bushehr	Bushehr	Shahid Mahdavi	15,000
Shahr Khodro	Mashhad	Imam Reza	27,700
Tractor	Tabriz	Yadegar-e Emam	75,000
Zob Ahan	Fooladshahr	Fooladshahr	15,000

=== Personnel and kits ===
Note: Flags indicate national team as has been defined under FIFA eligibility rules. Players may hold more than one non-FIFA nationality.

Team	Manager	Captain	Kit manufacturer
Esteghlal	(Iran) Farhad Majidi	(Iran) Voria Ghafouri	(Germany) Uhlsport
Foolad	(Iran) Javad Nekounam	(Iran) Ayoub Vali	(Germany) Uhlsport
Gol Gohar	(Iran) Majid Jalali	(Iran) Mehran Golzari	(Iran) Merooj
Machine Sazi	(Iran) Human Afazeli	(Iran) Aziz Maeboodi	(Iran) Merooj
Naft MIS	(Iran) Mehdi Tartar	(Iran) Abbas Asgari	(Iran) Merooj
Nassaji	(Iran) Mahmoud Fekri	(Iran) Mohammad Abbaszadeh	(Iran) Merooj
Pars Jonoubi	(Iran) Sirous Pourmousavi	(Iran) Mohammad Nouri	(Germany) Uhlsport
Paykan	(Iran) Abdollah Veisi	(Iran) Ali Hamoudi	(Iran) Yousef Jame
Persepolis	(Iran) Yahya Golmohammadi	(Iran) Jalal Hosseini	(Germany) Uhlsport
Saipa	(Iran) Ebrahim Sadeghi	(Iran) Roozbeh Shahalidoost	(Iran) Start
Sanat Naft	(Iran) Behnam Seraj	(Iran) Hossein Baghlani	(Iran) Merooj
Sepahan	(Portugal) Miguel Teixeira (caretaker)	(Iran) Rasoul Navidkia	(Germany) Uhlsport
Shahin Bushehr	(Iran) Mehdi Pashazadeh	(Iran) Milad Saremi	(Germany) Uhlsport
Shahr Khodro	(Iran) Sohrab Bakhtiarizadeh	(Iran) Reza Nasehi	(Germany) Uhlsport
Tractor	(Iran) Saket Elhami	(Iran) Masoud Shojaei	(Germany) Adidas
Zob Ahan	(Croatia) Luka Bonačić	(Iran) Ghasem Haddadifar	(Iran) Talash

== Managerial changes ==
Team	Outgoing head coach	Manner of departure	Date of vacancy	Position in table	Incoming head coach	Date of appointment
Nassaji	(Iran) Majid Jalali	Resigned	17 May 2019	Pre-season	(Iran) Mohammad Reza Mohajeri	20 June 2019
Sanat Naft	(Portugal) Paulo Sérgio	Signed with Al-Taawoun	22 May 2019	Pre-season	(Croatia) Dragan Skočić	1 July 2019
Foolad	(Iran) (United States) Afshin Ghotbi	Contract expired	1 June 2019	Pre-season	(Iran) Javad Nekounam	1 June 2019
Tractor	(Belgium) Georges Leekens	Contract expired	1 June 2019	Pre-season	(Turkey) Mustafa Denizli	13 June 2019
Pars Jonoubi Jam	(Iran) Mehdi Tartar	Contract expired	1 June 2019	Pre-season	(Iran) Faraz Kamalvand	8 June 2019
Naft MIS	(Iran) Firouz Karimi	Contract expired	1 June 2019	Pre-season	(Iran) Mehdi Tartar	29 June 2019
Esteghlal	(Iran) Farhad Majidi	End of caretaker role	10 June 2019	Pre-season	(Italy) Andrea Stramaccioni	13 June 2019
Machine Sazi	(Iran) Mohammad Reza Mohajeri	Mutual Consent	15 June 2019	Pre-season	(Iran) Rasoul Khatibi	15 June 2019
Persepolis	(Croatia) Branko Ivanković	Signed with Al-Ahli	19 June 2019	Pre-season	(Argentina) Gabriel Calderón	1 July 2019
Gol Gohar Sirjan	(Croatia) Vinko Begović	Sacked	4 October 2019	15th	(Iran) Majid Jalali	16 October 2019
Shahin Bushehr	(Iran) Abdollah Veisi	Resigned	10 October 2019	16th	(Croatia) Mišo Krstičević	12 November 2019
Esteghlal	(Italy) Andrea Stramaccioni	Resigned	6 December 2019	1st	(Iran) Farhad Majidi	2 January 2020
Tractor	(Turkey) Mustafa Denizli	Sacked	7 December 2019	8th	(Iran) Saket Elhami	10 December 2019
Pars Jonoubi Jam	(Iran) Faraz Kamalvand	Resigned	14 December 2019	13th	(Iran) Human Afazeli	28 December 2019
Zob Ahan	(Iran) Alireza Mansourian	Mutual Consent	18 December 2019	11th	(Montenegro) Miodrag Radulović	14 January 2020
Machine Sazi	(Iran) Rasoul Khatibi	Signed with Aluminium	3 January 2020	9th	(Iran) Ahad Sheykhlari	6 January 2020
Persepolis	(Argentina) Gabriel Calderón	Resigned	12 January 2020	1st	(Iran) Yahya Golmohammadi	13 January 2020
Shahr Khodro	(Iran) Yahya Golmohammadi	Signed with Persepolis	13 January 2020	6th	(Iran) Mojtaba Sarasiaei (Italy) Stefano Cusin ^{1}	14 January 2020
Paykan	(Iran) Hossein Faraki	Resigned	31 January 2020	14th	(Iran) Abdollah Veisi	4 February 2020
Sanat Naft	(Croatia) Dragan Skočić	Signed with Iran national football team	6 February 2020	6th	(Iran) Behnam Seraj	16 February 2020
Nassaji	(Iran) Mohammad Reza Mohajeri	Resigned	22 February 2020	11th	(Iran) Mahmoud Fekri	25 February 2020
Zob Ahan	(Montenegro) Miodrag Radulović	Mutual Consent	17 June 2020	11th	(Croatia) Luka Bonačić	24 June 2020
Shahin Bushehr	(Croatia) Mišo Krstičević	Resigned	30 June 2020	15th	(Iran) Mehdi Pashazadeh	14 July 2020
Machine Sazi	(Iran) Ahad Sheykhlari	Resigned	1 July 2020	10th	(Iran) Mohammad Reza Mohajeri	1 July 2020
Shahr Khodro	(Iran) Mojtaba Sarasiaei	Resigned	8 July 2020	3rd	(Iran) Sohrab Bakhtiarizadeh	14 July 2020
Machine Sazi	(Iran) Mohammad Reza Mohajeri	Resigned	13 July 2020	10th	(Iran) Human Afazeli	15 July 2020
Pars Jonoubi Jam	(Iran) Human Afazeli	Resigned	15 July 2019	13th	(Iran) Sirous Pourmousavi	16 July 2019
Sepahan	(Iran) Amir Ghalenoei	Resigned	2 August 2020	5th	(Portugal) Miguel Teixeira (Caretaker)	2 August 2020

1. Cusin became the official co-manager because Sarasiaei did not have AFC A-Licence.

== Foreign players ==
The number of foreign players is restricted to four per Persian Gulf Pro League team, including a slot for a player from AFC countries. A team can use four foreign players on the field in each game, including at least one player from the AFC country.
In bold: Players that have been capped for their national team.

Club	Player 1	Player 2	Player 3	Asian Player	Former Players
Esteghlal	(Croatia) **Hrvoje Milić**	(Mali) **Cheick Diabaté**			(Bulgaria) **Nikolay Bodurov**
Foolad	(Brazil) Chimba	(Mali) Moussa Coulibaly	(South Africa) **Ayanda Patosi**		(Jordan) **Anas Bani Yaseen**
Gol Gohar Sirjan	(Nigeria) Godwin Mensha				(Brazil) Jefferson Tavares (Netherlands) Kevin Jansen (Montenegro) Uroš Delić
Machine Sazi	(Brazil) Eduardo Mancha				(Brazil) Jefferson de Jesus
Naft MIS					
Nassaji					
Pars Jonoubi Jam	(Brazil) Fernando de Jesus	(Brazil) Magno Batista	(Georgia (country)) Kakhaber Kakashvili		
Paykan	(Armenia) **Aram Ayrapetyan**				(Montenegro) **Marko Vukčević**
Persepolis	(Croatia) Božidar Radošević	(Republic of Ireland) **Anthony Stokes**	(Nigeria) **Christian Osaguona**	(Iraq) **Bashar Resan**	(Brazil) Júnior Brandão
Saipa					
Sanat Naft					
Sepahan	(Brazil) Kiros	(Georgia (country)) **Giorgi Gvelesiani**	(Hungary) **Vladimir Koman**	(Oman) **Muhsen Al-Ghassani**	
Shahin Bushehr	(Georgia (country)) Maksime Kvilitaia	(Georgia (country)) Luka Gadrani			
Shahr Khodro					(Nicaragua) Carlos Chavarría (Ukraine) Myroslav Slavov
Tractor	(Algeria) Okacha Hamzaoui	(Brazil) Yuri Matias	(Peru) Willyan Mimbela		(Brazil) Mazola (Martinique) Kévin Fortuné (Japan) Yukiya Sugita
Zob Ahan	(Serbia) Darko Bjedov	(Serbia) Ivan Marković		(Lebanon) **Mehdi Khalil**	(Nigeria) **Ebiabowei Baker** (Nigeria) Macauley Chrisantus

== League table ==
Pos	Team	Pld	W	D	L	GF	GA	GD	Pts	Qualification or relegation
1	Persepolis (C)	30	21	4	5	46	17	+29	67	Qualification for 2021 AFC Champions League group stage
2	Esteghlal	30	14	11	5	55	31	+24	53	Qualification for 2021 AFC Champions League group stage
3	Foolad	30	14	9	7	28	19	+9	51	Qualification for 2021 AFC Champions League qualifying play-offs
4	Tractor	30	14	8	8	31	23	+8	50	Qualification for 2021 AFC Champions League group stage (Note: Tractor qualified to AFC Champions League group stage directly by winning the Hazfi Cup)
5	Sepahan	30	12	13	5	39	22	+17	49	
6	Shahr Khodro	30	12	10	8	27	25	+2	46	
7	Sanat Naft	30	11	8	11	29	33	−4	41	
8	Naft Masjed Soleyman	30	7	17	6	24	22	+2	38	
9	Nassaji Mazandaran	30	8	14	8	30	32	−2	38	
10	Gol Gohar	30	7	12	11	27	34	−7	33	
11	Machine Sazi	30	8	7	15	28	40	−12	31	
12	Zob Ahan	30	7	9	14	31	39	−8	30	
13	Paykan	30	6	11	13	38	44	−6	29	
14	Saipa	30	5	14	11	24	35	−11	29	
15	Pars Jonoubi Jam (R)	30	4	15	11	20	30	−10	27	Relegation to 2020–21 Azadegan League
16	Shahin Bushehr (R)	30	4	10	16	26	57	−31	22	Relegation to 2020–21 Azadegan League

Source: IPL Table, Soccerway
Rules for classification: 1) Points; 2) Goal difference; 3) Goals scored.
(C) Champions; (R) Relegated

== Results ==
Home \ Away	EST	FOL	GOL	MST	MIS	NSJ	PJJ	PAY	PRS	SAP	SNA	SEP	SHB	SHK	TRC	ZOB
Esteghlal		1–1	2–1	1–2	2–1	1–1	2–0	1–1	0–1	1–1	5–0	2–1	4–1	1–0	0–0	2–1
Foolad	2–1		2–0	2–1	1–0	1–0	1–0	0–0	0–1	0–0	0–1	0–0	1–0	2–0	1–0	2–1
Gol Gohar	1–0	0–0		1–0	0–0	1–1	1–1	0–0	3–3	1–1	0–1	0–2	4–2	0–1	1–1	0–0
Machine Sazi	1–0	2–3	1–2		0–0	0–3	1–1	2–2	0–1	1–0	1–0	0–0	4–2	0–1	2–0	2–1
Naft MIS	1–1	0–0	2–3	1–0		0–0	1–0	1–1	1–2	2–1	2–0	0–0	1–0	1–1	0–0	0–0
Nassaji	1–2	3–2	1–0	0–0	0–0		0–0	4–3	1–1	1–3	0–0	2–2	2–0	0–0	0–4	0–0
Pars Jonoubi Jam	0–2	0–0	1–1	1–1	1–1	2–2		3–1	0–1	3–2	0–0	1–1	0–2	2–1	1–0	0–0
Paykan	2–2	1–2	2–0	6–2	2–3	0–1	0–0		1–3	1–0	1–0	1–1	1–3	0–2	2–3	2–1
Persepolis	2–2	1–0	2–1	0–0	0–1	1–0	1–0	2–1		3–0	1–0	0–2	1–0	3–1	2–0	0–1
Saipa	0–4	0–0	0–0	1–0	0–0	4–3	1–1	0–0	0–2		1–2	0–0	0–0	0–0	0–1	3–1
Sanat Naft	0–2	2–2	1–2	1–0	1–1	1–1	2–0	3–2	0–1	1–0		4–2	3–1	1–1	2–1	1–1
Sepahan	2–2	2–1	2–0	1–0	0–0	0–1	1–1	2–0	0–3	0–0	1–0		5–0	2–0	2–0	2–0
Shahin Bushehr	1–4	0–1	1–1	3–1	2–2	2–1	1–1	1–1	0–5	1–1	1–1	0–3		0–0	0–0	1–5
Shahr Khodro	2–2	0–1	1–0	3–1	2–1	0–0	1–0	1–0	1–0	1–1	0–1	1–1	2–1		0–0	2–1
Tractor	2–4	1–0	1–0	2–1	1–0	0–1	1–0	0–0	1–0	3–1	2–0	2–1	0–0	3–1		2–1
Zob Ahan	2–2	1–0	2–3	1–2	1–1	2–0	1–0	1–4	0–3	2–3	1–0	1–1	2–0	0–1	0–0	

Updated to match(es) played on 21 August 2020. Source: IPL Stats, Soccerway
Legend: Blue = home team win; Yellow = draw; Red = away team win.

=== Positions by round ===
Team ╲ Round	1	2	3	4	5	6	7	8	9	10	11	12	13	14	15	16	17	18	19	20	21	22	23	24	25	26	27	28	29	30
Persepolis	5	8	4	2	4	7	6	4	4	3	5	5	2	1	1	1	1	1	1	1	1	1	1	1	1	1	1	1	1	1
Esteghlal	12	12	11	15	14	11	8	7	7	4	3	3	1	2	2	5	5	4	4	3	4	5	4	5	2	2	2	2	2	2
Foolad	13	13	13	9	9	6	4	5	5	6	8	7	7	6	7	7	8	8	7	6	5	3	6	3	5	5	4	4	5	3
Tractor	10	6	5	4	2	2	2	3	3	5	4	4	5	9	8	3	3	3	3	2	3	6	5	6	3	4	3	3	3	4
Sepahan	1	1	2	3	1	1	1	2	2	2	2	1	4	3	3	2	2	2	2	4	2	2	2	2	4	3	5	5	4	5
Shahr Khodro	2	2	1	1	3	3	3	1	1	1	1	2	6	4	5	6	6	5	5	5	6	4	3	4	6	6	6	6	6	6
Sanat Naft	6	5	7	8	6	4	5	6	6	7	6	6	3	5	4	4	4	6	6	7	7	7	7	7	7	7	7	7	7	7
Naft MIS	9	10	9	11	12	8	7	8	8	8	7	8	8	7	6	8	7	7	8	8	8	8	8	8	8	8	8	9	9	8
Nassaji	8	3	6	5	5	5	9	9	9	11	11	12	11	12	12	10	10	10	12	11	10	9	9	9	9	9	9	8	8	9
Gol Gohar	7	9	8	13	15	15	15	15	15	15	15	15	15	15	15	15	15	15	15	14	13	14	14	15	15	13	13	11	11	10
Machine Sazi	4	7	10	14	10	10	11	11	11	10	10	9	9	8	9	9	9	9	9	9	9	10	10	10	10	10	11	13	14	11
Zob Ahan	11	11	12	12	13	14	14	14	14	14	12	11	12	10	10	11	11	12	10	10	11	11	11	11	12	12	12	10	10	12
Paykan	15	15	15	10	11	13	13	10	10	9	9	10	10	11	11	14	14	14	14	16	16	16	15	14	14	15	15	14	13	13
Saipa	3	4	3	6	7	9	12	12	12	12	13	13	13	13	14	13	12	11	11	12	14	13	12	12	13	14	10	12	12	14
Pars Jonoubi Jam	14	14	14	7	8	12	10	13	13	13	14	14	14	14	13	12	13	13	13	13	12	12	13	13	11	11	14	15	15	15
Shahin Bushehr	16	16	16	16	16	16	16	16	16	16	16	16	16	16	16	16	16	16	16	15	15	15	16	16	16	16	16	16	16	16

Leader : 2021 AFC Champions League Group stage
2021 AFC Champions League qualifying play-off round
Relegation to 2020-21 Azadegan League

Updated to match(es) played on 21 August 2020. Source: IPL Table

== Clubs season-progress ==
Team ╲ Round	1	2	3	4	5	6	7	8	9	10	11	12	13	14	15	16	17	18	19	20	21	22	23	24	25	26	27	28	29	30
Persepolis	W	L	W	W	L	L	W	W	D	W	L	W	W	W	W	W	W	W	D	W	W	W	W	W	W	W	D	L	D	W
Esteghlal	L	D	D	L	D	W	W	W	W	W	W	D	W	D	W	L	L	W	D	W	L	D	W	D	W	D	W	D	D	W
Foolad	L	D	D	W	D	W	W	W	D	L	L	W	D	W	L	D	W	L	W	W	W	W	L	W	L	W	D	D	D	W
Tractor	D	W	D	W	W	W	W	L	L	L	W	W	D	L	W	W	L	W	D	W	L	L	W	D	W	D	D	D	W	L
Sepahan	W	W	D	D	W	W	W	D	D	W	L	D	D	D	W	W	D	W	D	L	D	W	D	D	L	W	L	L	W	D
Shahr Khodro	W	W	W	L	D	W	W	W	D	W	L	L	L	D	D	W	D	W	L	W	L	W	W	D	L	D	D	D	L	D
Sanat Naft	W	D	L	D	W	W	D	W	D	L	W	W	W	D	W	D	L	L	L	L	W	W	L	D	L	L	D	L	W	L
Naft MIS	D	D	D	D	D	W	W	D	D	D	W	D	D	W	D	L	W	L	D	L	D	D	W	L	D	L	D	L	D	W
Nassaji	D	W	L	W	D	D	L	L	D	D	L	L	D	L	D	W	W	L	L	D	W	W	W	D	D	D	D	W	D	D
Gol Gohar	D	D	D	L	L	L	L	L	D	D	W	L	D	L	D	L	D	D	D	W	W	L	L	L	W	W	D	W	D	W
Machine Sazi	W	L	L	L	W	D	L	D	D	W	L	W	D	W	L	W	D	L	D	L	L	L	L	L	W	L	L	D	L	W
Zob Ahan	L	D	D	D	D	L	L	L	W	L	W	D	L	W	D	L	W	L	W	L	D	L	L	W	L	L	D	W	D	L
Paykan	L	L	D	W	D	L	L	W	D	W	L	L	L	D	L	L	L	L	D	L	D	L	W	W	D	D	D	W	D	D
Saipa	W	D	W	L	L	L	L	D	D	L	D	L	D	L	L	W	D	W	D	L	L	D	D	D	D	D	W	D	D	L
Pars Jonoubi Jam	L	D	D	W	D	L	D	L	D	L	W	D	D	L	D	L	L	D	D	D	W	L	L	D	W	D	L	D	D	L
Shahin Bushehr	L	L	D	L	L	L	L	L	L	D	D	D	D	D	L	L	D	W	W	W	L	D	L	L	L	D	W	D	L	L

Source: IranProLeague Stats
W = Win; D = Draw; L = Lose

== Season statistics ==
=== Top scorers ===
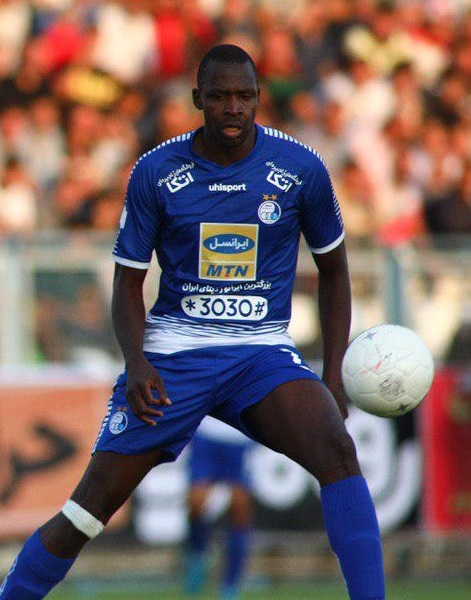
Cheick Diabaté

Rank	Player	Club	Goals
1	(Mali) Cheick Diabaté	Esteghlal	15
2	(Iran) Shahriar Moghanlou	Paykan	13
3	(Iran) Ali Alipour	Persepolis	12
3	(Iran) Issa Alekasir	Sanat Naft	12
5	(Iran) Mehdi Torabi	Persepolis	11
6	(Iran) Mehdi Ghaedi	Esteghlal	10
6	(Iran) Amir Arsalan Motahari	Zob Ahan / Esteghlal	10
8	(Iran) Younes Shakeri	Shahr Khodro / Gol Gohar	9
9	(Iran) Faraz Emamali	Paykan	8
9	(Iran) Hossein Maleki	Shahin Bushehr	8
9	(Iran) Mohammad Nouri	Pars Jonoubi	8
9	(Iran) Ahmad Reza Zendehrouh	Gol Gohar	8

=== Hat-tricks ===
Player	For	Against	Result	Date
(Iran) Ali Alipour	Persepolis	Shahin Bushehr	5–0 (A)	25 October 2019
(Mali) Cheick Diabaté	Esteghlal	Tractor	4–2 (A)	1 November 2019
(Brazil) Kiros Stanlley	Sepahan	Shahin Bushehr	5–0 (H)	19 December 2019

=== Clean sheets ===
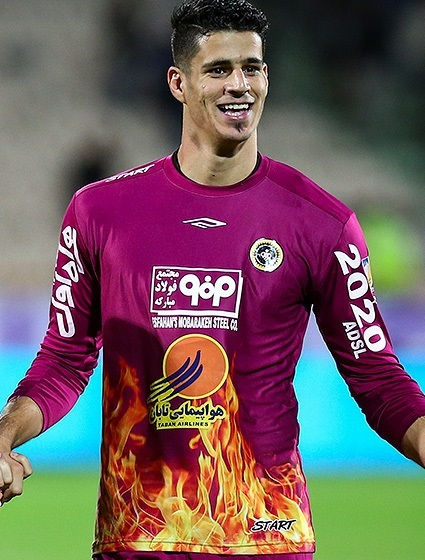
Payam Niazmand

Rank	Player	Club	Clean sheets
1	(Iran) Payam Niazmand	Sepahan	17
2	(Iran) Mohammad Rashid Mazaheri	Tractor	14
3	(Iran) Shahab Gordan	Foolad	13
4	(Iran) Mehdi Rahmati	Shahr Khodro	12
5	(Iran) Alireza Haghighi	Nassaji	11
6	(Croatia) Božidar Radošević	Persepolis	10
7	(Iran) Hossein Hosseini	Esteghlal	7
8	(Iran) Alireza Beiranvand	Persepolis	6
8	(Iran) Hamed Fallahzadeh	Saipa	6
8	(Iran) Milad Farahani	Gol Gohar	6
8	(Iran) Hamed Lak	Machine Sazi	6
8	(Iran) Sosha Makani	Naft MIS	6

== Attendances ==
=== Average home attendances ===
Pos	Team	Total	High	Low	Average	Change
1	Persepolis	248,000	57,000	8,000	27,556	−30.2%
2	Esteghlal	211,000	65,000	9,000	26,375	−7.3%
3	Tractor	219,000	80,000	2,000	21,900	−52.8%
4	Sepahan	172,000	45,000	7,000	19,111	−6.9%
5	Nassaji	79,000	15,000	3,000	7,182	−29.8%
6	Shahr Khodro	73,000	23,000	2,000	8,111	−42.2%
7	Sanat Naft	64,500	12,000	1,500	6,450	+97.4%
8	Foolad	47,000	25,000	1,000	5,875	−27.5%
9	Shahin Bushehr	41,000	10,000	2,000	4,100	−21.2%
10	Gol Gohar	40,500	5,000	2,000	4,050	+239.8%
11	Naft MSJ	32,000	6,000	1,000	3,556	−26.8%
12	Pars Jonoubi Jam	27,200	6,000	500	2,720	−40.1%
13	Zob Ahan	21,500	5,000	500	2,150	−22.7%
14	Saipa	18,300	8,000	200	1,830	−22.8%
15	Paykan	17,800	10,000	100	1,780	−16.9%
16	Mashin Sazi	8,400	4,000	100	840	−54.1%
	League total	1,320,200	80,000	100	8,629	−29.3%

Updated to games played on 23 February 2020
Notes:
Matches with spectator bans are not included in average attendances:
- Esteghlal, Naft MSJ and Persepolis each were fined one spectator ban match
- The matches between Esteghlal vs Zob Ahan and Shahr Khodro vs Naft MSJ played without spectators due to Coronavirus prevention
- The match between Sepahan and Persepolis was not played due to Sepahan's late arriving
Gol Gohar and Shahin Bushehr played last season in Azadegan League

=== Attendances by round ===
Team/Round	1	2	3	4	5	6	7	8	9	10	11	12	13	14	15	16	17	18	19	20	21	22	23	24	25	26	27	28	29	30	Average
Esteghlal	A	20000	A	57000	A	N	A	15000	A	20000	A	A	65000	A	10000	15000	P	9000	A	C	N/A	N/A	N/A	N/A	N/A	N/A	N/A	N/A	N/A	N/A	26375
Foolad	6000	A	5000	A	4000	A	A	2000	A	25000	A	1000	A	1000	A	A	P	A	3000	A	N/A	N/A	N/A	N/A	N/A	N/A	N/A	N/A	N/A	N/A	5875
Gol Gohar	5000	A	3000	A	5000	A	5000	A	4000	A	3500	A	3000	A	5000	A	3000	A	4000	A	N/A	N/A	N/A	N/A	N/A	N/A	N/A	N/A	N/A	N/A	4050
Machine Sazi	4000	A	700	A	100	A	100	200	A	600	A	100	A	2000	A	A	500	A	100	A	N/A	N/A	N/A	N/A	N/A	N/A	N/A	N/A	N/A	N/A	840
Naft MSJ	1000	A	5000	A	N	A	3000	A	3000	4000	A	6000	A	2000	A	A	5000	A	3000	A	N/A	N/A	N/A	N/A	N/A	N/A	N/A	N/A	N/A	N/A	3556
Nassaji	A	6000	A	8000	A	7000	8000	A	4000	A	15000	A	8000	A	7000	7000	A	6000	A	3000	N/A	N/A	N/A	N/A	N/A	N/A	N/A	N/A	N/A	N/A	7182
Pars Jam	A	3000	A	5000	3000	A	1000	A	2000	A	3000	A	500	A	3000	6000	A	700	A	A	N/A	N/A	N/A	N/A	N/A	N/A	N/A	N/A	N/A	N/A	2720
Paykan	300	A	A	200	A	100	A	300	A	200	A	6000	A	10000	A	A	300	100	A	300	N/A	N/A	N/A	N/A	N/A	N/A	N/A	N/A	N/A	N/A	1780
Persepolis	25000	A	12000	A	20000	A	N	A	16000	A	8000	40000	A	30000	A	A	40000	A	57000	N/A	N/A	N/A	N/A	N/A	N/A	N/A	N/A	N/A	N/A	N/A	27556
Saipa	A	500	500	A	6000	A	2000	A	200	A	200	A	200	A	8000	300	A	A	400	A	N/A	N/A	N/A	N/A	N/A	N/A	N/A	N/A	N/A	N/A	1830
Sanat Naft	A	5000	A	6000	A	1500	A	5000	A	A	12000	A	3000	A	7000	12000	A	8000	A	5000	N/A	N/A	N/A	N/A	N/A	N/A	N/A	N/A	N/A	N/A	6350
Sepahan	A	25000	A	10000	A	15000	A	20000	A	30000	A	45000	A	A	10000	7000	A	10000	A	X	N/A	N/A	N/A	N/A	N/A	N/A	N/A	N/A	N/A	N/A	19111
Shahin Bushehr	7000	A	2000	A	A	2000	A	10000	A	5000	A	2000	A	3000	A	A	3000	A	1000	6000	N/A	N/A	N/A	N/A	N/A	N/A	N/A	N/A	N/A	N/A	4100
Shahr Khodro	A	7000	A	15000	A	23000	A	3500	A	8000	A	2000	A	7000	A	5000	A	2500	A	C	N/A	N/A	N/A	N/A	N/A	N/A	N/A	N/A	N/A	N/A	8111
Tractor	A	50000	A	17000	A	25000	A	A	80000	A	20000	A	4000	A	2000	10000	A	7000	A	4000	N/A	N/A	N/A	N/A	N/A	N/A	N/A	N/A	N/A	N/A	21900
Zob Ahan	2000	A	3000	A	5000	A	1000	A	500	A	500	A	5000	2000	A	A	500	A	2000	A	N/A	N/A	N/A	N/A	N/A	N/A	N/A	N/A	N/A	N/A	2150
Total	50300	116500	31200	118200	43100	73600	20100	56000	109700	92800	62200	102100	88700	57000	52000	62300	N/A	43300	70500	19300	N/A	N/A	N/A	N/A	N/A	N/A	N/A	N/A	N/A	N/A	71422
Average	6288	14563	3900	14775	6157	10514	2871	7000	13713	11600	7775	12763	11088	7125	6500	7788	N/A	5413	8813	3860	N/A	N/A	N/A	N/A	N/A	N/A	N/A	N/A	N/A	N/A	8737

Notes:
Updated to games played on 23 February 2020. Source:
Matches with spectator bans are not included in average attendances
A=Away
N=Spectator Ban
C=No spectator due to CoronaVirus prevention
X=Not played

=== Highest attendances ===
Rank	Home team	Score	Away team	Attendance	Date	Week	Stadium
1	Tractor	2–4	Esteghlal	80000	1 November 2019	9	Yadegar-e Emam Stadium
2	Esteghlal	1–0	Shahr Khodro	65000	5 December 2019	13	Azadi Stadium
3	Esteghlal	0–1	Persepolis	57000	22 September 2019	4	Azadi Stadium
3	Persepolis	2–2	Esteghlal	57000	6 February 2020	19	Azadi Stadium
5	Tractor	1–0	Persepolis	50000	30 August 2019	2	Yadegar-e Emam Stadium
6	Sepahan	2–2	Esteghlal	45000	30 November 2019	12	Naghsh-e Jahan Stadium
7	Persepolis	1–0	Nassaji	40000	27 December 2019	12	Azadi Stadium
7	Persepolis	2–0	Tractor	40000	26 January 2020	17	Azadi Stadium
9	Sepahan	2–0	Tractor	30000	5 November 2019	10	Naghsh-e Jahan Stadium
9	Persepolis	2–1	Gol Gohar	30000	10 December 2019	14	Azadi Stadium

Notes:
Updated to games played on 7 February 2020. Source:

== See also ==
- 2019–20 Azadegan League
- 2019–20 League 2
- 2019–20 League 3
- 2019–20 Hazfi Cup
- 2019 Iranian Super Cup
- 2020 AFC Champions League
