= Naeim Saadavi =

Iranian footballer (born 1969)

Naeim Sadavi
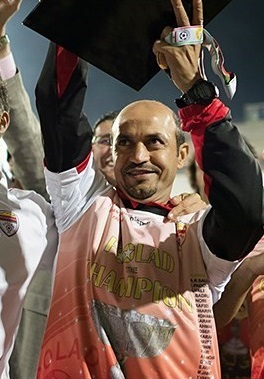

Personal information
- Full name: Naeim Sadavi Saad
- Date of birth: 16 June 1969 (age 57)
- Place of birth: Ahvaz, Iran
- Height: 1.78 m (5 ft 10 in)
- Position: Defender

Team information
- Current team: Foolad (technical manager)

Senior career*
Years	Team	Apps	(Gls)
1994–1995	Bahman		
1995–1999	Persepolis		
1999–2004	Foolad		

International career
1996–1998	Iran	26	(1)

Managerial career
- 2005: Sanat Naft
- 2005–2007: Shahin Bushehr
- 2007: Iran U23 (assistant)
- 2008–2009: Persepolis (assistant)
- 2009–2016: Foolad (assistant)
- 2016–2017: Foolad
- * Club domestic league appearances and goals

Naeim Sadavi Saad (Persian: نعیم سعداوی; born 16 June 1969) is an Iranian former professional football coach and former player. A defender, he was banned from playing for a year for doping.

== Club career ==
Sadavi was born in Ahvaz. He played for a few clubs in Iran, namely Bahman, Persepolis FC and Foolad FC.

=== Doping ban ===
He tested positive for banned substances and was banned for playing for a year for doping,

== International career ==
Sadavi participated at 1998 FIFA World Cup with the Iran national team.

== Managerial career ==
Sadavi coached Sanat Naft FC and has coached Shahin Bushehr in Iran's Azadegan League from 2005 after Human Afazeli's departure from the club. On 25 May 2016, he was appointed as head coach of Foolad with signing a three-year contract with the club.

== Career statistics ==
Scores and results list Iran's goal tally first.

#	Date	Venue	Opponent	Score	Result	Competition
1	8 December 1996	Dubai, United Arab Emirates	Thailand	1–0	3–1	1996 AFC Asian Cup

== Managerial statistics ==
As of 4 May 2017

Team	From	To	Record							
Team	From	To	G	W	D	L	GF	GA	+/-	Win %
Foolad	June 2016	May 2017	32	9	15	8	33	34	−1	28.13
Total			32	9	15	8	33	34	−1	28.13
