= Kvilitaia =

Kvilitaia (Georgian: ქვილითაია) is a Georgian surname. Notable people with the surname include:

- Giorgi Kvilitaia (born 1993), Georgian footballer
- Maksime Kvilitaia (born 1985), Georgian footballer
