= Amir Roustaei =

Iranian footballer

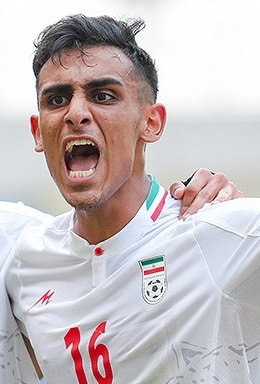

Personal information
- Full name: Amir Roustaei
- Date of birth: August 5, 1997 (age 29)
- Place of birth: Tehran, Iran
- Height: 1.82 m (6 ft 0 in)
- Position: Forward

Team information
- Current team: Mes Shahr-e Babak
- Number: 9

Youth career
- 2011–2014: Persepolis
- 2014–2017: Paykan

Senior career*
Years	Team	Apps	(Gls)
2017–2019	Paykan	35	(2)
2019–2021	Persepolis	9	(0)
2020–2021	→ Paykan (loan)	27	(1)
2021–2022	Naft Masjed Soleyman	26	(1)
2022–2023	Al Shahaniya	13	(8)
2023–2024	Sitra		
2024–2025	Al-Waab	14	(5)
2025–2026	Lusail	13	(11)
2026–	Mes Shahr-e Babak	7	(1)

International career^{‡}
2017–2018	Iran U20	5	(0)
2018–2020	Iran U23	6	(1)
- * Club domestic league appearances and goals as of 8 May 2023 ‡ National team caps and goals as of 6 March 2017

Amir Roustaei (Persian: امیر روستایی born August 5, 1997) is an Iranian football forward who currently plays as a forward.

== Career ==
=== Sitra Club ===
On 28 June 2023, following a successful spell at Al Shahaniya in the Qatari Second Division, Roustaei signed a one-year contract with Sitra in the Bahraini Premier League. In doing so, he became the first Iranian to play professional football in Bahrain.

== Career statistics ==
As of 8 May 2023

Club	Division	Season	League		National Cup		Second Division Cup		Asia		Total	
Club	Division	Season	Apps	Goals	Apps	Goals	Apps	Goals	Apps	Goals	Apps	Goals
Paykan	Pro League	2017–18	20	2	1	0	—		—		21	2
Paykan	Pro League	2018–19	16	0	2	0	—		—		18	0
Paykan	Total		36	2	3	0	—		—		39	2
Persepolis	Pro League	2019–20	6	0	0	0	—		0	0	6	0
Persepolis	Total		6	0	0	0	0	0	0	0	6	0
Paykan (loan)	Pro League	2020–21	26	1	1	0	—		—		27	1
Paykan (loan)	Total		26	1	1	0	—		—		27	1
Al Shahaniya	Qatari Second Division	2022–23	13	8	2	2	8	7	—		23	17
Al Shahaniya	Total		13	8	2	2	8	7	0	0	23	17
Career Totals			81	11	6	2	8	7	0	0	95	20

== Honours ==
Persepolis

- Persian Gulf Pro League (1): 2019–20

== See also ==
- Amir Roustaei on Instagram
