= Sajjad Moshkelpour =

Iranian footballer

Personal information
- Full name: Sajjad Moshkelpour
- Date of birth: 4 August 1990 (age 36)
- Place of birth: Shadegan, Iran
- Height: 1.88 m (6 ft 2 in)
- Position: Centre-back

Team information
- Current team: Shahin Bushehr
- Number: 49

Youth career
- –2009: Sanat Naft

Senior career*
Years	Team	Apps	(Gls)
2009–2013	Sanat Naft Abadan	86	(6)
2013–2017	Saipa	78	(1)
2017–2018	Khooneh be Khooneh	10	(1)
2018–2019	Paykan	26	(0)
2019–2020	Hanoi FC	0	(0)
2020	Shahin Bushehr	8	(1)

International career^{‡}
2010–2012	Iran U23	1	(0)
- * Club domestic league appearances and goals as of 12 July 2019 ‡ National team caps and goals as of 26 March 2010

Sajjad Moshkelpour (Persian: سجاد مشکل‌پور; born 4 August 1990) is an Iranian footballer who plays for Hanoi FC in the V.League 1.

== Club career ==
Moshkelpour had been with Sanat Naft from 2009 to 2013. After Sanat Naft's relegation, Moshkelpour joined Saipa with a two years contract. Coach Engin Firat transferred the unknown Moshkelpour to Saipa and made him to one of the best defender in the League.

== Club career statistics ==
As of 12 July 2019

Club	Division	Season	League		Hazfi Cup		Asia		Total	
Club	Division	Season	Apps	Goals	Apps	Goals	Apps	Goals	Apps	Goals
Sanat Naft	Division 1	2009–10	7	0	2	0	—		9	0
Sanat Naft	Pro League	2010–11	28	0	0	0	—		28	0
Sanat Naft	Pro League	2011–12	22	3	2	0	—		24	3
Sanat Naft	Pro League	2012–13	29	3	3	0	—		32	3
Sanat Naft	Total		86	6	7	0	—		93	6
Saipa	Pro League	2013–14	26	0	1	0	—		27	0
Saipa	Pro League	2014–15	14	0	0	0	—		14	0
Saipa	Pro League	2015–16	19	1	1	0	—		20	1
Saipa	Pro League	2016–17	19	0	2	0	—		21	0
Saipa	Total		78	1	4	0	—		82	1
Khooneh be Khooneh	Division 1	2017–18	10	1	3	0	—		13	1
Paykan	Pro League	2017–18	10	0	0	0	—		10	0
Paykan	Pro League	2018–19	16	0	1	0	—		17	0
Paykan	Total		26	0	1	0	—		27	0
Hanoi FC	V.League 1	2019	0	0	0	0	0	0	0	0
Career total			200	8	15	0	0	0	215	8

== International career ==
In 2010, Moshkelpour was selected to participate in Iran U-23 football team's training camp in Poland.
