= Amirhossein Bayat =

Iranian footballer (born 1998)

Personal information
- Date of birth: 10 May 1998 (age 28)
- Place of birth: Tehran, Iran
- Height: 1.88 m (6 ft 2 in)
- Position: Goalkeeper

Youth career
- 2015–2016: Naft Tehran
- 2016–2017: Paykan
- 2017–2018: Naft Novin
- 2018–2019: Baadraan

Senior career*
Years	Team	Apps	(Gls)
2017–2018	Naft Novin	1	(0)
2019–2020	Persepolis	0	(0)
2021	Esteghlal	0	(0)
- * Club domestic league appearances and goals as of 11 Dec 2020

Amirhossein Bayat (Persian: امیرحسین بیات, born 10 May 1998) is an Iranian goalkeeper who currently plays for Esteghlal in the Persian Gulf Pro League.

== Club career ==
=== Early career ===
Bayat started his career as a youth player at Paykan where he was invited to Iran national U-20 football team.

=== Persepolis ===
He moved to Persepolis in the summer 2019, was a regular player in his first season, and wore shirt number 12 as the team's third goalkeeper.

== Club career statistics ==
Last Update 1 July 2017

Club performance			League		Cup		Continental		Total	
Season	Club	League	Apps	Goals	Apps	Goals	Apps	Goals	Apps	Goals
Iran			League		Hazfi Cup		Asia		Total	
2017–18	Naft Novin	1	0		0	–	–		1	
2019–20	Persepolis	0	0		0	–	–		0	
Career total		1	0	0	0	0	0	0	0	

== Honours ==
Persepolis

- Persian Gulf Pro League: 2019–20
