= Dastgerdi =

Dastgerdi دستگردي
- Village
- Location within Iran
- Coordinates: 34°58′02″N 45°56′59″E
- Country: Iran
- Province: Kermanshah
- County: Salas-e Babajani
- Bakhsh: Central
- Rural District: Khaneh Shur

Population (2006)
  - Total: 48
- Time zone: UTC+3:30 (IRST)
  - Summer (DST): UTC+4:30 (IRDT)

Dastgerdi (Persian: دستگردي, also Romanized as Dastgerdī; also known as Banāvach and Dastgerdī-ye Banāvach) is a village in Khaneh Shur Rural District, in the Central District of Salas-e Babajani County, Kermanshah Province, Iran. At the 2006 census, its population was 48 people, divided into 10 families.
