= Mojtaba Sarasiaei =

Iranian footballer and manager

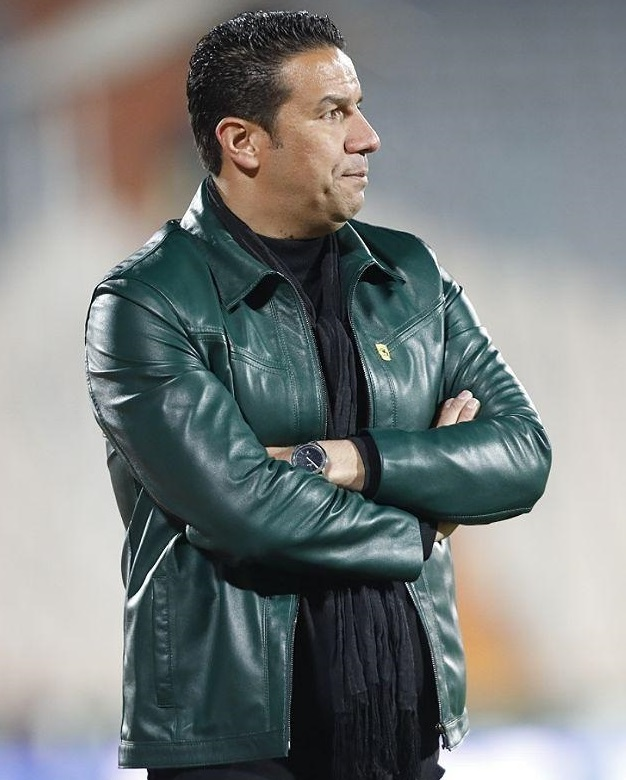

Personal information
- Date of birth: 23 September 1979 (age 47)
- Place of birth: Mashhad, Iran

Team information
- Current team: Fajr Sepasi

Senior career*
Years	Team	Apps	(Gls)
2000–2006	Payam		
2006–2009	Paykan		
2009–2013	Aboumoslem		

Managerial career
- 2013–2020: Padideh (technical advisor)
- 2020: Shahr Khodro
- 2020: Gol Gohar Sirjan (assistant)
- 2020–2021: Mes Rafsanjan (assistant)
- 2021–2022: Gol Gohar (assistant manager)
- 2022–: Fajr Sepasi
- * Club domestic league appearances and goals

Mojtaba Sarasiaei (Persian: مجتبی سرآسیایی; born 23 September 1979) is an Iranian football manager who currently is Head coach in Fajr Sepasi.

He played as a defender for Payam Paykan and Aboumoslem in Azadegan League and Persian Gulf Pro League until the year 2014.

== Managerial Statistics ==
Team	From	To	Record				
Team	From	To	G	W	D	L	Win %
Padideh	January 2020	July 2020	10	5	1	4	50.00
