= Shahin Bushehr F.C. =

Iranian football club

Shahin Bushehr
- Full name: Shahin Bushehr Football Club
- Nickname: Hawk
- Founded: 1 May 1942; 83 years ago as Khalij
- Ground: Shahid Mahdavi Stadium
- Capacity: 15,000
- Owner: People of Bushehr
- Manager: People of Bushehr
- League: League 2 (Iran)
- 2023–24: League 2 (Iran), 14th (relegated)
- Website: https://www.instagram.com/shahinbushehr_official/
Home colours	Away colours

Shahin Lian Shahrdari Bushehr Football Club (Persian: باشگاه فوتبال شاهین شهرداری بوشهر, Bashgah-e Futbal-e Shahin Shiherdari-ye Bushiher) is an Iranian football club based in Bushehr, Iran. They are one of the most historical football clubs in Iran and hold home games at Shahid Mahdavi Stadium.

== History ==
=== Shahin F.C. (1942–1967) ===
Shahin F.C. was established in 1942 by Dr Abbas Ekrami, a teacher.

Shahin F.C. Many of the players shown in this photo went on to play for Persepolis.

Ekrami founded the club with help of some young students under the motto

اول اخلاق، دوم درس، سوم ورزش
First ethics, second education, third sports.

— Shahin F.C. Motto

Shahin produced many talented players like Parviz Dehdari, Masoud Boroumand, Homayoun Behzadi, Jafar Kashani, Hossein Kalani, Hamid Shirzadegan, and many more that played for Team Melli. These talents made Shahin popular in the 1960s but its very popularity was viewed as a threat by the Iran Football Federation and the Keihan Varzeshi newspaper (Iran's most important sports publication at the time). The conflict between them became worse and on July 9, 1967, two days after Shahin's 3–0 win against Tehranjavan F.C., the Iran Sports Organization declared Shahin F.C. as dissolved. League attendance dropped and other clubs including Pas, Rah Ahan, and Oghab tried to sign Shahin players.

=== Establishment ===
Shahin Bushehr was established in 1950 with the name of Khalije Bushehr.

After years of history and competing in different levels of the Iranian football league system, including a 1994–95 appearance in the top division and several years in the second level, Shahin Bushehr was renamed Shahin Pars Jonoubi Bushehr in 2007 and promoted to IPL in 2009. The club is now owned by Pars Special Economic Energy Zone, based in Asalouyeh, Bushehr Province.

=== Promotion to the Iran Pro League ===
The club achieved promotion to the Iran Pro League after a 3–2 aggregate playoff victory against Tabriz's Shahrari Tabriz, joining Tractor Sazi in the 2009–2010 edition of the Iran Pro League.

=== Relegation ===
In the 2011–12 season, the Shahin were finalists in the Hazfi Cup but lost to Esteghlal, in the same season the team was relegated to the Azadegan League. Shahin's downward trend continued the following year as they were relegated to the 2nd Division. They again were relegated in 2014, this time to the 3rd Division.

==== Municipality takeover ====
Following a take over by the municipality in the summer of 2015, the club was renamed to Shahin Shahrdari Bushehr and bought the rights of Bahman Shiraz in the 2nd Division. After this takeover Shahin became one of the favourites to be promoted to the Azadegan League. Shahin started the 2015–16 well and advanced to the final group phase, however Shahin finished fourth in Group A and missed out on promotion by four points.

== Colours and crest ==
The common home kit includes a white shirt, black shorts, and white socks. Red and Yellow colours are also seen in the kit. The away kit of the club is commonly with a red background.

== Stadium and facilities ==
The club currently plays its home games at Bushehr's Shahid Beheshti Stadium with a 15,000 capacity.

== Players ==
As of July 29, 2020 Note: Flags indicate national team as defined under FIFA eligibility rules; some limited exceptions apply. Players may hold more than one non-FIFA nationality.

No.	Pos.	Nation	Player
3	DF	IRN	Morteza Gholamalitabar
4	DF	GEO	Luka Gadrani ^{U23}
5	DF	IRN	Behrooz Norouzifard
8	MF	IRN	Milad Shabanlou ^{U25}
9	MF	IRN	Salman Bahrani
10	FW	IRN	Bahman Salari
12	GK	IRN	Mohammad Hossein Houpanah ^{U21}
13	MF	IRN	Meysam Doraghi
14	MF	IRN	Amirhossein Mousazadeh
16	DF	IRN	Ali Raeisi ^{U23}
17	MF	IRN	Mostafa Ahmadi
18	MF	IRN	Yousef Sabri ^{U23}
19	DF	IRN	Alireza Ebrahimi ^{U21}

No.	Pos.	Nation	Player
24	MF	IRN	Danial Momeni ^{U21}
25	GK	GEO	Maksime Kvilitaia
29	MF	IRN	Shahab Karami
32	FW	IRN	Milad Saremi
37	FW	IRN	Esmaeil Sharifat
40	DF	IRN	Hassan Najafi
66	MF	IRN	Mohammad Shakibkhou ^{U19}
68	MF	IRN	Mohammad Soltani Mehr ^{U21}
70	MF	IRN	Amin Mashayekh
71	DF	IRN	Sajjad Moshkelpour
76	MF	IRN	Reza Dehghan ^{U23}
88	MF	IRN	Hamed Mahmoudi
—	DF	IRN	Ali Akbar Heydarnia

== Club managers ==
Name	Nat	From	To
Rasoul Hasanpour	(Iran)	29 September 1974	5 September 1994
Ahmad Tourani	(Iran)	5 September 1994	3 January 1995
Hamid Kololi Fard	(Iran)	3 January 1995	4 February 2006
Reza Vatankhah	(Iran)	1 March 2006	1 November 2006
Naeim Saadavi	(Iran)	1 November 2006	17 February 2007
Hamid Kololi Fard	(Iran)	17 February 2007	14 May 2007
Naeim Saadavi	(Iran)	5 June 2007	29 November 2007
Nosrat Irandoost	(Iran)	2 December 2007	30 May 2008
Hamid Kololi Fard	(Iran)	1 June 2008	1 September 2009
Mahmoud Yavari	(Iran)	1 September 2009	14 May 2010
Hamid Estili	(Iran)	16 June 2010	6 April 2011
Akbar Misaghian*	(Iran)	6 April 2011	22 June 2011
Hamid Derakhshan	(Iran)	22 June 2011	5 October 2011
Firouz Karimi	(Iran)	6 October 2011	6 February 2012
Hamid Derakhshan	(Iran)	13 February 2012	3 April 2012
Asghar Kamyab*	(Iran)	3 April 2012	18 July 2012
Hamid Kololi Fard	(Iran)	18 July 2012	11 November 2012
Ali Hanteh	(Iran)	11 November 2012	20 November 2012
Masoud Palizdan	(Iran)	20 November 2012	21 July 2013
Mehdi Ghanbari	(Iran)	21 July 2013	31 December 2013
Abdolreza Baziyari	(Iran)	31 December 2013	4 September 2015
Asghar Kamyab	(Iran)	4 September 2015	1 September 2016
Mohammad Ahmadzadeh	(Iran)	1 September 2016	22 December 2017
Mehdi Pashazadeh	(Iran)	1 January 2018	21 June 2018
Mahmoud Fekri	(Iran)	28 June 2018	30 January 2019
Abdollah Veisi	(Iran)	4 February 2019	10 October 2019
Mehrdad Karimian*	(Iran)	10 October 2019	11 November 2019
Mišo Krstičević	(Croatia)	12 November 2019	Present

- * = Caretaker

== Club chairmen ==
- (Iran) People of Bushehr
- (Iran) Mohammad Dameshghi
- (Iran) Hossein Bastin
- (Iran) Vahid Vaezi

== Season-by-season ==
The table below chronicles the achievements of Shahin Bushehr in various competitions since 1993.

Season	Div.	League	Position	Hazfi Cup	Notes
1993–94	2	2nd Division	3rd		Promoted
1994–95	1	Azadegan League	12th		Relegated
1995–96	2	2nd Division	7th
1996–97	2	2nd Division	5th
1997–98	2	2nd Division	8th
1998–99	2	2nd Division	7th
1999–00	3	Bushehr Province League	3rd
2000–01	3	Bushehr Province League	1st		Promoted
2001–02	3	2nd Division	8th
2002–03	3	2nd Division	6th		Promoted
2003–04	3	2nd Division	2nd		Promoted
2004–05	2	Azadegan League	7th	First Round
2005–06	2	Azadegan League	4th	First Round
2006–07	2	Azadegan League	9th	First Round
2007–08	2	Azadegan League	8th	First Round
2008–09	2	Azadegan League	2nd	Third Round	Promoted
2009–10	1	Iran Pro League	13th	1/8 Final
2010–11	1	Iran Pro League	14th	1/8 Final
2011–12	1	Iran Pro League	17th	Final	Relegated
2012–13	2	Azadegan League	12th	1/16 Final	Relegated
2013–14	3	2nd Division	14th	Did not qualify	Relegated
2014–15	4	3rd Division	11th	Did not qualify	Relegated
2015–16	3	2nd Division	4th/Group A	Did not qualify	Second Round
2016–17	3	2nd Division	2nd/Group A	Round of 64	Promotion Play-off
2017–18	3	2nd Division	1st/Group B	Did not qualify	Promoted
2018–19	2	Azadegan League	2nd	Third Round	Promoted
2019–20	1	Iran Pro League	16th	Quarter-final	Relegated
