= Maksime Kvilitaia =

Georgian footballer

Personal information
- Full name: Maksime Kvilitaia
- Date of birth: September 17, 1985 (age 41)
- Place of birth: Georgia
- Position: Goalkeeper

Senior career*
Years	Team	Apps	(Gls)
–2006	Meshakhte Tkibuli		
2006–2007	Torpedo Kutaisi		
2007–2009	Spartaki Tbilisi		
2009–2010	Locomotive Tbilisi	33	(0)
2010–2014	Torpedo Kutaisi	34	(0)
2014	Zugdidi	9	(0)
2014–2015	Chikhura	27	(0)
2015–2016	Liakhvi	14	(0)
2016–2019	Torpedo Kutaisi	17	(0)
2019–2020	Shahin Bushehr	20	(0)
2021–2022	Samgurali	37	(0)
- * Club domestic league appearances and goals

Maksime Kvilitaia (Georgian: მაქსიმე ქვილითაია; born September 17, 1985) is a retired Georgian professional football goalkeeper. He played for a number of clubs, securing the Erovnuli Liga, cup and supercup titles.

While Kvilitaia spent most of his long career at Torpedo Kutaisi in three spells, Samgurali turned out his last club before announcing his retirement following the 2022 season. In early 2023, Kvilitaia returned to Torpedo as a goalkeeping coach.

== Honours ==
Torpedo Kutaisi

- Erovnuli Liga: 2017
- Georgian Cup: 2016, 2018
- Georgian Supercup: 2018, 2019
