= Shahid Mahdavi Stadium =

Multi-use stadium in Bushehr, Iran

- Interactive map of Shahid Mahdavi Stadium
- Full name: Shahid Mahdavi Stadium
- Location: Bushehr, Iran
- Coordinates: 28.90075175°N 50.87486786°E
- Owner: Iran Physical Education Organization
- Capacity: 15,000 (Football)
- Surface: Grass

Construction
- Built: 2005
- Opened: 2017

Tenant
- Shahin Shahrdari Bushehr Football Club

Shahid Mahdavi Stadium (Persian: ورزشگاه شهید مهدوی) is a multi-use stadium in Bushehr, Iran. It is currently used for football matches and is the home stadium of Persian Gulf Pro League team Shahin Bushehr The stadium holds 15,000 people.
