= Miguel Teixeira =

Portuguese footballer

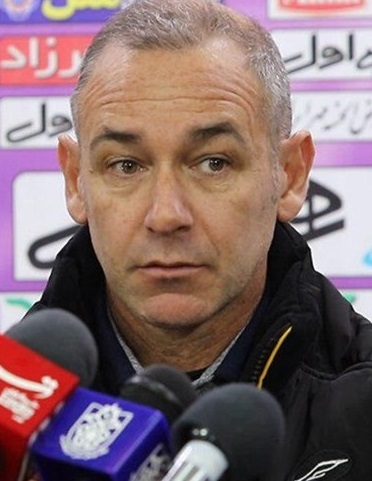

Personal information
- Full name: José Miguel Real Teixeira
- Date of birth: 10 September 1973 (age 53)
- Place of birth: Porto, Portugal
- Height: 1.77 m (5 ft 10 in)
- Position: Defender

Youth career
- 1983–1992: Porto

Senior career*
Years	Team	Apps	(Gls)
1992–1995	Olhanense		
1995–1999	Salgueiros		
1999–2001	Felgueiras		
2001–2003	União		
2003–2005	Olhanense		
2005–2007	Portosantense		
2007–2011	Campinense		
2011–2012	Quarteirense		

Managerial career
- 2012: Moncarapachense (assistant)
- 2013: Olhanense (assistant)
- 2013–2014: Fátima (assistant)
- 2014–2015: Louletano (assistant)
- 2015: Quarteirense
- 2015–2016: Quarteirense (assistant)
- 2016: Almancilense (assistant)
- 2016–2017: Tractor (assistant)
- 2017–2018: Zob Ahan (assistant)
- 2018–2023: Sepahan (assistant)
- 2023–2024: Ittihad Kalba (assistant)
- 2024–: Sepahan (assistant)
- * Club domestic league appearances and goals

José Miguel Real Teixeira (born 10 September 1973) is a Portuguese football manager and former player. He played as a defender.
