= Human Afazeli =

Iranian football coach and player (born 1971)

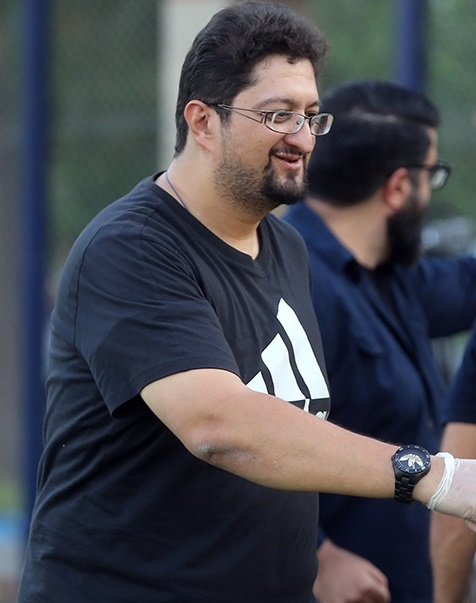

Personal information
- Date of birth: 3 September 1971 (age 55)
- Place of birth: Tehran, Iran

Youth career
- 1983–1984: Rah Ahan
- 1984–1988: Pas

Senior career*
Years	Team	Apps	(Gls)
1988–1991	Pas		

Managerial career
- 2000–2001: Pas U18
- 2001–2002: Shahab Zanjan U21
- 2002–2005: Shahab Zanjan
- 2002–2006: Iran (assistant)
- 2007–2008: Saipa (assistant)
- 2008–2009: Iran (assistant)
- 2010–2011: Iran U-23
- 2011–2012: Steel Azin
- 2014: Iran U-23 (caretaker)
- 2017–2018: Saba Qom
- 2018: Naft Tehran
- 2018–2019: Karun Arvand
- 2019–2020: Pars Jonoubi
- 2020: Machine Sazi
- * Club domestic league appearances and goals

Human Afazeli (Persian: هومن افاضلی) is an Iranian football coach and former player.

== Playing career ==
Afazeli began his youth career at Rah Ahan F.C. in Iran, eventually moving to Pas F.C in 1984. In 1988, he was promoted to the senior setup. He was a part of the senior squad for three seasons, although he did not make an official appearance during this time. His career was cut short in 1991, at the age of 20, following a knee injury.

== Coaching career ==
Having had his playing career cut short, Afazeli moved into coaching at the age of 25. His first senior management role was with Iranian 1st division side, Shahab Zanjan. During his three years with the club, he implemented 4-2-3-1 and 4-4-2 systems with a flat back four. This was a break from the norm in an Iranian football landscape dominated by the traditional 3-5-2 formation.

Afazali's tactical vision and practical savvy did not go unnoticed. After a friendly match between Iran national team and Shahab Zanjan in Tehran, Iran's then head coach Miroslav Ciro Blazevic, who had already guided his Croatian side to third place in the 1998 World Cup, invited Afazeli to join the national team staff as technical adviser and analyst. After Ciro departed, Afazeli stayed with the national team for four more years with newly promoted Branko Ivanković.

He earned a gold medal in the 2002 Asian Games, third-place finish in 2004 AFC Asian Cup, a 2006 FIFA World Cup appearance with Iran, and more than 100 international matches as an assistant and analyst for the national team. He was brought back into the national team in 2008 under new coach Ali Daei.

Afazeli stepped out alongside some coaching staff members after Ali Daei's dismissal in April 2009.

After a few months away from the management, he was selected as Iran Football Federation's technical committee senior member. He refused to join Ali Daei as an assistant in Perspolis of Tehran and spoke of his desire to be a head coach again.

In 2011, he became Iran U23's head coach to help the team reach London's Olympic qualification. He conducted and qualified the team for the next round in a play-off against Kyrgyzstan. Afazeli announced his resignation immediately after the second leg in Bishkek during the post-match press conference due to a "lack of support from the Iranian Olympic Committee and Football Federation of Iran." He was appointed Steel Azin's head coach on 27 June 2011. while Steel Azin was second on the table on the way to promotion to the top flight, FIFA voted to reduce 12 points out of the club due to their case with former coach Theodor Jung and his assistant. On 17 February 2012, Steel Azin and Afazeli decided to part company due to their different views.

On 20 September 2013, the Iranian Football Federation appointed Afazeli as technical director of Iran national under-23 football team, to supervise the team progress and plans for the upcoming Asian Championship in Oman, the first ever championship of the age category in Asia. He later became the manager of the team after the resignation of Ali Reza Mansourian. The team was denied with clubs releasing 18 players and Afazeli took the second team to the tournament in January 2014 in Oman without any preparation camp and friendlies with 19 players in hand. They drew Japan 3–3 in the first match, lost 1–0 against Australia in an entertaining game and beat Kuwait 3 to 1 in the last game, fail to qualify for knock out stage only by goal difference.
