= Jalandhar =

Metropolis in Punjab, India

- Metropolis
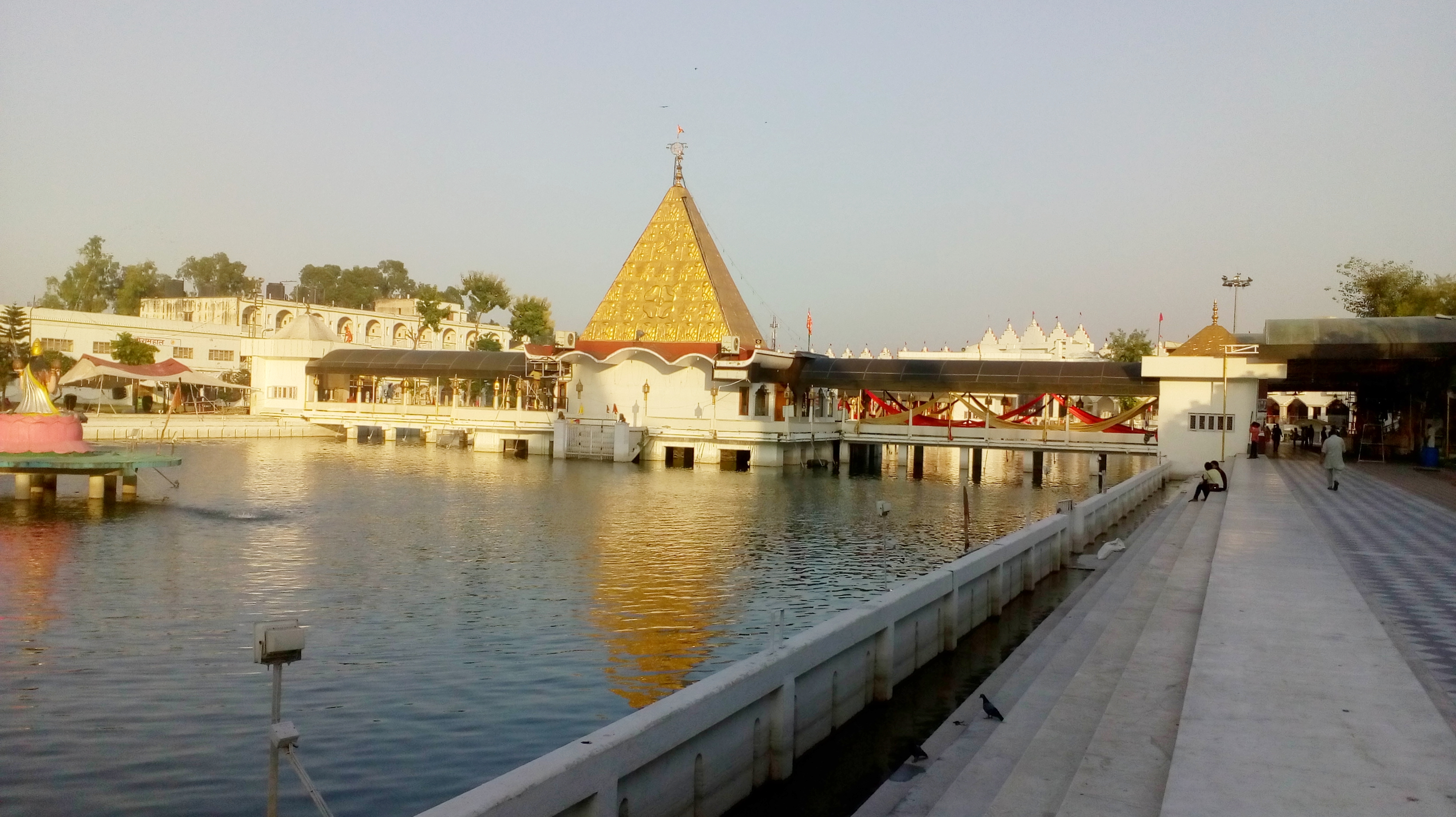
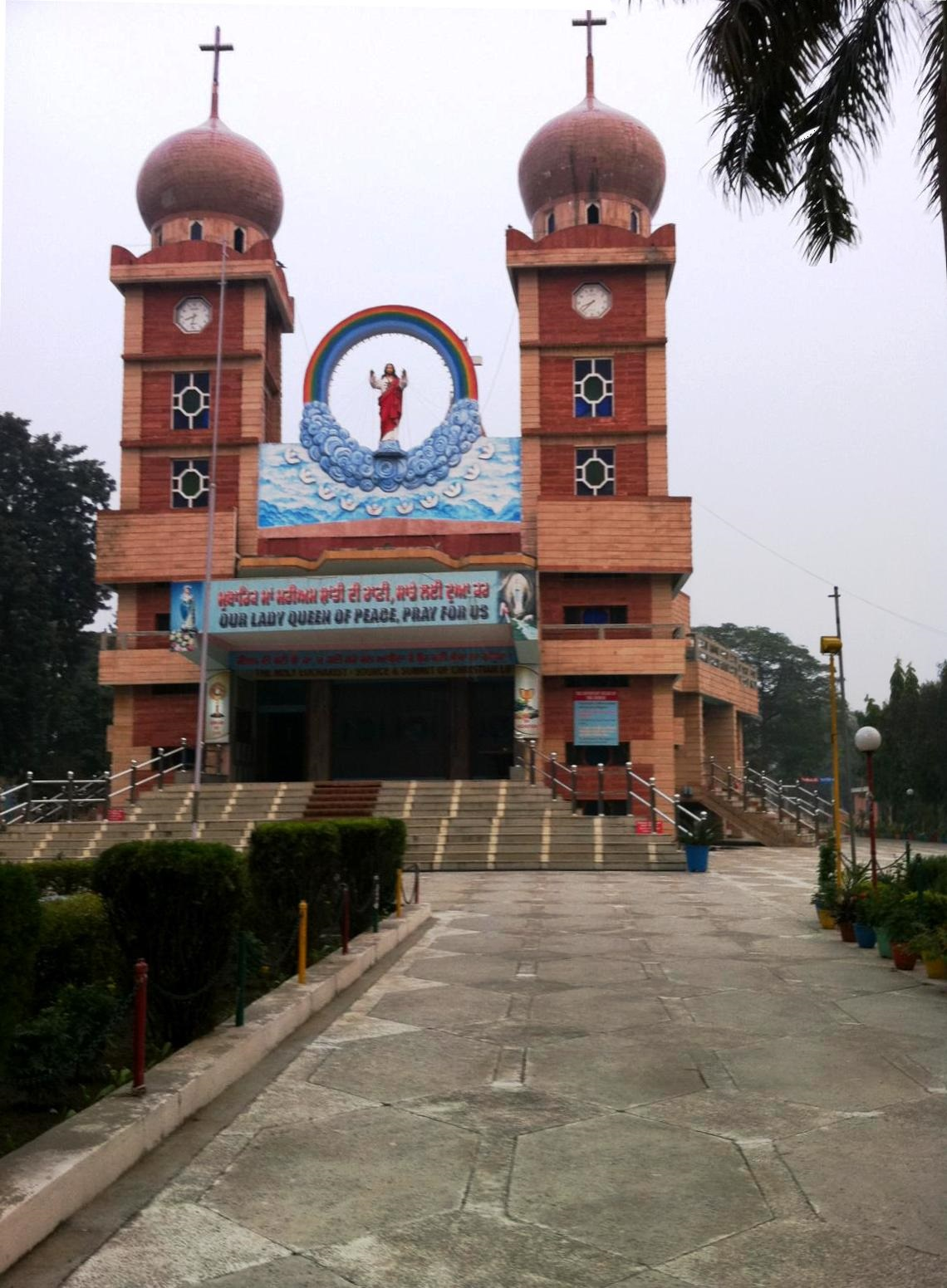
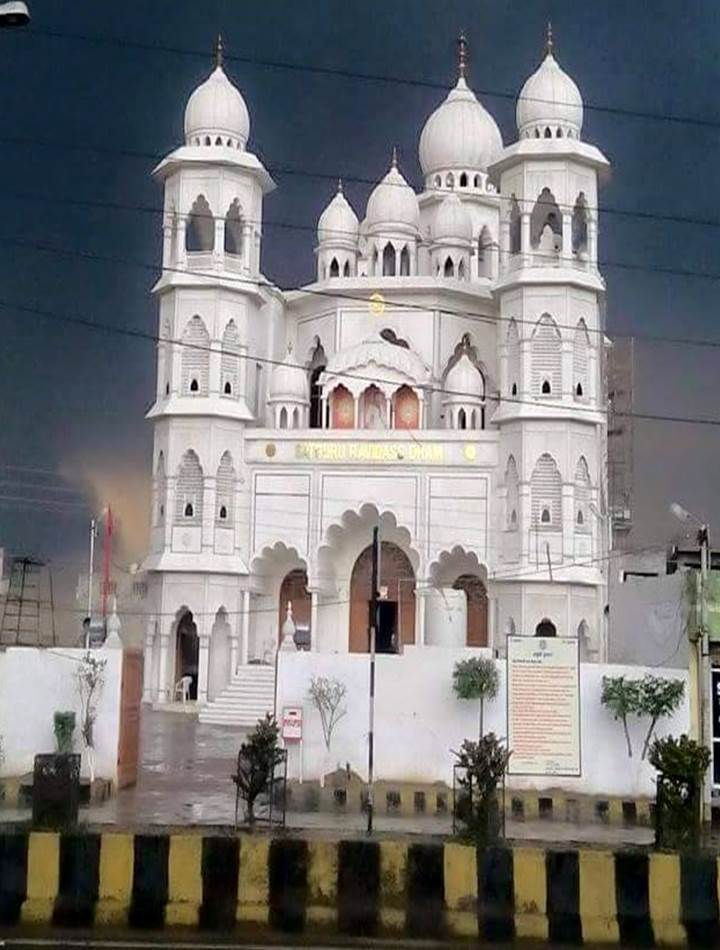
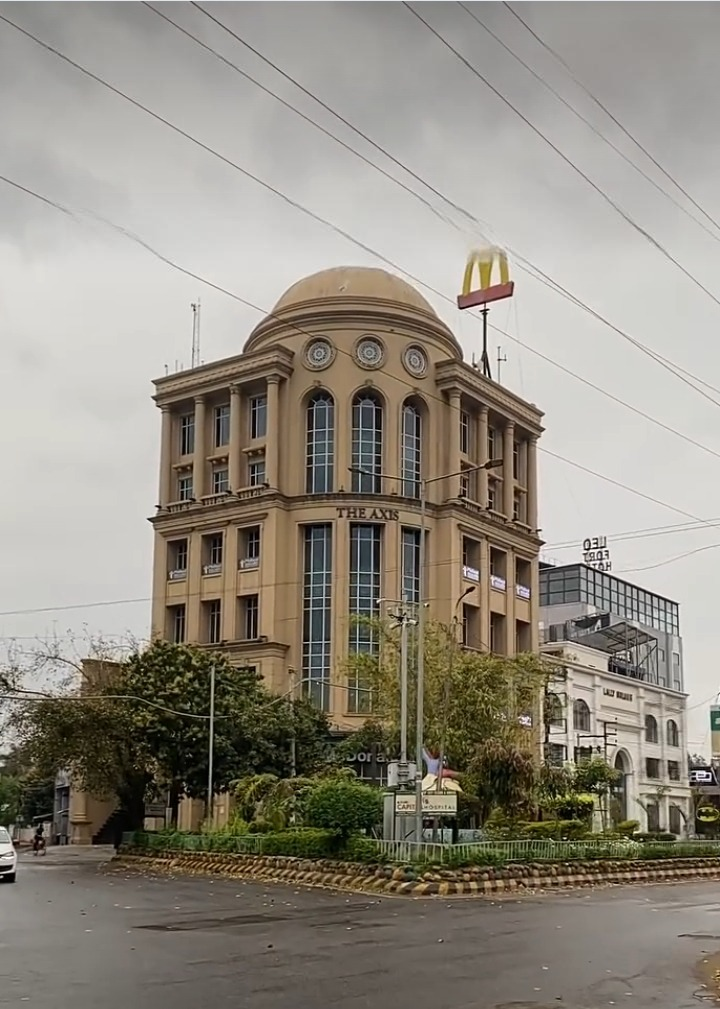
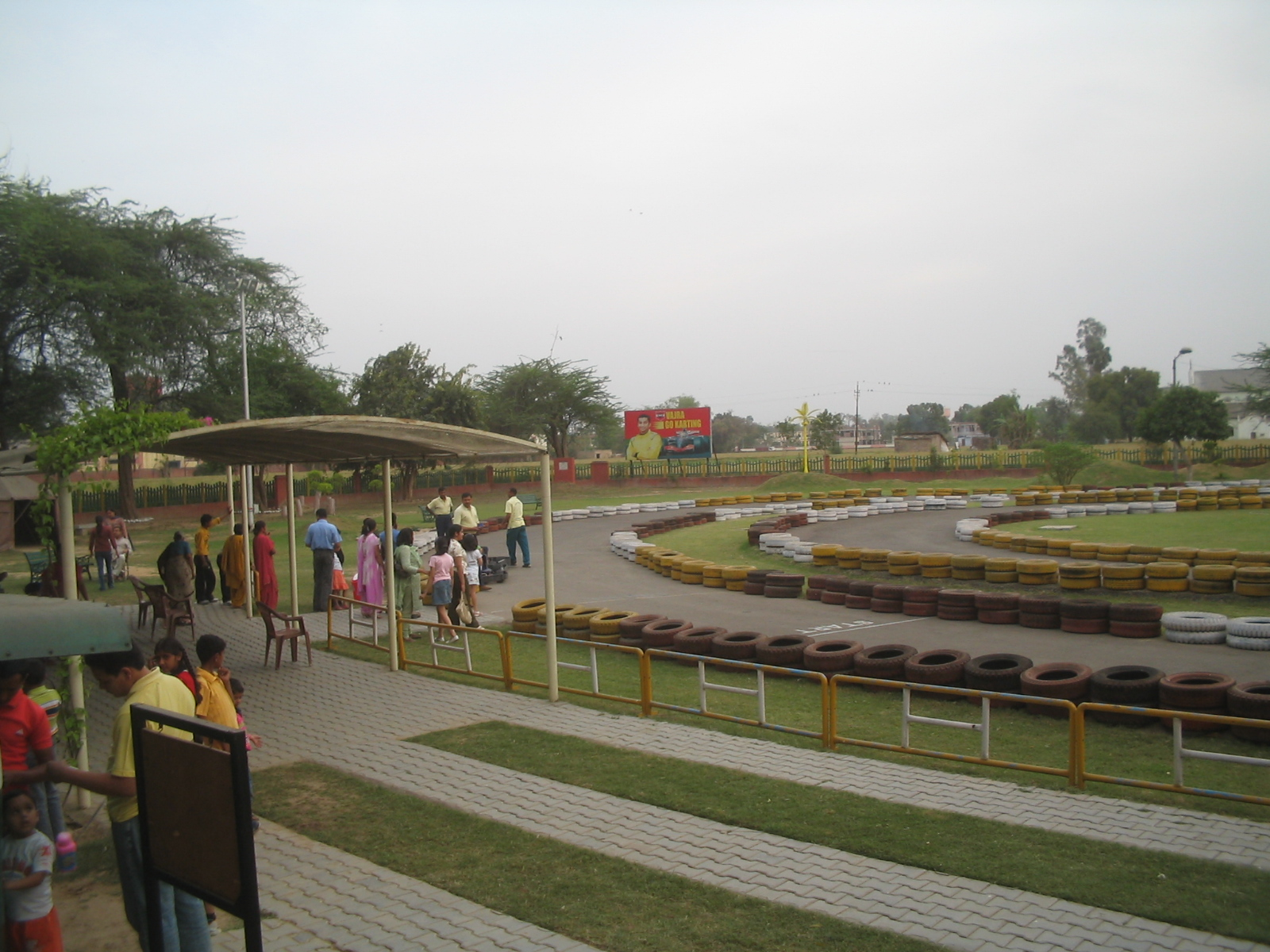
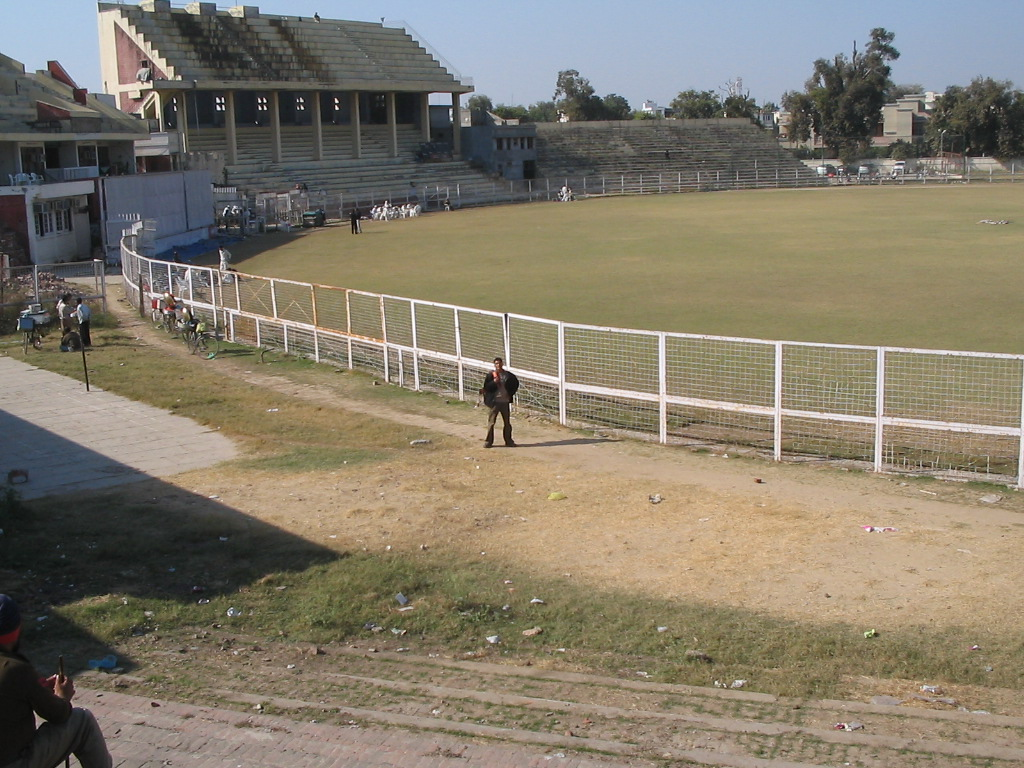
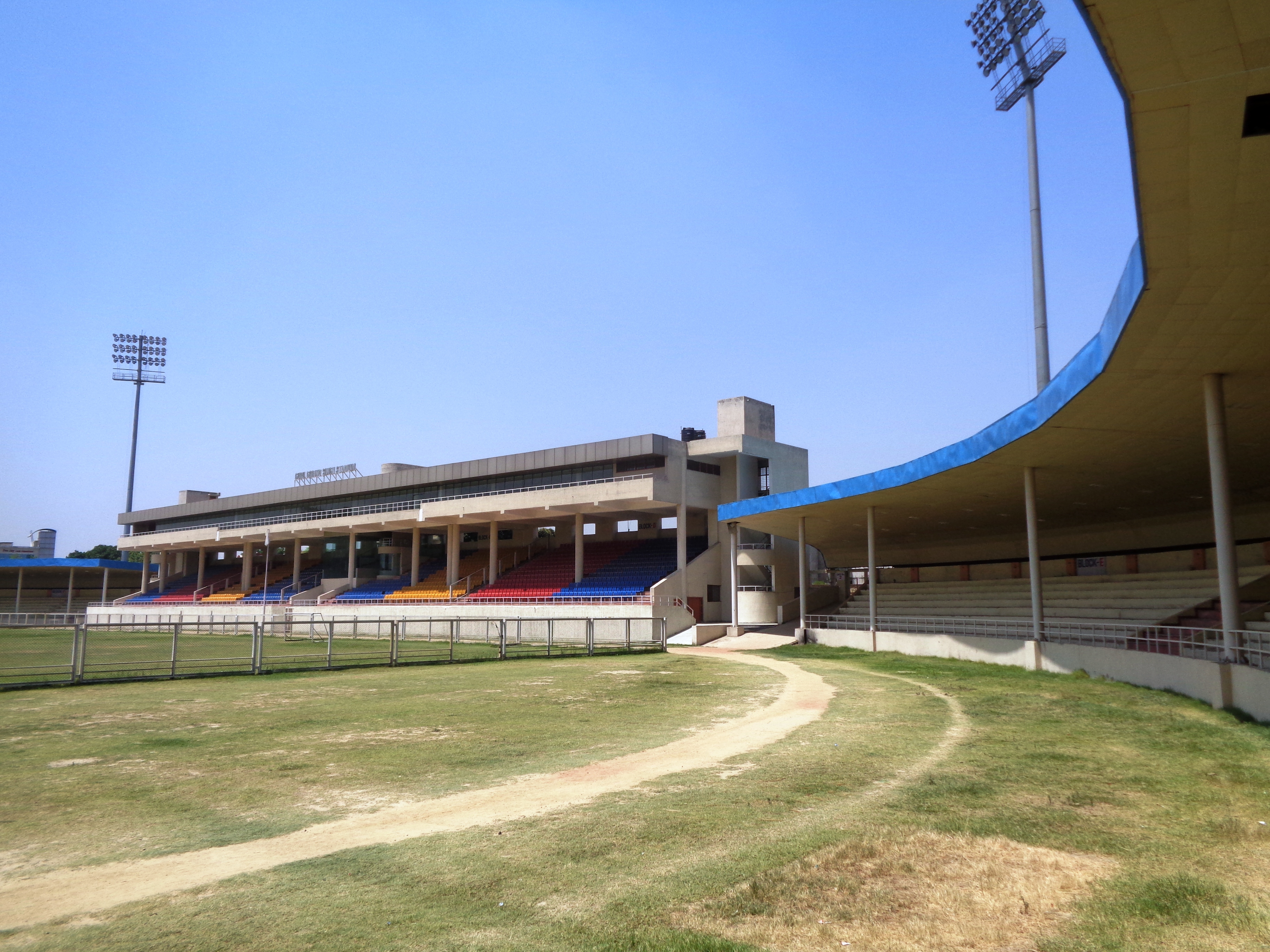
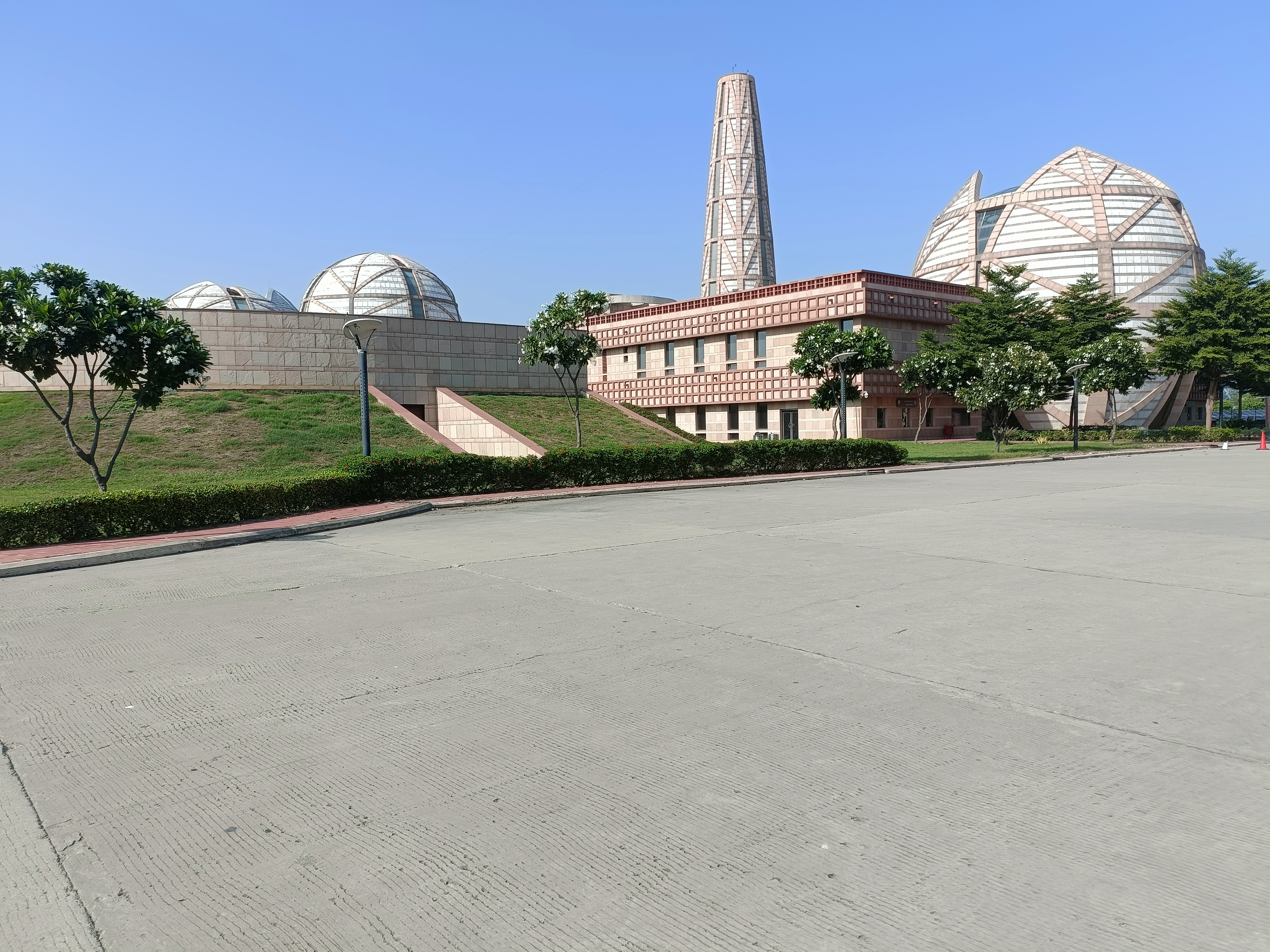
- Devi Talab Mandir St. Mary's Cathedral, Jalandhar Guru Ravidass Dham in Bootan Mandi BMC Chowk in Jawahar Nagar Jalandhar Cantonment Gandhi Stadium Guru Gobind Singh Stadium Jang-e-Azadi Memorial

- Logo of Jalandhar Smart City

- Location within Punjab Location within India
- Coordinates: 31.326015°N 75.576180°E
- Country: India
- State: Punjab
- District: Jalandhar
- Established: 100 AD
- Named for: In Water

Government
  - Type: Democratic
  - Body: Political
  - Divisional Commissioner: Pardeep Kumar, IAS
  - Deputy Commissioner: Himanshu Aggarwal, IAS
  - Member of Parliament: Charanjit Singh Channi, INC

Area
  - Total: 44 sq mi (115 km^{2})
  - Rank: 3rd in Punjab
- Elevation: 748 ft (228 m)

Population (2011)
  - Total: 868,929
  - Density: 2,190/sq mi (847/km^{2})
- Demonym: Jalandhariye
- Time zone: UTC+5:30 (IST)
- PIN: 144 001
- Area code: 0181
- Vehicle registration: PB08, PB90, PB37 PB67, PB33
- Literacy: 75.3%
- sex ratio: 922 females per 1000 male
- Website: jalandhar.nic.in

Jalandhar (Punjabi pronunciation: [d͡ʐəˈlənˌdə̀ɾᵊ]) is a city in the state of Punjab in India. With a considerable population, it ranks as the third most-populous city in the state and is the largest city in the Doaba region. Jalandhar lies alongside the historical Grand Trunk Road and is a well-connected junction for both rail and road networks. The National Highway 1 (NH1), crosses Jalandhar.

== History ==
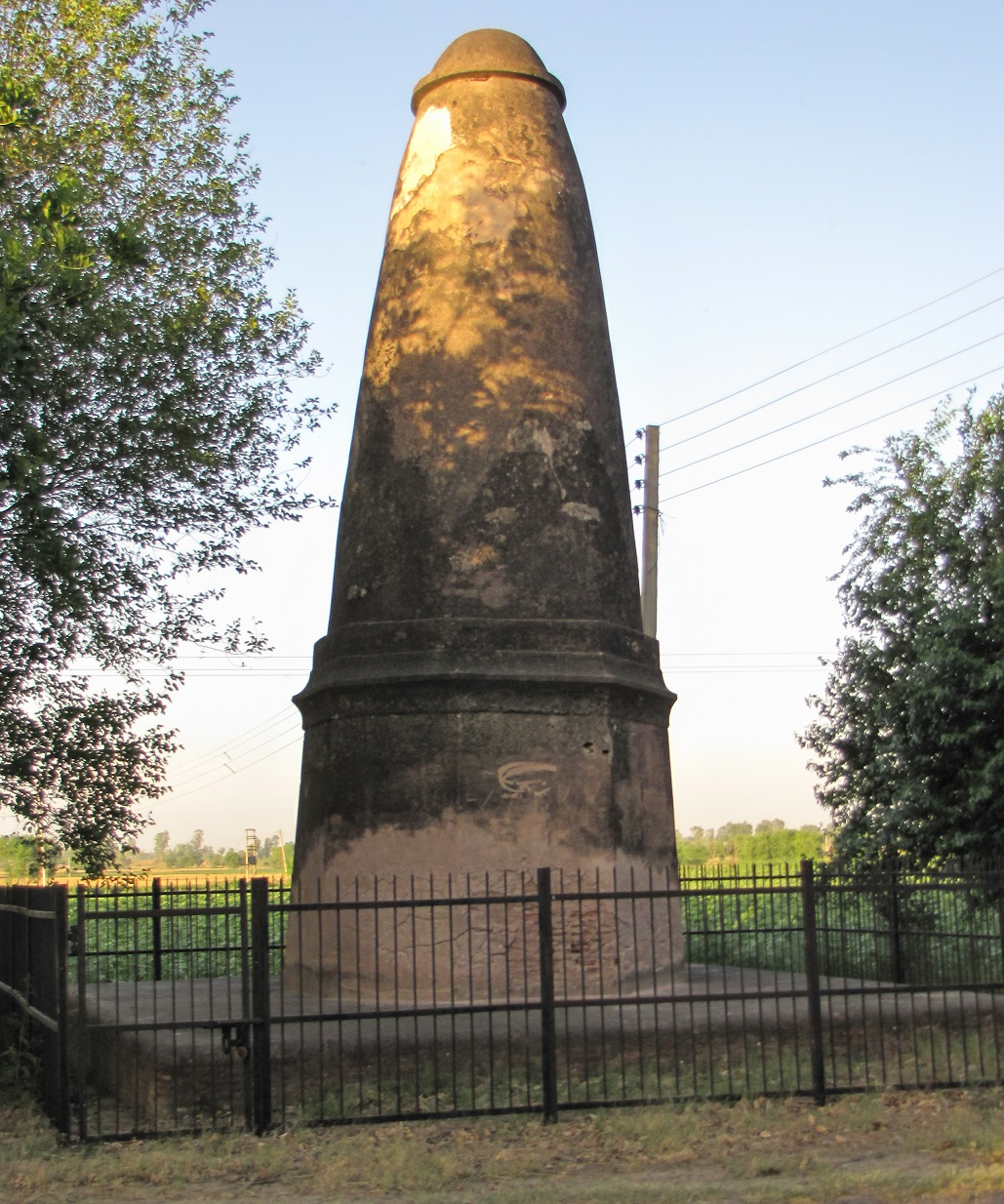
Kos Minar along GT Road in Dakhini near Jalandhar, (Sher Shah Suri period)

The history of Jalandhar District comprises three periods — ancient, medieval and modern.

=== Ancient ===
The city may be named after Jalandhara, a Nath Guru who was from here. It may also be named after Jalandhara, a son of Shiva mentioned in the Shiva Purana. The city was founded by Devasya Verma as mentioned in the Vedas. Other possibilities include that it was the capital of the kingdom of Lava, a son of Rama, or that the name derives from the vernacular term Jalandhar, meaning area inside the water, i.e., tract lying between the two rivers Satluj and Beas. The whole of Punjab and the area of present Jalandhar District was part of the Indus Valley Civilization. Harappa and Mohenjo-daro are the sites where remains of the Indus Valley civilisation have been found extensively. The archaeological explorations made during recent years have pushed the ancient times of Jalandhar District of the Harappa period. Jalandhar was known as Prasthala during the Vedic period and it was the capital of the Trigarta Kingdom.

=== Medieval ===
Jalandhar and the Doaba may have been conquered around 1070 by the Ghaznavids during the reign of Ibrahim of Ghazni. The city was conquered by Raja Jasrat in 1431. It later formed part of the province of Lahore during the Delhi Sultanate and Mughal Empire. The 18th century saw upheaval in Jalandhar amidst an anarchy caused by the disintegration of the Mughals and power struggles involving Persians, Afghans and Sikhs. It was captured by the Faizullahpuria Misl in 1766, and in 1811 Maharaja Ranjit Singh incorporated it within the Sikh Empire.

In 1849, following the annexation of the Punjab by the East India Company, the city of Jalandhar, written in English as Jullundur by company officials, became the headquarters of the division and District of the same name. In 1858, company rule in India ended and the city became part of the British Raj. In the mid to late 19th century, the Punjab administration regarded Jullundur as too densely populated and farmed to capacity. This led to the district being a chief recruitment area for settlers to colonise the newly irrigated Punjab Canal Colonies, in western Punjab.

=== Modern ===
The Khilafat Movement started in the district in the early 1920s to bring pressure on the government to change their policy towards Turkey. Mahatma Gandhi extended sympathy and support to this movement, however in response, the District was declared a 'Proclaimed Area' under the Seditious Meetings Act. In 1924, Pakistani general and military dictator Muhammad Zia-ul-Haq was born in the city.

Prior to the partition of India, Muslims were in plurality in Jalandhar district. According to the 1941 census, Muslims made up 45.2% of the population, compared to Hindus and Sikhs being 27.6% and 26.5% respectively. Within a period of 10 years, from 1941 to 1951, the Muslim population in Jalandhar district reduced from 45.2% to 0.2%.

== Geography ==
=== Climate ===
The city has a hot semi-arid climate with cool winters and long, hot summers. Summers last from April to June and winters from November to February. Temperatures in the summer vary from average highs of around 41 °C or 105.8 °F to average lows of around 25 °C or 77 °F. Winter temperatures have highs of 19 °C or 66.2 °F to lows of 6 °C (43 °F). The climate is dry, except during the brief southwest monsoon season during July and August. The average annual rainfall is about 70 centimetres or 28 inches. In 2018, Jalandhar witnessed unusually heavy rainfall, with an over 20% increase from average rainfall levels. Since it is located in the northern plains, the area feels quite cold during winters and very hot during summers.

=== Rainfall ===
The city receives an average annual rainfall of approximately 700 millimetres (28 in). However, fluctuations are not uncommon, as observed in 2018 when Jalandhar experienced a significant increase in precipitation. The city registered over a 20% increase from its average rainfall that year, which marked it as a year of heavy rainfall.

Despite the variations in climate across seasons, one thing remains constant: the extremity of temperatures, with winters feeling notably cold, and summers, feelings markedly hot due to Jalandhar's location in the northern plains.

Climate data for Jalandhar
Month	Jan	Feb	Mar	Apr	May	Jun	Jul	Aug	Sep	Oct	Nov	Dec	Year
Mean daily maximum °C (°F)	19.4 (66.9)	21.6 (70.9)	26.0 (78.8)	34.5 (94.1)	39.4 (102.9)	40.6 (105.1)	34.1 (93.4)	33.1 (91.6)	32.6 (90.7)	31.5 (88.7)	27.2 (81.0)	22.3 (72.1)	30.2 (86.4)
Mean daily minimum °C (°F)	6.2 (43.2)	8.6 (47.5)	13.2 (55.8)	19.0 (66.2)	23.8 (74.8)	25.6 (78.1)	24.7 (76.5)	25.8 (78.4)	21.8 (71.2)	18.3 (64.9)	12.1 (53.8)	7.2 (45.0)	17.2 (63.0)
Average rainfall mm (inches)	10.7 (0.42)	16.7 (0.66)	32.8 (1.29)	15.2 (0.60)	59.4 (2.34)	89.7 (3.53)	175.2 (6.90)	223.6 (8.80)	60.6 (2.39)	1.5 (0.06)	16 (0.6)	15.9 (0.63)	717.3 (28.22)

Jalandhar has been ranked 39th best "National Clean Air City" under (Category 2 3-10L Population cities) in India.

== Demographics ==
=== Population ===
As per the 2011 census, Jalandhar had a population of 868,929, of which 460,811 were male, and 408,118 female. The literacy rate is 86.20%: for males are 88.81% and females 83.26%. Children of 0-6 years are 90,044 (10.36%), with a sex ratio of 867 females per 1000 males. Scheduled Castes are 27.26% of the population.

=== Religion ===
Religion in Jalandhar city
Religion	Percent
Hinduism	74.90%
Sikhism	21.39%
Islam	1.47%
Christianity	1.02%
Others	1.22%

As per the census of 2011, Hinduism is the predominant religion in Jalandhar city, with adherents of Sikhism being a significant minority.

Religious groups in Jalandhar City (1868−2011) (Note: 1891-1941: Data for the entirety of the town of Jalandhar, which included Jalandhar Municipality and Jalandhar Cantonment.)
Religious group	1868		1881		1891		1901		1911		1921		1931		1941		2011	
Religious group	Pop.	%	Pop.	%	Pop.	%	Pop.	%	Pop.	%	Pop.	%	Pop.	%	Pop.	%	Pop.	%
Islam	33,601	67.11%	31,326	60.1%	38,994	58.9%	40,081	59.17%	40,903	58.59%	42,261	59.52%	52,577	59.06%	80,242	59.31%	12,744	1.47%
Hinduism	15,921	31.8%	18,514	35.52%	23,085	34.87%	24,715	36.49%	23,383	33.49%	24,253	34.16%	30,833 (Note: 1931-1941: Including Ad-Dharmis)	34.63%	48,375	35.76%	650,863	74.9%
Sikhism	468	0.93%	363	0.7%	2,274	3.43%	901	1.33%	3,636	5.21%	2,686	3.78%	3,003	3.37%	4,676	3.46%	185,869	21.39%
Christianity	77	0.15%	—N/a	—N/a	1,569	2.37%	1,543	2.28%	1,440	2.06%	1,322	1.86%	1,533	1.72%	977	0.72%	8,889	1.02%
Jainism	—N/a	—N/a	373	0.72%	347	0.52%	471	0.7%	438	0.63%	477	0.67%	1,014	1.14%	768	0.57%	3,203	0.37%
Zoroastrianism	—N/a	—N/a	—N/a	—N/a	3	0%	22	0.03%	18	0.03%	9	0.01%	70	0.08%	—N/a	—N/a	—N/a	—N/a
Buddhism	—N/a	—N/a	—N/a	—N/a	0	0%	0	0%	0	0%	0	0%	0	0%	—N/a	—N/a	1,407	0.16%
Others	0	0%	1,543	2.96%	0	0%	2	0%	0	0%	0	0%	0	0%	245	0.18%	5,954	0.69%
Total population	50,067	100%	52,119	100%	66,202	100%	67,735	100%	69,818	100%	71,008	100%	89,030	100%	135,283	100%	868,929	100%

Languages spoken in Jalandhar city (2011)
1. Punjabi (81.5%)
2. Hindi (15.6%)
3. Others (2.89%)

At the time of the 2011 census, 81.48% of the population spoke Punjabi and 15.63% Hindi as their first language.

== Economy ==
Jalandhar is notable for its sports goods industry. With an employment of 60,000 to 70,000 people, it is estimated to be ₹1,700 crore industry, with ₹400 crore export and ₹1,300 crore domestic supply. In 2022, the Sports Goods Manufacturers and Exporters Association in Jalandhar, with collaboration from local self-help groups, started an initiative to train 1,500 women in stitching soccer balls, ensuring financial development and welfare in the district.

Another significant contributor to Jalandhar's economy is its leather industry, having a turn over of ₹1,200 to ₹1,500 crore, and ₹400 crore export.

=== Smart City Project ===
In the second phase of the Indian Government's Smart City Project, Jalandhar has been selected to participate, marking a pivotal shift in the city's development.

== Municipal finance ==
According to financial data published on the CityFinance Portal of the Ministry of Housing and Urban Affairs, the Jalandhar Municipal Corporation reported total revenue receipts of ₹353 crore (US$42 million) and total expenditure of ₹316 crore (US$38 million) in 2022–23. Tax revenue accounted for about 13.9% of the total revenue, while the corporation received ₹238 crore in grants during the financial year.

== Transport ==
=== By air ===
The nearest airport is Adampur Airport, northwest of Jalandhar, which currently only handles scheduled operation on maiden flights of the private carrier Spicejet, to Delhi, Mumbai and Jaipur. The nearest fully-fledged International Airport is Sri Guru Ram Das Ji International Airport, in Amritsar. It is the second busiest airport in North India, and is connected to other parts of the country by regular flights. Several airlines operate flights from abroad, including London Stansted, Birmingham, Dubai, Singapore, Kuala Lumpur, and Doha. The airport handles as many as 48 flights every week up from the occasional, intermittent ones some years ago.

=== By rail ===
Direct train service is available for other major cities like Mumbai, Calcutta, Chennai, Patna, Guwahati, Pune, Haridwar, Varanasi, Jaipur, Jhansi, Gwalior, Bhopal and Jammu Tawi. Some prestigious trains that halt in Jalandhar City railway station include the Howrah Mail, Golden Temple Mail (Frontier Mail), New-Delhi Amritsar Shatabdi Express, and the Paschim Express. Now, many trains of Jammu route are extended up to Mata Vaishno Devi-Katra.

Jalandhar City Railway Station is well-connected to other parts of the country. Jalandhar City is a major stop between the Amritsar-Delhi rail link, which is serviced by Shatabdi Express, Intercity Express, among others.

Direct Services to major cities such as Mumbai, Calcutta, Chennai, Patna, Guwahati, Pune, Haridwar, Varanasi, Jaipur and Jammu Tawi are available. There are prestigious services such as the Howrah Mail, Golden Temple Mail (Frontier Mail), New-Delhi Amritsar Shatabdi Express, Paschim Express.

=== By road ===
There is one of the largest networks of bus services of Punjab at Shaheed-e-Azam, Sardar Bhagat Singh ISBT (Jalandhar), Himachal Pradesh, Delhi, Haryana, Pepsu, Chandigarh, Uttar Pradesh, Himachal Pradesh, Jammu & Kashmir, Uttrakhand, Rajasthan State Roadways, apart from private operators.

== Religious places ==
- Shri Paramhans Adwait Matt Ashram, Shri Anandpur Wale, St. No. 3, Central Town (organised by Shri Shabad Punitanand ji (Veena Bai ji)
- Historical temple of Shri Bawa Lal, Dayal Mandir, Partap Bagh
- Shaktipeeth Mata Tripura Malini ji Dhaam
- Church of Signs and Wonders
- Gurudwara Dukh Niwaran Sahib Dham
- Gurdwara Guru Ravidass Dham
- Devi Talab Mandir
- Dera Baba Murad Shah
- Gurdwara Guru Ravidas, Guru Ramdas Nagar
- Dera Sach Khand
- Gurdwara Singh Sabha
- Gurdwara Guru Tegh Bahadur Nagar
- Geeta Mandir Jalandhar

== Media ==
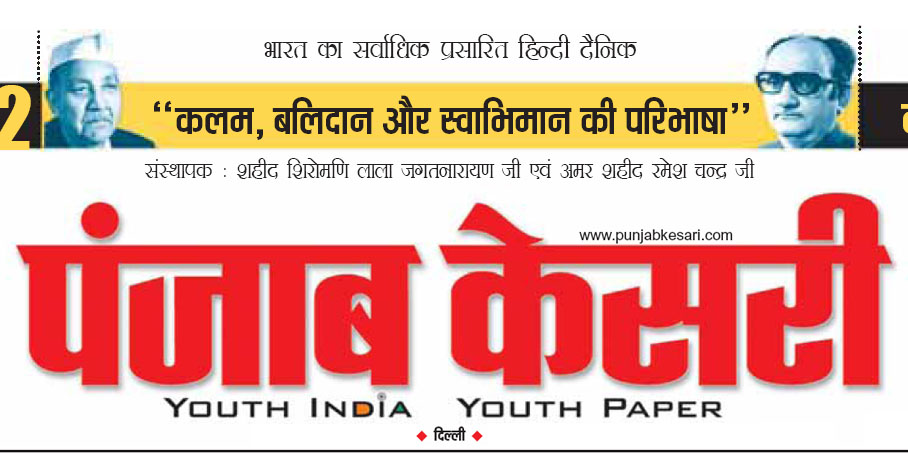
Punjab Kesari header with the photos of its founders, Lala Jagat Narain and Romesh Chander.

Jag Bani

Doordarshan Kendra, Jalandhar is an Indian television station in Jalandhar, owned and operated by state-owned Doordarshan, the television network of Prasar Bharati (Broadcasting Corporation of India). It was established in 1979 and produces and broadcasts the 24-hour Punjabi language TV channel, DD Punjabi, which was launched in 1998 and covers most of the state of Punjab, India.

The city is the region's headquarters for newspapers, national television and radio stations. These include Daily Ajit, Jagbani, Punjab Kesari, Dainik Bhaskar, Dainik Jagran, Hindustan Times, The Tribune, Truescoop News, Hind Samachar, etc.

State-owned All India Radio has a local station in Jalandhar that transmits programs of mass interest. FM local radio stations include:

- Radio city 91.9 MHz
- BIG FM 92.7 92.7 MHz
- 94.3 FM-My Fm- 94.3 MHz
- Radio Mirchi 98.3 MHz
- All India Radio 102.7 MHz

== Healthcare ==
The Municipal Corporation of Jalandhar claims that the city has over 800 medical facilities, making it the city with the highest number of medical facilities per capita in Asia. Three new health centres were set up in Jalandhar on 9 September 2020.

== Sports ==
=== Cricket ===
Cricket is very popular in the grounds and streets of Jalandhar. There is an international-standard stadium at Gandhi Stadium, formerly known as Burlton Park. The Indian cricket team played a Test Match against the Pakistan cricket team on this ground on 24 September 1983.

=== Kabaddi ===
Major Kabaddi matches are usually held at Guru Gobind Singh Stadium.

=== Guru Gobind Singh Stadium ===
Guru Gobind Singh Stadium is a multi-purpose stadium in Jalandhar. It is usually used for football matches and served as the home stadium of JCT Mills FC. People can be seen jogging, playing soccer, weight-lifting, etc. in the stadium most of the time. The Punjab government has started new projects at the stadium.

=== Surjit Hockey Stadium ===
Surjeet Hockey Stadium is a field hockey stadium in Jalandhar, Punjab, India. It is named after Jalandhar-born Olympian Surjit Singh. This stadium is home of the franchise Sher-e-Punjab of the World Series Hockey.

=== Sports college ===
There is a Government Sports College in the city and it is a focus for many of the National Sports Councils. In this college, many sports are played like cricket, hockey, swimming, volleyball and basketball.

== Education ==
Higher education institutions in Jalandhar include;

=== Universities ===
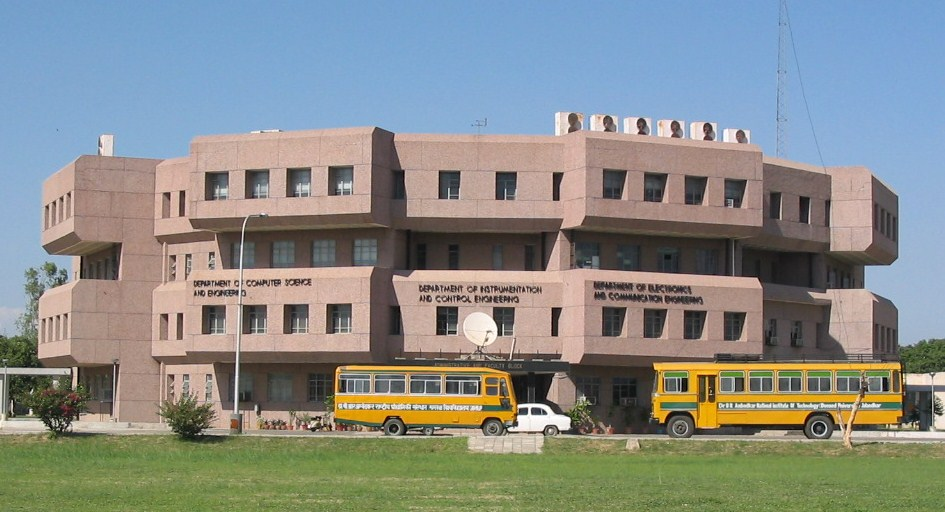
Dr. B. R. Ambedkar National Institute of Technology Jalandhar

- DAV Institute of Engineering and Technology
- DAV University
- Doaba College
- Dr. B. R. Ambedkar National Institute of Technology Jalandhar
- GNA University
- Guru Nanak Dev University
- I. K. Gujral Punjab Technical University
- Lovely Professional University
- Kanya Maha Vidyalaya
- Mehr Chand Polytechnic College
- Punjab Institute of Medical Sciences

== Notable people ==
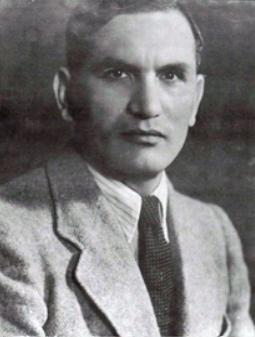
Jahangir Khan – first-class cricketer and javelin thrower

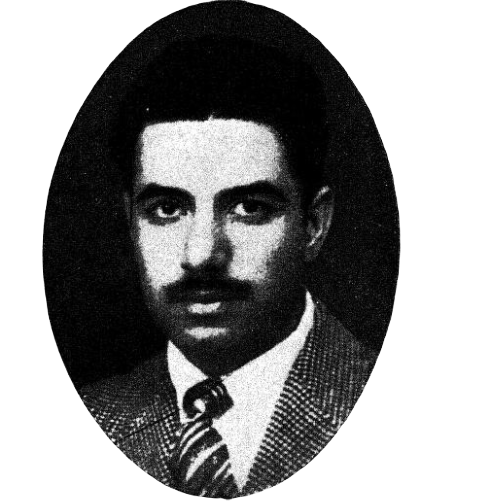
Ahmed Raza – Civil servant and first-class cricketer

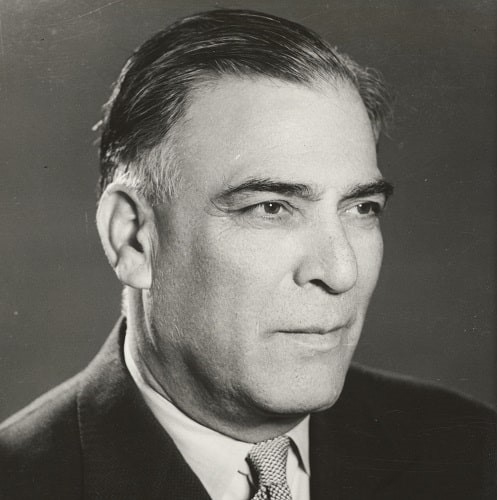
Wajid Ali Khan Burki – Pakistani ophthalmologist and Army Medical Corps general

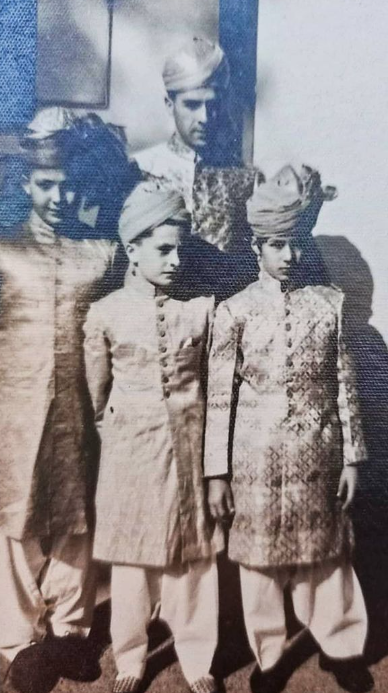
Jamshed Burki – Pakistan Army Captain and Interior Secretary of Pakistan

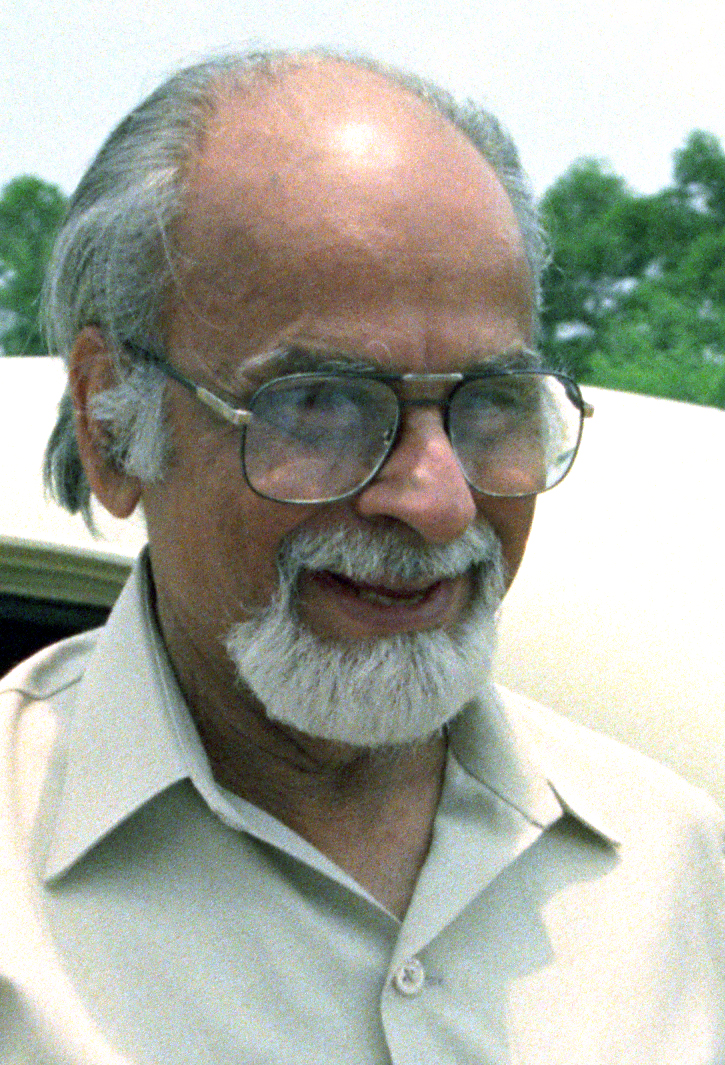
I. K. Gujral – 12th Prime Minister of India

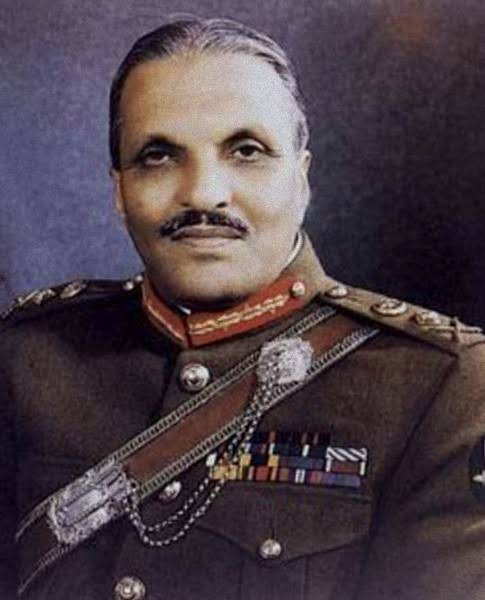
Zia-Ul-Haq – 6th President of Pakistan and 2nd Chief of Army Staff (Pakistan)

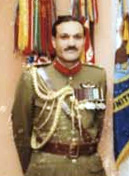
Khalid Mahmud Arif – Vice Chief of the Army Staff (Pakistan)

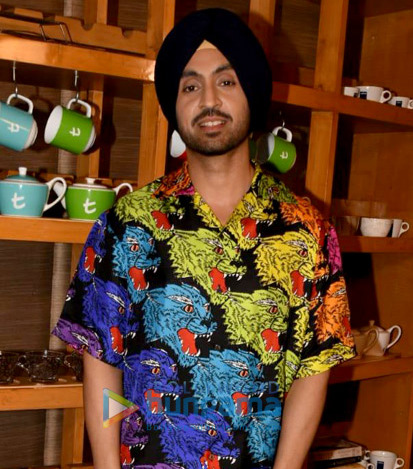
Diljit Dosanjh

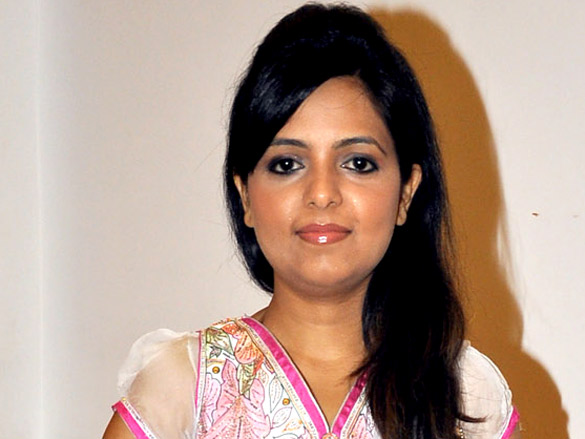
Sugandha Mishra

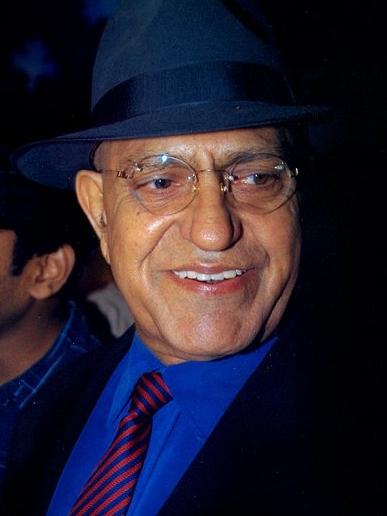
Amrish Puri

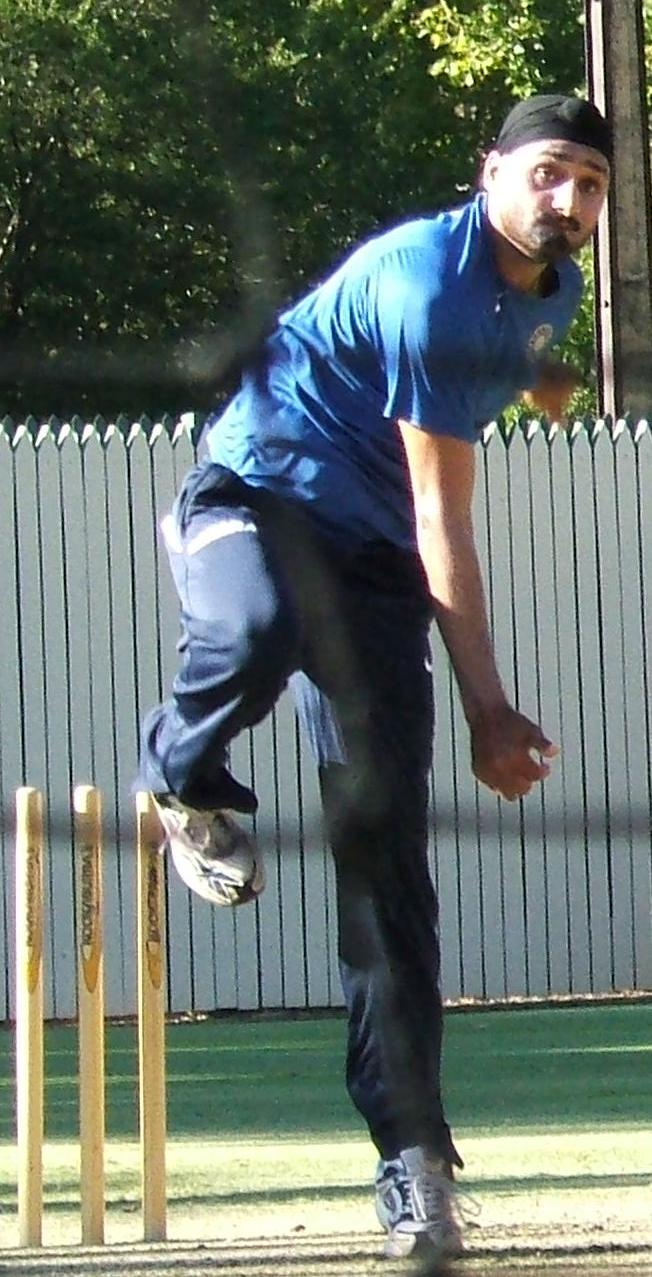
Harbhajan Singh

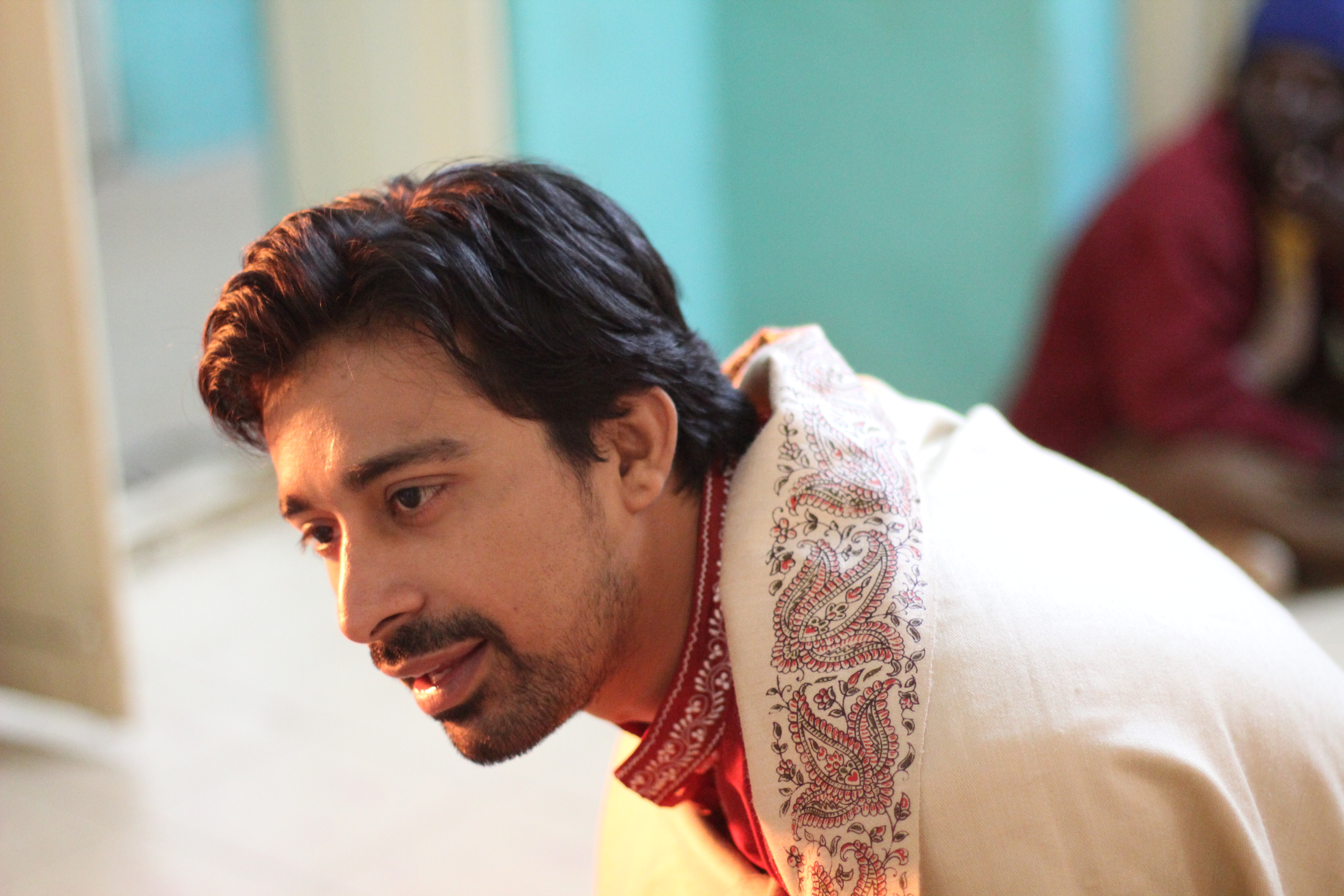
Rannvijay Singh

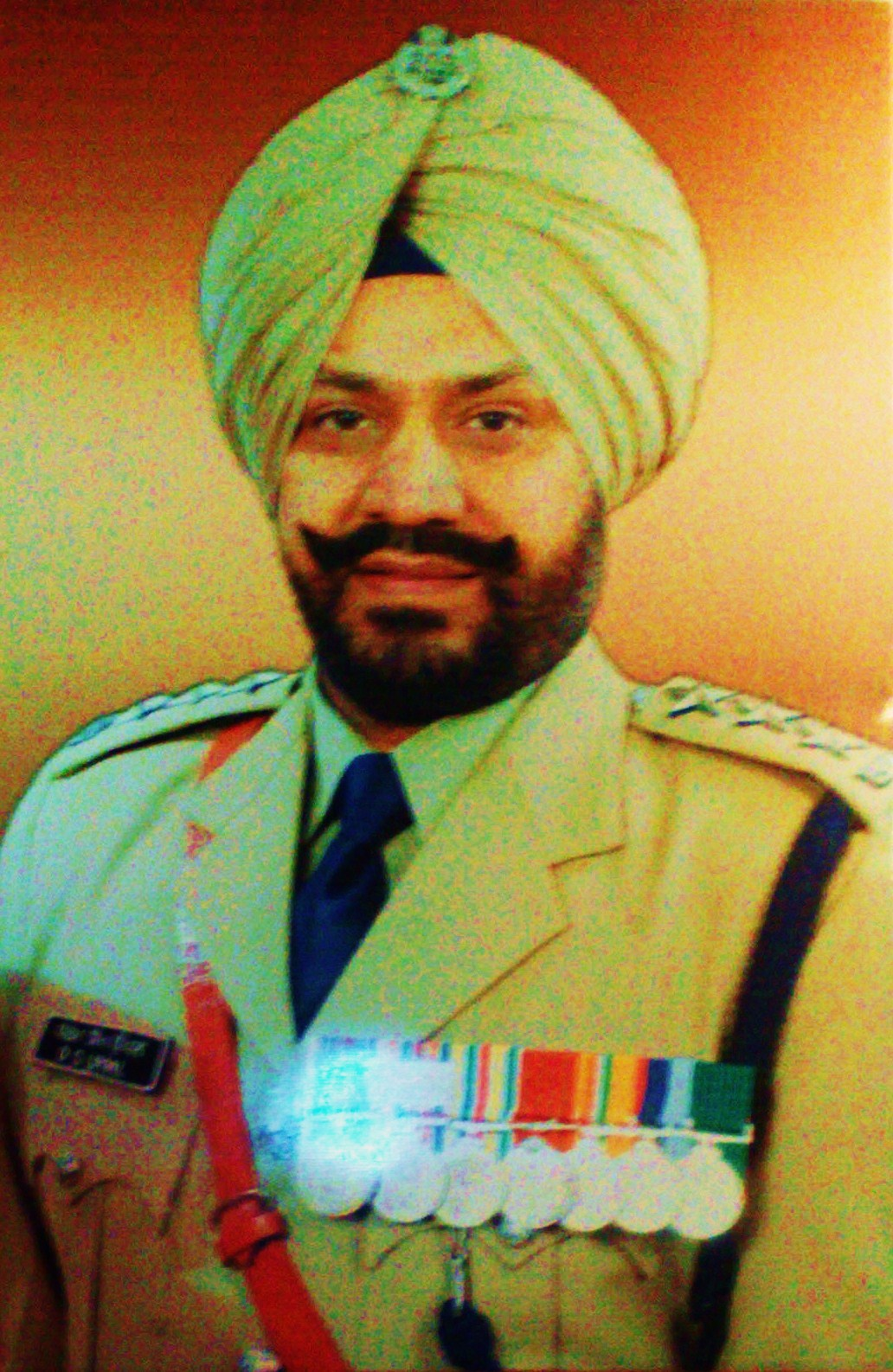
Dharam Singh Uppal

Name	Occupation
Yash Chopra	Producer/Director
Anurag Singh (director)	Director, Producer, Writer
Diljit Dosanjh	Actor, Singer
Karambir Singh	24th Chief of Naval Staff of Indian Navy
Ranbir Singh Kanwar	Sugarcane Researcher, Director of Research (Agriculture) PAU, Director of Research Himachal Pradesh Agricultural University
Lawrence Durrell	Expatriate British novelist, poet, dramatist, and travel writer
Vanya Mishra	Winner of Miss India Femina 2012
Sunil Dutt	Actor
Kundan Lal Saigal	Actor/Singer
Amrish Puri	Actor
Jazzy B	Singer
Apache Indian	Singer
Sarbjit Cheema	Singer
Kanth Kaler	Singer
Karan Mehra	Actor
Nooran Sisters	Singers
Master Saleem	Singer
Hans Raj Hans	Singer
Jagjit Singh	Singer
Bahadur Singh	Indian former shot putter who won gold medal
General Muhammad Zia-ul-Haq	Chief of Army Staff, fourth Chief Martial Law Administrator and the sixth President of Pakistan
Diwan Bhai Abdul Hamid	Revenue and Chief Minister of Kapurthala State
Hafeez Jullundhri	Writer and poet
Baba Kashmira Singh	Head of Sidhant Sant Samaj or Gurbani
Paul Nischal	NRI President, first Indian candidate for the British Political Party
Col. Balbir Singh Kular	Hockey Player
Varinder Singh Ghuman	Bodybuilder, Wrestler and Punjabi Film Actor
Ajit Pal Singh	Hockey Player
Pargat Singh	Hockey Player
Inder Kumar Gujral	Former Prime Minister of India
Harbhajan Singh	Cricketer
Wasim Sajjad	Two-time Acting President of Pakistan, Ex-Chairman of Senate
Sheikh Anwarul Haq	Former Chief Justice
Mian Mohammed Sharif	Surveyor General
Lala Amarnath	Cricketer
Sushil Kohli	Swimmer
Lala Jagat Narain	Freedom fighter and founder of Punjab Kesri
Basheer Hussain Najafi	One of the six Grand Ayatollahs
Taruwar Kohli	Cricketer
Swaran Singh	Politician
Udham Singh (field hockey)	Hockey Player
Avneet Kaur	Actress
Darshan Singh (field hockey)	Hockey Player
Salma Mumtaz	Actress
Saurav Mandal	Football player
Ashwini Kumar Chopra	Journalist, Politician (MP-Karnal)
Kartar Singh Duggal	Writer
Kulwant Singh Virk	Writer
Ishar Singh (poet)	Poet
Sadhu Singh Hamdard	Freedom fighter and Writer
Prem Parkash	Writer
Ajit Saini	Writer and Army General
Hasrat	Writer
Gurbachan Singh Talib	Writer
Gurdial Singh	Writer and novelist
Chaudhry Muhammad Ali	Former Prime Minister of Pakistan
Swami Shraddhanand	Indian educationist and an Arya Samaj missionary
Wazir Ali	Cricketer
R. Paul Dhillon	Indo-Canadian journalist
Arun Shourie	Politician, author, and journalist
Agha Sadiq	Writer and poet
Fateh Ali Khan	Singer. Father of Nusrat Fateh Ali Khan
Dharam Singh Uppal	Athlete
Balbir Singh Sr.	Hockey Player
Mandeep Singh	Cricketer
Vimi	Actress
Ranvir Shorey	Actor
Sugandha Mishra	Singer, Anchor, Comedian
Nalini Priyadarshni	Poet, Writer
Vijay Sampla	State Minister in Union Govt
Bhagat Chunni Lal	Minister in Punjab Govt
Ram Kapoor	Indian Actor
Buta Singh	Ex-Home Minister of India
Sukhbir Singh	Punjabi Musician, Singer
Amarjit Kaypee	Former highest run scorer in Ranji Trophy (Cricket)
Akshaye Khanna	Indian Actor
Surbhi Jyoti	Indian Actress
Jyotica Tangri	Playback singer, appeared in several reality TV shows
Lord Wilberforce	British Judge
Jass Manak	Singer
Manpreet Singh	Hockey Player
Garry Sandhu	Singer
Akhil	Singer
Jasmine Sandlas	Singer
Iqbal Preet Singh Sahota	Former DGP and State Police Chief of Punjab
Mohinder Singh Kaypee	Former Member Parliament and Cabinet Minister
Santokh Singh Chaudhary	Former Member Parliament
Darshan Singh Kaypee	Former Cabinet Minister who was shot dead by Khalistani terrorists
Som Parkash	Former Union Minister, Government of India
Jagjit Singh (politician)	Former Cabinet Minister, Punjab
Sarwan Singh Phillaur	Former Cabinet Minister of Punjab
Avinash Chander	Former Member of Legislative Assembly, Punjab
Rajinder Johar	Philanthropist with quadriplegia
Rachel Gupta	Model and Miss Grand International 2024
