= Geeta Mandir Jalandhar =

Indian temple

Geeta Mandir, Jalandhar
- गीता मंदिर
- Location in Punjab

Religion
- Affiliation: Hinduism
- Deity: Krishna

Location
- Location: Jalandhar
- State: Punjab
- Country: India
- Coordinates: 31.3069°N 75.5804°E

Website
- https://geeta-mandir.e-temple.in

The Geeta Mandir is a Hindu temple located at Model Town, Jalandhar, city of Punjab, India. It is dedicated to Lord Krishna. Located in Model town, it is one of the most visited temples in the Jalandhar city after Devi Talab Mandir.

== History ==
Geeta Mandir is dedicated to Lord Krishna and is located near Nikku Park in model town, Jalandhar, Punjab. The temple has a statue of Shree Radha Krishna in the center and about 10 more Deities around it. The temple is crowded during Janmastami festival. The temple is famous for its spiritual enlightenment.
