= Sahota (surname) =

Sahota is a surname. Notable people with the surname include:

- Kuldip Sahota, Baron Sahota (born 1951), British politician
- Mukhtar Sahota
- Ruby Sahota, Canadian politician
- Roshni Sahota, Indian television and film actress
- Iqbal Preet Singh Sahota, Indian police officer
- Sunjeev Sahota (born 1981), British novelist
- Jessy Sahota, Canadian politician
- Harvinder Sahota (born 1941), Indian American cardiologist
- Gadowar Singh Sahota (born 1954), Canadian wrestler
- Patty Sahota (1969–2024), Canadian politician
- Jag Sahota (born 1978), Canadian politician
- Onkar Sahota, British Labour Party politician

== See also ==
- Sahota
- Sahotas
- Saha (surname)
