= DAV Institute of Engineering and Technology =

Private engineering institute in Jalandhar, Punjab, India

- Other name: DAVIET
- Established: 2001
- Religious affiliation: Dayanand Anglo-Vedic College Trust and Management Society
- Principal: Sudhir Sharma (officiating principal)
- Location: Jalandhar, Punjab, India; 31°20′43.64″N 75°33′15.39″E
- Campus: Urban 18 acres (0.1 km^{2})
- Language: English, Punjabi, Hindi
- Website: davietjal.org

DAV Institute of Engineering and Technology (DAVIET) is a private engineering institute in Jalandhar city of Punjab, India. It is established by the Dayanand Anglo-Vedic College Trust and Management Society offering undergraduate and post-graduate programmes. The DAV College Trust and Management Society is the largest non-government educational organization in India, managing a chain of about 700 institutions in India and abroad. The institute is located in the heart of city adjacent to DAV College, Jalandhar, on the left side of the Jalandhar-Amritsar National Highway.

The institute is approved by AICTE All India Council for Technical Education and affiliated to IK Gujral Punjab Technical University, Jalandhar. It received ISO 9001:2000 certification in 2005 under joint accreditation of SGS Group and UKAS (United Kingdom Accreditation Service) Quality Management. It has received 'A+' NAAC Accreditation in the year 2024.

== Academics ==
The institute offers following graduate and post graduate programs.

Undergraduate Departments and Programmes

- Computer Science and Engineering (AI & ML) - B.Tech. CSE (AI & ML) ( 180 Regular Seats + 6 LEET )
- Computer Science and Engineering - B.Tech. CSE ( 180 Regular Seats + 12 LEET )
- Electronics and Communication Engineering - B.Tech. ECE ( 60 Regular Seats + 6 LEET )
- Mechanical Engineering - B.Tech. ME ( 60 Regular Seats + 6 LEET )
- Electrical Engineering - B.Tech. EE ( 60 Regular Seats + 6 LEET )
- Civil Engineering B.Tech. CE ( 60 Regular Seats + 6 LEET )
- Applied Sciences
- Computer Applications - BCA ( 120 Regular Seats )
- Business Management & Commerce - BBA ( 60 Regular Seats ) & B.Com. ( 60 Regular Seats )
- Hospitality and Tourism Management - BHMCT ( 120 Regular Seats ) & BTTM ( 30 Regular Seats )

Postgraduate Departments and Programmes

- Computer Science and Engineering ( AI & ML ) - M.Tech. CSE (AI & ML) ( 18 Regular Seats )
- Civil Engineering - M.Tech. CE (Structural Engineering) ( 18 Regular Seats )
- Business Management - MBA ( 90 Regular Seats )
- Computer Applications - MCA (30 Regular Seats)

The institute has a research foundation to promote research capabilities under various areas of Engineering and Technology. The Centre of Incubation and Entrepreneurship was established to promote a culture of entrepreneurship among students.

== National rankings ==
- Ranked 10th in the category of outstanding engineering colleges of excellence in India in Competition Success Review-GHRDC Engineering Colleges Survey 2016.
- Best Engineering College of Punjab Technical University 2013
- Ranked 2nd in Most Promising Engineering Institute as per Competition Success Review–GHRDC Rankings 2009
- A survey by Dataquest on top technical schools in India placed DAVIET at 60th All India Rank. The survey containing the national rankings was released on 22 December 2009.
- Best DAV Institute Award by D.A.V. College Managing Committee, New Delhi in 2005*
- DAVIET is the coveted winner of the IMC Ramkrishna Bajaj National Quality Commendation Certificate 2006

== Conferences ==
- National Congress on Science-Technology and Management (DAV-NCSTM) 2014
- National Seminar on Communication and Soft Skills - The Emerging Paradigms - 2010
- National Conference on Modern Management Practices and Information Technology Trends (MMPITT) - 2009
- National Conference on Optical and Wireless Communication (NCOW) - 2008
- 10th Punjab Science Congress - 2007

== See also ==
- Arya Samaj
