= Agha Sadiq =

Pakistani writer and poet

Syed Agha Sadiq Hussien Naqvi (25 September 1909–1977) was a Pakistani writer and poet, based in Quetta, Pakistan, from 1943 up to his death in July 1977.

== History ==
He was born in Jalandhar, Punjab, in 1909 as the son of Syed Khair Ali Shah and grandson of Syed Ahmed Ali Shah. Mostly self-educated and schooled in the family compound, he began to take up posts in the education establishment as the British withdrew from India.

== Works ==
He was responsible for 40 works through his lifetime, in four different languages, dominated by Urdu but including Arabic, Persian and Middle-Persian. His work is distinctive if in its balance, elegance and depth of thought and is modelled clearly on his great hero Iqbal. He acknowledges his debt in his extensive analysis of Iqbal's poetry "Iqbal Shinaasi". Through collections such as "Parishaan" and the sufistic/religiously inspired "Chasm-e-Kauthar" demonstrate that he had a style and voice uniquely his own.

Although born to a privileged home and enjoying a comfortable life he was always driven by the needs of the poor and oppressed. This meant he steered a course away from poetry based on love or courtly form to focus on the needs of those he considered voiceless.

He was known as a poet but his work was not limited to poetry. He was an expert in the music, rhythm and its relation to poetry writing "Arooz" still regarded as one of the premier works on the technical aspect or Urdu poetry. "Nikaat-E-Fun" was a posthumous publication of "Arooz" and two other volumes and essay on Music and poetry by his sons Syed Hasan Javed Naqvi and Syed Naveed Hasan.

== Conclusion ==
Although he has since been largely forgotten due to literary fashions and time, as a man he was respected by colleagues like Ahmed Nadeem Qasmi and students such as Ashoor Kazmi and Akbar Ahmed. His ability in the Urdu language and his linguistic expertise, as well as his knowledge seeking nature made him one of the most respected men in his field and a man whose work lives on in the minds and hearts of those who truly love the Urdu language. He served as Professor of Persian language in Government College Quetta, Principle of Government College Gojra (Punjab), Principle of Government College Mustong (Baluchistan), Principle of Government College Muzaffar Ghar (Punjab) before his retirement from Government service.

He was survived by two sons:

- Syed Javed Hasan Naqvi (b. 1935 d.2006)
- Syed Naveed Hasan (b. 1940 d.2007)
