= Dharam Singh Uppal =

Indian athlete and police officer

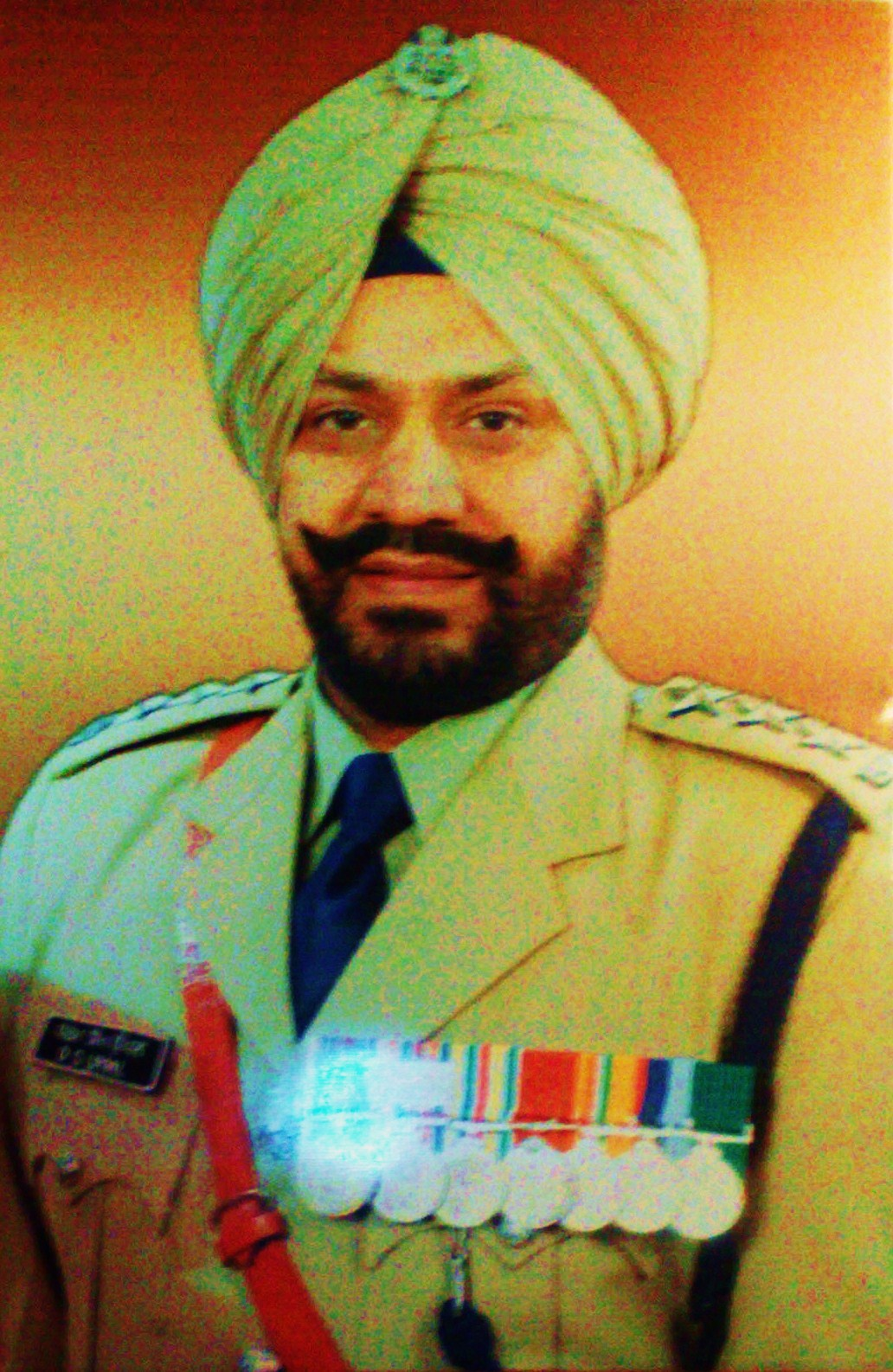
- Born: 21 July 1959; Amritsar, Punjab, India
- Died: 15 January 2013; Jalandhar, Punjab, India
- Citizenship: Indian
- Occupation: Police officer
- Known for: SuperintendentPunjab Police
- Website: Punjab Police Official Website

Dharam Singh Uppal (21 July 1959 - 16 January 2013) was a former Indian international track and field athlete and a Superintendent of Police in Punjab. He was in the field event of men's 800 m and 1500 m race and won several medals for the country as well as state. He represented India in Asian Games and South Asian Games. Due to a major accident, he could not carry on with his sports and joined Punjab Police. He had been posted as a DSP (Deputy Superintendent of Police) in Bathinda, Jalandhar, Hoshiarpur, Kapurthala districts of Punjab. He hails from Amritsar in Punjab but residing in Jalandhar district.

Uppal was also awarded with the President Gallantry Police Medal for his achievements.
