= Mehr Chand Polytechnic College =

College in Punjab, India

- Motto: A Dream Polytechnic
- Type: Diploma college
- Established: 1950
- Parent institution: DAV College Managing Committee, New Delhi
- Principal: Dr Jagroop singh
- Students: 900 Morning, Evening shift
- Location: Jalandhar, Punjab, India
- Affiliations: Punjab State Board of Technical Education and Industrial Training, Chandigarh
- Website: mcpolyjal.com

Mehr Chand Polytechnic College is a college located in the Jalandhar, Punjab.

In 1950, Shri Chanchal Dass, who was working as Principal of Dayanand Polytechnic Institute at Amritsar, took over the college from Shri Hans Raj Kundra. This action led by D.A.V. College Managing Committee led to the technical side of education being established at Jalandhar. In 1952, the institution was shifted to the work centre on the G.T. Later, this building belonging to the Industries Department, Punjab, was purchased by the D.A.V. College, Chanchal Dass and renovated to have the existing building today.

In 2003, 2007, 2011, 2014, 2015, 2016 and 2017, it received the award for best polytechnic college in the northern region. The principal of the college received the Rashtriya Vidya Saraswati Puraskar in 2010. In 2023, the college bagged the award for 'Best Quality Polytechnic College'.

In 1994 it was ISO 9002 certified.

== Currently ==
In 2016, it was second after "Thapar Polytechnic patiala" in placement of students. The auditorium and new well-equipped lab are under-construction by college.

== Courses offered ==
Morning shift	Evening shift
Civil Eng.	Civil Eng.
Electrical Eng.	Electrical Eng.
Mechanical Eng.	Mechanical Eng.
Electronics & Commn. Eng	Electronics & Commn. Eng
Computer Engineering	Computer Engineering
Automobile Engineering

Pharmacy

== Eligibility criteria ==
The Candidates having passed the Matriculation exam (especially in mathematics, science and English) are eligible to seek admission in the engineering on the basis of inter-se-merit of JET and the reservation policy of Govt. of Punjab through online counselling while for pharmacy student must have passed 12th in science stream .

15 percent of the seats in each discipline are reserved under minority quota Arya Samaji.

== LEET Entry ==
(15 percent of total seats are reserved for Lateral entry students in second year.)

Eligibility: All those candidates who have passed the following examinations would be eligible for consideration for Lateral Entry in various Diploma Courses.

1) ITI at least with one year (who have passed 10th Level School leaving examination before admission to ITI courses) with a minimum 60% marks from any institution of Punjab/Other state.

2) 10 + 2 vocational examination in various branches with the minimum 60% marks from any institution of Punjab/Other State.

3) 10 + 2 (PCM) with the minimum of 60% marks from any institution of Punjab/Other State.

4) Two year certificate course with a minimum 60% marks from SLIET Longowal and have Punjab Domicile.In the event of vacancies lying unfilled, candidates who have passed the ITI at least with one year (who have passed 10th level School leaving examination before admission to ITI Courses) or 10 + 2 Board shall also be eligible to be considered for admission.

== Curriculum ==
All these courses except Pharmacy are on semester system basis and admission to the Diploma courses is made strictly based on JET( Joint Entrance Test), conducted by the State Board of Technical Education & Industrial. Training Punjab, Chandigarh. Pharmacy is on annual system and admission is on merit in the qualifying examination i.e. 10+2 (Medical/non-medical).
