= Rajinder Johar =

- Born: 19 January 1948 (age 78); Jalandhar, Punjab, India
- Occupation: Social Service
- Organization: Family of Disabled
- Known for: Family of Disabled (FOD)
- Awards: public welfare
- Website: familyofdisable.org/

Rajinder Johar was an Indian philanthropist with quadriplegia who runs an NGO called Family of Disabled (FoD), which looks after the betterment of disabled persons in Delhi.

== Life ==
Rajinder Johar was born on 19 January 1948 in Jalandhar, Punjab, India. He served King George Medical College, Lucknow, India, as Occupational Therapist. As a result of a bullet injury in 1986 in an attempted robbery in his house, Johar was left paralyzed with limited mobility. After six years of depression, he decided to help disabled people become self-sufficient and thus founded the Family of Disabled. Johar's service of disabled people over two decades won him several awards and accolades. He died on 1 February 2018 and despite his 100% disability worked for the cause of disabled till his last breath.

== Family of Disabled ==
Family of Disabled (FOD) was founded in 1992 by Johar, who has been bedridden for the last 22 years. Based in New Delhi, FOD's mission is to build and nurture the capacities of persons with disabilities through different sustainable interventions for improving their quality of life, making them self-reliant and facilitating their mainstreaming.
