= Kanya Maha Vidyalaya =

Kanya Maha Vidyalaya (The Heritage Autonomous Institution )
- Kanya Maha Vidyalaya, Jalandhar (The Heritage Autonomous Institution)
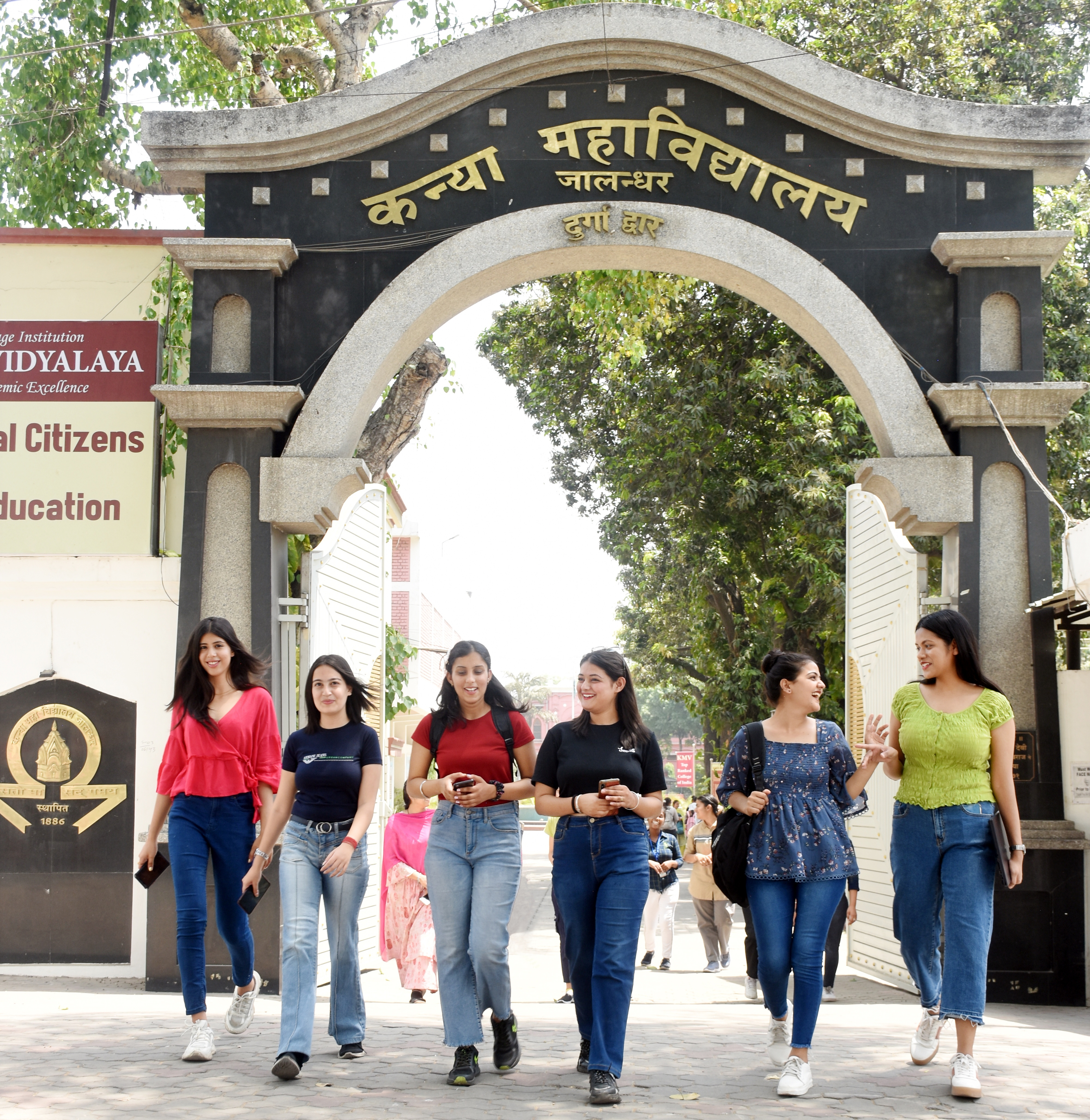
- Other name: KMV
- Established: 1886
- Founder: Lala Dev Raj
- Affiliations: Guru Nanak Dev University (Autonomous now)
- President: Chander Mohan
- Principal: Neeraj Maini
- Location: Jalandhar, Punjab, India; 31.325986°N 75.576262°E
- Campus: 32 acres (13 ha)
- Nickname: KMV
- Website: kmvjalandhar.ac.in

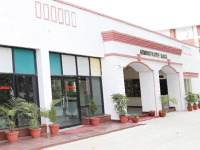
Administrative Block of KMV

Kanya Maha Vidyalaya (The Heritage Autonomous Institution) (KMV) is a women's college located in Jalandhar, Punjab, India, offering undergraduate and postgraduate programmes and diplomas. It has approximately 4000 students and a campus of around 32 acres (13 ha). The current principal is Dr. Neeraj Maini and president of the college is Dhruv Mittal. The pioneer in women education and women liberation in India, Kanya Maha Vidyalaya (The Heritage Autonomous Institution) is mentioned in the book Arya Dharam by an American scholar Kenneth W. Jones. The only college under GNDU to bag Kaushal Kendra (Skill Development Center) awarded by UGC, MHRD Government of India with five B.Voc Courses. The first college in the region to have a Student Exchange Programme which enables KMV undergraduate students shift their grades to Lesley and Chatham University, USA, after first year, to continue their degree.

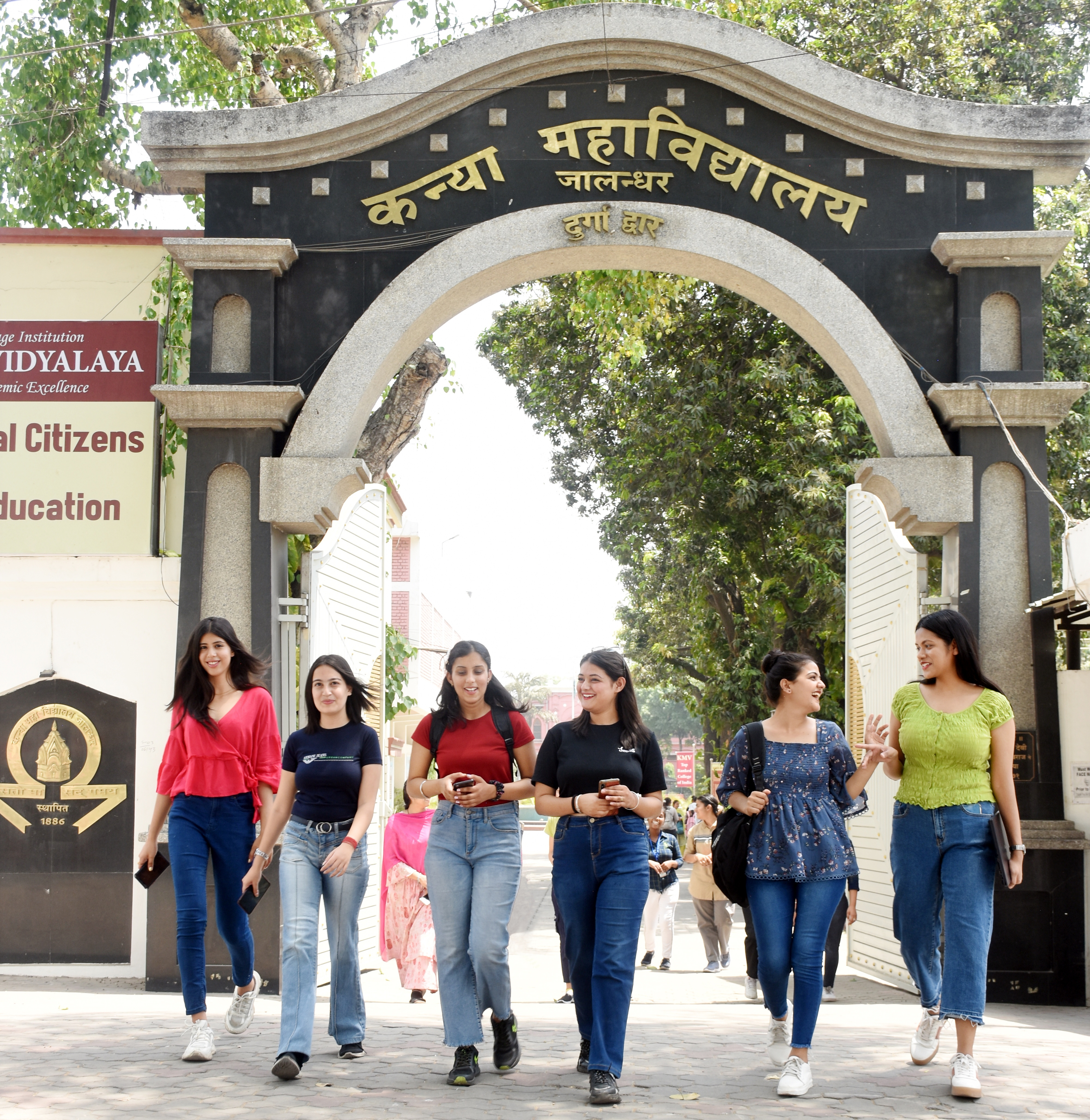
Kanya Maha Vidyalaya (The Heritage Autonomous Institution)

== History ==
The college was established in Jullunder (Punjab, India) in 1890 (some sources say 1886) as Arya Kanya Pathshala, (translated as Arya Girls School) by Lala Dev Raj.

Current Developments Under the Umbrella of DDU Kaushal Kendra, 5 skill development- B.Voc courses namely in Animation, Retail Management, Management and Secretarial Practices, Textile Design and Apparel Technology, Nutrition Exercise and Health are being successfully run since inception in 2015. The prime focus of these courses is practical component and industry exposure through internship/trainings that form part of curriculum.

Recently, KMV has become the first women's college in Punjab state to get Autonomous status from UGC. The college has been awarded Top Rankings by India Today and Outlook Express in 2019,2020 and 2021

The Kanya Maha Vidyalaya (The Heritage Autonomous Institution) has introduced 17 new courses for its students. To upgrade the whole syllabi, introducing reforms and beginning new courses, 27 boards of study were held twice with experts from institutions like Jawaharlal Nehru University, SRCC Delhi, National Stock Exchange, Mumbai, Ethiraj College, Chennai and many other elite universities including GNDU, Amritsar, Punjab University, Chandigarh.

To refine and redefine the syllabus of various vocational courses, an industrial meet was organised by KMV Kaushal Kendra on its campus. KMV got various vocational courses like Artificial Intelligence and Data Science, photography and journalism, animation, retail management, management and secretarial practices, textile design and apparel technology and nutrition, exercise and health. KMV has its own academic council with representatives from GNDU, UGC, Government of India, and many other elite institutions. New job-oriented skill enhancing courses have also been introduced. Around 17 new job-oriented and skill enhancing courses have been introduced, out of which there are 8 PG and 9 under graduate programs which offer job opportunities to the students. The total number of PG programmes has risen to 19.

391 / 5,000

== Translation results ==
New PG courses include BSC Medical Laboratory Technology, MSc Chemistry, M.Sc. Zoology, MA Psychology, MA (JMC), Master of Fine Arts, Master of Aesthetics, MA Dance MA Punjabi. UG programs (after +2), B.Com. (Hons), BA (Hons) English, BSc Economics (specializing in banking), PHC - Punjabi based base for non-PSEB students in other states among others.
