= Competition Success Review =

Competition Success Review, often abbreviated as CSR, is a general knowledge magazine in India aimed at students who wish to appear for Union Public Service Commission exams. Its content includes general knowledge with a focus on Indian current events, tips for college interviews, interviews with IAS high-rankers, interview and GD tips and sample question papers for different competitive examinations. It was first published in 1964 as a pull-out supplement. One study found that around 61% of secondary students in Allahabad city read the magazine.
