= Ranbir Singh Kanwar =

Indian agriculturalist

Dr. Ranbir Singh Kanwar (20 December 1930 – 20 December 2005) was an eminent plant breeder and agronomist who helped usher in the green revolution in India (http://www.sugarcaneindia.com/r_s_kanwar.html). He obtained his Ph.D. from Ohio State University, Columbus under a joint Indo-US development program. His major contribution was in the area of breeding sugarcane varieties which yielded higher sugar and were early maturing. His most remarkable variety was Co.J. 64 which brought back the dwindling sugar industry in North India out of the doldrums in the 1970s (http://www.sugarcaneindia.com/pg3.html).

His most outstanding research contributions were the development of CO.J. 64, CO.J. 83 and CO.J. 85 (CO - Coimbatore, J - Jalandhar: Naming done by abbreviating these two cities in India where the varieties were bred, Flowering of sugarcane crop occurs only in Coimbatore's climate.) These are three exceptional early maturing high sugar content varieties: Notable Contributions of Kanwar were:

- Introduction of polythene-bag technique for quick seed multiplication (http://www.sugarcaneindia.com/pg9.html).
- Inter-cropping technology with wider inter-row spacing (http://www.sugarcaneindia.com/pg10.html).
- Development of agro-techniques for raising successful ratoon crop from winter harvested crop and improved nitrogen use efficiency with soil applied insecticides.

He worked in the capacities of Additional Director of Research (Agriculture), Punjab Agricultural University, Ludhiana and as Director of Research (1979–1980) in Himachal Pradesh Agricultural University, Palampur. He gave new directions to agricultural research in the two North Indian states. He also worked as Senior Sugarcane Consultant to Food and Agriculture Organization and undertook international assignments for sugarcane development in Pakistan, Nigeria and Congo.

He died of cancer on his 75th birthday in 2005.
