= Devi Talab Mandir =

Hindu Temple in Punjab, India

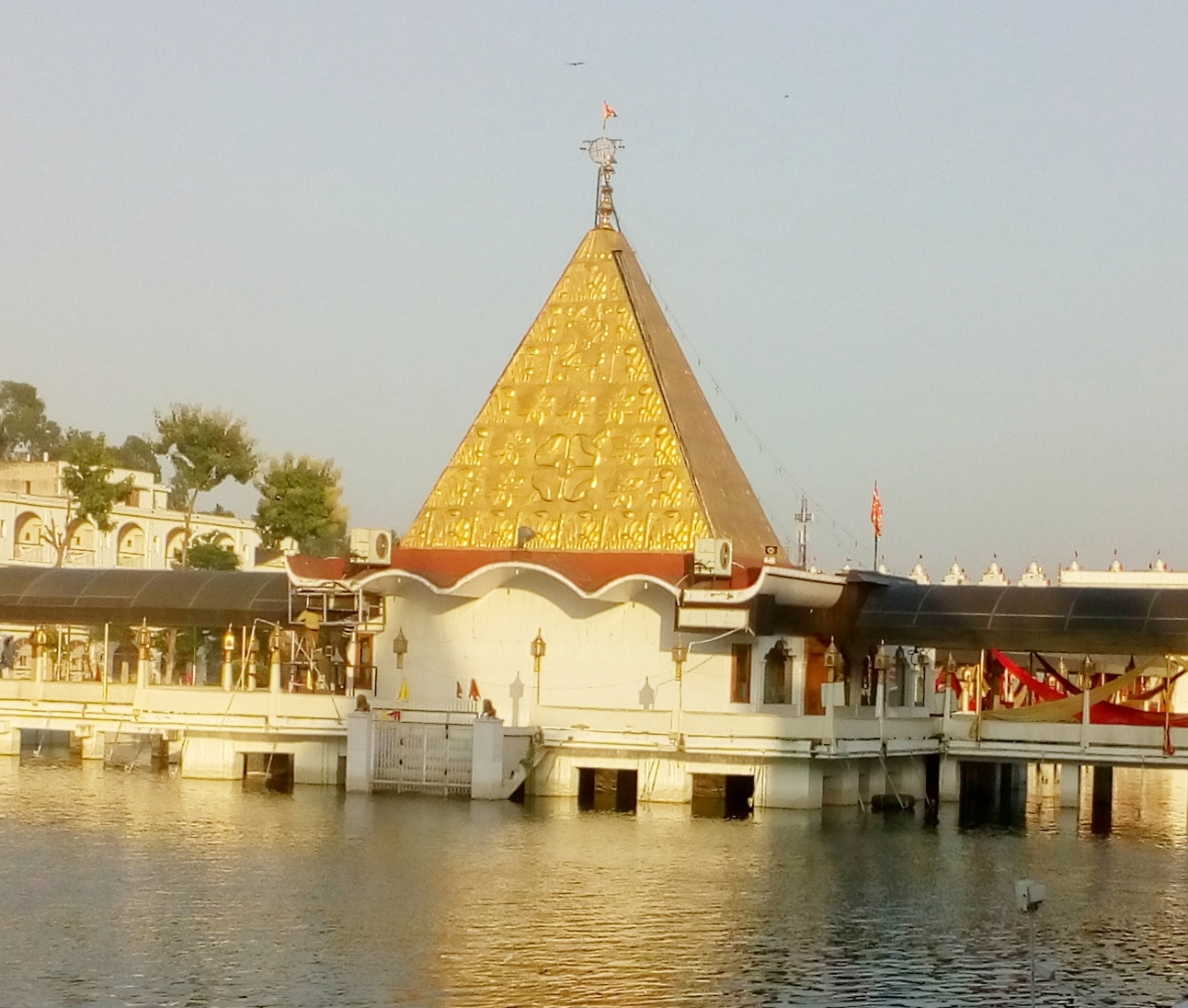

- Location in Punjab

Religion
- Affiliation: Hinduism
- District: Jalandhar
- Deity: Durga
- Festivals: Navratri, Durga puja

Location
- Location: Jalandhar
- State: Punjab
- Country: India
- Interactive map of Devi Talab Mandir
- Coordinates: 31°20′37″N 75°34′59″E

Architecture
- Creator: Sh.Mohan Lal Chopra

Website
- shreedevitalabmandir.org

Devi Talab Mandir is a Hindu temple, located in Jalandhar, Punjab, India. The temple is devoted to Goddess Durga and is visited by thousands of pilgrims every year. It is regarded as one of the 51 Shakta pithas in India. A model of the Amarnath Temple, dedicated to God Shiva, is located within the temple complex. There is an old temple dedicated to Goddess Kali located next to the Mandir. One of the main attractions of the temple is an ancient tank that holds great religious significance for Hindu devotees. The temple has intricate gold work both inside and on its top.

== Places of interest ==
- Maa Durga Mandir
- Charitable Hospital
- Amarnath Cave
- Vaishno Devi Cave
- A big beautiful Pond
- Food Canteen
- Kali Mata Mandir
- Ram Hall
- Hari Vallabh Sangeet Sanmelan
- Maa Tripulmalini Mandir

== Gallery ==
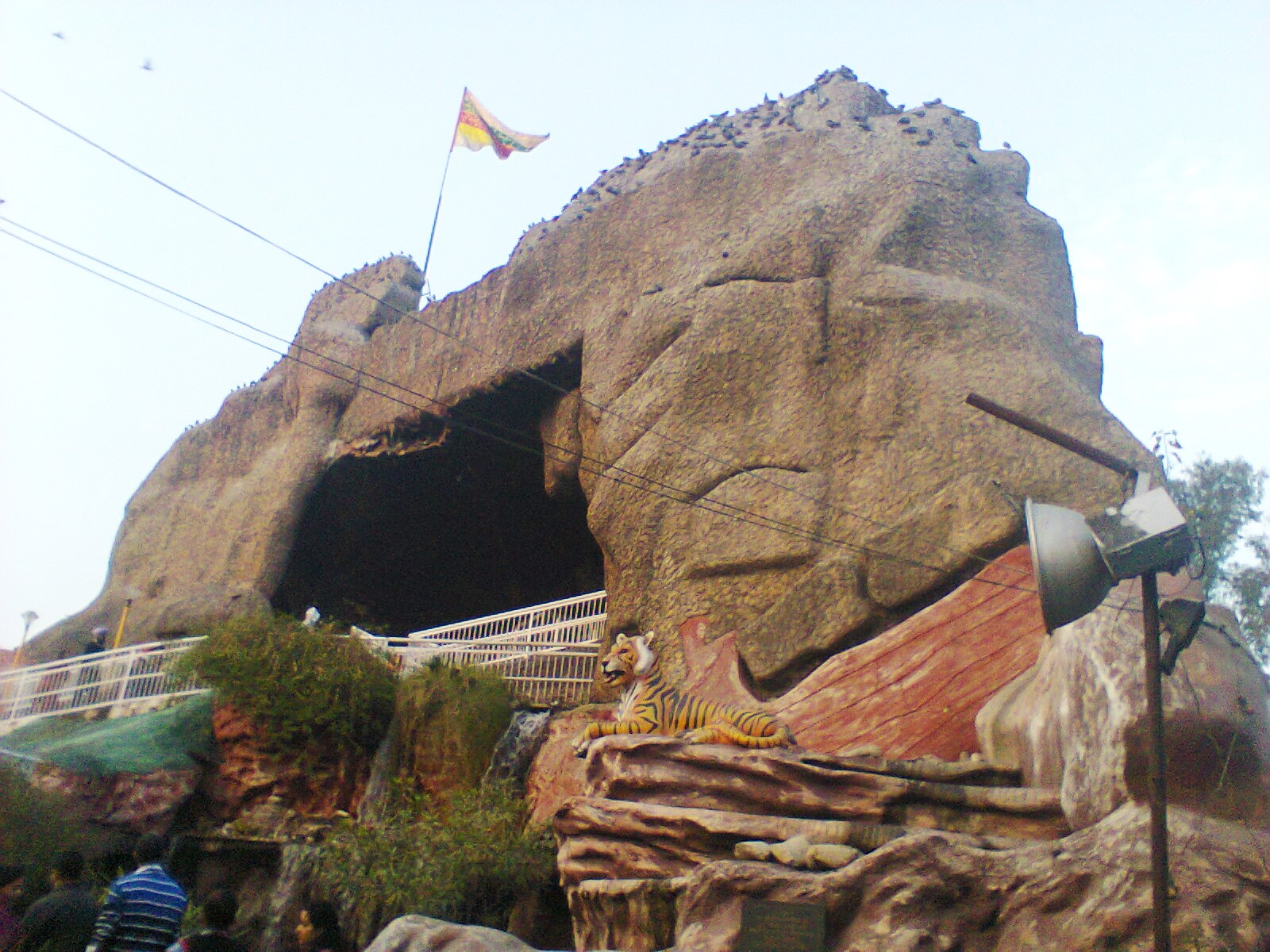
Amarnath Cave model

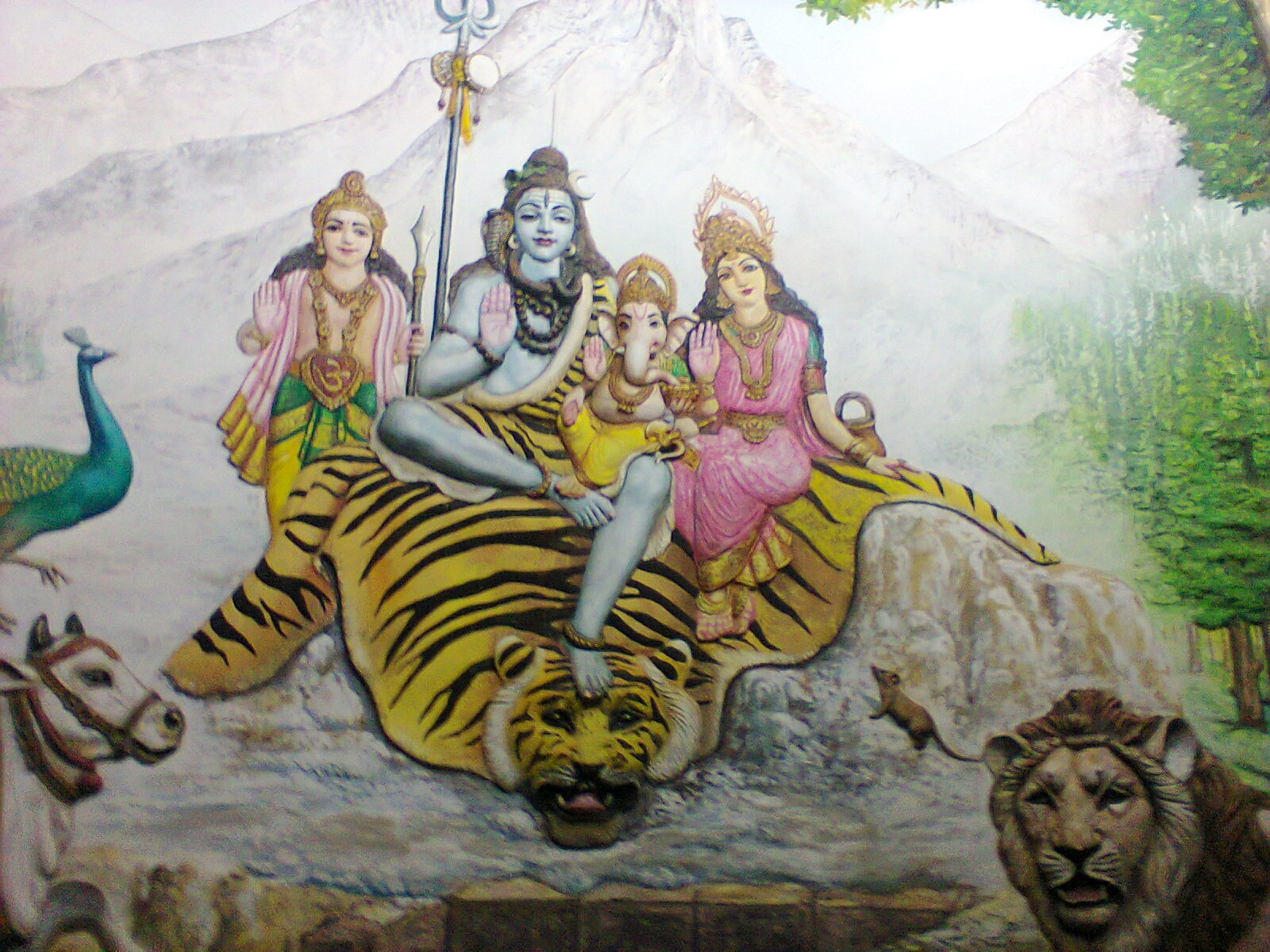
Wall painting

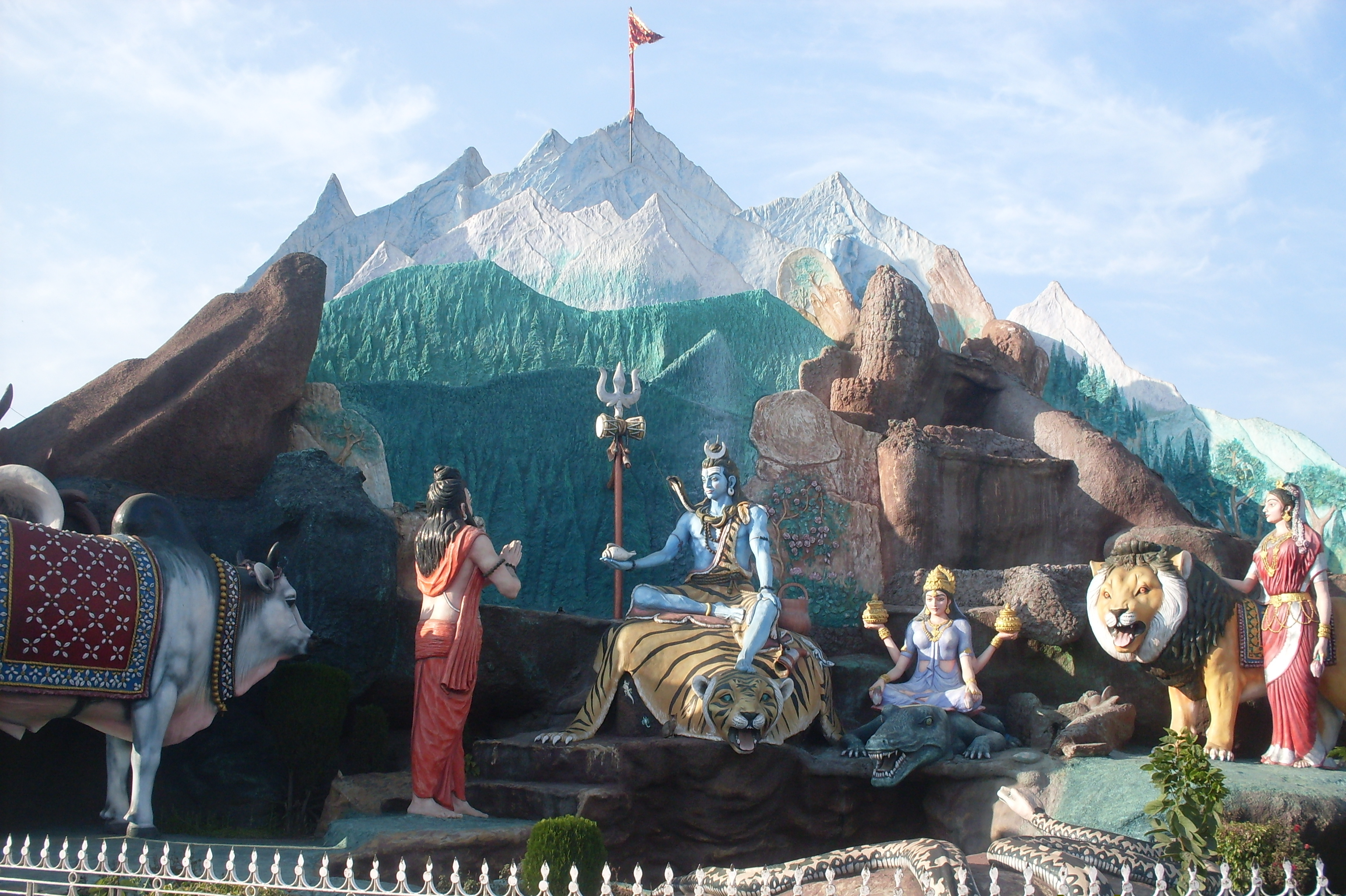
Clay model

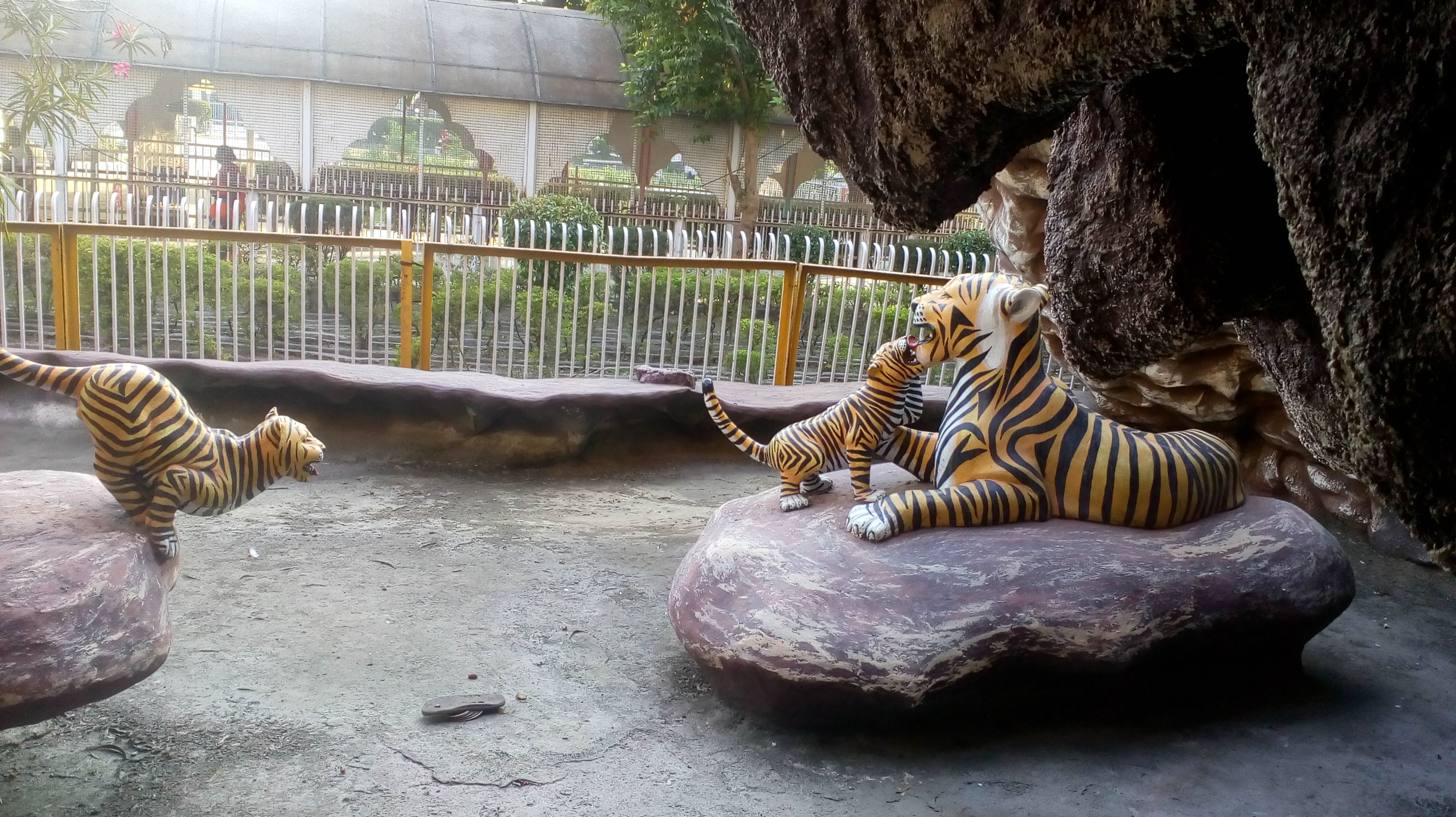
Tiger models

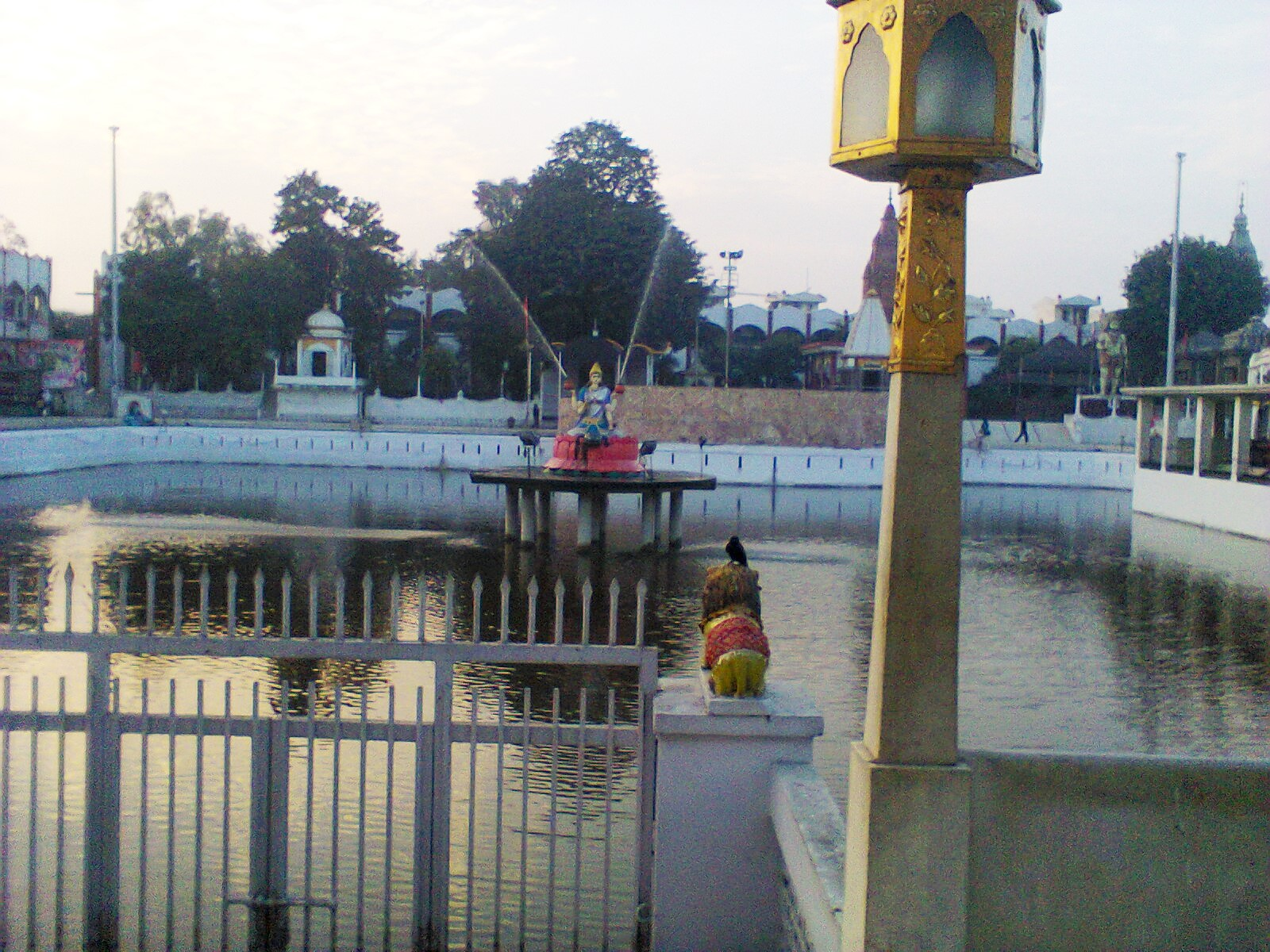
200-year-old pond

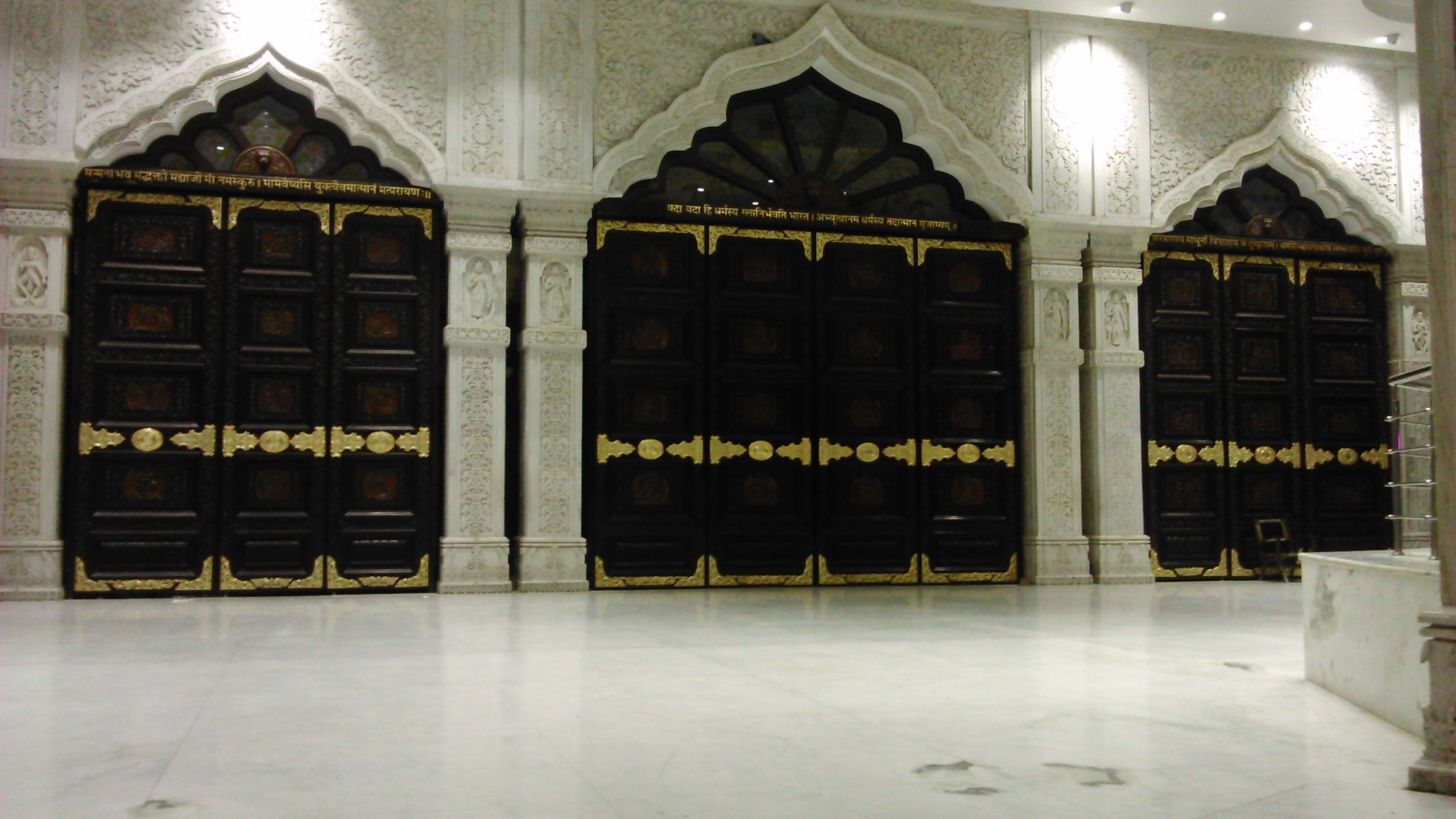
Carved, wooden doors at Devi Talab Mandir, Jalandhar

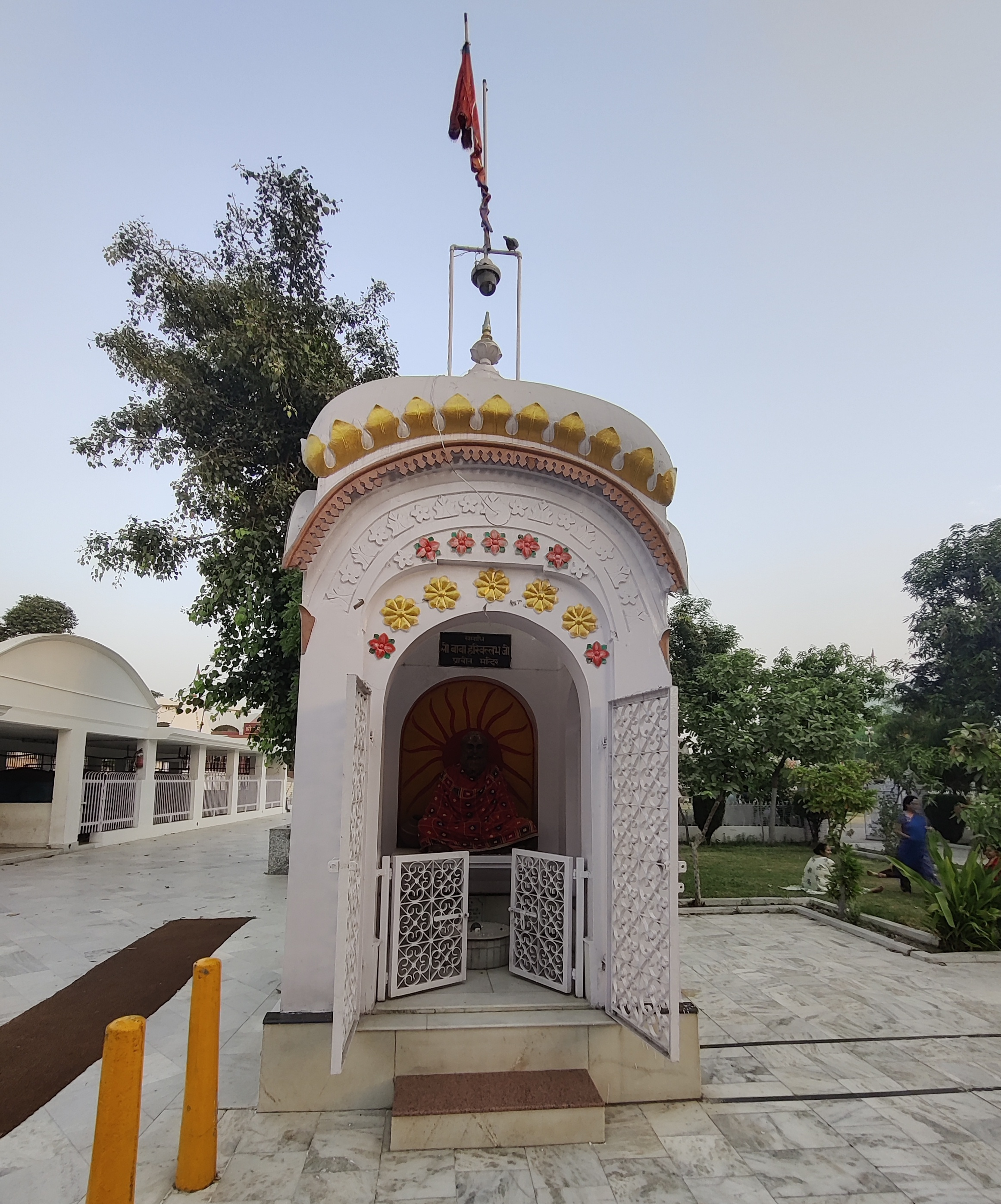
Haribhallav Mandir within the complex

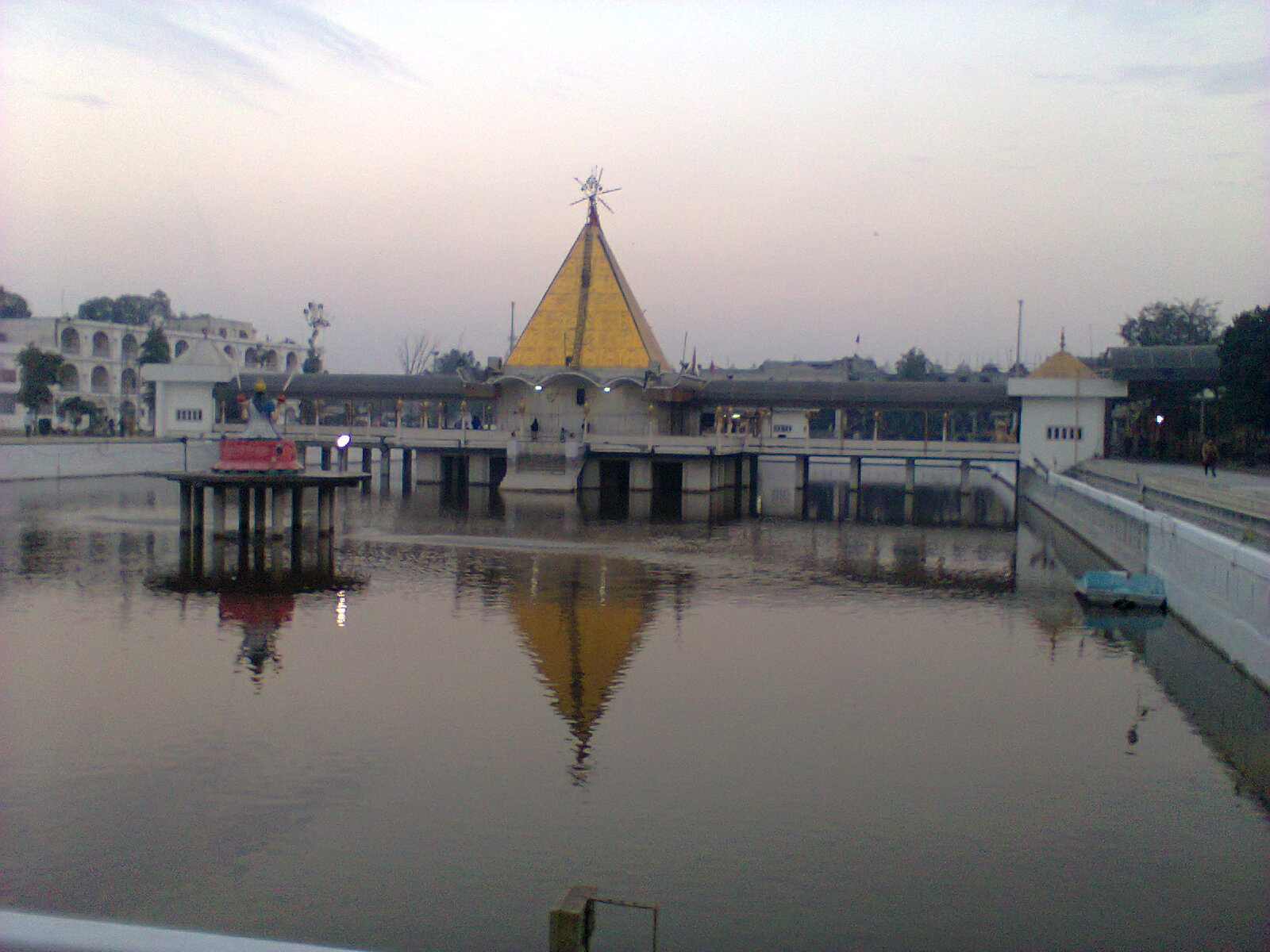
The temple complex photographed on 2 February 2013

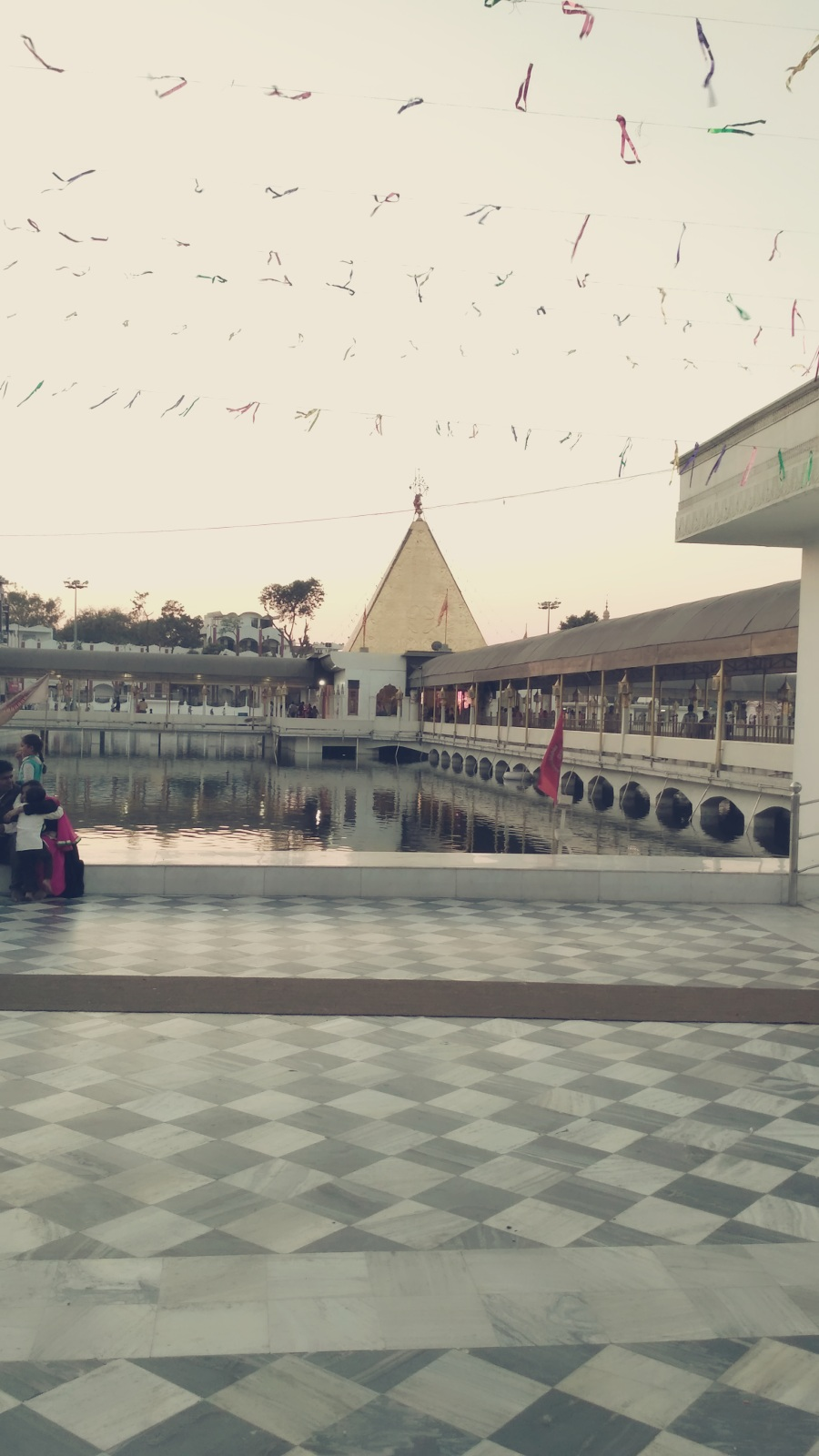
Temple complex photographed on 5 March 2017
