= Iqbal Preet Singh Sahota =

Indian police officer

Iqbal Preet Singh Sahota was the former DGP and State Police Chief of Punjab. He was the third Dalit Chief of Punjab Police since Independence.

== Professional and personal life ==
Mr. Sahota is a native of Jalandhar and born in Ravidassia family. His father was a deceased bureaucrat, Mr. NS Sahota. He is a 1988 batch IPS and has served in various capacities, from the rank of ACP to DGP, during his around 34-year-long stint in police service. Master's in political science, Sahota served as SSP Hoshiarpur, Tarn Taran, Ludhiana, Fatehgarh Sahib, Amritsar Rural, and Barnala and also remained the Commandant of the 1st IRB. He also held significant responsibilities as DIG at Patiala, Ferozepur, and the Border Range. He also served as IG at the Punjab State Human Rights Commission, Commando Training Centre, Bahadurgarh, Lokpal Punjab Border Range Amritsar, Punjab Police Headquarters, etc. He was also awarded the Police Medal for Gallantry, the Kathin Seva Medal, the police medal for meritorious services, and the police medal for distinguished service in various capacities.
