= Masih =

Masih is Arabic for 'Christ' or 'Messiah'. Christians, Muslims and members of related religions use Masih as a religious title for Jesus of Nazareth.

Also spelled Mesih or Maseeh, it is used as a proper name in many languages. The term also appears in the Christian name Abdul Masih ("Servant of Christ").

== Historical ==
- Dionysius bar Masih (died 1204), leader of the Syriac Orthodox Church
- Mesih Pasha (died 1501), Ottoman Grand Admiral and later Grand Vizier
- Mesihi of Prishtina (c. 1470–1512), Ottoman poet
- Hadim Mesih Pasha (died 1589), Ottoman Grand Vizier

== Given name ==
- Bir Masih Saunta (born 1969), Indian politician
- Masih Alinejad (born 1976), Iranian journalist and writer
- Masih Masihnia (born 1955), Iranian football player
- Masih Saighani (born 1986), Afghan football player
- Masih Ullah Barakzai (born 1990), Afghan football player
- Masih Zahedi (born 1993), Iranian football player
- Muhammad Masihullah Khan (1911/1912–1992), Indian Deobandi Islamic scholar

== Surname ==
- Akram Masih Gill, Pakistani politician
- Arif Masih, (born 1970) Pakistani politician
- Fariborz Maseeh, Iranian-American engineer
- Ijaz Masih, Pakistani politician
- Iqbal Masih (1983–1995), Pakistani boy who became a symbol of abusive child labour in the developing world
- Michael Masih (born 1985), Pakistani football player
- Naeem Masih (born 1987), Pakistani para-athlete
- Rakesh Masih (born 1987), Indian football player
- Sayed Md Masih (born 1944), Bengali politician
- Shazia Masih (1997–2010), Pakistani torture victim

== Other uses ==
- Jai Masih Ki, a greeting phrase used by Christians in India and Pakistan
- Maseeh College of Engineering and Computer Science, engineering college in Portland State University
