= Masih (name) =

Proper name of Arabic origin meaning 'Messiah' or 'Christ'

Masih (Arabic: مسيح, romanized: Masīḥ), also spelled Mesih or Maseeh, is a name of Arabic origin which means 'Messiah' or 'Christ'. The word Masīḥ is the Arabic form of the Hebrew title Māshīaḥ (מָשִׁיחַ) or the Greek title Khristós (Χριστός), meaning "anointed one". It is used as a name and title for Jesus in the Quran, and is also the common word used by Arab Christians for Christ.

Masih is also a common Christian surname in India and Pakistan (Hindi: मसीह, Urdu: مسیح). Some people in India and Pakistan have adopted the surname Masih after their conversion to Christianity.

In Mughal India (1526–1857), Christians such as the Bourbons of India were honoured with the title Masih.

== Historical ==
- Dionysius bar Masih (died 1204), leader of the Syriac Orthodox Church
- Mesih Pasha (died 1501), Ottoman Grand Admiral and later Grand Vizier
- Mesihi of Prishtina (c. 1470–1512), Ottoman poet
- Hadim Mesih Pasha (died 1589), Ottoman Grand Vizier

== Modern ==
=== Given name ===
- Bir Masih Saunta (born 1969), Indian politician
- Masih Alinejad (born 1976), Iranian journalist and writer
- Masih Masihnia, Iranian footballer
- Masih Saighani, Afghan footballer
- Masih Ullah Barakzai, Afghan footballer
- Masih Zahedi, Iranian footballer
- Muhammad Masihullah Khan (1911/1912–1992), Indian Deobandi Islamic scholar

=== Surname ===
- Vikrant Massey, (born 1987) Bollywood actor
- Akram Masih Gill, Pakistani politician
- Arif Masih, (born 1970) Pakistani politician
- Augustine George Masih, Indian judge
- Fariborz Maseeh, Iranian-American engineer
- Ijaz Masih, Pakistani politician
- Iqbal Masih (1983–1995), Pakistani boy who became a symbol of abusive child labour in the developing world
- Michael Masih (born 1985), Pakistani football player
- Naeem Masih (born 1987), Pakistani para-athlete
- Rakesh Masih (born 1987), Indian football player
- Shazia Masih (1997–2010), Pakistani torture victim

== See also ==
- Christianity in India
- Christianity in Pakistan
- Christianity in the Middle East
- Jai Masih Ki, Hindi-Urdu greeting phrase meaning 'Victory to Christ'
- List of Arabic given names
- Masih (title)
