= Punjabi Christians =

Ethnic Punjabis who follow Christianity

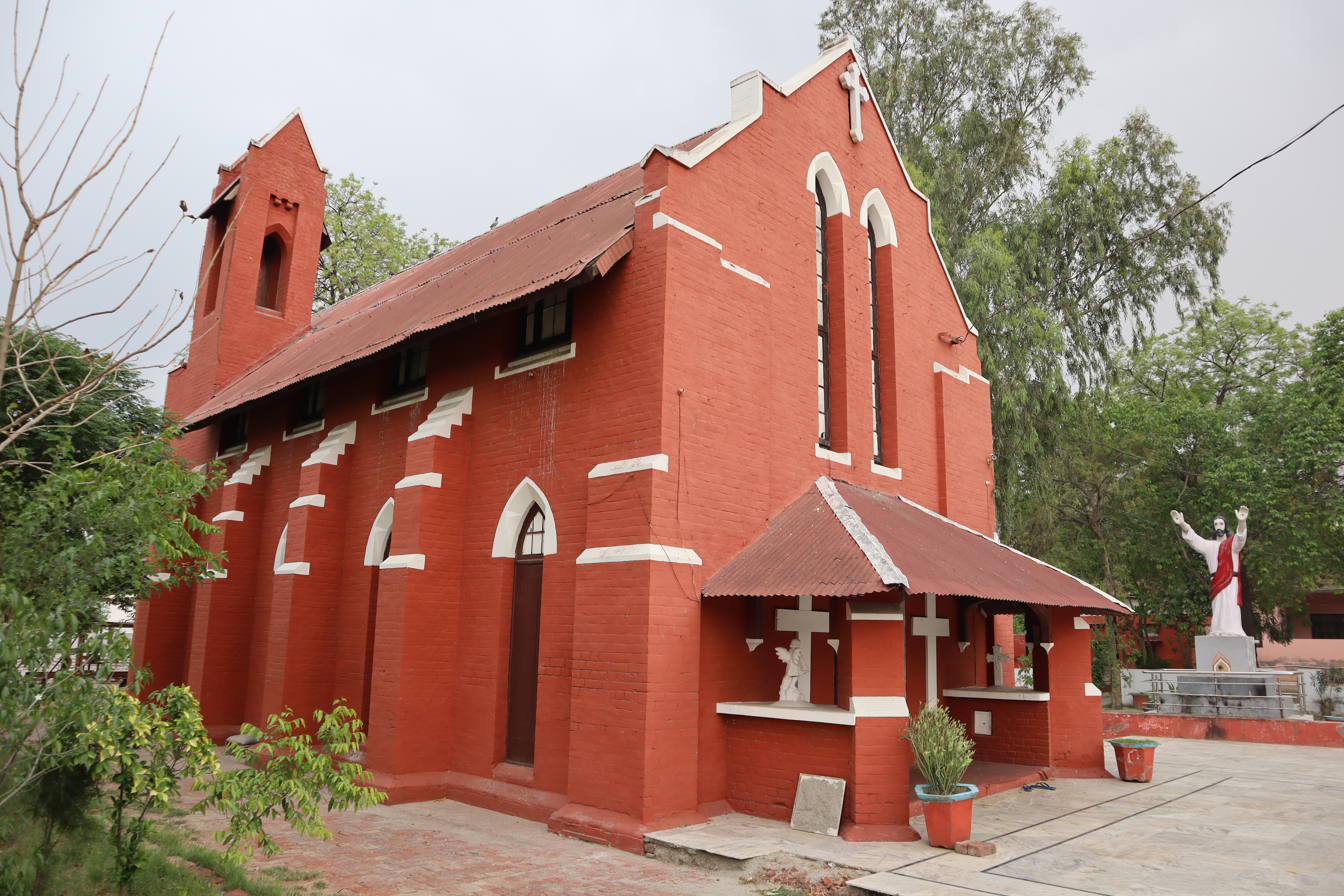
- A methodist church in Bathinda, Punjab, India

Total population
- c. 2,850,000

Regions with significant populations
- Pakistan: 2,460,000
- India: 350,000
- United Kingdom: 20,000 (est.)

Religions
- Christianity (Catholicism and Protestantism)

Languages
- Punjabi, Urdu, English, Hindi

Punjabi Christians are ethnic Punjabis who adhere to Christianity. Punjabi Christians reside in the Punjab region, which includes the countries of Pakistan and India; they are almost equally divided between Catholicism and Protestantism. With an estimated three million living in the Pakistani province of Punjab, they account for 75 percent of the country's total Christian population. They are the second-largest religious community in the province behind Muslims, comprising approximately 1.5 to 2.8 percent of its population. In India, a significant Punjabi Christian community is also found in the Indian state of Punjab. With a population of roughly 350,000, they comprise 1.26 percent of the state's population according to official Indian government figures.

Punjabi Christians are traditionally divided into various castes, and are largely descendants of Hindus who converted to Christianity during the British Raj in colonial India. About 90 to 95% of Punjabi Christians are Dalits from the Chuhra caste who converted from Hinduism.

== History ==
=== Pre-colonial ===
Armenians began visiting the Indian subcontinent, especially the Punjab region, for trading purposes since the early part of the 2nd millennium. There are sparse records that document Armenians settling in the region prior to the reign of Mughal emperor Akbar. In the mid-16th century, Akbar invited the Armenian merchant Hakobjan, who was based out of Lahore to settle in Agra, and asked him to convince other Armenians based in Punjab to also move to the imperial city. By the 1570s, there was a regular presence of Armenian merchants in the city of Lahore, whom specialized in high-value and low-quantity goods with Persia and Central Asia. In the early 16th century, there was an Armenian colony established in Lahore. There was an Armenian quarter of the city, enclosed by a wall of the city fort. There were interactions between the Armenians and Jesuits, as recorded in the letters left by the Jesuits. The Armenian archbishop died on his way to Lahore via a Persian land-route in 1599, with his belongings being looted. Some of the looted books of the deceased Armenian archbishop came into the possession of the Jesuit Emmanuel Pinheiro, which upset the Armenians. In a letter dating to 6 September 1604, Jerome Xavier records that the Armenians in Lahore could practice their Christian faith freely due to a royal decree (firman) issued by Akbar. Emmanuel Pinheiro, writing on 12 August 1609, states that the Mughal governor threatened to exterminate the Christian religion from the city of Lahore, spooking the Armenians, causing some of them to flee the city, as the Armenians did not have the desire to become religious martyrs. The Jesuits attempted to convince the Armenians of Lahore to convert to Catholicism. Mirza Iskandar, the father of Mirza Zulqarnain, left behind a will bequeathing a sum of 2,000 rupees to the church and Christians of Lahore. Additionally, a sum of 600 rupees was for a Christian cemetery of Lahore.

The Armenians were hesitant to get on the bad side of the Jesuits, as the Jesuits were close with the Mughal viceroy and held political sway as a result. François Valentyn recorded that on 10 December 1711 when a mission of the Dutch East India Company led by John Jeshua Kettler reached Lahore, they were greeted by an Armenian bishop and some Jesuits. The existence of an Armenian bishop in Lahore in 1711 points to the existence of an established church or chapel in the city to cater to a large congregation.

In 1735, the Jesuit Emmanuel de Figueiredo wrote that the elite Mughal military units stationed in Lahore consisted of many Christian members in its officer-classes.

After the second Durrani Afghan invasion of Punjab, Ahmad Shah Durrani is said to have taken all of the Christian gunners who were in the service of Mir Mannu, the viceroy of Lahore province, back to Kabul. In 1757, during the third Durrani invasion of Punjab, the Armenian quarter of the city of Lahore still existed, as Armenian and Georgian soldiers who were employed in the Durrani military protected it from the Afghans, sparing it and its inhabitants from being pillaged and destroyed like much of the surrounding city. An Armenian is said to have cast the famous Zamzama gun in Lahore in 1761.

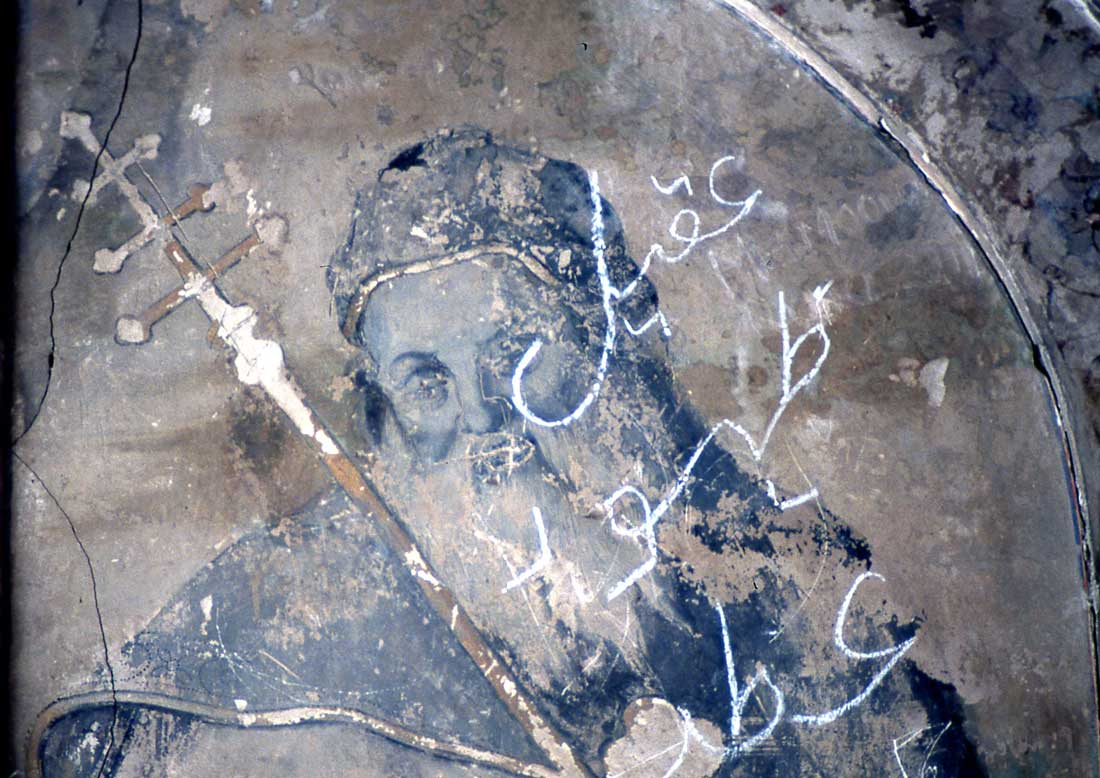
Detail of a defaced Christian mural of Gregory the Great, from the Sedari on the north wall of Lahore Fort, Punjab, circa 17th century

Jesuits arrived in the region in the 16th century during the Mughal period but their nascent mission was temporarily shut-down during the reign of emperor Shah Jahan. The Jesuit mission in the Indian subcontinent began in 1545, which was marked by the arrival of Francis Xavier in Goa. In 1578, Akbar requested for two Jesuits to explain the Christian religion to him at his court in Fatehpur Sikri. Antoni de Montserrat, whom had arrived in the Indian subcontinent several years earlier in 1574, and Rodolfo Acquaviva, were selected for the task. The pair left Goa in November 1579 whilst being accompanied by a Persian convert named Henriquez, who would act as their translator at the Mughal court, and the group were also chaperoned by a member of Akbar's court. After three months of travel, the two Jesuits and their group arrived at Akbar's court, where they were warmly received and would spend much time in-dialogue with court officials and members of other religions. In 1581, Montserrat accompanied Akbar on a military campaign to the northwestern regions, including Punjab, reaching as far as Kabul, with Montserrat producing an early map of the northwestern region of the subcontinent. In 1595, Bento de Góis travelled to Lahore and Agra as a companion of Jerome Xavier, paying a visit to Akbar's court.

In 1606, Jerome Xavier was in Lahore during the execution of the fifth Sikh guru, Guru Arjan, with Xavier recording an eyewitness testimony of the incident. Jerome Xavier, in appreciation of the courage of Guru Arjan, wrote back to Lisbon, that Guru Arjan suffered and was tormented.

According to Ilay Cooper, Christian murals were painted in a Sedari pavilion located on the North Wall of Lahore Fort during the reign of Jahangir in circa 1618.

A copy of Sacred Scripture in Roman Urdu, published by the Bible Society of India

=== Colonial ===
From the mid-19th to early 20th centuries, a number of Christian texts were translated and made widely available in the Punjabi language, such as the New Testament, the Gospels, and texts relating to Jesus. In 1811, the Serampore Mission Press translated the New Testament into Gurmukhi Punjabi. The later Ludhiana Mission Press was more active and successful in the region. Ninety-five percent of Punjabi Christians are converts to Christianity from Hinduism, accepting their new faith during the British Raj in colonial India. By 1870, there were only a few thousand Christians in the Punjab Province of colonial India; the 1880s saw the growth of the Presbyterian Church from 660 to 10,615 baptized Christians. Continued evangelism efforts by Christian missionaries, especially those from the Church of Scotland and Church Missionary Society in India led to nearly half a million Punjabi Christians by the 1930s. In the Gujranwala, Sialkot and Sheikhupura districts of the Punjab Province in colonial India, Christians came to constitute 7% of the total population.

The All India Conference of Indian Christians (AICIC) held its first meeting on 28 December 1914 and was led by Raja Sir Harnam Singh of Kapurthala, who was the president of the National Missionary Society (NMS); the first AICIC General Secretary was B. L. Rallia Ram of Lahore. The meeting of the AICIC in Lahore in December 1922, which had a large attendance of Punjabis, resolved that the clergymen of the Church in India should be drawn from the ranks of Indians, rather than foreigners. The AICIC also stated that Indian Christians would not tolerate any discrimination based on race or skin colour. S. K. Datta of Lahore, who served as the principal of Forman Christian College in then colonial India, became the president of the AICIC, representing the Indian Christian community at the Second Round Table Conference, where he agreed with Mahatma Gandhi's views on minorities and Depressed Classes.

In June 1947, the total population of Punjabi Christians in the Punjab Province of colonial India was recorded at 511,299. Of these, 450,344 were based in West Punjab and 60,955 were in East Punjab. After the partition of British India, most Punjabi Christians remained in place, with the majority finding themselves within the borders of Pakistan and the rest in independent India. Those Christians who were serving in official government positions and the civil service were given the choice of opting for either of the countries. The many British-era churches and cathedrals dotting the various cities of Punjab were overtaken by Punjabi Christians, and they also continued the legacy of maintaining Christian educational institutions and healthcare facilities which had remained nationally renowned.

== Culture ==
According to Selva J. Raj, the Punjabi Christian identity is an amalgamation of the Christian faith along with an ethnic affinity for the culture of Punjab, which includes the Punjabi language, Punjabi cuisine, the various customs and traditions of Punjab, and the way of life of the Punjabi people in general.

As a result of living close to Punjabis of other faiths for generations, there have been notable cross-cultural influences; the Urdu language for instance features heavily in the theology and literature of Punjabi Christians. The earliest Christian scriptures which were published by British missionaries in the Punjab included those written in Roman Urdu.

== Geographical distribution ==
=== Pakistan ===
As of 1981, Lahore was the city with the largest Christian population in Pakistan, numbering over 200,000. The cities of Faisalabad, Sialkot and Sheikhupura are home to sizable communities. In rural Punjab, many Christians belong to the Dalit Christian community, specifically the Chuhra community, whose ancestors had converted to Christianity from Hinduism during the colonial era to escape a discriminatory caste system in which they were regarded untouchables. According to Dawn, compared to the more affluent Pakistani Christian communities of Anglo-Indians and Goan Catholics, who at the time of independence lived in the major cities, were proficient in English, and maintained upper-class British cultural mannerisms, the Chuhras reflected the lower socioeconomic end of Pakistan; they were predominately labourers and peasants who were unskilled, did not own land, were neither highly educated or wealthy, and lived in the villages of central Punjab. Despite having embraced Christianity, they still faced discrimination at some level due to their caste, skin colour, and economic status. Peter C. Phan states that these Chuhras form the vast majority of Pakistani Christians. There continue to be several Christian-majority villages and settlements throughout Pakistani Punjab, such as Clarkabad and Martinpur. The Christians belonging to the lower-income strata of Pakistani society face a number of social and economic issues, such as bonded labour. Because of their impoverishment, many of them are forced to work in menial labour jobs, such as cleaners and sweepers; in Punjab alone, an estimated 80 percent of all sanitation workers belong to the Christian community. As a result of urbanisation, employment-driven migration into larger cities and greater educational opportunities, an increasing number of Punjabi Christians have been able to gain a college education and acquire socially respectable positions in recent times.

In the Islamabad Capital Territory, the Christian community dwells in large numbers in Francis Colony, a legally-recognised residential area situated in sector F-7. Others live in slums (katchi abadis) located on government-owned land, to where they have shifted from Narowal, Shakargarh, Sheikhupura, Kasur, Faisalabad, Sahiwal and Sialkot in Punjab. In Azad Kashmir, there are close to 5,000 Punjabi Christians who live in the Bhimber, Mirpur, Muzaffarabad, Kotli, Poonch and Bagh districts. Their roots lie mostly in Rawalpindi and Sialkot. Most of the 50,000 or so Christians in Khyber Pakhtunkhwa speak Punjabi, and had ancestors who settled in this area, but have gradually become Pashtunized over time due to cultural assimilation. The largest Christian population is in Peshawar, and there are a few hundred Christians in Swat. The districts forming the erstwhile tribal areas along the Afghan frontier have been home to thousands of Christians since the early 20th century; according to the 1998 census, there were 1,500 Christians in South Waziristan, 2,000 in North Waziristan, 500 in Bajaur, 700 in Mohmand and 1,500 in Khyber District, all of whose ancestors migrated from Punjab. They primarily work in nursing, teaching, cleaning or in clerical jobs.

In Sindh, there have been Punjabi Christians settled for several decades; they include farmers, landowners, agricultural workers and other labourers engaged in blue collar work in the rural countryside, with Catholic villages existing in Hyderabad, Nawabshah, Sanghar and Mirpur Khas. The metropolis of Karachi is home to the largest population, with over 20,000 Punjabi Christians living in the neighbourhood of Essa Nagri alone. In Balochistan, the majority of the province's 80,000 to 100,000 Christians are Punjabis.

In Gilgit-Baltistan, Christians from Punjab are present across all of the ten districts, and are involved in janitorial work in both the public and private sectors.

=== India ===
In India, the majority of Punjabi Christians belong to the Dalit community of Chuhras and belong to the lower-income working class. At just over one percent of Punjab's population, their main population centres include the Gurdaspur, Amritsar, Firozpur, Jalandhar and Ludhiana districts. There have historically been Punjabi Christian communities in Jammu, Delhi, and in Chandigarh, where the Christians are also known as Isai and belong to various sects. The Punjabi Christians in Chandigarh often bear the surname Masih. Likewise in Haryana, some of the Christians settled there are Punjabis and are also commonly referred to as the Isai. Both Chandigarh and Haryana were a part of Punjab up until 1966, when they were carved out as a separate union territory and state respectively.

== Diaspora ==
As a result of immigration, a large Christian Punjabi diaspora exists today. There are significant Punjabi Christian communities in Canada (particularly Toronto), the United States (particularly Philadelphia), the Middle East, the United Kingdom, as well as other parts of Europe and Australia. In the UK, Christian Punjabis are concentrated in the cities of London, Bedford, Birmingham, Coventry, Oxford and Wolverhampton among others. One of the most prominent early Punjabi Christians in the UK was Duleep Singh, who first landed in the country in 1854, he was the Sikh Prince kidnapped by British at young age and converted without his knowing. He left Christianity at a later age and converted back to his Sikh beliefs.

Some who have sought to resettle in the West arrived in Thailand, Sri Lanka and Malaysia as their first destinations, where they filed applications with the UNHCR. Many individuals fled due to unfavorable conditions for Christians in Pakistan, resulting in concerns that such a haphazard diaspora led to irregular immigration and sex trafficking in areas such as China. Among other motives for emigration, Christians have left Pakistan for economic reasons, greater opportunities to attain higher education or theological training, desire to join relatives already settled abroad, and to escape religious discrimination/persecution.

== List of people ==
- Akram Masih Gill, Pakistani politician
- Amrit Kaur, first Health Minister of India
- Ashir Azeem, Pakistani film and television director, actor, writer and former civil services officer
- Bir Masih Saunta, Indian politician and G. S. of Punjab Pradesh Congress Committee (Minority Dept.)
- B. K. Dass, Pakistani fighter pilot, Air Commodore, and head of civil aviation
- Brother Bakht Singh, Indian evangelist
- Bobby Jindal, American politician
- Bohemia (David Roger), first Punjabi rapper
- Ankur Narula, Indianevangelist and senior pastor and overseer in the Church of Signs and Wonders
- Cecil Chaudhry, Pakistani academic, human rights activist, and veteran fighter pilot
- Edward Nirmal Mangat Rai, Chief Secretary of East Punjab from 1957 to 1962 and the Chief Secretary of Jammu and Kashmir from 1964 to 1966; architect of Chandigarh
- Gurmit Singh (half Punjabi), Indian-Singaporean actor-singer
- Harnam Singh, a president of the All India Conference of Indian Christians
- Iqbal Masih, Pakistani boy who became a symbol of abusive child labour
- Jasvinder Sanghera, British activist
- Jia Ali, Pakistani actress and model
- John Joseph (bishop), former Catholic Bishop of Faisalabad
- Julian Peter, former Major General in Pakistan Army
- Kalpana Kartik, Bollywood actress and wife of Dev Anand
- Kamran Michael, Pakistani politician who served as minister for statistics
- Michael Masih, Pakistani footballer
- Naeem Masih, Pakistani para athlete
- Nazir Latif, former Pakistani air force officer
- Nikki Haley (born as Nimrata Randhawa), Indian American diplomat who served as the governor of South Carolina and the United States ambassador to the United Nations
- Nirmal Roy, Pakistani singer
- Noel Israel Khokhar, former Major General and current Pakistani ambassador to Ukraine
- Peter Christy, former Pakistani air force officer
- Raja Maharaj Singh, first Indian Governor of Bombay Presidency
- Rakesh Masih, Indian footballer
- Sadhu Sundar Singh, Indian Christian missionary
- Samuel Azariah, Pakistani bishop
- Samuel Martin Burke, Pakistani diplomat, author and professor
- Sardar Anjum , Indian poet
- Satya Prakash Singha (half Punjabi), speaker of Punjab Assembly in colonial India; Pakistani politician
- Shazia Hidayat, Pakistani track and field athlete
- Shae Gill, Pakistani singer, famous for the Coke Studio song "Pasoori"
- Shahbaz Bhatti, first federal Minister for Minorities Affairs and Member of the National Assembly of Pakistan
- Sidra Sadaf, Pakistani cyclist
- Sunita Marshall, Pakistani model and TV actress

== See also ==
- Punjabi Muslims
- Punjabi Hindus
- Punjabi Sikhs
- Christianity in Pakistan
- Christianity in India
- Jai Masih Ki
