= Christianity in Punjab, India =

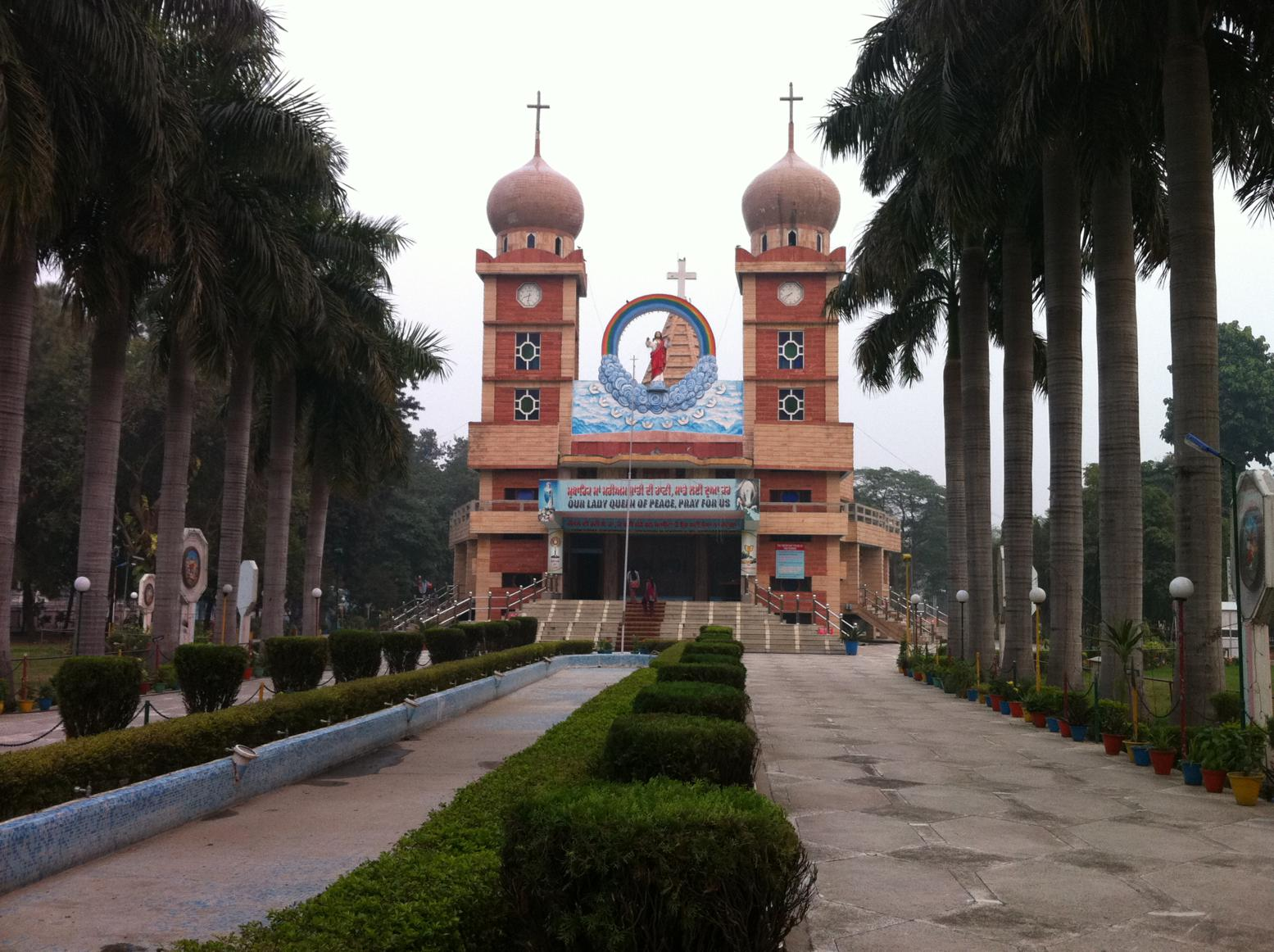
St. Mary's Cathedral in Jalandhar, India

Christians form 1.26% of the total population numbering around 350,000 in Punjab, India as per as the 2011 census. The Diocese of Amritsar of the Church of North India has its seat in Punjab as does the Roman Catholic diocese of Jalandhar.

There are numerous denominations, including the United Churches of North India (UCNI), Protestant Church, Methodist Church, Presbyterian Church, Roman Catholic Church, Eternal Light Ministries, Kashmir Evangelical Fellowship, the Pentecostal Mission, Pentecostal and Independent Churches.

In the Punjabi language, Jesus Christ is known as Yeshu Masih.

== History ==
=== Pre-colonial ===
It is claimed that Saint Thomas came to Taxila in the year 46 as an architect on the invitation of the Indo-Parthian ruler Gondophares IV.

Armenians have been visiting the Indian subcontinent, especially the Punjab region, for trading purposes since the early part of the 2nd millennium. There are sparse records existing that document Armenians settling in the region prior to the reign of Akbar. In the mid-16th century, Akbar invited the Armenian merchant Hakobjan, who was based out of Lahore to settle in Agra, and asked him to convince other Armenians based in Punjab to also move to the imperial city. By the 1570s, there was a regular presence of Armenian merchants in the city of Lahore, whom specialized in high-value and low-quantity goods with Persia and Central Asia. In the early 16th century, there was an Armenian colony established in Lahore. There was an Armenian quarter of the city, enclosed by a wall of the city fort. There were interactions between the Armenians and Jesuits, as recorded in the letters left by the Jesuits. The Armenian archbishop died on his way to Lahore via a Persian land-route in 1599, with his belongings being looted. Some of the looted books of the deceased Armenian archbishop came into the possession of the Jesuit Emmanuel Pinheiro, which upset the Armenians. In a letter dating to 6 September 1604, Jerome Xavier records that the Armenians in Lahore could practice their Christian faith freely due to a royal decree (firman) issued by Akbar. Emmanuel Pinheiro, writing on 12 August 1609, states that the Mughal governor threatened to exterminate the Christian religion from the city of Lahore, spooking the Armenians, causing some of them to flee the city, as the Armenians did not have the desire to become religious martyrs. The Jesuits attempted to convince the Armenians of Lahore to convert to Catholicism. Mirza Iskandar, the father of Mirza Zulqarnain, left behind a will bequeathing a sum of 2,000 rupees to the church and Christians of Lahore. Additionally, a sum of 600 rupees was for a Christian cemetery of Lahore.

The Armenians were hesitant to get on the bad side of the Jesuits, as the Jesuits were close with the Mughal viceroy and held political sway as a result. François Valentyn recorded that on 10 December 1711 when a mission of the Dutch East India Company led by John Jeshua Kettler reached Lahore, they were greeted by an Armenian bishop and some Jesuits. The existence of an Armenian bishop in Lahore in 1711 points to the existence of an established church or chapel in the city to cater to a large congregation.

In 1735, the Jesuit Emmanuel de Figueiredo wrote that the elite Mughal military units stationed in Lahore consisted of many Christian members in its officer-classes.

After the second Durrani Afghan invasion of Punjab, Ahmad Shah Durrani is said to have taken all of the Christian gunners who were in the service of Mir Mannu, the viceroy of Lahore province, back to Kabul. In 1757, during the third Durrani invasion of Punjab, the Armenian quarter of the city of Lahore still existed, as Armenian and Georgian soldiers who were employed in the Durrani military protected it from the Afghans, sparing it and its inhabitants from being pillaged and destroyed like much of the surrounding city. An Armenian is said to have cast the famous Zamzama gun in Lahore in 1761.

Jesuits arrived in the region in the 16th century during the Mughal period but their nascent mission was temporarily shut-down during the reign of emperor Shah Jahan. The Jesuit mission in the Indian subcontinent began in 1545, which was marked by the arrival of Francis Xavier in Goa. In 1578, Akbar requested for two Jesuits to explain the Christian religion to him at his court in Fatehpur Sikri. Antoni de Montserrat, whom had arrived in the Indian subcontinent several years earlier in 1574, and Rodolfo Acquaviva, were selected for the task. The pair left Goa in November 1579 whilst being accompanied by a Persian convert named Henriquez, who would act as their translator at the Mughal court, and the group were also chaperoned by a member of Akbar's court. After three months of travel, the two Jesuits and their group arrived at Akbar's court, where they were warmly received and would spend much time in-dialogue with court officials and members of other religions. In 1581, Montserrat accompanied Akbar on a military campaign to the northwestern regions, including Punjab, reaching as far as Kabul, with Montserrat producing an early map of the northwestern region of the subcontinent. In 1595, Bento de Góis travelled to Lahore and Agra as a companion of Jerome Xavier, paying a visit to Akbar's court.

In 1606, Jerome Xavier was in Lahore during the execution of the fifth Sikh guru, Guru Arjan, with Xavier recording an eyewitness testimony of the incident. Jerome Xavier, in appreciation of the courage of Guru Arjan, wrote back to Lisbon, that Guru Arjan suffered and was tormented.

According to Ilay Cooper, Christian murals were painted in a Sedari pavilion located on the North Wall of Lahore Fort during the reign of Jahangir in circa 1618.

=== Colonial ===
Due to the unique context of the British administration in the Punjab, the administration of the colonial empire was linked to the establishment of Christian missionaries in the province. In 1811, the Serampore Mission Press translated the New Testament into Gurmukhi Punjabi. The later Ludhiana Mission Press was more active and successful in the region. A Christian mission had already been established in Ludhiana in 1834, the first major Christian mission-station beyond Delhi in northwest India, with a press being established the next year in 1835 to disseminate Christian literature in the vernacular languages. The Ludhiana Mission was established in November 1834 by John Lowrie of the American Presbyterian Mission Society. In December 1835, the reverends John Newton and James Wilson established a printing press for the mission. Maharaja Ranjit Singh, the Sikh ruler of the independent Sikh kingdom to the northwest, invited John Lowrie to establish a school in his empire for the offspring of nobles but the plans fell-through because the Maharaja opposed the missionary practice of teaching the Gospel in study of literature and science.

Beyond the Sutlej, the American Presbyterian missionaries Rev. John Newton and Rev. C. W. Forman arrived in Lahore after its annexation in November 1849, with them founding a Christian mission and school there by December 1849. These Christian organizations were being supported by donations from the Britishers within Punjab. Thus, the Punjabi commonfolk began linking the British administration with Christianity. After the 1857 Indian rebellion, Christian missionary activity in the Punjab increased further. In the 1850s, Christian missions were present in the Punjab Hills, Multan, and Attock, with their presence being found in all of the province by the 1880s, being found in places such as Delhi, Ambala, Lahore, Peshawar, the southern Afghan border, Dera Ismail Khan, Tank, Dera Ghazi Khan, Multan, the Punjab Hills, and Kashmir. The zenana missions by the Christian missionaries were controversial, with missionaries attempting to reach native women observing purdah in their own homes by sending women missionaries to such houses while the men of the home were away in the fields. In 1868, the colonial administration leased valuable, irrigated land in the Chunian tehsil of Lahore district for the purpose of building a Christian colony by the Church Missionary Society of Lahore. The Christian missionaries found the most success in the central Majha region of Punjab (such as in the Lahore, Amritsar, and Sialkot districts) and in Delhi but they were less successful in the princely-states, the west-central districts of Montgomery, Jhang, Shahpur, and the border districts of Kohat and Dera Ismail Khan. The missionary initially found converts among the Punjabi upper-class but later on most of the locals who converted were from the downtrodden sections of society, such as Chuhras, who converted on-mass, especially in Sialkot district. The Christian converts numbered 3,912 in 1881, 19,750 by 1891, 37,980 in 1901, and 163,994 by 1911, with the increasing Christian numbers creating anxiety amongst the Hindu, Muslim, and Sikhs, especially since native conversion to Christianity was highly publicized, with Christianity being viewed as a theat.

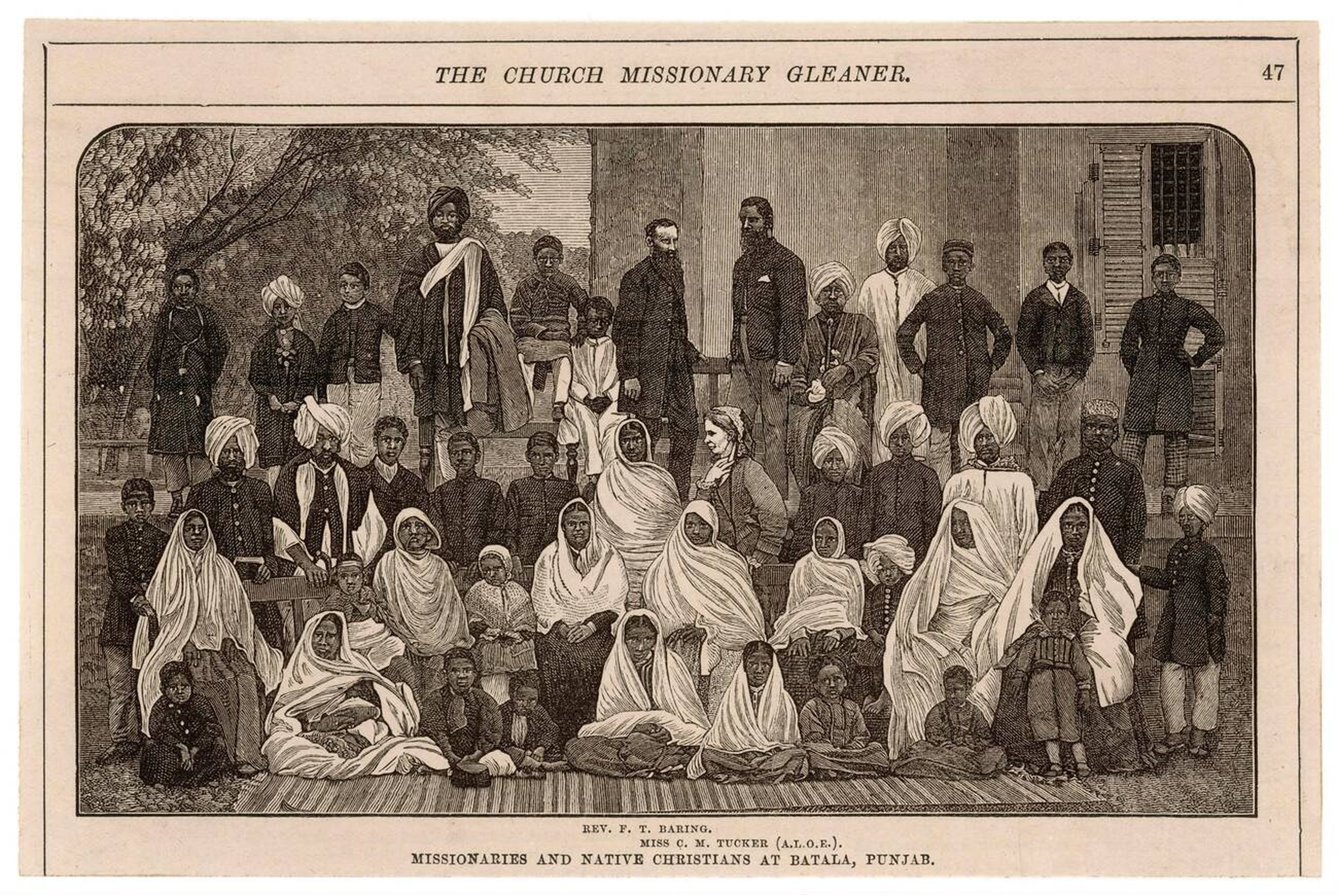
Missionaries F. T. Baring and C. M. Tucker with native Christians at Batala, Punjab, 1880

In the early 20th century, a Christian missionary named Ray Harrison Carter drafted a "Moga plan" for the betterment of destitute Christian converts in the Moga region by establishing village schools and a training school focusing on agricultural education. One of these educational institutions established by the Christian missionaries was the 'Moga Training School for Village Teachers', which was established in 1912 by the American Presbyterian Mission and conceived by Ray Harrison Carter. The institution focused on spreading Christianity throughout the villages of Moga. Some of the missionaries who served at the institution were women, such as Arthur E. Harper and Irene Mason Harper.

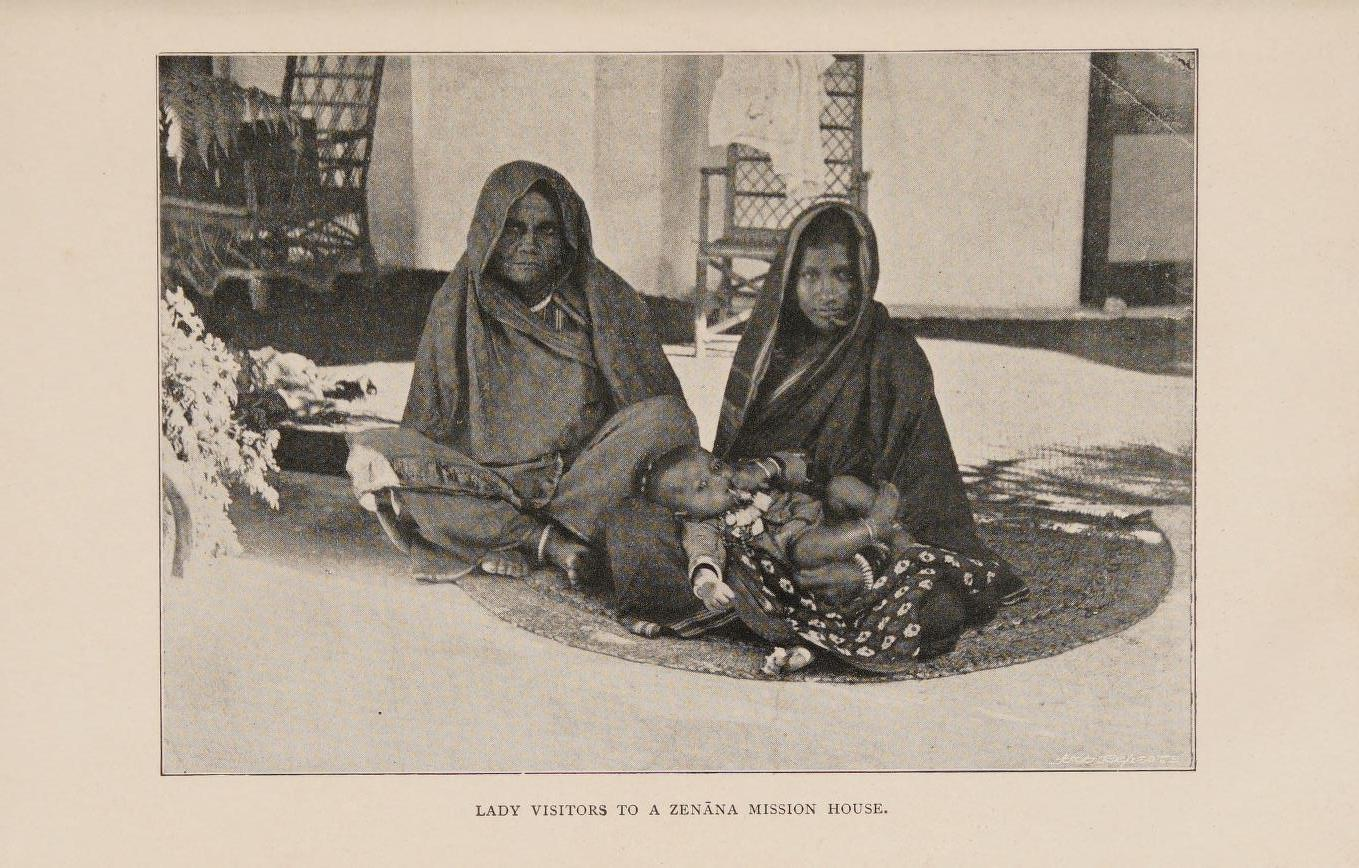
"Lady Visitors to a Zenana Mission House", published in 'Panjabi Sketches - By Two Friends' (1899) by William Muir. The zenana missions aimed at converting women and girls to Christianity.

The meeting of the All India Conference of Indian Christians in Lahore in December 1922, which had a large attendance of Punjabis, resolved that the clergymen of the Church in India should be drawn from the ranks of Indians, rather than foreigners. The AICIC also stated that Indian Christians would not tolerate any discrimination based on race or skin colour. The Christians of colonial India were active in the Indian National Congress and wider Indian independence movement, being collectively represented in the All India Conference of Indian Christians, which advocated for swaraj and opposed the partition of India.

S. K. Datta of Lahore, who served as the principal of Forman Christian College, became the president of the All India Conference of Indian Christians, representing the Indian Christian community at the Second Round Table Conference, where he agreed with Mahatma Gandhi's views on minorities and Depressed Classes.

On 30 October 1945, the All India Conference of Indian Christians formed a joint committee with the Catholic Union of India that passed a resolution in which, "in the future constitution of India, the profession, practice and propagation of religion should be guaranteed and that a change of religion should not involve any civil or political disability." This joint committee enabled the Christians in colonial India to stand united, and in front of the British Parliamentary Delegation "the committee members unanimously supported the move for independence and expressed complete confidence in the future of the community in India." The office for this joint committee was opened in Delhi, in which the Vice-Chancellor of Andhra University M. Rahnasamy served as president and B.L. Rallia Ram of Lahore served as General Secretary. Six members of the joint committee were elected to the Minorities Committee of the Constituent Assembly. In its meeting on 16 April 1947 and 17 April 1947, the joint committee of the All India Conference of Indian Christians and Catholic Union of India prepared a 13-point memorandum that was sent to the Constituent Assembly of India, which asked for religious freedom for both organisations and individuals; this came to be reflected in the Constitution of India.

=== Post-independence ===
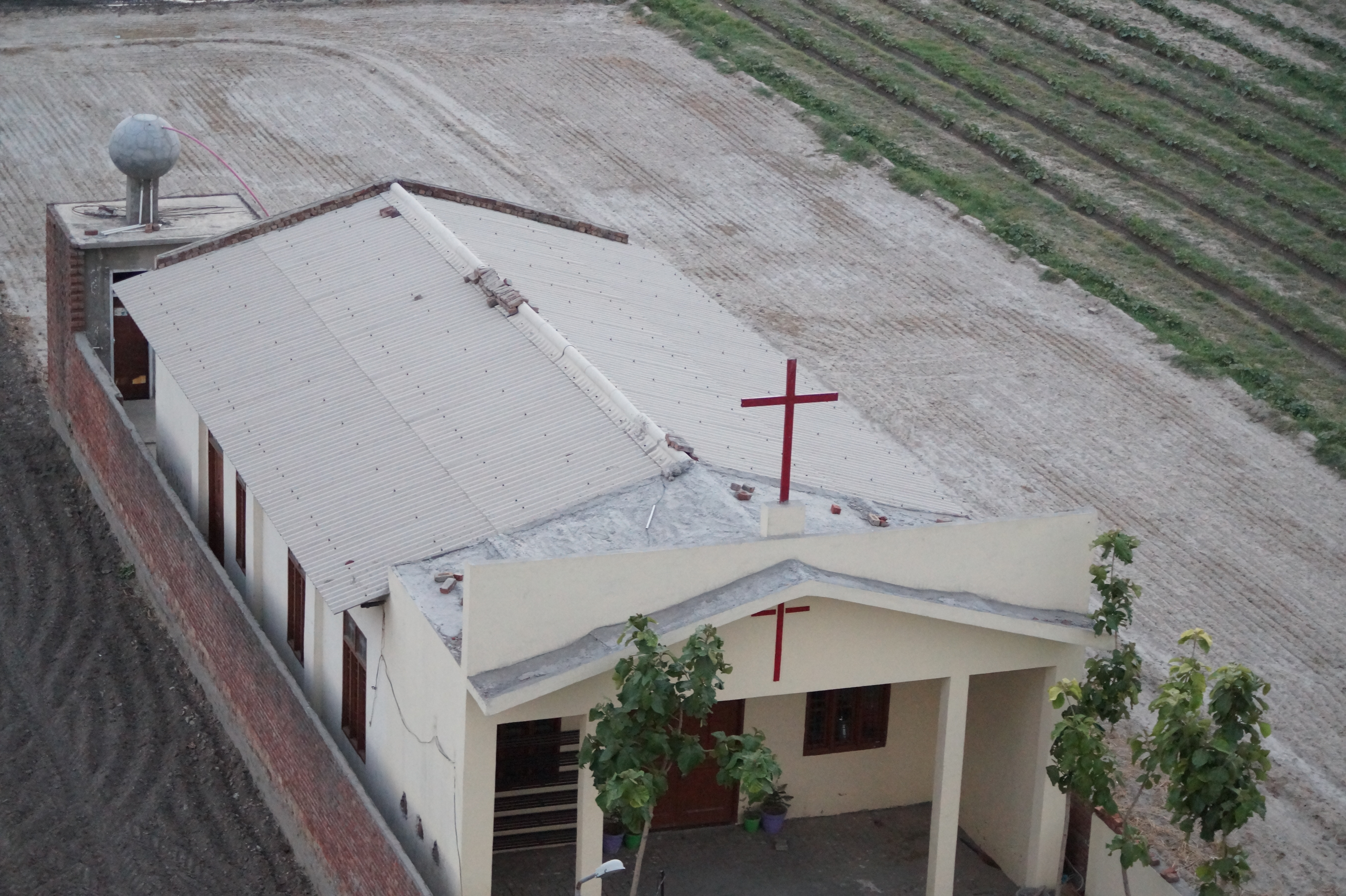
A Christian church in Nihal Singh Wala, Moga district, Punjab, India

Indian Punjab has become a region of one of the fastest-growing Christian populations in the world. Since the 2000s, around 5,000 homegrown Christian pastors from "independent churches" have made inroads in various parts of Indian Punjab and have converted many to Christianity by adopting the religion to Punjabi culture. They have successfully converted through oratory skills, healing claims, promising cures for diseases, miracle claims, finding a spouse, conceiving a child, promising jobs, and also visas for abroad. Another prominent aspect of their sessions are Gawahi (testimonies) of those who had converted.

These pastors have been criticized by mainstream Christian leaders, such as by Agnelo Rufino Gracias, apostolic administrator of Jalandhar Diocese, who states their activities are "not theologically sound" and their success are based on "quick-fix solutions". There are various major Christian pastors from the Pentecostal movement who are actively converting Indian Punjabis, namely Amrit Sandhu, Kanchan Mittal, Raman Hans, Gurnam Singh Khera, Harjit Singh, Sukhpal Rana, and Faris Masih. Bajinder Singh is a Christian preacher from Yamunanagar district of Haryana who has converted many Indian Punjabis to Christianity, he was active in Jalandhar and Mohali. Another evangelist is Ankur Narula, originally a Hindu, is based in Khambra village in Jalandhar district who has 300,000 followers. A pastor named Harpreet Deol, originally of a Sikh background, is based in Khojewal village on the Jalandhar-Kapurthala road and is the he president of the Pentecostal Church Prabandhak Committee (PCPC). There is also a woman pastor evangelist named Kanchan Mittal. With all this considered, in 2023 it was claimed by Michael Ani, a Roman Catholic missionary in Firozpur, that there was a total Christian population of 2.2 million in Indian Punjab, based upon 1.2 million mainstream Christians and 1.0 million independent church/pastor Christians. The pastors and their independent churches are concentrated in the Jalandhar, Moga, Gurdaspur, Amritsar, Ludhiana and Ferozepur districts, with around 7,000 out of the around 12,000 villages in Indian Punjab being influenced by them. Many of the Christian evangelist pastors don Sikh turbans whilst preaching in certain areas, such as the border belt of Amritsar, Ajnala and Ferozepur districts, they also do not change their original Hindu or Sikh names to traditional Christian ones. They keep a security detail that consists of three-tier security with personal bodyguards. They spread their reach through social media, including websites like YouTube, where the videos can gain millions of views and their channels have hundreds of thousands of subscribers. Most of the converts to the independent churches come from Mazhabi, Balmiki, Sansi, and Rai Sikh backgrounds seeking upward social mobility and improved living conditions, with there also being converts from Brahmin backgrounds. According to Manjit Singh, the success of Christianity in Indian Punjab in recent decades can be attributed to their high proportion of the state's population being from a Dalit background (32%) and how they were excluded from the Sikh power-structure, which made them susceptible to conversion to Christianity. Some converts convert for personal reasons, such as Ramjit Singh, who stated:

Sikhism taught me that there’s a god, the Bible showed me how to find Him.

— Ramjit Singh

According to India Today, there are now around 65,000 pastors ministering in Punjab. The growing influence of the Christian pastors have led to Punjabi politicians catering to them, as they have become vote-banks. However, they have been criticized for being motivated by economic interests, operating in a non-transparent manner, having controversial leaders, having shell companies and engaging in money-laundering, financial irregularities, pressuring followers to abandon medical treatment, promoting superstition, fraud, and issues with personal conduct. These independent churches/pastors compete with the deras for followers. Deras are religious sects that operate outside mainstream Sikhism but have many followers, with the independent churches/pastors being described as a Christian version of the deras by Pradip Kumar Samantaroy, bishop of the Amritsar Diocese. The ministries are financially-wealthy with their top-pastors living lavish lifestyles, and own much private property across the state. Some of the active "ministries" are as follows:

- Apostle Ankur Yoseph Narula Ministries
- Pastor Harpreet Deol Khojewala Ministries
- Pastor Amrit Sandhu Ministries
- Pastor Harjit Singh Ministries
- Pastor Manish Gill Ministries
- Pastor Kanchan Mittal Ministries
- Pastor Davinder Singh Ministries
- Pastor Raman Hans Ministries

In 2019, attempts to set-up a state-wide Christian body known as the Shiromani Church Parbandhak Committee (SCPC) to regulate the activities of the independent churches/pastors failed due to differences between the Christian groups of the state. In November 2021, the Pentecostal Church Parbandhak Committee (PCPC) was established by Pastor Harpreet Deol Khojewala Ministries to self-regulate the ministries active in the state, with it having 980 affiliated organizations. In April 2023, Christian organizations and leaders in the state launched the first Christian-affiliated political party, named the United Punjab Party (UPP), to represent the local Christian community's interests.

==== Conflict with Sikhs ====
The increasing Christian influence in the state has led to tensions with Sikh bodies, such as the SGPC. On 31 August 2022, the Sikh leader of the Akal Takht alleged that Christian missionaries are forcibly converting people of the state and demanded an anti-conversion law be brought up into the books. On the same day, a pastor's car was lit on fire in Thakarpur village of Tarn Taran district. On 19 May 2024, four Nihang Sikh men attacked a Christian pastor named Gurjeet Singh and his brother in Sultanwind village, Amritsar district, who were born Sikhs but converted to Christianity later in life, claiming Gurjeet insulted the kirpan sword of Sikhism and that he was converting people.

== Demographics ==
Christians in Punjab
Year	Number	Percentage
2001	292,800	1.20
2011	348,230	1.26

=== Percentage by district ===
S.No	District	Christianity
1	Amritsar	2.18%
2	Barnala	0.10%
3	Bathinda	0.18%
4	Faridkot	0.20%
5	Fatehgarh Sahib	0.28%
6	Firozpur	0.95%
7	Gurdaspur	7.68%
8	Hoshiarpur	0.94%
9	Jalandhar	1.19%
10	Kapurthala	0.67%
11	Ludhiana	0.47%
12	Mansa	0.12%
13	Moga	0.33%
14	Muktsar	0.19%
15	Patiala	0.30%
16	Rupnagar	0.31%
17	Mohali	0.54%
18	Sangrur	0.15%
19	Nawanshehar	0.24%
20	Tarn Taran	0.54%
Punjab (Total)		1.26%

=== Other population estimates ===
Whilst the 2011 census officially recorded 348,230 Christians, other estimates, such as by Michael Ani, claim the true Christian population is 2.2 million. There are other claims that the true Christian population percentage of the state is 15% when accounting from an upsurge of recent conversions.

== See also ==
- Punjabi Christians
- Christianity in Punjab, Pakistan
