= Church of Signs and Wonders =

- Location: Village Khambra, Jalandhar, Punjab
- Country: India
- Denomination: Pentecostalism
- Website: ankurnarula.org

History
- Founded: 2008
- Founder: Ankur Yoseph Narula

Ankur Narula Ministries (The Church of Signs and Wonders) is a church ministry in Punjab, India. It was established in 2008 in Jalandhar, Khambra. Ankur Yoseph Narula is the Senior Pastor and Overseer. It is a prosperity megachurch and follows Pentecostal Christianity, practicing exorcism, and claiming miraculous healing.

== History ==
Ankur Yoseph Narula is the Senior Pastor and Overseer in the Church of Signs and Wonders. Born in a non-Christian family, Ankur Narula accepted Christianity and started his ministry with 3 people in 2008. Weekly congregations are now in the region of 30,000

In April 2023, India's Income Tax department coordinated a series of raids against the church, investigating claims of money laundering and fraudulent cash transactions. The raids related to a 2020 complaint brought by the Legal Rights Observatory with the Union Home Ministry, who claimed that a UK registered shell company was being used to launder foreign donations for tax purposes.

== See also ==
1. Punjabi Christians
2. Christianity in Punjab, India
3. Christianity in India

== Bibliography ==
- "About Ankur Narula Ministries". ankurnarula.org. Church of Signs and Wonders.
- Corrigan, John; McAlister, Melani; Schäfer, Axel R. (15 September 2022). Global Faith, Worldly Power: Evangelical Internationalism and U.S. Empire. UNC Press Books. ISBN 978-1-4696-7060-7.
- "IT raids pastor Ankur Narula's churches in Punjab". Hindustan Times. 26 April 2023.
- "Punjab: Fake healing pastor Ankur Narula's church & Bible college raided by IT". hindupost.in. 28 April 2023.
- "Income-tax raids on self-styled pastor's Jalandhar assets". The Times of India. 26 April 2023.
