= Mesih Mehmed Pasha Mosque =

Mosque in Fatih, Istanbul, Turkey

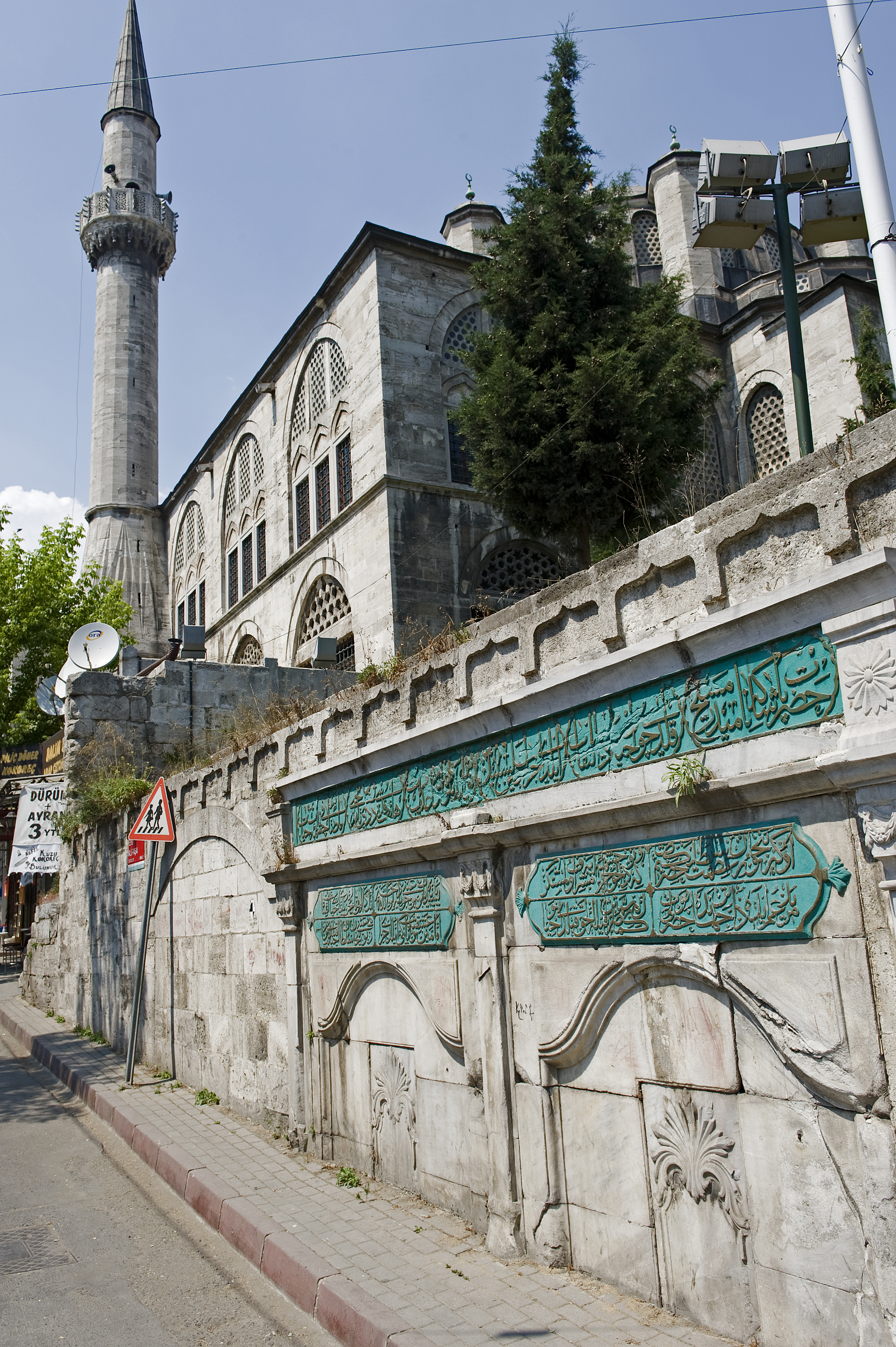

- Location within the Fatih district of Istanbul

Religion
- Affiliation: Sunni Islam

Location
- Location: Hırka-i Şerif, Fatih, Istanbul
- Coordinates: 41.0219°N 28.9434°E

Architecture
- Architect: Mimar Sinan
- Type: Mosque
- Groundbreaking: 1584-85
- Completed: 1585-86

Specifications
- Dome dia. (outer): 12.8 metres (42 ft)
- Minaret: 1

Mesih Mehmed Pasha Mosque (Turkish: Mesih Mehmed Paşa Camii) is a 16th-century Ottoman mosque in the Fatih district of Istanbul, Turkey. It was commissioned by one of Murad III's grand viziers, Mesih Mehmed Pasha, and designed by the imperial architect Mimar Sinan. The mosque was completed in 1585–86.

== History ==
The mosque was commissioned in 1584 by the eunuch Mesih Mehmed Pasha while he held the post of third vizier. Mesih Pasha had worked for nearly six years in Cairo as the governor-general of Egypt before returning to Istanbul in 1581. He became second vizier in July 1584 and then grand vizier for the four-month period from 1 December 1585 until 15 April 1586. He died in 1589 and was buried by his mosque.

It is unclear to what extent the imperial architect Mimar Sinan was involved in the design of the mosque. Sinan went on a hajj to Mecca in 1584 and during his absence his place was taken by the royal architect Mehmed Subaşı. Sinan included the mosque in the list of his works in a draft of his autobiography (Tuḥfetü’l-miʿmārīn) but omitted it from a later version (Teẕkiretü’l-ebniye). The foundation inscription on the mosque gives the completion date as AH 994 (1585–86). The triple water fountain on the southwest corner of the perimeter wall has an inscription with the same date. The fountain was refurbished in 1817–18. In 1587 Mesih Pasha obtained permission to be buried next to his mosque. He died in 1589.

== Architecture ==
=== Exterior ===
The mosque is built on a sloping site that is higher on the eastern side. To create a level surface the western side of the building rests on a vaulted substructure that accommodates a series of shops. To the north of the mosque is a rectangular forecourt surrounded on three sides by an arcade with pillars that support small domes. The entrance from the street below is through a domed gatehouse at the side. Beneath the northern section of the arcade are a series of taps for the ritual ablutions. Instead of the usual fountain, at the centre of the forecourt is the grave of Mesih Pasha. The north façade of the mosque has a double portico with five arches. The columns of the inner portico support five small domes.

The lead covered main dome has a diameter of 12.8 metres (42 ft). It rests on a drum with 24 windows that is encircled by eight stabilizing turrets that sit on the internal piers. There are also five half-domes that form the exedra of the mihrab and the exedras at the four corners. The aisles at each side of the mosque are covered by three small domes. The windows on the lower levels are grouped by large framing arches.

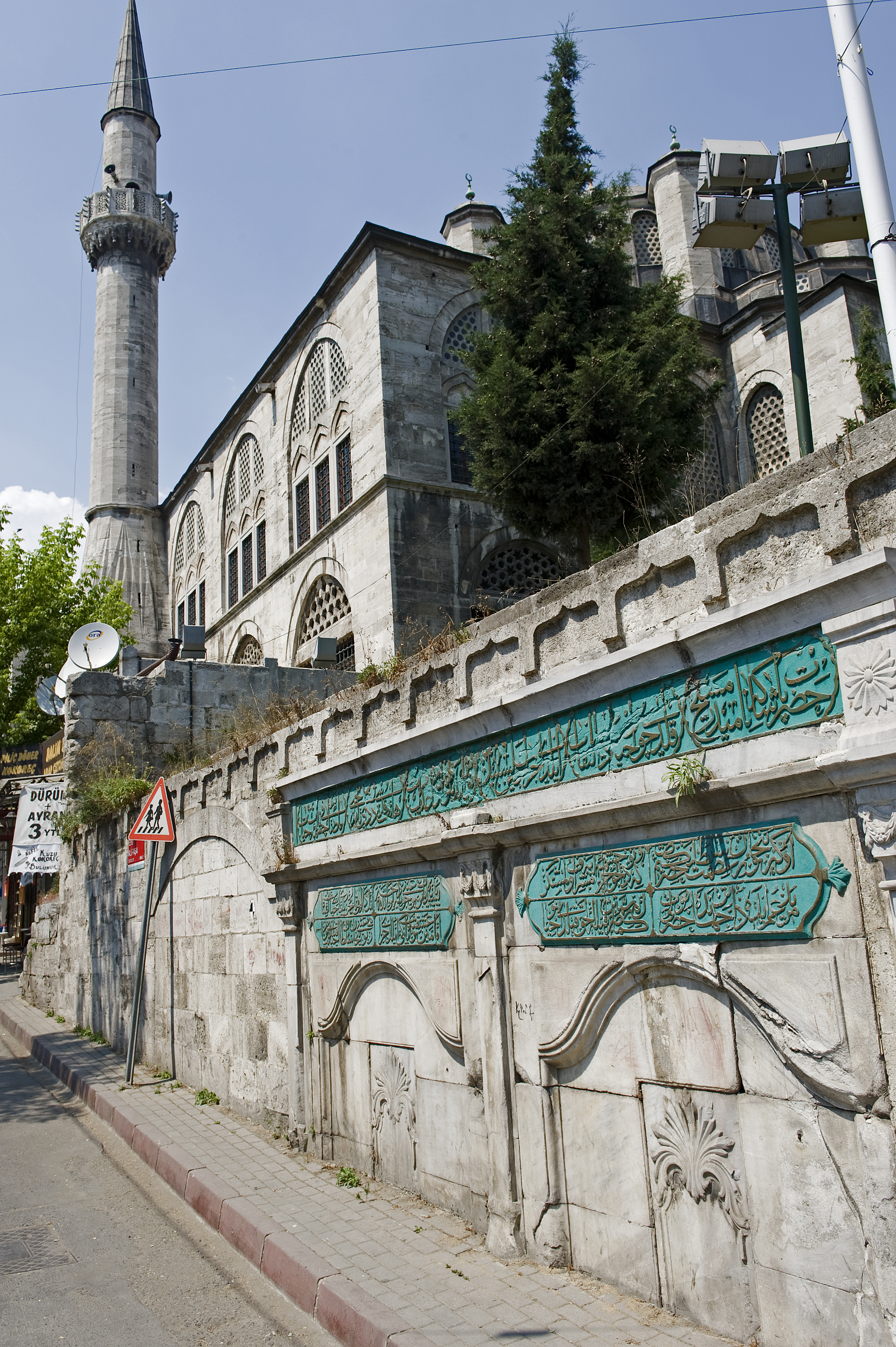
Mesih Mehmed Pasha Mosque from street

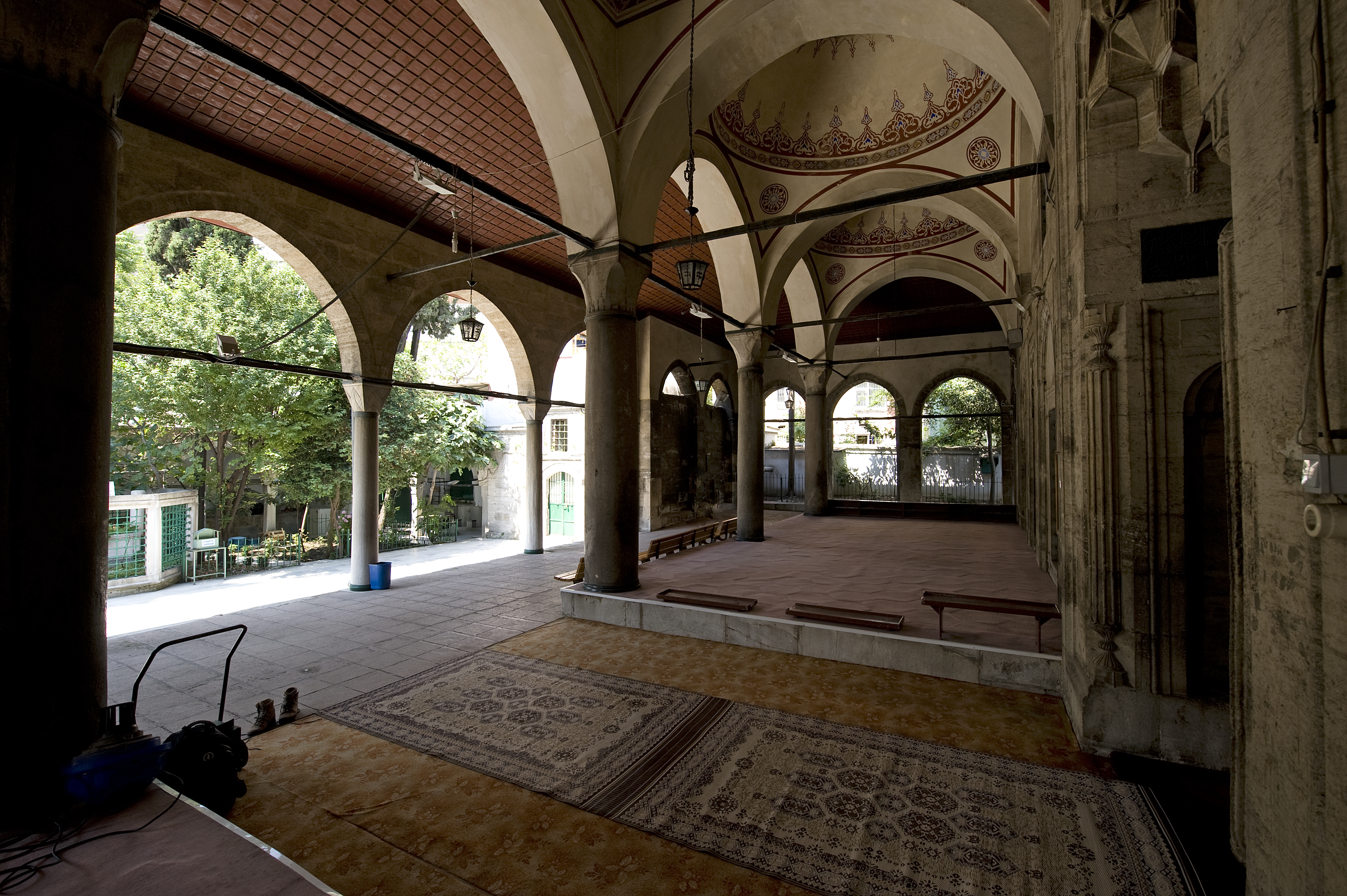
Mesih Mehmed Pasha Mosque son cemaat area

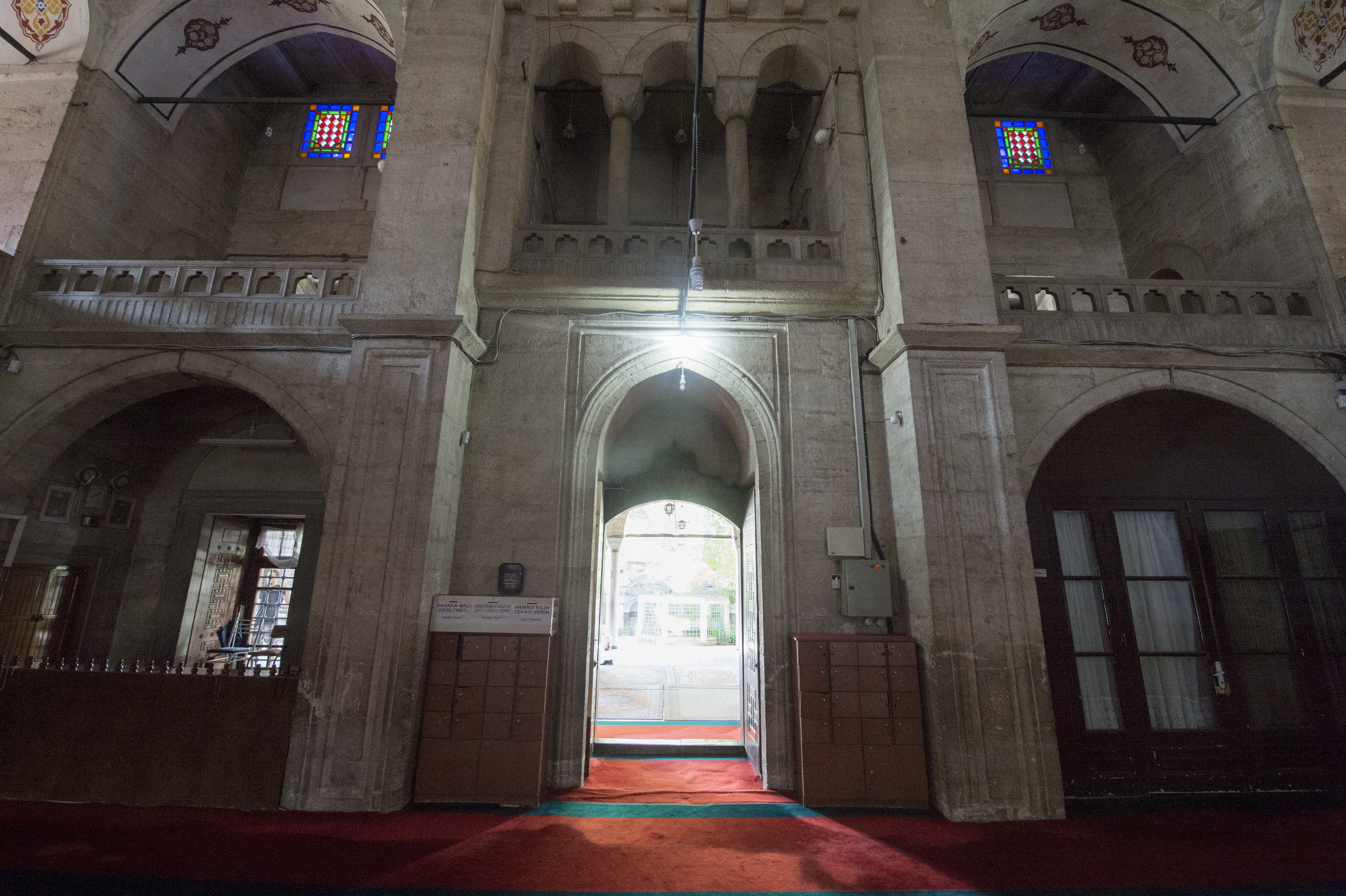
Mesih Mehmed Pasha Mosque interior with entrance

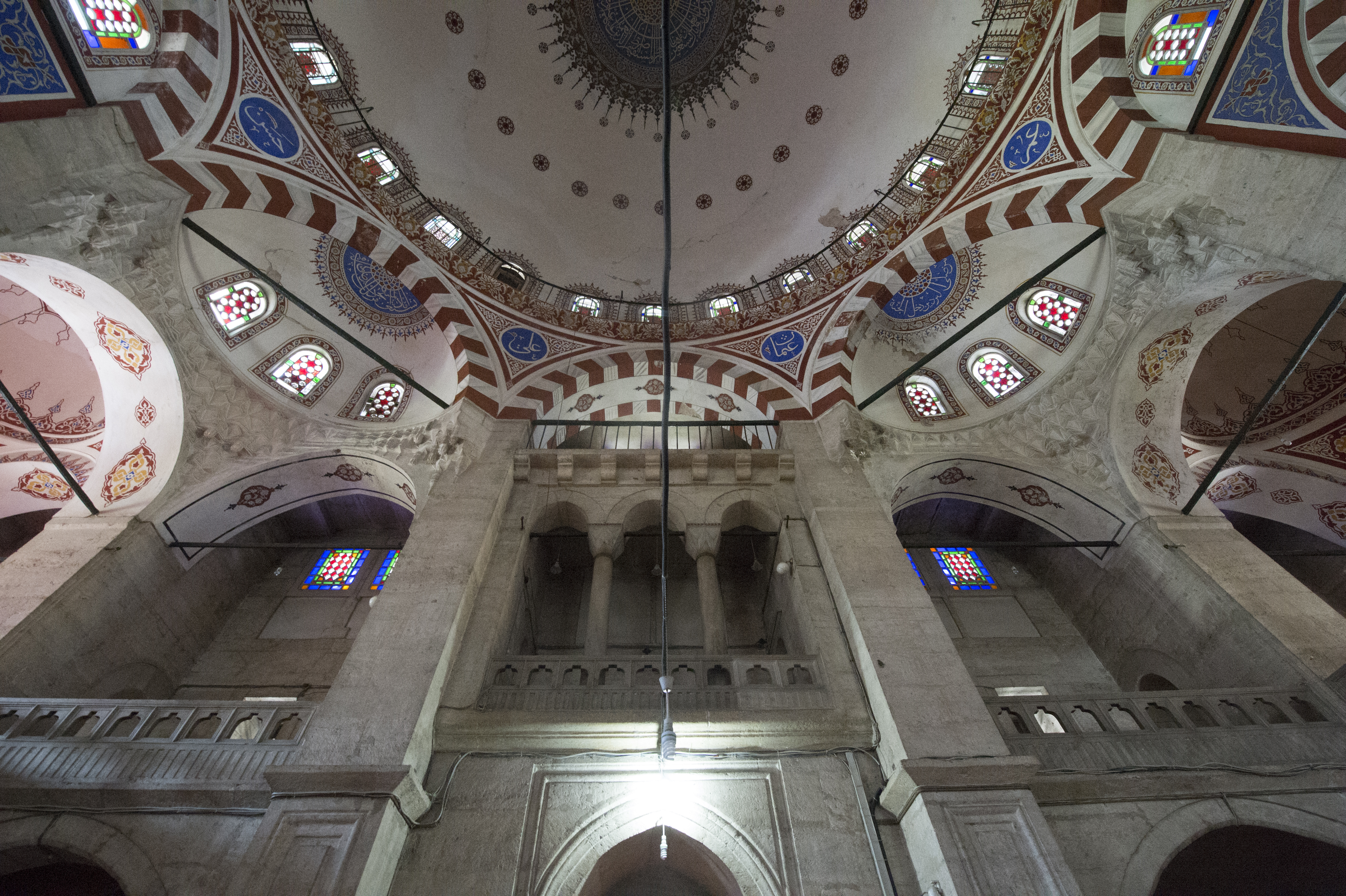
Mesih Mehmed Pasha Mosque interior towards entrance

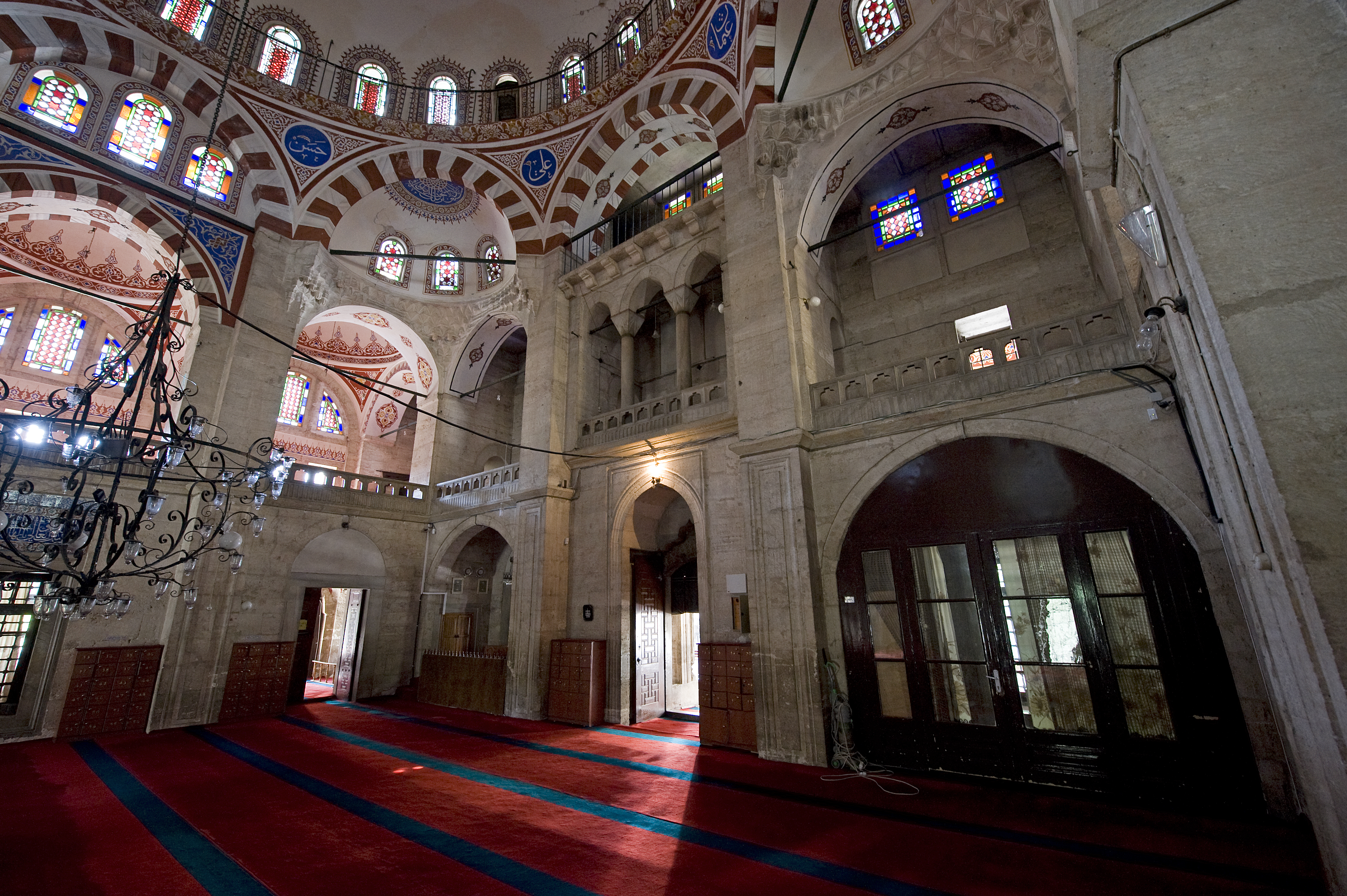
Mesih Mehmed Pasha Mosque interior

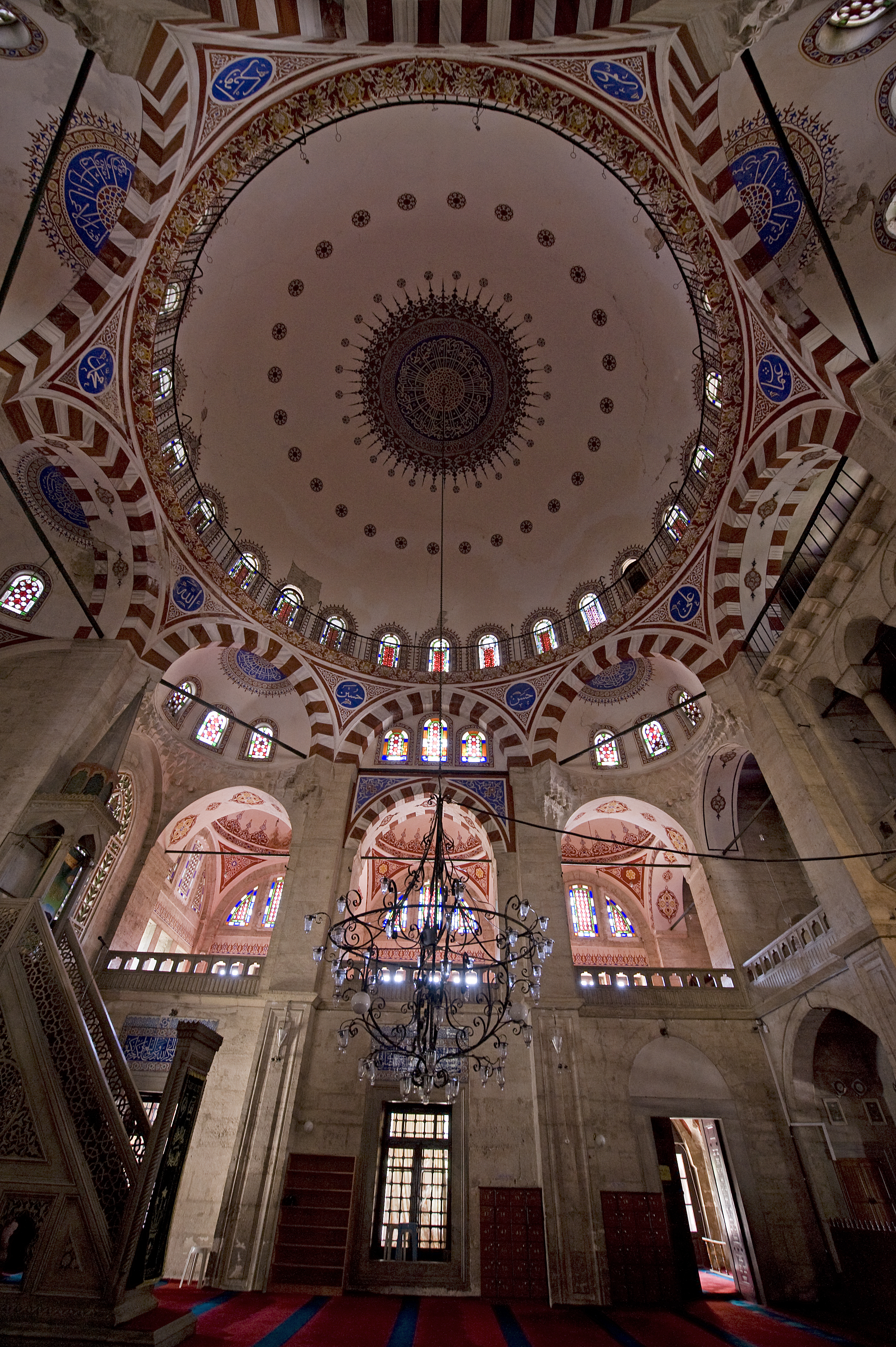
Mesih Mehmed Pasha Mosque dome

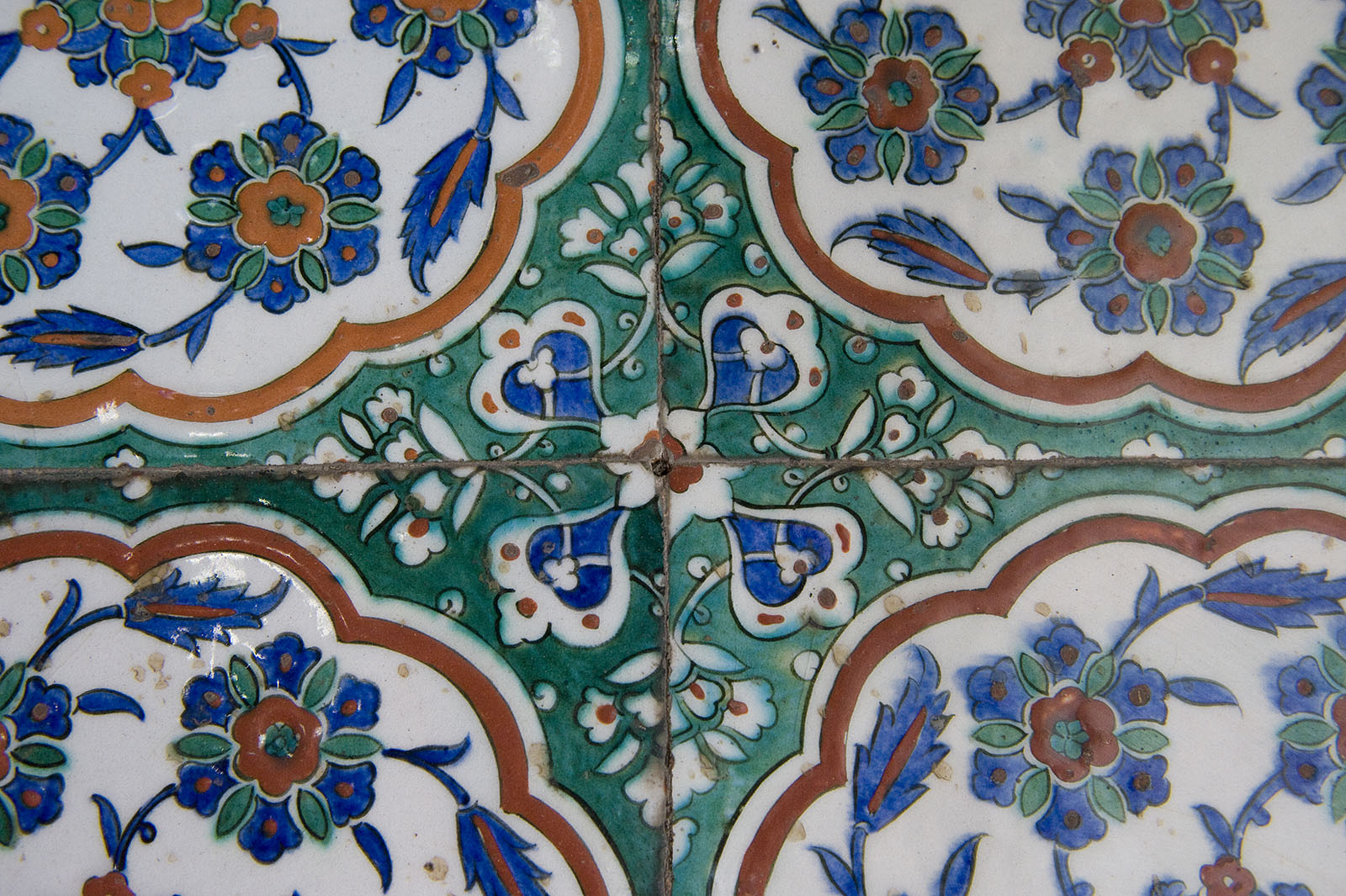
Mesih Mehmed Pasha Mosque tiles

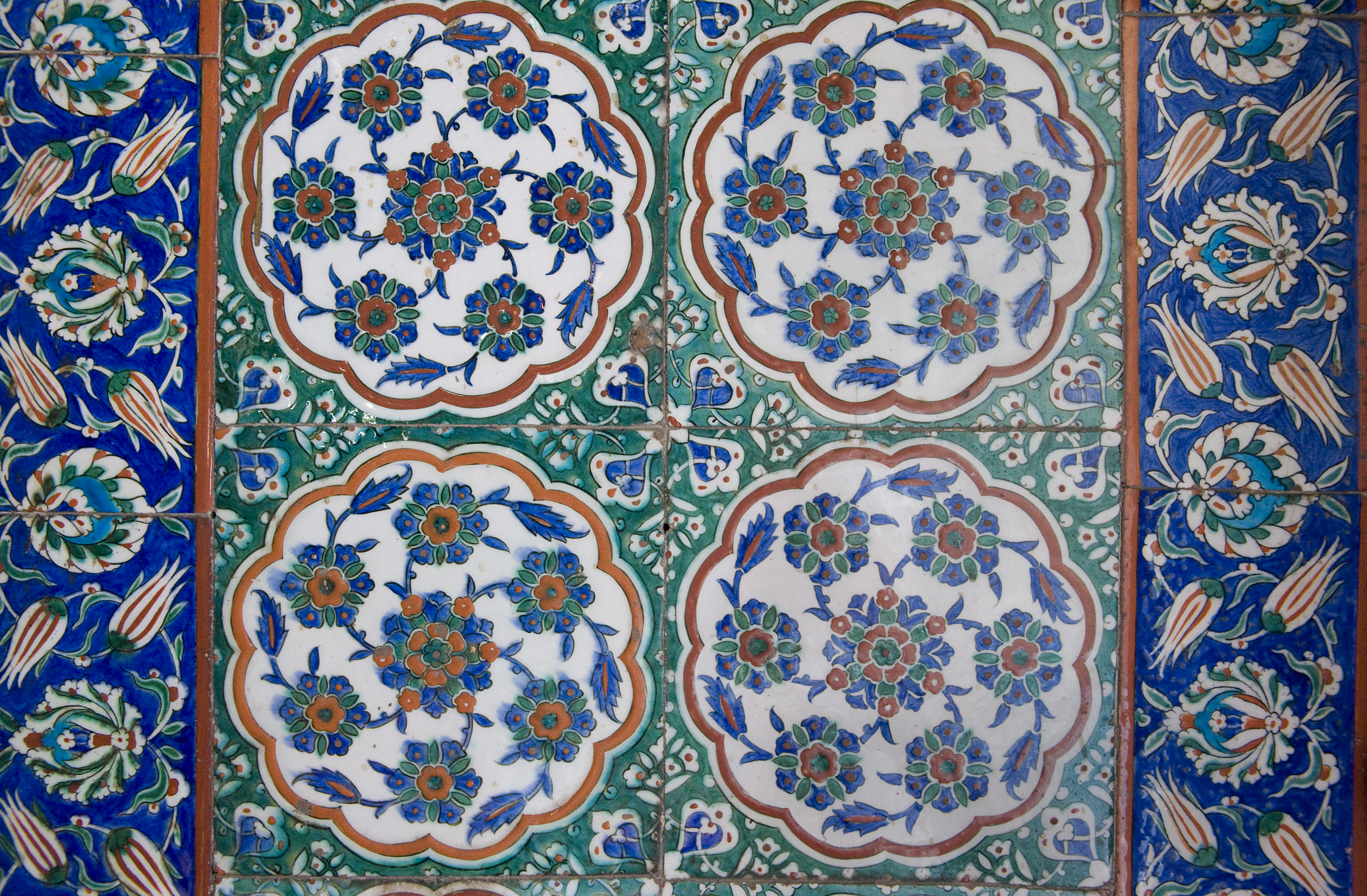
Mesih Mehmed Pasha Mosque tiles

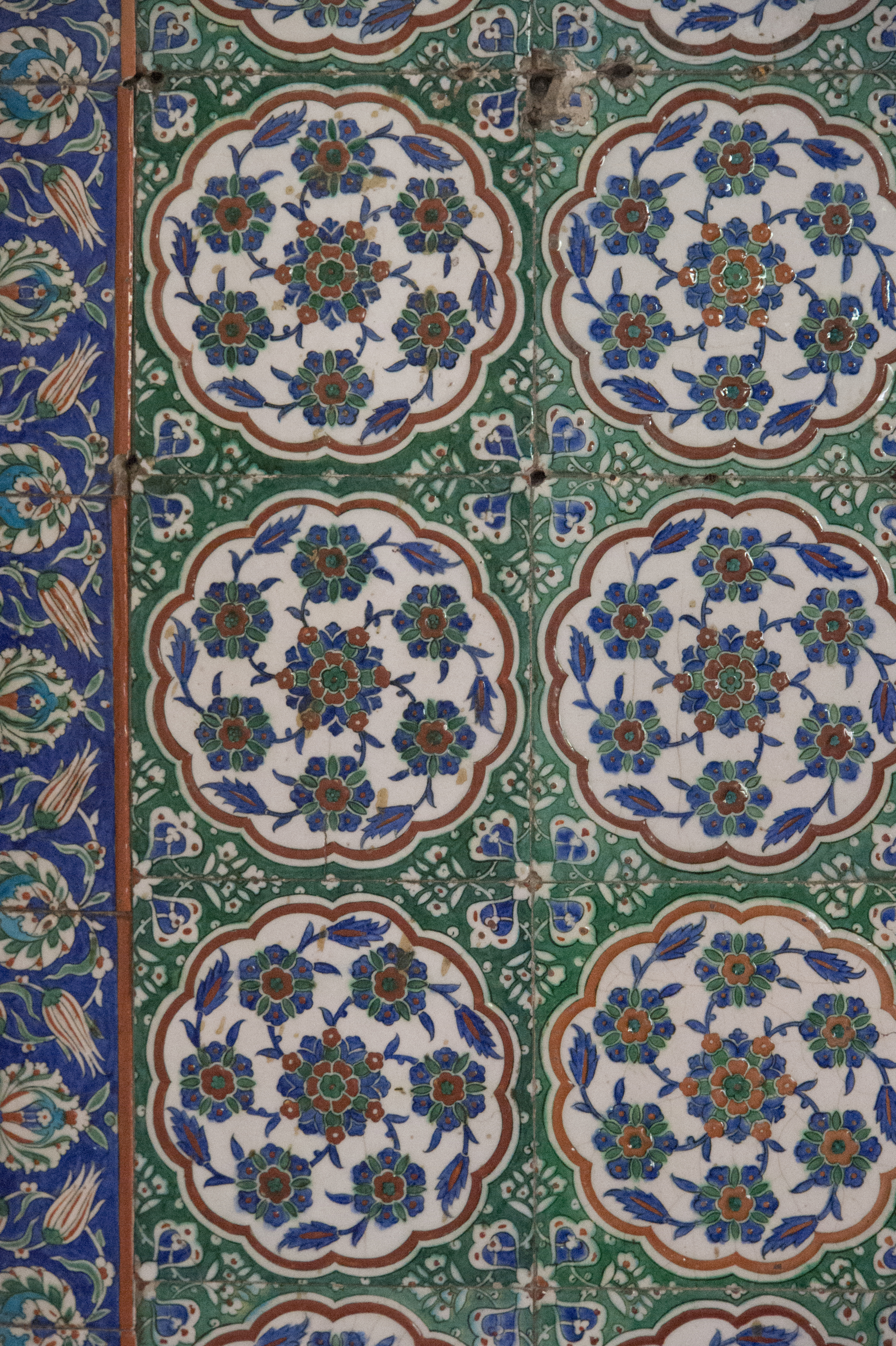
Mesih Pasha Mosque tiles

== See also ==
- List of Friday mosques designed by Mimar Sinan

== Sources ==
- Necipoğlu, Gülru (2005). The Age of Sinan: Architectural Culture in the Ottoman Empire. London: Reaktion Books. ISBN 978-1-86189-253-9.
