= John V Sarugoyo =

John IV Sarugoyo
- Maphrian of the Syriac Orthodox Church
- Church: Syriac Orthodox Church
- Archdiocese: Maphrianate of the East
- Diocese: Mosul and Nineveh
- In office: 1164-1189
- Predecessor: Ignatius II Lazarus
- Successor: Gregorius Jacob

Orders
- Consecration: 1165 by Athanasius VII bar Qutreh
- Rank: Maphrian

Personal details
- Born: Serugh
- Died: 1189

John IV Sarugoyo was the Maphrian of the East of the Syriac Orthodox Church, from 1164 until his death in 1189.

== Biography ==
From 1180 to 1204, the church suffered from division as Theodore Bar Wahbun, Karim Bar Masih, and their supporters attempted to usurp the patriarchal office from the patriarch Michael I Rabo. Having been forced to flee Mardin, Theodore and Karim travelled to the Monastery of Mar Mattai near Mosul to attempt to convince John to support his claim to the patriarchal office, but he refused.

Theodore and Karim travelled throughout Upper Mesopotamia as they attempted to gather supporters and later arranged to meet with dignitaries of Michael I Rabo in Dara. Upon learning that the usurpers were in Dara, John and several bishops travelled there, captured, and brought them before the patriarch in the Monastery of Mar Barsoum near Melitene. They later escaped the monastery and continued to disrupt the church beyond John's death in 1189 and Karim later had himself ordained as maphrian without the authorisation of Michael I, and assumed the name Dionysius.

== Bibliography ==
- Moosa, Matti (2008). "The Christians Under Turkish Rule". The Crusades: Conflict Between Christendom and Islam. Gorgias Press. Archived from the original on 2016-03-04.

Preceded by Ignatius II Lazarus	Syriac Orthodox Maphrian of the East; 1164-1189	Succeeded by Gregorius Jacob
