= Bajinder Singh =

Indian Christian pastor

- Born: 10 September 1982 (age 44); Yamunanagar, Haryana, India
- Organization(s): Church of Glory and Wisdom
- Status: Incarcerated
- Criminal charges: Rape
- Penalty: Life imprisonment under IPC sections 376 (rape), 323 (voluntarily causing hurt), and 506 (criminal intimidation)

Details
- Victims: 1 (unnamed woman)
- Imprisoned at: Central Jail, Patiala
- Website: Official website

Bajinder Singh (born 10 September 1982) is an Indian Evangelical Christian pastor and a convicted rapist. He gained popularity for his claimed miracle healings and for attracting a considerable following through his ministry, the Church of Glory and Wisdom.

His ministry operates several branches in Punjab and other locations, and he is known for holding large prayer meetings that are often accompanied by public performances. He was sentenced to life imprisonment on 1 April 2025.

== Background ==
Bajinder was born in Yamunanagar, Haryana , into a Hindu family and holds a degree in mechanical engineering. He was jailed for murder during the early 2000s.

After his release, he began conducting prayer meetings in 2012. His ministry claims to offer miraculous healings and solutions to various health ailments.

== Early incidents ==
- In 2006, Singh was reported to have been charged with assault and intimidation.
- In 2014, he faced charges under Section 295A of the Indian Penal Code in Karnal for allegedly inciting religious tension.

== Controversy ==
In 2018, he was arrested in connection with a rape case involving a woman from Zirakpur, Punjab. It was alleged that he sexually assaulted the victim under the pretext of offering her travel opportunities abroad. Various families have also accused him of exploiting vulnerable members of the community through financial fraud, including demanding large sums of money for healing services that alleged did not produce results.

Bajinder was arrested by Punjab police on accusations of rape and sexual abuse by a woman who attended the church.

In March 2025, at the same time as the sexual abuse case, a video went viral showing Bajinder assaulting a man and a woman in his office. On 28 March 2025, he was found guilty in the 2018 rape case by a local court in Sahibzada Ajit Singh Nagar, and sentenced to life imprisonment.

=== Investigations ===
==== 2023 ====
Between 31 January and 1 February 2023, the Income Tax Department carried out simultaneous raids on about 50 officials in different cities including Jalandhar, Kapurthala, Amritsar, New Chandigarh, Mohali, and Kurali, and on the premises of some churches. The 16-hour raids are stated to have led to the seizure of approximately ₹2 crore in un Accounted money and documentation concerning properties, assets, foreign donations, application of donations, and establishment of overseas centres in cities including Dubai and Mauritius.

==== 2025 ====
In August 2025, Singh, lodged in a life sentence on the earlier encounter, was produced before Bharatpur under a production warrant. He was involved in an investigation related to a racket of religious conversion. He was probed for the mass conversion in February 2024 held at Sonar Haveli in Atal Bandh, Bharatpur. The incident was a case of vulnerable persons being hired guaranteed, children and women, also sickly young men, with promises of food, drinks & money gift. Images of politicians were displayed on large television screens and audio players played videos of them, while audience members were invited to step on pictures of Hindu deities, according to reports.

Religious literature was seized from the premises and 3 individuals were detained as part of the investigation. Officials also uncovered money transactions associated with his accounts, including international funds that had allegedly been siphoned off. He was presented in Bharatpur court on August 23, 2025, and remanded to 15 days judicial custody at Sewar Prison. The next day Rajasthan Police handed him back to the Mansa Prison.

== Influence ==
Bajinder has gained influence in Punjab through his engagement with celebrities and politicians. He invites celebrities from the entertainment industry and local politicians to participate in his church prayer meetings and functions, which often leads to increased attendance and awareness. Many people have publicly supported his events which has led to allegations of promoting celebrities.
