= Ijaz Masih =

Pakistani politician

Member of the Provincial Assembly of Punjab
- In office 15 August 2018 – 21 May 2022
- Constituency: Reserved seat for minorities

Personal details
- Party: IPP (2023-present)
- Other political affiliations: PTI (2018-2022)

Ijaz Masih (Urdu: اعجاز مسیح) is a Pakistani politician who was elected member for the Provincial Assembly of Punjab from August 2018 to May 2022.

== Political career ==
He was elected to the Provincial Assembly of Punjab on a reserved seat for minorities in the 2018 Pakistani general election representing Pakistan Tehreek-e-Insaf.

On 12 September 2018 he was inducted into the provincial Punjab cabinet of Chief Minister Sardar Usman Buzdar. On 13 September 2018 he was appointed as Provincial Minister of Punjab for Human Rights & Minorities Affairs.

He de-seated due to his vote against party policy for Chief Minister of Punjab election on 16 April 2022.
