= Jai Masih Ki =

Jai Masih Ki (Hindi: जय मसीह की, Urdu: جے مسیح کی, translation: Victory to Christ or Praise the Messiah) or Jai Yeshu Ki (Hindi: जय येशु की, Urdu: جے یسوع کی, translation: Victory to Jesus or Praise Jesus) are Hindi-Urdu greeting phrases used by Christians in the northern parts of the Indian subcontinent. Their use by individuals identifies a person as a Christian, in the region of North India and Pakistan where greetings based on religion are customary. The phrases have been incorporated into several North-Indian Christian hymns. In response to what is perceived as a victory for the Christian community, many believers use the salutation to praise God, such as when Asia Bibi was allowed to appeal her case to the Supreme Court of Pakistan.

== See also ==
- Christianity in India
- Christianity in Pakistan
- Masih (surname)
- Khuda Hafiz
