= Mesihi of Prishtina =

Ottoman poet

Mesihi (Messiah) of Prishtina, known in Ottoman Turkish as Priştinali Mesihi, was one of the best known Ottoman poets of the late 15th and early 16th centuries during the Bayezid II era and is regarded as one of the earliest Albanian poets.

== Life and work ==
He was born in Pristina in Ottoman Empire (now Kosovo) possibly around 1470. He was an Albanian born Isa. He moved to Istanbul at an early age and lived there until his death around 1512.

Mesihi became a softa, a theological or madrasa student, and soon distinguished himself as a calligrapher. He was able to gain the support of the Grand Vizier Khadim Ali Pasha, and became his diwan secretary, who had had plenty of reasons to be annoyed with Mesihi. Mesihi is mentioned as undisciplined, running after a pleasure-oriented life, and conscienceless toward his official duties. The vizier, of Albanian descent himself, is quoted to have called him "street-Arab" or "street boy" (Ottoman: Sheher Oglani). Nevertheless, Mesihi held his position until Khadim Pasha died in 1511 during the Şahkulu Rebellion. Mesihi composed a deeply felt elegy on Vizier's death. He tried to get the protection of other high rank officials. According to Ashik Çelebi, he did not succeed in getting protection from Yunus Pasha or Nishandji Tadji-zade Dja'fer Çelebi, and also failed in his attempts to get patronage from Selim I. According to the French scholar Victor L. Ménage, he was in service of Yunnus Pasha, which seems to be more reliable.

Mesihi's place in the Ottoman diwan poetry is that of a highly gifted and original poet. His language is relatively plain and clear, his manner devoid of affectation. A touch of Rumelian dialect here and there is of particular interest. Mesihi's not-especially voluminous diwan has not been printed. Several critical studies on his work exist. His Murabba' -i bahâr (Ode to Spring) was translated and published by the Orientalist Sir William Jones, and remained for a long time the best known Turkish poem in Europe. His Shehr-engiz became popular and he had many followers in this poetic genre. He is regarded as "the third great Ottoman poet and the greatest lyric poet before Bâkî".
