= Arif Masih Bhatti =

Pakistani politician

Member of the Provincial Assembly of Sindh
- In office June 2013 – 28 May 2018
- Constituency: Reserved seat for minorities

Personal details
- Born: 11 April 1970 (age 56) Sialkot, Punjab, Pakistan

Arif Masih Bhatti is a Pakistani politician who had been a Member of the Provincial Assembly of Sindh, from June 2013 to May 2018.

== Early life ==
He was born on 11 April 1970 in Sialkot.

== Political career ==
He was elected to the Provincial Assembly of Sindh as a candidate of Muttahida Qaumi Movement (MQM) on reserved seat for minorities in the 2013 Pakistani general election.

In June 2017, he quit MQM to join Pakistan Peoples Party.
