= Hadim Mesih Pasha =

Grand Vizier of the Ottoman Empire from 1585 to 1586

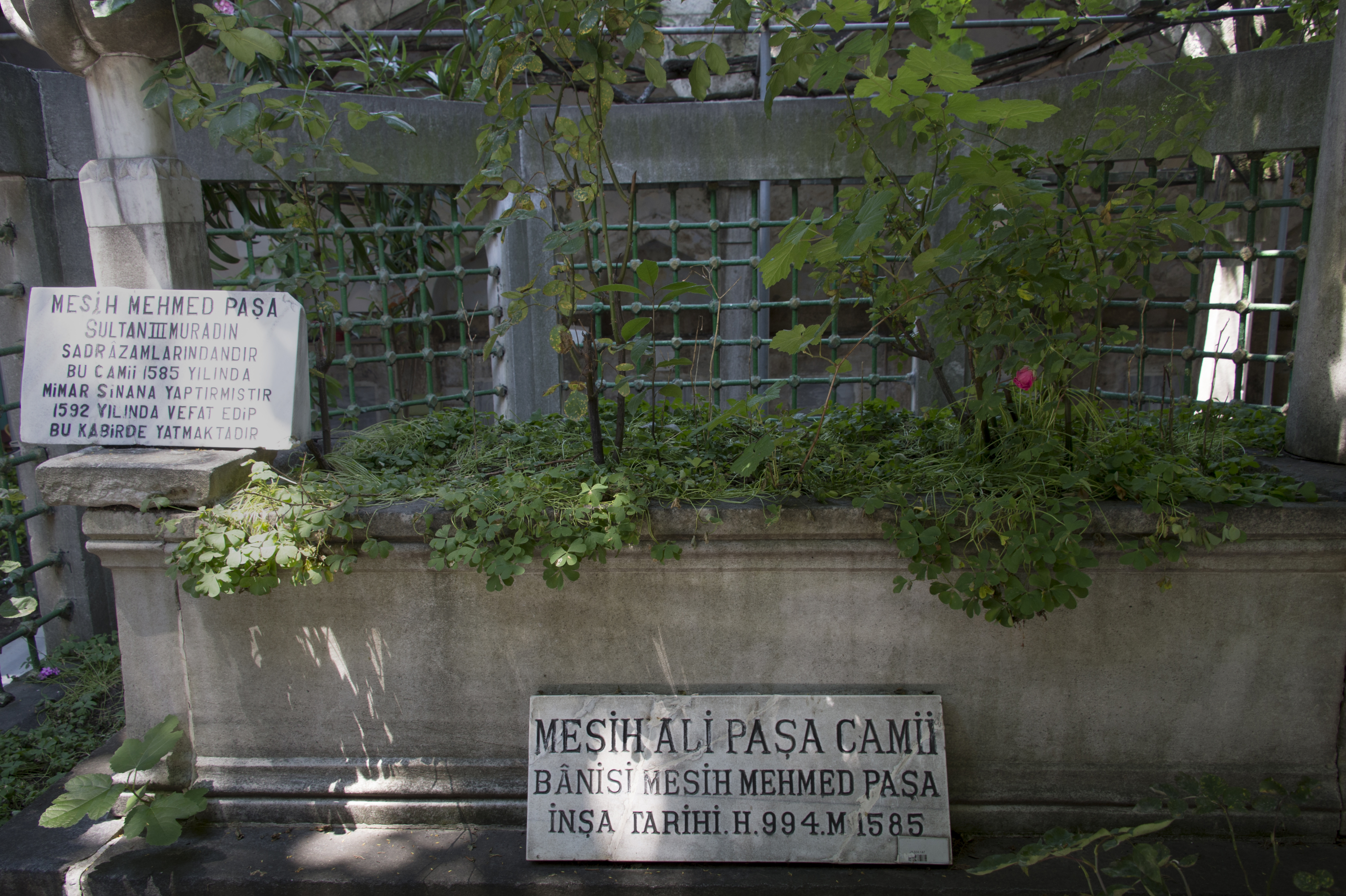
Tomb of Mesih Pasha in Istanbul, in the cemetery adjoining his mosque

Hadim Mesih Pasha (Ottoman Turkish: خادم مسيح پاشا; died 1589) was an Ottoman statesman who served as Grand Vizier under Murad III from 1 December 1585 until 15 April 1586.

Masih Pasha was born in Bosnia to a Christian family. As a eunuch he served as chief of the inner pantry and treasury of the imperial palace. In 1574 he was sent to Cairo as governor-general of Egypt. During his time in Egypt, he was known for his eagerness in enforcing the law, including with the use of capital punishment. He was also close to a Shafi'i teacher (shaykh) named Nur al-Din Abi al-Hasan 'Ali al-Qarafi al-Ansari. As pasha, he commissioned the construction of a madrasa and a religious complex to which he appointed Nur al-Din as shaykh. Dated to 1575, the remaining portion of this complex is known today as the Mosque of Messih Pasha.

On his return to the capital in 1581 he became the third vizier. He was promoted to second vizier in July 1584 and in November 1585 he substituted for Özdemiroğlu Osman Pasha when Osman Pasha left the capital on a campaign against the Safavids. On Osman Pasha's death Masih Pasha was appointed as Grand Vizier on 1 December 1585, a post he only held until 15 April 1586. He died in 1589 and was buried in a tomb next to the mosque that he had commissioned in Istanbul.

== See also ==
- List of Ottoman grand viziers
- List of Ottoman governors of Egypt

== Sources ==
- Karim, Chahinda (2021). Ottoman Cairo: Religious Architecture from Sultan Selim to Napoleon. American University in Cairo Press. ISBN 978-1-64903-193-8.
- Necipoğlu, Gülru (2005). The Age of Sinan: Architectural Culture in the Ottoman Empire. London: Reaktion Books. ISBN 978-1-86189-253-9.

Political offices
Preceded by Hüseyin Pasha Boljanić	Ottoman Governor of Egypt; 1574–1580	Succeeded by Hadım Hasan Pasha
Preceded by Özdemiroğlu Osman Pasha	Grand Vizier of the Ottoman Empire; 1 November 1585 – 14 April 1586	Succeeded by Kanijeli Siyavuş Pasha
