= Dionysius bar Masih =

- Maphrian of the Syriac Orthodox Church
- Church: Syriac Orthodox Church
- Archdiocese: Maphrianate of the East
- Diocese: Mosul and Nineveh
- In office: 1189-1204
- Predecessor: John IV Sarugoyo
- Successor: Gregorius Jacob

Orders
- Rank: Maphrian (illegitimate)

Personal details
- Born: Karim Bar Masih
- Died: 24 December 1204 Miyafarqin

Dionysius bar Masih was an illegitimate Maphrian of the East of the Syriac Orthodox Church, and rivalled Gregorius Jacob, the legitimate Maphrian, from 1189 until his death in 1204.

Karim Bar Masih was a member of the family of Jabir, which was originally from Tagrit, but had moved to Mosul due to Islamic persecution in the 11th century. Bar Masih became a monk at the Monastery of Mar Mattai and later supported Theodore bar Wahbun, an illegitimate patriarch who led a faction within the church that were displeased with Michael I Rabo, Patriarch of Antioch and head of the Syriac Orthodox Church, and his strict implementation of church canons.

In 1189, Bar Masih travelled to Mardin, the patriarchal see, and bribed Abu al-Qasim Hasan, the governor of Amid, for his permission to seize control of the see and ordain Theodore Bar Wahbun as patriarch. Bishop Ibrahim of Amid, a supporter of Bar Wahbun, was sent to deliver the news to Bar Wahbun, but Hasan's death and succession by his son forced the faction to offer a larger bribe to Hasan's son. The Syriac Orthodox community of Amid protested to the new governor who agreed to expel Bar Wahbun and his supporters if Michael I met with him. Upon discovering Michael I was to travel to Amid, Bar Masih and the other faction members seized the diocesan church of Mardin and ordained Bar Wahbun as patriarch at night, and fled to Mosul in the morning.

At Mosul, Bar Wahbun and Bar Masih unsuccessfully attempted to convince John IV Sarugoyo, Maphrian of the East, to support Bar Wahbun, and subsequently travelled throughout Upper Mesopotamia until their capture at Dara. They were taken to the Monastery of Mar Barsoum where they were condemned by the patriarch and a council of bishops. Bar Wahbun and Bar Masih escaped from the monastery and Bar Masih travelled to Tagrit, aiming to usurp the maphrianate. The death of John IV in 1189 left the seat of maphrian vacant, and Bar Masih gained the support of Muhyi al-Din, a Muslim judge of Mosul responsible for collecting tribute from local monasteries, such as the Monastery of Mar Mattai, and key adviser to the governor of Mosul. He also levied the support of the archimandrite, several monks of the Monastery of Mar Mattai, Ignatius Gabriel Yuhanna bar Hindi, Bishop of Urmia, Yuhanna Ruwad Marqia, Bishop of Ba'arbaya, Saliba, Bishop of the Monastery of Mar Mattai, and Basilius Matta bar Shuwayk, bishop of Baghdad.

The Syriac Orthodox communities of Mosul and Tagrit informed Michael I they would not acknowledge Bar Masih as maphrian, and he ordained his nephew Jacob as maphrian at the Monastery of Mar Dumit in 1189, upon which he took the name Gregorius. Bar Masih bribed the governor of Mosul and was ordained as maphrian by his supporters at the Monastery of Mar Mattai, assuming the name Dionysius. The death of Muhyi al-Din soon after allowed the Syriac Orthodox population of Mosul to petition Mujahid al-Din to allow Gregorius Jacob to take his seat at Mosul, as he had been barred from the city of Muhyi al-Din. Mujahid al-Din complied and Bar Masih travelled to Tagrit, where he was rejected by the Syriac Orthodox Christians there, and returned to Mosul. Bar Masih was defrocked and imprisoned upon his return to Mosul; he remained imprisoned for a year before his brother paid 400 dinars for his release.

In 1193, Bar Masih bribed the governor of Mosul 1000 dinars thus allowing him to proclaim himself Bishop of Mosul, and he unsuccessfully attempted to gather followers in the surrounding region. Bar Masih defaulted on his debts and was imprisoned for 18 months until Gregorius Jacob had him released from prison. Bar Masih repaid a portion of his debts a year after his release, but was later imprisoned in 1199 and granted release with the aid of Gregorius Jacob. Unable to repay his huge debts, he fled from Mosul to Mardin, then to Amid, and then to Miyafarqin. Bar Masih arranged for himself to become a bishop with the help of the governor, but was condemned by a church council. Athanasius VIII absolved Bar Masih, who died on 24 December 1204, and was buried by Nestorians, a rival Christian church, as the Syriac Orthodox community refused to bury him.

== Bibliography ==
- Moosa, Matti (2008). "The Christians Under Turkish Rule". The Crusades: Conflict Between Christendom and Islam. Gorgias Press. Archived from the original on 2016-03-04.

Preceded by John IV Sarugoyo	Syriac Orthodox Maphrian of the East; 1189-1204	Succeeded by Gregorius Jacob
