= Death of Shazia Masih =

Shazia Masih
- Born: May 20, 1997
- Died: January 22, 2010 (aged 12); Lahore
- Occupation: House maid

Shazia Masih (May 20, 1997 – January 22, 2010) was a young girl from Pakistan's Christian community. Near her 12th birthday, she was hired to work as a house maid in the home of the former President of the Lahore Bar Association, Chaudhry Naeem. After eight months of employment in Naeem's home, she was found dead with marks of alleged torture on her body.

Masih's case was brought into the limelight by the unusual circumstances of her death. The case initially garnered widespread media attention in Pakistan and around the world. Allegations of rape, torture and inhuman treatment were leveled against Naeem's family based on the original autopsy report. Naeem and his family were charged with murder. However, they were acquitted at trial because the original autopsy report was not presented. Instead a newer medical report was presented that said Masih died of a skin disease. In addition, the police presented confusing and conflicting statements from witnesses at trial. The verdict in the Shazia Masih case was protested by Pakistan's Christian minority.

== Background ==
Shazia Masih was born on May 20, 1997. Her parents were Akbar Masih and Nasreen Bibi. After her father died while she was young, her mother married her step-father, Bashir Masih, who was a sweeper. She lived in a rented room with her mother, step-father and five siblings in a slum in Samanabad, Lahore. Shazia Masih was the third child.

Due to abject poverty, her mother agreed for Masih to work as a maid in the home of a Lahore-based wealthy lawyer, Chaudhry Naeem. Neighbors have alleged that Chaudhry Naeem's family physically beat the 12-year-old girl for petty lapses.

== Circumstances of death ==
On Friday, 22 January 2010, Masih's step-father, Bashir, received a call from Chaudhry Naeem reporting that Masih had fallen down the stairs. She was admitted to Jinnah Hospital. Doctors at Jinnah Hospital initially told her parents and the media that Masih was dead on arrival, and that she may have died about four days earlier based on the state of the body. Staff alleged that Masih had broken her jaw, ribs and right arm, and that her body bore signs of blunt force trauma on her sensitive parts, including kidneys, neck and forehead; they also claimed signs of trauma on her genitals.

== Trial ==
Following a media outcry, the police arrested Chaudhry Naeem, his son Yasir, sister-in-law and daughter-in-law. They were initially charged by the police with illegally employing a minor, physical torture of a child and murder.

However, soon there was an outcry from members of the Lahore Bar Association (LBA), of which Naeem had earlier served as President. The LBA alleged that the police were harassing an Advocate member of the LBA. They announced a boycott of court proceedings to protest the arrest of a member of the Bar Association.

Naeem in his statement to the police alleged that Masih was misbehaving in his home. He charged her with taking food from the family's refrigerator without permission.

While the first autopsy report and statements from doctors at Jinnah Hospital alleged physical torture and abuse, a subsequent autopsy report claimed that Masih died of cardiopulmonary arrest. A toxicologist reported that Masih died of sepsis. Yet another medical report presented at trial stated that Masih died of a skin disease.

Later, the media reported that Masih's family had been paid PKR 10,000 at the time of her employment with Chaudhry Naeem's family. After Masih's death gathered media attention, her family was offered PKR 500,000 and a house by Naeem. Chaudhry Naeem alleged that Bashir Masih filed charges against him because Naeem had refused Bashir's request for money. He further alleged that Shazia Masih was mentally retarded. He claimed that he wanted Bashir to take his daughter back home, but Bashir had refused. As a result, Pakistan's Human Rights Activists distanced themselves from the case.

Masih's step-father was paid PKR 500,000 in compensation before the trial and did not testify. During trial, the prosecution did not present the original autopsy report from the Jinnah Hospital. Instead a subsequent medical report was presented which said that Shazia Masih died of a skin disease. Naeem and his family was acquitted as a result, since this report indicated that she died of natural causes.

Masih's mother and step-father separated after the trial.
