= John Jeshua Kettler =

Author

Joan Josua Ketelaar
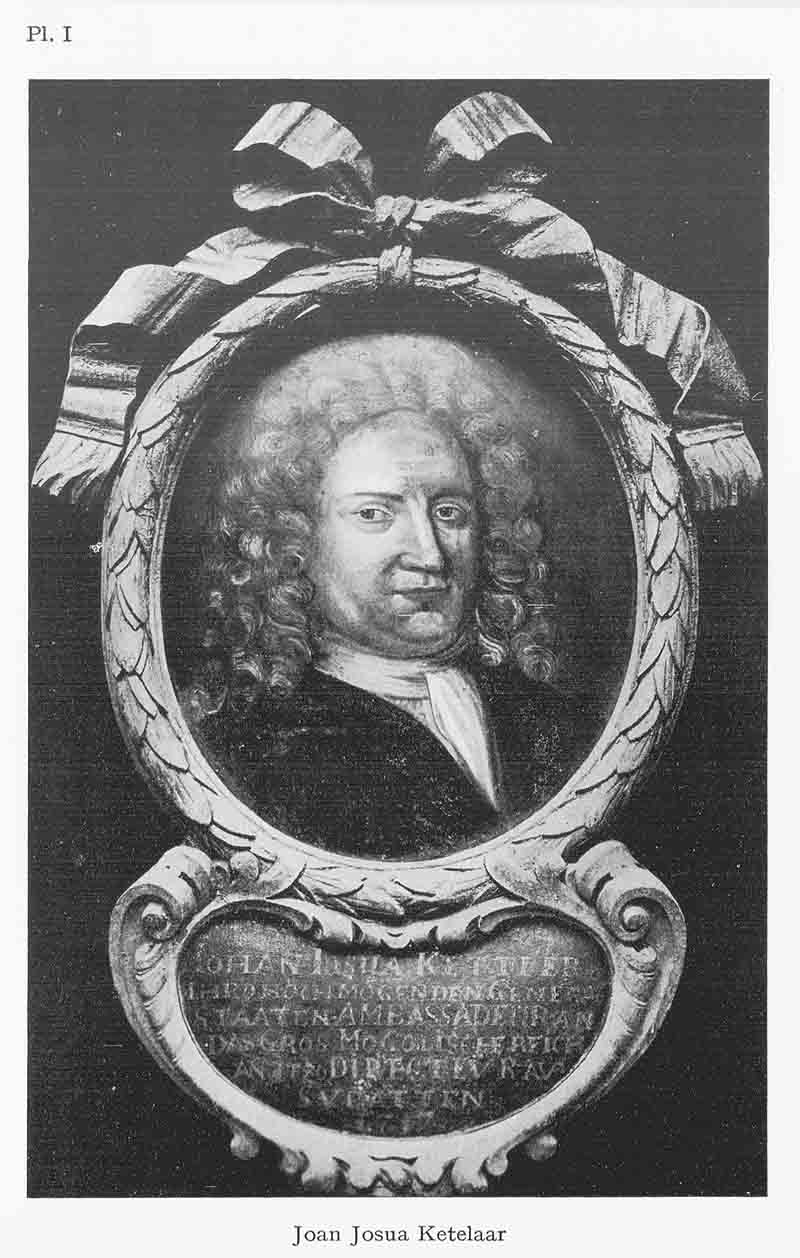
- Portrait of Johan Josua Ketelaar
- Born: Joan Josua Kettler; December 25, 1659; Elbing near Danzig (now Gdańsk) in German-speaking Poland
- Occupation: Merchant
- Years active: 1659-1718

Joan Josua Ketelaar (also written Kotelar, Kessler, or Kettler) (1659–1718), was a Dutch-speaking European born in German-speaking Poland. He came to Surat, India for business. He traveled from Surat to Delhi, Agra and Lahore. He learned Hindi and wrote a Hindustani grammar in Dutch.

== Biography ==
John was born on December 25,1659. His father was a bookbinder and he wanted John to follow him. He was a Lutheran by religion.

In 1680, Joan was accused of stealing from his master under whom he was serving his apprenticeship. And in order to save his reputation, Joan poisoned his master as well as his master's guest (though unintentionally) by mixing arsenic in the beer, however a doctor was able to save them. Due to this, Joan was forced to flee to Danzig, where he stayed with another bookbinder. However a few days later he stole the bookbinder’s money with which he fled to Stockholm.

In 1682, under the name Ketelaar, Joan registered himself with the Dutch East India Company in Amsterdam . A year later, he went to Surat via Batavia, where he made a name for himself. He rose through ranks quickly as in 1687, he was promoted to position of assistant and in 1696 to that of accountant. He then became deputy head of the trading post in Ahmedabad after which in 1700 he became head of the trading post in Agra.

At age 42, he was promoted to being a junior merchant. In 1706, Ketelaar completed a mission of purchasing coffee from Arabia successfully. He had an encounter with a French pirate from which he was able to escape while he was returning to Batavia. He was promoted to merchant as a reward. He gradually became an influential figure in Suum Cuique, a literary society where members would sometimes write odes to one another.

He was accredited to Bahadur Shah (1708-1712) and Jahandar Shah (1712) as Dutch envoy. In 1711 he became the Dutch East India Company's Director of Trade at Surat. He was then appointed as an envoy to Persia, and left Batavia in July 1716. He died of fever at Gambroon on the Persian Gulf on his return from Isfahan, after having been two days under arrest, because he would not order a Dutch ship to act under the Persian Governor's orders against some Arab invaders.

He started recording Hindustani Grammar in his "Lingua hindostanica" which is presumed to be completed in 1715 and he was the first one to do so. He had probably penned the grammar during his stay in Agra or Lucknow between 1696 and 1697. This Dutch manuscript was copied by Isaac Van Der Hoeve in 1698. It was partially translated into Latin by David Mill. His work was published by David Mills in 1743. The Latin version of this book was published in 1743 in Leiden, Holland. The complete work was never published and until 1935, it was considered to have been lost. Experts found out rather than being Hindi grammar, it was dominantly Urdu grammar. His notes have been preserved in three manuscripts. Utrecht University Library house the most complete manuscripts. A copy is available in the National Library of India.
