= Masih Zahedi =

Iranian footballer

Personal information
- Full name: Masih Zahedi
- Date of birth: January 12, 1993 (age 33)
- Place of birth: Karaj, Iran
- Position: Defender

Team information
- Current team: Gol Gohar
- Number: 26

Youth career
- 2010–2013: Paykan
- 2013–2014: Shahrdari Ardabil

Senior career*
Years	Team	Apps	(Gls)
2014–2015	Saipa	7	(0)
2015–2016	Shahrdari Ardabil	2	(0)
2016–2017	Oxin Alborz	27	(2)
2017–2018	Gostaresh Foulad	26	(2)
2018–2020	Machine Sazi	41	(0)
2020–2021	Mes Rafsanjan	25	(1)
2021–	Gol Gohar	91	(3)
- * Club domestic league appearances and goals as of 4 September 2026

Masih Zahedi (Persian: مسیح زاهدی); is an Iranian footballer who plays for Iranian club Gol Gohar as a defender.

== Club career ==
=== Paykan ===
He started his career with Paykan from youth levels.

=== Shahrdari Ardabil ===
Zahedi joined Shahrdari Ardabil in summer 2013, and helped them gain promotion to the 2014–15 Azadegan League.

=== Saipa ===
Zahedi joined Saipa in summer 2014. He made his debut for Saipa on 4 December 2014 against Naft MIS as a starter.

== Club career statistics ==
As of 15 May 2015.

Club	Division	Season	League		Hazfi Cup		Asia		Total	
Club	Division	Season	Apps	Goals	Apps	Goals	Apps	Goals	Apps	Goals
Paykan	Persian Gulf Pro League	2010-11	1	0	0	0	-	-	1	0
Saipa	Pro League	2014–15	7	0	1	0	–	–	8	0
Shahrdari Ardabil	Azadegan League	2015-16	2	0	0	0	-	-	2	0
Gol Reyhan	Azadegan League	2016-17	27	2	1	0	-	-	28	2
Gostaresh Foulad	Persian Gulf Pro League	2017-18	26	2	3	0	-	-	29	2
Machine Sazi	Persian Gulf Pro League	2018-19	20	0	2	1	-	-	22	1
Machine Sazi	Persian Gulf Pro League	2019-20	21	0	0	0	-	-	21	0
Machine Sazi	Total		41	0	2	1	0	0	43	1
Mes Rafsanjan	Persian Gulf Pro League	2020-21	25	1	1	0	-	-	26	1
Gol Gohar	Persian Gulf Pro League	2021-22	17	0	1	0	-	-	18	0
Gol Gohar	Persian Gulf Pro League	2022-23	20	0	1	1	-	-	21	1
Gol Gohar	Persian Gulf Pro League	2023-24	24	2	3	0	-	-	27	2
Gol Gohar	Total		61	2	5	1	0	0	66	3
Career Totals			190	7	13	2	0	0	203	9
