= Masihullah Barakzai =

Afghan footballer (born 1990)

Personal information
- Full name: Masihullah Barakzai
- Date of birth: December 6, 1990 (age 35)
- Place of birth: Kabul, Afghanistan
- Height: 1.80 m (5 ft 11 in)
- Positions: Defensive midfielder; attacking midfielder; winger

Team information
- Current team: Afghan Premier F.C
- Number: 6

Youth career
- 2002,2005: Pamir F.C, Hadaf F.C

Senior career*
Years	Team	Apps	(Gls)
2009,2014	Seramiasht F.C., Afghan Premier F.C	75	(20)

International career
2010–present	Afghanistan	7	(0)
- * Club domestic league appearances and goals

Masihullah Barakzai (born December 6, 1990) is an Afghan footballer who currently plays for Afghan Premier F.C from U.S. He also played for Saremyesht F.C at Kabul Premier League Afghanistan from 2009 to 2012. He played for U-21 national team as a defensive midfielder for South Asian Games at Bangladesh in 2010 with five official caps against India, Sri Lanka, Pakistan, Maldives and Bangladesh and then selected for senior Afghanistan national football team. He has 7 official caps, against Tajikistan, Bhutan and Nepal, Palestine, India and one unofficial, as the national team played against Tajikistan U-23 team in a second match. He wears number 11 and his main positions on the field is defensive/offensive midfielder, right and left winger.
