= Bir Masih Saunta =

Indian politician

District. General Secretary of Punjab Pardesh Congress Commettie PPCC (India)
- Incumbent
- Assumed office 22 November 2015
- Constituency: Dera Baba Nanak (Lok Sabha constituency)gurdaspur

General Secretary of Punjab Pradesh Congress Committee(Minority Department)
- In office 22 November 2015 – present

Personal details
- Born: 7 March 1969 (age 57) adalatpur, Punjab
- Party: Indian National Congress (AICC)
- Spouse: Mrs. Marian Saunta

Bir Masih Saunta (born 7 March 1969) is an Indian politician of the Indian National Congress (AICC). He is a former General Secretary of district Congress committee of Punjab. He was appointed as General Secretary Of Minority Department on 22 November 2015 by Ahmed Kha.
