= Akram Masih Gill =

Pakistani politician

Member of the National Assembly of Pakistan
- In office 2008–2013

Akram Masih Gill is a Pakistani Christian politician who served as member of the National Assembly of Pakistan.

== Political career ==
He was elected to the National Assembly of Pakistan on a seat reserved for minorities as a candidate of Pakistan Muslim League (Q) in the 2008 Pakistani general election.

In 2011, he was inducted into the federal cabinet of Prime Minister Yusuf Raza Gillani and was made Minister of State for National Harmony.
