= Michael Masih =

Pakistani footballer

Personal information
- Full name: Michael Masih
- Date of birth: 7 June 1985 (age 41)
- Place of birth: Bhimber, Azad Kashmir, Pakistan
- Position: Midfielder

Senior career*
Years	Team	Apps	(Gls)
2003–2011	Pakistan Army	?	(?)

International career
2008	Pakistan	5	(1)
- * Club domestic league appearances and goals

Michael Masih (born 7 June 1985) is a Pakistani former footballer who played as a midfielder.

== Club career ==
Masih played for Pakistan Army throughout his career from 2003 until 2011, winning the 2005–06 and 2006–07 Pakistan Premier League title. He also participated in the AFC President's Cup with the club.

== International career ==
Masih earned his first international cap against Nepal in a friendly in 2008. His scored his first goal against Chinese Taipei in the 2008 AFC Challenge Cup. He remained an unused substitute in a friendly later in October 2008 against Malaysia.

== Personal life ==
Masih hails from Bhimber in Azad Kashmir, Pakistan. He is one of the Christian footballers to play for Pakistan.

== Career statistics ==
=== International ===
Appearances and goals by national team and year
National team	Year	Apps	Goals
Pakistan	2008	5	1
Total		5	1

Scores and results list Pakistan's goal tally first, score column indicates score after each Masih goal.

List of international goals scored by Michael Masih
No.	Date	Venue	Opponent	Score	Result	Competition
1	2 April 2008	Taipei, Taiwan	Chinese Taipei	2–1	2–1	2008 AFC Challenge Cup qualification

== Honours ==
With Pakistan Army FC

- Pakistan Premier League: 2005–06, 2006–07
