= Naeem Masih =

Pakistani para-athlete (born 1987)

Naeem Masih (born 2 February 1987) is a Pakistani para-athlete. He represented Pakistan at the 2012 Summer Paralympics.

Masih was selected to run in the men's 1500m - T46 event at the 2012 London Paralympic Games. He came last in Heat 2 with a season's best time of 4:51.35.
