= 2014–15 Esteghlal F.C. season =

Esteghlal F.C.
2014–15 season
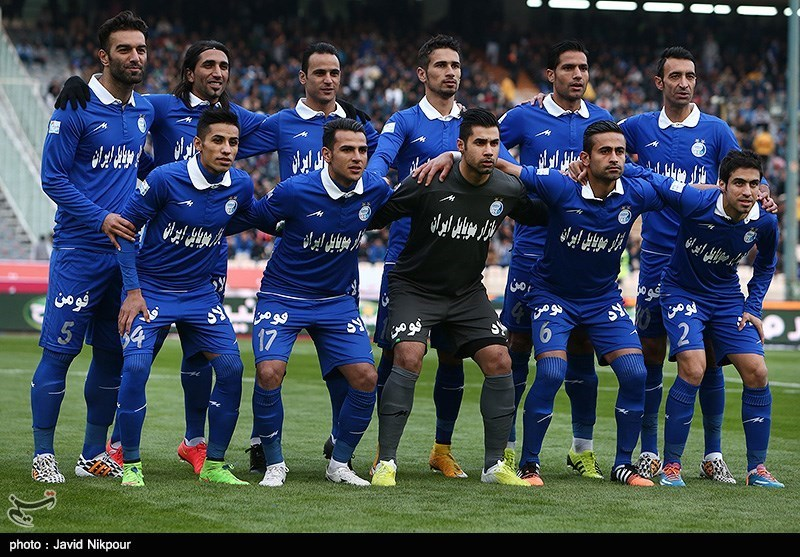
- President: Bahram Afsharzadeh
- Head coach: Amir Ghalenoei
- Stadium: Azadi Stadium
- Persian Gulf Pro League: 6th
- Hazfi Cup: Quarter-Final
- Top goalscorer: League: Shahbazzadeh (12); All: Shahbazzadeh (13)
- Highest home attendance: 67,000 v Persepolis (23 November 2014)
- Lowest home attendance: 2,000 v Rah Ahan (1 December 2014)
- Average home league attendance: 16,400
Home colours	Away colours	Third colours

The 2014–15 season are the Esteghlal Football Club's 14th season in the Persian Gulf Pro League, and their 21st consecutive season in the top division of Iranian football. They are also competing in the Hazfi Cup and 70th year in existence as a football club.

== Club ==
=== Coaching staff ===
Position	Staff
Head coach	Amir Ghalenoei
Assistant coach	Javad Zarrincheh
Assistant coach	Mahmoud Fekri
Assistant coach	Sattar Hamedani
Goalkeepers coach	Karim Boostani
Fitness trainer	Parviz Heydari
Fitness advisor	Parviz Komasi
Analyzers	Iman Alami
Analyzers	Nima Rasouli
Physiotherapists	Amin Norouzi
Doctor	Kaveh Sotoudeh
Psychologist	Abbas Montazeri
Munition Team	Madad Jabbari
Munition Team	Hossein Amanati

=== Other information ===
Chairman	Bahram Afsharzadeh
Deputy Chairman	Ali Nazari Juybari
Media Officer	Mohammad Nourifar
Director of Football	Mirshad Majedi
Ground (capacity and dimensions)	Azadi Stadium (100,000 / 110x75m)
Training ground	Nasser Hejazi Camp

== First team squad ==
Last updated: 14 June 2015

No.	Name	Nationality	Position(s)	Since	Date of Birth (Age)	Signed from	Ends	Games	Goals
Goalkeepers
1	Mohsen Forouzan	(Iran)	GK	2014	3 May 1988 (aged 26)	(Iran) Gostaresh Foulad	2017	0	0
21	Farzin Garousian	(Iran)	GK	2014	19 July 1992 (aged 22)	(Iran) Mes Soongoun	2017	0	0
22	Vahid Talebloo	(Iran)	GK	2014	26 May 1982 (aged 32)	(Iran) Rah Ahan	2017	191	0
Defenders
2	Khosro Heydari	(Iran)	RM, RB	2011	14 September 1983 (aged 31)	(Iran) Sepahan	2015	208	7
4	Amir Hossein Sadeghi	(Iran)	CB, SW	2012	6 September 1981 (aged 33)	(Iran) Tractor Sazi	2016	296	17
5	Hanif Omranzadeh	(Iran)	CB, SW	2009	30 April 1985 (aged 29)	(Iran) Pas	2016	191	23
15	Hrayr Mkoyan	(Armenia)	CB, SW	2014	2 September 1986 (aged 28)	(Armenia) FC Shirak	2016	24	0
16	Hashem Beikzadeh	(Iran)	LB, LM	2012	22 January 1984 (aged 30)	(Iran) Sepahan	2016	127	4
20	Majid Hosseini	(Iran)	CB, RB	2014	20 June 1996 (aged 18)	Youth system	2017	4	0
34	Milad Fakhreddini	(Iran)	RB, RW	2014	26 May 1990 (aged 24)	(Iran) Tractor Sazi	2016	28	1
Midfielders
3	Mohammad Reza Khorsandnia	(Iran)	DM, CB	2014	5 February 1988 (aged 26)	(Iran) Padideh	2017	27	0
6	Omid Ebrahimi	(Iran)	DM, CM	2014	16 September 1987 (aged 27)	(Iran) Sepahan	2015	31	9
13	Karrar Jassim	(Iraq)	AM, LM, RM, SS	2014	11 June 1987 (aged 27)	(Iraq) Al-Talaba	2016	35	6
17	Yaghoub Karimi	(Iran)	LM, RM	2014	31 August 1991 (aged 23)	(Iran) Sepahan	2015	24	1
28	Mohsen Karimi	(Iran)	LM, RM, LW, RW	2014	20 September 1994 (aged 20)	Youth system	2017	4	0
99	Milad Nouri	(Iran)	CM, AM	2014	3 May 1986 (aged 28)	(Iran) Paykan	2015	13	3
Forwards
9	Arash Borhani	(Iran)	CF, RW, LW	2007	14 September 1983 (aged 31)	(Iran) PAS Tehran	2016	276	106
10	Sajjad Shahbazzadeh	(Iran)	CF, ST	2014	23 January 1990 (aged 24)	(Iran) Saipa	2017	32	13
29	Milad Soleiman Fallah	(Iran)	CF, ST	2014	15 September 1986 (aged 28)	(Iran) Naft Masjed Soleyman	2017	4	0
44	Behnam Barzay	(Iran)	RW, LW, RM, LM	2015	11 February 1993 (aged 21)	(Iran) Rah Ahan	2017	3	0
80	Reza Enayati	(Iran)	CF, ST	2014	23 September 1976 (aged 38)	(Iran) Padideh	2016	107	63
Players transferred during the season
32	Amir Hossein Tahuni	(Iran)	LM, LW	2014	22 October 1992 (aged 22)	(Iran) Damash Iranian	2019	6	0
11	Mohammad Ghazi	(Iran)	CF, LW, ST	2013	30 December 1984 (aged 30)	(Iran) Persepolis	2016	55	16
23	Mehdi Karimian	(Iran)	CM, AM	2014	28 August 1980 (aged 34)	(Iran) Tractor Sazi	2016	11	1
19	Alireza Ramezani	(Iran)	RM, LM, RW, LW	2014	3 June 1993 (aged 21)	(Iran) Naft Gachsaran	2017	11	1
14	Andranik Teymourian	(Iran)	DM, CM	2013	6 March 1983 (aged 31)	(Qatar) Al-Kharitiyath	2016	73	3
8	Pejman Nouri	(Iran)	DM, CM, LM	2013	13 July 1980 (aged 34)	(Iran) Malavan	2015	56	0
12	Alberto Rafael da Silva	(Brazil)	GK	2014	24 March 1984 (aged 30)	(Brazil) Fluminense	2015	0	0

=== Iran Pro League squad ===
Note: Flags indicate national team as defined under FIFA eligibility rules; some limited exceptions apply. Players may hold more than one non-FIFA nationality.

No.	Pos.	Nation	Player
1	GK	IRI	Mohsen Forouzan
2	DF	IRI	Khosro Heidari
3	MF	IRI	Mohammad Reza Khorsandnia
4	DF	IRI	Amir Hossein Sadeghi (c)
5	DF	IRI	Hanif Omranzadeh
6	MF	IRI	Omid Ebrahimi
9	FW	IRI	Arash Borhani
10	FW	IRI	Sajjad Shahbazzadeh
13	MF	IRQ	Karrar Jassim
15	DF	ARM	Hrayr Mkoyan
16	DF	IRI	Hashem Beikzadeh
17	MF	IRI	Yaghoub Karimi (on loan from Sepahan)
18	DF	IRI	Soheil Asgharzadeh^{U23}
19	MF	IRI	Alireza Ramezani^{U21}
20	DF	IRI	Majid Hosseini^{U21}

No.	Pos.	Nation	Player
21	GK	IRI	Farzin Garousian^{U23}
22	GK	IRI	Vahid Talebloo
24	MF	IRI	Omid Noorafkan^{U21}
25	DF	IRI	Mohammad Khalili^{U23}
26	DF	IRI	Iman Abaszadeh^{U21}
27	DF	IRI	Mohammad Reza Soleimani^{U21}
28	MF	IRI	Mohsen Karimi^{U21}
29	FW	IRI	Milad Soleiman Fallah
34	DF	IRI	Milad Fakhreddini
35	DF	IRI	Mehdi Karbalaei^{U23}
44	FW	IRI	Behnam Barzay^{U23}
77	MF	GER	Hendrik Helmke
80	FW	IRI	Reza Enayati
99	MF	IRI	Milad Nouri

- U21 = Under 21 Player
- U23 = Under 23 Player

== New contracts ==
No.	Pos	Name	Age	Contract length	Ends	Date	Source
5	CB	(Iran) Hanif Omranzadeh	29	2 year	2016	30 June 2014	
8	CM	(Iran) Pejman Nouri	34	1 year	2015	30 June 2014	
9	CF	(Iran) Arash Borhani	30	2 year	2016	30 June 2014	
11	LW	(Iran) Mohammad Ghazi	29	2 year	2016	30 June 2014	
16	LB	(Iran) Hashem Beikzadeh	30	2 year	2016	8 July 2014	
4	CB	(Iran) Amir Hossein Sadeghi	32	2 year	2016	13 July 2014	
2	RB	(Iran) Khosro Heydari	30	1 year	2015	13 July 2014	
14	DM	(Iran) Andranik Teymourian	31	2 year	2016	17 July 2014	

== Transfers ==
=== In ===
==== Summer ====
No.	Pos	Nat.	Name	Age	Moving From	Type	Ends	Date	Source
21	GK	(Iran)	Farzin Garousian	21	Mes Soongoun	Transfer	2017	10 June 2014	
3	DM	(Iran)	Mohammad Reza Khorsandnia	26	Padideh	Transfer	2017	10 June 2014	
6	DM	(Iran)	Omid Ebrahimi	26	Sepahan	Free transfer	2015	10 June 2014	
10	ST	(Iran)	Sajjad Shahbazzadeh	24	Saipa	Transfer	2017	10 June 2014	
34	RB	(Iran)	Milad Fakhreddini	24	Tractor Sazi	Transfer	2016	10 June 2014	
15	CB	(Armenia)	Hrayr Mkoyan	27	(Armenia) FC Shirak	Transfer	2016	16 June 2014	
27	MF	(Iran)	Mohammad Reza Soleimani	18	PAS Hamedan	Transfer	2017	21 June 2014	
23	CM	(Iran)	Mehdi Karimian	33	Tractor Sazi	Transfer	2016	25 June 2014	
18	MF	(Iran)	Soheil Asgharzadeh	21	Malavan	Free Transfer	2017	28 June 2014	
1	GK	(Iran)	Mohsen Forouzan	26	Tractor Sazi	Free transfer	2017	29 June 2014	
19	RM	(Iran)	Alireza Ramezani	21	Naft Gachsaran	Free Transfer	2017	29 June 2014	
13	AM	(Iraq)	Karrar Jassim	27	(Iraq) Al-Talaba	Transfer	2016	4 July 2014	
12	GK	(Brazil)	Alberto Rafael da Silva	30	(Brazil) Fluminense	Transfer	2015	7 July 2014	
26	FW	(Iran)	Iman Abaszadeh	18	Nassaji Mazandaran	Transfer	2017	22 July 2014	
32	LM	(Iran)	Amir Hossein Tahuni	21	Damash Iranian	Transfer	2019	23 July 2014	
35	DF	(Iran)	Mehdi Karbalaei	21	Naft Tehran	Transfer	2017	23 July 2014	
40	GK	(Iran)	Abbas Bakhtiari	20	Moghavemat Tehran	Transfer	2017	July 2014	

==== Winter ====
No.	Pos	Nat.	Name	Age	Moving From	Type	Ends	Date	Source
20	CB	(Iran)	Majid Hosseini	18	Saipa	Transfer	2017	24 November 2014	
29	ST	(Iran)	Milad Soleiman Fallah	28	Naft Masjed Soleyman	Free Transfer	2017	1 December 2014	
22	GK	(Iran)	Vahid Talebloo	32	Rah Ahan	Free Transfer	2017	21 December 2014	
99	CM	(Iran)	Milad Nouri	28	Paykan	Transfer	2015	22 December 2014	
80	ST	(Iran)	Reza Enayati	38	Padideh	Free Transfer	2016	26 December 2014	
77	CM	(Germany)	Hendrik Helmke	27	(Finland) FF Jaro	Free Transfer	2015	27 December 2014	
44	RW	(Iran)	Behnam Barzay	21	Rah Ahan	Free Transfer	2017	7 February 2015	

=== Out ===
==== Summer ====
No.	Pos	Nat.	Name	Age	Moving To	Type	Date	Source
19	ST	(France)	Boubacar Kébé	27	(Sudan) Al-Hilal	Transfer	27 April 2014	
32	CF	(Iran)	Mehdi Nazari	24	Gostaresh Foolad	End of contract	29 May 2014	
27	AM	(Brazil)	Tony	28	(Brazil) Boavista	End of Loan	15 June 2014	
22	LM	(Iran)	Alireza Vahedi Nikbakht	34	Khoneh Be Khoneh	End of contract	15 June 2014	
70	RB	(Iran)	Majid Gholamnejad	31	Unattached	Transfer	15 June 2014	
1	GK	(Iran)	Mehdi Rahmati	31	Paykan	End of contract	18 June 2014	
3	DM	(Trinidad and Tobago)	Jlloyd Samuel	33	Paykan	End of contract	23 June 2014	
23	AM	(Iran)	Iman Mobali	31	Naft Tehran	End of contract	23 June 2014	
77	CF	(Iran)	Mehrdad Oladi	29	Malavan	Transfer	6 July 2014	
10	CF	(Iran)	Siavash Akbarpour	29	Paykan	Transfer	12 July 2014	
20	AM	(Iran)	Ahmad Jamshidian	30	Paykan	Transfer	21 July 2014	
13	GK	(Iran)	Mehrdad Hosseini	25	Retired	Transfer	July 2014	
12	DF	(Iran)	Meysam Joudaki	19	Naft Tehran	Transfer	July 2014	
30	AM	(Iran)	Arash Rezavand	20	Naft Tehran	Transfer	July 2014	
—	GK	(Iran)	Taha Zareei	19	(Portugal) Naval	Transfer	August 2014	

==== Winter ====
No.	Pos	Nat.	Name	Age	Moving To	Type	Date	Source
23	CM	(Iran)	Mehdi Karimian	34	Fajr Sepasi	Released	22 November 2014	
8	CM	(Iran)	Pejman Nouri	34	Malavan	Released	28 November 2014	
30	MF	(Iran)	Saeid Amraei	22	Retired	Released	November 2014	
12	GK	(Brazil)	Alberto Rafael da Silva	30	(Brazil) Cabofriense	Released	16 December 2014	
14	DM	(Iran)	Andranik Teymourian	31	Tractor Sazi	Released	24 December 2014	
11	ST	(Iran)	Mohammad Ghazi	30	Foolad	Released	30 December 2014	
77	CM	(Germany)	Hendrik Helmke	27	(Egypt) Al Ahly	Released	30 January 2015	
40	GK	(Iran)	Abbas Bakhtiari	21	Nassaji	Transfer	January 2015	

=== Loan in ===
==== Summer ====
No.	Pos	Nat.	Name	Age	Loaned From	Start	Ends	Source
17	LM	(Iran)	Yaghoub Karimi	22	Sepahan	21 July 2014	30 June 2015	

=== Loan out ===
==== Summer ====
No.	Pos	Nat.	Name	Age	Loaned To	Start	Ends	Source
34	RM	(Iran)	Iman Basafa	22	Esteghlal Khuzestan	June 2014	30 June 2015	
21	GK	(Iran)	Hossein Hosseini	21	Malavan	17 June 2014	30 June 2016	

==== Winter ====
No.	Pos	Nat.	Name	Age	Loaned To	Start	Ends	Source
32	LM	(Iran)	Amir Hossein Tahuni	22	Nassaji	3 January 2015	30 June 2015	

== Competitions ==
=== Overall ===
Competition	Started round	Current position / round	Final position / round	First match	Last match
Iran Pro League	—	6th	6th	1 August 2014	15 May 2015
Hazfi Cup	Round of 32	Quarter-Final	Quarter-Final	18 October 2014	27 November 2014

Updated to match played 15 May 2015
Source: Competitions
Note: Current Position/Round Only use for team still a part of Competition.

=== Competition record ===
Competition	Record							
Competition	G	W	D	L	GF	GA	GD	Win %
Iran Pro League	30	13	8	9	40	34	+6	43.33
Hazfi Cup	3	2	1	0	7	4	+3	66.67
Total	33	15	9	9	47	38	+9	45.45

=== Persian Gulf Pro League ===
==== Standings ====
Pos	Team	Pld	W	D	L	GF	GA	GD	Pts	Qualification or relegation
4	Zob Ahan	30	14	10	6	46	26	+20	52	Qualification for the 2016 AFC Champions League Group stage (Note: Zob Ahan secured qualification for the 2016 AFC Champions League through winning the 2014–15 Hazfi Cup.)
5	Foolad	30	15	7	8	33	24	+9	52	
6	Esteghlal	30	13	8	9	40	34	+6	47	
7	Saipa	30	11	8	11	36	34	+2	41	
8	Persepolis	30	9	9	12	31	35	−4	36	

Updated to match(es) played on 15 May 2015. Source: FIFA.com
Rules for classification: 1) points; 2) goal difference; 3) number of goals scored.

==== Results summary ====
Overall								Home						Away					
Pld	W	D	L	GF	GA	GD	Pts	W	D	L	GF	GA	GD	W	D	L	GF	GA	GD
30	13	8	9	40	34	+6	47	8	3	4	19	14	+5	5	5	5	21	20	+1

Last updated: 15 May 2015.
Source: Ipl Stats

==== Results by round ====
Round	1	2	3	4	5	6	7	8	9	10	11	12	13	14	15	16	17	18	19	20	21	22	23	24	25	26	27	28	29	30
Ground	A	H	A	H	A	H	A	A	H	A	H	A	H	A	H	H	A	H	A	H	A	H	H	A	H	A	H	A	H	A
Result	W	W	L	W	W	W	W	L	L	L	W	D	D	D	L	W	D	W	W	W	D	W	L	L	D	D	D	W	L	L
Position	2	2	4	3	1	1	1	2	2	2	2	2	3	4	6	5	5	5	2	1	2	2	3	3	5	5	6	6	6	6

Updated to match(es) played on 15 May 2015. Source: "Ipl".
A = Away; H = Home; W = Win; D = Draw; L = Loss

==== Matches ====
Win Draw Loss Postponed

1 August 2014 1	Rah Ahan	1–2	Esteghlal	Tehran
IRDT (UTC+04:30)	Rezaïan 2'; Irannejad (yellow card) 37'; Karimi (yellow card) 52'		K. Jassim 55'; Ghazi 74'; Khorsandnia (yellow card) 83'	Stadium: Takhti Tehran; Attendance: 8,000; Referee: Hossein Zargar; Man of the Match: Khosro Heydari

8 August 2014 2	Esteghlal	1–0	Esteghlal Khuzestan	Tehran
20:00 IRDT (UTC+04:30)	Teymourian (yellow card); Shahbazzadeh 90+2'	Summary	Hadi Khanifar (yellow card); Coulibaly (yellow card)	Stadium: Azadi Stadium; Attendance: 12,000

14 August 2014 3	Sepahan	3–1	Esteghlal	Isfahan
19:15 IRDT (UTC+04:30)	Hajsafi 27'; Sharifi 32'; Aghili (yellow card) 44'; Pereira 64'; Khalilzadeh (yellow card) 67'; Khalatbari (yellow card) 69'; Khalilzadeh (yellow card) 90' (red card)		Fakhreddini 16'	Stadium: Fooladshahr Stadium; Attendance: 13,000

19 August 2014 4	Esteghlal	3–2	Saipa	Tehran
IRDT (UTC+04:30)	K. Jassim 32'; Ebrahimi 64'; Fakhreddini (yellow card) 70'; Ebrahimi 91'		Shakouri 6'; Shiri 49'; Shakouri (yellow card) 78'; M. Ramezani (yellow card) 78'	Stadium: Azadi Stadium; Attendance: 9,000; Referee: Yadollah Jahanbazi

24 August 2014 5	Paykan	0–3	Esteghlal	Tehran
IRDT (UTC+04:30)	Nosrati (yellow card) 66'; Divsalar (yellow card) 79'		Heydari 30'; Beikzadeh (yellow card) 41'; ~~Karimian~~ 53'; Shahbazzadeh 61'	Stadium: Takhti Tehran; Attendance: 10,000; Referee: Ahmad Salehi

29 August 2014 6	Esteghlal	3–0	Gostaresh	Tehran
IRDT (UTC+04:30)	Borhani (yellow card) 27'; Borhani 39' (pen.); Ebrahimi 45'; Teymourian (yellow card) 59'; K. Jassim (yellow card) 76'; Ghazi 89'		Asadi (yellow card) 74'; Naghizadeh (yellow card)	Stadium: Azadi Stadium; Attendance: 15,000; Referee: Mohammad Reza Akbarian

4 September 2014 7	Naft Masjed Soleyman	0–2	Esteghlal	Masjed Soleyman
IRDT (UTC+04:30)	Mahmoud Tighnavard (yellow card) 22'; Kiamars Cheraghi (yellow card) 23'		Fakhreddini (yellow card) 25'; Ghazi 42'; Shahbazzadeh 90'	Stadium: Behnam Mohammadi Stadium; Attendance: 6,500; Referee: Hajbabaei

9 September 2014 8	Naft Tehran	2–0	Esteghlal	Tehran
IRDT (UTC+04:30)	Amiri 1'; Amiri (yellow card) 76'; Motahari 88'			Stadium: Takhti Stadium; Attendance: 12,000; Referee: Mehdi Seyed Ali

18 September 2014 9	Esteghlal	0–1	Foolad	Tehran
	Ghazi (yellow card)		Rafiei 84'	Stadium: Azadi Stadium; Attendance: 17,000

26 September 2014 10	Zob Ahan	2–1	Esteghlal	Isfahan
19:00	Rajabzadeh (yellow card) 7' (yellow-red card) 80' (goal) 9'; Imani (yellow card); Seifpanahi (yellow card); Hassanzadeh 73'; Farhadi (yellow card)	Summary	Sadeghi (yellow card); Beikzadeh 50'	Stadium: Foolad Shahr Stadium; Attendance: 7,500; Referee: (Iran) Yadollah Jahanbazi

2 October 2014 11	Esteghlal	3–1	Malavan	Tehran
19:00	Ebrahimi 34'; Ghazi 41'; Shahbazzadeh 84'		Rafkhaei 56'	Stadium: Azadi Stadium; Attendance: 10,000

22 October 2014 12	Padideh	1–1	Esteghlal	Mashhad
15:00	Jovanović (yellow card) 24'; Nasehi (yellow card) 36'; Kheiri 52'; Nazarzadeh (yellow card) 76'; Prahić (yellow card) 81'	Varzesh 3	Shahbazzadeh 3'; Khorsandnia (yellow card) 15'; Sadeghi (yellow card) 47'	Stadium: Samen Stadium; Attendance: 35,000; Referee: MohammadReza Akbarian

30 October 2014 13	Esteghlal	1–1	Saba Qom	Tehran
16:35 IRDT (UTC+04:30)	Milad Fakhreddini (yellow card) 17' (substituted off) 58'; Andranik Teymourian (substituted on) 45'; Mohammad Reza Khorsandnia (substituted off) 45'; Alireza Ramezani (substituted on) 58' (substituted off) 68'; Pezhman Noori (substituted on) 68'; Sajjad Shahbazzadeh 72'	varzesh3	Ayoub Kalantari 77'	Stadium: Azadi Stadium; Attendance: 18,000; Referee: Turaj Haghverdi

7 November 2014 14	Tractor Sazi	2–2	Esteghlal	Tabriz
16:30 IRDT (UTC+04:30)	Khaled Shafiei (yellow card) 42'; Shahin Saghebi 75'; Édinho 86'	varzesh3	Karrar Jassim (yellow card) 57'; Arash Borhani 62'; Amir Hossein Sadeghi 90+5'	Stadium: Sahand; Attendance: 65,000; Referee: Alireza Faghani

23 November 2014 15	Esteghlal	1–2	Persepolis	Tehran
18:05 DST+03:30	S. Shahbazzaadeh 44'; A. Teymourian (yellow card) 63'; M. Fakhreddini (yellow card) 78'	Summary; Stats; Live TV: IRIB TV3 / Jame Jam 2	M. Bengar (yellow card) 54'; M. Nouri 74' (yellow card) 74'; O. Alishah 82' (yellow card) 78' (yellow-red card) 82'; Nilson C. (yellow card) 90'; M. Taremi (yellow card) 90+6'	Stadium: Azadi Stadium; Attendance: 67,000; Referee: Yadollah Jahanbazi

1 December 2014 16	Esteghlal	1–0	Rah Ahan	Tehran
18:00 DST+03:30	S. Shahbazzaadeh 62'	varzesh3	M.Gholami (yellow card) 33'; V.Talebloo (yellow card) 45'; B.Abdi (yellow card) 90'	Stadium: Azadi Stadium; Attendance: 2,000; Referee: Mohsen Torky

11 December 2014 17	Esteghlal Khuzestan	4–4	Esteghlal	Ahvaz
16:20 DST+03:30	Seyed-Salehi 6', 43'; Momeni 38' (pen.) (yellow card) 46'; Tayyebi 74'	Varzesh3	Karimi 4'; Ebrahimi 30', 51' (pen.); Karrar (yellow card) 45'; Shahbazzaadeh 62'	Stadium: Ghadir Stadium; Attendance: 6,000; Referee: Tooraj Haghverdi; Man of the Match: Seyed-Salehi

30 January 2015 18	Esteghlal	2–1	Sepahan	Tehran
16:55 DST+03:30	Enayati 8'; Ebrahimi 90+2'	varzesh3	Papi 42'	Stadium: Azadi Stadium; Attendance: 10,000; Referee: Yadollah Jahanbazi

4 February 2015 19	Saipa	0–1	Esteghlal	Karaj
15:30 DST+03:30	Sadeghi (yellow card) 73'	varzesh3	Shahbazzadeh 45'; Jassim (yellow card) 84' (yellow-red card)	Stadium: Enghelab Stadium; Attendance: 6,500; Referee: Alireza Faghani

8 February 2015 20	Esteghlal	1–0	Paykan	Tehran
17:10 DST+03:30	Yazdani (yellow card) 13'; Akbarpour (yellow card) 19'	varzesh3	Borhani (yellow card) 9'; Shahbazzadeh 90+3'	Stadium: Azadi Stadium; Attendance: 6,000; Referee: Tooraj Haghverdi

20 February 2015 21	Gostaresh	0–0	Esteghlal	Tabriz
15:30 DST+03:30				Stadium: Gostaresh Foulad Stadium; Attendance: 3,500

6 March 2015 22	Esteghlal	1–0	Naft Masjed Soleyman	Tehran
17:30 DST+03:30	Enayati 61'			Stadium: Azadi Stadium; Attendance: 5,000

12 March 2015 23	Esteghlal	0–1	Naft Tehran	Tehran
18:15 DST+03:30			Padovani 81'	Stadium: Azadi Stadium; Attendance: 17,000

2 April 2015 24	Foolad	2–1	Esteghlal	Ahvaz
18:55 DST+03:30	Sharifat 76'; Chago 81'		Enayati 13'	Stadium: Ghadir Stadium; Attendance: 14,000

10 April 2015 25	Esteghlal	1–1	Zob Ahan	Tehran
19:00 DST+03:30	Ebrahimi 63'		Esmaeilifar 75'	Stadium: Azadi Stadium; Attendance: 12,000

17 April 2015 26	Malavan	1–1	Esteghlal	Bandar-e Anzali
17:30 DST+03:30	Kanaani 47'		Enayati 16'	Stadium: Takhti Stadium; Attendance: 8,500

26 April 2015 27	Esteghlal	0–0	Padideh	Tehran
19:15 DST+03:30				Stadium: Azadi Stadium; Attendance: 11,000

30 April 2015 28	Saba Qom	1–2	Esteghlal	Qom
	Badamaki 77'		K. Jassim 8'; Shahbazzadeh 58'	Stadium: Yadegar-e Emam Stadium; Attendance: 6,000

10 May 2015 29	Esteghlal	1–4	Tractor Sazi	Tehran
	Ebrahimi 30'		S. Nariman Jahan 8'; Edinho 45'; S. Nariman Jahan 56'; S. Nariman Jahan 87'	Stadium: Azadi Stadium; Attendance: 35,000

15 May 2015 30	Persepolis	1–0	Esteghlal	Tehran
17:00 DST+03:30	A. Alipour 65'	Stats; Summary; Live TV: IRIB TV3 / Jame Jam 2		Stadium: Azadi Stadium; Attendance: 70,000; Referee: Touraj Haghverdi

=== Hazfi Cup ===
Win Draw Loss Postponed

18 October 2014 Round of 32	Foolad Novin	0–1 (a.e.t.)	Esteghlal	Ahvaz
19:00 DST+03:30			Ramezani 109'	Stadium: Ghadir Stadium; Attendance: 11,000

27 October 2014 Round of 16	Esteghlal	4–2	Parseh	Tehran
16:40 DST+03:30	Karrar 46', 90+3'; Shahbazzadeh 51' (yellow card) 45' (red card) 70'; Andranik Teymourian (yellow card) 67'; Khosro Heydari (yellow card) 68'; Ghazi 90+1'	Varzesh3	Poursafshekan 9'; Ashouri 90+1'	Stadium: Azadi Stadium; Attendance: 4,000; Referee: Mohsen Torky

27 November 2014 Quarter-Final	Zob Ahan	2–2 (a.e.t.) (3–0 p)	Esteghlal	Isfahan
17:20 DST+03:30	Dehnavi 23'; Hassanzadeh 75'		Borhani 7'; Jassim 22'	Stadium: Fooladshahr Stadium; Attendance: 9,500; Referee: Alborz Hajipour
	Penalties
	Rajabzadeh (penalty scored); Santos (penalty scored); Dehnavi (penalty scored)		Beikzadeh (penalty missed); Ebrahimi (penalty missed); Borhani (penalty missed)

== Friendlies ==
Win Draw Loss Postponed

=== Pre-season ===
11 July 2014	Bursaspor (Turkey)	2–0	(Iran) Esteghlal	Istanbul, Turkey
18:00 EEST (UTC+03:00)				Stadium: Green Park Camp

15 July 2014	Esteghlal (Iran)	2–3	(Algeria) USM Alger	Istanbul, Turkey
18:30 EEST (UTC+03:00)				Stadium: Green Park Camp

==== Shohada tournament ====
21 July 2014	Esteghlal	2–1	Malavan	Tehran, Iran
22:15 IRDT (UTC+04:30)	Borhani 68' (pen.), 77'	report	Rafkhaei 18'	Stadium: Takhti Stadium; Attendance: 2,000; Referee: Mehdi Seyed-Ali

24 July 2014	Esteghlal	1–2	Tractor Sazi	Tehran, Iran
22:15 IRDT (UTC+04:30)	Ghazi 15'	report	Ahmadzadeh 45'; Dalir 55'	Stadium: Takhti Stadium; Attendance: 20,000; Referee: Iman Ariyamansh

=== During season ===
20 August 2014	Esteghlal	1–1	Khooneh Be Khooneh	Tehran, Iran
18:00 IRDT (UTC+04:30)	Nouri 12'	report		Stadium: Nasser Hejazi Camp; Attendance: 60

6 September 2014	Esteghlal	3–1	Parseh	Tehran, Iran
17:00 IRDT (UTC+04:30)	Noorafkan; Tahuni	report		Stadium: Nasser Hejazi Camp; Attendance: 100

12 October 2014	FC Shirak (Armenia)	3–2	(Iran) Esteghlal	Gyumri, Armenia
		report	Ghazi 87' (pen.); Karimi 90'	Stadium: Gyumri City Stadium; Attendance: 500

16 November 2014	Esteghlal	1–1	Saipa	Tehran, Iran
	Fakhreddini 50'	report	Ayoubi 70'	Stadium: Nasser Hejazi Camp

6 January 2015	Esteghlal	1–1	Padideh	Kish, Iran
	Enayati	report	Jovanović	Stadium: Olympic Kish; Attendance: 600

13 January 2015	Esteghlal	1–1	Mes Kerman	Kish, Iran
	Karrar (pen.)	report	?	Stadium: Olympic Kish; Attendance: 700

16 January 2015	Sanat Naft	0–1	Esteghlal	Abadan, Iran
			Shahbazzadeh 42'	Stadium: Takhti Stadium

22 January 2015	Esteghlal	1–1	Rah Ahan	Tehran, Iran
	Fakhreddini 72'		Mohammadrezaei 5'	Stadium: Nasser Hejazi Camp

16 February 2015	Esteghlal	2–2	Parseh	Tehran, Iran
	Mohsen Karimi 25'; Milad Soleiman Fallah 60'	report	Shahab Zandi 61'; Ali Shams 89'	Stadium: Nasser Hejazi Camp; Attendance: 50

26 February 2015	Aluminium Arak	3–3	Esteghlal	Arak, Iran
15:00 IRST (UTC+03:30)	Nasiri 10'; Javad Molaie 75' 90'	report	Karimi 21'; Fakhreddini 53'; Noorafkan 56'	Stadium: Imam Khomeini Stadium; Attendance: 10,000

17 March 2015	Esteghlal	2–1	Aluminium Hormozgan	Tehran, Iran
15:00 IRST (UTC+03:30)	Karimi 35', 36'	report	Alekasir 47'	Stadium: Nasser Hejazi Camp; Attendance: 100

19 March 2015	Esteghlal	1–4	Saba Qom	Tehran, Iran
15:30 IRST (UTC+03:30)	Karimi 80'	report	Alimohammadi 12'; Kalantari 44', 45'; Forouzan 57' (o.g.)	Stadium: Nasser Hejazi Camp

27 March 2015	Esteghlal	1–1	Saipa	Tehran, Iran
17:00 IRDT (UTC+04:30)	Nouri	report report 2	Zahedi	Stadium: Nasser Hejazi Camp; Attendance: 250

== Statistics ==
=== Appearances and goals ===
No.	Pos	Nat	Player	Total		Iran Pro League		Hazfi Cup	
No.	Pos	Nat	Player	Apps	Goals	Apps	Goals	Apps	Goals
Goalkeepers
1	GK	(Iran) IRI	Mohsen Forouzan	28	0	26	0	2	0
Defenders
2	DF	(Iran) IRI	Khosro Heidari	23	1	21	1	2	0
3	DF	(Iran) IRI	Mohammad Reza Khorsandnia	24	0	22	0	2	0
4	DF	(Iran) IRI	Amir Hossein Sadeghi	21	1	19	1	2	0
5	DF	(Iran) IRI	Hanif Omranzadeh	13	0	13	0	0	0
15	DF	(Armenia) ARM	Hrayr Mkoyan	20	0	20	0	0	0
16	DF	(Iran) IRI	Hashem Beikzadeh	21	1	21	1	0	0
34	DF	(Iran) IRI	Milad Fakhreddini	24	1	22	1	2	0
Midfielders
6	MF	(Iran) IRI	Omid Ebrahimi	27	8	25	8	2	0
13	MF	(Iraq) IRQ	Karrar Jassim	20	4	20	2	0	2
17	MF	(Iran) IRI	Yaghoub Karimi	20	1	18	1	2	0
19	MF	(Iran) IRI	Alireza Ramezani	11	1	10	0	1	1
31	MF	(Iran) IRI	Milad Nouri	8	0	8	0	0	0
Strikers
9	FW	(Iran) IRI	Arash Borhani	22	2	22	2	0	0
10	FW	(Iran) IRI	Sajjad Shahbazzadeh	29	12	27	11	2	1
29	FW	(Iran) IRI	Milad Soleiman Fallah	3	0	3	0	0	0
80	FW	(Iran) IRI	Reza Enayati	10	4	10	4	0	0
Players sold or loaned out or retired after the start of the season:
8	MF	(Iran) IRI	Pejman Nouri	13	0	12	0	1	0
14	MF	(Iran) IRI	Andranik Teymourian	16	0	14	0	2	0
23	MF	(Iran) IRI	Mehdi Karimian	11	1	9	1	2	0
32	FW	(Iran) IRI	Amir Hossein Tahuni	4	0	3	0	1	0
11	FW	(Iran) IRI	Mohammad Ghazi	17	5	15	4	2	1

Last updated: 1 May 2015.
Source: Competitive matches

=== Disciplinary record ===
Includes all competitive matches. Players with 1 card or more included only.

No.	Nat.	Position	Name	Iran Pro League			Hazfi Cup			Total		
No.	Nat.	Position	Name	Yellow card	(yellow card) (yellow-red card)	Red card	Yellow card	(yellow card) (yellow-red card)	Red card	Yellow card	(yellow card) (yellow-red card)	Red card
34	(Iran)	DF	Milad Fakhreddini	8	0	0	0	0	0	8	0	0
13	(Iraq)	MF	Karrar Jassim	4	1	0	0	0	0	4	1	0
14	(Iran)	MF	~~Andranik Teymourian~~	3	0	0	2	0	0	5	0	0
3	(Iran)	DF	Mohammad Reza Khorsandnia	2	0	0	1	0	0	3	0	0
4	(Iran)	DF	Amir Hossein Sadeghi	2	0	0	1	0	0	3	0	0
2	(Iran)	DF	Khosro Heydari	1	0	0	2	0	0	3	0	0
16	(Iran)	DF	Hashem Beikzadeh	3	0	0	0	0	0	3	0	0
9	(Iran)	FW	Arash Borhani	2	0	0	0	0	0	2	0	0
11	(Iran)	FW	~~Mohammad Ghazi~~	1	0	0	1	0	0	2	0	0
10	(Iran)	FW	Sajjad Shahbazzadeh	1	0	0	0	1	0	1	1	0
6	(Iran)	MF	Omid Ebrahimi	1	0	0	0	0	0	1	0	0
19	(Iran)	MF	Alireza Ramezani	1	0	0	0	0	0	1	0	0
29	(Iran)	FW	Milad Soleiman Fallah	1	0	0	0	0	0	1	0	0
17	(Iran)	MF	Yaghoub Karimi	0	0	0	1	0	0	1	0	0
5	(Iran)	DF	Hanif Omranzadeh	1	0	0	0	0	0	1	0	0
TOTALS				31	0	0	8	1	0	39	2	0

Last updated: 20 February 2015
Source: Competitive matches and ipl

=== Top scorers ===
The list is sorted by shirt number when total goals are equal.

Rnk	Pos	No.	Player	Pro League	Hazfi Cup	Total
1	FW	10	(Iran) Sajjad Shahbazzadeh	12	1	13
2	MF	6	(Iran) Omid Ebrahimi	9	0	9
3	FW	~~11~~	(Iran) ~~Mohammad Ghazi~~	4	1	5
3	MF	13	(Iraq) Karrar Jassim	3	3	6
5	FW	9	(Iran) Arash Borhani	2	1	3
6	DF	2	(Iran) Khosro Heydari	1	0	1
6	DF	4	(Iran) Amir Hossein Sadeghi	1	0	1
6	MF	16	(Iran) Hashem Beikzadeh	1	0	1
6	MF	17	(Iran) Yaghob Karimi	1	0	1
6	MF	19	(Iran) Alireza Ramezani	0	1	1
6	MF	~~23~~	(Iran) ~~Mehdi Karimian~~	1	0	1
6	DF	34	(Iran) Milad Fakhreddini	1	0	1
6	FW	80	(Iran) Reza Enayati	1	0	1
TOTALS				33	7	40

Last updated: 8 July 2015
Source: Competitive matches

=== Top Assister ===
The list is sorted by shirt number when total goals are equal.

Rnk	Pos	No.	Player	Pro League	Hazfi Cup	Total
1	MF	13	(Iraq) Karrar Jassim	8	2	10
2	DF	2	(Iran) Khosro Heydari	4	0	4
2	MF	17	(Iran) Yaghoub Karimi	3	1	4
4	FW	9	(Iran) Arash Borhani	2	1	3
5	FW	10	(Iran) Sajjad Shahbazzadeh	2	0	2
6	DF	5	(Iran) Hanif Omranzadeh	1	0	1
6	MF	19	(Iran) Alireza Ramezani	1	0	1
6	DF	34	(Iran) Milad Fakhreddini	1	0	1
TOTALS				22	4	26

Last updated: 8 February 2015
Source: Competitive matches

=== Goals conceded ===
Position	Nation	Number	Name	Pro League	Hazfi Cup	Total	Minutes per goal
GK	(Iran)	1	Mohsen Forouzan	23	4	27	72.2 min
GK	(Brazil)	~~12~~	~~Alberto Rafael da Silva~~	0	0	0	0 min
GK	(Iran)	21	Farzin Garousian	0	0	0	0 min
GK	(Iran)	30	Vahid Talebloo	0	0	0	0 min
TOTALS				23	4	27	72.2 min

Last updated: 30 January 2015
Source: Competitive matches

=== Overall statistics ===
	Total			Home			Away		
	Pro League	Hazfi Cup	Total	Pro League	Hazfi Cup	Total	Pro League	Hazfi Cup	Total
Games played	16	3	19	8	1	9	8	2	10
Games won	8	2	10	5	1	6	3	1	4
Games drawn	3	1	4	2	0	2	1	1	2
Games lost	5	0	5	2	0	2	3	0	3
Biggest win	3–0	4–2	3–0	3–0	4–2	3–0	3–0	1–0	3–0
Biggest loss	3–1	N/A	3–1	2–1	N/A	2–1	3–1	N/A	3–1
Clean sheets	5	1	6	3	0	3	2	1	3
Goals scored	25	7	32	13	4	17	12	3	15
Goals conceded	18	4	22	7	2	9	11	2	13
Goal difference	+7	+3	+10	+6	+2	+8	+1	+1	+2
Average GF per game	1.6	2.3	1.7	1.6	4	1.9	1.5	1.5	1.5
Average GA per game	1.1	1.3	1.2	0.9	2	1	1.4	1	1.3
Points	27/48 (56.25%)	7/9 (77.78%)	34/57 (59.65%)	19/24 (79.17%)	3/3 (100%)	22/27 (81.48%)	8/24 (33.33%)	4/6 (66.67%)	12/30 (40%)
Winning rate	50%	66.67%	52.63%	62.5%	100%	66.67%	37.5%	50%	40%
Most appearances	16	3	19	(Iran) Mohsen Forouzan					
Most minutes played	1440	330	1770	(Iran) Mohsen Forouzan					
Top scorer	7	1	8	(Iran) Sajjad Shahbazzadeh					
Top assister	5	2	7	(Iraq) Karrar Jassim					

Last updated: 4 December 2014
Source: Competitive matches

== See also ==
- 2014–15 Iran Pro League
- 2014–15 Hazfi Cup
