= 2013–14 Esteghlal F.C. season =

Esteghlal F.C.
2013–14 season
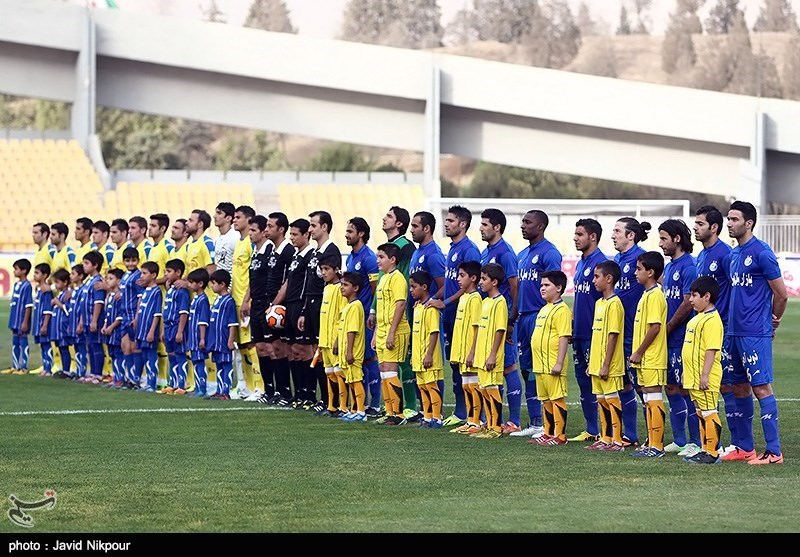
- Chairman: Ali Fathollahzadeh
- Manager: Amir Ghalenoei
- Stadium: Azadi Stadium
- IPL: 5th
- Hazfi Cup: Semi-Final
- Champions League: 2013: Semi-finals; 2014: Group stage
- Top goalscorer: League: Mohammad Ghazi (7 goals); All: Mohammad Ghazi; Hanif Omranzadeh (8 goals)
- Highest home attendance: 100,000 vs Persepolis (6 September 2013)
- Lowest home attendance: 1,000 vs Damash (24 December 2013); 1,000 vs Esteghlal Khuzestan (11 January 2014)
- Average home league attendance: 19,453
| Home colours | Away colours | Third colours |

The 2013–14 season are the Esteghlal Football Club's 13th season in the Iran Pro League, and their 20th consecutive season in the top division of Iranian football. They are also competing in the Hazfi Cup and AFC Champions League, and 69th year in existence as a football club.

== Club ==
=== Kit ===
Supplier: (Germany) Uhlsport, Merooj
Sponsor(s): Taban Air, Bazar Mobl Iran, Zagros Air, Vistar, Majol, Shahr Bank

| Home Kit | Away Kit | Third Kit |

=== Coaching staff ===
| Position | Staff |
|---|---|
| Head coach | Parviz Mazloomi |
| Assistant coach | Majid Saleh |
| Assistant coach | Karim Bostani |
| Assistant coach | Sattar Hamedani |
| Goalkeepers coach | Hamid Babazadeh |
| Fitness trainer | Amir Haj-Ghasem |
| Analyzers | Shahrokh Bayani, Iman Alami, Nima Rasouli |
| Physiotherapists | Amin Norouzi, Ferydoon Molaei |
| Doctor | Kaveh Sotoudeh |
| Psychologist | Abbas Montazeri |
| Munition Team | Madad Jabbari, Hossein Amanati |

=== Other personnel ===
| Position | Staff |
|---|---|
| Chairman | Ali Fathollahzadeh |
| Media Officer | Mohammad Nourifar |
| Director | Mirshad Majedi |

=== Grounds ===
| Ground (capacity and dimensions) | Azadi Stadium (100,000 / 110x75m) |
| Training ground | Hejazi Camp |

== Player ==
=== First team squad ===
Last updated: 1 February 2014

| Out for Injuries | Released – retired |

| No. | Name | Nationality | Position(s) | Since | Date of birth (age) | Signed from | Games | Goals |
Goalkeepers
| 1 | Mehdi Rahmati | (Iran) | GK | 2011 | 2 February 1983 (aged 30) | (Iran) Sepahan | 177 | 0 |
| 21 | Hossein Hosseini | (Iran) | GK | 2012 | 30 June 1992 (aged 21) | (Youth system) | 1 | 0 |
Defenders
| 2 | Khosro Heydari | (Iran) | RM, RB | 2011 | 14 September 1983 (aged 29) | (Iran) Sepahan | 173 | 6 |
| 4 | Amir Hossein Sadeghi | (Iran) | CB, SW | 2012 | 6 September 1981 (aged 31) | (Iran) Tractor Sazi | 262 | 15 |
| 5 | Hanif Omranzadeh | (Iran) | CB, SW | 2009 | 30 April 1985 (aged 28) | (Iran) PAS Hamedan | 167 | 19 |
| 16 | Hashem Beikzadeh | (Iran) | LB, LM | 2012 | 22 January 1984 (aged 29) | (Iran) Sepahan | 95 | 3 |
| 70 | Majid Gholamnejad | (Iran) | RB, RM | 2013 | June 18, 1983 (aged 30) | (Iran) Saipa | 9 | 0 |
Midfielders
| 3 | Jlloyd Samuel | (Trinidad and Tobago) | DM, CM, LB | 2011 | 29 March 1981 (aged 32) | (England) Bolton | 78 | 9 |
| 8 | Pejman Nouri | (Iran) | DM, CM, LM | 2013 | 13 July 1980 (aged 33) | (Iran) Malavan | 32 | 0 |
| 14 | Andranik Teymourian | (Iran) | DM, CM | 2013 | 6 March 1983 (aged 30) | (Qatar) Al-Kharitiyath | 52 | 3 |
| 20 | Ahmad Jamshidian | (Iran) | AM, RM | 2013 | 6 May 1984 (aged 29) | (Iran) Sepahan | 9 | 0 |
| 22 | Alireza Nikbakht | (Iran) | LB, LM, LW | 2013 | 13 July 1980 (aged 33) | (Iran) Damash | 161 | 40 |
| 27 | Tony | (Brazil) | AM, SS | 2014 | 29 May 1986 (aged 27) | (Brazil) ABC | 5 | 0 |
| 34 | Iman Basafa | (Iran) | MF | 2013 | 3 January 1992 (aged 21) | (Iran) Shahrdari Arak | 7 | 0 |
Forwards
| 9 | Arash Borhani | (Iran) | CF, RW, LW | 2007 | 14 September 1983 (aged 29) | (Iran) PAS Tehran | 241 | 100 |
| 10 | Siavash Akbarpour | (Iran) | AM, SS | 2012 | 21 January 1985 (aged 28) | (Iran) Tractor Sazi | 206 | 46 |
| 11 | Mohammad Ghazi | (Iran) | CF, LW, ST | 2013 | 30 December 1984 (aged 28) | (Iran) Persepolis | 28 | 7 |
| 19 | Boubacar Kébé | (Burkina Faso) | ST | 2013 | 10 May 1987 (aged 26) | (Iran) Damash Gilan | 2 | 1 |
| 32 | Mehdi Nazari | (Iran) | ST | 2013 | 2 March 1990 (aged 23) | (Iran) Fajr Sepasi | 26 | 1 |
| 77 | Mehrdad Oladi | (Iran) | CF | 2013 | 25 May 1985 (aged 28) | (Iran) Naft Tehran | 11 | 1 |
Players transferred during the season
| 6 | Javad Nekounam | (Iran) | CM, DM, AM | 2012 | 7 October 1980 (aged 32) | (Spain) Osasuna | 59 | 12 |
| 7 | Farhad Majidi (c) | (Iran) | CF, SS, AM | 2007 | 3 June 1976 (aged 37) | (United Arab Emirates) Al-Ahli | 186 | 92 |
| 26 | Fardin Abedini | (Iran) | RM, RB | 2010 | 18 November 1991 (aged 21) | (Youth system) | 16 | 0 |
| 28 | Mehran Ghasemi | (Iran) | MF | 2012 | 11 November 1991 (aged 21) | (Iran) Steel Azin | 3 | 0 |
| 31 | Goran Lovre | (Serbia) | AM, CM, RM | 2013 | 23 March 1982 (aged 31) | (Serbia) Partizan | 3 | 0 |
| 33 | Pejman Montazeri | (Iran) | CB, SW | 2007 | 6 September 1983 (aged 29) | (Iran) Foolad | 235 | 16 |

=== Iran Pro League squad ===
Note: Flags indicate national team as defined under FIFA eligibility rules; some limited exceptions apply. Players may hold more than one non-FIFA nationality.

| No. | Pos. | Nation | Player |
|---|---|---|---|
| 1 | GK | IRI | Mehdi Rahmati (Captain) |
| 2 | DF | IRI | Khosro Heydari |
| 3 | DF | TTO | Jlloyd Samuel (3rd vice Captain) |
| 4 | DF | IRI | Amir Hossein Sadeghi |
| 5 | DF | IRI | Hanif Omranzadeh (2nd vice Captain) |
| 8 | MF | IRI | Pejman Nouri |
| 9 | FW | IRI | Arash Borhani (1st vice Captain) |
| 10 | FW | IRI | Siavash Akbarpour |
| 11 | FW | IRI | Mohammad Ghazi |
| 12 | DF | IRI | Meysam Joudaki ^{U21} |
| 14 | MF | IRI | Andranik Teymourian |
| 16 | DF | IRI | Hashem Beikzadeh |

| No. | Pos. | Nation | Player |
|---|---|---|---|
| 17 | MF | IRI | Hamed Khosravi ^{U21} |
| 18 | FW | IRI | Babak Jabbari ^{U21} |
| 19 | FW | BFA | Boubacar Kébé |
| 20 | MF | IRI | Ahmad Jamshidian |
| 21 | GK | IRI | Hossein Hosseini ^{U23} |
| 22 | MF | IRI | Alireza Vahedi Nikbakht |
| 27 | MF | BRA | Antônio de Moura Carvalho |
| 32 | FW | IRI | Mehdi Nazari |
| 34 | MF | IRI | Iman Basafa ^{U23} |
| 70 | DF | IRI | Majid Gholamnejad |
| 77 | FW | IRI | Mehrdad Oladi |

- U21 = Under 21 Player
- U23 = Under 23 Player

Source: 2013–14 Pro League squad

=== ACL 2013 squad ===
Note: Flags indicate national team as defined under FIFA eligibility rules; some limited exceptions apply. Players may hold more than one non-FIFA nationality.

| No. | Pos. | Nation | Player |
|---|---|---|---|
| 1 | GK | IRI | Mehdi Rahmati (Vice-Captain) |
| 2 | DF | IRI | Khosro Heydari |
| 3 | MF | TTO | Jlloyd Samuel |
| 4 | DF | IRI | Amir Hossein Sadeghi |
| 5 | DF | IRI | Hanif Omranzadeh |
| 6 | MF | IRI | Javad Nekounam |
| 7 | FW | IRI | Farhad Majidi (Captain) |
| 8 | MF | IRI | Pejman Nouri |
| 9 | FW | IRI | Arash Borhani |
| 10 | MF | IRI | Siavash Akbarpour |
| 11 | FW | IRI | Mohammad Ghazi |
| 12 | DF | IRI | Meysam Joudaki |
| 14 | MF | IRI | Andranik Teymourian |

| No. | Pos. | Nation | Player |
|---|---|---|---|
| 15 | MF | IRI | Ehsan Pirhadi |
| 16 | MF | IRI | Hashem Beikzadeh |
| 18 | MF | IRI | Babak Jabbari |
| 19 | DF | IRI | Ghasem Ramandi |
| 20 | MF | IRI | Ahmad Jamshidian |
| 21 | MF | IRI | Alireza Vahedi Nikbakht |
| 22 | GK | IRI | Hossein Hosseini |
| 26 | MF | IRI | Fardin Abedini |
| 28 | MF | IRI | Mehran Ghasemi |
| 31 | MF | SRB | Goran Lovre |
| 32 | FW | IRI | Mehdi Nazari |
| 33 | DF | IRI | Pejman Montazeri |

Source: 2013 ACL squad

=== ACL 2014 squad ===
Note: Flags indicate national team as defined under FIFA eligibility rules; some limited exceptions apply. Players may hold more than one non-FIFA nationality.

| No. | Pos. | Nation | Player |
|---|---|---|---|
| 1 | GK | IRI | Mehdi Rahmati (Vice-Captain) |
| 2 | DF | IRI | Khosro Heydari |
| 3 | MF | TTO | Jlloyd Samuel |
| 4 | DF | IRI | Amir Hossein Sadeghi |
| 5 | DF | IRI | Hanif Omranzadeh |
| 8 | MF | IRI | Pejman Nouri |
| 9 | FW | IRI | Arash Borhani |
| 10 | MF | IRI | Siavash Akbarpour |
| 11 | FW | IRI | Mohammad Ghazi |
| 12 | GK | IRI | Mehrdad Hosseini |
| 13 | DF | IRI | Ghasem Ramandi |
| 14 | MF | IRI | Andranik Teymourian |
| 15 | DF | IRI | Ahmad Nematollahi |

| No. | Pos. | Nation | Player |
|---|---|---|---|
| 16 | MF | IRI | Hashem Beikzadeh |
| 17 | DF | IRI | Meysam Joudaki |
| 18 | MF | IRI | Babak Jabbari |
| 19 | FW | BFA | Boubacar Kébé |
| 20 | MF | IRI | Ahmad Jamshidian |
| 21 | GK | IRI | Hossein Hosseini |
| 22 | MF | IRI | Alireza Vahedi Nikbakht |
| 23 | MF | IRI | Iman Mobali |
| 27 | MF | BRA | Antônio de Moura Carvalho |
| 32 | FW | IRI | Mehdi Nazari |
| 34 | MF | IRI | Iman Basafa |
| 70 | DF | IRI | Majid Gholamnejad |
| 77 | FW | IRI | Mehrdad Oladi |

== Transfers ==
=== Summer ===
In: Note: Flags indicate national team as defined under FIFA eligibility rules; some limited exceptions apply. Players may hold more than one non-FIFA nationality.

| No. | Pos. | Nation | Player |
|---|---|---|---|
| 20 | MF | IRI | Ahmad Jamshidian ^{PL} (from Sepahan) |
| 26 | MF | IRI | Fardin Abedini (Loan return from Tractor Sazi) |
| 32 | FW | IRI | Mohammad Mehdi Nazari ^{PL} (from Fajr Sepasi) |
| 8 | MF | IRI | Pejman Nouri ^{PL} (from Malavan) |
| 11 | FW | IRI | Mohammad Ghazi ^{PL} (from Persepolis) |
| 22 | MF | IRI | Alireza Vahedi Nikbakht (from Damash) |
| 14 | MF | IRI | Andranik Teymourian (from (Qatar) Al-Kharitiyath) |
| 31 | MF | SRB | Goran Lovre (from (Serbia) Partizan) |
| 17 | MF | IRI | Hamed Khosravi (from Shahrdari Tabriz) |

Out: Note: Flags indicate national team as defined under FIFA eligibility rules; some limited exceptions apply. Players may hold more than one non-FIFA nationality.

| No. | Pos. | Nation | Player |
|---|---|---|---|
| 38 | MF | BOL | Vicente Arze (Loan return to (Belgium) Charleroi) |
| — | MF | IRI | Mehdi Shiri (to Malavan) |
| 12 | DF | IRI | Hassan Ashjari (to Malavan) |
| 17 | MF | IRI | Maysam Baou (to Tractor Sazi) |
| 40 | DF | IRI | Ali Hamoudi (to Sepahan) |
| 36 | FW | IRI | Iman Mousavi (to Gostaresh Foulad) |
| 19 | MF | IRI | Abbas Mohammadrezaei (to Foolad) |
| — | MF | IRI | Mohammad Hosseinpour (to Rah Ahan Sorinet) |
| 21 | MF | IRI | Armen Tahmasian (to (Armenia) Ararat Yerevan) |
| 24 | FW | IRI | Farzad Hatami (to Foolad) |
| 14 | MF | IRI | Kianoush Rahmati (to Saipa) |
| 8 | MF | IRI | Mojtaba Jabbari (to Sepahan) |
| 25 | FW | IRI | Hojjat Chaharmahali (Esteghlal Khuzestan) |
| 26 | MF | IRI | Mehdi Eslami (to Padideh Shandiz) |
| 35 | GK | IRI | Hadi Rishi Esfahani (to Shahrdari Bandar Abbas) |
| — | FW | IRI | Farhad Gholizadeh (to Sanat Naft) |

=== Winter ===
In: Note: Flags indicate national team as defined under FIFA eligibility rules; some limited exceptions apply. Players may hold more than one non-FIFA nationality.

| No. | Pos. | Nation | Player |
|---|---|---|---|
| 19 | FW | BFA | Boubacar Kébé (from Damash) |
| 77 | FW | IRI | Mehrdad Oladi (from Naft Tehran) |
| 34 | MF | IRI | Iman Basafa (from Free agent) |
| 70 | DF | IRI | Majid Gholamnejad (from Saipa) |
| 27 | MF | BRA | Antônio de Moura Carvalho (from (Brazil) ABC) |

Out: Note: Flags indicate national team as defined under FIFA eligibility rules; some limited exceptions apply. Players may hold more than one non-FIFA nationality.

| No. | Pos. | Nation | Player |
|---|---|---|---|
| 7 | FW | IRI | Farhad Majidi (Retired) |
| 26 | DF | IRI | Fardin Abedini (to Gostaresh Foulad) |
| 28 | MF | IRI | Mehran Ghasemi (to Zob Ahan) |
| 15 | MF | IRI | Ehsan Pirhadi (to Pas Hamedan) |
| 31 | MF | SRB | Goran Lovre (Released, to (Germany) SSV Ulm 1846) |
| 33 | DF | IRI | Pejman Montazeri (to (Qatar) Umm Salal) |
| 6 | MF | IRI | Javad Nekounam (to Al-Kuwait) |

== Competitions ==
=== Overall ===
| Competition | Started round | Current position / round | Final position / round | First match | Last match |
|---|---|---|---|---|---|
| 2013–14 Iran Pro League | — | — | | 25 July 2013 | 21 May 2014 |
| 2013–14 Hazfi Cup | Round of 32 | — | Semi-Final | | |
| AFC Champions League | Round of 16 | — | Semi-finals | 21 August 2013 | 2 October 2013 |
| AFC Champions League | Group stage | Group stage | | February 2014 | |

Updated to match played 17 June 2013
Source: Competitions
Note: Current Position/Round Only use for team still a part of Competition.

=== Competition record ===
| Competition | Record | | | | | | | |
| Competition | G | W | D | L | GF | GA | GD | Win % |
|---|---|---|---|---|---|---|---|---|
| Iran Pro League | 26 | 14 | 9 | 3 | 30 | 17 | +13 | 53.85 |
| Hazfi Cup | 4 | 3 | 0 | 1 | 5 | 2 | +3 | 75.00 |
| 2013 AFC Champions League | 4 | 2 | 1 | 1 | 5 | 5 | +0 | 50.00 |
| 2014 AFC Champions League | 0 | 0 | 0 | 0 | 0 | 0 | +0 | — |
| Total | 34 | 19 | 10 | 5 | 40 | 24 | +16 | 55.88 |

=== Iran Pro League ===
==== Standings ====
| Pos | Team | Pld | W | D | L | GF | GA | GD | Pts | Qualification or relegation |
|---|---|---|---|---|---|---|---|---|---|---|
| 3 | Naft Tehran | 30 | 15 | 9 | 6 | 39 | 23 | +16 | 54 | Qualification for the 2015 AFC Champions League qualifying play-off |
| 4 | Sepahan | 30 | 14 | 12 | 4 | 36 | 20 | +16 | 54 | |
| 5 | Esteghlal | 30 | 15 | 9 | 6 | 34 | 25 | +9 | 53 (Note: Esteghlal, Malavan, Damash, Persepolis and Tractor Sazi were deducted 1 point due to poor fan behavior in their home matches.) | |
| 6 | Tractor Sazi | 30 | 11 | 13 | 6 | 39 | 33 | +6 | 45 | Qualification for the 2015 AFC Champions League group stage (Note: Tractor Sazi secured qualification for the 2015 AFC Champions League through winning the 2013–14 Hazfi Cup.) |
| 7 | Malavan | 30 | 13 | 6 | 11 | 40 | 33 | +7 | 44 | |

Updated to match(es) played on 11 April 2014. Source: FIFA.com
Rules for classification: 1) points; 2) goal difference; 3) number of goals scored.

==== Results summary ====
| Overall | | | | | | | | Home | | | | | | Away | | | | | |
| Pld | W | D | L | GF | GA | GD | Pts | W | D | L | GF | GA | GD | W | D | L | GF | GA | GD |
|---|---|---|---|---|---|---|---|---|---|---|---|---|---|---|---|---|---|---|---|
| 30 | 15 | 9 | 6 | 34 | 25 | +9 | 54 | 8 | 4 | 3 | 16 | 9 | +7 | 7 | 5 | 3 | 18 | 16 | +2 |

Last updated: 11 April 2014.
Source: Ipl Stats

==== Results by round ====
| Round | 1 | 2 | 3 | 4 | 5 | 6 | 7 | 8 | 9 | 10 | 11 | 12 | 13 | 14 | 15 | 16 | 17 | 18 | 19 | 20 | 21 | 22 | 23 | 24 | 25 | 26 | 27 | 28 | 29 | 30 |
|---|---|---|---|---|---|---|---|---|---|---|---|---|---|---|---|---|---|---|---|---|---|---|---|---|---|---|---|---|---|---|
| Ground | A | H | A | H | A | H | A | H | A | H | A | H | A | H | A | H | A | H | A | H | A | H | A | H | A | H | A | H | A | H |
| Result | W | L | W | W | W | W | L | D | L | D | W | W | D | W | D | D | D | W | W | W | W | W | D | D | D | W | L | L | W | L |
| Position | 3 | 6 | 3 | 2 | 2 | 2 | 2 | 4 | 6 | 6 | 5 | 3 | 4 | 2 | 2 | 3 | 4 | 4 | 3 | 2 | 1 | 1 | 1 | 1 | 1 | 1 | 2 | 5 | 5 | 5 |

Updated to match(es) played on 11 April 2014. Source: "Ipl".
A = Away; H = Home; W = Win; D = Draw; L = Loss

==== Matches ====
Win Draw Loss Postponed

| 25 July 2013 1 | Gostaresh Foulad | 1 – 2 | Esteghlal | Tabriz |
| 22:15 IRDT (UTC+04:30) | Bayrami 19' | Goal report | Borhani 33'; Omranzadeh (yellow card) 74'; Beikzadeh (yellow card) 83'; Samuel (red card) 87'; Majidi 89' | Stadium: Yadegar-e Emam Stadium; Attendance: 10,000; Referee: Hossein Zargar; Man of the Match: Farhad Majidi |

| 1 August 2013 2 | Esteghlal | 1 – 2 | Sepahan | Tehran |
| 22:15 IRDT (UTC+04:30) | Sadeghi 77' (yellow card); Majidi (yellow card); Akbarpour (yellow card) | Goal report | Afshin 2'; Aghili 55' | Stadium: Azadi Stadium; Attendance: 65,000; Referee: Alireza Faghani |

| 6 August 2013 3 | Fajr Sepasi | 2 – 4 | Esteghlal | Shiraz |
| 22:15 IRDT (UTC+04:30) | Jokar 36'; Heidari 53' | Gaol report | Nekounam 34' (pen.); Ghazi 47'; Omranzadeh 73'; Majidi 83' | Stadium: Hafezieh Stadium; Attendance: 12,000; Referee: Saeed Mozafarizadeh |

| 10 August 2013 4 | Esteghlal | 1 – 0 | Saba Qom | Tehran |
| 21:15 IRDT (UTC+04:30) | Ghazi 31'; Teymourian (yellow card); Ghazi (yellow card) | Goal report | | Stadium: Azadi Stadium; Attendance: 17,300; Referee: Toraj Haghverdi |

| 15 August 2013 5 | Damash Gilan | 1 – 2 | Esteghlal | Rasht |
| 19:20 IRDT (UTC+04:30) | Motavaselzadeh 16' | Goal report | Akbarpour 25'; Majidi 68' | Stadium: Dr. Azodi Stadium; Attendance: 13,000; Referee: Ahmad Salehi; Man of the Match: Farhad Majidi |

| 25 August 2013 6 | Esteghlal | 3 – 1 | Rah Ahan | Tehran |
| 19:10 IRDT (UTC+04:30) | Ghazi 12'; Montazeri (yellow card) 59'; Samuel 67'; Majidi (yellow card) 79'; Nekounam (yellow card) 60' (goal) 86' | Goal report | Abdi 52' | Stadium: Azadi Stadium; Attendance: 10,000; Referee: Mohsen Torki; Man of the Match: Jlloyd Samuel |

| 31 August 2013 7 | Esteghlal Khuzestan | 2 – 0 | Esteghlal | Ahvaz |
| 19:00 IRDT (UTC+04:30) | Kaebi (yellow card) 79'; Kolahkaj 38'; Bigdeli 75' | Goal Report | Montazeri (yellow card) 67' | Stadium: Takhti Stadium; Attendance: 10,000; Referee: Mohammadreza Akbarian; Man of the Match: Iman Mobali |

| 6 September 2013 8 | Esteghlal | 0 – 0 | Persepolis | Tehran |
| 18:50 IRDT (UTC+04:30) | Montazeri (yellow card); Nazari (yellow card); Ghazi (yellow card) | Goal report | | Stadium: Azadi Stadium; Attendance: 100,000; Referee: Alireza Faghani; Man of the Match: Payam Sadeghian |

| 12 September 2013 9 | Zob Ahan | 2 – 0 | Esteghlal | Isfahan |
| 20:00 IRDT (UTC+04:30) | Rajabzadeh 14'; Haddadifar 50' | Goal report | Nouri (yellow card); Nazari (yellow card) | Stadium: Fooladshahr Stadium; Attendance: 8,000; Referee: Yadollah Jahanbazi; Man of the Match: Ghasem Haddadifar |

| 29 October 2013 10 | Esteghlal | 1 – 1 | Mes Kerman | Tehran |
| 15:30 IRST (UTC+03:30) | Akbarpour 56' (yellow card); Sadeghi (yellow card); Nekounam (yellow card); Teymourian (yellow card) | Goal report | Shojaei 1' | Stadium: Azadi Stadium; Attendance: 7,000; Referee: Saeid Mozafarizadeh; Man of the Match: Mehdi Rahmati |

| 3 November 2013 11 | Saipa | 0 – 1 | Esteghlal | Karaj |
| 15:00 IRST (UTC+03:30) | | Goal report | Omranzadeh (yellow card); Borhani 63'; Ghazi (yellow card) | Stadium: Enghelab Stadium; Attendance: 12,000; Referee: Alireza Faghani; Man of the Match: Arash Borhani |

| 24 November 2013 12 | Esteghlal | 1 – 0 | Malavan | Tehran |
| 16:20 IRST (UTC+03:30) | Omranzadeh 31'; Teymourian (yellow card) | Goal report | | Stadium: Azadi Stadium; Attendance: 6,000; Referee: Ahmad Salehi; Man of the Match: Hanif Omranzadeh |

| 19 October 2013 13 | Naft Tehran | 1 – 1 | Esteghlal | Tehran |
| 15:45 IRST (UTC+03:30) | Ghafouri 88' | Goal report | Majidi 66' | Stadium: Dastgerdi; Attendance: 600; Referee: Alireza Faghani; Man of the Match: Vouria Ghafouri |

| 25 October 2013 14 | Esteghlal | 2 – 0 | Foolad | Tehran |
| 17:45 IRST (UTC+03:30) | Nekounam 18'; Teymourian 45+3' (yellow card); Mehdi Nazari (yellow card) | Goal report | | Stadium: Azadi Stadium; Attendance: 15,000; Referee: Hossein Zargar; Man of the Match: Teymourian |

| 8 November 2013 15 | Tractor Sazi | 1 – 1 | Esteghlal | Tabriz |
| 15:15 IRST (UTC+03:30) | Baou (yellow card); Nosrati (yellow card); Daghighi 66'; Gordani (yellow card) | Goal report | Borhani 2'; Nekounam (yellow card); Nouri (yellow card) | Stadium: Sahand Stadium; Attendance: 62,000; Referee: Saeed Mozafarizadeh; Man of the Match: Ali Karimi |

| 29 November 2013 16 | Esteghlal | 0 – 0 | Gostaresh Foulad | Tehran |
| 17:30 IRST (UTC+03:30) | Teymourian (yellow card); Nazari (yellow card) | Goal report | | Stadium: Azadi Stadium; Attendance: 5,000; Referee: Toraj Haghverdi; Man of the Match: Mohsen Forouzan |

| 5 December 2013 17 | Sepahan | 0 – 0 | Esteghlal | Isfahan |
| 15:00 IRST (UTC+03:30) | | Goal report | Sadeghi (yellow card); Nekounam (yellow card); Ghazi (yellow card) | Stadium: Fooladshahr Stadium; Attendance: 10,000; Referee: Hossein Zargar; Man of the Match: Mehdi Rahmati |

| 14 December 2013 18 | Esteghlal | 1 – 0 | Fajr Sepasi | Tehran |
| 16:20 IRST (UTC+03:30) | Ghazi (yellow card); Beikzadeh 81' | Goal report | | Stadium: Azadi Stadium; Attendance: 1,500; Referee: Ashkan Khorshidi; Man of the Match: Hashem Beikzadeh |

| 20 December 2013 19 | Saba Qom | 1 – 2 | Esteghlal | Qom |
| 15:05 IRST (UTC+03:30) | Reza Enayati 81' | Goal report | Gholamnejad (yellow card) 18'; Ghazi 40'; Montazeri 65' | Stadium: Yadegar Emam Stadium; Attendance: 9,000; Referee: Saeed Mozafarizadeh; Man of the Match: Mohammad Ghazi |

| 24 December 2013 20 | Esteghlal | 1 – 0 | Damash Gilan | Tehran |
| 16:20 IRST (UTC+03:30) | Omranzadeh (yellow card) 15'; Omranzadeh 41'; Ghazi (yellow card) 82'; Sadeghi (yellow card) 84' | Goal report | | Stadium: Azadi Stadium; Attendance: 1,000; Referee: Yadollah Jahanbazi; Man of the Match: Andranik Teymourian |

| 4 January 2014 21 | Rah Ahan | 0 – 1 | Esteghlal | Tehran |
| 15:00 IRST (UTC+03:30) | | Goal report | Nazari 67' | Stadium: Takhti Stadium; Attendance: 5,000; Referee: Mehdi Seyyed Ali; Man of the Match: Mehdi Nazari |

| 11 January 2014 22 | Esteghlal | 1 – 0 | Esteghlal Khuzestan | Tehran |
| 16:40 IRST (UTC+03:30) | Nikbakht (yellow card) 24'; Samuel (yellow card) 45'; Ghazi 76' | Goal report | | Stadium: Azadi Stadium; Attendance: 1,000; Referee: Shahin Haj Babaei; Man of the Match: Mohammad Ghazi |

| 17 January 2014 23 | Persepolis | 0 – 0 | Esteghlal | Tehran |
| 14:30 IRST (UTC+03:30) | | Goal report | Nouri (yellow card) 8'; Omranzadeh (yellow card) 51'; Beikzadeh (yellow card) 71'; Gholamnejad (yellow card) 90+2' | Stadium: Azadi Stadium; Attendance: 90,000; Referee: Saeed Mozafarizadeh; Man of the Match: Khosro Heydari |

| 26 January 2014 24 | Esteghlal | 1 – 1 | Zob Ahan | Tehran |
| 14:30 IRST (UTC+03:30) | Omranzadeh 86' | Goal report | Bayatinia 25' | Stadium: Azadi Stadium; Attendance: 2,000; Referee: Alborz Hajipour; Man of the Match: Arash Borhani |

| 31 January 2014 25 | Mes Kerman | 1 – 1 | Esteghlal | Kerman |
| 15:00 IRST (UTC+03:30) | Edinho 90+1' | Goal report | Samuel (penalty missed) 40' (yellow card) 79'; Ghazi 42' (yellow card); Akbarpour (yellow card) 87' | Stadium: Shahid Bahonar Stadium; Attendance: 5,000; Referee: Hossein Zargar; Man of the Match: Arash Borhani |

| 9 February 2014 26 | Esteghlal | 2 – 0 | Saipa | Tehran |
| 17:00 IRST (UTC+03:30) | Akbarpour (yellow card) 40'; Borhani 55'; Teymourian (yellow card) 57'; Kébé 74' | Goal report | | Stadium: Azadi Stadium; Attendance: 3,000; Referee: Ahmad Salehi; Man of the Match: Arash Borhani |

| 20 February 2014 27 | Malavan | 4 – 2 | Esteghlal | Anzali |
| 15:30 IRST (UTC+03:30) | Siamak Kouroshi 11'; Ahmad Ahi 14'; Shahin Saghebi 49'; Mehdi Daghagheleh 53' | | Sadeghi (yellow card); Beikzadeh (yellow card); Ghazi 52'; Oladi (yellow card); Omranzadeh 90+4' | Stadium: Takhti Stadium; Attendance: 12,000 |

| 27 March 2014 28 | Esteghlal | 0 – 1 | Naft Tehran | Tehran |
| 17:30 IRDT (UTC+04:30) | Gholamnejad (yellow card); Heydari (yellow card); Nazari (yellow card) | | Norouzi 90+1' (yellow card) | Stadium: Azadi Stadium; Attendance: 8,000 |

| 5 April 2014 29 | Foolad | 0 – 1 | Esteghlal | Ahvaz |
| 17:30 IRDT (UTC+04:30) | Luciano Pereira (yellow card) 52'; Rahmani (red card) 56'; A. Karami (yellow card) 56' | | Samuel (yellow card) 7'; Borhani 23'; Heydari (yellow card) 28'; Teymourian (yellow card) 52' (yellow-red card) 71' | Stadium: Ghadir Stadium; Attendance: 50,199 |

| 11 April 2014 30 | Esteghlal | 1 – 3 | Tractor Sazi | Tehran |
| 17:30 IRDT (UTC+04:30) | Beikzadeh (yellow card); Sadeghi (yellow card); Omranzadeh 43'; Ghazi (yellow card); Oladi (yellow card) | Summary | Kiani (yellow card); Ahmadzadeh 30'; Daghighi (yellow card); Nosrati 52'; Ansarifard (yellow card) (goal) 74' (pen.) | Stadium: Azadi Stadium; Attendance: 50,000; Referee: (Iran) Turaj Haghverdi |

Last updated: 14 February 2014

=== Hazfi Cup ===
| 10 December 2013 Round of 32 | Esteghlal | 1 – 0 | Caspian Qazvin | Tehran |
| 16:20 IRST (UTC+03:30) | Oladi 41'; Basafa (yellow card) | Goal report | | Stadium: Azadi Stadium; Attendance: 150; Referee: Gholamreza Jabbari |

| 29 December 2013 Round of 16 | Esteghlal | 2 – 0 | Malavan | Tehran |
| 16:20 IRST (UTC+03:30) | Omranzadeh 12', 67' (yellow card) 58'; Gholamnejad (yellow card) 36'; Akbarpour (yellow card) 54' | Goal report | Zare (yellow card) 35'; Rafkhaei (red card) 36' | Stadium: Azadi Stadium; Attendance: 9,000 |

| 21 January 2014 Quarter-finals | Zob Ahan | 0 – 1 | Esteghlal | Tehran |
| 16:40 IRST (UTC+03:30) | Tabrizi (yellow card); Salsali (yellow card); Ashouri (yellow card) | Goal report | Gholamnejad (yellow card) 21'; Teymourian (yellow card) 33'; Samuel 43' (pen.); Sadeghi (yellow card) 87' | Stadium: Foolad Shahr Stadium; Attendance: 5,000; Referee: Alireza Faghani |

| 4 February 2014 Semi-finals | Esteghlal | 1 – 2 | Mes Kerman | Tehran |
| 17:00 IRST (UTC+03:30) | Sadeghi 12'; Ghazi (yellow card) | Goal report | Edinho 6', 85'; Ebrahimi (yellow card) | Stadium: Foolad Shahr Stadium; Attendance: 1,000; Referee: Toraj Haghverdi |

Last updated: 14 February 2014

=== 2013 AFC Champions League ===
==== Knock-out stage ====
===== Quarter-finals =====
| 21 August 2013 First leg | Esteghlal (Iran) | 1 – 0 | (Thailand) Buriram United | Tehran, Iran |
| 20:15 IRDT (UTC+04:30) | Heydari 2' | Report | Nuchnum (yellow card) 20'; Srisai (yellow card) 40'; Sukha (yellow card) 72' | Stadium: Azadi Stadium; Attendance: 95,300; Referee: Abdulrahman Abdou (Qatar) |

| 18 September 2013 Second leg | Buriram United (Thailand) | 1 – 2 (1 – 3 agg.) | (Iran) Esteghlal | Buriram, Thailand |
| 18:00 THA (UTC+07:00) | Osmar 38'; Bunmathan (yellow card) 62'; Sukha (yellow card) 67' | Report | Heydari (yellow card) 11'; Omranzadeh (yellow card) 36' (goal) 53'; Majidi (yellow card) 65'; Teymourian (yellow card) 81' (goal) 90+2' | Stadium: Buriram Stadium; Attendance: 19,006; Referee: Ryuji Sato (Japan) |

===== Semi-finals =====
| 25 September 2013 First leg | FC Seoul (South Korea) | 2 – 0 | (Iran) Esteghlal | Seoul, South Korea |
| TBC KST (UTC+09:00) | Damjanović 39'; Ko Yo-Han (yellow card) 28' (goal) 47' | Report | Teymourian (yellow card) 49'; Nekounam (yellow card) 62' | Stadium: Seoul World Cup Stadium; Attendance: 12,774; Referee: Ben Williams (Australia) |

| 2 October 2013 Second leg | Esteghlal (Iran) | 2 – 2 (2 – 4 agg.) | (South Korea) FC Seoul | Tehran, Iran |
| TBC IRST (UTC+03:30) | Samuel 50'; Ghazi 75' | Report | Ha Dae-Sung 38'; Kim Jin-Kyu 80' (pen.) | Stadium: Azadi Stadium; Attendance: 88,330; Referee: Khalil Al Ghamdi (Saudi Arabia) |

Last updated: 14 February 2014

=== 2014 AFC Champions League ===
==== Group stage ====
| Pos | Team | Pld | W | D | L | GF | GA | GD | Pts | Qualification |
|---|---|---|---|---|---|---|---|---|---|---|
| 1 | (Saudi Arabia) Al-Shabab | 6 | 5 | 0 | 1 | 12 | 8 | +4 | 15 | Advance to knockout stage |
| 2 | (United Arab Emirates) Al-Jazira | 6 | 3 | 1 | 2 | 12 | 10 | +2 | 10 | Advance to knockout stage |
| 3 | (Iran) Esteghlal | 6 | 2 | 1 | 3 | 7 | 7 | 0 | 7 | |
| 4 | (Qatar) Al-Rayyan | 6 | 1 | 0 | 5 | 9 | 15 | −6 | 3 | |

| 25 February 2014 1 | Esteghlal (Iran) | 0 – 1 | (Saudi Arabia) Al-Shabab | Tehran, Iran |
| 19:30 IRST (UTC+03:30) | Samuel (yellow card) 51' | Report | Al-Ghamdi (yellow card) 14'; Khalili 58' | Stadium: Azadi Stadium; Attendance: 23,300; Referee: (China) Hai Tan |

| 11 March 2014 2 | Al-Rayyan (Qatar) | 1 – 0 | (Iran) Esteghlal | Al Rayyan, Qatar |
| 18:30 AST (UTC+03:00) | Uche 14'; Mohammed Alaa Eddine (yellow card) 26'; Al-Ali (yellow card) 60' | Report | Omranzadeh (yellow card) 75'; Beikzadeh (yellow card) 81' | Stadium: Ahmed bin Ali Stadium; Attendance: 2,394; Referee: (Australia) Peter Green |

| 18 March 2014 3 | Esteghlal (Iran) | 2 – 2 | (United Arab Emirates) Al-Jazira | Tehran, Iran |
| 19:30 IRST (UTC+03:30) | Ghazi 17'; Jamshidian (yellow card) 63'; Omranzadeh 65' (yellow card) 77' | Report | Barrada 6', 56'; Jucilei (yellow card) 15'; Abdullah Mousa (yellow card) 19'; Khamis Esmaeel (yellow card) 44'; Khalid Sheikh Mohammed (yellow card) 90+4' | Stadium: Azadi Stadium; Attendance: 6,350; Referee: (Sri Lanka) Hettikankanamge Dilan Perera |

| 2 April 2014 4 | Al-Jazira (United Arab Emirates) | 0 – 1 | (Iran) Esteghlal | Abu Dhabi, United Arab Emirates |
| 19:40 UAEST (UTC+04:00) | Abdullah Qasem (yellow card) 85'; Musallem Fayez Al Hamdani (yellow card) 90+4' | Report | Samuel (yellow card) 62'; Ghazi 70'; Rahmati (yellow card) 79' | Stadium: Mohammed Bin Zayed Stadium; Attendance: 13,550; Referee: (South Korea) Kim Dong-Jin |

| 16 April 2014 5 | Al-Shabab (Saudi Arabia) | 2 – 1 | (Iran) Esteghlal | Riyadh, Saudi Arabia |
| 20:35 AST (UTC+03:00) | Sayyaf Al-Beeshi (yellow card) 13'; Rafinha (yellow card) 78'; Fernando Menegazzo 82' (pen.); Saeed Al-Dosari 90+5' | Report | Beikzadeh (yellow card) 26'; Borhani 47'; Oladi (yellow card) 81' | Stadium: King Fahd International Stadium; Attendance: 4,100; Referee: (Bahrain) Nawaf Shukralla |

| 23 April 2014 6 | Esteghlal (Iran) | 3 – 1 | (Qatar) Al-Rayyan | Tehran, Iran |
| 21:30 IRDT (UTC+04:30) | Ghazi (yellow card) 31' (goal) 60'; Kébé 54', 73' | Report | Younes Yaqoub (yellow card) 53'; Ibrahim Dami (yellow card) 59'; Khalfan 81'; Nathan (yellow card) 82' | Stadium: Azadi Stadium; Attendance: 330; Referee: (Malaysia) Mohd Yaacob |

Source: Matches
Last updated: 14 February 2014

== Friendlies ==
=== Pre-season ===
Win Draw Loss Postponed

| 4 July 2013 1 | Esteghlal | 2 – 1 | Damash Karaj | Tehran |
| 18:30 IRDT (UTC+04:30) | Nikbakht 75' (pen.); Pirhadi 78' | report | Khorsandi 20' | Stadium: Hejazi camp Attendance: 1,000 |

| 9 July 2013 2 | Dynamo Kyiv (Ukraine) | 1 – 2 | (Iran) Esteghlal | Kyiv, Ukraine |
| 17:00 EEST (UTC+03:00) | Ruben 18' | report | Borhani 13'; Majidi 69' | Stadium: NSC Olimpiyskiy; Attendance: 4,000; Man of the Match: Majidi |

| 18 July 2013 3 | Esteghlal | 0 – 0 | Zob Ahan | Tehran |
| 18:00 IRDT (UTC+04:30) | | report | | Stadium: Hejazi camp Attendance: 3,000 |

=== During season ===
| 14 October 2013 | Esteghlal | 1 – 2 | Naftoon Tehran | Tehran |
| 15:30 IRST (UTC+03:30) | Nazari 17' | Goal.com report Farsnews.com report | Hamrang 14'; Bahrampour 49' | Attendance: 100 |

| 14 February 2014 | Montakhab Kish | 3 – 6 | Esteghlal | Kish |
| 18:30 IRST (UTC+03:30) | Menarizadeh 36', 44', 76' | report | Sadeghi 8', 91'; Borhani 50', 77'; Kébé 55', 65' | Attendance: 2,000; Referee: Hassan Yousefi |

== Statistics ==
=== Appearances and goals ===
As of 5 DEC 2013

| No. | Pos | Nat | Player | Total | | Iran Pro League | | Hazfi Cup | | AFC Champions League | |
| No. | Pos | Nat | Player | Apps | Goals | Apps | Goals | Apps | Goals | Apps | Goals |
Goalkeepers
| 1 | GK | (Iran) IRI | Mehdi Rahmati | 42 | 0 | 30+0 | 0 | 3+0 | 0 | 9+0 | 0 |
| 21 | GK | (Iran) IRI | Hossein Hosseini | 2 | 0 | 0+0 | 0 | 1+0 | 0 | 1+0 | 0 |
Defenders
| 2 | DF | (Iran) IRI | Khosro Heydari | 28 | 1 | 17+1 | 0 | 2+0 | 0 | 7+1 | 1 |
| 4 | DF | (Iran) IRI | Amir Hossein Sadeghi | 42 | 2 | 28+1 | 1 | 4+0 | 1 | 9+0 | 0 |
| 5 | DF | (Iran) IRI | Hanif Omranzadeh | 39 | 10 | 24+2 | 6 | 4+0 | 2 | 9+0 | 2 |
| 13 | DF | (Iran) IRI | Ghasem Ghamooshi | 1 | 0 | 0+0 | 0 | 0+0 | 0 | 1+0 | 0 |
| 16 | DF | (Iran) IRI | Ahmad Nematollahi | 1 | 0 | 0+0 | 0 | 0+0 | 0 | 1+0 | 0 |
| 16 | DF | (Iran) IRI | Hashem Beikzadeh | 29 | 1 | 16+2 | 1 | 3+0 | 0 | 7+1 | 0 |
| 70 | DF | (Iran) IRI | Majid Gholamnejad | 19 | 0 | 7+7 | 0 | 3+0 | 0 | 2+0 | 0 |
Midfielders
| 3 | MF | (Trinidad and Tobago) TTO | Jlloyd Samuel | 34 | 3 | 21+1 | 1 | 3+0 | 1 | 9+0 | 1 |
| 8 | MF | (Iran) IRI | Pejman Nouri | 42 | 0 | 27+2 | 0 | 4+0 | 0 | 9+0 | 0 |
| 14 | MF | (Iran) IRI | Andranik Teymourian | 31 | 2 | 20+2 | 1 | 4+0 | 0 | 5+0 | 1 |
| 18 | MF | (Iran) IRI | Babak Jabbari | 1 | 0 | 0+0 | 0 | 0+0 | 0 | 1+0 | 0 |
| 20 | MF | (Iran) IRI | Ahmad Jamshidian | 14 | 0 | 5+4 | 0 | 0+0 | 0 | 3+2 | 0 |
| 22 | MF | (Iran) IRI | Alireza Vahedi Nikbakht | 18 | 0 | 8+6 | 0 | 1+1 | 0 | 2+0 | 0 |
| 27 | MF | (Brazil) BRA | Antônio de Moura Carvalho | 14 | 0 | 5+4 | 0 | 0+2 | 0 | 0+3 | 0 |
| 34 | MF | (Iran) IRI | Iman Basafa | 9 | 0 | 3+3 | 0 | 1+1 | 0 | 1+0 | 0 |
Strikers
| 9 | FW | (Iran) IRI | Arash Borhani | 31 | 6 | 16+6 | 5 | 1+2 | 0 | 4+2 | 1 |
| 10 | FW | (Iran) IRI | Siavash Akbarpour | 32 | 2 | 17+7 | 2 | 3+1 | 0 | 4+0 | 0 |
| 11 | FW | (Iran) IRI | Mohammad Ghazi | 38 | 11 | 24+1 | 7 | 3+0 | 0 | 9+1 | 4 |
| 32 | FW | (Iran) IRI | Mehdi Nazari | 33 | 1 | 18+7 | 1 | 0+2 | 0 | 2+4 | 0 |
| 77 | FW | (Iran) IRI | Mehrdad Oladi | 25 | 3 | 9+10 | 2 | 2+2 | 1 | 2+0 | 0 |
| 19 | FW | (Burkina Faso) BFA | Boubacar Kébé | 15 | 3 | 5+6 | 1 | 1+0 | 0 | 2+1 | 2 |
Players sold or loaned out or retired after the start of the season:
| 6 | MF | (Iran) IRI | Javad Nekounam | 22 | 3 | 18+0 | 3 | 1+0 | 0 | 3+0 | 0 |
| 7 | FW | (Iran) IRI | Farhad Majidi | 14 | 4 | 4+6 | 4 | 0+0 | 0 | 2+2 | 0 |
| 26 | DF | (Iran) IRI | Fardin Abedini | 10 | 0 | 6+2 | 0 | 0+0 | 0 | 0+2 | 0 |
| 28 | MF | (Iran) IRI | Mehran Ghasemi | 2 | 0 | 0+2 | 0 | 0+0 | 0 | 0+0 | 0 |
| 31 | MF | (Serbia) SRB | Goran Lovre | 3 | 0 | 1+1 | 0 | 0+0 | 0 | 0+1 | 0 |
| 33 | DF | (Iran) IRI | Pejman Montazeri | 24 | 1 | 19+0 | 1 | 1+0 | 0 | 4+0 | 0 |

Last updated: 17 June 2014.
Source: Competitive matches

=== Disciplinary record ===
Includes all competitive matches. Players with 1 card or more included only.

Last updated on 06 December 2013

| No. | Nat. | Position | Name | Iran Pro League | | | AFC Champions League | | | Hazfi Cup | | | Total | | |
| No. | Nat. | Position | Name | Yellow card | (yellow card) (yellow-red card) | Red card | Yellow card | (yellow card) (yellow-red card) | Red card | Yellow card | (yellow card) (yellow-red card) | Red card | Yellow card | (yellow card) (yellow-red card) | Red card |
|---|---|---|---|---|---|---|---|---|---|---|---|---|---|---|---|
| 1 | (Iran) | GK | Mehdi Rahmati | 0 | 0 | 0 | 0 | 0 | 0 | 0 | 0 | 0 | 0 | 0 | 0 |
| 2 | (Iran) | DF | Khosro Heydari | 0 | 0 | 0 | 1 | 0 | 0 | 0 | 0 | 0 | 1 | 0 | 0 |
| 3 | (Trinidad and Tobago) | DF | Jlloyd Samuel | 3 | 0 | 1 | 0 | 0 | 0 | 0 | 0 | 0 | 3 | 0 | 1 |
| 4 | (Iran) | DF | Amir Hossein Sadeghi | 5 | 0 | 0 | 0 | 0 | 0 | 1 | 0 | 0 | 6 | 0 | 0 |
| 5 | (Iran) | DF | Hanif Omranzadeh | 4 | 0 | 0 | 1 | 0 | 0 | 0 | 0 | 0 | 5 | 0 | 0 |
| 6 | (Iran) | MF | Javad Nekounam | 6 | 0 | 0 | 2 | 0 | 0 | 0 | 0 | 0 | 8 | 0 | 0 |
| 8 | (Iran) | MF | Pejman Nouri | 3 | 0 | 0 | 0 | 0 | 0 | 0 | 0 | 0 | 3 | 0 | 0 |
| 9 | (Iran) | FW | Arash Borhani | 0 | 0 | 0 | 0 | 0 | 0 | 0 | 0 | 0 | 0 | 0 | 0 |
| 10 | (Iran) | FW | Siavash Akbarpour | 5 | 0 | 0 | 0 | 0 | 0 | 0 | 0 | 0 | 5 | 0 | 0 |
| 11 | (Iran) | FW | Mohammad Ghazi | 7 | 0 | 0 | 0 | 0 | 0 | 1 | 0 | 0 | 8 | 0 | 0 |
| 14 | (Iran) | MF | Andranik Teymourian | 6 | 0 | 0 | 2 | 0 | 0 | 1 | 0 | 0 | 9 | 0 | 0 |
| 11 | (Iran) | DF | Hashem Beikzadeh | 4 | 0 | 0 | 0 | 0 | 0 | 0 | 0 | 0 | 4 | 0 | 0 |
| 32 | (Iran) | FW | Mehdi Nazari | 4 | 0 | 0 | 0 | 0 | 0 | 0 | 0 | 0 | 4 | 0 | 0 |
| 70 | (Iran) | DF | Majid Gholamnejad | 3 | 0 | 0 | 0 | 0 | 0 | 1 | 0 | 0 | 4 | 0 | 0 |
| TOTALS | | | | 46 | 0 | 1 | 7 | 0 | 0 | 3 | 0 | 0 | 56 | 0 | 1 |

=== Goals conceded ===
- 05 Dec 2013

| Position | Nation | Number | Name | Pro League | Champions League | Hazfi Cup | Total | Minutes per goal |
|---|---|---|---|---|---|---|---|---|
| GK | (Iran) | 1 | Mehdi Rahmati | 21 | 5 | 2 | 28 | 109.3 min |
| TOTALS | | | | 21 | 5 | 2 | 28 | 109.3 min |

=== Overall statistics ===
| | Total | Home | Away | Neutral |
|---|---|---|---|---|
| Games played | 31 | 16 | 17 | N/A |
| Games won | 18 | 10 | 8 | N/A |
| Games drawn | 10 | 5 | 5 | N/A |
| Games lost | 5 | 1 | 4 | N/A |
| Biggest win | 4-2Fajr Sepasi F.C. | N/A | N/A | N/A |
| Biggest loss | 4-2Malavan F.C. | N/A | N/A | N/A |
| Biggest win (League) | N/A | N/A | N/A | N/A |
| Biggest win (Cup) | N/A | N/A | N/A | N/A |
| Biggest win (Asia) | N/A | N/A | N/A | N/A |
| Biggest loss (League) | N/A | N/A | N/A | N/A |
| Biggest loss (Cup) | N/A | N/A | N/A | N/A |
| Biggest loss (Asia) | N/A | N/A | N/A | N/A |
| Clean sheets | 14 | 9 | 5 | N/A |
| Goals scored | 37 | 19 | 18 | N/A |
| Goals conceded | 22 | 7 | 15 | N/A |
| Goal difference | +18 | +12 | +3 | N/A |
| Average GF per game | N/A | N/A | N/A | N/A |
| Average GA per game | N/A | N/A | N/A | N/A |
| Points | N/A | N/A | N/A | N/A |
| Winning rate | N/A | N/A | N/A | N/A |
| Most appearances | 28: Mehdi Rahmati | N/A | | |
| Most minutes played | 2520 min | N/A | | |
| Top scorer | Mohammad Ghazi | N/A | | |
| Top assister | N/A | N/A | | |

Last updated: 17 June 2013
Source: Competitive matches

== Awards ==
=== Player ===
| No. | Player | Award | Month | Source |
|---|---|---|---|---|
| 14 | (Iran) Andranik Teymourian | Persian Gulf Pro League Player of the year | June | |
| 14 | (Iran) Andranik Teymourian | Persian Gulf Pro League Midfielder of the year | June | |

== See also ==
- 2013–14 Iran Pro League
- 2013–14 Hazfi Cup
- 2013 AFC Champions League
- 2014 AFC Champions League
