= Ahmad Nematollahi =

Iranian football defender (born 1993)

Personal information
- Date of birth: 11 November 1993 (age 32)
- Place of birth: Qom, Iran
- Height: 1.96 m (6 ft 5 in)
- Position: Centre-back

Team information
- Current team: Record Club
- Number: 10

Youth career
- 2009–2011: Steel Azin
- 2011–2012: Esteghlal Tehran

Senior career*
Years	Team	Apps	(Gls)
2012–2015	Esteghlal Tehran	18	(3)
2016–2017	Baani gostare kish	10	(4)
2017–2018	Damash Tehran	12	(6)
2018–2019	Saba Qom	15	(5)
2020–	Record Club	22	(15)
- * Club domestic league appearances and goals

Ahmad Nematollahi (Persian: احمد نعمت‌الهی; born 11 November 1993 in Qom, Iran) is an Iranian footballer who plays as a centre-back.

== Honours ==
Esteghlal

- Iranian Football League: 2012–13

== Facebook ==
- Ahmad Nematollahi on Facebook

== Instagram ==
- Ahmad Nematollahi on Instagram

== Club career statistics ==
As of February 2015

Club performance			League		Cup		Continental		Total	
Season	Club	League	Apps	Goals	Apps	Goals	Apps	Goals	Apps	Goals
Iran			League		Hazfi Cup		Asia		Total	
2013–14	Esteghlal	Iran Pro League	0	0	0	0	1	0	1	0
Career total			0	0	0	0	1	0	1	0
