= Hamed Khosravi =

Iranian football midfielder (born 1992)

Personal information
- Full name: Hamed Khosravi
- Date of birth: August 25, 1992 (age 34)
- Place of birth: Tabriz, Iran
- Height: 1.70 m (5 ft 7 in)
- Position: Right midfielder

Youth career
- Esteghlal
- Persepolis

Senior career*
Years	Team	Apps	(Gls)
2010–2012	Steel Azin	28	(2)
2012–2013	Shahrdari Tabriz	2	(0)
2013–	Esteghlal	0	(0)
2013–	Esteghlal II	1	(0)
- * Club domestic league appearances and goals as of 5 September 2013

Hamed Khosravi (Persian: حامد خسروی, born August 25, 1992 in Tabriz, Iran) is a retired Iranian football midfielder, who currently plays for Esteghlal in Iran's Premier Football League.

== Club career ==
=== Club career statistics ===
As of 10 May 2013

Club performance			League		Cup		Continental		Total	
Season	Club	League	Apps	Goals	Apps	Goals	Apps	Goals	Apps	Goals
Iran			League		Hazfi Cup		Asia		Total	
2010–11	Steel Azin	Iran Pro League	14	0		0	–	–		0
2011–12	Steel Azin	Azadegan League	14	2		0	–	–		2
2012–13	Shahrdari Tabriz	Azadegan League	2	0	0	0	–	–	2	0
2013–14	Esteghlal	Iran Pro League	0	0	0	0	0	0	0	0
Total	Iran		30	2		0	0	0		2
Total	Career total		30	2		0	0	0		2

- Assist Goals

Season	Team	Assists
13–14	Esteghlal	0
