= Nathan Ribeiro =

Brazilian footballer

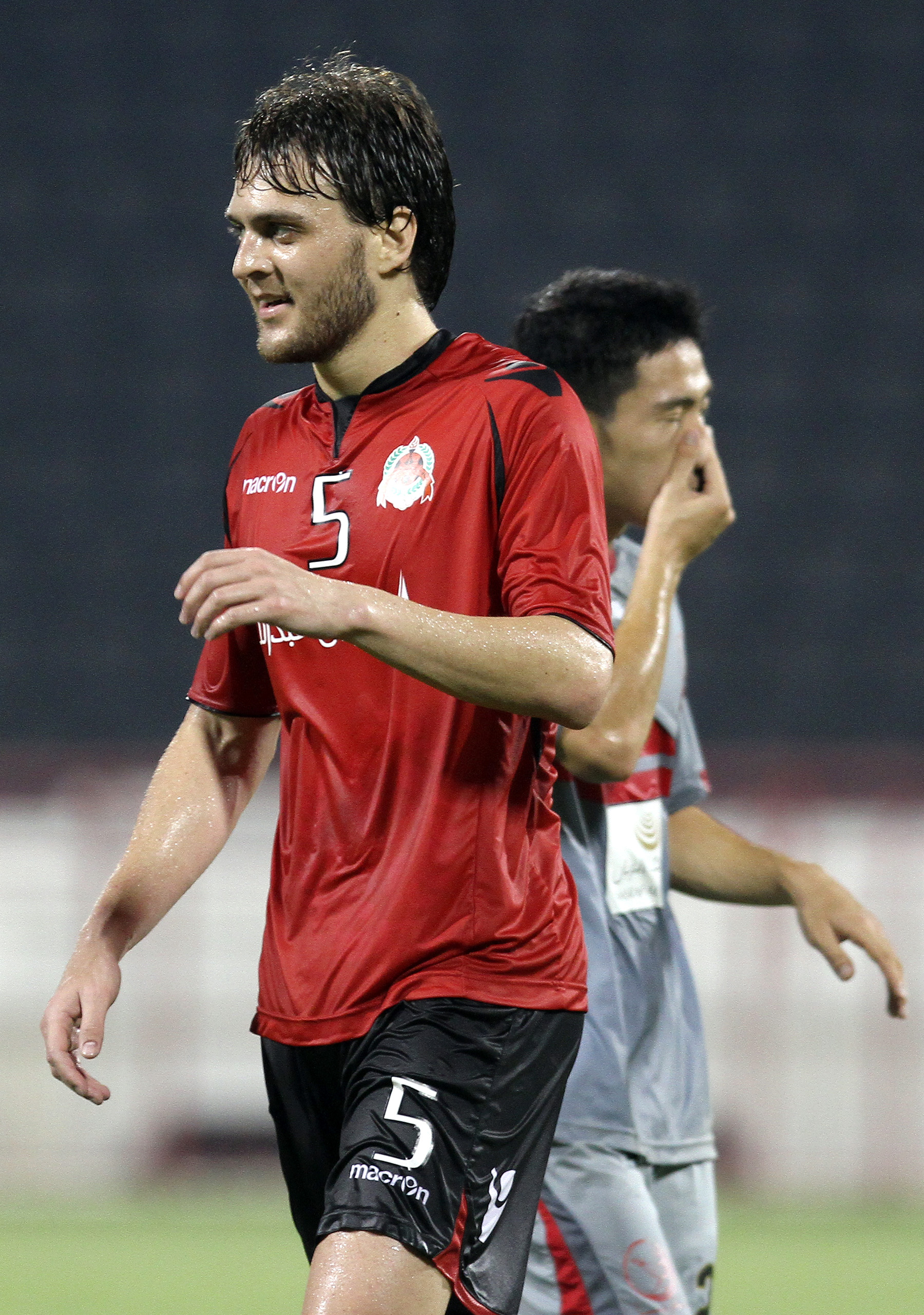

Personal information
- Full name: Nathan Otávio Ribeiro
- Date of birth: June 2, 1990 (age 36)
- Place of birth: Toledo, Brazil
- Height: 1.87 m (6 ft 1 1/2 in)
- Position: Centre back

Senior career*
Years	Team	Apps	(Gls)
2010–2018	Al Rayyan	96	(11)
2018–2021	Fluminense	9	(0)
2018	→ Kashiwa Reysol (loan)	6	(0)
2019	→ Fortaleza (loan)	5	(0)
2019–2021	→ Cortiba (loan)	14	(0)
2021	Cortiba	9	(0)
- * Club domestic league appearances and goals as of 16:07, 6 February 2022 (UTC)

Nathan Otávio Ribeiro (born 2 June 1990), known as Nathan Ribeiro or simply Nathan, is a Brazilian footballer who plays as a central defender. He was born in Toledo, Brazil but became a naturalized Qatari in October 2013, after living in the country for 5 years, for the sake of not counting towards his club's foreign player quota.
