= Mohammad Reza Soleimani =

Iranian footballer

Mohammad Reza Soleimani Asl
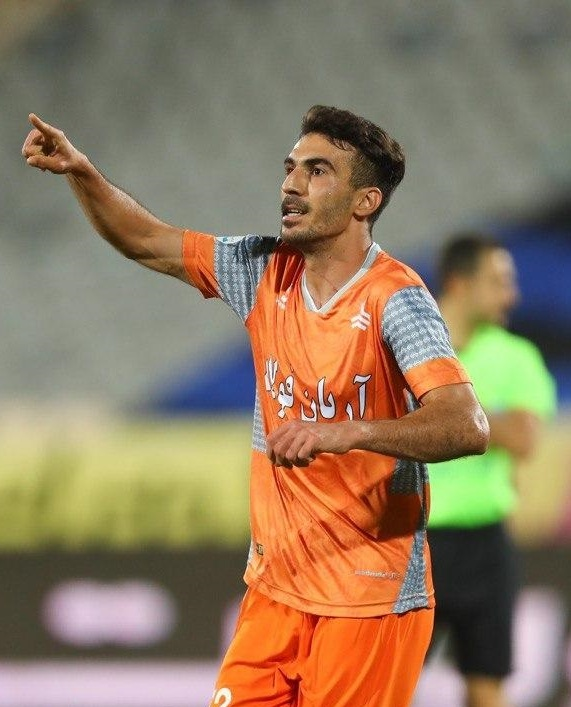
- Soleimani in 2020

Personal information
- Full name: Mohammad Reza Soleimani Asl
- Date of birth: 3 August 1995 (age 31)
- Place of birth: Hamadan, Iran
- Height: 1.85 m (6 ft 1 in)
- Position: Center forward

Team information
- Current team: Duhok
- Number: 20

Youth career
- 2011–2013: PAS Hamedan
- 2013–2014: Esteghlal

Senior career*
Years	Team	Apps	(Gls)
2012–2013	PAS Hamedan	4	(0)
2013–2015	Esteghlal	0	(0)
2015–2017	Rah Ahan	24	(4)
2017–2021	Saipa	86	(11)
2021–2022	Mes Rafsanjan	32	(5)
2022–2024	Zob Ahan	24	(4)
2023–2024	→ Malavan (loan)	22	(8)
2024–2026	Foolad	39	(10)
2026–	Duhok	5	(0)

International career^{‡}
2013	Iran U19	6	(2)
- * Club domestic league appearances and goals as of 18 April 2025 ‡ National team caps and goals as of 12 March 2016

Mohammad Reza Soleimani (Persian: محمدرضا سلیمانی; born 3 August 1995) is an Iranian football forward who plays for Duhok in the Iraqi Stars League.

Soleimani started playing football when he was 7 years old. He played for toddlers' and youth teams in matches between states.

He has played for PAS Hamedan F.C., Esteghlal F.C. and the Iran U19 national team. His good performance in Esteghlal F.C. U20 with 20 goals, led to his transfer to Rah Ahan, where he also performed well in the U20 team with 25 goals and 7 assists in seven matches.

== Rah Ahan ==
When Rah Ahan F.C. was in Premier League, he scored 4 goals and 11 assists.

== Saipa F.C. ==
In the first days of 2017 he contracted with Saipa F.C. He has scored 6 goals for Saipa in two seasons.
