= Amir Hossein Tahuni =

Iranian footballer (born 1992)

Personal information
- Full name: Amir Hossein Tahuni
- Date of birth: 22 October 1992 (age 34)
- Place of birth: Iran
- Position: Midfielder

Team information
- Current team: Shahrdari Mahshahr

Youth career
- 2004–2010: Persepolis
- 2010–2012: Rah Ahan Novin
- 2012–2013: Naft Tehran

Senior career*
Years	Team	Apps	(Gls)
2013–2014	Damash Iranian	0	(0)
2014–2015	Esteghlal	5	(0)
2015	→ Nassaji (loan)	8	(2)
2015–2016	Nassaji	8	(0)
2016–2018	Rah Ahan	5	(1)
2018–2019	Mes Kerman		
2019–	Shahrdari Mahshahr		
- * Club domestic league appearances and goals

Amir Hossein Tahuni (Persian: امیرحسین طاحونی, born 22 October 1992 in Iran) is an Iranian football midfielder, who currently plays for Shahrdari Mahshahr in League 2.

== Club career ==
=== Club Career Statistics ===
- Last Update: 23 April 2015

Club performance			League		Cup		Continental		Total	
Season	Club	League	Apps	Goals	Apps	Goals	Apps	Goals	Apps	Goals
Iran			League		Hazfi Cup		Asia		Total	
2014	Esteghlal	Iran Pro League	5	0	1	0	–	–	6	0
2015	→ Nassaji Mazandaran	Azadegan League	8	2	0	0	–	–	8	2
2016	Nassaji Mazandaran	Azadegan League	8	0	0	0	–	–	8	0
Career total			21	2	1	0	0	0	22	2
