= Record Club Az =

Record Club رکورد کلوب
- Full name: Record Club Az
- Ground: Olympia Idman Complex
- Capacity: 2,000; 3,500
- Owner: Reza Ebrahimi
- Chairman: Reza Ebrahimi
- League: to be determined
- Website: http://en.recordclubaz.com
Home colours	Away colours	Third colours

Active sports Record Club az
Football	Basketball	Handball
Volleyball	Futsal	Athletics

Sport Record Club (Azerbaijani: Rekord klubaz), commonly known as Record Club, also spelled Record Club, is an Azerbaijani football club based in Baku, Azerbaijan, that competes in the Azerbaijan Premier League. The club was founded in 2018 as Record Club Azarbayjan Football Club (Persian: باشگاه فوتبال رکورد کلوب آذربایجان).

Record Club Football Club was established on December 1, 2019, in Baku.

== Players ==
Note: Flags indicate national team as defined under FIFA eligibility rules; some limited exceptions apply. Players may hold more than one non-FIFA nationality.

No.	Pos.	Nation	Player
1	GK	(Iran) IRN	Mehdi Karimi

== Building and facilities ==
sports Complex

The club record club has a complete set of equipped football stadiums, training fields and a modern futsal hall. In addition to this hardware, the complex also has a swimming pool, weight room and gym.

These facilities have provided the club with the capacity to host various sporting events at different levels.

residential complex

By equipping and preparing its accommodation complex next to the sports complex, the Record Club has provided suitable conditions for setting up sports camps for different teams. Record accommodation complex has full services and is at a standard level
