= Rafael (footballer, born 1984) =

Brazilian footballer

Personal information
- Full name: Alberto Rafael da Silva
- Date of birth: March 24, 1984 (age 42)
- Place of birth: Araraquara, Brazil
- Height: 1.92 m (6 ft 4 in)
- Position: Goalkeeper

Team information
- Current team: Itumbiara

Senior career*
Years	Team	Apps	(Gls)
2006	São Bento		
2007	Bragantino		
2007	Inter de Limeira		
2008	Itumbiara		
2008–2009	Vasco da Gama		
2009–2013	Fluminense		
2012	→ Atlético Goianiense (loan)		
2012	→ Botafogo-SP (loan)		
2012	→ Ipatinga (loan)		
2012–2013	→ Grêmio Barueri (loan)		
2013	Rio Verde		
2014	Bangu		
2014	Esteghlal		
2015	Cabofriense		
2015	Macaé		
2015	CSA		
2016	Sampaio Corrêa		
2017–2019	Boavista		
2018	→ America (loan)		
2019	Gonçalense		
2019–2021	Uberlândia		
2021	Itumbiara		
2021–2022	Sampaio-RJ		
2022	Desportiva-ES		
2022–	Itumbiara		
- * Club domestic league appearances and goals

Alberto Rafael da Silva (born March 24, 1984), or simply Rafael, is a Brazilian goalkeeper.

== Club career ==
In 2008 Alberto signed a contract with Vasco da Gama. After 11 appearances and one year with the club, Alberto went on to sign with Fluminense. Between 2009 and 2011, Alberto became Fluminense's number one goalkeeper making 66 appearances in the time frame. In 2012, he signed a loan contract with Atlético Goianiense.

On 7 July 2014, da Silva left Fluminense and signed a two-year contract with Esteghlal.

== Honours ==
Itumbiara

- Campeonato Goiano: 2008

Fluminense

- Campeonato Brasileiro Série A: 2010

Atlético Goianiense

- Campeonato Goiano: 2011

Boavista

- Copa Rio: 2017

America

- Campeonato Carioca Série B1: 2018
