= Mohammad Khalili =

Iranian footballer

Personal information
- Date of birth: 1 October 1993 (age 33)
- Place of birth: Tehran, Iran
- Height: 1.75 m (5 ft 9 in)
- Position: Defender

Team information
- Current team: Shahin Bandar Ameri

Youth career
- 2010–2012: Esteghlal
- 2012–2014: Oghab Tehran

Senior career*
Years	Team	Apps	(Gls)
2014–2015	Esteghlal	0	(0)
2015–2017	Khoneh Be Khoneh	20	(1)
2017–2018	Mes Kerman	19	(0)
2018–2019	Aluminium Arak	4	(0)
2019–2020	Khooshe Talaee	3	(0)
2020–2021	Sanat Naft	2	(0)
2021–2022	Khooshe Talaee	2	(1)
2002–2023	Sorkhpooshan Novin Pakdasht		
2023	Nika Pars Chaloos		
2023–2024	Setaregan Javan		
2024–	Shahin Bandar Ameri		
- * Club domestic league appearances and goals as of 19 July 2021

Mohammad Khalili (Persian: محمد خلیلی; born 1 October 1993) is an Iranian footballer who plays for Shahin Bandar Ameri in the League 2.
