= Taha Zareei =

Iranian footballer

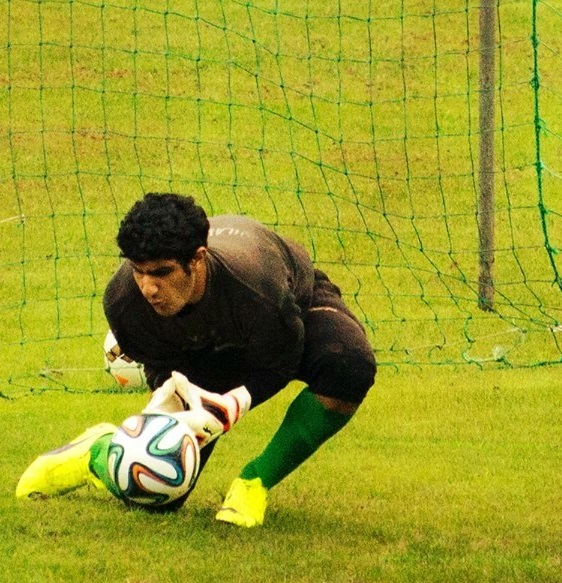

Personal information
- Date of birth: 20 November 1995 (age 30)
- Place of birth: Tehran, Iran
- Height: 1.88 m (6 ft 2 in)
- Position: Goalkeeper

Team information
- Current team: Vianense
- Number: 90

Youth career
- 2005–2009: Shahin
- 2009–2011: Saipa

Senior career*
Years	Team	Apps	(Gls)
2011–2014	Esteghlal	0	(0)
2014–2015	Naval	1	(0)
2015–2016	Leixões	4	(0)
2016–2017	CD Gouveia	5	(0)
2017–2018	Leça	16	(0)
2018–2019	Vila FC	34	(0)
2019–	Vianense	5	(0)
- * Club domestic league appearances and goals as of 23:06, 13 November 2019 (UTC)

Taha Zareei (Persian: طاها زارعی; born 20 November 1995) is an Iranian professional footballer who plays as a goalkeeper for Portuguese club SC Vianense.

== Career ==
On 3 July 2015, Zareei signed a two-year contract with Leixões S.C. in the Portuguese LigaPro. Zareei made his professional debut in Portugal for Leixões in a league match against FC Porto B on 26 August 2015. Leixões won 2–0 and Zareei was awarded man of the match. Taha made his second start of the season on 30 April 2016 in a 0–0 draw against Famalicão. In the 2015–16 season, Zareei made four appearances in all competitions, keeping two clean sheets and conceding six goals.

== Career statistics ==
As of match played 16 May 2016.

Appearances and goals by club, season and competition
Club	Season	League			Portuguese Cup		Europe		Total	
Club	Season	Division	Apps	Goals	Apps	Goals	Apps	Goals	Apps	Goals
Leixões	2015–16	LigaPro	2	0	2	0	0	0	4	0
Career total			2	0	2	0	0	0	4	0
