= Farzin Garousian =

Iranian footballer

Farzin Garoosian
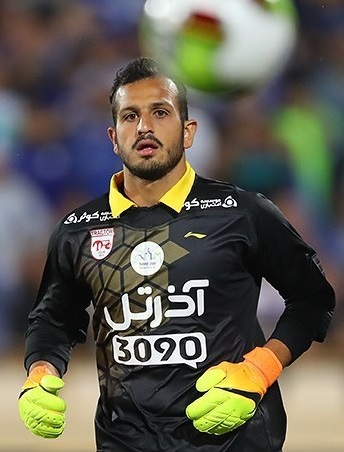
- Garousian with Tractor in 2017

Personal information
- Date of birth: 19 July 1992 (age 34)
- Place of birth: Tonekabon, Mazandaran, Iran
- Height: 1.84 m (6 ft 1/2 in)
- Position: Goalkeeper

Team information
- Current team: Gol Gohar
- Number: 1

Youth career
- 2006–2011: Shamoushak Noshahr
- 2011–2012: Parseh
- 2012–2013: Esteghlal

Senior career*
Years	Team	Apps	(Gls)
2013–2014	Mes Kerman		
2014	Mes Soongoun		
2014–2015	Esteghlal	0	(0)
2015–2016	Aluminium Hormozgan	3	(0)
2016–2018	Tractor	19	(0)
2018–2020	Esteghlal Khuzestan	41	(0)
2020–2023	Sanat Naft Abadan	46	(0)
2023–2024	Esteghlal Khuzestan	15	(0)
2024–	Gol Gohar	33	(0)
- * Club domestic league appearances and goals as of 9 November 2024

Farzin Garousian (Persian: فرزین گروسیان; born 19 July 1992) is an Iranian footballer who plays for Gol Gohar Sirjan.

== Club career ==
He was released by Tractor in June 2018.

== Career statistics ==
=== Club ===
Club	Season	League			Cup		Continental		Total	
Club	Season	League	Apps	Goals	Apps	Goals	Apps	Goals	Apps	Goals
Aluminium Hormozgan	2015-16	Azadegan League	3	0	0	0	0	0	3	0
Tractor	2016-17	Persian Gulf Pro League	0	0	1	0	0	0	1	0
Tractor	2017-18	Persian Gulf Pro League	19	0	3	0	1	0	23	0
Tractor	Total		19	0	4	0	1	0	24	0
Esteghlal Khuzestan	2018-19	Persian Gulf Pro League	14	0	2	0	0	0	16	0
Esteghlal Khuzestan	2019-20	Azadegan League	22	0	0	0	0	0	22	0
Esteghlal Khuzestan	Total		36	0	2	0	0	0	38	0
Sanat	2020-21	Persian Gulf Pro League	10	0	2	0	0	0	12	0
Sanat	2021-22	Persian Gulf Pro League	16	0	1	0	0	0	17	0
Sanat	2022-23	Persian Gulf Pro League	20	0	0	0	0	0	20	0
Sanat	Total		46	0	3	0	0	0	49	0
Esteghlal Khuzestan	2023-24	Persian Gulf Pro League	15	0	0	0	0	0	15	0
Career Total			119	0	9	0	1	0	129	0
