= Babak Jabbari =

Iranian footballer

Personal information
- Date of birth: 22 September 1984 (age 42)
- Place of birth: Iran
- Positions: Forward; midfielder

Youth career
- 2011–2015: Esteghlal

Senior career*
Years	Team	Apps	(Gls)
2014–2015	Esteghlal	1	(0)
- * Club domestic league appearances and goals

Babak Jabbari (Persian: بابک جباری; born 22 September 1984) is an Iranian footballer who played as a forward for Esteghlal.
