= Mohammad Mehdi Nazari =

Iranian footballer

Mehdi Nazari
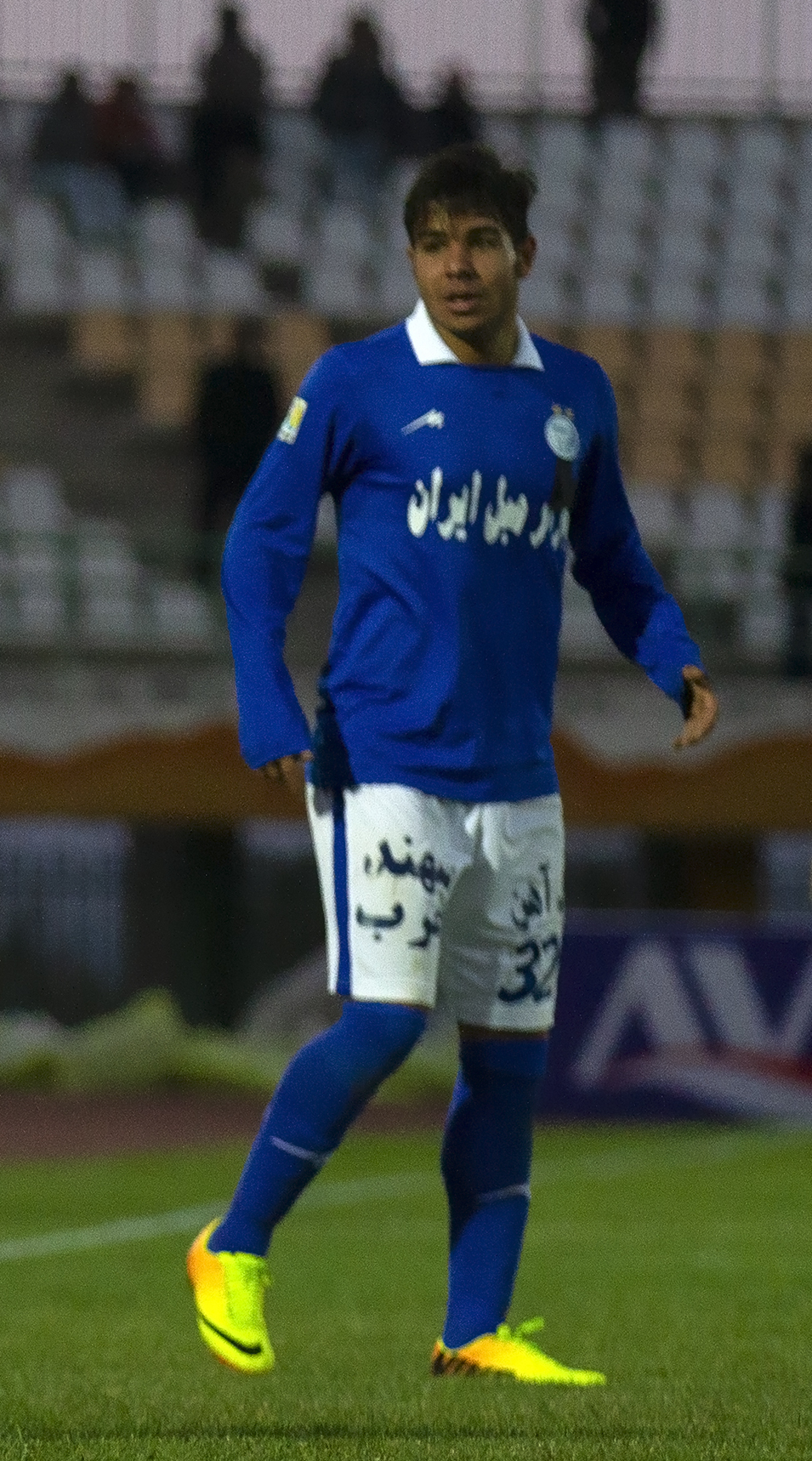

Personal information
- Full name: Mohammad Mehdi Nazari
- Date of birth: 1 March 1989 (age 37)
- Place of birth: Shiraz, Iran
- Height: 1.78 m (5 ft 10 in)
- Position: Forward

Team information
- Current team: Nassaji (assistant manager)

Youth career
- 1997–2007: Vali Asr Shiraz Academy
- 2007–2009: Mersad Shiraz

Senior career*
Years	Team	Apps	(Gls)
2009–2013	Fajr Sepasi	98	(21)
2013–2014	Esteghlal	24	(1)
2014	Gostaresh	7	(0)
2014–2015	Padideh	11	(1)
2015	Paykan	12	(4)
2017	Nassaji	3	(1)
2017–2018	Fajr Sepasi	24	(6)
2018–2023	Nassaji	75	(8)

International career
2012	Iran	2	(0)

Managerial career
- 2024–2025: Nassaji (assistant)
- 2025–: Nassaji (assistant)
- * Club domestic league appearances and goals

Mohammad Mehdi Nazari (Persian: محمدمهدی نظری; born 1 March 1989) is an Iranian football coach and a former player who is an assistant manager with Nassaji in the Persian Gulf Pro League.
