= Majid Gholamnejad =

Iranian footballer (1983–2018)

Personal information
- Full name: Majid Gholamnejad
- Date of birth: 18 June 1983
- Place of birth: Tehran, Iran
- Date of death: 14 September 2018 (aged 35)
- Place of death: Bandar Abbas, Iran
- Height: 5 ft 10 in (1.78 m)
- Positions: Midfielder; defender

Youth career
- Saipa

Senior career*
Years	Team	Apps	(Gls)
2004–2008	Saipa	46	(1)
2008–2010	Pas Hamedan	45	(4)
2010–2013	Saipa	48	(1)
2013–2014	Esteghlal	14	(0)
2016	Pas Hamedan	10	(0)
2016–2017	Shahin Bushehr		
2017–2018	Shahrdari Bandar Abbas		

International career^{‡}
2008–2010	Iran	17	(1)
- * Club domestic league appearances and goals as of 31 January 2014 ‡ National team caps and goals as of 12 October 2009

Majid Gholamnejad (Persian: مجید غلام‌نژاد, June 18, 1983 – September 14, 2018) was an Iranian football midfielder He was found dead on September 14, 2018, in a river in Siyahu after a heart attack.

== Club career ==
=== Club career statistics ===
As of 25 February 2014

Club performance			League		Cup		Continental		Total	
Season	Club	League	Apps	Goals	Apps	Goals	Apps	Goals	Apps	Goals
Iran			League		Hazfi Cup		Asia		Total	
2004–05	Saipa	Pro League	1	0			-	-		
2005–06	Saipa	Pro League	12	0			-	-		
2006–07	Saipa	Pro League	15	0			-	-		
2007–08	Saipa	Pro League	28	1			3	0		
2008–09	Pas	Pro League	25	1	2	0	-	-	27	1
2009–10	Pas	Pro League	20	3		0	-	-		3
2010–11	Saipa	Pro League	14	0			-	-		
2011–12	Saipa	Pro League	30	1	1	0	-	-	2	0
2012–13	Saipa	Pro League	14	0	0	0	-	-	14	0
2013–14	Saipa	Pro League	8	0	1	0	-	-	9	0
2013–14	Esteghlal	Pro League	14	0	3	0	2	0	19	0
Career total			156	6			4	0		

- Assist Goals

Season	Team	Assists
06–07	Saipa	1
07–08	Saipa	5
08–09	Pas	2
09–10	Pas	2
10–11	Saipa	0
13–14	Esteghlal	1

== International career ==
Gholamnejad was called up to the Iran national football team ahead of a FIFA World Cup qualifier against Kuwait. Gholamnejad debuted for the national team coming on as a 61st-minute substitute against Bahrain in a 1–0 defeat.

=== International goals ===
Scores and results list Iran's goal tally first.

#	Date	Venue	Opponent	Score	Result	Competition
1	14 January 2009	Azadi Stadium, Tehran	Singapore	1-0	6-0	2011 AFC Asian Cup qualification

== Honours ==
=== Club ===
- Iran's Premier Football League (1): 2006–07

=== National ===
- WAFF Championship (1): 2008
