= Tony (footballer, born 1986) =

Brazilian footballer

Personal information
- Full name: Antônio de Moura Carvalho
- Date of birth: 29 May 1986 (age 40)
- Place of birth: São Paulo, Brazil
- Height: 1.76 m (5 ft 9 1/2 in)
- Position: Attacking midfielder

Senior career*
Years	Team	Apps	(Gls)
2007	Ituano		
2009–2013	Boavista	70	(16)
2009	→ Botafogo (loan)	9	(1)
2009	→ Duque de Caxias (loan)	19	(4)
2010	→ Ceará (loan)	15	(0)
2011	→ Duque de Caxias (loan)	28	(2)
2012	→ Ponte Preta (loan)	6	(0)
2013	ABC	12	(1)
2014	Esteghlal	8	(0)
2015	XV de Piracicaba	14	(0)
2015–2017	América Mineiro	64	(3)
2017	CRB	26	(2)
2018	Ituano	11	(0)
2018	→ Juventude (loan)	27	(1)
2019–2022	Ferroviária	53	(5)
2019	→ Figueirense (loan)	31	(1)
2021	→ Guarani (loan)	19	(0)
2022	Criciúma	1	(0)
Total		413	(36)
- * Club domestic league appearances and goals

Antônio de Moura Carvalho (born 29 May 1986), commonly known as Tony, is a Brazilian footballer.

== Career ==
Tony began to be seen in senior football from the fine performances with the shirt Ituano, and thus arrive at Botafogo but not before going into some clubs. Botafogo after he went to the town that lent two consecutive years to reach the Ceará, which has a contract until the middle of 2011.

== Career statistics ==
As of match played 27 August 2022

Appearances and goals by club, season and competition
Club	Season	League			State League		Cup		Continental		Other		Total	
Club	Season	Division	Apps	Goals	Apps	Goals	Apps	Goals	Apps	Goals	Apps	Goals	Apps	Goals
Boavista	2009	Carioca	—		13	4	—		—		—		13	4
Boavista	2010	Carioca	—		14	3	—		—		—		14	3
Boavista	2011	Carioca	—		16	4	—		—		—		16	4
Boavista	2012	Carioca	—		14	1	—		—		—		14	1
Boavista	2013	Carioca	—		13	4	—		—		—		13	4
Boavista	Total		—		70	16	—		—		—		70	16
Botafogo (loan)	2009	Série A	9	1	—		—		—		—		9	1
Duque de Caxias (loan)	2009	Série B	19	4	—		—		—		—		19	4
Ceará (loan)	2010	Série A	15	0	—		—		—		1	0	16	0
Duque de Caxias (loan)	2011	Série B	28	2	—		—		—		—		28	2
Ponte Preta (loan)	2012	Série A	6	0	—		—		—		—		6	0
ABC	2013	Série B	12	1	—		2	0	—		—		14	1
Esteghlal	2013–14	Iran Pro League	8	0	—		1	0	3	0	—		12	0
XV de Piracicaba	2015	Paulista	—		14	0	—		—		—		14	0
América Mineiro	2015	Série B	31	2	—		2	0	—		—		33	2
América Mineiro	2016	Série A	13	0	13	1	3	0	—		3	0	32	1
América Mineiro	2017	Série B	0	0	7	0	2	0	—		2	0	11	0
América Mineiro	Total		44	2	20	1	7	0	—		5	0	76	3
CRB	2017	Série B	26	2	—		—		—		0	0	26	2
Ituano	2018	Paulista	—		11	0	1	0	—		—		12	0
Juventude (loan)	2018	Série B	27	1	—		—		—		—		27	1
Ferroviária	2019	Série D	—		13	2	—		—		—		13	2
Ferroviária	2020	Série D	16	1	11	1	4	0	—		—		31	2
Ferroviária	2022	Série D	11	1	2	0	0	0	—		—		13	1
Ferroviária	Total		27	2	26	3	4	0	—		—		57	5
Figueirense (loan)	2019	Série B	31	1	—		—		—		—		31	1
Guarani (loan)	2021	Série B	11	0	8	0	—		—		—		19	0
Criciúma	2022	Série B	1	0	—		—		—		—		1	0
Career total			264	16	149	20	15	0	3	0	5	0	436	36
