= Iman Basafa =

Iranian footballer

Personal information
- Full name: Iman Basafa
- Date of birth: 3 January 1992 (age 34)
- Place of birth: Isfahan, Iran
- Height: 1.85 m (6 ft 1 in)
- Position: Defensive midfielder

Youth career
- 2009–2010: Shahrdari Bandar Abbas
- 2010–2011: Mes Sarcheshmeh
- 2011–2012: Steel Azin
- 2012–2013: Shahrdari Arak

Senior career*
Years	Team	Apps	(Gls)
2012–2013	Shahrdari Arak	1	(0)
2013–2015	Esteghlal	6	(0)
2014–2015	→ Esteghlal Khuzestan (loan)	15	(1)
2015–2017	Fajr Sepasi	57	(9)
2017–2018	Malavan	22	(2)
2018–2019	Aluminium Arak	23	(3)
2019–2020	Pars Jonoubi	21	(1)
2020–2021	Machine Sazi	20	(0)
2021–2022	Bengaluru	7	(1)

International career
2007–2009	Iran U17	12	(0)
2009–2011	Iran U20	6	(1)
2011–2014	Iran U23	5	(0)
- * Club domestic league appearances and goals as of 12:53, 11 February 2022 (UTC)

Iman Basafa (Persian: ایمان باصفا; born 3 January 1992), is an Iranian professional footballer who most recently played as a defensive midfielder. He represented Iran national team at various youth levels.

== Club career ==
Iman Basafa began his youth career at Shahrdari Bandar Abbas and signed his first professional contract for Aluminium Arak FC in July 2012. He signed for Esteghlal FC in 2013 and later joined Esteghlal Khuzestan in 2014. His next destination was Fajr Sepasi Shiraz in 2015 and after two years, Basafa signed for Malavan Bandar Anzali in 2017.

In 2018, he returned to Aluminium Arak for a second spell with the club. However, he moved to Pars Jonoubi Jam after a year. In September 2020, he joined Machine Sazi Tabriz and later moved to India and signed with Bengaluru FC in the Indian Super League.

Iman Basafa has played in both the first and second tier of the Iranian league system. He is well-versed with domestic football in Iran and possesses many qualities learned from his experience there. He has made 104 appearances in the Azadegan League (the second tier), recording 17 goals and one assist in the process. The 29-year-old has also played over 64 games in the Persian Gulf Pro League (first tier), managing two goals and two assists.

Furthermore, Basafa has one AFC Champions League appearance, which was with Esteghlal FC. The midfielder has recorded over 12,116 minutes of football across his career and is no way past his best. Basafa has made the most appearances for Fajr Sepasi Shiraz (57) and also scored the most goals for them (9) among all his clubs.

Last season's performance The defensive midfielder turned out for Machine Sazi Tabriz in the Persian Gulf Pro League. He made 20 appearances for the outfit, clocking 1601 minutes of football. He did not score any goals and provided one assist. The outfit finished bottom, in 16th place, managing only 14 points in 30 games. Basafa also featured in the Hazfi Cup, in a 3–0 defeat to Foolad FC in the fourth round.

After his move to India, Basafa made his Indian Super League debut for Bengaluru FC on 20 November 2021 against NorthEast United FC in a 4–2 win. On 24 November, he played the whole match against Odisha FC but they lost by 3–1. He scored his first league goal for Bengaluru on 26 January 2022 against Chennaiyin in their 3–0 win.

== Style of play ==
Iman Basafa is a defensive midfielder. He likes to sit deep and protect the backline.

== Career statistics ==
Club performance			League		Cup		Continental		Total	
Season	Club	League	Apps	Goals	Apps	Goals	Apps	Goals	Apps	Goals
Iran			League		Hazfi Cup		ACL		Total	
2013–14	Esteghlal	Pro League	6	0	2	0	1	0	9	0
2014–15	→ Est. Khuzestan	Pro League	10	1	0	0	–		10	1
2015–16	Fajr Sepasi	Azadegan League	9	2	0	0	–		9	2
2016–17	Fajr Sepasi	Azadegan League	26	7	0	0	–		26	7
2017–18	Malavan	Azadegan League	22	2	1	0	-	-	23	2
2018–19	Aluminium Arak	Azadegan League	25	6	0	0	-	-	25	6
2019–20	Pars Jonoubi	Pro League	23	1	1	0	-	-	24	1
2020–21	Machine Sazi	Pro League	20	0	1	0	-	-	21	0
2021–22	Bengaluru FC	Indian Super League	3	0	0	0	–		0	0
Career total	-	-	144	19	5	0	1	0	150	19
